= Ell Township, Hancock County, Iowa =

Ell Township
- Township
- Location in Hancock County
- Coordinates: 43°02′06″N 93°32′49″W
- Country: United States
- State: Iowa
- County: Hancock

Area
  - Total: 36.39 sq mi (94.25 km^{2})
  - Land: 36.39 sq mi (94.25 km^{2})
  - Water: 0 sq mi (0 km^{2}) 0%
- Elevation: 1,224 ft (373 m)

Population (2000)
  - Total: 870
  - Density: 24/sq mi (9.2/km^{2})
- Time zone: UTC-6 (CST)
  - Summer (DST): UTC-5 (CDT)
- ZIP codes: 50438, 50449
- GNIS feature ID: 0467783

Ell Township is one of sixteen townships in Hancock County, Iowa, USA. As of the 2000 census, its population was 870.

== History ==
Ell Township was organized in 1879. It was named for Sebastian Ell, a pioneer settler.

== Geography ==
According to the United States Census Bureau, Ell Township covers an area of 36.39 square miles (94.25 square kilometers).

=== Cities, towns, villages ===
- Garner (south edge)
- Klemme

=== Adjacent townships ===
- Concord Township (north)
- Clear Lake Township, Cerro Gordo County (northeast)
- Union Township, Cerro Gordo County (east)
- Grimes Township, Cerro Gordo County (southeast)
- Avery Township (south)
- Twin Lake Township (southwest)
- Liberty Township (west)
- Garfield Township (northwest)

=== Cemeteries ===
The township contains Calvary Cemetery.

== School districts ==
- Belmond–Klemme Community School District
- Garner–Hayfield Community School District
- Ventura Community School District

== Political districts ==
- Iowa's 4th congressional district
- State House District 11
- State House District 12
- State Senate District 6
