= Concord Township, Hancock County, Iowa =

Concord Township
- Township
- Location in Hancock County
- Coordinates: 43°07′41″N 93°32′50″W
- Country: United States
- State: Iowa
- County: Hancock

Area
  - Total: 35.83 sq mi (92.79 km^{2})
  - Land: 35.74 sq mi (92.57 km^{2})
  - Water: 0.085 sq mi (0.22 km^{2}) 0.24%
- Elevation: 1,220 ft (372 m)

Population (2000)
  - Total: 3,246
  - Density: 91/sq mi (35.1/km^{2})
- Time zone: UTC-6 (CST)
  - Summer (DST): UTC-5 (CDT)
- ZIP codes: 50438, 50482
- GNIS feature ID: 0467647

Concord Township is one of sixteen townships in Hancock County, Iowa, USA. At the 2000 census, its population was 3,246.

== History ==
Concord Township was founded in 1869.

== Geography ==
According to the United States Census Bureau, Concord Township covers an area of 35.83 square miles (92.79 square kilometers); of this, 35.74 square miles (92.57 square kilometers, 99.76 percent) is land and 0.08 square miles (0.22 square kilometers, 0.24 percent) is water.

=== Cities, towns, villages ===
- Garner (vast majority)

=== Unincorporated towns ===
- Hayfield Junction at 43.133848°N 93.599378°W

(This list is based on USGS data and may include former settlements.)

=== Adjacent townships ===
- Ellington Township (north)
- Grant Township, Cerro Gordo County (northeast)
- Clear Lake Township, Cerro Gordo County (east)
- Union Township, Cerro Gordo County (southeast)
- Ell Township (south)
- Liberty Township (southwest)
- Garfield Township (west)
- Madison Township (northwest)

=== Cemeteries ===
The township contains these two cemeteries: Concord and Saint Johns.

=== Major highways ===
- U.S. Route 18

=== Landmarks ===
- Concord Park

== School districts ==
- Garner–Hayfield Community School District
- Ventura Community School District

== Political districts ==
- Iowa's 4th congressional district
- State House District 11
- State Senate District 6
