= Ellington Township, Hancock County, Iowa =

Ellington Township
- Township
- Location in Hancock County
- Coordinates: 43°12′30″N 93°33′16″W
- Country: United States
- State: Iowa
- County: Hancock

Area
  - Total: 35.74 sq mi (92.57 km^{2})
  - Land: 35.68 sq mi (92.42 km^{2})
  - Water: 0.058 sq mi (0.15 km^{2}) 0.16%
- Elevation: 1,224 ft (373 m)

Population (2000)
  - Total: 550
  - Density: 16/sq mi (6/km^{2})
- Time zone: UTC-6 (CST)
  - Summer (DST): UTC-5 (CDT)
- ZIP codes: 50436, 50438, 50482
- GNIS feature ID: 0467784

Ellington Township is one of sixteen townships in Hancock County, Iowa, United States. As of the 2000 census, its population was 550.

== History ==
Ellington Township was organized in 1861.

== Geography ==
According to the United States Census Bureau, Ellington Township covers an area of 35.74 square miles (92.57 square kilometers); of this, 35.68 square miles (92.42 square kilometers, 99.84 percent) is land and 0.06 square miles (0.15 square kilometers, 0.16 percent) is water.

=== Cities, towns, villages ===
- Forest City (east edge)

=== Unincorporated towns ===
- Miller at 43.184125°N 93.600212°W

(This list is based on USGS data and may include former settlements.)

=== Adjacent townships ===
- Mount Valley Township, Winnebago County (north)
- Fertile Township, Worth County (northeast)
- Grant Township, Cerro Gordo County (east)
- Clear Lake Township, Cerro Gordo County (southeast)
- Concord Township (south)
- Garfield Township (southwest)
- Madison Township (west)
- Forest Township, Winnebago County (northwest)

=== Cemeteries ===
The township contains these three cemeteries: Ellington, Ellington Prairie and Pilot Knob Lutheran.

=== Lakes ===
- Deadman's Lake
- Pilot Knob Lake

=== Landmarks ===
- Pilot Knob State Park

== School districts ==
- Forest City Community School District
- Garner–Hayfield–Ventura Community School District

== Political districts ==
- Iowa's 4th congressional district
- State House District 11
- State Senate District 6
