= Garfield Township, Hancock County, Iowa =

Garfield Township
- Township
- Location in Hancock County
- Coordinates: 43°07′37″N 93°40′00″W
- Country: United States
- State: Iowa
- County: Hancock

Area
  - Total: 35.4 sq mi (91.8 km^{2})
  - Land: 35.0 sq mi (90.7 km^{2})
  - Water: 0.42 sq mi (1.1 km^{2}) 1.2%
- Elevation: 1,220 ft (372 m)

Population (2000)
  - Total: 421
  - Density: 12/sq mi (4.6/km^{2})
- Time zone: UTC-6 (CST)
  - Summer (DST): UTC-5 (CDT)
- ZIP codes: 50423, 50438
- GNIS feature ID: 0467892

Garfield Township is one of sixteen townships in Hancock County, Iowa, USA. As of the 2000 census, its population was 421.

== History ==
Garfield Township was organized in 1880. It was named for President James A. Garfield.

== Geography ==
According to the United States Census Bureau, Garfield Township covers an area of 35.44 square miles (91.8 square kilometers); of this, 35.02 square miles (90.7 square kilometers, 98.8 percent) is land and 0.42 square miles (1.1 square kilometers, 1.2 percent) is water.

=== Unincorporated towns ===
- Duncan at 43.104683°N 93.711327°W

(This list is based on USGS data and may include former settlements.)

=== Adjacent townships ===
- Madison Township (north)
- Ellington Township (northeast)
- Concord Township (east)
- Ell Township (southeast)
- Liberty Township (south)
- Erin Township (southwest)
- Britt Township (west)
- Crystal Township (northwest)

=== Cemeteries ===
The township contains these two cemeteries: Saint Boniface and Saint John.

=== Major highways ===
- U.S. Route 18
- U.S. Route 69

=== Airports and landing strips ===
- Garner Municipal Airport [defunct]

=== Lakes ===
- Eagle Lake

== School districts ==
- Garner–Hayfield–Ventura Community School District
- West Hancock Community School District

== Political districts ==
- Iowa's 4th congressional district
- State House District 11
- State Senate District 6
