= Vin Schleusner =

American football player (1908–1979)

Profile
- Position: Tackle

Personal information
- Born: March 3, 1908; Garner, Iowa, U.S.
- Died: June 5, 1979 (aged 71); Rock Rapids, Iowa, U.S.
- Listed height: 6 ft 3 in (1.91 m)
- Listed weight: 225 lb (102 kg)

Career information
- High school: Garner (IA)
- College: Iowa

Career history
- Portsmouth Spartans (1930–1931)

Awards and highlights
- Second-team All-Big Ten (1928)
- Stats at Pro Football Reference

Vincent Louis "Slice" Schleusner (March 3, 1908 – June 5, 1979) was an American football player. He played college football for Iowa and professional football for the Portsmouth Spartans in the National Football League (NFL).

== Early life ==
Schleusner was born in 1908 in Garner, Iowa. He attended Garner High School.

== University of Iowa ==
He attended the University of Iowa and played college football for the Iowa Hawkeyes from 1927 and 1928. He earned All-Big Ten honors as a junior in 1928 but was ruled ineligible due to scholastic reasons in 1929. He rejected an offer from the Chicago Bears in September 1929, hoping to have his eligibility restored.

== Portsmouth Spartans ==
In July 1930, Schleusner signed to play professional football for the Portsmouth Spartans of the NFL. He played tackle for the 1930 Spartans as a tackle for the Spartans during the 1930 and 1931 seasons, appearing in 14 NFL games, six as a starter. In July 1931, he signed to return to the Spartans. He appeared in 11 games in 1931 but missed part of the 1931 season when his eight-month-old son died from pneumonia in October 1931.

== Family and later years ==
Schleusner married Edith Bulichek in 1930. After retiring from football, he worked as a buyer for the Hormel Meat Company. He died in 1978 in Rock Rapids, Iowa.
