= Liberty Township, Hancock County, Iowa =

Liberty Township
- Township
- Location in Hancock County
- Coordinates: 43°02′12″N 93°40′38″W
- Country: United States
- State: Iowa
- County: O'Brien

Area
  - Total: 36.14 sq mi (93.61 km^{2})
  - Land: 36.09 sq mi (93.48 km^{2})
  - Water: 0.050 sq mi (0.13 km^{2}) 0.14%
- Elevation: 1,230 ft (375 m)

Population (2000)
  - Total: 276
  - Density: 7.8/sq mi (3/km^{2})
- Time zone: UTC-6 (CST)
  - Summer (DST): UTC-5 (CDT)
- ZIP codes: 50423, 50438, 50449
- GNIS feature ID: 0468218

Liberty Township is one of sixteen townships in Hancock County, Iowa, USA. As of the 2000 census, its population was 276.

== History ==
Liberty Township was originally called German Township, and under the latter name was organized in 1878. It was originally settled chiefly by Germans, hence its former name.

In the 20th century, German Township was renamed Liberty Township due to Anti-German sentiment during World War I.

== Geography ==
According to the United States Census Bureau, Liberty Township covers an area of 36.14 square miles (93.61 square kilometers); of this, 36.09 square miles (93.48 square kilometers, 99.86 percent) is land and 0.05 square miles (0.13 square kilometers, 0.14 percent) is water.

=== Adjacent townships ===
- Garfield Township (north)
- Concord Township (northeast)
- Ell Township (east)
- Avery Township (southeast)
- Twin Lake Township (south)
- Amsterdam Township (southwest)
- Erin Township (west)
- Britt Township (northwest)

=== Cemeteries ===
The township contains Liberty Cemetery.

=== Major highways ===
- U.S. Route 69

== School districts ==
- Belmond–Klemme Community School District
- Garner–Hayfield–Ventura Community School District
- West Hancock Community School District

== Political districts ==
- Iowa's 4th congressional district
- State House District 12
- State Senate District 6
