= National Register of Historic Places listings in Hancock County, Iowa =

Location of Hancock County in Iowa

This is intended to be a complete list of the properties and districts on the National Register of Historic Places in Hancock County, Iowa, United States. Latitude and longitude coordinates are provided for many National Register properties and districts; these locations may be seen together in a map.

There are 9 properties and districts listed on the National Register in the county, including one National Historic Landmark.

This National Park Service list is complete through NPS recent listings posted March 21, 2025.

	Name on the Register	Image	Date listed	Location	City or town	Description
1	The Avery Theater	The Avery Theater	November 12, 2008 (#08001043)	495 State St. 43°06′02″N 93°36′08″W	Garner	
2	Hancock County Courthouse	Hancock County Courthouse	July 2, 1981 (#81000240)	State St. 43°05′47″N 93°36′04″W	Garner	
3	Pilot Knob State Park, Observation Tower (Area 2)	Pilot Knob State Park, Observation Tower (Area 2)	November 15, 1990 (#90001686)	South of the junction of Iowa Highways 9 and 332; 43°15′09″N 93°33′09″W	Forest City	
4	Pilot Knob State Park, Picnic Shelter (Area 3)	Pilot Knob State Park, Picnic Shelter (Area 3)	November 15, 1990 (#90001687)	South of the junction of Iowa Highways 9 and 332; 43°14′54″N 93°34′01″W	Forest City	
5	Pilot Knob State Park, Amphitheater (Area 4)	Pilot Knob State Park, Amphitheater (Area 4)	November 15, 1990 (#90001688)	South of the junction of Iowa Highways 9 and 332; 43°15′12″N 93°32′39″W	Forest City	
6	Pilot Knob State Park, Portals (Area 5a)	Pilot Knob State Park, Portals (Area 5a)	November 15, 1990 (#90001689)	South of the junction of Iowa Highways 9 and 332; 43°15′18″N 93°34′02″W	Forest City	
7	Pilot Knob State Park: Portals in Area 5b	Pilot Knob State Park: Portals in Area 5b	April 17, 1995 (#95000362)	Off Iowa Highway 9 southeast of Forest City in Pilot Knob State Park; 43°15′20″N 93°32′46″W	Forest City	
8	Pilot Knob State Park, Trail Area (Area 6a-6c)	Pilot Knob State Park, Trail Area (Area 6a-6c)	November 15, 1990 (#90001690)	South of the junction of Iowa Highways 9 and 332; 43°14′55″N 93°33′26″W	Forest City	
9	George E. Stubbins House	George E. Stubbins House	April 15, 1999 (#99000453)	248 1st Ave., SW. 43°05′41″N 93°48′11″W	Britt	

== See also ==
- List of National Historic Landmarks in Iowa
- National Register of Historic Places listings in Iowa
- Listings in neighboring counties: Cerro Gordo, Kossuth, Winnebago, Wright
