= Avery Township, Hancock County, Iowa =

Avery Township
- Township
- Location in Hancock County
- Coordinates: 42°56′49″N 93°33′46″W
- Country: United States
- State: Iowa
- County: Hancock

Area
  - Total: 35.88 sq mi (92.94 km^{2})
  - Land: 35.84 sq mi (92.82 km^{2})
  - Water: 0.042 sq mi (0.11 km^{2}) 0.12%
- Elevation: 1,250 ft (380 m)

Population (2000)
  - Total: 387
  - Density: 11/sq mi (4.2/km^{2})
- Time zone: UTC-6 (CST)
  - Summer (DST): UTC-5 (CDT)
- ZIP codes: 50439, 50449, 50457
- GNIS feature ID: 0467404

Avery Township is one of sixteen townships in Hancock County, Iowa, United States. As of the 2000 census, its population was 387.

== History ==
Avery Township was named for Anson Avery, a pioneer settler.

== Geography ==
According to the United States Census Bureau, Avery Township covers an area of 35.88 square miles (92.94 square kilometers); of this, 35.84 square miles (92.82 square kilometers, 99.87 percent) is land and 0.04 square miles (0.11 square kilometers, 0.12 percent) is water.

=== Cities, towns, villages ===
- Goodell (east three-quarters)

=== Adjacent townships ===
- Ell Township (north)
- Union Township, Cerro Gordo County (northeast)
- Grimes Township, Cerro Gordo County (east)
- Wisner Township, Franklin County (southeast)
- Pleasant Township, Wright County (south)
- Belmond Township, Wright County (southwest)
- Twin Lake Township (west)
- Liberty Township (northwest)

=== Cemeteries ===
The township contains Amsterdam & Calvary Cemeteries.

=== Landmarks ===
- Eldred Sherwood Park

== School districts ==
- Belmond–Klemme Community School District
- Sheffield–Chapin–Meservey–Thornton Community School District

== Political districts ==
- Iowa's 4th congressional district
- State House District 12
- State Senate District 6
