= Avery Township =

Avery Township may refer to:

- Avery Township, Hancock County, Iowa
- Avery Township, Humboldt County, Iowa
- Avery Township, Michigan
