= 2000 United States presidential election in Iowa =

- November 7, 2000

Nominee	Al Gore	George W. Bush
Party	Democratic	Republican
Home state	Tennessee	Texas
Running mate	Joe Lieberman	Dick Cheney
Electoral vote	7	0
Popular vote	638,517	634,373
Percentage	48.54%	48.22%

Gore
40–50%
50–60%
Bush
40–50%
50–60%
60–70%
70–80%
80–90%
President before election
Bill Clinton
Democratic
Elected President
George W. Bush
Republican

The 2000 United States presidential election in Iowa took place on November 7, 2000, and was part of the 2000 United States presidential election. Voters chose seven representatives, or electors, to the Electoral College, who voted for president and vice president.

Iowa was won by Democratic Vice President Al Gore by a margin of 0.32% and 4,144 votes over Republican Texas Governor George W. Bush, with Green Party candidate Ralph Nader taking 2.23% of the vote.

Gore's win in Iowa marked the fourth consecutive victory for Democrats in Iowa, and the first time since 1988 that the state did not vote for the national winner, a feat which would not occur again until 2020. Gore remains the last Democratic nominee to win Iowa yet lose the presidential election.

Along with the 1988 election, this remains the second (and last) of only two times in history that a Republican was elected president without carrying Iowa as neither George W. Bush nor George H. W. Bush carried the state on their first run for the presidency. This is the only state that Gore won in 2000 that Joe Biden lost in his successful bid for the presidency in 2020.

Natural Law Party nominee John Hagelin had his strongest county-level showing in his home county of Jefferson County, Iowa, where he garnered 14.7% of the vote. However, he came in sixth statewide, and his vote total was less than the narrow margin separating Gore and Bush.

== General election ==
=== Polling ===
Poll source	Date(s)	Sample size	Margin of error	George W. Bush (R)	Al Gore (D)	Ralph Nader (G)	Other / undecided (Note: Calculated by taking the difference of 100% and all other listed candidates combined. For polls that do not report a figure for Nader, this includes his support.)
Harris Insights & Analytics	November 3, 2000	2,478	—	44%	50%	4%	2%
Rasmussen Reports	November 2, 2000	1,000	—	46%	42%	—	12%
Research 2000	November 1, 2000	603	—	43%	44%	4%	9%
Selzer & Co.	November 1, 2000	805	—	42%	44%	3%	11%
PSI	October 31, 2000	500	—	44%	41%	—	15%
SurveyUSA	October 30, 2000	500	—	46%	46%	—	8%

=== Results ===
2000 United States presidential election in Iowa
Party	Candidate	Votes	Percentage	Electoral votes
Democratic	Al Gore	638,517	48.54%	7
Republican	George W. Bush	634,373	48.22%	0
Green	Ralph Nader	29,374	2.23%	0
Reform	Pat Buchanan	5,731	0.44%	0
Libertarian	Harry Browne	3,209	0.24%	0
Nominated by Petition	John Hagelin	2,281	0.17%	0
Constitution	Howard Phillips	613	0.05%	0
Socialist Workers	James Harris	190	0.01%	0
Socialist Party USA	David McReynolds	107	<0.01%	0
Scattering		1,168	0.09%	—
Totals		1,315,563	100.00%	7
Voter turnout (voting age/registered)				60%/71%

==== By county ====
County	Al Gore Democratic		George W. Bush Republican		Various candidates Other parties		Margin		Total votes cast
County	#	%	#	%	#	%	#	%	Total votes cast
Adair	1,753	42.52%	2,275	55.18%	95	2.30%	-522	-12.66%	4,123
Adams	897	41.82%	1,170	54.55%	78	3.64%	-273	-12.73%	2,145
Allamakee	2,883	44.61%	3,277	50.71%	302	4.67%	-394	-6.10%	6,462
Appanoose	2,560	44.88%	2,992	52.45%	152	2.66%	-432	-7.57%	5,704
Audubon	1,780	47.04%	1,909	50.45%	95	2.51%	-129	-3.41%	3,784
Benton	5,915	50.27%	5,468	46.47%	383	3.26%	447	3.80%	11,766
Black Hawk	30,112	54.66%	23,468	42.60%	1,505	2.73%	6,644	12.06%	55,085
Boone	6,270	51.19%	5,625	45.92%	354	2.89%	645	5.27%	12,249
Bremer	5,169	46.26%	5,675	50.78%	331	2.96%	-506	-4.52%	11,175
Buchanan	5,045	53.61%	4,092	43.49%	273	2.90%	953	10.12%	9,410
Buena Vista	3,297	41.33%	4,354	54.58%	326	4.09%	-1,057	-13.25%	7,977
Butler	2,735	40.68%	3,837	57.06%	152	2.26%	-1,102	-16.38%	6,724
Calhoun	2,132	42.29%	2,776	55.07%	133	2.64%	-644	-12.78%	5,041
Carroll	4,463	46.65%	4,879	50.99%	226	2.36%	-416	-4.34%	9,568
Cass	2,481	36.06%	4,206	61.13%	193	2.81%	-1,725	-25.07%	6,880
Cedar	4,033	48.33%	4,031	48.31%	280	3.36%	2	0.02%	8,344
Cerro Gordo	12,185	54.98%	9,397	42.40%	580	2.62%	2,788	12.58%	22,162
Cherokee	2,845	43.16%	3,463	52.53%	284	4.31%	-618	-9.37%	6,592
Chickasaw	3,435	52.17%	2,936	44.59%	213	3.24%	499	7.58%	6,584
Clarke	2,081	49.83%	1,984	47.51%	111	2.66%	97	2.32%	4,176
Clay	3,294	43.47%	3,992	52.68%	292	3.85%	-698	-9.21%	7,578
Clayton	4,238	49.45%	4,034	47.07%	299	3.49%	204	2.38%	8,571
Clinton	12,276	55.35%	9,229	41.61%	675	3.04%	3,047	13.74%	22,180
Crawford	2,838	43.30%	3,482	53.12%	235	3.59%	-644	-9.82%	6,555
Dallas	8,561	44.29%	10,306	53.32%	463	2.40%	-1,745	-9.03%	19,330
Davis	1,691	45.00%	1,956	52.05%	111	2.95%	-265	-7.05%	3,758
Decatur	1,674	45.13%	1,903	51.31%	132	3.56%	-229	-6.18%	3,709
Delaware	3,808	45.61%	4,273	51.18%	268	3.21%	-465	-5.57%	8,349
Des Moines	11,351	58.62%	7,385	38.14%	629	3.25%	3,966	20.48%	19,365
Dickinson	3,660	45.07%	4,225	52.03%	236	2.91%	-565	-6.96%	8,121
Dubuque	22,341	55.41%	16,462	40.83%	1,520	3.77%	5,879	14.58%	40,323
Emmet	2,165	46.76%	2,331	50.35%	134	2.89%	-166	-3.59%	4,630
Fayette	4,640	48.23%	4,747	49.34%	234	2.43%	-107	-1.11%	9,621
Floyd	3,830	52.92%	3,191	44.09%	217	3.00%	639	8.83%	7,238
Franklin	2,122	42.97%	2,657	53.81%	159	3.22%	-535	-10.84%	4,938
Fremont	1,459	40.35%	2,069	57.22%	88	2.43%	-610	-16.87%	3,616
Greene	2,301	48.76%	2,282	48.36%	136	2.88%	19	0.40%	4,719
Grundy	2,139	35.00%	3,851	63.02%	121	1.98%	-1,712	-28.02%	6,111
Guthrie	2,493	45.58%	2,840	51.93%	136	2.49%	-347	-6.35%	4,123
Hamilton	3,407	44.98%	3,968	52.39%	199	2.63%	-561	-7.41%	7,574
Hancock	2,281	41.95%	2,988	54.95%	169	3.11%	-707	-13.00%	5,438
Hardin	3,734	44.27%	4,486	53.18%	215	2.55%	-752	-8.91%	8,435
Harrison	2,551	38.99%	3,802	58.11%	190	2.90%	-1,251	-19.12%	6,543
Henry	3,907	45.06%	4,476	51.62%	288	3.32%	-569	-6.56%	8,671
Howard	2,426	54.02%	1,922	42.80%	143	3.18%	504	11.22%	4,491
Humboldt	1,949	39.45%	2,846	57.61%	145	2.94%	-897	-18.16%	4,940
Ida	1,411	40.42%	1,968	56.37%	112	3.21%	-557	-15.95%	3,491
Iowa	3,230	43.57%	3,894	52.53%	289	3.90%	-664	-8.96%	7,413
Jackson	4,945	54.75%	3,769	41.73%	318	3.52%	1,176	13.02%	9,032
Jasper	8,699	48.77%	8,729	48.94%	407	2.28%	-30	-0.17%	17,835
Jefferson	2,863	37.93%	3,248	43.03%	1,437	19.04%	-385	-5.10%	7,548
Johnson	31,174	59.08%	17,899	33.92%	3,696	7.00%	13,275	25.16%	52,769
Jones	4,690	51.30%	4,201	45.95%	252	2.76%	489	5.35%	9,143
Keokuk	2,181	44.09%	2,571	51.97%	195	3.94%	-390	-7.88%	4,947
Kossuth	3,960	44.60%	4,612	51.95%	306	3.45%	-652	-7.35%	8,878
Lee	9,632	58.12%	6,339	38.25%	601	3.63%	3,293	19.87%	16,572
Linn	48,897	53.11%	40,417	43.90%	2,750	2.99%	8,480	9.21%	92,064
Louisa	2,294	49.47%	2,207	47.60%	136	2.93%	87	1.87%	4,637
Lucas	1,934	44.95%	2,262	52.57%	107	2.49%	-328	-7.62%	4,303
Lyon	1,313	24.58%	3,918	73.34%	111	2.08%	-2,605	-48.76%	5,342
Madison	3,093	44.38%	3,662	52.55%	214	3.07%	-569	-8.17%	6,969
Mahaska	3,370	35.31%	5,971	62.57%	202	2.12%	-2,601	-27.26%	9,543
Marion	5,741	39.85%	8,358	58.01%	309	2.14%	-2,617	-18.16%	14,408
Marshall	8,322	47.22%	8,785	49.85%	517	2.93%	-463	-2.63%	17,624
Mills	2,039	34.47%	3,684	62.28%	192	3.25%	-1,645	-27.81%	5,915
Mitchell	2,650	51.34%	2,388	46.26%	124	2.40%	262	5.08%	5,162
Monona	2,086	45.75%	2,304	50.53%	170	3.73%	-218	-4.78%	4,560
Monroe	1,699	46.59%	1,858	50.95%	90	2.47%	-159	-4.36%	3,647
Montgomery	1,838	34.07%	3,417	63.35%	139	2.58%	-1,579	-29.28%	5,394
Muscatine	8,058	50.12%	7,483	46.55%	535	3.33%	575	3.57%	16,076
O'Brien	2,170	30.81%	4,674	66.35%	200	2.84%	-2,504	-35.54%	7,044
Osceola	913	29.81%	2,064	67.38%	86	2.81%	-1,151	-37.57%	3,063
Page	2,293	32.48%	4,588	65.00%	178	2.52%	-2,295	-32.52%	7,059
Palo Alto	2,326	48.23%	2,341	48.54%	156	3.23%	-15	-0.31%	4,823
Plymouth	3,499	34.58%	6,189	61.17%	430	4.25%	-2,690	-26.59%	10,118
Pocahontas	1,736	41.92%	2,242	54.14%	163	3.94%	-506	-12.22%	4,141
Polk	89,715	51.51%	79,927	45.89%	4,525	2.60%	9,788	5.62%	174,167
Pottawattamie	14,726	42.72%	18,783	54.50%	958	2.78%	-4,057	-11.78%	34,467
Poweshiek	4,222	47.02%	4,396	48.95%	362	4.03%	-174	-1.93%	8,980
Ringgold	1,246	46.29%	1,369	50.85%	77	2.86%	-123	-4.56%	2,692
Sac	2,099	41.70%	2,776	55.16%	158	3.14%	-677	-13.46%	5,033
Scott	35,857	50.81%	32,801	46.48%	1,910	2.71%	3,056	4.33%	70,568
Shelby	2,179	36.26%	3,655	60.83%	175	2.91%	-1,476	-24.57%	6,009
Sioux	2,148	14.62%	12,241	83.32%	303	2.06%	-10,093	-68.70%	14,692
Story	17,478	49.42%	16,228	45.89%	1,658	4.69%	1,250	3.53%	35,364
Tama	4,045	48.65%	4,034	48.51%	236	2.84%	11	0.14%	8,315
Taylor	1,247	40.28%	1,770	57.17%	79	2.55%	-523	-16.89%	3,096
Union	2,540	44.25%	3,003	52.32%	197	3.43%	-463	-8.07%	5,740
Van Buren	1,440	40.44%	2,016	56.61%	105	2.95%	-576	-16.17%	3,561
Wapello	8,355	55.19%	6,313	41.70%	471	3.11%	2,042	13.49%	15,139
Warren	9,521	48.45%	9,621	48.95%	511	2.60%	-100	-0.50%	19,653
Washington	3,932	43.24%	4,827	53.08%	335	3.68%	-895	-9.84%	9,094
Wayne	1,300	43.03%	1,666	55.15%	55	1.82%	-366	-12.12%	3,021
Webster	8,479	49.74%	8,172	47.94%	397	2.33%	307	1.80%	17,048
Winnebago	2,691	48.69%	2,662	48.16%	174	3.15%	29	0.53%	5,527
Winneshiek	4,339	46.08%	4,647	49.35%	431	4.58%	-308	-3.27%	9,417
Woodbury	17,691	46.68%	18,864	49.78%	1,341	3.54%	-1,173	-3.10%	37,896
Worth	2,208	55.14%	1,659	41.43%	137	3.42%	549	13.71%	4,004
Wright	2,796	44.13%	3,384	53.41%	156	2.46%	-588	-9.28%	6,336
Totals	638,517	48.54%	634,373	48.22%	42,673	3.24%	4,144	0.32%	1,315,563

===== Counties that flipped from Democratic to Republican =====
- Adair (largest city: Greenfield)
- Adams (largest city: Corning)
- Allamakee (largest city: Waukon)
- Appanoose (largest city: Centerville)
- Audubon (largest city: Audubon)
- Bremer (largest city: Waverly)
- Butler (largest city: Parkersburg)
- Calhoun (largest city: Rockwell City)
- Carroll (largest city: Carroll)
- Cherokee (largest city: Cherokee)
- Clay (largest city: Spencer)
- Crawford (largest city: Denison)
- Dallas (largest city: Waukee)
- Davis (largest city: Bloomfield)
- Decatur (largest city: Lamoni)
- Delaware (largest city: Manchester)
- Dickinson (largest city: Spirit Lake)
- Emmet (largest city: Estherville)
- Fayette (largest city: Oelwein)
- Franklin (largest city: Hampton)
- Guthrie (largest city: Guthrie Center)
- Hamilton (largest city: Webster City)
- Hancock (largest city: Garner)
- Hardin (largest city: Iowa Falls)
- Henry (largest city: Mount Pleasant)
- Iowa (largest city: Williamsburg)
- Jasper (largest city: Newton)
- Jefferson (largest city: Fairfield)
- Keokuk (largest city: Sigourney)
- Kossuth (largest city: Algona)
- Lucas (largest city: Chariton)
- Madison (largest city: Winterset)
- Marshall (largest city: Marshalltown)
- Monona (largest city: Onawa)
- Monroe (largest city: Albia)
- Palo Alto (largest city: Emmetsburg)
- Pocahontas (largest city: Pocahontas)
- Poweshiek (largest city: Grinnell)
- Ringgold (largest city: Mount Ayr)
- Taylor (largest city: Bedford)
- Union (largest city: Creston)
- Van Buren (largest city: Keosauqua)
- Warren (largest city: Indianola)
- Washington (largest city: Washington)
- Wayne (largest city: Corydon)
- Winneshiek (largest city: Decorah)
- Woodbury (largest city: Sioux City)
- Wright (largest city: Eagle Grove)

==== By congressional district ====
Despite losing the state, Bush won three of five congressional districts, including one held by a Democrat. Gore won two districts, both held by Republicans.

District	Gore	Bush	Representative
1st	53%	43%	Jim Leach
2nd	51%	45%	Jim Nussle
3rd	47%	49%	Leonard Boswell
4th	48%	50%	Greg Ganske
5th	42%	55%	Tom Latham

== Electors ==
Technically the voters of Iowa cast their ballots for electors: representatives to the Electoral College. Iowa is allocated seven electors because it has five congressional districts and two senators. All candidates who appear on the ballot or qualify to receive write-in votes must submit a list of seven electors, who pledge to vote for their candidate and their running mate. Whoever wins the majority of votes in the state is awarded all seven electoral votes. Their chosen electors then vote for President and Vice President. Although electors are pledged to their candidate and running mate, they are not obligated to vote for them. An elector who votes for someone other than their candidate is known as a faithless elector.

The electors of each state and the District of Columbia met on December 18, 2000 to cast their votes for President and Vice President. The Electoral College itself never meets as one body. Instead, the electors from each state and the District of Columbia met in their respective capitols.

The following were the members of the Electoral College from the state. All were pledged to and voted for Al Gore and Joe Lieberman:

1. Jeff Heland
2. Angelyn King
3. Paulee Lipsman
4. Emil Pavich
5. John O'Brien
6. Ernest Ricehill
7. Evan Giesen
8. David Tingwald

== See also ==
- United States presidential elections in Iowa
