= Hancock County, Iowa =

County in Iowa, United States

- County
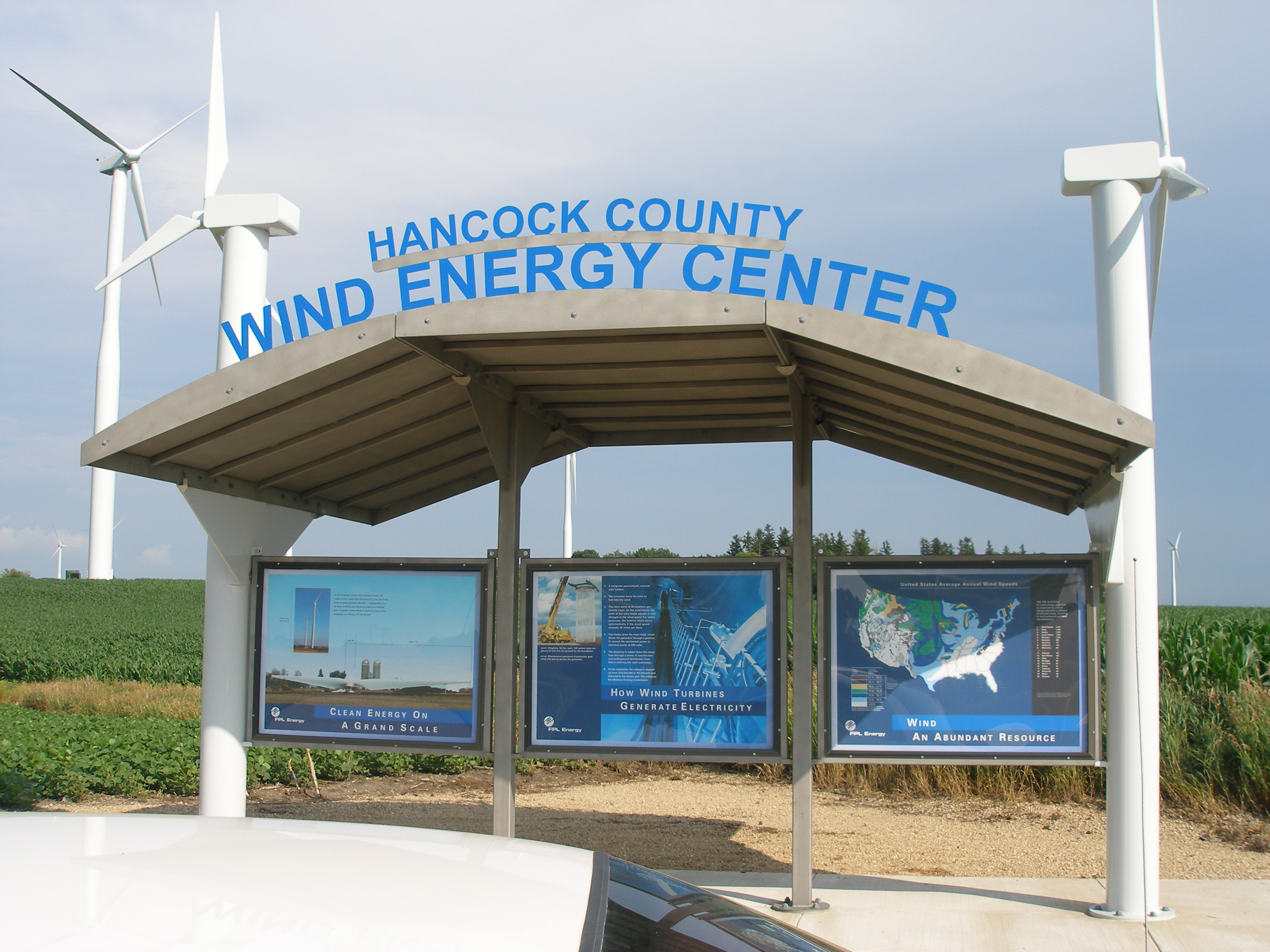
- Visitor kiosk at the 148 wind turbine farm

- Location within the U.S. state of Iowa
- Coordinates: 43°05′00″N 93°44′11″W
- Country: United States
- State: Iowa
- Founded: 1851
- Named for: John Hancock
- Seat: Garner
- Largest city: Garner

Area
  - Total: 573 sq mi (1,480 km^{2})
  - Land: 571 sq mi (1,480 km^{2})
  - Water: 2.0 sq mi (5.2 km^{2}) 0.4%

Population (2020)
  - Total: 10,795
  - Estimate (2025): 10,528 ▼
  - Density: 18.9/sq mi (7.30/km^{2})
- Time zone: UTC−6 (Central)
  - Summer (DST): UTC−5 (CDT)
- Congressional district: 4th
- Website: hancockcountyia.gov
- Iowa county number 41

Hancock County is a county in the north-central portion of the U.S. state of Iowa. As of the 2020 census, the population was 10,795. The county seat is Garner. The county was founded on January 15, 1851, and named in honor of John Hancock, a leader of the Continental Congress during the American Revolution.

== Geography ==
According to the U.S. Census Bureau, the county has an area of 573 square miles (1,480 km^{2}), of which 571 square miles (1,480 km^{2}) is land and 2.0 square miles (5.2 km^{2}) (0.4%) is water.

=== Major highways ===
- U.S. Highway 18
- U.S. Highway 69
- Iowa Highway 17

=== Adjacent counties ===
- Winnebago County (north)
- Cerro Gordo County (east)
- Wright County (south)
- Kossuth County (west)

== History ==
Hancock County was established as a result of an election on June 28, 1858. At the time two townships, Avery and Madison, were also established. Soon after a courthouse was built in Garner, Iowa that continues to be the county seat.

== Demographics ==
Historical population
| Census | Pop. | Note | %± |
|---|---|---|---|
| 1860 | 179 | | — |
| 1870 | 999 | | 458.1% |
| 1880 | 3,453 | | 245.6% |
| 1890 | 7,621 | | 120.7% |
| 1900 | 13,752 | | 80.4% |
| 1910 | 12,731 | | −7.4% |
| 1920 | 14,723 | | 15.6% |
| 1930 | 14,802 | | 0.5% |
| 1940 | 15,402 | | 4.1% |
| 1950 | 15,077 | | −2.1% |
| 1960 | 14,604 | | −3.1% |
| 1970 | 13,506 | | −7.5% |
| 1980 | 13,833 | | 2.4% |
| 1990 | 12,638 | | −8.6% |
| 2000 | 12,100 | | −4.3% |
| 2010 | 11,341 | | −6.3% |
| 2020 | 10,795 | | −4.8% |
| 2025 (est.) | 10,528 | ▼ | −2.5% |
U.S. Decennial Census; 1790–1960 1900–1990; 1990–2000 2010–2020

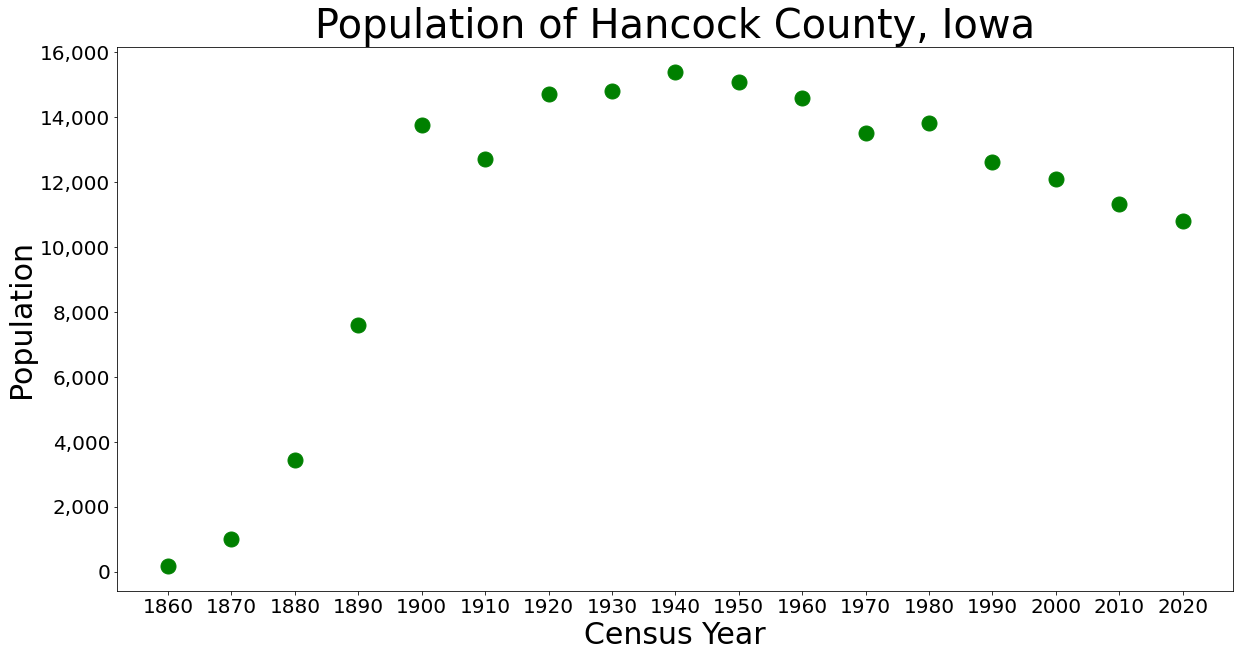
Population of Hancock County from US census data

=== 2020 census ===
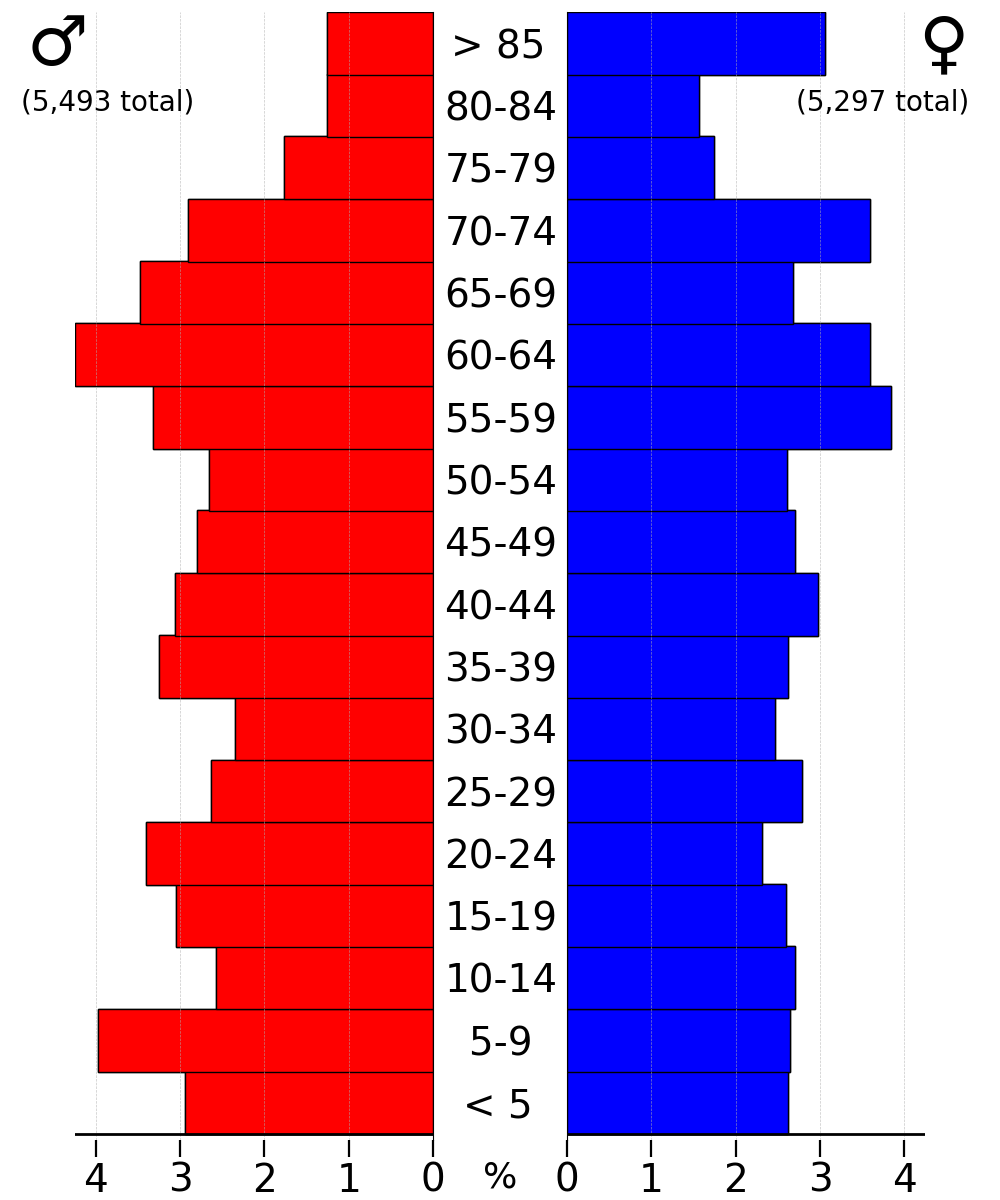
2022 US Census population pyramid for Hancock County from ACS 5-year estimates

As of the 2020 census, the county had a population of 10,795, a population density of 18.9/sq mi (7.3/km^{2}), and 95.32% of the population reported being of one race.

The median age was 45.4 years, 22.1% of residents were under the age of 18, and 24.1% of residents were 65 years of age or older; for every 100 females there were 100.8 males, and for every 100 females age 18 and over there were 98.5 males age 18 and over.

The racial makeup of the county was 92.3% White, 0.7% Black or African American, 0.4% American Indian and Alaska Native, 0.2% Asian, <0.1% Native Hawaiian and Pacific Islander, 1.7% from some other race, and 4.7% from two or more races. Hispanic or Latino residents of any race comprised 5.7% of the population.

<0.1% of residents lived in urban areas, while 100.0% lived in rural areas.

There were 4,585 households in the county, of which 26.3% had children under the age of 18 living in them, 54.9% were married-couple households, 18.2% were households with a male householder and no spouse or partner present, and 20.6% were households with a female householder and no spouse or partner present. About 29.1% of all households were made up of individuals and 15.2% had someone living alone who was 65 years of age or older.

There were 5,113 housing units, of which 4,585 were occupied and 10.3% were vacant. Among the occupied units, 79.9% were owner-occupied and 20.1% were renter-occupied; the homeowner vacancy rate was 1.6% and the rental vacancy rate was 8.7%.

Hancock County Racial Composition
| Race | Number | Percent |
|---|---|---|
| White (NH) | 9,813 | 91% |
| Black or African American (NH) | 76 | 0.7% |
| Native American (NH) | 22 | 0.2% |
| Asian (NH) | 25 | 0.23% |
| Pacific Islander (NH) | 0 | 0% |
| Other/Mixed (NH) | 245 | 2.3% |
| Hispanic or Latino | 614 | 5.7% |

=== 2010 census ===
The 2010 census recorded a population of 11,341 in the county, with a population density of 19.9/sq mi (7.7/km^{2}). There were 5,330 housing units, of which 4,741 were occupied.

=== 2000 census ===
At the 2000 census there were 12,100 people, 4,795 households, and 3,375 families in the county. The population density was 21 people per square mile (8.1 people/km^{2}). There were 5,164 housing units at an average density of 9 units per square mile (3.5 units/km^{2}). The racial makeup of the county was 97.70% White, 0.09% Black or African American, 0.10% Native American, 0.31% Asian, 0.02% Pacific Islander, 1.38% from other races, and 0.40% from two or more races. 2.49%. were Hispanic or Latino of any race.

Of the 4,795 households 32.60% had children under the age of 18 living with them, 60.90% were married couples living together, 6.00% had a female householder with no husband present, and 29.60% were non-families. 26.50% of households were one person and 13.70% were one person aged 65 or older. The average household size was 2.48 and the average family size was 3.01.

The age distribution was 26.50% under the age of 18, 6.60% from 18 to 24, 25.50% from 25 to 44, 23.50% from 45 to 64, and 17.90% 65 or older. The median age was 40 years. For every 100 females there were 96.80 males. For every 100 females age 18 and over, there were 95.00 males.

The median household income was $37,703 and the median family income was $44,248. Males had a median income of $29,452 versus $20,376 for females. The per capita income for the county was $17,957. About 5.20% of families and 6.00% of the population were below the poverty line, including 6.90% of those under age 18 and 6.90% of those age 65 or over.

== Economy ==
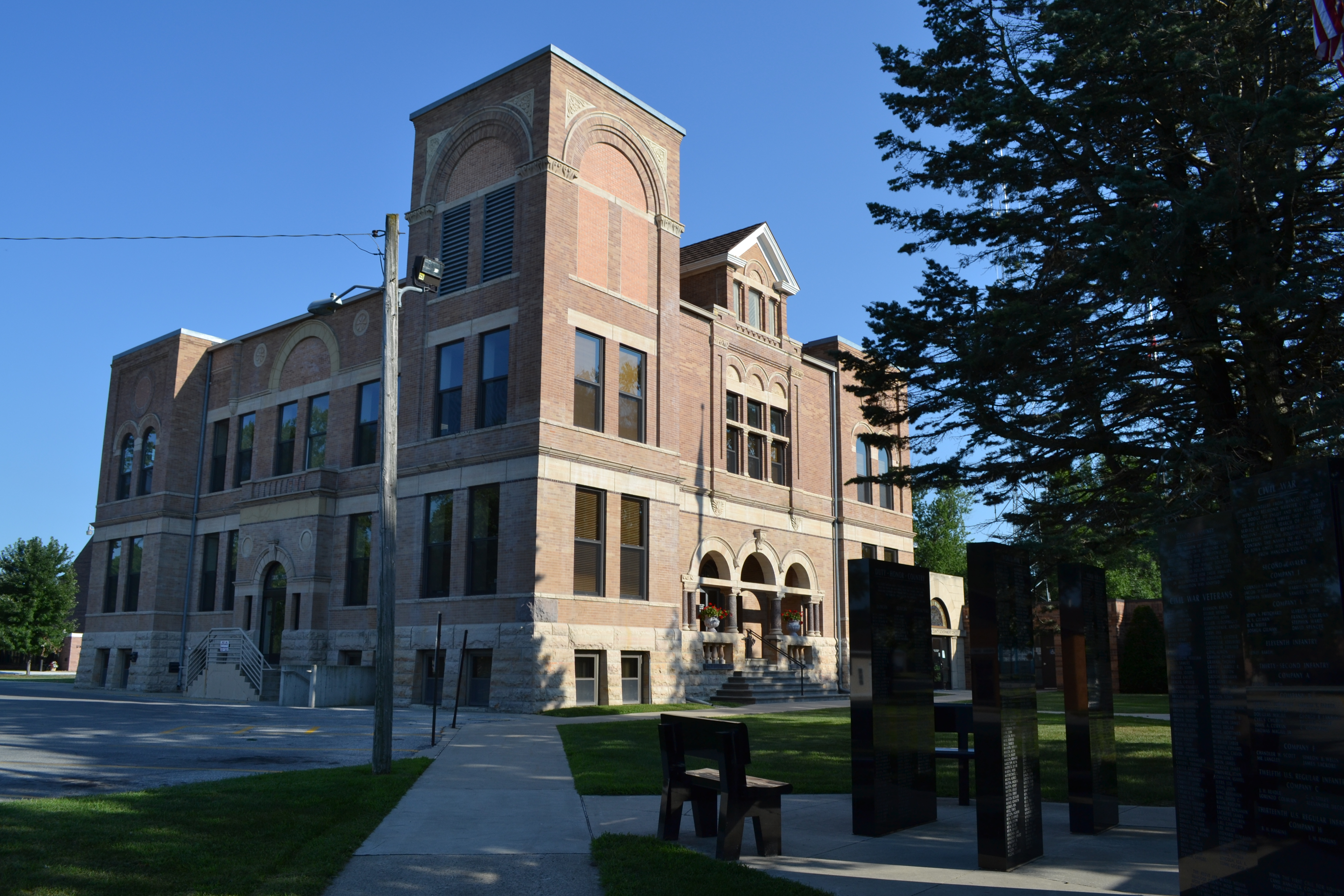
Hancock County courthouse

As of December 2008, the unemployment rate in Hancock County was 9.1%, a sharp rise from 4.0% in December 2007. In 2016 the unemployment rate dropped back to 2.2%.

== Communities ==
=== Cities ===
- Britt
- Corwith
- Crystal Lake
- Forest City (part)
- Garner
- Goodell
- Kanawha
- Klemme
- Woden

=== Census-designated places ===
- Duncan
- Hayfield
- Hutchins
- Miller

=== Other unincorporated community ===
- Stilson

=== Townships ===
Hancock County is divided into sixteen townships:

- Amsterdam
- Avery
- Bingham
- Boone
- Britt
- Concord
- Crystal
- Ell
- Ellington
- Erin
- Garfield
- Liberty
- Madison
- Magor
- Orthel
- Twin Lake

=== Population ranking ===
The population ranking of the following table is based on the 2020 census of Hancock County. † county seat

| Rank | City/Town/etc. | Municipal type | Population (2020 Census) |
|---|---|---|---|
| 1 | Forest City (partially in Winnebago County) | City | 4,285 |
| 2 | † Garner | City | 3,065 |
| 3 | Britt | City | 2,044 |
| 4 | Kanawha | City | 658 |
| 5 | Klemme | City | 441 |
| 6 | Corwith | City | 266 |
| 7 | Crystal Lake | City | 253 |
| 8 | Woden | City | 188 |
| 9 | Goodell | City | 140 |
| 10 | Duncan | CDP | 57 |
| 11 | Miller | CDP | 50 |
| 12 | Hayfield | CDP | 41 |
| 13 | Hutchins | CDP | 22 |

== Politics ==
United States presidential election results for Hancock County, Iowa
| Year | Republican | | Democratic | | Third party(ies) | |
| Year | No. | % | No. | % | No. | % |
|---|---|---|---|---|---|---|
| 1896 | 1,975 | 65.64% | 1,007 | 33.47% | 27 | 0.90% |
| 1900 | 2,186 | 71.32% | 827 | 26.98% | 52 | 1.70% |
| 1904 | 2,112 | 78.40% | 517 | 19.19% | 65 | 2.41% |
| 1908 | 1,750 | 67.15% | 804 | 30.85% | 52 | 2.00% |
| 1912 | 860 | 34.30% | 710 | 28.32% | 937 | 37.38% |
| 1916 | 1,726 | 64.43% | 913 | 34.08% | 40 | 1.49% |
| 1920 | 3,617 | 80.84% | 725 | 16.20% | 132 | 2.95% |
| 1924 | 3,183 | 59.62% | 550 | 10.30% | 1,606 | 30.08% |
| 1928 | 3,114 | 61.12% | 1,933 | 37.94% | 48 | 0.94% |
| 1932 | 2,355 | 37.66% | 3,822 | 61.11% | 77 | 1.23% |
| 1936 | 2,585 | 39.00% | 3,930 | 59.28% | 114 | 1.72% |
| 1940 | 3,632 | 50.63% | 3,514 | 48.99% | 27 | 0.38% |
| 1944 | 3,114 | 51.87% | 2,855 | 47.56% | 34 | 0.57% |
| 1948 | 2,802 | 46.31% | 3,096 | 51.17% | 153 | 2.53% |
| 1952 | 5,115 | 71.26% | 2,053 | 28.60% | 10 | 0.14% |
| 1956 | 4,305 | 60.51% | 2,803 | 39.40% | 6 | 0.08% |
| 1960 | 4,179 | 60.24% | 2,757 | 39.74% | 1 | 0.01% |
| 1964 | 2,269 | 37.00% | 3,857 | 62.89% | 7 | 0.11% |
| 1968 | 3,544 | 59.57% | 2,131 | 35.82% | 274 | 4.61% |
| 1972 | 3,706 | 60.47% | 2,349 | 38.33% | 74 | 1.21% |
| 1976 | 3,127 | 50.54% | 2,975 | 48.08% | 85 | 1.37% |
| 1980 | 3,681 | 60.42% | 1,918 | 31.48% | 493 | 8.09% |
| 1984 | 3,362 | 56.62% | 2,539 | 42.76% | 37 | 0.62% |
| 1988 | 2,731 | 48.83% | 2,831 | 50.62% | 31 | 0.55% |
| 1992 | 2,428 | 41.82% | 2,175 | 37.46% | 1,203 | 20.72% |
| 1996 | 2,353 | 44.32% | 2,399 | 45.19% | 557 | 10.49% |
| 2000 | 2,988 | 54.95% | 2,281 | 41.95% | 169 | 3.11% |
| 2004 | 3,368 | 57.04% | 2,484 | 42.07% | 53 | 0.90% |
| 2008 | 3,016 | 50.86% | 2,805 | 47.30% | 109 | 1.84% |
| 2012 | 3,317 | 55.98% | 2,521 | 42.55% | 87 | 1.47% |
| 2016 | 3,977 | 67.74% | 1,587 | 27.03% | 307 | 5.23% |
| 2020 | 4,390 | 71.13% | 1,683 | 27.27% | 99 | 1.60% |
| 2024 | 4,336 | 73.01% | 1,523 | 25.64% | 80 | 1.35% |

== Education ==
School districts include:

- Algona Community School District
- Belmond–Klemme Community School District
- Clarion–Goldfield–Dows Community School District
- Forest City Community School District
- Garner–Hayfield–Ventura Community School District - Established on July 1, 2015.
- West Fork Community School District - Established on July 1, 2011.
- West Hancock Community School District

Former school districts:

- Corwith–Wesley Community School District, dissolved on July 1, 2015.
- Lu Verne Community School District, consolidated into Algona CSD on July 1, 2023.
- Sheffield–Chapin–Meservey–Thornton Community School District (SCMT), consolidated into West Fork CSD on July 1, 2011.
- Titonka Consolidated School District, consolidated into Algona CSD on July 1, 2014.
- Ventura Community School District, consolidated into Garner-Hayfield-Ventura on July 1, 2015.
- Woden–Crystal Lake Community School District, consolidated into Forest City on July 1, 2013, with a portion going to West Fork.

== See also ==
- Hancock County Courthouse
- National Register of Historic Places listings in Hancock County, Iowa
