= Hayfield, Iowa =

- Census-designated place
- Location within Iowa Location within the United States
- Coordinates: 43°10′43″N 93°41′41″W
- Country: United States
- State: Iowa
- County: Hancock

Area
  - Total: 0.97 sq mi (2.52 km^{2})
  - Land: 0.97 sq mi (2.52 km^{2})
  - Water: 0 sq mi (0.00 km^{2})
- Elevation: 1,237 ft (377 m)

Population (2020)
  - Total: 41
  - Density: 42.1/sq mi (16.26/km^{2})
- Time zone: UTC-6 (CST)
- ZIP code: 50438
- Area code: 641
- FIPS code: 19-35490
- GNIS feature ID: 2585479

Hayfield is an unincorporated community and census-designated place (CDP) in Hancock County, Iowa, United States. As of the 2020 census the population was 41.

== History ==
Hayfield was platted in 1891. Hayfield's population was 40 in 1902.

== Demographics ==
Historical population
Census	Pop.	Note	%±
2010	43		—
2020	41		−4.7%
U.S. Decennial Census

=== 2020 census ===
As of the census of 2020, there were 41 people, 22 households, and 11 families residing in the community. The population density was 42.1 inhabitants per square mile (16.3/km^{2}). There were 23 housing units at an average density of 23.6 per square mile (9.1/km^{2}). The racial makeup of the community was 90.2% White, 0.0% Black or African American, 0.0% Native American, 0.0% Asian, 0.0% Pacific Islander, 0.0% from other races and 9.8% from two or more races. Hispanic or Latino persons of any race comprised 9.8% of the population.

Of the 22 households, 27.3% of which had children under the age of 18 living with them, 50.0% were married couples living together, 0.0% were cohabitating couples, 0.0% had a female householder with no spouse or partner present and 50.0% had a male householder with no spouse or partner present. 50.0% of all households were non-families. 50.0% of all households were made up of individuals, 22.7% had someone living alone who was 65 years old or older.

The median age in the community was 44.1 years. 14.6% of the residents were under the age of 20; 17.1% were between the ages of 20 and 24; 26.8% were from 25 and 44; 12.2% were from 45 and 64; and 29.3% were 65 years of age or older. The gender makeup of the community was 65.9% male and 34.1% female.

== Education ==
Hayfield is a part of the Garner–Hayfield–Ventura Community School District. It was previously in the Garner–Hayfield Community School District, which merged into the current GHV district on July 1, 2015.
