= Betty Grundberg =

American politician (1938–2022)

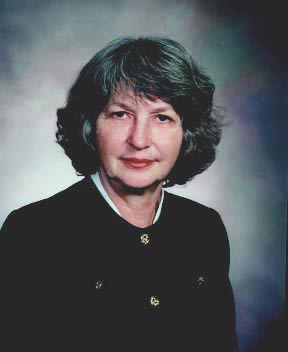

Member of the Iowa House of Representatives from the 73rd district
- In office January 11, 1993 – January 12, 2003
- Preceded by: William Bernau
- Succeeded by: Jodi Tymeson

Personal details
- Born: February 16, 1938 Woden, Iowa, United States
- Died: April 8, 2022 (age 84)
- Party: Republican
- Spouse: Arnie Grundberg
- Children: 4
- Occupation: Businesswoman

Betty Alice Grundberg (February 16, 1938 – April 8, 2022) was an American politician in the state of Iowa.

Grundberg was born Betty Meyer in Woden, Iowa and attended Wartburg College and the University of Iowa. She became a high school teacher and served for sixteen years on the Des Moines School Board, including a stint as president. A Republican, she was a member of the Iowa House of Representatives from 1993 to 2003 for the 73rd district.
