= Stilson, Iowa =

- Unincorporated community
- Location within Iowa
- Coordinates: 43°02′18″N 93°53′07″W
- Country: United States
- State: Iowa
- County: Hancock
- Elevation: 1,204 ft (367 m)
- Time zone: UTC-6 (Central (CST))
  - Summer (DST): UTC-5 (CDT)
- Area code: 641
- GNIS feature ID: 455630

Stilson is an unincorporated community in Hancock County, Iowa, United States.

== History ==
Stilson was platted in 1893. The community's population was 95 in 1902, and 160 in 1925. The population was 50 in 1940.
