= Duncan, Iowa =

- Census-designated place
- Location within Iowa Location within the United States
- Coordinates: 43°06′19″N 93°42′21″W
- Country: USA
- State: Iowa
- County: Hancock

Area
  - Total: 0.79 sq mi (2.05 km^{2})
  - Land: 0.78 sq mi (2.03 km^{2})
  - Water: 0.0077 sq mi (0.02 km^{2})
- Elevation: 1,237 ft (377 m)

Population (2020)
  - Total: 57
  - Density: 72.6/sq mi (28.02/km^{2})
- Time zone: UTC-6 (CST)
- ZIP code: 50423
- Area code: 641
- FIPS code: 19-22710
- GNIS feature ID: 2585478

Duncan is a census-designated place (CDP) in Hancock County, Iowa, United States. The population was 57 at the 2020 census.

== History ==
Duncan was platted in 1900. The community's population was 25 in 1902, and 20 in 1925. The population was 75 in 1940.

== Geography ==
Duncan is located 4.6 miles (7.4 km) east of Britt and 5.4 miles (8.7 km) west of Garner, along U.S. Route 18.

According to the United States Census Bureau, the CDP has a total area of 0.79 square miles (2.05 km^{2}), of which 0.78 square miles (2.03 km^{2}) is land and 0.0077 square miles (0.02 km^{2}), or 0.90%, is water.

== Demographics ==
Historical population
Census	Pop.	Note	%±
2010	131		—
2020	57		−56.5%
U.S. Decennial Census

=== 2020 census ===
As of the census of 2020, there were 57 people, 32 households, and 23 families residing in the community. The population density was 72.6 inhabitants per square mile (28.0/km^{2}). There were 32 housing units at an average density of 40.7 per square mile (15.7/km^{2}). The racial makeup of the community was 98.2% White, 0.0% Black or African American, 0.0% Native American, 0.0% Asian, 0.0% Pacific Islander, 0.0% from other races and 1.8% from two or more races. Hispanic or Latino persons of any race comprised 0.0% of the population.

Of the 32 households, 37.5% of which had children under the age of 18 living with them, 68.8% were married couples living together, 9.4% were cohabitating couples, 3.1% had a female householder with no spouse or partner present and 18.8% had a male householder with no spouse or partner present. 28.1% of all households were non-families. 21.9% of all households were made up of individuals, 9.4% had someone living alone who was 65 years old or older.

The median age in the community was 48.3 years. 17.5% of the residents were under the age of 20; 1.8% were between the ages of 20 and 24; 26.3% were from 25 and 44; 24.6% were from 45 and 64; and 29.8% were 65 years of age or older. The gender makeup of the community was 63.2% male and 36.8% female.

== Education ==
Duncan is a part of the Garner–Hayfield–Ventura Community School District. It was previously in the Garner–Hayfield Community School District, which merged into the current GHV district on July 1, 2015.
