= Goodell, Iowa =

- City
- Location of Goodell, Iowa
- Coordinates: 42°55′26″N 93°36′51″W
- Country: US
- State: Iowa
- County: Hancock

Area
  - Total: 0.43 sq mi (1.12 km^{2})
  - Land: 0.43 sq mi (1.12 km^{2})
  - Water: 0 sq mi (0.00 km^{2})
- Elevation: 1,247 ft (380 m)

Population (2020)
  - Total: 140
  - Density: 324.4/sq mi (125.24/km^{2})
- Time zone: UTC-6 (Central (CST))
  - Summer (DST): UTC-5 (CDT)
- ZIP code: 50439
- Area code: 641
- FIPS code: 19-31575
- GNIS feature ID: 2394928

Goodell is a city in Hancock County, Iowa, United States. The population was 140 at the time of the 2020 census.

== History ==
Goodell was platted in 1884.

== Geography ==
According to the United States Census Bureau, the city has a total area of 0.43 square miles (1.11 km^{2}), all land.

== Demographics ==
Historical populations
Year	Pop.	±%
1900	254	—
1910	240	−5.5%
1920	245	+2.1%
1930	210	−14.3%
1940	236	+12.4%
1950	242	+2.5%
1960	231	−4.5%
1970	218	−5.6%
1980	220	+0.9%
1990	201	−8.6%
2000	174	−13.4%
2010	139	−20.1%
2020	140	+0.7%
Source:"U.S. Census website". United States Census Bureau. and Iowa Data Center; Source: U.S. Decennial Census

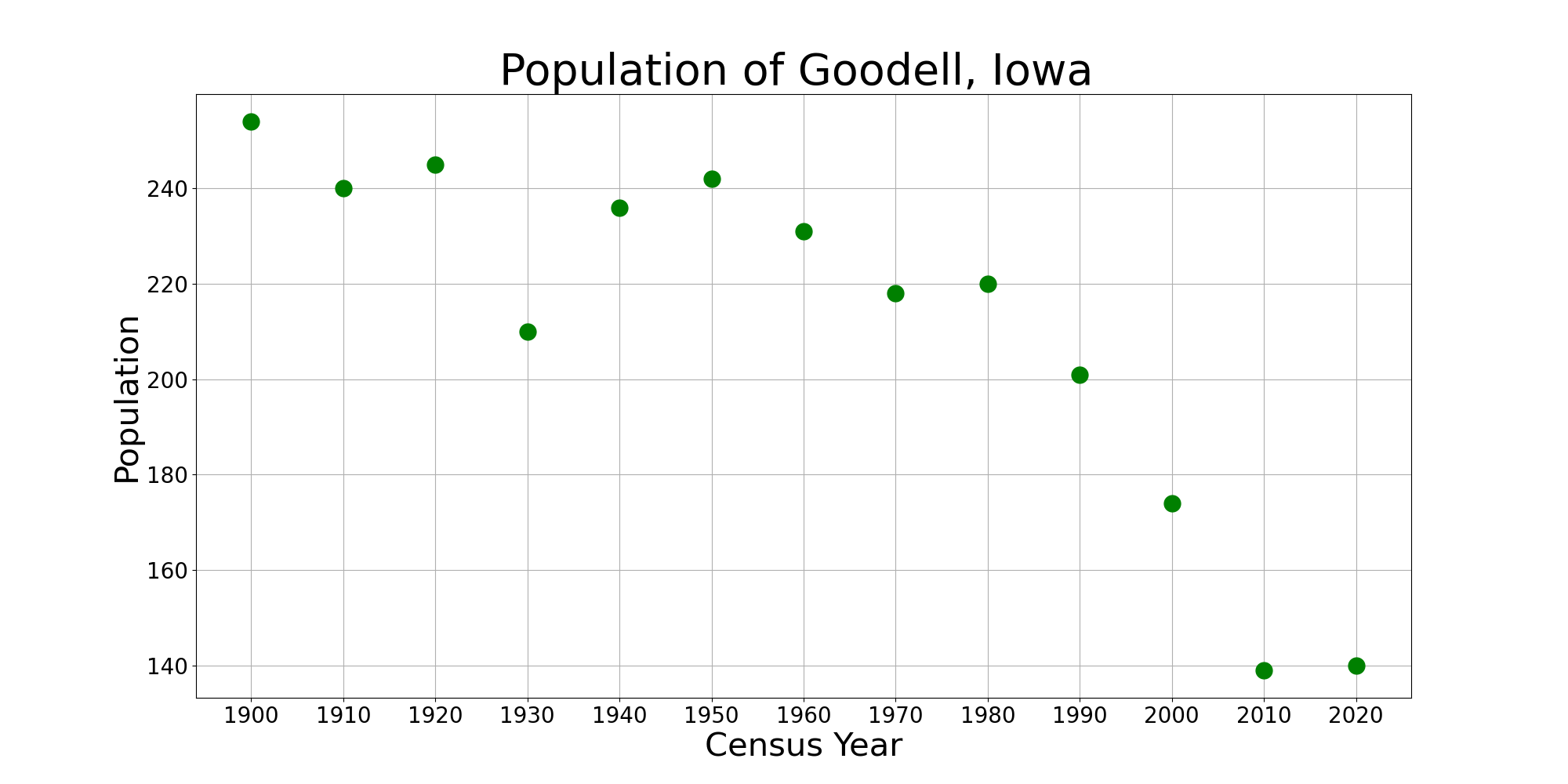
The population of Goodell, Iowa from US census data

=== 2020 census ===
As of the census of 2020, there were 140 people, 57 households, and 40 families residing in the city. The population density was 324.4 inhabitants per square mile (125.2/km^{2}). There were 74 housing units at an average density of 171.5 per square mile (66.2/km^{2}). The racial makeup of the city was 78.6% White, 0.0% Black or African American, 0.0% Native American, 0.0% Asian, 0.7% Pacific Islander, 9.3% from other races and 11.4% from two or more races. Hispanic or Latino persons of any race comprised 19.3% of the population.

Of the 57 households, 38.6% of which had children under the age of 18 living with them, 42.1% were married couples living together, 12.3% were cohabitating couples, 22.8% had a female householder with no spouse or partner present and 22.8% had a male householder with no spouse or partner present. 29.8% of all households were non-families. 24.6% of all households were made up of individuals, 8.8% had someone living alone who was 65 years old or older.

The median age in the city was 40.0 years. 24.3% of the residents were under the age of 20; 5.7% were between the ages of 20 and 24; 28.6% were from 25 and 44; 30.7% were from 45 and 64; and 10.7% were 65 years of age or older. The gender makeup of the city was 49.3% male and 50.7% female.

=== 2010 census ===
As of the census of 2010, there were 139 people, 69 households, and 36 families living in the city. The population density was 323.3 inhabitants per square mile (124.8/km^{2}). There were 77 housing units at an average density of 179.1 per square mile (69.2/km^{2}). The racial makeup of the city was 95.0% White and 5.0% from other races. Hispanic or Latino of any race were 11.5% of the population.

There were 69 households, of which 15.9% had children under the age of 18 living with them, 40.6% were married couples living together, 8.7% had a female householder with no husband present, 2.9% had a male householder with no wife present, and 47.8% were non-families. 34.8% of all households were made up of individuals, and 8.6% had someone living alone who was 65 years of age or older. The average household size was 2.01 and the average family size was 2.42.

The median age in the city was 50.9 years. 11.5% of residents were under the age of 18; 4.3% were between the ages of 18 and 24; 18.8% were from 25 to 44; 46.1% were from 45 to 64; and 19.4% were 65 years of age or older. The gender makeup of the city was 53.2% male and 46.8% female.

=== 2000 census ===
As of the census of 2000, there were 179 people, 78 households, and 47 families living in the city. The population density was 406.1 inhabitants per square mile (156.8/km^{2}). There were 86 housing units at an average density of 200.7 per square mile (77.5/km^{2}). The racial makeup of the city was 92.53% White, 6.32% from other races, and 1.15% from two or more races. Hispanic or Latino of any race were 6.32% of the population.

There were 78 households, out of which 28.2% had children under the age of 18 living with them, 50.0% were married couples living together, 6.4% had a female householder with no husband present, and 39.7% were non-families. 35.9% of all households were made up of individuals, and 6.4% had someone living alone who was 65 years of age or older. The average household size was 2.23 and the average family size was 2.94.

In the city, the population was spread out, with 22.4% under the age of 18, 6.9% from 18 to 24, 31.0% from 25 to 44, 28.7% from 45 to 64, and 10.9% who were 65 years of age or older. The median age was 42 years. For every 100 females, there were 109.6 males. For every 100 females age 18 and over, there were 117.7 males.

The median income for a household in the city was $32,292, and the median income for a family was $40,625. Males had a median income of $25,714 versus $27,083 for females. The per capita income for the city was $14,795. About 4.7% of families and 3.0% of the population were below the poverty line, including none of those under the age of eighteen or sixty five or over.

== Education ==
Belmond–Klemme Community School District serves the community. The district formed on July 1, 1994, with the merger of the Belmond and Klemme districts.
