= Crystal Lake, Iowa =

- City
- Location of Crystal Lake, Iowa
- Coordinates: 43°13′23″N 93°47′34″W
- Country: USA
- State: Iowa
- County: Hancock

Area
  - Total: 0.25 sq mi (0.64 km^{2})
  - Land: 0.25 sq mi (0.64 km^{2})
  - Water: 0 sq mi (0.00 km^{2})
- Elevation: 1,276 ft (389 m)

Population (2020)
  - Total: 253
  - Density: 1,020.3/sq mi (393.93/km^{2})
- Time zone: UTC-6 (Central (CST))
  - Summer (DST): UTC-5 (CDT)
- ZIP code: 50432
- Area code: 641
- FIPS code: 19-17670
- GNIS feature ID: 2393686

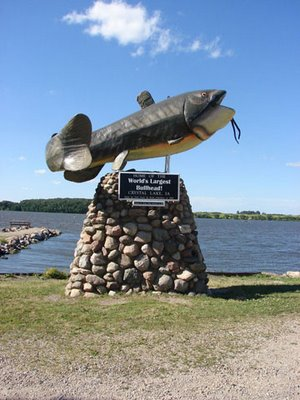
The world's largest Bullhead

Crystal Lake is a city in Hancock County, Iowa, United States. The population was 253 at the 2020 census.

== History ==
Crystal Lake was platted in 1898, and incorporated as a city in 1899.

== Geography ==
According to the United States Census Bureau, the city has a total area of 0.26 square miles (0.67 km^{2}), all land.

The city of Crystal Lake is located on the south shore of Crystal Lake, a popular fishing location.

== Demographics ==
Historical populations
Year	Pop.	±%
1900	246	—
1910	143	−41.9%
1920	191	+33.6%
1930	271	+41.9%
1940	301	+11.1%
1950	286	−5.0%
1960	267	−6.6%
1970	276	+3.4%
1980	314	+13.8%
1990	266	−15.3%
2000	285	+7.1%
2010	250	−12.3%
2020	253	+1.2%
Source:"U.S. Census website". United States Census Bureau. and Iowa Data Center; Source: U.S. Decennial Census

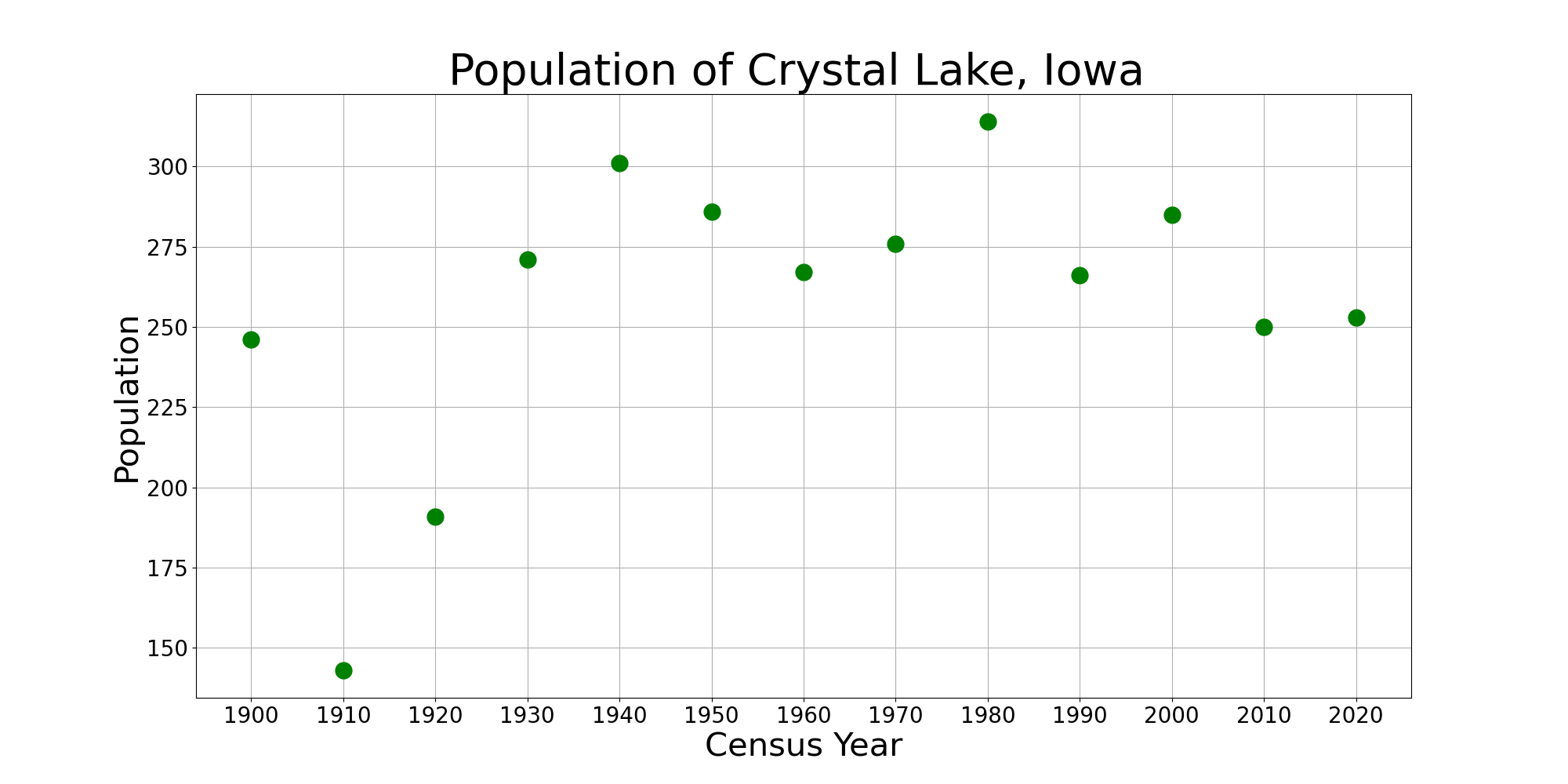
The population of Crystal Lake, Iowa from US census data

=== 2020 census ===
As of the census of 2020, there were 253 people, 102 households, and 60 families residing in the city. The population density was 1,020.3 inhabitants per square mile (393.9/km^{2}). There were 134 housing units at an average density of 540.4 per square mile (208.6/km^{2}). The racial makeup of the city was 91.7% White, 0.4% Black or African American, 0.0% Native American, 0.8% Asian, 0.0% Pacific Islander, 1.2% from other races and 5.9% from two or more races. Hispanic or Latino persons of any race comprised 7.9% of the population.

Of the 102 households, 27.5% of which had children under the age of 18 living with them, 40.2% were married couples living together, 8.8% were cohabitating couples, 31.4% had a female householder with no spouse or partner present and 19.6% had a male householder with no spouse or partner present. 41.2% of all households were non-families. 34.3% of all households were made up of individuals, 15.7% had someone living alone who was 65 years old or older.

The median age in the city was 47.7 years. 24.1% of the residents were under the age of 20; 3.2% were between the ages of 20 and 24; 20.6% were from 25 and 44; 28.1% were from 45 and 64; and 24.1% were 65 years of age or older. The gender makeup of the city was 49.4% male and 50.6% female.

=== 2010 census ===
As of the census of 2010, there were 250 people, 121 households, and 69 families residing in the city. The population density was 961.5 inhabitants per square mile (371.2/km^{2}). There were 140 housing units at an average density of 538.5 per square mile (207.9/km^{2}). The racial makeup of the city was 97.2% White, 1.6% African American, 0.4% Native American, and 0.8% from two or more races. Hispanic or Latino of any race were 4.0% of the population.

There were 121 households, of which 19.8% had children under the age of 18 living with them, 40.5% were married couples living together, 12.4% had a female householder with no husband present, 4.1% had a male householder with no wife present, and 43.0% were non-families. 36.4% of all households were made up of individuals, and 13.2% had someone living alone who was 65 years of age or older. The average household size was 2.07 and the average family size was 2.65.

The median age in the city was 47.8 years. 18% of residents were under the age of 18; 7.6% were between the ages of 18 and 24; 18.4% were from 25 to 44; 33.6% were from 45 to 64; and 22.4% were 65 years of age or older. The gender makeup of the city was 48.4% male and 51.6% female.

=== 2000 census ===
As of the census of 2000, there were 285 people, 127 households, and 75 families residing in the city. The population density was 1,118.6 inhabitants per square mile (431.9/km^{2}). There were 141 housing units at an average density of 553.4 per square mile (213.7/km^{2}). The racial makeup of the city was 99.65% White and 0.35% Asian. Hispanic or Latino of any race were 1.40% of the population.

There were 127 households, out of which 23.6% had children under the age of 18 living with them, 46.5% were married couples living together, 7.9% had a female householder with no husband present, and 40.9% were non-families. 32.3% of all households were made up of individuals, and 14.2% had someone living alone who was 65 years of age or older. The average household size was 2.24 and the average family size was 2.81.

In the city, the population was spread out, with 21.1% under the age of 18, 10.5% from 18 to 24, 23.5% from 25 to 44, 28.4% from 45 to 64, and 16.5% who were 65 years of age or older. The median age was 42 years. For every 100 females, there were 92.6 males. For every 100 females age 18 and over, there were 87.5 males.

The median income for a household in the city was $29,615, and the median income for a family was $32,500. Males had a median income of $26,250 versus $26,429 for females. The per capita income for the city was $14,927. About 20.3% of families and 19.1% of the population were below the poverty line, including 21.1% of those under the age of eighteen and 17.2% of those 65 or over.

== Education ==
Residents are part of the Forest City Community School District. It was a part of the Woden–Crystal Lake Community School District until July 1, 2013, when it consolidated into the Forest City district.
