= Hutchins, Iowa =

- Census-designated place
- Location within Iowa Location within the United States
- Coordinates: 43°05′16″N 93°53′12″W
- Country: United States
- State: Iowa
- County: Hancock

Area
  - Total: 0.30 sq mi (0.78 km^{2})
  - Land: 0.30 sq mi (0.78 km^{2})
  - Water: 0 sq mi (0.00 km^{2})
- Elevation: 1,198 ft (365 m)

Population (2020)
  - Total: 22
  - Density: 72.8/sq mi (28.12/km^{2})
- Time zone: UTC-6 (CST)
- ZIP code: 50423
- Area code: 641
- FIPS code: 19-37875
- GNIS feature ID: 2585480

Hutchins is an unincorporated community and census-designated place (CDP) in Hancock County, Iowa, United States. As of the 2020 census the population was 22.

== Demographics ==
Historical population
Census	Pop.	Note	%±
2010	28		—
2020	22		−21.4%
U.S. Decennial Census

=== 2020 census ===
As of the census of 2020, there were 22 people, 3 households, and 0 families residing in the community. The population density was 72.8 inhabitants per square mile (28.1/km^{2}). There were 11 housing units at an average density of 36.4 per square mile (14.1/km^{2}). The racial makeup of the community was 81.8% White, 4.5% Black or African American, 4.5% Native American, 0.0% Asian, 0.0% Pacific Islander, 4.5% from other races and 4.5% from two or more races. Hispanic or Latino persons of any race comprised 9.1% of the population.

Of the 3 households, 0.0% of which had children under the age of 18 living with them, 0.0% were married couples living together, 0.0% were cohabitating couples, 66.7% had a female householder with no spouse or partner present and 33.3% had a male householder with no spouse or partner present. 100.0% of all households were non-families. 100.0% of all households were made up of individuals, 66.7% had someone living alone who was 65 years old or older.

The median age in the community was 45.0 years. 18.2% of the residents were under the age of 20; 0.0% were between the ages of 20 and 24; 31.8% were from 25 and 44; 22.7% were from 45 and 64; and 27.3% were 65 years of age or older. The gender makeup of the community was 50.0% male and 50.0% female.

== History ==
Hutchins was platted in 1893. The population of the community was 56 in 1902, and 25 in 1925.
