= Woden–Crystal Lake Community School District =

Defunct school district in Iowa, United States

Woden–Crystal Lake Community School District (W-CL) was a school district headquartered in Crystal Lake, Iowa. It served Crystal Lake and Woden.

Most of the district was in Hancock County, while a section was in Winnebago County.

== History ==
Circa 1992 the Woden–Crystal Lake district began sharing administrative services and employees with the Forest City Community School District.

For much of its history, the Titonka Consolidated School District sent its students to the Woden–Crystal Lake–Titonka High School for senior high school, while Titonka operated the joint junior high school, and both districts had their respective elementary schools, with Woden–Crystal Lake's elementary being in Woden. As a result of the agreement, schools were branded "Woden–Crystal Lake–Titonka Community School District" even though the two districts remained legally separate. In 2011, Woden–Crystal Lake shifted its grade-sharing to the Forest City district, while Titonka switched its grade-sharing to the Algona district. Therefore, Woden–Crystal closed Woden–Crystal Lake–Titonka High School. As a result, preschool through first grade remained at the Crystal City school while other grade levels were sent to Forest City.

The leaderships of the Woden–Crystal Lake and Forest City districts prepared for an election which would merge the districts into one. 270 W-CL residents submitted a petition instead asking for the district to be dissolved and broken into pieces given to multiple surrounding districts. Using a petition asking for a consolidation, Area Education Agency 267 approved the vote, with a preliminary election date of September 11, 2012. On July 1, 2013, the Woden–Crystal Lake district consolidated into the Forest City district.
