= Ventura, Iowa =

- City
- Location of Ventura, Iowa
- Coordinates: 43°07′32″N 93°27′46″W
- Country: United States
- State: Iowa
- County: Cerro Gordo

Area
  - Total: 2.49 sq mi (6.46 km^{2})
  - Land: 1.78 sq mi (4.60 km^{2})
  - Water: 0.72 sq mi (1.86 km^{2})
- Elevation: 1,250 ft (380 m)

Population (2020)
  - Total: 711
  - Density: 400.3/sq mi (154.55/km^{2})
- Time zone: UTC-6 (Central (CST))
  - Summer (DST): UTC-5 (CDT)
- ZIP code: 50482
- Area code: 641
- FIPS code: 19-80580
- GNIS feature ID: 2397124
- Website: venturaiowa.com

Ventura is a city in Cerro Gordo County, Iowa, United States. The population was 711 at the time of the 2020 census. It is part of the Mason City Micropolitan Statistical Area. Ventura is located on the northeastern basin of Clear Lake, making it an area with many lakeside areas.

== Geography ==
According to the United States Census Bureau, the city has a total area of 2.43 square miles (6.29 km^{2}), of which 1.77 square miles (4.58 km^{2}) is land and 0.66 square miles (1.71 km^{2}) is water.

== Demographics ==
Historical populations
Year	Pop.	±%
1970	543	—
1980	614	+13.1%
1990	590	−3.9%
2000	670	+13.6%
2010	717	+7.0%
2020	711	−0.8%
Source:"U.S. Census website". United States Census Bureau. and Iowa Data Center; Source: U.S. Decennial Census

=== 2020 census ===
As of the census of 2020, there were 711 people, 325 households, and 226 families residing in the city. The population density was 400.3 inhabitants per square mile (154.5/km^{2}). There were 387 housing units at an average density of 217.9 per square mile (84.1/km^{2}). The racial makeup of the city was 95.6% White, 0.3% Black or African American, 0.0% Native American, 0.0% Asian, 0.1% Pacific Islander, 0.6% from other races and 3.4% from two or more races. Hispanic or Latino persons of any race comprised 2.3% of the population.

Of the 325 households, 21.8% of which had children under the age of 18 living with them, 60.6% were married couples living together, 5.5% were cohabitating couples, 21.2% had a female householder with no spouse or partner present and 12.6% had a male householder with no spouse or partner present. 30.5% of all households were non-families. 26.5% of all households were made up of individuals, 13.8% had someone living alone who was 65 years old or older.

The median age in the city was 51.6 years. 19.8% of the residents were under the age of 20; 2.7% were between the ages of 20 and 24; 20.1% were from 25 and 44; 31.9% were from 45 and 64; and 25.5% were 65 years of age or older. The gender makeup of the city was 49.9% male and 50.1% female.

=== 2010 census ===
As of the census of 2010, there were 717 people, 315 households, and 215 families living in the city. The population density was 405.1 inhabitants per square mile (156.4/km^{2}). There were 377 housing units at an average density of 213.0 per square mile (82.2/km^{2}). The racial makeup of the city was 98.3% White, 0.6% Asian, 0.4% from other races, and 0.7% from two or more races. Hispanic or Latino of any race were 1.3% of the population.

There were 315 households, of which 21.9% had children under the age of 18 living with them, 58.4% were married couples living together, 4.8% had a female householder with no husband present, 5.1% had a male householder with no wife present, and 31.7% were non-families. 24.4% of all households were made up of individuals, and 13.6% had someone living alone who was 65 years of age or older. The average household size was 2.28 and the average family size was 2.70.

The median age in the city was 48.3 years. 18.5% of residents were under the age of 18; 5.4% were between the ages of 18 and 24; 20.5% were from 25 to 44; 34.1% were from 45 to 64; and 21.5% were 65 years of age or older. The gender makeup of the city was 51.5% male and 48.5% female.

=== 2000 census ===
As of the census of 2000, there were 670 people, 277 households, and 195 families living in the city. The population density was 387.4 inhabitants per square mile (149.6/km^{2}). There were 319 housing units at an average density of 184.5 per square mile (71.2/km^{2}). The racial makeup of the city was 99.40% White and 0.60% Asian. Hispanic or Latino of any race were 0.30% of the population.

There were 277 households, out of which 32.1% had children under the age of 18 living with them, 61.0% were married couples living together, 6.9% had a female householder with no husband present, and 29.6% were non-families. 25.6% of all households were made up of individuals, and 11.6% had someone living alone who was 65 years of age or older. The average household size was 2.42 and the average family size was 2.93.

In the city, the population was spread out, with 24.2% under the age of 18, 7.0% from 18 to 24, 25.8% from 25 to 44, 25.1% from 45 to 64, and 17.9% who were 65 years of age or older. The median age was 41 years. For every 100 females, there were 100.6 males. For every 100 females age 18 and over, there were 94.6 males.

The median income for a household in the city was $41,875, and the median income for a family was $47,969. Males had a median income of $37,019 versus $21,983 for females. The per capita income for the city was $22,994. About 3.3% of families and 4.0% of the population were below the poverty line, including 3.9% of those under age 18 and 3.1% of those age 65 or over.

== Education ==
Ventura is a part of the Garner–Hayfield–Ventura Community School District. It was established on July 1, 2015, with the merger of the Garner–Hayfield Community School District and the Ventura Community School District.

== Local legend ==
Local legend suggests, though isn't confirmed, that a cryptid called the Mugwump lives in a marsh in Ventura, Iowa.
