= Kanawha, Iowa =

- City
- Location of Kanawha, Iowa
- Coordinates: 42°56′12″N 93°47′39″W
- Country: USA
- State: Iowa
- County: Hancock

Area
  - Total: 1.98 sq mi (5.14 km^{2})
  - Land: 1.98 sq mi (5.14 km^{2})
  - Water: 0 sq mi (0.00 km^{2})
- Elevation: 1,188 ft (362 m)

Population (2020)
  - Total: 658
  - Density: 331.8/sq mi (128.11/km^{2})
- Time zone: UTC-6 (Central (CST))
  - Summer (DST): UTC-5 (CDT)
- ZIP code: 50447
- Area code: 641
- FIPS code: 19-40260
- GNIS feature ID: 2395487
- Website: kanawhaiowa.com

Kanawha is a city in Hancock County, Iowa, United States. The population was 658 at the time of the 2020 census.

== History ==
Kanawha was platted in 1899. The newly constructed railroad had arrived from Belmond, Iowa. Businesses and some buildings moved from settlements three to four miles distant to establish in the new town on the railroad. Those settlements were Cuba, to the north, Magor, to the northwest, Mikesville, to the southwest, Aldrich, to the south (Drew, moved and renamed Bruce, was farther south), West Lake, to the east, and Bailey's Grove to the north east. Kanawha's founder, George Casper Call, petitioned Congressman J.P. Dolliver requesting a post office and proposing the name "Luzon". Luzon was rejected because it was thought to be too close to the name of an existing Iowa, Luzerne in Benton County. Faced with having to find another name, a railroad engineer and West Virginia native, suggested "Kanawha". The name met with approval.

== Geography ==
According to the United States Census Bureau, the city has a total area of 2.01 square miles (5.21 km^{2}), all land.

== Demographics ==
Historical populations
Year	Pop.	±%
1910	398	—
1920	659	+65.6%
1930	609	−7.6%
1940	767	+25.9%
1950	747	−2.6%
1960	735	−1.6%
1970	822	+11.8%
1980	756	−8.0%
1990	763	+0.9%
2000	739	−3.1%
2010	652	−11.8%
2020	658	+0.9%
Source:"U.S. Census website". United States Census Bureau. and Iowa Data Center; Source: U.S. Decennial Census

=== 2020 census ===
As of the census of 2020, there were 658 people, 279 households, and 177 families residing in the city. The population density was 331.8 inhabitants per square mile (128.1/km^{2}). There were 335 housing units at an average density of 168.9 per square mile (65.2/km^{2}). The racial makeup of the city was 85.1% White, 0.3% Black or African American, 1.4% Native American, 0.5% Asian, 0.0% Pacific Islander, 7.8% from other races and 5.0% from two or more races. Hispanic or Latino persons of any race comprised 14.0% of the population.

Of the 279 households, 26.5% of which had children under the age of 18 living with them, 45.5% were married couples living together, 7.9% were cohabitating couples, 28.7% had a female householder with no spouse or partner present and 17.9% had a male householder with no spouse or partner present. 36.6% of all households were non-families. 31.5% of all households were made up of individuals, 18.6% had someone living alone who was 65 years old or older.

The median age in the city was 42.1 years. 25.7% of the residents were under the age of 20; 5.9% were between the ages of 20 and 24; 21.1% were from 25 and 44; 22.2% were from 45 and 64; and 25.1% were 65 years of age or older. The gender makeup of the city was 49.8% male and 50.2% female.

=== 2010 census ===
As of the census of 2010, there were 652 people, 291 households, and 167 families residing in the city. The population density was 324.4 inhabitants per square mile (125.3/km^{2}). There were 348 housing units at an average density of 173.1 per square mile (66.8/km^{2}). The racial makeup of the city was 96.8% White, 0.8% African American, 0.6% Native American, 0.3% Asian, 0.8% from other races, and 0.8% from two or more races. Hispanic or Latino of any race were 5.2% of the population.

There were 291 households, of which 24.7% had children under the age of 18 living with them, 46.0% were married couples living together, 6.9% had a female householder with no husband present, 4.5% had a male householder with no wife present, and 42.6% were non-families. 37.8% of all households were made up of individuals, and 23.4% had someone living alone who was 65 years of age or older. The average household size was 2.16 and the average family size was 2.87.

The median age in the city was 47 years. 21.6% of residents were under the age of 18; 6% were between the ages of 18 and 24; 19.4% were from 25 to 44; 24.5% were from 45 to 64; and 28.5% were 65 years of age or older. The gender makeup of the city was 47.9% male and 52.1% female.

=== 2000 census ===
As of the census of 2000, there were 739 people, 309 households, and 194 families residing in the city. The population density was 368.3 inhabitants per square mile (142.2/km^{2}). There were 338 housing units at an average density of 168.4 per square mile (65.0/km^{2}). The racial makeup of the city was 97.70% White, 0.68% Native American, 0.68% from other races, and 0.95% from two or more races. Hispanic or Latino of any race were 2.30% of the population.

There were 309 households, out of which 24.6% had children under the age of 18 living with them, 55.0% were married couples living together, 5.2% had a female householder with no husband present, and 37.2% were non-families. 34.6% of all households were made up of individuals, and 22.0% had someone living alone who was 65 years of age or older. The average household size was 2.26 and the average family size was 2.90.

In the city, the population was spread out, with 22.3% under the age of 18, 5.7% from 18 to 24, 22.2% from 25 to 44, 19.2% from 45 to 64, and 30.6% who were 65 years of age or older. The median age was 45 years. For every 100 females, there were 83.8 males. For every 100 females age 18 and over, there were 80.5 males.

The median income for a household in the city was $36,250, and the median income for a family was $42,031. Males had a median income of $27,273 versus $20,288 for females. The per capita income for the city was $18,429. About 2.5% of families and 5.1% of the population were below the poverty line, including 4.0% of those under age 18 and 2.2% of those age 65 or over.

== Education ==
Kindergarten through 12th grade students from Kanawha attend the West Hancock Community School District. The district formed on July 1, 1994, with the merger of the Britt and Kanawha districts.

Kanawha is also home to Kanawha Christian School which serves kindergarten through 8th grade students in a 35-mile radius.
