= Woden, Iowa =

- City
- Location of Woden, Iowa
- Coordinates: 43°13′51″N 93°54′41″W
- Country: USA
- State: Iowa
- County: Hancock

Area
  - Total: 0.49 sq mi (1.28 km^{2})
  - Land: 0.49 sq mi (1.28 km^{2})
  - Water: 0 sq mi (0.00 km^{2})
- Elevation: 1,230 ft (370 m)

Population (2020)
  - Total: 188
  - Density: 381.5/sq mi (147.29/km^{2})
- Time zone: UTC-6 (Central (CST))
  - Summer (DST): UTC-5 (CDT)
- ZIP code: 50484
- Area code: 641
- FIPS code: 19-86700
- GNIS feature ID: 2397357
- Website: wodenia.com

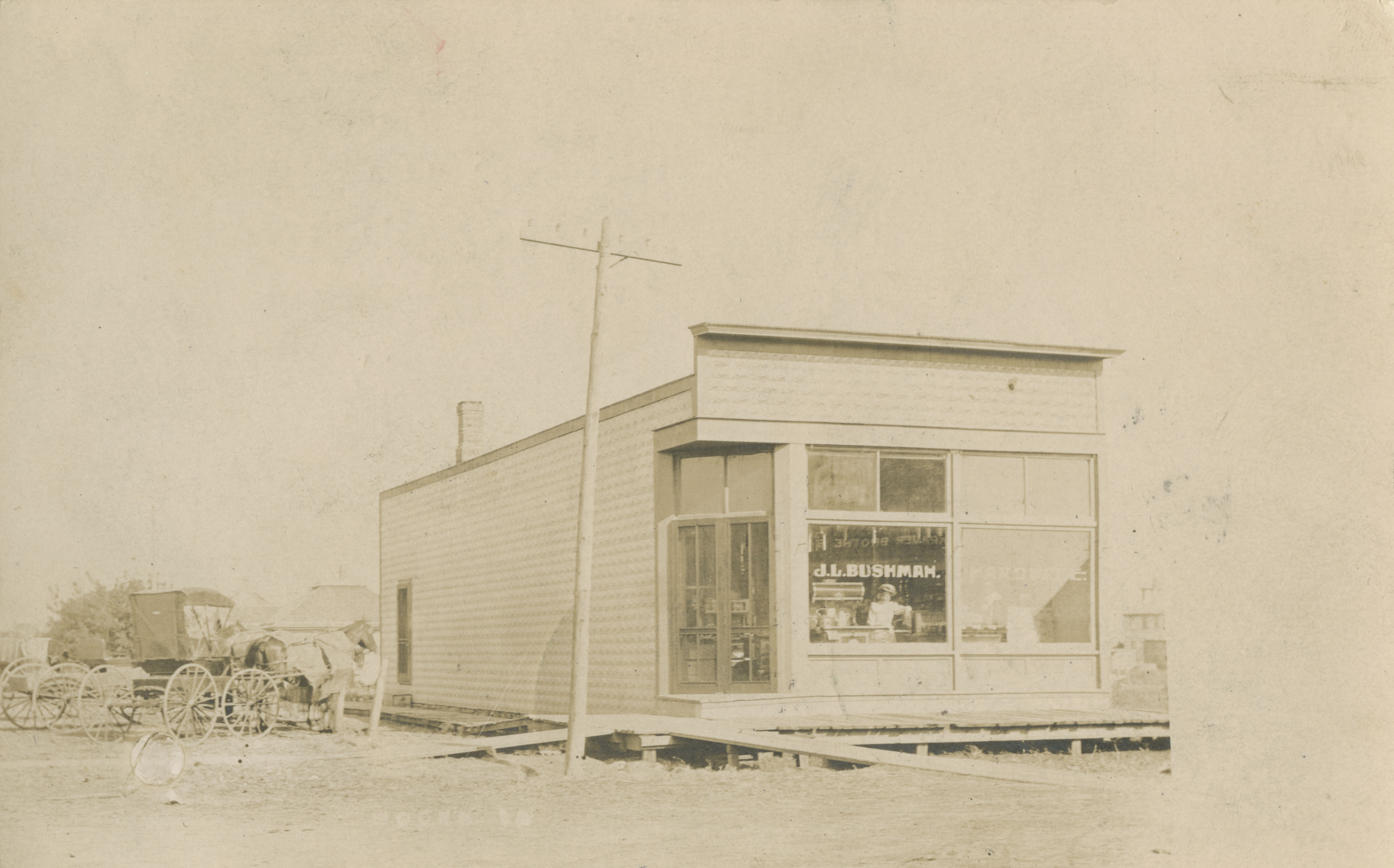
Main Street, Woden, Iowa

Woden is a city in Hancock County, Iowa, United States. The population was 188 at the time of the 2020 census.

== History ==
Woden was platted in 1898, and was incorporated as a city in 1904.

== Geography ==
According to the United States Census Bureau, the city has a total area of 0.42 square miles (1.09 km^{2}), all land.

== Demographics ==
Historical populations
Year	Pop.	±%
1910	162	—
1920	188	+16.0%
1930	258	+37.2%
1940	305	+18.2%
1950	272	−10.8%
1960	283	+4.0%
1970	265	−6.4%
1980	287	+8.3%
1990	259	−9.8%
2000	243	−6.2%
2010	229	−5.8%
2020	188	−17.9%
Source:"U.S. Census website". United States Census Bureau. and Iowa Data Center; Source: U.S. Decennial Census

=== 2020 census ===
As of the 2020 Census, the total population was 188 people. The population density was 447.6 people per square mile, spread over 0.42 miles. Of those 188 people, the median age was 46 years old, with 22.6% of the town's population under the age of 18, 58.2% between the ages of 18 and 64, and 19.2% of the population over the age of 65. There were a total of 79 households, with an average of 2.37 people per household.

56% of the town's population was female, with 44% of the population male. The racial makeup of the town was 88.29% White, 1% Native American or Alaskan Native, 6.9% mixed race, and 9.5% Hispanic.

The average income per capita of Woden was $18,646, which is lower than the state average, and the median household income was $44,375, 75% of that of the rest of the state. 18.6% of the town’s population lives under the poverty line, which is far greater than the rest of the state.

58.3% of the population of the town is identified as currently married.

88.9% of the Woden population has received a high school degree, which is 3.6 percentage points lower than the rest of the state. Woden also has a lower-than-average percentage of the population having received college degrees, with only 11.1% of the town's population has received a bachelor’s degree compared to the state average of 30.5%.

17.5% of the town's population were veterans.

=== 2010 census ===
As of the census of 2010, there were 229 people, 106 households, and 62 families residing in the city. The population density was 545.2 inhabitants per square mile (210.5/km^{2}). There were 122 housing units at an average density of 290.5 per square mile (112.2/km^{2}). The racial makeup of the city was 96.1% White, 0.4% Native American, 2.6% from other races, and 0.9% from two or more races. Hispanic or Latino of any race were 5.2% of the population.

There were 106 households, of which 27.4% had children under the age of 18 living with them, 44.3% were married couples living together, 8.5% had a female householder with no husband present, 5.7% had a male householder with no wife present, and 41.5% were non-families. 36.8% of all households were made up of individuals, and 22.6% had someone living alone who was 65 years of age or older. The average household size was 2.16 and the average family size was 2.76.

The median age in the city was 40.3 years. 23.1% of residents were under the age of 18; 8.3% were between the ages of 18 and 24; 24.1% were from 25 to 44; 18.8% were from 45 to 64; and 25.8% were 65 years of age or older. The gender makeup of the city was 50.2% male and 49.8% female.

=== 2000 census ===
As of the census of 2000, there were 243 people, 115 households, and 69 families residing in the city. The population density was 565.8 inhabitants per square mile (218.5/km^{2}). There were 125 housing units at an average density of 291.1 per square mile (112.4/km^{2}). The racial makeup of the city was 99.59% White and 0.41% Native American. Hispanic or Latino of any race were 0.82% of the population.

There were 115 households, out of which 21.7% had children under the age of 18 living with them, 46.1% were married couples living together, 7.8% had a female householder with no husband present, and 40.0% were non-families. 39.1% of all households were made up of individuals, and 23.5% had someone living alone who was 65 years of age or older. The average household size was 2.11 and the average family size was 2.77.

In the city, the population was spread out, with 21.4% under the age of 18, 4.5% from 18 to 24, 28.8% from 25 to 44, 18.9% from 45 to 64, and 26.3% who were 65 years of age or older. The median age was 40 years. For every 100 females, there were 86.9 males. For every 100 females age 18 and over, there were 91.0 males.

The median income for a household in the city was $27,083, and the median income for a family was $39,250. Males had a median income of $29,643 versus $21,000 for females. The per capita income for the city was $17,544. About 14.1% of families and 19.8% of the population were below the poverty line, including 54.8% of those under the age of eighteen and 7.0% of those 65 or over.

== Education ==
Residents are part of the Forest City Community School District. It was a part of the Woden–Crystal Lake Community School District until July 1, 2013, when it consolidated into the Forest City district.

== Notable people ==
- Betty Grundberg, Iowa state legislator
- David Eden Lane, white supremacist and convicted terrorist
