= Klemme Community School District =

Former school district in Iowa

Coordinates: 43.0°N 93.6°W

Klemme Community School District was a school district in the town of Klemme, Iowa. The school was built in 1939 using money from a bond issue and the Public Works Administration. It expanded in 1957, with the addition of an elementary school.

The district merged into the Belmond–Klemme Community School District on July 1, 1994. The Klemme school building closed after the district consolidation.
