= Forest City Community School District =

Public school district in Forest City, Iowa, United States

Coordinates: 43.262605°N 93.638118°W

Location
- Forest City, Iowa Hancock, Winnebago, Worth and Cerro Gordo counties United States
- Coordinates: 43.262605, -93.638118

District information
- Type: Local school district
- Grades: K–12
- Superintendent: Darwin Lehmann
- Schools: 3
- Budget: $17,305,000 (2020-21)
- NCES District ID: 1931680

Students and staff
- Students: 1141 (2022-23)
- Teachers: 89.61 FTE
- Staff: 80.83 FTE
- Student–teacher ratio: 12.73
- Athletic conference: Top of Iowa
- District mascot: Indians
- Colors: Red and White

Other information
- Website: www.forestcity.k12.ia.us

Forest City Community School District is a rural public school district headquartered in Forest City, Iowa.

The district is located in sections of Hancock, Winnebago, Worth and Cerro Gordo counties. It serves Forest City, Crystal Lake, Fertile, Leland, Woden, and the surrounding rural areas.

On July 1, 2013, the Woden–Crystal Lake Community School District consolidated into the Forest City district.

== Schools ==
The district operates three schools, all in Forest City:

- Forest City Elementary School
- Forest City Middle School
- Forest City High School

=== Forest City High School ===
==== Athletics ====
The Indians participate in the Top of Iowa Conference in the following sports:

- Football
- Cross Country
- Volleyball
- Basketball
  - Boys' 1976 Class 2A State Champions
- Bowling
- Wrestling
- Golf
- Track and Field
- Baseball
  - 1984 Class 3A State Champions
- Softball

== See also ==
- List of school districts in Iowa
- List of high schools in Iowa
