= Klemme, Iowa =

- City
- Location of Klemme, Iowa
- Coordinates: 43°0′35″N 93°36′05″W
- Country: USA
- State: Iowa
- County: Hancock

Area
  - Total: 0.50 sq mi (1.30 km^{2})
  - Land: 0.50 sq mi (1.30 km^{2})
  - Water: 0 sq mi (0.00 km^{2})
- Elevation: 1,224 ft (373 m)

Population (2020)
  - Total: 441
  - Density: 881.9/sq mi (340.51/km^{2})
- Time zone: UTC-6 (Central (CST))
  - Summer (DST): UTC-5 (CDT)
- ZIP code: 50449
- Area code: 641
- FIPS code: 19-41655
- GNIS feature ID: 2395553

Klemme is a city in Hancock County, Iowa, United States. The population was 441 at the time of the 2020 census.

== History ==
The city is named for Harmon J. Klemme, the original land owner. Klemme was established in 1889, and incorporated in 1899.

Harmon Klemme's Klemme home is preserved as the Klemme Homestead Museum. His home in Belmond, Iowa, where he lived for many years, is the Klemme House Bed and Breakfast.

A large wind farm is located southwest of Klemme.

== Geography ==
Klemme is located near the East Branch Iowa River.

According to the United States Census Bureau, the city has a total area of 0.51 square miles (1.32 km^{2}), all land.

== Demographics ==
Historical populations
Year	Pop.	±%
1900	262	—
1910	306	+16.8%
1920	468	+52.9%
1930	463	−1.1%
1940	528	+14.0%
1950	555	+5.1%
1960	615	+10.8%
1970	554	−9.9%
1980	620	+11.9%
1990	587	−5.3%
2000	593	+1.0%
2010	507	−14.5%
2020	441	−13.0%
Source:"U.S. Census website". United States Census Bureau. and Iowa Data Center; Source: U.S. Decennial Census

=== 2020 census ===
As of the census of 2020, there were 441 people, 207 households, and 125 families residing in the city. The population density was 881.9 inhabitants per square mile (340.5/km^{2}). There were 238 housing units at an average density of 476.0 per square mile (183.8/km^{2}). The racial makeup of the city was 90.7% White, 0.2% Black or African American, 0.9% Native American, 0.0% Asian, 0.2% Pacific Islander, 3.4% from other races and 4.5% from two or more races. Hispanic or Latino persons of any race comprised 7.0% of the population.

Of the 207 households, 32.4% of which had children under the age of 18 living with them, 46.9% were married couples living together, 10.6% were cohabitating couples, 20.8% had a female householder with no spouse or partner present and 21.7% had a male householder with no spouse or partner present. 39.6% of all households were non-families. 31.9% of all households were made up of individuals, 13.5% had someone living alone who was 65 years old or older.

The median age in the city was 40.9 years. 24.3% of the residents were under the age of 20; 6.1% were between the ages of 20 and 24; 23.4% were from 25 and 44; 26.1% were from 45 and 64; and 20.2% were 65 years of age or older. The gender makeup of the city was 51.7% male and 48.3% female.

=== 2010 census ===
As of the census of 2010, there were 507 people, 219 households, and 132 families residing in the city. The population density was 994.1 inhabitants per square mile (383.8/km^{2}). There were 252 housing units at an average density of 494.1 per square mile (190.8/km^{2}). The racial makeup of the city was 98.6% White, 0.4% African American, 0.2% Asian, and 0.8% from two or more races. Hispanic or Latino of any race were 0.4% of the population.

There were 219 households, of which 29.7% had children under the age of 18 living with them, 42.9% were married couples living together, 11.0% had a female householder with no husband present, 6.4% had a male householder with no wife present, and 39.7% were non-families. 32.9% of all households were made up of individuals, and 15.1% had someone living alone who was 65 years of age or older. The average household size was 2.32 and the average family size was 2.87.

The median age in the city was 39.6 years. 26.2% of residents were under the age of 18; 6.3% were between the ages of 18 and 24; 23.6% were from 25 to 44; 27% were from 45 to 64; and 16.8% were 65 years of age or older. The gender makeup of the city was 49.1% male and 50.9% female.

=== 2000 census ===
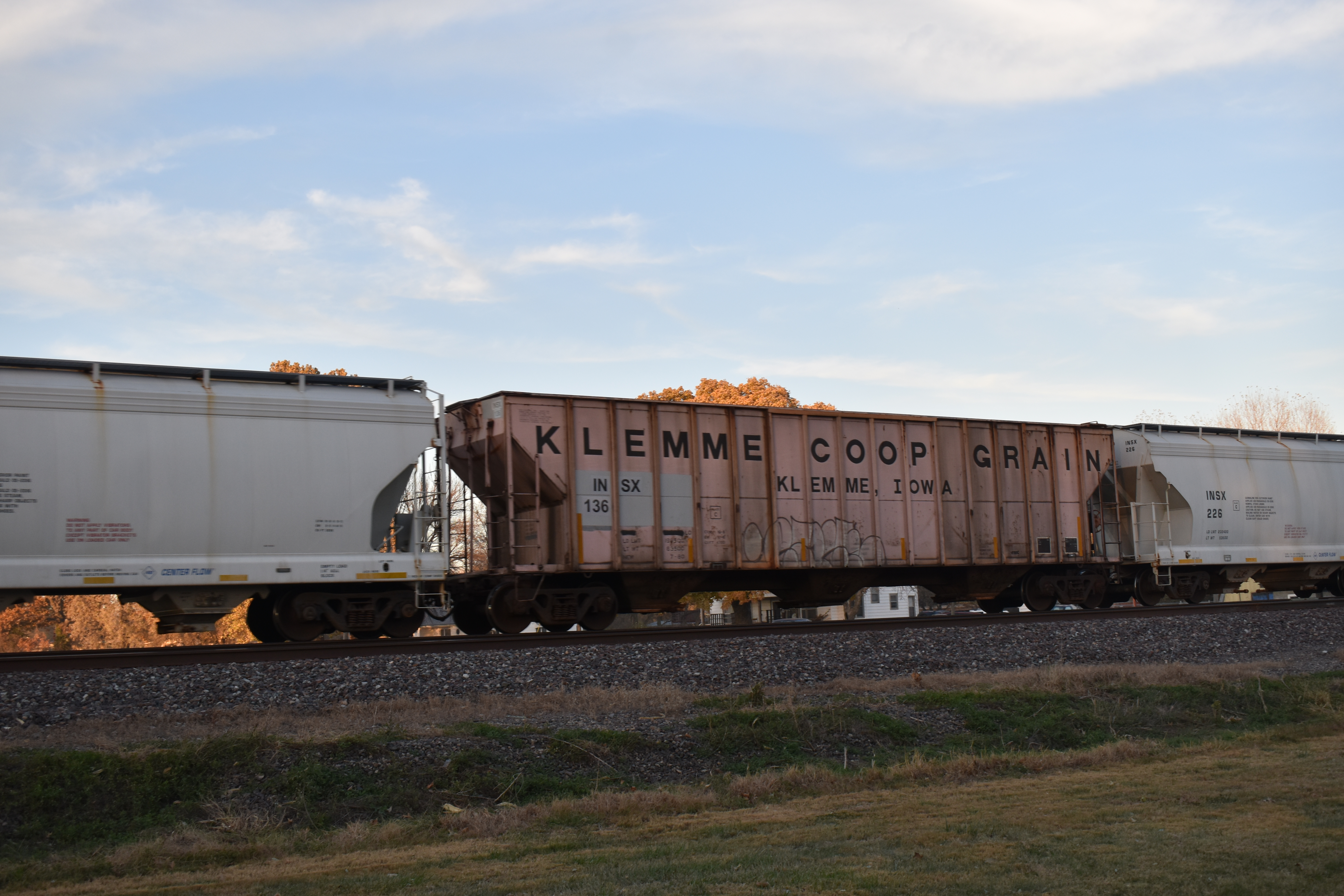
INSX 136, a hopper car formerly owned by the Klemme Co-Op Grain Company.

As of the census of 2000, there were 593 people, 246 households, and 170 families residing in the city. The population density was 1,161.0 inhabitants per square mile (448.3/km^{2}). There were 268 housing units at an average density of 524.7 per square mile (202.6/km^{2}). The racial makeup of the city was 98.82% White, 0.17% Asian, 1.01% from other races. Hispanic or Latino of any race were 3.04% of the population.

There were 246 households, out of which 27.2% had children under the age of 18 living with them, 59.8% were married couples living together, 5.7% had a female householder with no husband present, and 30.5% were non-families. 25.6% of all households were made up of individuals, and 14.2% had someone living alone who was 65 years of age or older. The average household size was 2.41 and the average family size was 2.90.

25.5% are under the age of 18, 7.6% from 18 to 24, 27.2% from 25 to 44, 19.1% from 45 to 64, and 20.7% who were 65 years of age or older. The median age was 36 years. For every 100 females, there were 94.4 males. For every 100 females age 18 and over, there were 90.5 males.

The median income for a household in the city was $32,614, and the median income for a family was $36,625. Males had a median income of $27,426 versus $18,281 for females. The per capita income for the city was $15,581. About 4.3% of families and 5.0% of the population were below the poverty line, including 1.9% of those under age 18 and 10.9% of those age 65 or over.

== Education ==
Belmond–Klemme Community School District serves the community.

Klemme was long the home of the Klemme Community School District, which had a 1939 Public Works Administration building with a 1957 expansion for elementary grades. Klemme High's last graduating class was the Class of 1990. The Belmond-Klemme district formed on July 1, 1994, as the Klemme district merged with the Belmond district. The school building closed after the district consolidation. Luverne Schmidt and his wife bought the school building in 2000, replaced the roof and for a period operated a restaurant there.

== Notable people ==
- Jane Greimann (1942–2006), member of the Iowa House of Representatives
- Larry R. Johnson (1844–1998), meteorologist and Air Force officer
