= Hancock County Courthouse (Iowa) =

- U.S. National Register of Historic Places
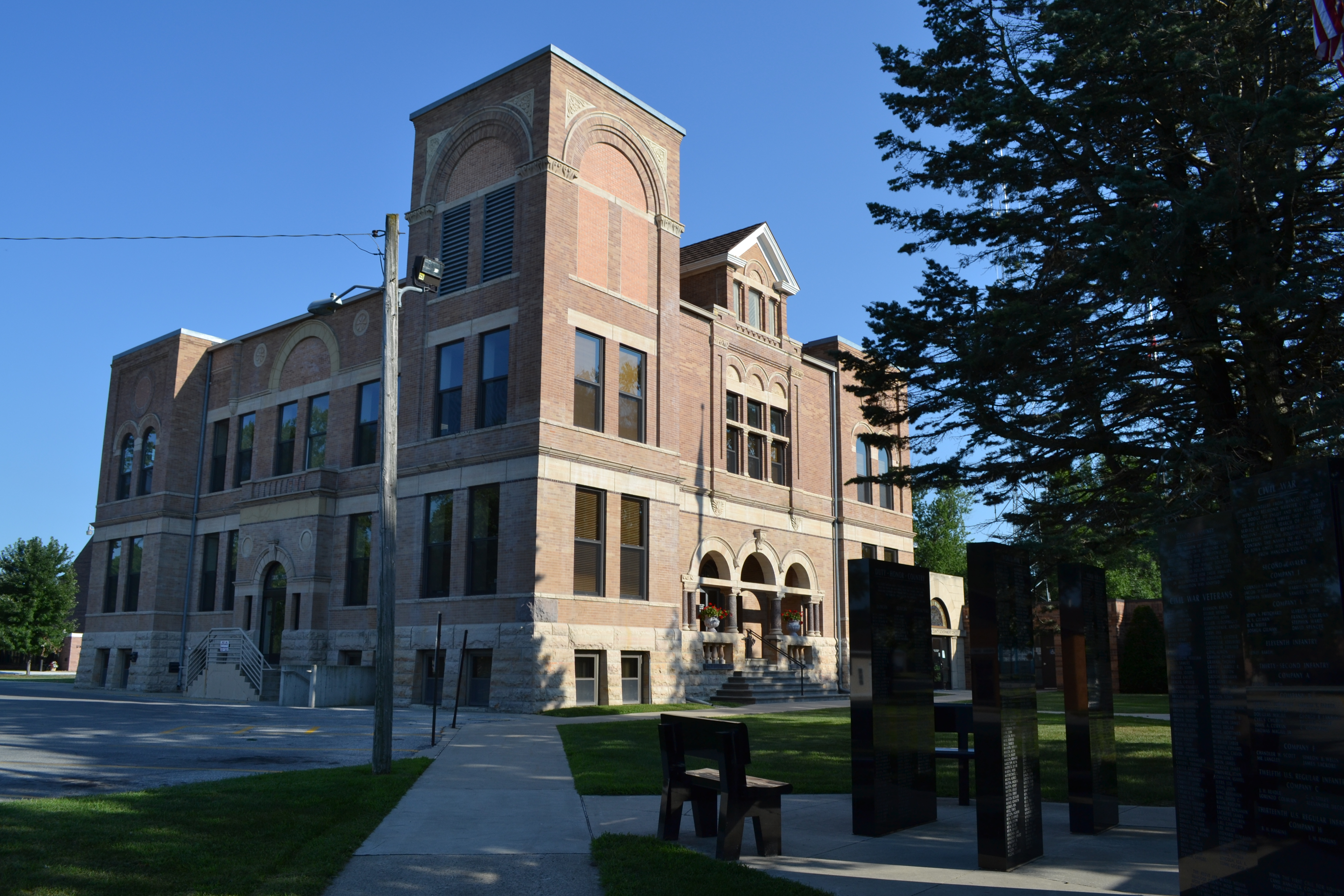
- Hancock County Courthouse looking southeast

- Location within Iowa Location within the United States
- Location: 855 State Street; Garner, Iowa
- Coordinates: 43°5′47″N 93°36′4″W
- Area: less than one acre
- Built: 1899
- Built by: Gross Construction
- Architect: F.W. Kinney
- MPS: County Courthouses in Iowa TR
- NRHP reference No.: 81000240
- Added to NRHP: July 2, 1981

The Hancock County Courthouse is located in Garner, Iowa, United States. It was listed on the National Register of Historic Places in 1981 as a part of the County Courthouses in Iowa Thematic Resource. The courthouse is the second structure to house court functions and county administration.

== History ==
Truman Seymor from New York donated the land for the first county seat in Hancock County. The place was named Concord and officials constructed two small buildings on the site in 1865 for $2,000. Within two years the buildings became too small and county supervisors erected a new courthouse for $10,000 in 1868. The city of Garner annexed Concord in the 1890s while residents from Britt attempted to have the county seat relocated. Garner, however, retained the designation after a group of businessmen purchased a new site, built a courthouse and donated it to the county. Citizens on the east side of the county contributed $25,000 towards the new building designed by F.W. Kinney. Gross Construction completed the structure in 1899. It is two-stories tall, faced with tan brick, and it features limestone and granite accents. The structure rests on an exposed ground level covered in rusticated stone. The building has lost several elements that gave it architectural interest. They include the cupola, tower, roof balustrade, and upper floor windows have been boarded up.

The structure was expanded in 1977 when a separate facility to house the sheriff's offices and jail were constructed south of the courthouse. A 1999 expansion connected this to the main structure. The significance of the courthouse is derived from its association with county government, and the political power and prestige of Garner as the county seat.
