= Miller, Iowa =

- Census-designated place
- Location within Iowa Location within the United States
- Coordinates: 43°11′11″N 93°36′28″W
- Country: United States
- State: Iowa
- County: Hancock

Area
  - Total: 2.07 sq mi (5.35 km^{2})
  - Land: 2.07 sq mi (5.35 km^{2})
  - Water: 0 sq mi (0.00 km^{2})
- Elevation: 1,214 ft (370 m)

Population (2020)
  - Total: 50
  - Density: 24.2/sq mi (9.35/km^{2})
- Time zone: UTC-6 (CST)
- ZIP code: 50438
- Area code: 641
- FIPS code: 19-52140
- GNIS feature ID: 2585482

Miller is an unincorporated community and census-designated place (CDP) in Hancock County, Iowa, United States. As of the 2020 census, the population was 50.

== History ==
Miller was platted in 1895. The population of the community was just 10 in 1902, but had increased to 165 by 1925.

== Demographics ==
Historical population
| Census | Pop. | Note | %± |
|---|---|---|---|
| 2010 | 60 | | — |
| 2020 | 50 | | −16.7% |
U.S. Decennial Census

=== 2020 census ===
As of the census of 2020, there were 50 people, 16 households, and 10 families residing in the community. The population density was 24.2 inhabitants per square mile (9.3/km^{2}). There were 26 housing units at an average density of 12.6 per square mile (4.9/km^{2}). The racial makeup of the community was 88.0% White, 0.0% Black or African American, 0.0% Native American, 0.0% Asian, 0.0% Pacific Islander, 0.0% from other races and 12.0% from two or more races. Hispanic or Latino persons of any race comprised 8.0% of the population.

Of the 16 households, 12.5% of which had children under the age of 18 living with them, 62.5% were married couples living together, 0.0% were cohabitating couples, 6.2% had a female householder with no spouse or partner present and 31.2% had a male householder with no spouse or partner present. 37.5% of all households were non-families. 37.5% of all households were made up of individuals, 12.5% had someone living alone who was 65 years old or older.

The median age in the community was 46.5 years. 28.0% of the residents were under the age of 20; 0.0% were between the ages of 20 and 24; 20.0% were from 25 and 44; 36.0% were from 45 and 64; and 16.0% were 65 years of age or older. The gender makeup of the community was 14.0% male and 86.0% female.

== Education ==
Miller is a part of the Garner–Hayfield–Ventura Community School District. It was previously in the Garner–Hayfield Community School District, which merged into the current GHV district on July 1, 2015.
