= Clear Lake Township, Cerro Gordo County, Iowa =

Township in Iowa, US

Clear Lake Township, Cerro Gordo County
- Township
- Coordinates: 43°07′21″N 093°26′45″W
- Country: United States
- State: Iowa
- County: Cerro Gordo

Area
  - Total: 13.03 sq mi (33.74 km^{2})
  - Land: 10.43 sq mi (27.02 km^{2})
  - Water: 2.59 sq mi (6.72 km^{2})
- Elevation: 1,227 ft (374 m)

Population (2000)
  - Total: 8,161
  - Density: 780/sq mi (302/km^{2})
- FIPS code: 19-90720
- GNIS feature ID: 0467619

Clear Lake Township is one of sixteen townships in Cerro Gordo County, Iowa, United States. As of the 2000 census, its population was 8,161.

== Geography ==
Clear Lake Township covers an area of 13.03 square miles (33.7 km^{2}) and contains one incorporated settlement, Ventura. The city of Clear Lake borders it to the east.
