= Union Township, Cerro Gordo County, Iowa =

Township in Iowa, US

Union Township, Cerro Gordo County
- Township
- Coordinates: 43°02′45″N 093°26′52″W
- Country: United States
- State: Iowa
- County: Cerro Gordo

Area
  - Total: 36.54 sq mi (94.64 km^{2})
  - Land: 36.52 sq mi (94.59 km^{2})
  - Water: 0.019 sq mi (0.05 km^{2})
- Elevation: 1,286 ft (392 m)

Population (2000)
  - Total: 185
  - Density: 5.2/sq mi (2/km^{2})
- FIPS code: 19-94188
- GNIS feature ID: 0468814

Union Township is one of sixteen townships in Cerro Gordo County, Iowa, United States. At the 2000 census, its population was 185.

== Geography ==
Union Township covers an area of 36.54 square miles (94.6 km^{2}) and contains no incorporated settlements.
