= Garner–Hayfield–Ventura Community School District =

Public school district in Garner, Iowa, United States

Coordinates: 43.089364°N 93.608647°W

Garner–Hayfield–Ventura (G-H-V) Community School District

Location
- Garner, Iowa Hancock County and Cerro Gordo County United States
- Coordinates: 43.089364, -93.608647

District information
- Type: Local school district
- Grades: K–12
- Established: 2015
- Superintendent: Ken Kasper
- Schools: 3
- Budget: $15,861,000 (2020-21)
- NCES District ID: 1912330

Students and staff
- Students: 980 (2022-23)
- Teachers: 61.96 FTE
- Staff: 56.33 FTE
- Student–teacher ratio: 15.82
- Athletic conference: Top of Iowa
- District mascot: Cardinals
- Colors: Red and Black

Other information
- Website: www.garner.k12.ia.us

Garner–Hayfield–Ventura Community School District is a rural public school district headquartered in Garner, Iowa. In addition to the cities of Garner and Ventura, it also serves the unincorporated areas of Duncan, Hayfield, and Miller. It also includes a small portion of Clear Lake. The district is located in Hancock and Cerro Gordo counties.

== History ==
It was established on July 1, 2015, with the merger of the Garner–Hayfield Community School District and the Ventura Community School District. The election to determine whether the districts would merge was held on September 9, 2014, with 602–22 in Garner–Hayfield and 351–51 counts in Ventura favoring the merger. Approval required each district to have over half of its constituents to vote in favor. The two districts previously had a whole grade-sharing arrangement, in which students from one district would attend another district's schools, beginning in 2012, and prior to that time the two districts shared specialized classes.

As a result of the merger, an interim board was to be established, with the number of board members depending on the population ratio of the territories of the previous districts, resulting in four members from Garner–Hayfield and two members from Ventura.

== Schools ==
- Garner–Hayfield–Ventura High School (Garner)
  - It was established from the former Garner–Hayfield High School in 2012 after grade-sharing began. 100 of its students that year came from the Ventura school district.
- Garner–Hayfield–Ventura Middle School (Ventura)
- Garner–Hayfield–Ventura Elementary School (Garner)
- GHV Education Center/Lakeside Alternative Program (Ventura)

=== Garner–Hayfield–Ventura High School ===
==== Athletics ====
The Cardinals participate in the North Central Conference - Pride Division in the following sports:

- Football
  - 1991 Class 2A State Champions
- Cross Country
  - Boys' 2015 Class 2A State Champions
- Volleyball
- Basketball
- Wrestling
- Golf
- Track and Field
- Baseball
- Softball

== See also ==
- List of school districts in Iowa
- List of high schools in Iowa
