= Belmond–Klemme Community School District =

Public school district in Belmond, Iowa, United States

Coordinates: 42.849200°N 93.604195°W

Address
- 303 E. Main Street Hancock, Wright, and Franklin counties Belmond, Wright, Iowa, 50421; United States
- Coordinates: 42.8492, -93.6042

District information
- Type: Local school district
- Grades: K–12
- Established: 1994
- Interim Superintendent: Chris Bergman (2023-2024)
- Schools: 3
- Budget: $13,192,000 (2020-21)
- NCES District ID: 1904680

Students and staff
- Students: 697 (2022-2023)
- Teachers: 56.22 FTE
- Staff: 66.40 FTE
- Student–teacher ratio: 12.40
- Athletic conference: Top of Iowa
- District mascot: Broncos
- Colors: Navy and Kelly

Other information
- Superintendent: Jenn Peter (Starts 2024)
- Website: www.bkcsd.org

Belmond–Klemme Community School District (BKCSD) is a rural public school district headquartered in on Main street Belmond, Iowa. It operates Belmond–Klemme Junior Senior High School, Belmond-Klemme alternative school and Richard O. Jacobson Elementary School.

It is mostly in Hancock and Wright counties, with a small portion in Franklin County. The district serves Belmond, Klemme, Goodell, and Rowan.

== History ==
The district formed on July 1, 1994, with the merger of the Belmond and Klemme districts. The Klemme school building was closed and purchased by a third party in 2000.

The district previously had two elementary school buildings: Ramsay Elementary School and Parker Elementary School. The district drew up plans for a new unified elementary school building along with other improvements. In October 2004 the district began attempting to have a bond for school reconstruction passed, but the bond efforts failed the first four times. The fifth attempt, for $6.27 million, was presented in September 2006. The bond required at least 60% of the voters to approve. The vote succeeded on a 1286-801 basis, with 61.62% approving. In September 2006 the district passed a bond referendum to build a new preschool - 6th grade elementary building (Richard O. Jacobson Elementary) just north of the existing 7–12 Jr./Sr. High. The district has already completed the phase of building new baseball/softball fields; additionally the Jr./Sr. High just completed a renovation in August 2013 allowing for increased security measures and geothermal heating and cooling (similar to the Jacobson Elementary). The district is also adding handicapped accessibility to the baseball and softball fields and adding playground handicapped accessibility equipment.

In 2010, Belmond–Klemme's Don Dye (high school English) won the top teacher award from Live with Regis and Kelly.

B-K has shown growth in student counts during the 2010–2014 academic years. Currently over 800 students are served in grades K–12.

== Schools ==
The district operates three schools, all in Belmond:

- Richard O. Jacobson Elementary School
- Belmond–Klemme Alternative School
- Belmond–Klemme Community Jr.-Sr. High School

=== Belmond–Klemme Community Jr.-Sr. High School ===
==== Extracurricular Activities ====
Belmond Klemme Community School District is in the top of Iowa Conference.

Athletics

- Football
- Cross Country
- Volleyball
- Wrestling
- Basketball
- Golf
- Track and Field
- Baseball
- Softball
- Trap shooting
- Soccer

Non Athletics

- Esports
- Speech
- Fine arts

== See also ==
- List of school districts in Iowa
- List of high schools in Iowa
