= Ventura Community School District =

Defunct school district in Iowa, United States

Ventura Community School District (VCSD) was a school district headquartered in Ventura, Iowa.

The district served portions of Cerro Gordo and Hancock counties. It covered a portion of Clear Lake.

== History ==
School No. 3 was established in unincorporated Cerro Gordo County in 1870, but was later moved to Ventura after a successful but controversial referendum. The permanent Ventura Consolidated School was built in 1918; consolidation of the school districts meant that more students were assigned to the school. A Works Progress Administration (WPA) limestone gymnasium was built after the district paid for its construction in 1937; it was built beginning on June 20, 1939, with completion on July 27, 1940. The existing school was renamed as the Ventura Community School on July 1, 1954, and it received a north-end addition in 1957. A new elementary school was built after a $240,000 bond referendum passed on April 4, 1956, and it was dedicated on September 30, 1957.

The Ventura and Clear Lake districts began having joint specialty high school classes in fall 1963.

For a period the district shared specialized classes with the Garner–Hayfield Community School District. Beginning in 2012 the two districts began a whole grade-sharing program in which students from one district attended school in the other district, with high school students at Garner and with middle school students at Ventura.

The election to determine whether the districts would merge was held on September 9, 2014, with 602–22 in Garner–Hayfield and 351–51 counts in Ventura favoring the merger. Approval required each district to have over half of its constituents to vote in favor. They merged into the new Garner–Hayfield–Ventura Community School District on July 1, 2015.

== Schools ==
It previously operated Ventura Elementary and Ventura Jr.-Sr. High School.
