= Garner–Hayfield Community School District =

Former school district in Iowa

Garner–Hayfield Community School District was a school district headquartered in Garner, Iowa; circa 1998 it was the second largest employer in that city. In addition it served the unincorporated areas of Duncan, Hayfield, and Miller. Circa 1998 it had 950 students.

For a period the district shared specialized classes with the Ventura Community School District. Beginning in 2012, the two districts began a whole grade-sharing program in which students from one district attended school in the other district, with high school students at Garner and with middle school students at Ventura.

The election to determine whether the districts would merge was held on September 9, 2014, with 602–22 in Garner–Hayfield and 351–51 counts in Ventura favoring the merger. Approval required each district to have over half of its constituents to vote in favor. They merged into the new Garner–Hayfield–Ventura Community School District on July 1, 2015.

== Schools ==
It previously operated Garner–Hayfield K–8 (Elementary and Middle) and Garner–Hayfield High.
