= Garner, Iowa =

- City
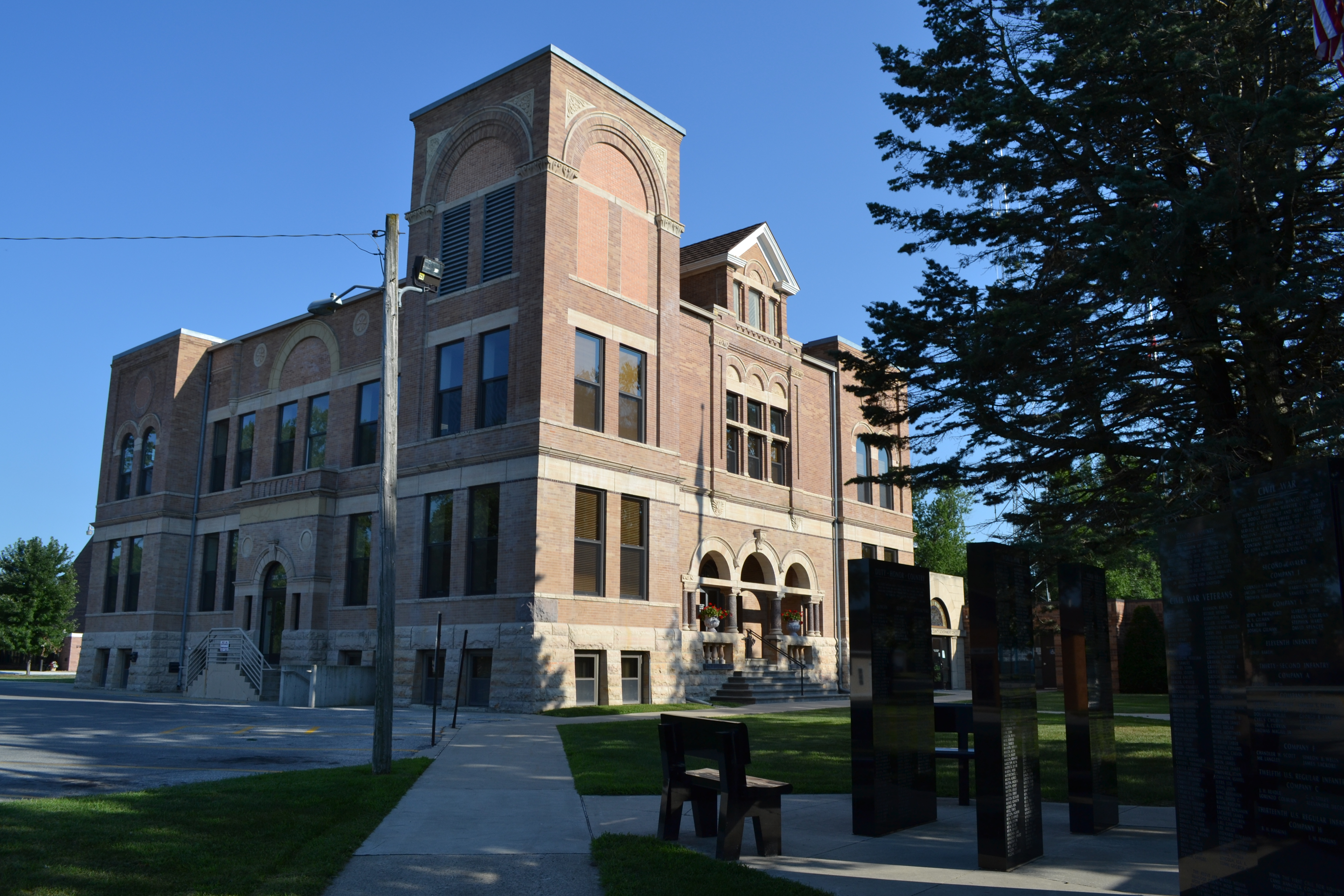
- Hancock County Courthouse
- Motto: The Jewel In The Crown Of Iowa
- Location of Garner, Iowa
- Coordinates: 43°5′53″N 93°36′15″W
- Country: USA
- State: Iowa
- County: Hancock
- Incorporated: November 19, 1881

Area
  - Total: 2.12 sq mi (5.50 km^{2})
  - Land: 2.12 sq mi (5.50 km^{2})
  - Water: 0 sq mi (0.00 km^{2})
- Elevation: 1,217 ft (371 m)

Population (2020)
  - Total: 3,065
  - Density: 1,442.2/sq mi (556.83/km^{2})
- Time zone: UTC-6 (Central (CST))
  - Summer (DST): UTC-5 (CDT)
- ZIP code: 50438
- Area code: 641
- FIPS code: 19-29955
- GNIS feature ID: 2394857
- Website: www.garneriowa.org

Garner is a city in and the county seat of Hancock County, Iowa, United States. The population was 3,065 in the 2020 census, an increase from 2,922 in 2000.

== History ==
Garner was named after Col. W. W. Garner, a civil engineer on the Chicago, Milwaukee & St. Paul Railroad. In 1870, Garner was platted by the Chicago, Milwaukee and St. Paul Railway and was incorporated in 1881 with a population of 321 at that time. In the 1880s, the Duesenberg brothers, who later went on to build the Duesenberg automobile, operated a bicycle sales and repair business in Garner.

In the early days of Hancock County the court house was located approximately one mile south of Garner in what was known as Concord. The Concord Court House was platted on April 9, 1859, on a lot known as "the Court Square in a village known as Amsterdam but apparently never built. Later, on November 4, 1865, a site for the county seat was proposed. Soon after, John Maben, under the auspices of the Board of Supervisors built two small wooden buildings in an area they called "Hancock Center." That building was replaced by a brick building in 1869. That court house continued as the county seat until 1899 when a new court house was built in Garner. In 1898 the town of Britt located a few miles to the west launched a campaign to relocate the County Seat to their town; a plan that was never instituted after some legal intervention by a group of attorneys. Subsequently, building of the "Klondike" railroad that ran through Garner resulted in the building of a new courthouse with the laying of the cornerstone on June 8, 1899, That regal building continues to serve the people of Hancock County to this day.

In 1895 the famous evangelist Billy Sunday held his first revival meeting at Garner, Iowa; nearly 100 persons accepted Christ during the week of meetings. Each year Garner celebrates "Duesey Days." The town celebration gets its name from Frederick and August Duesenberg. The Duesenberg brothers had their meager beginning in a bicycle shop on Main Street in Garner but went on to found Duesenberg Motors Company (sometimes referred to as "Duesy"), an American manufacturer of race cars and luxury automobiles.

== Geography ==
Garner is located on the East Branch Iowa River. According to the United States Census Bureau, the city has a total area of 2.06 square miles (5.34 km^{2}), all land.

== Demographics ==
Historical population
Census	Pop.	Note	%±
1880	321		—
1890	679		111.5%
1900	1,288		89.7%
1910	1,028		−20.2%
1920	1,311		27.5%
1930	1,241		−5.3%
1940	1,549		24.8%
1950	1,696		9.5%
1960	1,990		17.3%
1970	2,257		13.4%
1980	2,908		28.8%
1990	2,916		0.3%
2000	2,922		0.2%
2010	3,129		7.1%
2020	3,065		−2.0%
U.S. Decennial Census

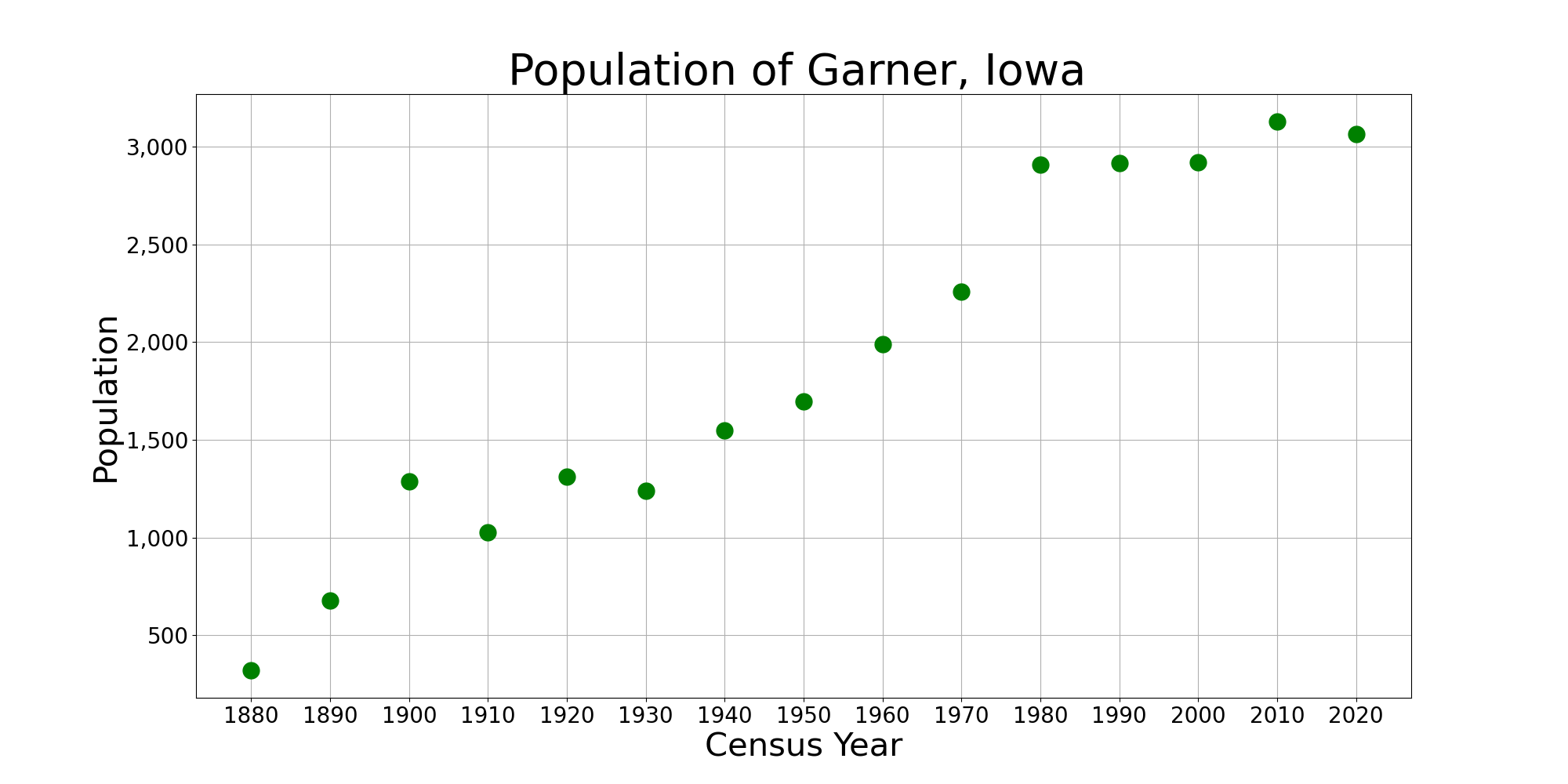
The population of Garner, Iowa from US census data

=== 2020 census ===
As of the 2020 census, there were 3,065 people, 1,325 households, and 849 families residing in the city. The population density was 1,442.2 inhabitants per square mile (556.8/km^{2}). There were 1,406 housing units at an average density of 661.6 per square mile (255.4/km^{2}), of which 5.8% were vacant. The homeowner vacancy rate was 1.4% and the rental vacancy rate was 8.2%.

The median age in the city was 43.5 years. 24.6% of residents were under the age of 20, including 22.8% under the age of 18; 5.3% were between the ages of 20 and 24; 22.1% were from 25 to 44; 23.9% were from 45 to 64; and 24.1% were 65 years of age or older. For every 100 females there were 98.5 males, and for every 100 females age 18 and over there were 92.4 males age 18 and over. The gender makeup of the city was 49.6% male and 50.4% female.

Of the 1,325 households, 27.5% had children under the age of 18 living with them. Of all households, 53.1% were married-couple households, 4.8% were cohabitating couple households, 24.8% had a female householder with no spouse or partner present, and 17.4% had a male householder with no spouse or partner present. About 35.9% were non-families, 32.1% were made up of individuals, and 17.7% had someone living alone who was 65 years of age or older.

0.0% of residents lived in urban areas, while 100.0% lived in rural areas.

Racial composition as of the 2020 census
Race	Number	Percent
White	2,867	93.5%
Black or African American	30	1.0%
American Indian and Alaska Native	7	0.2%
Asian	7	0.2%
Native Hawaiian and Other Pacific Islander	0	0.0%
Some other race	29	0.9%
Two or more races	125	4.1%
Hispanic or Latino (of any race)	120	3.9%

=== 2010 census ===
At the 2010 census there were 3,129 people in 1,301 households, including 881 families, in the city. The population density was 1,518.9 inhabitants per square mile (586.5/km^{2}). There were 1,380 housing units at an average density of 669.9 per square mile (258.6/km^{2}). The racial makeup of the city was 97.3% White, 0.6% African American, 0.3% Asian, 0.4% from other races, and 1.3% from two or more races. Hispanic or Latino of any race were 2.0%.

Of the 1,301 households 30.8% had children under the age of 18 living with them, 57.0% were married couples living together, 7.6% had a female householder with no husband present, 3.2% had a male householder with no wife present, and 32.3% were non-families. 29.0% of households were one person and 16% were one person aged 65 or older. The average household size was 2.37 and the average family size was 2.91.

The median age was 41.6 years. 25.6% of residents were under the age of 18; 5.3% were between the ages of 18 and 24; 22.4% were from 25 to 44; 27.3% were from 45 to 64; and 19.5% were 65 or older. The gender makeup of the city was 48.6% male and 51.4% female.

=== 2000 census ===
At the 2000 census there were 2,922 people in 1,192 households, including 822 families, in the city. The population density was 1,398.7 inhabitants per square mile (540.0/km^{2}). There were 1,252 housing units at an average density of 599.3 per square mile (231.4/km^{2}). The racial makeup of the city was 98.97% White, 0.03% African American, 0.38% Asian, 0.07% Pacific Islander, 0.21% from other races, and 0.34% from two or more races. Hispanic or Latino of any race were 0.72%.

Of the 1,192 households 33.5% had children under the age of 18 living with them, 59.0% were married couples living together, 7.0% had a female householder with no husband present, and 31.0% were non-families. 28.7% of households were one person and 16.6% were one person aged 65 or older. The average household size was 2.41 and the average family size was 2.95.

Age spread: 25.8% under the age of 18, 7.3% from 18 to 24, 25.1% from 25 to 44, 23.1% from 45 to 64, and 18.8% 65 or older. The median age was 40 years. For every 100 females, there were 90.6 males. For every 100 females age 18 and over, there were 89.6 males.

The median household income was $39,750 and the median family income was $48,514. Males had a median income of $32,813 versus $19,741 for females. The per capita income for the city was $18,976. About 4.7% of families and 5.4% of the population were below the poverty line, including 6.8% of those under age 18 and 9.1% of those age 65 or over.

== Manufacturing ==
Garner is home to three manufacturing companies. Stellar Industries is a manufacturer of mechanics trucks, telescopic service cranes, hooklifts and tire service truck packages. Iowa Mold Tooling Company Inc. designs and manufactures mechanics trucks, lube trucks, tire trucks, air compressor and truck mounted cranes. Garner also has a variety of other small manufacturing companies.

== Education ==
Garner is a part of the Garner–Hayfield–Ventura Community School District, which was established on July 1, 2015, with the merger of the Garner–Hayfield and Ventura Community School Districts.

== Notable people ==
- Alvin Baldus (1926–2017), U.S. representative from Wisconsin
- Fred (1876–1932) and August Duesenberg (1879–1955), automobile manufacturers
- Walter E. Edelen (1911–1991), Iowa state senator
- Dennis Hejlik, United States Marine Corps lieutenant general
- Henry Rayhons (born 1936), Iowa state representative
- Billy Sunday (1862–1935), evangelist and baseball player
- Linda Upmeyer (born 1952), speaker of the Iowa House of Representatives

== See also ==
- Hancock County Courthouse
- St Paul Lutheran Church
