= Iowa Highway 60 (1920–1968) =

Former state highway in Iowa, United States

Iowa Highway 60
- Iowa 60 highlighted in red

Route information
- Length: 223.8 mi (360.2 km)
- Existed: July 1, 1920–December 31, 1968

Major junctions
- South end: Route 5 south of Cincinnati
- Iowa 2 in Centerville; US 34 in Albia; Iowa 92 in Knoxville; I-35 near West Des Moines; I-80 / I-235 in West Des Moines; US 30 near Boone; US 20 in Webster City; Iowa 3 at Goldfield
- North end: US 18 near Wesley

Location
- Country: United States
- State: Iowa
- Counties: Appanoose; Monroe; Marion; Warren County; Polk; Boone; Hamilton; Wright County; Hancock

Highway system
- Iowa Primary Highway System; Interstate; US; State; Secondary; Scenic
← Iowa 60	→ US 61

Iowa Highway 60 (Iowa 60) was a 223-mile-long (360 km) state highway that ran from the Missouri state line near Cincinnati, where it continued as Route 5, to U.S. Highway 18 (US 18) near Wesley. The highway passed through Centerville, Knoxville, Des Moines, and Webster City during its trek. It was an original state highway that was in service for 48 years. The highway originally only extended from Des Moines to Goldfield, but was extended in 1931. At that time, it absorbed Iowa Highway 6. On January 1, 1969, the highway ceased to exist. The Iowa State Highway Commission renumbered several state highways in order to match up route numbers with adjacent state highways. It was replaced by Iowa 5 south of Des Moines and Iowa 17 north of Granger.

== Route description ==
Iowa 60 entered the state as a continuation of Route 5. It headed northeast through Cincinnati and then curved to the north towards Centerville where it intersected Iowa 2. It then continued north through Moravia and into Albia. There, it intersected US 34 on the south side of town and Iowa 137 on the north side. North of Albia, the highway took a northwesterly route through Lovilia and Attica and into Knoxville. At Main Street in Knoxville, it met Iowa 92 and the two highways headed west together through the city. They turned north on Roche Street for a couple blocks before turning west again on Pleasant Street. They met Iowa 14 a few blocks south of the Knoxville Raceway. Just south of Pleasantville, the two highways split as Iowa 92 headed west, Iowa 60 north, and Iowa 181 headed south towards Melcher and Dallas.

Iowa 60 continued northwest through Pleasantville and Hartford. Just to the north of Carlisle, the highway came up from the south to a four-way intersection with Iowa 46, which formed the northern leg. A gravel road was the eastern leg and northbound Iowa 60 took the western leg. As the highway entered Des Moines it headed due west on Army Post Road, on which it intersected US 65 / US 69. Near the Des Moines Airport, it met Iowa 28. The road continued west until it reached I-35 near the Raccoon River. From that interchange, Iowa 60 followed I-35 north along the western side of the Des Moines metro area. I-80 joined I-35 / Iowa 60 in West Des Moines. Iowa 60 split away from the Interstate Highways at the Rider Corner, a large bend where I-35 / I-80 turned to the east. Iowa 64, which had been following I-80 from the east, also turned off at the corner; Iowa 141 also began at the corner. The three highways headed north together until Iowa 64 turned west at Grimes. Near Granger, Iowa 60 split away to the north while Iowa 141 continued northwest towards Perry.

From Granger, Iowa 60 headed north over the Des Moines River and through Madrid, where it met Iowa 89. After passing through Luther, it met US 30 at an interchange. It continued north toward Stanhope, where it briefly overlapped Iowa 175. In downtown Webster City, US 20 joined up with Iowa 60 and the two highways headed west through the town. Between Webster City and Duncombe, Iowa 60 turned north. After passing through Eagle Grove, it met Iowa 3 in Goldfield. A couple miles later, Iowa 60 turned north toward Renwick and Corwith. Iowa 60 ended at an intersection with US 18 just northeast of Wesley.

== History ==
Primary Road No. 60 was an original state highway that extended from Des Moines to Goldfield. The highway began at the corner of Grand Avenue, which carried No. 2, and 6th Avenue in downtown Des Moines. In 1926, when the U.S. Highway System came into being, No. 2 became U.S. Highway 32 (US 32) and No. 60 became Iowa 60. In 1931, the highway was extended at both ends. To the south, it was extended to the Missouri state line, absorbing all of what had been known as Iowa 6. The renumbering of US 32 to US 6 that year necessitated the Iowa 6 route number change. At the north end, a new road was built from Goldfield to US 18 near Wesley.

Overall, Iowa 60's route remained largely the same for the rest of existence. The only major route changes occurred through the Des Moines area. When the route was extended southward in 1931, it followed US 6 east to US 63 near the Iowa State Fairgrounds where it picked up the former Iowa 6 routing. In the early 1950s, Army Post Road on Des Moines's south side was extended east to Iowa 60. When that road opened, Iowa 60 was rerouted onto it and US 65 / US 69 north to University Avenue. Iowa 46 replaced Iowa 60 north of Army Post Road to the state fairgrounds. After the Interstate Highway System came into being and I-35 and I-80 were completed through Des Moines, Iowa 60 was rerouted again west on Army Post Road to I-35 and north onto a new Iowa 141 routing. Iowa 415 was created to replace most of Iowa 60 from Des Moines to near Madrid.

On January 1, 1969, Iowa 60 ceased to be. The Iowa State Highway Commission renumbered several state highways, including Iowa 60, in order to match route numbers to those in neighboring states. The following changes affected Iowa 60:

- Iowa 4 was renumbered Iowa 39
- Iowa 17 was renumbered Iowa 4 to match Minnesota State Highway 4
- Iowa 33 was renumbered Iowa 60 to match Minnesota State Highway 60
- Iowa 60 north of Granger was renumbered Iowa 17
- Iowa 60 south of Des Moines was renumbered Iowa 5 to match Missouri Route 5
- Iowa 60 between Des Moines and Granger was deemed an unnecessary duplication and removed

== Major intersections ==
County	Location	mi	km	Destinations	Notes
Appanoose	Franklin Township	0.0	0.0	Route 5 south – Unionville	Continuation into Missouri
Appanoose	Pleasant–Caldwell township line	8.2	13.2	Iowa 216 east – Exline	
Appanoose	Pleasant–Caldwell township line	11.1	17.9	Iowa 277 west – Numa	
Appanoose	Centerville	13.6	21.9	Iowa 2 – Corydon, Bloomfield	
Monroe	Albia	34.2	55.0	US 34 – Chariton, Ottumwa	
Monroe	Albia	35.4	57.0	Iowa 137 north – Eddyville	
Marion	Liberty Township	51.5	82.9	Iowa 156 east – Bussey	
Marion	Knoxville	61.9	99.6	Iowa 92 east (E. Main Street) – Oskaloosa	Eastern end of Iowa 92 overlap
Marion	Knoxville	63.2	101.7	Iowa 14 (Lincoln Street) – Chariton, Newton	
Marion	Pleasant Grove Township	71.7	115.4	Iowa 92 west / Iowa 181 south – Indianola, Dallas, Melcher	Western end of Iowa 92 overlap
Warren	No major junctions				
Polk	Allen Township	91.5	147.3	Iowa 46 north	
Polk	Des Moines	95.2	153.2	US 65 / US 69 (SE 14th Street)	
Polk	Bloomfield Township	99.2	159.6	Iowa 28 south – Norwalk	
Polk	Bloomfield Township	104.4	168.0	I-35 south – Kansas City	Interchange; southern end of I-35 overlap
Polk	West Des Moines	105.4	169.6	Iowa 90 west (Grand Avenue)	Interchange
Polk	West Des Moines	108.9	175.3	I-80 west / I-235 east – Council Bluffs, Des Moines	Interchange; southern end of I-80 overlap
Polk	West Des Moines	109.5	176.2	University Avenue	Interchange
Polk	Clive	110.5	177.8	US 6 (Hickman Road) – Adel	Interchange
Polk	Urbandale	111.5	179.4	Douglas Avenue	Interchange
Polk	Urbandale	112.9	181.7	I-35 north / I-80 east / Iowa 64 east / Iowa 141 begins – Minneapolis, Chicago	Interchange; northern end of I-35 and I-80 overlaps; southern end of Iowa 64 and Iowa 141 overlaps
Polk	Webster–Jefferson township line	115.6	186.0	Iowa 64 west – Grimes	Northern end of Iowa 64 overlap
Polk–Dallas county line	Granger	121.3	195.2	Iowa 141 west – Perry	Northern end of Iowa 141 overlap
Boone	Madrid	130.1	209.4	Iowa 89 west – Woodward	
Boone	Worth–Colfax– Des Moines–Jackson township quadripoint	141.0	226.9	US 30 – Boone, Ames	Interchange
Webster	Clear Lake Township	158.2	254.6	Iowa 175 west – Stratford	Southern end of Iowa 175 overlap
Webster	Stanhope	159.7	257.0	Iowa 175 east – Jewell	Northern end of Iowa 175 overlap
Webster	Webster City	172.4	277.5	US 20 east – Iowa Falls	Eastern end of US 20 overlap
Webster	Freedom–Fremont township line	177.4	285.5	US 20 west – Fort Dodge	Western end of US 20 overlap
Wright	Troy Township	184.3	296.6	Iowa 323 east – Woolstock	
Wright	Goldfield	195.7	314.9	Iowa 3 east – Clarion	Eastern end of Iowa 3 overlap
Wright–Humboldt county line	Eagle Grove–Liberty– Norway–Lake township quadripoint	198.5	319.5	Iowa 3 west – Humboldt	Western end of Iowa 3 overlap
Kossuth–Hancock county line	Wesley–Orthel township line	223.8	360.2	US 18 – Algona, Clear Lake	
1.000 mi = 1.609 km; 1.000 km = 0.621 mi
