= Iowa Highway 17 =

State highway in Iowa, United States

Iowa Highway 17
- Iowa 17 highlighted in red

Route information
- Maintained by Iowa DOT
- Length: 102.789 mi (165.423 km)
- Existed: January 1, 1969–present
- History: Iowa 60: 1919 – December 31, 1968

Major junctions
- South end: Iowa 141 near Granger
- US 30 near Boone; US 20 at Webster City; Iowa 3 at Goldfield
- North end: US 18 near Wesley

Location
- Country: United States
- State: Iowa
- Counties: Polk; Boone; Hamilton; Wright; Kossuth

Highway system
- Iowa Primary Highway System; Interstate; US; State; Secondary; Scenic
← Iowa 16	→ US 18

Iowa Highway 17 (Iowa 17) is a 103-mile-long (166 km) north–south state highway that traverses primarily rural areas in central and north-central Iowa. Iowa 17's southern end is near Granger in Dallas County at a freeway interchange with Iowa Highway 141, and its northern terminus is at an intersection with U.S. Highway 18 at the Kossuth-Hancock county line near Wesley.

== Route description ==
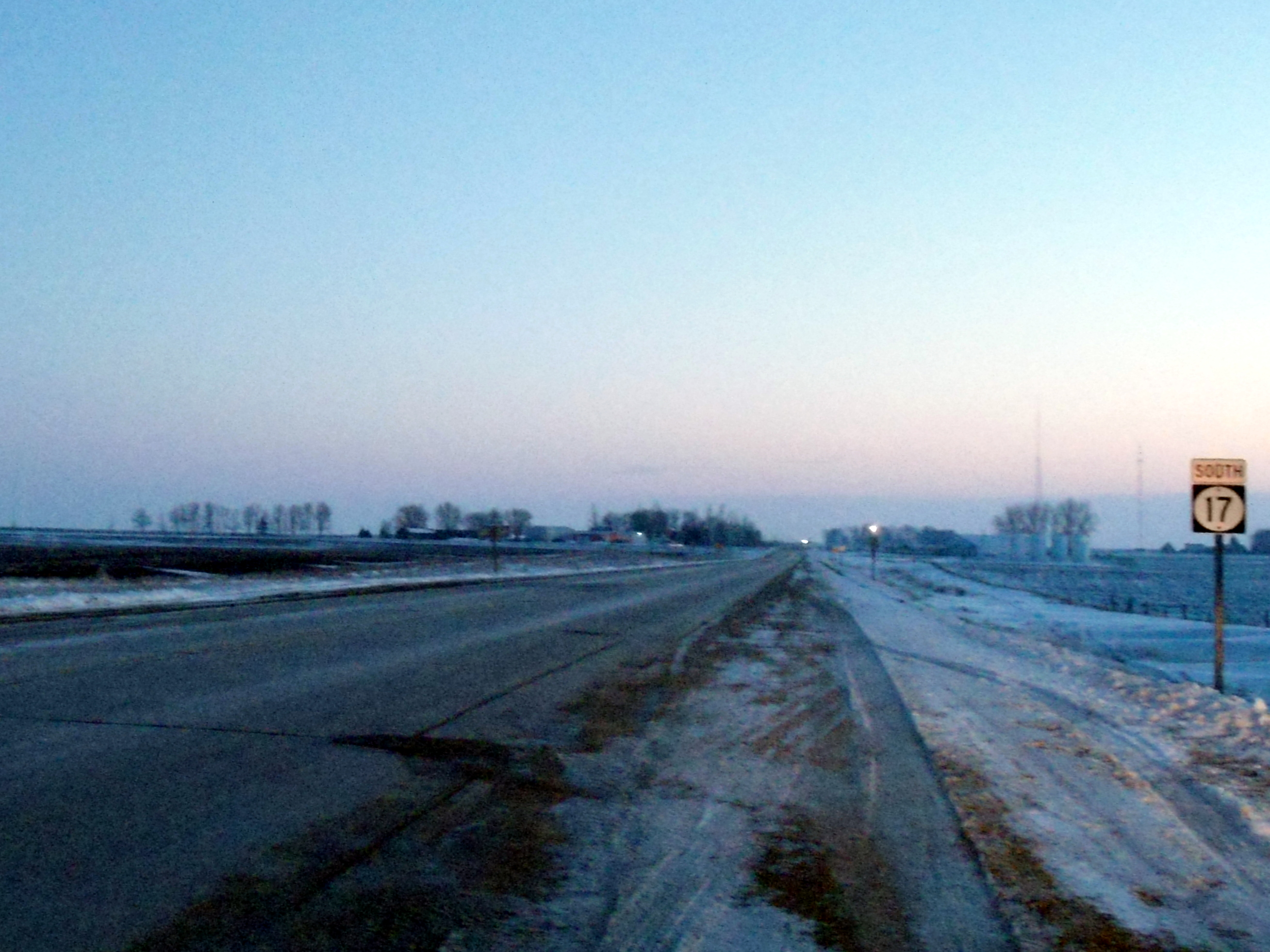
Iowa 17 near Wesley

Iowa Highway 17 begins at a trumpet interchange with Iowa Highway 141 near Granger. It goes north to Madrid, where it intersects Iowa Highway 210. It continues north through Luther and then intersects U.S. Highway 30 east of Boone. It proceeds north from U.S. 30 and has a one-mile (1.6 km) overlap with Iowa Highway 175 in Stanhope. It goes north, then turns northwest to go towards Webster City, and intersects U.S. Highway 20 there. They overlap going west from Webster City, then Iowa 17 turns north to go through Eagle Grove. It continues north to Goldfield, where it intersects Iowa Highway 3. Iowa 17 and Iowa 3 overlap to the border between Wright and Humboldt Counties, then Iowa 17 turns north. It passes through Renwick and Corwith, then ends on the border separating Hancock and Kossuth Counties east of Wesley.

== History ==
Although Iowa 17 has only been designated since 1969, most of the route has been a part of the primary highway system since the system's inception in 1919. The route was designated Primary Road No. 60 and connected Des Moines and Goldfield via Webster City. By 1930, the only paved section of what was by then called Iowa 60 was the southernmost 20 miles (32 km) from Des Moines to south of Madrid. In two years, paving extended to US 30 east of Boone.

1932 saw many changes to Iowa 60. The route was extended 30 miles (48 km) to the north where it ended at US 18 in Wesley, and extended southward through Des Moines and Knoxville to the Missouri state line, effectively doubling its length. The section of Iowa 60 south of Des Moines is now known as Iowa 5.

Little changed in the Iowa 60 north of Des Moines over the next twenty years. The only paving that was completed was in Wright County. By 1957, that paving extended to the northern end at US 18.

On January 1, 1969, the Iowa State Highway Commission renumbered several state highways in the state. They sought to create continuous numbers across state lines and remove unnecessary duplicate route numbers where they could. Since it crossed the state line into Missouri, the southern half of the route was renumbered Iowa 5 to match Missouri Route 5. Throughout Des Moines, Iowa 60 overlapped many other routes, so the designation was removed between the I-35/now-Iowa 5 interchange to the intersection with Iowa 141 in Granger. The section of Iowa 60 north of Granger became Iowa 17.

Since becoming Iowa 17, the route has changed little. By 1976, paving was completed and the southern end of the route was converted into an interchange with Iowa 141. By the end of the 1970s, the highway was rerouted around Webster City when US 20 was realigned onto a new freeway.

== Major intersections ==
County	Location	mi	km	Destinations	Notes
Dallas–Polk county line	Granger	0.000	0.000	Iowa 141 – Grimes, Perry, Des Moines	
Polk	No major junctions				
Boone	Madrid	8.764	14.104	Iowa 210 west (1st Street) – Woodward	Southern end of Iowa 210 overlap
Boone	Madrid	8.842	14.230	Iowa 210 east (North Street) – Slater	Northern end of Iowa 210 overlap
Boone	Jackson–Colfax township line	19.656	31.633	US 30 – Boone, Ames	
Hamilton	Clear Lake Township	36.903	59.390	Iowa 175 west – Stratford	Southern end of Iowa 175 overlap
Hamilton	Stanhope	37.898	60.991	Iowa 175 east – Jewell	Northern end of Iowa 175 overlap
Hamilton	Webster City	49.825	80.186	US 20 east – Waterloo	Southern end of US 20 overlap
Hamilton	Freedom Township	54.372	87.503	US 20 west – Fort Dodge	Northern end of US 20 overlap
Wright	Goldfield	74.712	120.237	Iowa 3 east – Clarion	Southern end of Iowa 3 overlap
Humboldt–Wright county line	Lake–Norway– Liberty–Eagle Grove township quadripoint	77.569	124.835	Iowa 3 west – Dakota City	Northern end of Iowa 3 overlap
Kossuth–Hancock county line	Wesley–Orthel township line	102.789	165.423	US 18 – Britt, Algona	
1.000 mi = 1.609 km; 1.000 km = 0.621 mi
