= Iowa Highway 3 =

State highway in Iowa, United States

Iowa Highway 3
- American Veterans Memorial Highway
- Iowa 3 highlighted in red

Route information
- Maintained by Iowa DOT
- Length: 323.102 mi (519.982 km)
- Existed: 1945–present

Major junctions
- West end: SD 50 west of Westfield
- US 75 at Le Mars; US 59 at Cherokee; US 71 near Truesdale; US 169 at Humboldt; US 69 near Rowan; I-35 near Latimer; US 65 at Hampton; US 218 / Iowa 27 at Waverly; US 63 near Denver; US 52 / Iowa 136 at Luxemburg
- East end: Northwest Arterial at Dubuque

Location
- Country: United States
- State: Iowa
- Counties: Plymouth; Cherokee; Buena Vista; Pocahontas; Humboldt; Wright; Franklin; Butler; Bremer; Fayette; Clayton; Delaware; Dubuque

Highway system
- Iowa Primary Highway System; Interstate; US; State; Secondary; Scenic
← Iowa 2	→ Iowa 4

Iowa Highway 3 (Iowa 3) is a state highway that runs from east to west across the state of Iowa. It is the longest state highway in Iowa, at 323 miles (520 km) long. Iowa 3 begins at the South Dakota state line where it continues as South Dakota Highway 50 and ends at the Northwest Arterial at the Dubuque city limits. It is designated the American Veterans Memorial Highway for its entirety. It is located approximately halfway between Interstate 80 and Interstate 90.

== Route description ==
Iowa 3 runs for 323.129 miles (520.026 km) across the northern third of the state, roughly midway between US 18 to the north and US 20 to the south. All of Iowa 3 east of Le Mars has been listed on the National Highway System, a network of roads important to the country's economy, defense, and mobility.

Iowa 3 begins at the Big Sioux River where it continues west into South Dakota as South Dakota Highway 50. Shortly after entering Iowa, the highway intersects Iowa 12. Iowa 3 traffic turns north onto Iowa 12 and the two highways travel together toward Akron. There, the two highways split as Iowa 3 heads east toward Le Mars where it meets U.S. Highway 75 (US 75) and its business route. The highway continues east toward Remsen and Marcus where it meets Iowa 140 and Iowa 143 in each respective town. At Cherokee, the highway intersects US 59 and skirts the northeastern edge of town. North of Aurelia, Iowa 3 meets Iowa 7. Northeast of Truesdale, Iowa 3 intersects US 71.

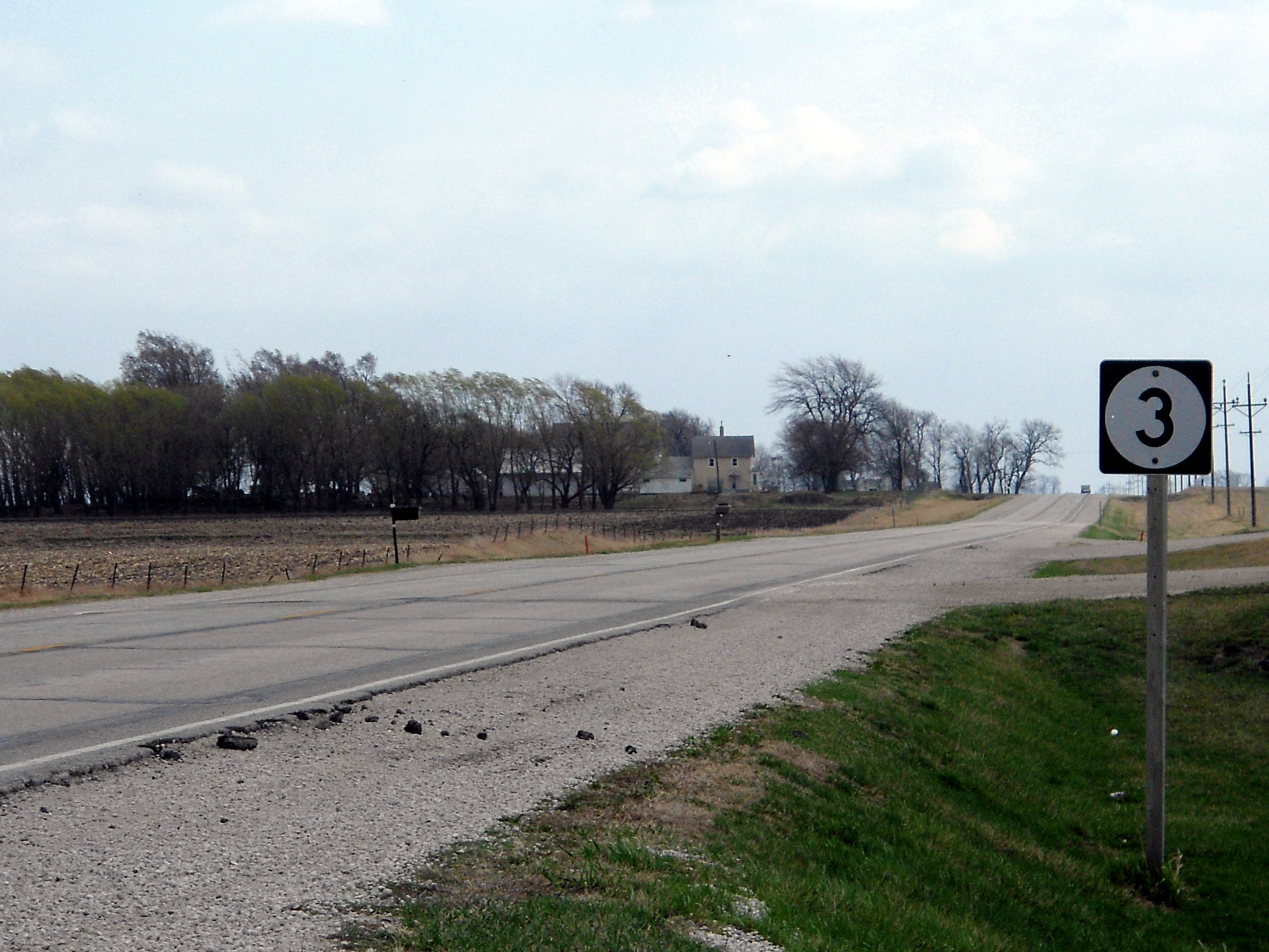
Iowa 3 runs east of Humboldt.

Continuing east, Iowa 3 intersects Iowa 4 in Pocahontas. Between Pocahontas and Gilmore City, Iowa 3 meets Iowa 15. Iowa 3 intersects US 169 in Humboldt. East of Humboldt, Iowa 3 is overlapped briefly by Iowa 17 near Goldfield. Iowa 3 overlaps US 69 east of Clarion. Between Latimer and Coulter, Iowa 3 meets I-35 at a diamond interchange. East of that interchange in Hampton, Iowa 3 intersects US 65. At Allison, Iowa 3 is briefly overlapped by Iowa 14. Iowa 3 meets Iowa 188 south of Clarksville.

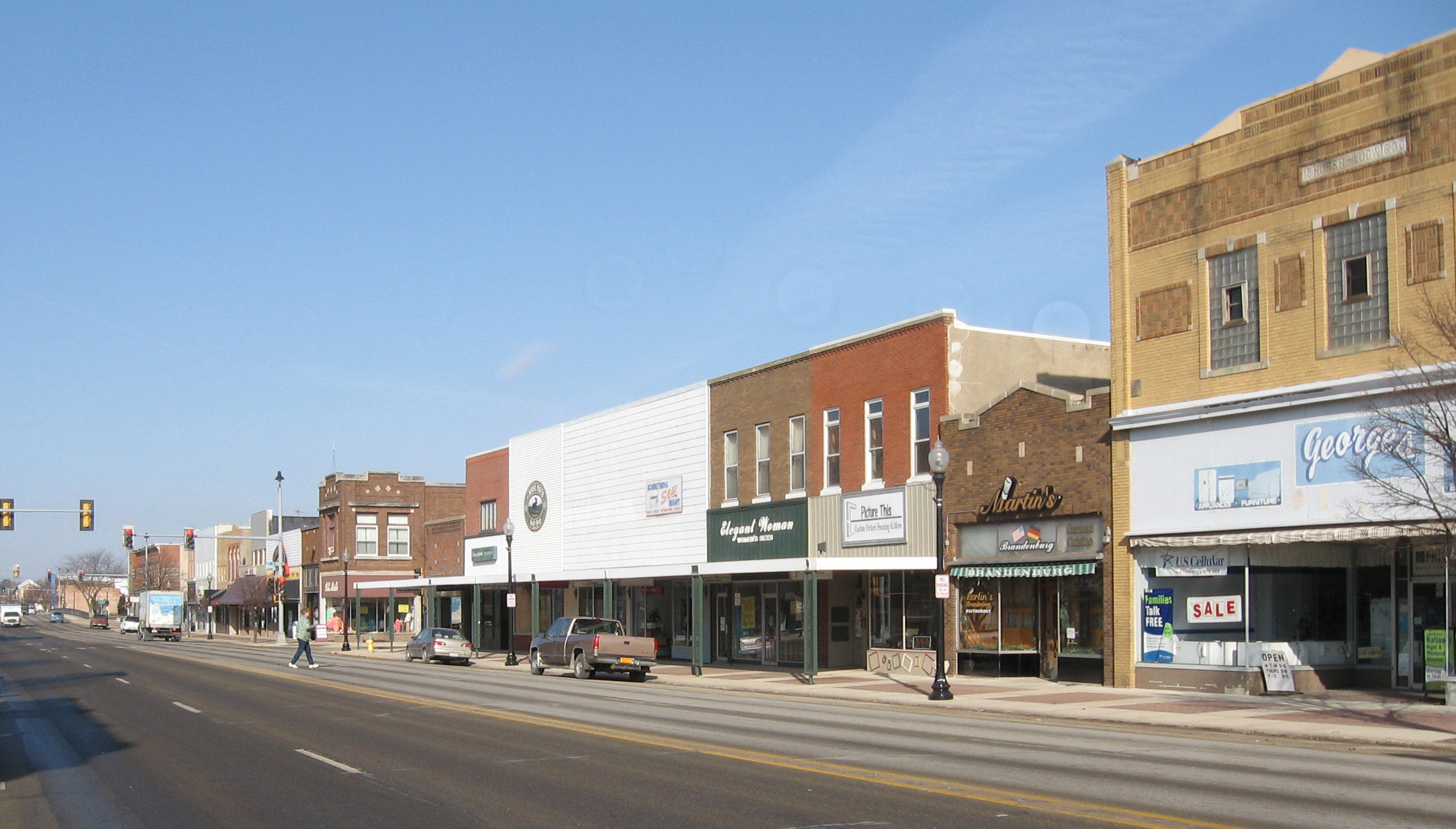
Iowa 3 runs along Bremer Avenue in Waverly.

West of Waverly, Iowa 3 intersects US 218 / Iowa 27, the Avenue of the Saints highway, at an interchange. Through Waverly, Iowa 3 is overlapped by US 218 Business before that route turns south to rejoin US 218. Just north of Denver, Iowa 3 intersects US 63 at a diamond interchange. At Oelwein, Iowa 3 overlaps Iowa 150 before continuing east towards Iowa 187. From Strawberry Point to near Edgewood, Iowa 3 overlaps Iowa 13. East of Edgewood, Iowa 3 enters the Driftless Area, where the terrain changes markedly from gently rolling farmland to steep bluffs; the intersection with Iowa 38 is located on the edge of the Driftless Area. At Luxemburg, Iowa 3 meets US 52 and Iowa 136. The next 22 miles (35 km), from Luxemburg to Sageville, are particularly curvy because of the terrain. At the city limits between Sageville and Dubuque, Iowa 3 ends at the Northwest Arterial, which carried Iowa 32 prior to 2020.

== History ==
Original Iowa 3
Now known as Iowa Highway 2; that road was renumbered in 1939
Current Iowa 3 (as routed in 1920)
No. 12 – Westfield to Akron
No. 27 – Akron to Le Mars
No. 5 – Le Mars to near Aurelia
Gap between Aurelia and Pocahontas
No. 10 – Pocahontas to Strawberry Point
No. 13 – Strawberry Point to near Edgewood
Gap between Edgewood and Luxemburg
No. 20 – Luxemburg to Dubuque
Designated Iowa 3 on May 15, 1945
Extended to SD 50 in 1949
Overlapped by Iowa 5 until 1969
Rerouted through Dubuque due to reconstruction of US 61/US 151
Dubuque changes
SW Arterial constructed
US 52 rerouted
Iowa 3 ends at NW Arterial

This is the second state highway to be designated Iowa 3. The first Iowa 3 existed from 1920 to 1941, and was an east–west route across the southern part of Iowa, beginning at Fort Madison and ending at the western border of Iowa near Nebraska City, Nebraska. The current Iowa 3 route was designated in 1945.

Originally extending from Iowa 12 in Akron to Dubuque, Iowa 3 was co-signed with Iowa 5 from Akron to near Aurelia. In 1949, Iowa 3 was extended along Iowa 12 from Akron to its current western end at the Big Sioux River.

Prior to the building of a four lane US 61 / US 151, the eastern end of Iowa 3 was at the intersection of Bluff Street and U.S. Route 20, Dodge Street.

== Major intersections ==
County	Location	mi	km	Destinations	Notes
Big Sioux River		0.000	0.000	SD 50 west – Vermillion	Continuation into South Dakota
Big Sioux River		0.000	0.000	South Dakota–Iowa state line	
Plymouth	Westfield Township	1.479	2.380	Iowa 12 south – Sioux City	Western end of Iowa 12 overlap
Plymouth	Akron	6.214	10.000	Iowa 12 north (Loess Hills Scenic Byway) – Hawarden	Eastern end of Iowa 12 overlap
Plymouth	Johnson Township	17.617	28.352	CR K22 – Sioux City	Former Iowa 7
Plymouth	America Township	26.061	41.941	US 75 / US 75 Bus. begins – Alton, Sioux City	Western end of US 75 Business overlap
Plymouth	Le Mars	27.618	44.447	US 75 Bus. north (5th Avenue West)	Eastern end of US 75 Business overlap; former US 75
Plymouth	Remsen	38.987	62.743	Iowa 140 south / CR L14 north – Kingsley	
Cherokee	Marcus	47.011	75.657	Iowa 143 north / CR L36 south to US 20 – Marcus	
Cherokee	Cherokee Township	60.441	97.270	US 59 – Cherokee, Primghar	
Cherokee	Cherokee Township	63.110	101.566	CR C38 – Cherokee	Former Iowa 977
Cherokee	Afton Township	66.481	106.991	Iowa 7 east – Aurelia	
Buena Vista	Scott–Lincoln township line	81.508	131.174	US 71 – Storm Lake, Spencer	
Buena Vista	Fairfield Township	91.576	147.377	CR N14 – Albert City	Former Iowa 197
Pocahontas	Pocahontas	106.208	170.925	Iowa 4 – Pomeroy, Mallard	
Pocahontas	Garfield–Lake township line	113.208	182.191	Iowa 15 north / CR N65 south – Rolfe, Manson	
Humboldt	Humboldt	129.190	207.911	US 169 – Fort Dodge, Algona	
Humboldt	Lake–Norway township line	138.203	222.416	CR P66 – Thor	Former Iowa 302
Humboldt–Wright county line	Lake–Liberty township line	142.198	228.845	Iowa 17 north – Renwick	Western end of Iowa 17 overlap
Wright	Goldfield	145.054	233.442	Iowa 17 south – Eagle Grove	Eastern end of Iowa 17 overlap
Wright	Grant–Lincoln township line	159.210	256.224	US 69 south – Jewell	Western end of US 69 overlap
Wright	Grant–Iowa township line	161.100	259.265	US 69 north – Belmond	Eastern end of US 69 overlap
Wright	Rowan	164.382	264.547	CR R65	Former Iowa 353
Franklin	Scott Township	168.170	270.643	CR S14 – Alexander, Meservey	Former Iowa 107
Franklin	Scott Township	172.284	277.264	I-35 – Des Moines, Minneapolis	I-35 exit 165
Franklin	Marion Township	176.674	284.329	CR S25 – Coulter, Latimer	Former Iowa 263
Franklin	Hampton	182.279	293.350	US 65 – Iowa Falls, Mason City	
Butler	West Point Township	197.759	318.262	CR T24 – Bristow	Former Iowa 326
Butler	Allison	202.515	325.916	Iowa 14 north – Greene	Western end of Iowa 14 overlap
Butler	Allison	203.521	327.535	Iowa 14 south – Parkersburg	Eastern end of Iowa 14 overlap
Butler	Butler Township	210.010	337.978	Iowa 188 north – Clarksville	
Bremer	Washington Township	217.384	349.846	US 218 / Iowa 27 – Cedar Falls, Waterloo, Charles City	
Bremer	Waverly	219.880	353.863	US 218 Bus. north (20th Street West)	Western end of US 218 Business overlap
Bremer	Waverly	220.870	355.456	US 218 Bus. south (Easton Avenue)	Eastern end of US 218 Business overlap
Bremer	Jefferson Township	228.161	367.190	US 63 – Denver, New Hampton	
Bremer	Maxfield Township	233.693	376.092	Quarter Avenue – Readlyn	Former Iowa 241
Fayette	Jefferson Township	249.711	401.871	Iowa 150 north – Maynard	Western end of Iowa 150 overlap
Fayette	Oelwein	252.232	405.928	Iowa 150 south – Independence	Eastern end of Iowa 150 overlap
Fayette	Putnam Township	266.048– 266.070	428.163– 428.198	Iowa 187 – Arlington, Lamont	Roundabout; former Iowa 154
Clayton	Strawberry Point	271.771	437.373	Iowa 13 north – Elkader	Western end of Iowa 13 overlap
Clayton	Cass Township	273.414	440.017	CR W68 – Backbone State Park	Former Iowa 410
Clayton–Delaware county line	Lodomillo–Honey Creek township line	277.512	446.612	Iowa 13 south – Manchester	Eastern end of Iowa 13 overlap
Delaware	Elk Township	284.102	457.218	Iowa 38 south – Greeley	
Dubuque	Luxemburg	300.344	483.357	US 52 / Iowa 136 south (Andre Street) – Dyersville, Guttenberg	Former western end of US 52 overlap
Dubuque	Sageville			CR C9Y (Sherrill Road) / Great River Road south	Western end of Great River Road overlap
Dubuque	Sageville	321.436	517.301	CR D10 (John Deere Road West)	Former Iowa 386
Dubuque	Sageville–Dubuque line	322.922	519.693	Northwest Arterial / CR Y35 (John Deere Road South)	Former Iowa 32 and Iowa 386
Dubuque	Dubuque	325.335	523.576	Rhomberg Avenue	Former US 61 / US 151
Dubuque	Dubuque	326.263	525.069	US 52 south / US 61 / US 151 / Great River Road	Former eastern end
1.000 mi = 1.609 km; 1.000 km = 0.621 mi: Closed/former; Concurrency terminus
