= Amsterdam Township, Hancock County, Iowa =

Amsterdam Township
- Township
- Location in Hancock County
- Coordinates: 42°57′06″N 93°47′34″W
- Country: United States
- State: Iowa
- County: Hancock

Area
  - Total: 35.84 sq mi (92.83 km^{2})
  - Land: 35.78 sq mi (92.68 km^{2})
  - Water: 0.058 sq mi (0.15 km^{2}) 0.16%
- Elevation: 1,168 ft (356 m)

Population (2000)
  - Total: 927
  - Density: 26/sq mi (10/km^{2})
- Time zone: UTC-6 (CST)
  - Summer (DST): UTC-5 (CDT)
- ZIP codes: 50430, 50447
- GNIS feature ID: 0467395

Amsterdam Township is one of sixteen townships in Hancock County, Iowa, United States. As of the 2000 census, its population was 927.

== Geography ==
According to the United States Census Bureau, Amsterdam Township covers an area of 35.84 square miles (92.83 square kilometers); of this, 35.78 square miles (92.68 square kilometers, 99.84 percent) is land and 0.06 square miles (0.15 square kilometers, 0.16 percent) is water.

=== Cities, towns, villages ===
- Kanawha

=== Adjacent townships ===
- Erin Township (north)
- Liberty Township (northeast)
- Twin Lake Township (east)
- Belmond Township, Wright County (southeast)
- Norway Township, Wright County (south)
- Boone Township, Wright County (southwest)
- Magor Township (west)
- Boone Township (northwest)

=== Cemeteries ===
The township contains these three cemeteries: New Amsterdam Township, Old Amsterdam and West Lake.

=== Major highways ===
- Iowa Highway 111

== School districts ==
- West Hancock Community School District

== Political districts ==
- Iowa's 4th congressional district
- State House District 12
- State Senate District 6
