= Twin Lake Township, Hancock County, Iowa =

Twin Lake Township
- Township
- Location in Hancock County
- Coordinates: 42°57′25″N 93°39′58″W
- Country: United States
- State: Iowa
- County: Hancock

Area
  - Total: 35.77 sq mi (92.64 km^{2})
  - Land: 35.32 sq mi (91.48 km^{2})
  - Water: 0.45 sq mi (1.16 km^{2}) 1.25%
- Elevation: 1,257 ft (383 m)

Population (2000)
  - Total: 197
  - Density: 5.7/sq mi (2.2/km^{2})
- Time zone: UTC-6 (CST)
  - Summer (DST): UTC-5 (CDT)
- ZIP codes: 50438, 50439, 50447
- GNIS feature ID: 0468801

Twin Lake Township is one of sixteen townships in Hancock County, Iowa, USA. As of the 2000 census, its population was 197.

== History ==
Twin Lake Township was organized in 1882. It was named from two lakes in the southern part of the township.

== Geography ==
According to the United States Census Bureau, Twin Lake Township covers an area of 35.77 square miles (92.64 square kilometers); of this, 35.32 square miles (91.48 square kilometers, 98.75 percent) is land and 0.45 square miles (1.16 square kilometers, 1.25 percent) is water.

=== Cities, towns, villages ===
- Goodell (west portion)

=== Adjacent townships ===
- Liberty Township (north)
- Ell Township (northeast)
- Avery Township (east)
- Pleasant Township, Wright County (southeast)
- Belmond Township, Wright County (south)
- Norway Township, Wright County (southwest)
- Amsterdam Township (west)
- Erin Township (northwest)

=== Major highways ===
- U.S. Route 69

== School districts ==
- Belmond–Klemme Community School District
- West Hancock Community School District

== Political districts ==
- Iowa's 4th congressional district
- State House District 12
- State Senate District 6
