= Magor Township, Hancock County, Iowa =

Magor Township
- Township
- Location in Hancock County
- Coordinates: 42°56′59″N 93°55′10″W
- Country: United States
- State: Iowa
- County: Hancock

Area
  - Total: 36.12 sq mi (93.54 km^{2})
  - Land: 36.12 sq mi (93.54 km^{2})
  - Water: 0 sq mi (0 km^{2}) 0%
- Elevation: 1,161 ft (354 m)

Population (2000)
  - Total: 450
  - Density: 12/sq mi (4.8/km^{2})
- Time zone: UTC-6 (CST)
  - Summer (DST): UTC-5 (CDT)
- ZIP codes: 50430, 50447
- GNIS feature ID: 0468331

Magor Township is one of sixteen townships in Hancock County, Iowa, USA. As of the 2000 census, its population was 450.

== History ==
Magor Township was founded in 1878. It was named for Henry Magor, a pioneer settler.

== Geography ==
According to the United States Census Bureau, Magor Township covers an area of 36.12 square miles (93.54 square kilometers).

=== Cities, towns, villages ===
- Corwith (south three-quarters)

=== Unincorporated towns ===
- Denhart at 42.966078°N 93.872168°W

(This list is based on USGS data and may include former settlements.)

=== Adjacent townships ===
- Boone Township (north)
- Erin Township (northeast)
- Amsterdam Township (east)
- Norway Township, Wright County (southeast)
- Boone Township, Wright County (south)
- Vernon Township, Humboldt County (southwest)
- Lu Verne Township, Kossuth County (west)
- Prairie Township, Kossuth County (northwest)

=== Cemeteries ===
The township contains these three cemeteries: Corwith, Magor Township and Saint Marys.

== School districts ==
- Corwith–Wesley Community School District
- West Hancock Community School District

== Political districts ==
- Iowa's 4th congressional district
- State House District 11
- State Senate District 6
