= Iowa Highway 6 =

Iowa Highway 6 may refer to one of the following highways:

- U.S. Route 6
- Iowa Primary Road No. 6, now part of US 30
- Iowa Highway 6 (1926–1931), became Iowa Highway 60 (renumbered as Iowa 5 and Iowa 17)
