= Boone Township, Hancock County, Iowa =

Boone Township
- Township
- Location in Hancock County
- Coordinates: 43°02′20″N 93°54′51″W
- Country: United States
- State: Iowa
- County: Hancock

Area
  - Total: 36.48 sq mi (94.48 km^{2})
  - Land: 36.48 sq mi (94.48 km^{2})
  - Water: 0 sq mi (0 km^{2}) 0%
- Elevation: 1,178 ft (359 m)

Population (2000)
  - Total: 227
  - Density: 6.2/sq mi (2.4/km^{2})
- Time zone: UTC-6 (CST)
  - Summer (DST): UTC-5 (CDT)
- ZIP codes: 50423, 50430, 50447, 50483
- GNIS feature ID: 0467475

Boone Township is one of sixteen townships in Hancock County, Iowa, United States. As of the 2000 census, its population was 227.

== History ==
Boone Township was organized in 1880.

== Geography ==
According to the United States Census Bureau, Boone Township covers an area of 36.48 square miles (94.48 square kilometers).

=== Cities, towns, villages ===
- Corwith (north edge)

=== Unincorporated towns ===
- Stilson at 43.038298°N 93.885225°W

(This list is based on USGS data and may include former settlements.)

=== Adjacent townships ===
- Orthel Township (north)
- Britt Township (northeast)
- Erin Township (east)
- Amsterdam Township (southeast)
- Magor Township (south)
- Lu Verne Township, Kossuth County (southwest)
- Prairie Township, Kossuth County (west)
- Wesley Township, Kossuth County (northwest)

=== Cemeteries ===
The township contains Boone Township Cemetery.

=== Airports and landing strips ===
- Newbrough Airport

== School districts ==
- Corwith–Wesley Community School District
- West Hancock Community School District

== Political districts ==
- Iowa's 4th congressional district
- State House District 11
- State Senate District 6
