= Holmes, Iowa =

- Unincorporated community
- Location within Iowa
- Coordinates: 42°44′21″N 93°50′02″W
- Country: United States
- State: Iowa
- County: Wright
- Elevation: 1,148 ft (350 m)
- Time zone: UTC-6 (Central (CST))
  - Summer (DST): UTC-5 (CDT)
- Area code: 515
- GNIS feature ID: 457564

Holmes is an unincorporated community and de facto ghost town in Lake Township, Wright County, Iowa, United States. Holmes is located along County Highway R33, 5 miles (8.0 km) west of Clarion.

== History ==
Founded in the 1800s, Holmes' population was 62 in 1902, and 154 in 1925. The population was 46 in 1940.

== Education ==
Holmes is a part of the Clarion–Goldfield–Dows Community School District. It was in the Clarion–Goldfield Community School District, until July 1, 2014, when it merged into the current district.
