= Cornelia, Iowa =

- Unincorporated community
- Location within Iowa Location within the United States
- Coordinates: 42°47′24″N 93°41′00″W
- Country: United States
- State: Iowa
- County: Wright
- Elevation: 1,227 ft (374 m)
- Time zone: UTC-6 (Central (CST))
  - Summer (DST): UTC-5 (CDT)
- Area code: 515
- GNIS feature ID: 455630

Cornelia is an unincorporated community and de facto ghost town in Grant Township, Wright County, Iowa, United States. Cornelia is located along County Highway C25, 4.8 miles (7.7 km) north-northeast of Clarion. Lake Cornelia State Park is in the community.

== History ==
Founded in the 1800s, Cornelia's population was just 3 in 1902, but had increased to 41 by 1925. By 1940, the population was 10.

== Education ==
Cornelia is a part of the Clarion–Goldfield–Dows Community School District. It was in the Clarion–Goldfield Community School District, until July 1, 2014, when it merged into the current district.
