= IA3 =

IA3 or similar may refer to:

- Ice Age: Dawn of the Dinosaurs, a 2009 3-D computer-animated adventure comedy film
- Iowa Highway 3, a state highway that runs from east to west across the state of Iowa
- Iowa's 3rd congressional district, a congressional district in the U.S. state of Iowa
