= Erin Township, Hancock County, Iowa =

Erin Township
- Township
- Location in Hancock County
- Coordinates: 43°02′26″N 93°47′38″W
- Country: United States
- State: Iowa
- County: Hancock

Area
  - Total: 36.37 sq mi (94.19 km^{2})
  - Land: 36.37 sq mi (94.19 km^{2})
  - Water: 0 sq mi (0 km^{2}) 0%
- Elevation: 1,188 ft (362 m)

Population (2000)
  - Total: 218
  - Density: 6.0/sq mi (2.3/km^{2})
- Time zone: UTC-6 (CST)
  - Summer (DST): UTC-5 (CDT)
- ZIP codes: 50423, 50447
- GNIS feature ID: 0467797

Erin Township is one of sixteen townships in Hancock County, Iowa, USA. As of the 2000 census its population was 218.

== History ==
Erin Township was organized in 1879. It was originally settled chiefly by Irish immigrants, who named it Erin, the poetic form of Ireland.

== Geography ==
According to the United States Census Bureau, Erin Township covers an area of 36.37 square miles (94.19 square kilometers).

=== Adjacent townships ===
- Britt Township (north)
- Garfield Township (northeast)
- Liberty Township (east)
- Twin Lake Township (southeast)
- Amsterdam Township (south)
- Magor Township (southwest)
- Boone Township (west)
- Orthel Township (northwest)

=== Cemeteries ===
The township contains Saint Patrick's Cemetery.

=== Major highways ===
- Iowa Highway 111

== School districts ==
- West Hancock Community School District

== Political districts ==
- Iowa's 4th congressional district
- State House District 11
- State Senate District 6
