= Blaine Township, Wright County, Iowa =

Township in Iowa, USA

Coordinates: 40.6963°N 91.7792°W

Blaine Township is a township in Wright County, Iowa, United States.

== Cities, towns, villages ==
- Dows
- Galt

== School districts ==
- Clarion-Goldfield-Dows Community School District
- Belmond-Klemme Community School District

== Notable Locations ==
- Bingham Park (south of Rowan)
- Iowa River
- Wright County Freedom Rock - Dows
- Dows Historic District

 - Quasdorf Blacksmith Museum
 - Rock Island Depot/Welcome Center
 - Fillmore Building/Dows Mercantile
 - Vernon No. 5 Schoolhouse Museum
 - Evans Prairie Home

- Dows Community Convention Center
- Dows Community Library
- Dows Swimming Pool & Campgrounds
- Dows Tiger Football Field & Track
- Dows City Park
- Dows School Playground

== Churches ==
- Dows First Lutheran Church
- Dows United Methodist Church
- Sovereign Grace Church - Dows (former First Presbyterian Church building)
- The Living God (former Dows Pharmacy building)

== Cemeteries ==
- Fairview Cemetery - Dows
- Galt Cemetery

== Gas Stations ==
- Casey's General Store - Dows

== Groceries ==
- Dows Community Grocery

== Political districts ==
- Iowa's 4th congressional district
- State House District 55
- State Senate District 28
