= Britt Township, Hancock County, Iowa =

Britt Township
- Township
- Location in Hancock County
- Coordinates: 43°07′15″N 93°47′53″W
- Country: United States
- State: Iowa
- County: Hancock

Area
  - Total: 35.44 sq mi (91.79 km^{2})
  - Land: 35.11 sq mi (90.94 km^{2})
  - Water: 0.33 sq mi (0.85 km^{2}) 0.93%
- Elevation: 1,204 ft (367 m)

Population (2000)
  - Total: 2,293
  - Density: 65/sq mi (25.2/km^{2})
- Time zone: UTC-6 (CST)
  - Summer (DST): UTC-5 (CDT)
- ZIP code: 50423
- GNIS feature ID: 0467489

Britt Township is one of sixteen townships in Hancock County, Iowa, United States. As of the 2000 census, its population was 2,293.

== History ==
Britt Township was founded in 1873.

== Geography ==
According to the United States Census Bureau, Britt Township covers an area of 35.44 square miles (91.79 square kilometers); of this, 35.11 square miles (90.94 square kilometers, 99.07 percent) is land and 0.33 square miles (0.85 square kilometers, 0.93 percent) is water.

=== Cities, towns, villages ===
- Britt

=== Adjacent townships ===
- Crystal Township (north)
- Madison Township (northeast)
- Garfield Township (east)
- Liberty Township (southeast)
- Erin Township (south)
- Boone Township (southwest)
- Orthel Township (west)
- Bingham Township (northwest)

=== Cemeteries ===
The township contains Evergreen Cemetery.

=== Major highways ===
- U.S. Route 18
- Iowa Highway 111

=== Landmarks ===
- Eagle Lake State Park

== School districts ==
- Garner–Hayfield–Ventura Community School District
- West Hancock Community School District

== Political districts ==
- Iowa's 4th congressional district
- State House District 11
- State Senate District 6
