= Wright County Courthouse (Iowa) =

- U.S. National Register of Historic Places
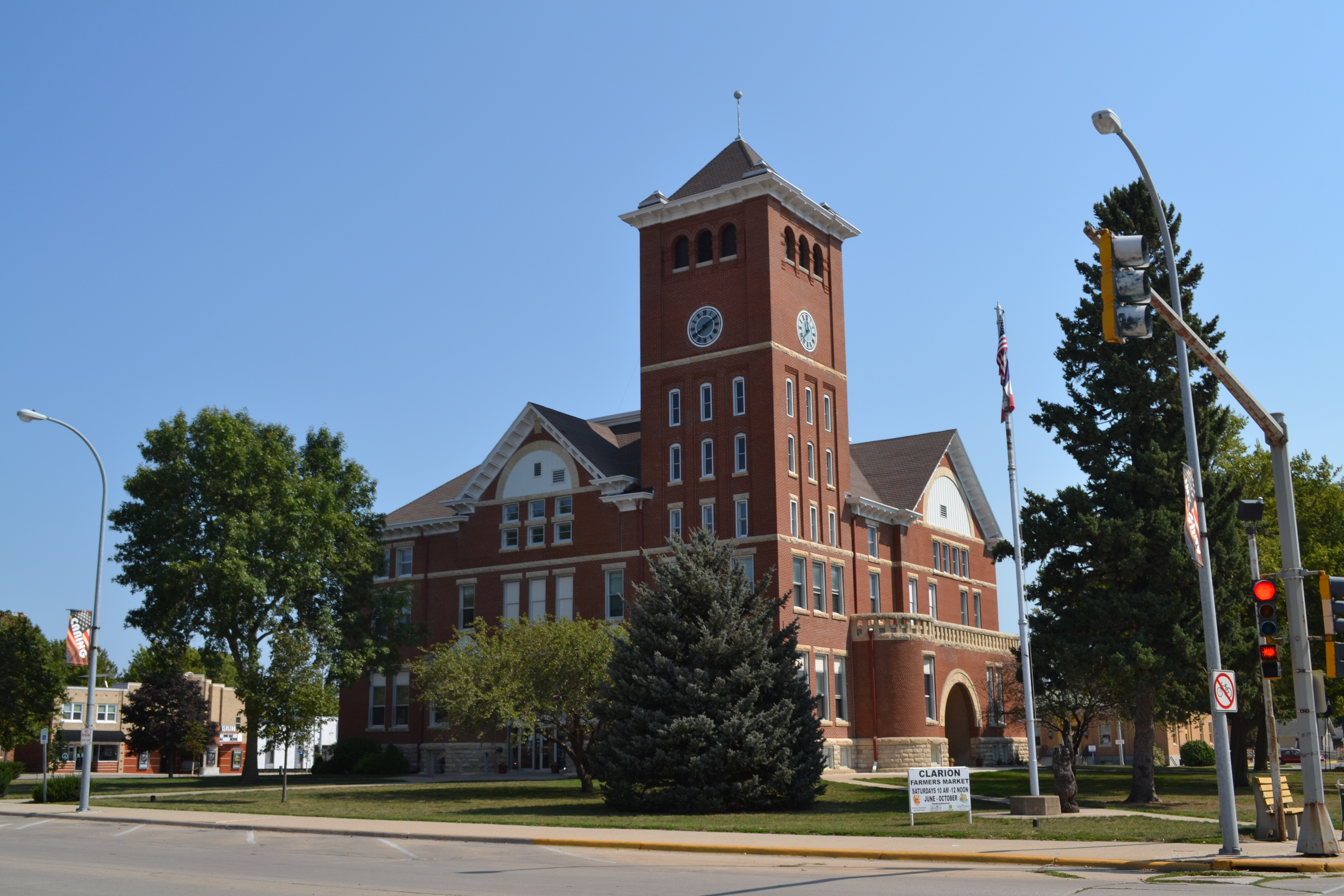

- Location within Iowa Location within the United States
- Interactive map showing the location for Wright County Courthouse
- Location: Central Ave. Clarion, Iowa
- Coordinates: 42°43′56″N 93°43′55″W
- Area: less than one acre
- Built: 1892
- Built by: E.D. Jones & Co.
- Architect: W.R. Parsons & Son
- Architectural style: Vernacular
- MPS: County Courthouses in Iowa TR
- NRHP reference No.: 81000277
- Added to NRHP: July 2, 1981

The Wright County Courthouse in Clarion, Iowa, United States was built in 1892. It was listed on the National Register of Historic Places in 1981 as a part of the County Courthouses in Iowa Thematic Resource. The courthouse was the fourth building the county has used for court functions and county administration.

== History ==
Wright County used a log cabin for its initial court sessions in 1855. A two-story frame building was the first proper courthouse the county used when the county seat was moved to Liberty. The county seat moved to Clarion in 1866 and another courthouse was constructed there. That building became a part of the Avondale Hotel after the present courthouse was built in 1892.

The present courthouse is a three-story building that was completed for $50,000 in 1892. It was designed by W.R. Parsons & Son, and built by E.D. Jones & Company. The building was extensively renovated in 1974.

== Architecture ==
The building exhibits several features that are unique among courthouses in Iowa. The Wright County Courthouse has a large polygonal projection at the rear of the building. Its front entrance is recessed within a single-story projecting pavilion, which features a stone roof, balustrade and a semicircular bay on one side. There are similar semicircular bays that flank the site entrance. The courthouse also has a clock tower that rises above the building's multi-gabled roof. The significance of the courthouse is derived from its association with county government, and the political power and prestige of Clarion as the county seat.
