= Thrall, Iowa =

Ghost town in Iowa, US

Coordinates: 42.7614°N 93.9258°W

Thrall is a ghost town in Wright County, in the U.S. state of Iowa.

== History ==
A post office called Thrall was established in 1882, and remained in operation until it was discontinued in 1907. Thrall was platted in 1886. It was named for W. A. Thrall, a railroad official.
