= Clarion–Goldfield Community School District =

Former school district in Iowa

Clarion–Goldfield Community School District was a school district headquartered in Clarion, Iowa. It covered 254 square miles (660 km^{2}) of area, mostly in Wright County with some portions in the counties in Hancock and Humboldt. In its service area were Clarion, Galt, and Goldfield, as well as the unincorporated communities of Cornelia and Holmes.

== History ==
The district was established on July 1, 1993, by the merger of the Clarion Community School District and the Goldfield Community School District.

In 2005, it began sharing programs and employees with the Dows Community School District. The two school districts sought a merger because of declining enrollments and because a State of Iowa funding program for small schools was to be terminated in 2013. The election for whether the districts should be merged was scheduled for September 10, 2013; 98% of Clarion-Goldfield voters and 85% of the Dows voters approved of the merger. On July 1, 2014, they merged into the Clarion–Goldfield–Dows Community School District.

The Clarion–Goldfield and Dows school districts began a whole grade sharing agreement in 2005. Under the agreement Dows maintained their own elementary school and sent students in grades 6-12 to Clarion. The districts shared administration and several staff members. Goldfield Elementary closed in 2008. At the time there were 43 students, a decline from previous years. The board of trustees decided to close the school when the number of students from the attendance boundary of the Goldfield school had decreased, even though the school board increased the size of the school's attendance boundary. In 2014, the districts consolidated into one district and the Dows Elementary School was closed. The Dows School building was sold to be used to warehouse Pioneer Seed. The playground and athletic complex were gifted to the City of Dows.

In 1981, Clarion and Goldfield began a whole grade sharing agreement that included sharing the high school. This was expanded to include the middle school in 1986. In 1985, the board of trustees voted to send all middle school high school students to a school in Clarion, and that Clarion would provide relevant after-school and extracurricular activities. Four board members voted in favor, and one voted against. The Eagle Grove Eagle reported that there had been "considerable objection from the public and some impassioned please by residents" asking the trustees to decide differently. The two districts passed a consolidation (99% and 89% approval) to merge the two districts into the Clarion–Goldfield Community School District. The Goldfield building continued to house elementary classes until closing in 2008. The Goldfield building continues to be used for athletic events and practices and is available to rent for events.

The district territory also saw expansion in when Clarion and Galt consolidated in the 1960s. In 1987, the Boone Valley School District of Renwick dissolved, with the former district being divided between Humboldt and Clarion/Goldfield. In 2015, Corwith–Wesley dissolved with portions of the district being split between Algona/LuVerne, West Hancock, and Clarion–Goldfield–Dows.

Clarion–Goldfield–Dows High School was built in 1969. A weight room was built in 2003 by the Sports Boosters. In 2004 an addition and renovation project was completed building an addition to the north and a new art room, pottery room, business room, 2 computer labs, wrestling room, 4 locker rooms, and geothermal heating and cooling to the north northwest half of the facility. In 2007 another project was completed that included a south addition and extensive renovations to create new and renovated facilities for a library media center, ICN room, computer lab, chemistry/physics lab, renovated biology lab, 7 new classrooms, expanded and renovated offices, new main entrance, and a hallway/entrance to the east. The project included extensive renovations and new geothermal heating and cooling to the southeastern portion of the building. Plans for the future include a 650-seat auditorium addition or a possible auxiliary gym. In 2014 the parking lot was redone as well.

The Clarion–Goldfield–Dows Elementary and Middle School complex began with a 3-story high school building built in 1913, located on what is now the circle drive. In 1936, the 2-story elementary school was built as it stands today. In the late 1950s a building project was completed that included a northwest addition to the elementary school, an east addition to the elementary school, and what is now the middle school was built as a north addition to the high school that also connected the two buildings into one facility. The high school was moved to the new building in Northeast Clarion in 1971. The facility then became a P/K–8 facility. In 1993, the 1913 portion of the building was demolished, the middle school was capped and a new front entrance and circle drive were built. An addition was built to the north of the elementary school including a multipurpose room (gymnasium/cafeteria), library media center, ICN room, 2 computer labs, and additional classrooms. The 1936 elementary building and east addition was extensively renovated at this time. In 2002 a north addition was built to the middle school, adding 4 additional classrooms. In 2007, an extensive renovation project was completed to the middle school and northwest elementary addition that also included a small addition to the southwest, near the front entrance. In 2003, a new playground was completed. Plans are underway for a potential addition to the north side of the multipurpose room that will include additional locker rooms and a baseball/softball hitting facility, which will also serve as a tornado and emergency shelter for the school and community. The football field and track facilities are located east of the elementary/middle school, which were built in 1938. The football stadium is one of the only ones in Iowa with a covered stadium.

The Clarion–Goldfield–Dows continues to partner with area school districts to provide additional opportunities to students. Clarion–Goldfield–Dows and CAL (Latimer) are sharing high school football and cross country in 2015. Clarion–Goldfield–Dows and Eagle Grove share a transportation director, vocational agriculture instructor, and juvenile court liaison. Additionally, Clarion–Goldfield–Dows partners with Iowa Central Community College to offer a wide range of dual credit college courses, many of which are offered to students at no cost and are taught by high school faculty.

Clarion–Goldfield–Dows is a Class 2A school in the North Central Conference (Iowa) that includes Algona, Clarion–Goldfield–Dows, Clear Lake, Hampton-Dumont, Humboldt, Iowa Falls-Alden, St. Edmond, and Webster City. School colors are red and black and the mascot is the Cowboys/Cowgirls. The school song is sung to the tune of Illinois Loyalty.
