= Olaf, Iowa =

- Unincorporated community
- Location within Iowa
- Coordinates: 42°53′12″N 93°43′29″W
- Country: United States
- State: Iowa
- County: Wright
- Elevation: 1,234 ft (376 m)
- Time zone: UTC-6 (Central (CST))
  - Summer (DST): UTC-5 (CDT)
- Area code: 515
- GNIS feature ID: 464680

Olaf is an unincorporated community and de facto ghost town in Wright County, Iowa, United States.

== History ==
Olaf's population was 57 in 1902, and 25 in 1925. The population was 50 in 1940.
