= Vernon Township, Wright County, Iowa =

Township in Iowa, USA

Coordinates: 42°36′N 93°34′W

Vernon Township is a township in Wright County, Iowa.
