= Clarion–Goldfield–Dows Community School District =

Public school district in Iowa, United States

Coordinates: 42.731491°N 93.731909°W

Address
- 319 Third Street NE Clarion; Iowa Wright, Franklin, Humboldt and Hancock counties 50525; United States
- Coordinates: 42.731491, -93.731909

District information
- Type: Public school district
- Motto: "Preparing Students Today For Tomorrow"
- Grades: Prep-K–12
- Established: 1913
- Superintendent: Joseph Nelson
- Schools: 3
- Budget: $17,112,000 (2020-21)
- NCES District ID: 1907380

Students and staff
- Students: 1071 (2022-23)
- Teachers: 69.52 FTE
- Staff: 78.95 FTE
- Student–teacher ratio: 15.41
- Athletic conference: North Central Conference
- District mascot: Cowboys and Cowgirls
- Colors: Red and Black

Other information
- Website: www.clargold.org

The Clarion–Goldfield–Dows Community School District is a rural public school district headquartered in Clarion, Iowa. The school district is mostly in Wright County, with portions of the district extending into Franklin, Humboldt and Hancock counties. The district serves the communities of Clarion, Dows, Galt and Goldfield, as well as the unincorporated communities of Cornelia and Holmes. Schools within the district include an elementary school (P/K–5), a middle school (6–8), and a high school (9–12) all located in Clarion.

== History ==
The Clarion–Goldfield Community School District and the Dows Community School District consolidated into the Clarion–Goldfield–Dows CSD on July 1, 2014. The two school districts sought a merger because of declining enrollments and because a State of Iowa funding program for small schools was to be terminated in 2013. The election for whether the districts should be merged was scheduled for September 10, 2013; 98% of Clarion–Goldfield voters and 85% of the Dows voters approved of the merger.

The Clarion–Goldfield–Dows Elementary and Middle School complex began with a 3-story high school building built in 1913, located on what is now the circle drive. In 1937, the two-story elementary school was built as it stands today. In the late 1950s, two additions were added to the elementary school, on the east and northwest sides, and a middle school was built as a north addition to the high school. The high school was moved to a new building in northeast Clarion in 1971. The old building became a P/K–8 facility.

In 1993, the 1913 portion of the building was demolished, the middle school was capped, and a new front entrance was built. An addition was built to the north of the elementary school including a multipurpose room (gymnasium/cafeteria), library media center, and additional classrooms. The 1937 elementary building and east addition was extensively renovated at that time. In 2002, a north addition was built to the middle school, adding four additional classrooms. In 2002, four classrooms were added to the north side of the middle school. Additional parking spaces and a sport court were completed at this time as well. In 2007, an extensive renovation project was completed to the middle school and northwest elementary addition that also included a small addition to the southwest, near the front entrance. In 2003, a new playground was completed.

Clarion–Goldfield–Dows High School was built in 1969. A new weight room was built in 2003 by the Sports Boosters. In 2004, an addition and renovation project was completed, building an addition to the north of the facility. In 2007, a south addition was added and extensive renovations were constructed.

On July 1, 2015, the Corwith–Wesley Community School District dissolved, with a portion of the district being taken by Clarion–Goldfield–Dows CSD.

== Enrollment ==
In September 2019, the Clarion–Goldfield–Dows CSD had a K–12 certified enrollment of 973 students.

Year	Enrollment
2014–15	954
2015–16	951
2016–17	967
2017–18	944
2018–19	943
2019–20	973

== Athletics ==
The Clarion–Goldfield–Dows mascot is the Cowboys/Cowgirls and the school colors are red and black. The school song is sung to the tune of Illinois Loyalty. The Cowboys and Cowgirls compete in the North Central Conference in the following sports:

- Cross Country
- Football
- Volleyball
- Basketball
- Wrestling
  - 3-time State Champions (1938, 1947, 1983)
  - 2-time State Duals Champions (2014 (as Clarion-Goldfield), 2015)
- Golf
  - Boys' 1988 Class 2A State Champions
- Track & Field
  - Boys' 2-time Class A State Champions (1959, 1961)
- Baseball
- Softball

Clarion–Goldfield–Dows and CAL Community School District schools partnered for three years with shared football and cross country programs before CAL began whole grade sharing with Hampton-Dumont in 2018.

== Predecessor Districts ==
=== Dows Community School District ===
The Dows Community School District, established in 1914, served the community of Dows, Iowa for 100 years. It served as a full K–12 school system until the last class graduated in 1998. The school building was built in 1914 and additions were built in 1935, 1954, 1961 and 1980, with additional renovations completed in the 1980s and 1990s. In 1963, Dows recorded its largest enrollment of 532 students in K–12, 50 in kindergarten alone. Throughout the 1980s and 1990s, enrollment declined. In the fall of 1998, a 2-way whole grade sharing agreement began with CAL Community School District of Latimer, Iowa. The shared high school was at CAL, the shared middle school (6–8) was at Dows, and both districts maintained their own separate elementary schools. This agreement continued for seven years. Beginning in 2005–06, Dows ended the agreement with CAL and began a 1-way whole grade sharing agreement with Clarion–Goldfield. Dows maintained a P/K–5 elementary school and shared numerous administration, faculty and staff positions. In September 2013, voters of both districts approved consolidation into a single district. The Dows School was closed in the spring of 2014, in its centennial year of operation. An all-school reunion was held at Dows Corn Days in August 2014. The district became part of the Clarion–Goldfield–Dows Community School District with all students attending classes and activities in Clarion in the fall of 2014. The Dows School building was sold in June 2014 to warehouse seed for Pioneer and forklifts. The playground and football/baseball complex was gifted to the City of Dows.

=== Goldfield Community School District ===
In 1981, Clarion and Goldfield began a whole grade sharing agreement that included sharing the high school, this was expanded to include the middle school in 1986. The two districts passed a consolidation to merge the two districts into the Clarion–Goldfield Community School District in 1993. The Goldfield building continued to house elementary classes until closing in 2008. The Goldfield building continues to be used for athletic events and practices, and is available to rent for events. It was gifted to the City of Goldfield in 2017. A company is interested in developing the building into apartments.

=== Boone Valley Community School District dissolution ===
The Boone Valley Community School District of Renwick, Iowa, opted to dissolve the district, instead of consolidating with a single district. The land in the district was mostly split between Humboldt and Clarion in 1988.

== Academic performance ==
By 2018, the State of Iowa ranked the elementary school "acceptable" and the secondary schools "commendable".

== See also ==
- List of school districts in Iowa
- List of high schools in Iowa
