= Orthel Township, Hancock County, Iowa =

Orthel Township
- Township
- Location in Hancock County
- Coordinates: 43°07′39″N 93°54′49″W
- Country: United States
- State: Iowa
- County: Hancock

Area
  - Total: 35.84 sq mi (92.82 km^{2})
  - Land: 35.77 sq mi (92.64 km^{2})
  - Water: 0.066 sq mi (0.17 km^{2}) 0.18%
- Elevation: 1,250 ft (381 m)

Population (2000)
  - Total: 247
  - Density: 7.0/sq mi (2.7/km^{2})
- Time zone: UTC-6 (CST)
  - Summer (DST): UTC-5 (CDT)
- ZIP codes: 50423, 50483
- GNIS feature ID: 0468475

Orthel Township is one of sixteen townships in Hancock County, Iowa, USA. As of the 2000 census, its population was 247.

== History ==
Orthel Township was founded in 1882.

== Geography ==
According to the United States Census Bureau, Orthel Township covers an area of 35.84 square miles (92.82 square kilometers); of this, 35.77 square miles (92.64 square kilometers, 99.81 percent) is land and 0.07 square miles (0.17 square kilometers, 0.18 percent) is water.

=== Unincorporated towns ===
- Hutchins at 43.09163°N 93.881059°W

(This list is based on USGS data and may include former settlements.)

=== Adjacent townships ===
- Bingham Township (north)
- Crystal Township (northeast)
- Britt Township (east)
- Erin Township (southeast)
- Boone Township (south)
- Prairie Township, Kossuth County (southwest)
- Wesley Township, Kossuth County (west)
- Buffalo Township, Kossuth County (northwest)

=== Cemeteries ===
The township contains Orthel Township Cemetery.

=== Major highways ===
- U.S. Route 18

=== Airports and landing strips ===
- Wesley Landing Strip

== School districts ==
- Corwith–Wesley Community School District
- West Hancock Community School District
- Woden–Crystal Lake Community School District

== Political districts ==
- Iowa's 4th congressional district
- State House District 11
- State Senate District 6
