= Woolstock Township, Wright County, Iowa =

Township in Iowa, USA

Coordinates: 42.6001°N 93.7931°W

Woolstock Township is a township in Wright County, Iowa, United States.
