= Dayton Township, Wright County, Iowa =

Township in Iowa, USA

Coordinates: 42°42′N 93°48′W

Dayton Township is a township in Wright County, Iowa, United States.
