= Denhart, Iowa =

- Unincorporated community
- Location within Iowa
- Coordinates: 42°57′58″N 93°52′20″W
- Country: United States
- State: Iowa
- County: Hancock
- Elevation: 1,168 ft (356 m)
- Time zone: UTC-6 (Central (CST))
  - Summer (DST): UTC-5 (CDT)
- Area code: 641
- GNIS feature ID: 464516

Denhart is an unincorporated community in Magor Township, Hancock County, Iowa, United States. Denhart is located along County Highway R26, 4.4 miles (7.1 km) west-northwest of Kanawha.

== History ==
Denhart's population was just 10 in 1925.
