= Wall Lake Township, Wright County, Iowa =

Township in Iowa, USA

Coordinates: 42°36′N 93°41′W

Wall Lake Township is a township in Wright County, Iowa, United States.
