= Galt, Iowa =

- City
- Location of Galt, Iowa
- Coordinates: 42°41′37″N 93°36′17″W
- Country: USA
- State: Iowa
- County: Wright

Area
  - Total: 0.56 sq mi (1.44 km^{2})
  - Land: 0.56 sq mi (1.44 km^{2})
  - Water: 0 sq mi (0.00 km^{2})
- Elevation: 1,207 ft (368 m)

Population (2020)
  - Total: 26
  - Density: 46.8/sq mi (18.08/km^{2})
- Time zone: UTC-6 (Central (CST))
  - Summer (DST): UTC-5 (CDT)
- ZIP code: 50101
- Area code: 641
- FIPS code: 19-29550
- GNIS feature ID: 2394845

Galt is a city in Wright County, Iowa, United States. The population was 26 at the time of the 2020 census.

== Geography ==
According to the United States Census Bureau, the city has a total area of 0.54 square miles (1.40 km^{2}), all land.

== Demographics ==
Historical populations
| Year | Pop. | ±% |
|---|---|---|
| 1920 | 134 | — |
| 1930 | 167 | +24.6% |
| 1940 | 156 | −6.6% |
| 1950 | 117 | −25.0% |
| 1960 | 75 | −35.9% |
| 1970 | 50 | −33.3% |
| 1980 | 60 | +20.0% |
| 1990 | 43 | −28.3% |
| 2000 | 30 | −30.2% |
| 2010 | 32 | +6.7% |
| 2020 | 26 | −18.8% |
Source:"U.S. Census website". United States Census Bureau. and Iowa Data Center; Source: U.S. Decennial Census

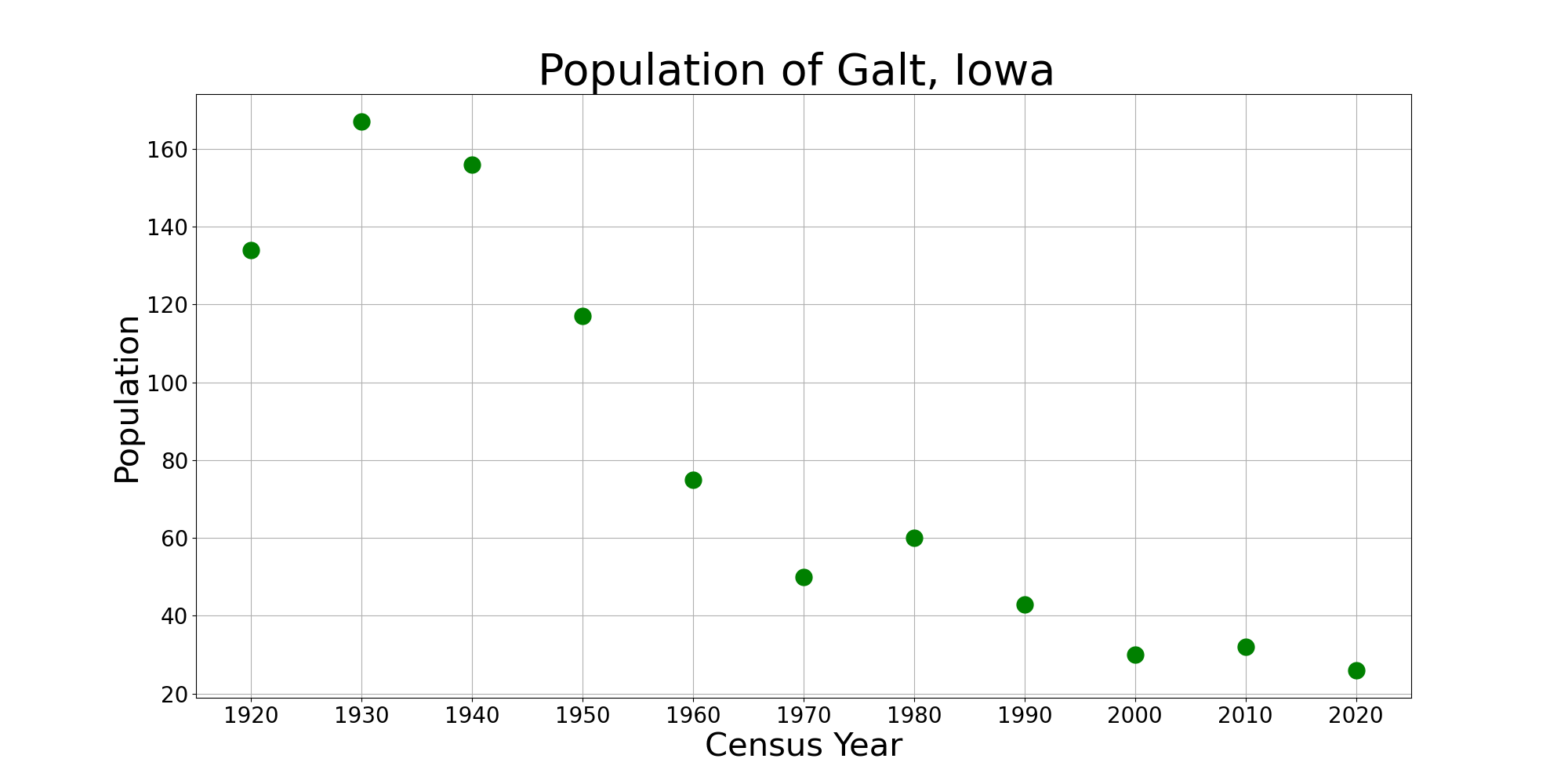
The population of Galt, Iowa from US census data

=== 2020 census ===
As of the census of 2020, there were 26 people, 8 households, and 6 families residing in the city. The population density was 46.8 inhabitants per square mile (18.1/km^{2}). There were 14 housing units at an average density of 25.2 per square mile (9.7/km^{2}). The racial makeup of the city was 80.8% White, 3.8% Black or African American, 0.0% Native American, 3.8% Asian, 0.0% Pacific Islander, 0.0% from other races and 11.5% from two or more races. Hispanic or Latino persons of any race comprised 15.4% of the population.

Of the 8 households, 50.0% of which had children under the age of 18 living with them, 37.5% were married couples living together, 37.5% were cohabitating couples, 12.5% had a female householder with no spouse or partner present and 12.5% had a male householder with no spouse or partner present. 25.0% of all households were non-families. 12.5% of all households were made up of individuals, 12.5% had someone living alone who was 65 years old or older.

The median age in the city was 53.0 years. 19.2% of the residents were under the age of 20; 3.8% were between the ages of 20 and 24; 15.4% were from 25 and 44; 26.9% were from 45 and 64; and 34.6% were 65 years of age or older. The gender makeup of the city was 57.7% male and 42.3% female.

=== 2010 census ===
As of the census of 2010, there were 32 people, 15 households, and 10 families living in the city. The population density was 59.3 inhabitants per square mile (22.9/km^{2}). There were 17 housing units at an average density of 31.5 per square mile (12.2/km^{2}). The racial makeup of the city was 100.0% White. Hispanic or Latino of any race were 21.9% of the population.

There were 15 households, of which 26.7% had children under the age of 18 living with them, 60.0% were married couples living together, 6.7% had a female householder with no husband present, and 33.3% were non-families. 33.3% of all households were made up of individuals, and 6.7% had someone living alone who was 65 years of age or older. The average household size was 2.13 and the average family size was 2.50.

The median age in the city was 50.5 years. 21.9% of residents were under the age of 18; 3.2% were between the ages of 18 and 24; 22% were from 25 to 44; 31.3% were from 45 to 64; and 21.9% were 65 years of age or older. The gender makeup of the city was 56.3% male and 43.8% female.

=== 2000 census ===
As of the census of 2000, there were 30 people, 15 households, and 12 families living in the city. The population density was 55.8 inhabitants per square mile (21.5/km^{2}). There were 17 housing units at an average density of 31.6 per square mile (12.2/km^{2}). The racial makeup of the city was 100.00% White.

There were 15 households, out of which 13.3% had children under the age of 18 living with them, 80.0% were married couples living together, and 20.0% were non-families. 20.0% of all households were made up of individuals, and 13.3% had someone living alone who was 65 years of age or older. The average household size was 2.00 and the average family size was 2.25.

Age spread: 6.7% under the age of 18, 10.0% from 25 to 44, 53.3% from 45 to 64, and 30.0% who were 65 years of age or older. The median age was 54 years. For every 100 females, there were 76.5 males. For every 100 females age 18 and over, there were 75.0 males.

The median income for a household in the city was $30,625, and the median income for a family was $31,875. Males had a median income of $20,833 versus $18,750 for females. The per capita income for the city was $15,668. None of the population and none of the families were below the poverty line.

== Education ==
Galt is a part of the Clarion–Goldfield–Dows Community School District. It was in the Clarion–Goldfield Community School District until July 1, 2014, when it merged into the current district.

== See also ==
- Wright County Egg
