= Wright County, Iowa =

County in Iowa, United States

- County
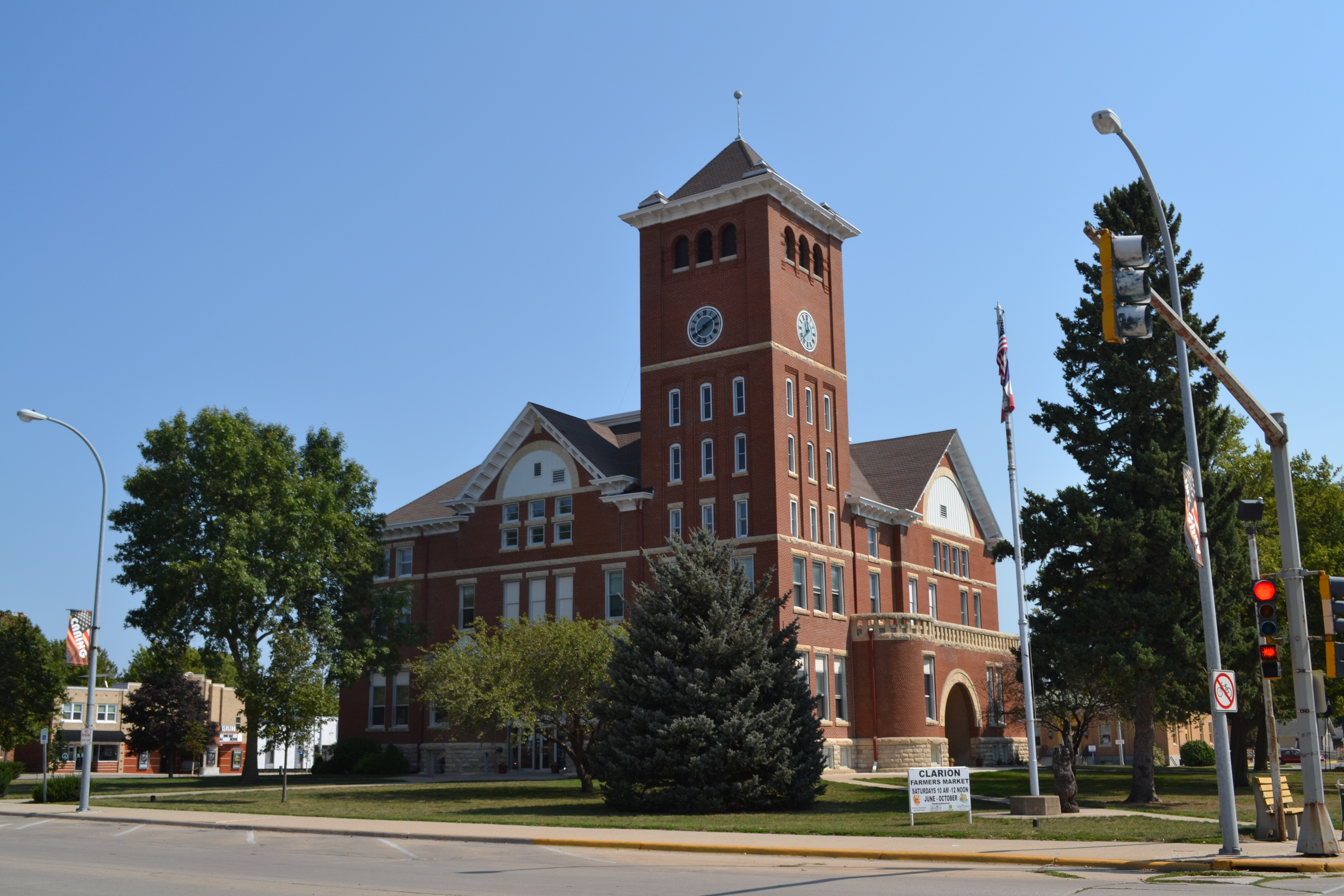
- The Wright County Courthouse in Clarion

- Location within the U.S. state of Iowa
- Coordinates: 42°43′59″N 93°44′08″W
- Country: United States
- State: Iowa
- Founded: January 15, 1851
- Named for: Silas Wright
- Seat: Clarion
- Largest city: Eagle Grove

Area
  - Total: 582 sq mi (1,510 km^{2})
  - Land: 580 sq mi (1,500 km^{2})
  - Water: 1.8 sq mi (4.7 km^{2}) 0.3%

Population (2020)
  - Total: 12,943
  - Estimate (2025): 12,801 ▼
  - Density: 22/sq mi (8.6/km^{2})
- Time zone: UTC−6 (Central)
  - Summer (DST): UTC−5 (CDT)
- Congressional district: 4th
- Website: wrightcounty.iowa.gov
- Iowa county number 99

Wright County is a county in the U.S. state of Iowa. As of the 2020 census, the population was 12,943. The county seat is Clarion. The county organization became effective in January 1851, and is believed to be named either after Silas Wright, a governor of New York, or Joseph Albert Wright, a governor of Indiana.

== Geography ==
According to the United States Census Bureau, the county has an area of 582 square miles (1,510 km^{2}), of which 580 square miles (1,500 km^{2}) is land and 1.8 square miles (4.7 km^{2}) (0.3%) is covered by water. The terrain is generally undulating. The county is intersected by the Boone and Iowa Rivers

=== Major highways ===
- Interstate 35
- U.S. Highway 69
- Iowa Highway 3
- Iowa Highway 17

=== Adjacent counties ===
- Hancock County - north
- Cerro Gordo County - northeast
- Franklin County - east
- Hardin County - southeast
- Hamilton County - south
- Webster County - southwest
- Humboldt County - west
- Kossuth County - northwest

== Demographics ==
Historical population
Census	Pop.	Note	%±
1870	2,392		—
1880	5,062		111.6%
1890	12,057		138.2%
1900	18,227		51.2%
1910	17,951		−1.5%
1920	20,348		13.4%
1930	20,216		−0.6%
1940	20,038		−0.9%
1950	19,652		−1.9%
1960	19,447		−1.0%
1970	17,294		−11.1%
1980	16,319		−5.6%
1990	14,269		−12.6%
2000	14,334		0.5%
2010	13,229		−7.7%
2020	12,943		−2.2%
2025 (est.)	12,801	▼	−1.1%
U.S. Decennial Census; 1790–1960 1900–1990; 1990–2000 2010–2020

=== 2020 census ===
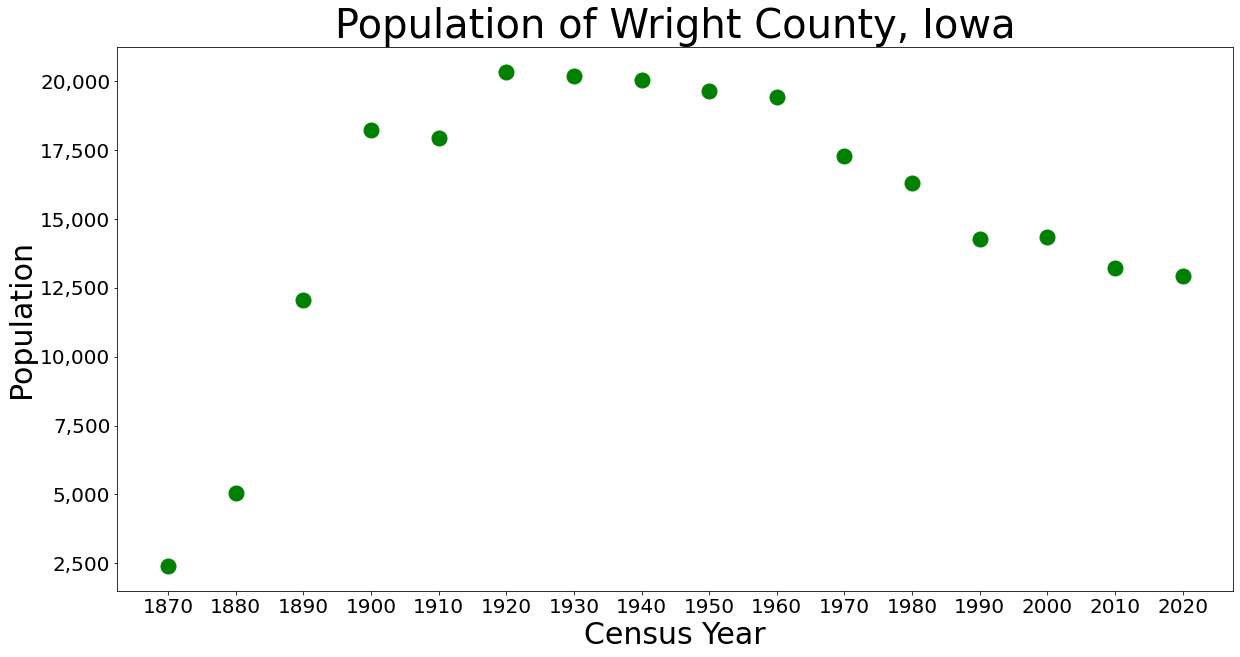
Population of Wright County from the U.S. census data

As of the 2020 census, the county had a population of 12,943, giving a population density of 22.2/sq mi (8.6/km^{2}).

The median age was 41.0 years. 24.8% of residents were under the age of 18 and 21.7% of residents were 65 years of age or older. For every 100 females there were 99.3 males, and for every 100 females age 18 and over there were 97.2 males age 18 and over.

The racial makeup of the county was 81.4% White, 0.6% Black or African American, 0.7% American Indian and Alaska Native, 0.5% Asian, 0.1% Native Hawaiian and Pacific Islander, 10.2% from some other race, and 6.5% from two or more races. Hispanic or Latino residents of any race comprised 18.5% of the population. Approximately 93.5% of residents reported being of one race.

Wright County Racial Composition
Race	Number	Percent
White (NH)	10,107	78.1%
Black or African American (NH)	73	0.6%
Native American (NH)	15	0.12%
Asian (NH)	67	0.52%
Pacific Islander (NH)	8	0.06%
Other/Mixed (NH)	279	2.2%
Hispanic or Latino	2,394	18.5%

Less than 0.1% of residents lived in urban areas, while 100.0% lived in rural areas.

There were 5,404 households in the county, of which 27.8% had children under the age of 18 living in them. Of all households, 48.6% were married-couple households, 20.1% were households with a male householder and no spouse or partner present, and 24.7% were households with a female householder and no spouse or partner present. About 31.0% of all households were made up of individuals and 15.9% had someone living alone who was 65 years of age or older. Of the 6,260 housing units, 5,404 were occupied and 13.7% were vacant. Among occupied housing units, 71.4% were owner-occupied and 28.6% were renter-occupied. The homeowner vacancy rate was 2.2% and the rental vacancy rate was 11.9%.

=== 2010 census ===
As of the 2010 census recorded a population of 13,229 in the county, with a population density of 22.8/sq mi (8.8/km^{2}). There were 6,529 housing units, of which 5,625 were occupied.

=== 2000 census ===
As of the 2000 census, there were 14,334 people, 5,940 households, and 3,938 families residing in the county. The population density was 25 people per square mile (9.7 people/km^{2}). There were 6,559 housing units at an average density of 11 units per square mile (4.2 units/km^{2}). The racial makeup of the county was 95.93% White, 0.17% Black or African American, 0.18% Native American, 0.20% Asian, 2.90% from other races, and 0.63% from two or more races. 4.93% of the population were Hispanic or Latino of any race.

There were 5,940 households, out of which 28.40% had children under the age of 18 living with them, 57.30% were married couples living together, 6.20% had a female householder with no husband present, and 33.70% were non-families. 30.20% of all households were made up of individuals, and 16.30% had someone living alone who was 65 years of age or older. The average household size was 2.36 and the average family size was 2.92.

In the county, the population was spread out, with 24.50% under the age of 18, 6.50% from 18 to 24, 24.50% from 25 to 44, 23.30% from 45 to 64, and 21.20% who were 65 years of age or older. The median age was 41 years. For every 100 females there were 96.20 males. For every 100 females age 18 and over, there were 92.30 males.

The median income for a household in the county was $36,197, and the median income for a family was $44,043. Males had a median income of $29,398 versus $21,222 for females. The per capita income for the county was $18,247. About 4.20% of families and 7.00% of the population were below the poverty line, including 7.70% of those under age 18 and 6.40% of those age 65 or over.

== Education ==
=== Primary and secondary ===
School districts include:

- Belmond–Klemme Community School District
- CAL Community School District
- Clarion–Goldfield–Dows Community School District - Established on July 1, 2014.
- Eagle Grove Community School District
- Humboldt Community School District
- West Fork Community School District - Established on July 1, 2011.
- West Hancock Community School District
- Webster City Community School District

Former school districts:

- Clarion–Goldfield Community School District, Established on July 1, 1993, and merged into Clarion-Goldfield-Dows on July 1, 2014.
- Corwith–Wesley Community School District, dissolved on July 1, 2015.
- Dows Community School District merged into Clarion-Goldfield-Dows on July 1, 2014.
- Northeast Hamilton Community School District merged into Webster City CSD on July 1, 2019.
- Sheffield–Chapin–Meservey–Thornton Community School District (SCMT), merged into West Fork CSD on July 1, 2011.

These three school districts in Wright County have or had high schools in the county:

- Clarion-Goldfield-Dows Community School District K-12 Enrollment 954
- Eagle Grove Community School District K-12 Enrollment 836
- Belmond-Klemme Community School District K-12 Enrollment 793

=== Tertiary ===
Iowa State University maintains an extension office in Clarion. Iowa Central Community College in Fort Dodge, North Iowa Area Community College in Mason City, and Ellsworth Community College in Iowa Falls are all within driving distance of Wright County. Iowa Central Community College began offering ICN Polycom classes in Clarion and Eagle Grove in 2015.

== Politics ==
Wright County has, like many counties in Iowa, been a swing county for the majority of its history. The county has voted for the winning candidate in 21 out of the 25 presidential elections in the 20th Century. However, in 2000, the county was won by Republican George W. Bush and has voted for the party in all presidential elections since.

United States presidential election results for Wright County, Iowa
Year	Republican		Democratic		Third party(ies)	
Year	No.	%	No.	%	No.	%
1896	2,992	71.39%	1,138	27.15%	61	1.46%
1900	2,990	75.07%	891	22.37%	102	2.56%
1904	2,795	77.38%	695	19.24%	122	3.38%
1908	2,498	72.34%	866	25.08%	89	2.58%
1912	805	22.64%	765	21.52%	1,985	55.84%
1916	2,599	68.22%	1,135	29.79%	76	1.99%
1920	5,739	81.04%	1,205	17.01%	138	1.95%
1924	4,323	57.40%	501	6.65%	2,707	35.94%
1928	5,020	65.79%	2,547	33.38%	63	0.83%
1932	3,262	39.14%	4,922	59.06%	150	1.80%
1936	3,311	38.01%	5,177	59.44%	222	2.55%
1940	4,443	47.52%	4,871	52.10%	36	0.39%
1944	3,916	47.86%	4,232	51.72%	35	0.43%
1948	3,810	48.85%	3,866	49.56%	124	1.59%
1952	6,566	67.12%	3,186	32.57%	31	0.32%
1956	5,512	58.70%	3,865	41.16%	13	0.14%
1960	5,386	56.34%	4,159	43.50%	15	0.16%
1964	2,831	36.13%	4,998	63.78%	7	0.09%
1968	4,299	56.95%	2,969	39.33%	281	3.72%
1972	4,278	59.73%	2,780	38.82%	104	1.45%
1976	3,544	48.67%	3,637	49.95%	101	1.39%
1980	3,936	55.07%	2,645	37.01%	566	7.92%
1984	3,675	54.81%	2,980	44.44%	50	0.75%
1988	2,658	43.90%	3,353	55.38%	43	0.71%
1992	2,708	40.63%	2,776	41.65%	1,181	17.72%
1996	2,473	41.50%	2,912	48.87%	574	9.63%
2000	3,384	53.41%	2,796	44.13%	156	2.46%
2004	3,631	54.99%	2,930	44.37%	42	0.64%
2008	3,198	50.01%	3,102	48.51%	95	1.49%
2012	3,349	53.35%	2,836	45.17%	93	1.48%
2016	3,800	63.06%	1,896	31.46%	330	5.48%
2020	4,136	66.13%	1,996	31.92%	122	1.95%
2024	3,853	67.32%	1,770	30.93%	100	1.75%

== Media ==
Several small newspapers are published in Wright County, including the Wright County Monitor, serving Clarion and Dows, the Eagle Grove Eagle, and the Belmond Independent.

== Wright County Fair ==
The first Wright County Fair was held in Clarion. The old fairgrounds were located where Clarion's USA Healthcare Center stands today. the Clarion Fair ran until 1924; it was held in Goldfield in 1925, and moved to its present location in Eagle Grove in 1926; it was later retitled as the Wright County District Junior Fair. Entries are open to children in Hamilton, Humboldt, Webster, Hardin, Franklin, and Wright Counties.

== Communities ==
=== Cities ===
- Belmond
- Clarion
- Dows
- Eagle Grove
- Galt
- Goldfield
- Rowan
- Woolstock

=== Unincorporated communities ===
- Cornelia
- Holmes
- Olaf
- Thrall

=== Ghost towns ===
- Aldrich
- Bach Grove
- Bruce
- Crown Point
- Drew
- Dry Lake
- Eagle Grove Junction
- Eagleville
- Empire
- Fryeburg
- Galtville
- Grant
- Lena
- Liberty

=== Townships ===
- Belmond
- Blaine
- Boone
- Dayton
- Eagle Grove
- Grant
- Iowa
- Lake
- Liberty
- Lincoln
- Norway
- Pleasant
- Troy
- Vernon
- Wall Lake
- Woolstock

=== Population ranking ===
The population ranking of the following table is based on the 2020 census of Wright County.

† county seat

Rank	City/Town/etc.	Municipal type	Population (2020 Census)
1	Eagle Grove	City	3,601
2	† Clarion	City	2,810
3	Belmond	City	2,463
4	Goldfield	City	634
5	Dows (partially in Franklin County)	City	521
6	Woolstock	City	144
7	Rowan	City	123
8	Galt	City	26

== See also ==
- Wright County Courthouse
- Wright County Egg
- National Register of Historic Places listings in Wright County, Iowa
