= Pleasant Township, Wright County, Iowa =

Township in Wright County, Iowa, U.S.

Coordinates: 42°51′48.9″N 93°32′54.7″W

Pleasant Township is a township of Wright County, Iowa, United States.
