= Rowan, Iowa =

- City
- Location of Rowan, Iowa
- Coordinates: 42°44′24″N 93°33′01″W
- Country: USA
- State: Iowa
- County: Wright

Area
  - Total: 0.52 sq mi (1.35 km^{2})
  - Land: 0.52 sq mi (1.35 km^{2})
  - Water: 0 sq mi (0.00 km^{2})
- Elevation: 1,207 ft (368 m)

Population (2020)
  - Total: 123
  - Density: 236.0/sq mi (91.13/km^{2})
- Time zone: UTC-6 (Central (CST))
  - Summer (DST): UTC-5 (CDT)
- ZIP code: 50470
- Area code: 641
- FIPS code: 19-69015
- GNIS feature ID: 2396441
- Website: cityofrowan.com

Rowan is a city in Wright County, Iowa, United States. The population was 123 at the time of the 2020 census.

== Geography ==
According to the United States Census Bureau, the city has a total area of 0.49 square miles (1.27 km^{2}), all land.

== Demographics ==
Historical populations
Year	Pop.	±%
1910	256	—
1920	302	+18.0%
1930	330	+9.3%
1940	316	−4.2%
1950	304	−3.8%
1960	273	−10.2%
1970	231	−15.4%
1980	259	+12.1%
1990	189	−27.0%
2000	218	+15.3%
2010	158	−27.5%
2020	123	−22.2%
Source:"U.S. Census website". United States Census Bureau. and Iowa Data Center; Source: U.S. Decennial Census

=== 2020 census ===
As of the census of 2020, there were 123 people, 65 households, and 32 families residing in the city. The population density was 236.0 inhabitants per square mile (91.1/km^{2}). There were 89 housing units at an average density of 170.8 per square mile (65.9/km^{2}). The racial makeup of the city was 85.4% White, 0.0% Black or African American, 0.0% Native American, 0.0% Asian, 0.0% Pacific Islander, 5.7% from other races and 8.9% from two or more races. Hispanic or Latino persons of any race comprised 13.0% of the population.

Of the 65 households, 26.2% of which had children under the age of 18 living with them, 32.3% were married couples living together, 9.2% were cohabitating couples, 30.8% had a female householder with no spouse or partner present and 27.7% had a male householder with no spouse or partner present. 50.8% of all households were non-families. 46.2% of all households were made up of individuals, 26.2% had someone living alone who was 65 years old or older. The median age in the city was 49.8 years. 18.7% of the residents were under the age of 20; 4.1% were between the ages of 20 and 24; 22.0% were from 25 and 44; 26.0% were from 45 and 64; and 29.3% were 65 years of age or older. The gender makeup of the city was 53.7% male and 46.3% female.

=== 2010 census ===
As of the census of 2010, there were 158 people, 67 households, and 44 families residing in the city. The population density was 322.4 inhabitants per square mile (124.5/km^{2}). There were 95 housing units at an average density of 193.9 per square mile (74.9/km^{2}). The racial makeup of the city was 100.0% White. Hispanic or Latino of any race were 9.5% of the population.

There were 67 households, of which 20.9% had children under the age of 18 living with them, 47.8% were married couples living together, 10.4% had a female householder with no husband present, 7.5% had a male householder with no wife present, and 34.3% were non-families. 26.9% of all households were made up of individuals, and 12% had someone living alone who was 65 years of age or older. The average household size was 2.36 and the average family size was 2.75.

The median age in the city was 44 years. 19.6% of residents were under the age of 18; 9.4% were between the ages of 18 and 24; 21.5% were from 25 to 44; 26.6% were from 45 to 64; and 22.8% were 65 years of age or older. The gender makeup of the city was 56.3% male and 43.7% female.

=== 2000 census ===
As of the census of 2000, there were 218 people, 93 households, and 55 families residing in the city. The population density was 387.4 inhabitants per square mile (149.6/km^{2}). There were 103 housing units at an average density of 183.1 per square mile (70.7/km^{2}). The racial makeup of the city was 92.20% White, 3.21% Native American, 3.67% from other races, and 0.92% from two or more races. Hispanic or Latino of any race were 6.88% of the population.

There were 93 households, out of which 28.0% had children under the age of 18 living with them, 49.5% were married couples living together, 7.5% had a female householder with no husband present, and 39.8% were non-families. 37.6% of all households were made up of individuals, and 28.0% had someone living alone who was 65 years of age or older. The average household size was 2.34 and the average family size was 3.14.

Age spread: 28.9% under the age of 18, 4.1% from 18 to 24, 24.8% from 25 to 44, 17.0% from 45 to 64, and 25.2% who were 65 years of age or older. The median age was 39 years. For every 100 females, there were 91.2 males. For every 100 females age 18 and over, there were 78.2 males.

The median income for a household in the city was $25,000, and the median income for a family was $34,531. Males had a median income of $26,500 versus $18,750 for females. The per capita income for the city was $13,077. About 5.1% of families and 6.3% of the population were below the poverty line, including none of those under the age of eighteen and 12.3% of those 65 or over.

== Community ==
Rowan, located right along Highway 3 in the eastern portion of Wright County, has a lot to offer for a town of 123 people. The Iowa River Players Community Theatre, located in the renovated former school gymnasium, presents 3–4 performances per year and brings people from several surrounding communities. The 2007 Rowan Community Building on Main Street houses the Rowan Public Library, City Hall, and a Community Center. Rowan's main street also features a playground, fire station, custom wood framing shop, machine and welding business, and a historical museum. NEW Cooperative has a new grain elevator and feed mill east of town. Rowan has one church in town, the United Church of Rowan, which is a yoked church that belongs to both the United Church of Christ (Congregational) and the United Methodist Church. There is also a church 4 miles west of Rowan at the Highway 3/69 Junction—the Immanuel Missouri-Synod Lutheran Church. Rowan is a small community that offers affordable housing and is a 10-mile commute to either Belmond or Clarion and Interstate 35 is a short 7-mile drive east.

== Education ==
Belmond–Klemme Community School District serves the community.

The original brick classroom building was constructed in 1914, with the gymnasium addition added in 1949. In 1962 the state forced there merger of the Rowan School District with the Belmond Community School District. The high school students began attending Belmond in the fall of 1962, with the junior high moving in 1963. A grade school was continued until 1971, when the school was closed. The original 1914 brick classrooms were demolished in 1977. The 1949 gymnasium structure has been renovated over the years to become the Rowan Events Center.

Owned by the City of Rowan, the gymnasium is now used as the Iowa River Players Community Theatre. The lower level houses a community room for events throughout the year, such as the Legion Fish Fry and the Lions Chicken Barbecue. Belmond–Klemme CSD formed on July 1, 1994, with the merger of the Belmond and Klemme districts.
