= Iowa Township, Wright County, Iowa =

Township in Iowa, USA

Coordinates: 42°47′N 93°34′W

Iowa Township is a township in Wright County, Iowa, United States.
