= Eagle Grove Township, Wright County, Iowa =

Township in Iowa, USA

Coordinates: 42°42′N 93°55′W

Eagle Grove Township is a township (United States) in Wright County, Iowa.
