= Belmond Township, Wright County, Iowa =

Township in Iowa, USA

Coordinates: 42°52′N 93°41′W

Belmond Township is a township in Wright County, Iowa, United States.
