= Colfax Township, Boone County, Iowa =

Township in Iowa, US

Colfax Township, Boone County
- Township
- Coordinates: 41°59′59″N 093°45′09″W
- Country: United States
- State: Iowa
- County: Boone

Area
  - Total: 34.97 sq mi (90.57 km^{2})
  - Land: 34.97 sq mi (90.57 km^{2})
  - Water: 0 sq mi (0 km^{2})
- Elevation: 1,056 ft (322 m)

Population (2000)
  - Total: 746
  - Density: 21/sq mi (8.2/km^{2})
- FIPS code: 19-90756
- GNIS feature ID: 0467632

Colfax Township is one of seventeen townships in Boone County, Iowa, United States. As of the 2000 census, its population was 746.

== History ==
Colfax Township was organized in 1871. It is named for Schuyler Colfax.

== Geography ==
Colfax Township covers an area of 34.97 square miles (90.6 km^{2}) and contains no incorporated settlements. According to the USGS, it contains one cemetery, Olive Branch.
