= Freedom Township, Hamilton County, Iowa =

Township in Iowa, USA

Coordinates: 42°26′N 93°52′W

Freedom Township is a township in Hamilton County, Iowa, USA.
