= Goldfield, Iowa =

- City
- Location of Goldfield, Iowa
- Coordinates: 42°44′08″N 93°55′04″W
- Country: USA
- State: Iowa
- County: Wright

Area
  - Total: 1.17 sq mi (3.04 km^{2})
  - Land: 1.17 sq mi (3.04 km^{2})
  - Water: 0 sq mi (0.00 km^{2})
- Elevation: 1,129 ft (344 m)

Population (2020)
  - Total: 634
  - Density: 539.4/sq mi (208.25/km^{2})
- Time zone: UTC-6 (Central (CST))
  - Summer (DST): UTC-5 (CDT)
- ZIP code: 50542
- Area code: 515
- FIPS code: 19-31530
- GNIS feature ID: 2394925

Goldfield is a city in Wright County, Iowa, United States. The population was 634 at the time of the 2020 census.

== History ==
A post office called Goldfield has been in operation since 1856. Brassfield was the name of a pioneer settler, but it was decided that Goldfield sounded like a more suitable placename.

== Geography ==
Goldfield's longitude and latitude coordinates in decimal form are 42.734708, -93.920163. The city is located along the Boone River.

According to the United States Census Bureau, the city has a total area of 1.19 square miles (3.08 km^{2}), all land.

== Demographics ==
Historical populations
| Year | Pop. | ±% |
|---|---|---|
| 1880 | 99 | — |
| 1890 | 343 | +246.5% |
| 1900 | 628 | +83.1% |
| 1910 | 618 | −1.6% |
| 1920 | 749 | +21.2% |
| 1930 | 700 | −6.5% |
| 1940 | 715 | +2.1% |
| 1950 | 665 | −7.0% |
| 1960 | 682 | +2.6% |
| 1970 | 722 | +5.9% |
| 1980 | 789 | +9.3% |
| 1990 | 710 | −10.0% |
| 2000 | 680 | −4.2% |
| 2010 | 635 | −6.6% |
| 2020 | 634 | −0.2% |
Source:"U.S. Census website". United States Census Bureau. and Iowa Data Center; Source: U.S. Decennial Census

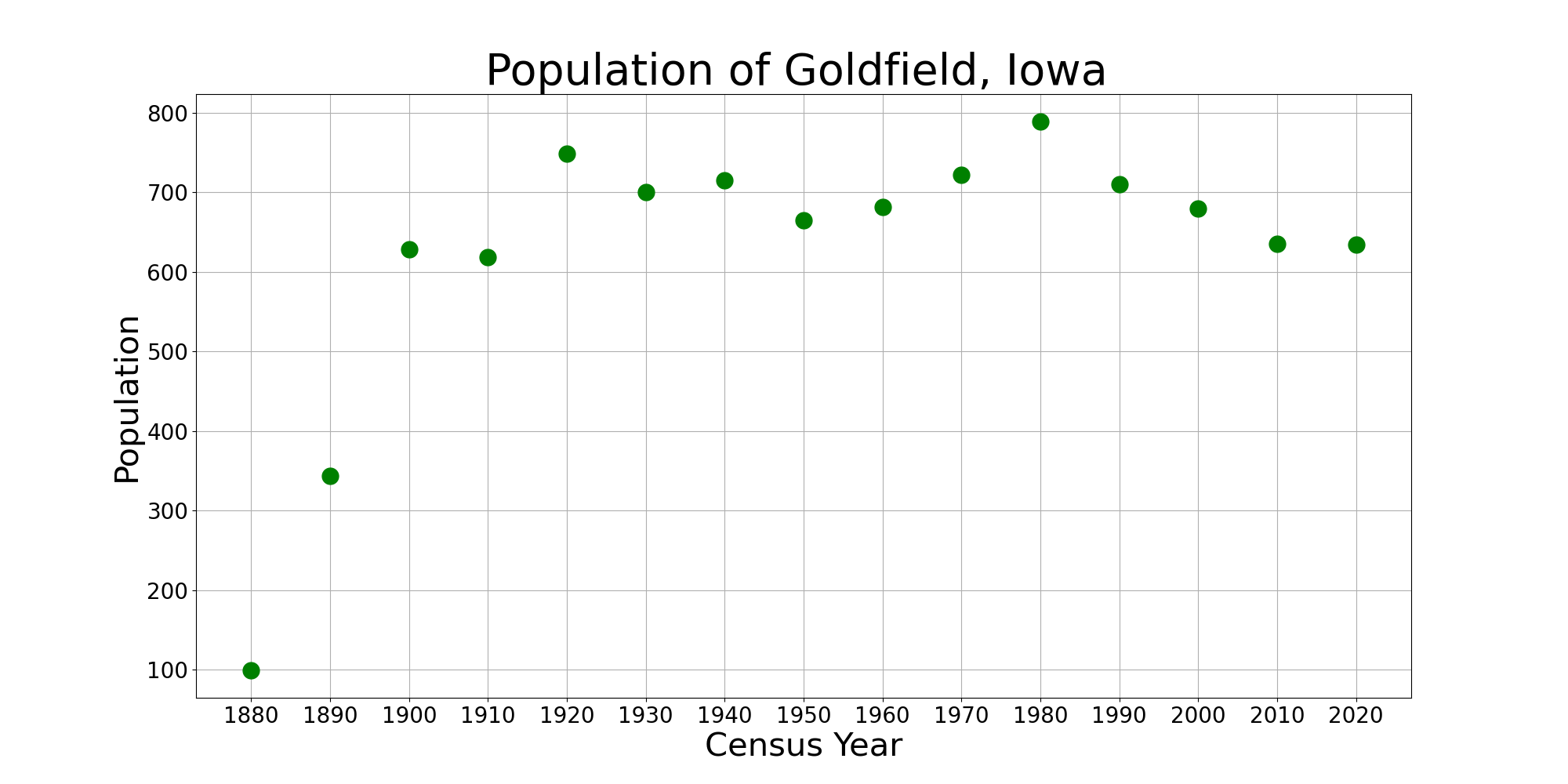
The population of Goldfield, Iowa from US census data

=== 2020 census ===
As of the census of 2020, there were 634 people, 269 households, and 169 families residing in the city. The population density was 539.4 inhabitants per square mile (208.2/km^{2}). There were 298 housing units at an average density of 253.5 per square mile (97.9/km^{2}). The racial makeup of the city was 90.9% White, 0.0% Black or African American, 0.3% Native American, 0.2% Asian, 0.2% Pacific Islander, 4.9% from other races and 3.6% from two or more races. Hispanic or Latino persons of any race comprised 9.5% of the population.

Of the 269 households, 24.2% of which had children under the age of 18 living with them, 48.3% were married couples living together, 7.4% were cohabitating couples, 24.5% had a female householder with no spouse or partner present and 19.7% had a male householder with no spouse or partner present. 37.2% of all households were non-families. 30.1% of all households were made up of individuals, 12.3% had someone living alone who was 65 years old or older.

The median age in the city was 41.6 years. 26.2% of the residents were under the age of 20; 2.8% were between the ages of 20 and 24; 25.7% were from 25 and 44; 24.9% were from 45 and 64; and 20.3% were 65 years of age or older. The gender makeup of the city was 47.9% male and 52.1% female.

=== 2010 census ===
As of the census of 2010, there were 635 people, 290 households, and 187 families living in the city. The population density was 533.6 inhabitants per square mile (206.0/km^{2}). There were 313 housing units at an average density of 263.0 per square mile (101.5/km^{2}). The racial makeup of the city was 95.4% White, 0.3% African American, 0.5% Native American, 0.9% from other races, and 2.8% from two or more races. Hispanic or Latino of any race were 3.0% of the population.

There were 290 households, of which 23.8% had children under the age of 18 living with them, 50.7% were married couples living together, 8.3% had a female householder with no husband present, 5.5% had a male householder with no wife present, and 35.5% were non-families. 31.0% of all households were made up of individuals, and 13.8% had someone living alone who was 65 years of age or older. The average household size was 2.19 and the average family size was 2.67.

The median age in the city was 46.6 years. 19.2% of residents were under the age of 18; 7.6% were between the ages of 18 and 24; 21.2% were from 25 to 44; 31% were from 45 to 64; and 21.1% were 65 years of age or older. The gender makeup of the city was 50.7% male and 49.3% female.

=== 2000 census ===
As of the census of 2000, there were 680 people, 295 households, and 194 families living in the city. The population density was 666.0 inhabitants per square mile (257.1/km^{2}). There were 315 housing units at an average density of 308.5 per square mile (119.1/km^{2}). The racial makeup of the city was 99.26% White, 0.15% Native American, 0.44% from other races, and 0.15% from two or more races. Hispanic or Latino of any race were 1.62% of the population.

There were 295 households, out of which 27.5% had children under the age of 18 living with them, 56.9% were married couples living together, 5.1% had a female householder with no husband present, and 34.2% were non-families. 29.5% of all households were made up of individuals, and 18.0% had someone living alone who was 65 years of age or older. The average household size was 2.31 and the average family size was 2.81.

Age spread: 22.6% under the age of 18, 7.9% from 18 to 24, 24.1% from 25 to 44, 22.4% from 45 to 64, and 22.9% who were 65 years of age or older. The median age was 42 years. For every 100 females, there were 104.8 males. For every 100 females age 18 and over, there were 102.3 males.

The median income for a household in the city was $32,411, and the median income for a family was $41,250. Males had a median income of $28,409 versus $19,886 for females. The per capita income for the city was $16,983. About 4.2% of families and 7.2% of the population were below the poverty line, including 5.6% of those under age 18 and 9.9% of those age 65 or over.

== Economy ==
In 2006, a 50 million-gallons-per-year ethanol plant was built in Goldfield by Central Iowa Renewable Energy LLC. The $86 million project brought approximately 40 new jobs to the community.

== Education ==
The community is within the Clarion–Goldfield–Dows Community School District. It was in the Goldfield Community School District until July 1, 1993, when it merged into the Clarion–Goldfield Community School District. That in turn merged with the Dows Community School District on July 1, 2014.

Clarion–Goldfield–Dows Community Schools serve the educational needs of the Goldfield community. The Goldfield Community School provided K–12 education from 1912 to 1981. In 1956, the present Goldfield school building was built. In 1981 Goldfield Community School began whole grade sharing with Clarion Community Schools, the first such arrangement in the state. Clarion is located 8 miles (13 km) East of Goldfield on Highway 3.

At that time Goldfield students in grades 9–12 attended Clarion High School during the morning and returned to Goldfield later for a class and extracurricular activities. In 1985, the board of trustees voted to send all middle school high school students to a school in Clarion, and that Clarion would provide relevant after-school and extracurricular activities. Four board members voted in favor, and one voted against. The Eagle Grove Eagle reported that there had been "considerable objection from the public and some impassioned please by residents" asking the trustees to decide differently.

In 1986 middle school students joined the high school students in Clarion. On July 1, 1993, the Clarion and Goldfield districts passed a merger and reorganized into the Clarion–Goldfield Community School District. The merger was passed by 89% and 99% in each district respectively. An elementary school program was maintained in Goldfield. In 2002, third grade for the entire district was combined in the Goldfield Elementary to greater utilize the building. The Goldfield building was closed in 2008, with all students attending all classes in Clarion. The Clarion–Goldfield and Dows community school districts merged into the Clarion–Goldfield–Dows Community School District in 2014 after 9 years of whole grade sharing. The Clarion–Goldfield–Dows School District had a certified enrollment (K–12) of 943 students in 2018–19.
