= Liberty Township, Wright County, Iowa =

Township in Iowa, US

Coordinates: 42°47′N 93°55′W

Liberty Township is a township in Wright County, Iowa, United States.
