= Wesley Township, Kossuth County, Iowa =

Township in Kossuth County, Iowa, U.S.

Coordinates: 43.1261°N 94.0294°W

Wesley Township is a township in Kossuth County, Iowa, United States.

== History ==
Wesley Township was organized in 1871.
