= Clarion, Iowa =

- City
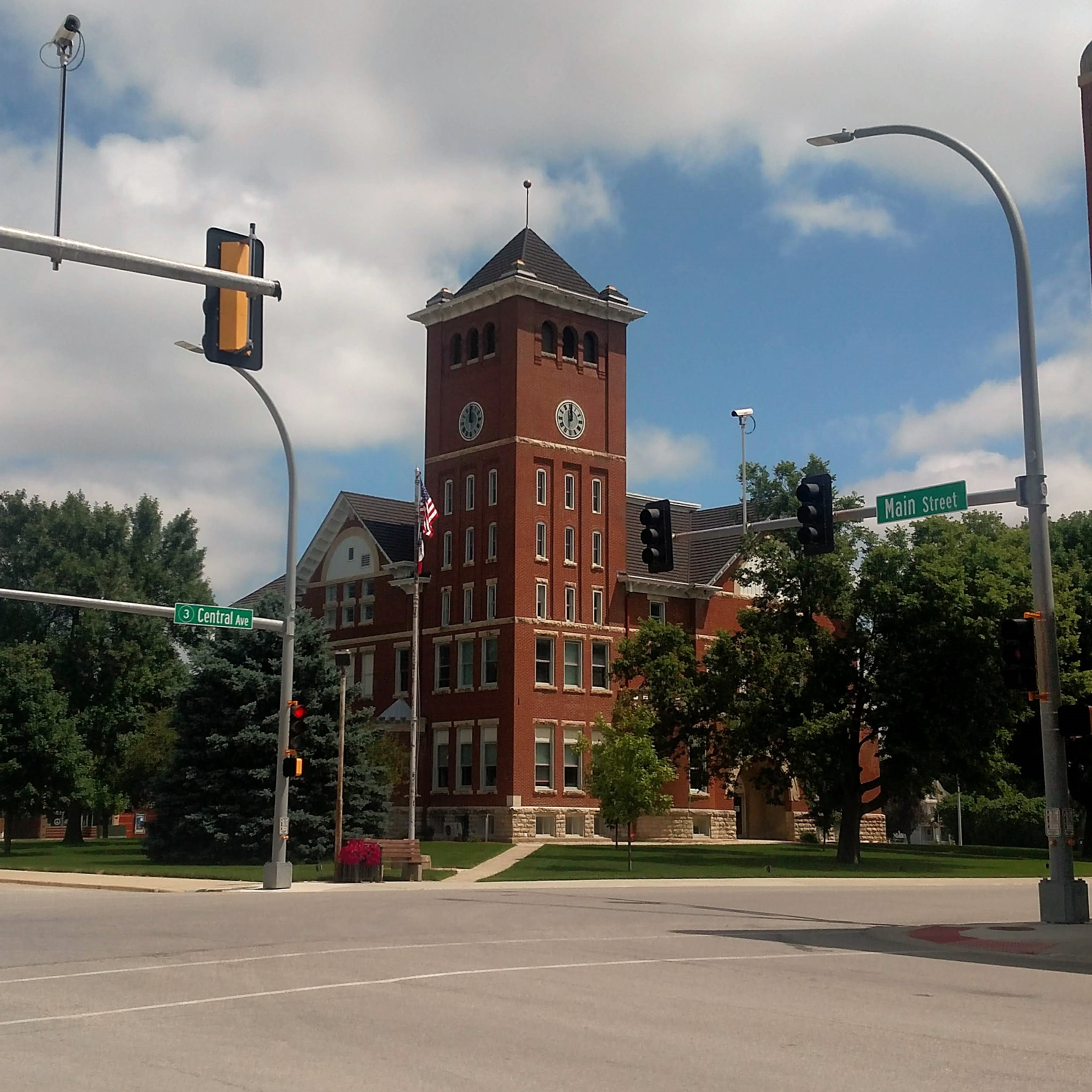
- Wright County Courthouse
- Motto: A Community On The Horizon
- Location of Clarion, Iowa
- Coordinates: 42°43′52″N 93°43′52″W
- Country: United States
- State: Iowa
- County: Wright

Area
  - Total: 3.36 sq mi (8.70 km^{2})
  - Land: 3.36 sq mi (8.70 km^{2})
  - Water: 0 sq mi (0.00 km^{2})
- Elevation: 1,171 ft (357 m)

Population (2020)
  - Total: 2,810
  - Density: 836.5/sq mi (322.99/km^{2})
- Time zone: UTC-6 (Central (CST))
  - Summer (DST): UTC-5 (CDT)
- ZIP codes: 50525-50526
- Area code: 515
- FIPS code: 19-13620
- GNIS feature ID: 0455428
- Website: www.clarioniowa.gov

Clarion is a city in and the county seat of Wright County, Iowa, United States. The population was 2,810 at the time of the 2020 census.

== History ==
Wright County held its first court sessions in 1855 in a privately owned log cabin west of present-day Eagle Grove. In 1858, the county seat was located at Liberty, where a two-story frame courthouse was built. The county seat moved to Clarion in 1866, and the county's first courthouse in Clarion was built across the street from the northeast corner of the public square. That building was later incorporated into the Avondale Hotel.

The present Wright County Courthouse was constructed in 1891 and 1892 at a cost of about $50,000. It was designed by W.R. Parsons & Son and built by E.D. Jones & Co. The courthouse was listed on the National Register of Historic Places in 1981 as part of the County Courthouses in Iowa Thematic Resource.

Clarion is also the birthplace of the four-leaf clover emblem used by the 4-H Clubs of America, conceived of in 1907 by the local school superintendent, O.H. Benson.

== Geography ==
According to the United States Census Bureau, the city has a total area of 3.26 square miles (8.44 km^{2}), all land.

=== Climate ===
According to the Köppen Climate Classification system, Clarion has a hot-summer humid continental climate, abbreviated "Dfa" on climate maps.

Climate data for Clarion, Iowa, 1991–2020 normals, extremes 1944–2021
Month	Jan	Feb	Mar	Apr	May	Jun	Jul	Aug	Sep	Oct	Nov	Dec	Year
Record high °F (°C)	66 (19)	67 (19)	86 (30)	96 (36)	102 (39)	102 (39)	103 (39)	102 (39)	99 (37)	94 (34)	85 (29)	67 (19)	103 (39)
Mean maximum °F (°C)	44.6 (7.0)	49.0 (9.4)	68.4 (20.2)	81.7 (27.6)	87.9 (31.1)	92.6 (33.7)	93.6 (34.2)	91.3 (32.9)	89.9 (32.2)	82.4 (28.0)	66.3 (19.1)	50.3 (10.2)	95.4 (35.2)
Mean daily maximum °F (°C)	25.8 (−3.4)	31.1 (−0.5)	44.0 (6.7)	59.0 (15.0)	71.6 (22.0)	82.0 (27.8)	85.0 (29.4)	82.3 (27.9)	76.3 (24.6)	63.1 (17.3)	45.4 (7.4)	31.4 (−0.3)	58.1 (14.5)
Daily mean °F (°C)	16.0 (−8.9)	21.1 (−6.1)	34.2 (1.2)	47.0 (8.3)	59.6 (15.3)	70.3 (21.3)	73.4 (23.0)	71.1 (21.7)	63.6 (17.6)	50.7 (10.4)	35.1 (1.7)	22.2 (−5.4)	47.0 (8.3)
Mean daily minimum °F (°C)	6.2 (−14.3)	11.2 (−11.6)	24.5 (−4.2)	35.0 (1.7)	47.7 (8.7)	58.6 (14.8)	61.9 (16.6)	59.9 (15.5)	50.9 (10.5)	38.3 (3.5)	24.8 (−4.0)	13.0 (−10.6)	36.0 (2.2)
Mean minimum °F (°C)	−15.6 (−26.4)	−9.4 (−23.0)	1.1 (−17.2)	20.7 (−6.3)	33.3 (0.7)	46.6 (8.1)	51.8 (11.0)	48.7 (9.3)	35.8 (2.1)	22.4 (−5.3)	9.2 (−12.7)	−7.9 (−22.2)	−18.3 (−27.9)
Record low °F (°C)	−32 (−36)	−30 (−34)	−26 (−32)	3 (−16)	21 (−6)	34 (1)	42 (6)	32 (0)	21 (−6)	12 (−11)	−18 (−28)	−26 (−32)	−32 (−36)
Average precipitation inches (mm)	0.73 (19)	0.91 (23)	1.96 (50)	3.75 (95)	4.81 (122)	5.81 (148)	4.04 (103)	4.10 (104)	3.13 (80)	2.29 (58)	1.52 (39)	1.22 (31)	34.27 (872)
Average snowfall inches (cm)	8.9 (23)	6.2 (16)	5.7 (14)	1.4 (3.6)	0.0 (0.0)	0.0 (0.0)	0.0 (0.0)	0.0 (0.0)	0.0 (0.0)	0.1 (0.25)	2.9 (7.4)	5.9 (15)	31.1 (79.25)
Average precipitation days (≥ 0.01 in)	5.1	4.5	6.0	8.5	11.8	10.6	8.9	8.0	6.8	7.3	5.5	4.9	87.9
Average snowy days (≥ 0.1 in)	4.9	3.6	2.1	0.6	0.0	0.0	0.0	0.0	0.0	0.3	1.9	4.2	17.6
Source 1: NOAA
Source 2: National Weather Service

== Demographics ==
Historical population
Year	Pop.	±%
1870	37	—
1880	147	+297.3%
1890	744	+406.1%
1900	1,475	+98.3%
1910	2,065	+40.0%
1920	2,826	+36.9%
1930	2,578	−8.8%
1940	2,971	+15.2%
1950	3,150	+6.0%
1960	3,232	+2.6%
1970	2,972	−8.0%
1980	3,060	+3.0%
1990	2,703	−11.7%
2000	2,968	+9.8%
2010	2,850	−4.0%
2020	2,810	−1.4%
Source: "U.S. Census website". United States Census Bureau. Source: U.S. Decennial Census

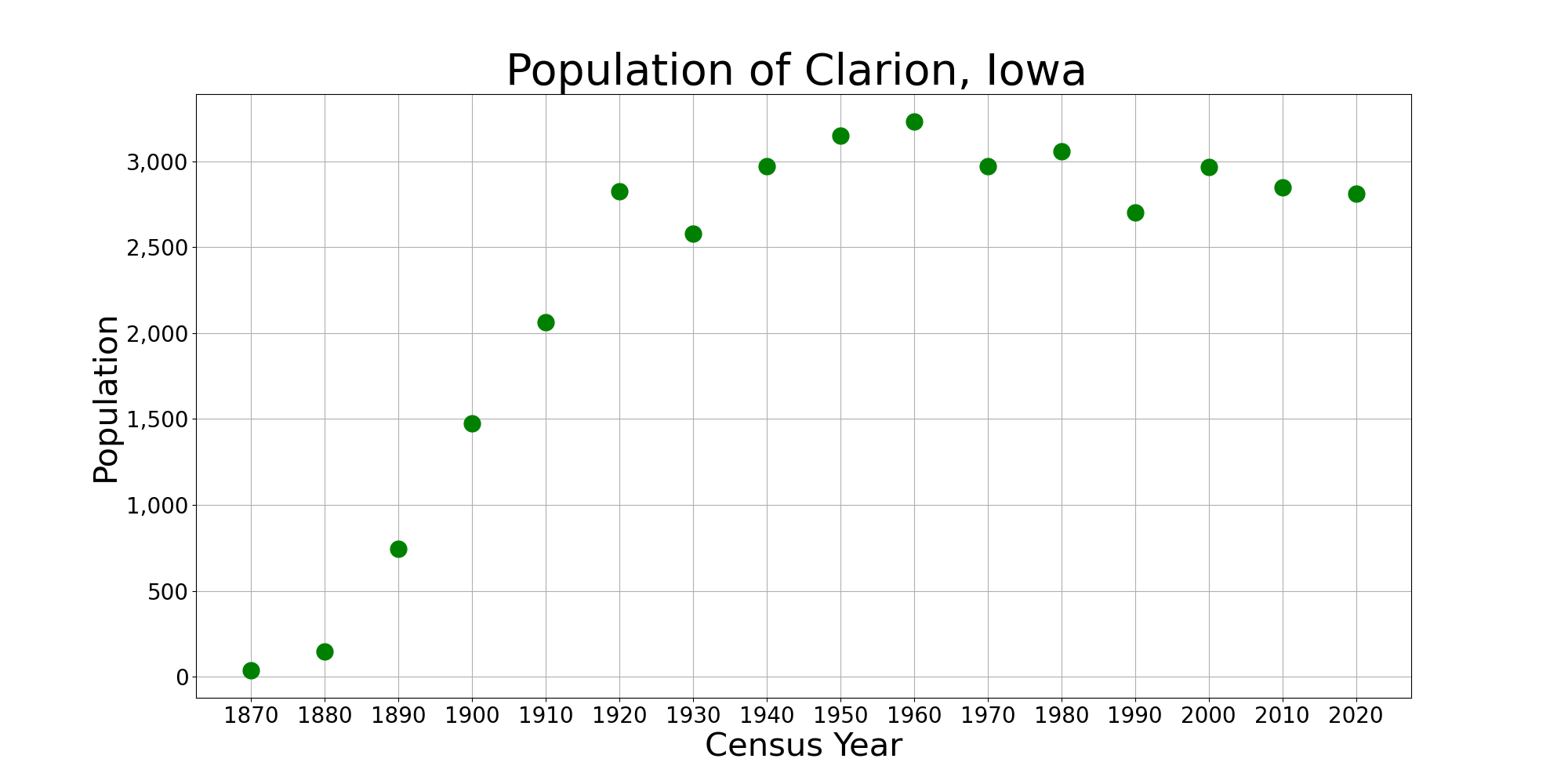
The population of Clarion, Iowa from US census data

=== 2020 census ===
As of the 2020 census, Clarion had a population of 2,810, with 1,153 households and 720 families residing in the city. The population density was 836.5 inhabitants per square mile (323.0/km^{2}). There were 1,327 housing units at an average density of 395.0 per square mile (152.5/km^{2}).

The median age was 39.1 years. 26.4% of residents were under the age of 18 and 20.0% were 65 years of age or older. Age distribution was 28.2% under the age of 20, 4.6% from 20 to 24, 24.1% from 25 to 44, and 23.0% from 45 to 64. For every 100 females there were 97.5 males, and for every 100 females age 18 and over there were 92.6 males age 18 and over.

Of the 1,153 households, 30.4% had children under the age of 18 living with them. Of all households, 47.5% were married-couple households, 4.5% were cohabitating-couple households, 19.1% were households with a male householder and no spouse or partner present, and 28.9% were households with a female householder and no spouse or partner present. About 37.6% were non-family households, 33.1% were made up of individuals, and 18.2% had someone living alone who was 65 years of age or older.

Of the housing units, 13.1% were vacant. The homeowner vacancy rate was 3.1% and the rental vacancy rate was 17.7%.

0.0% of residents lived in urban areas, while 100.0% lived in rural areas.

Racial composition as of the 2020 census
Race	Number	Percent
White	2,109	75.1%
Black or African American	6	0.2%
American Indian and Alaska Native	26	0.9%
Asian	30	1.1%
Native Hawaiian and Other Pacific Islander	2	0.1%
Some other race	465	16.5%
Two or more races	172	6.1%
Hispanic or Latino (of any race)	737	26.2%

=== 2010 census ===
As of the census of 2010, there were 2,850 people, 1,185 households, and 752 families residing in the city. The population density was 874.2 inhabitants per square mile (337.5/km^{2}). There were 1,346 housing units at an average density of 412.9 per square mile (159.4/km^{2}). The racial makeup of the city was 91.9% White, 0.5% African American, 0.3% Native American, 0.5% Asian, 0.1% Pacific Islander, 5.0% from other races, and 1.8% from two or more races. Hispanic or Latino of any race were 15.9% of the population.

There were 1,185 households, of which 30.5% had children under the age of 18 living with them, 49.9% were married couples living together, 9.3% had a female householder with no husband present, 4.3% had a male householder with no wife present, and 36.5% were non-families. 32.2% of all households were made up of individuals, and 18.2% had someone living alone who was 65 years of age or older. The average household size was 2.34 and the average family size was 2.94.

The median age in the city was 41.3 years. 24.8% of residents were under the age of 18; 7.1% were between the ages of 18 and 24; 22.5% were from 25 to 44; 24.9% were from 45 to 64; and 20.7% were 65 years of age or older. The gender makeup of the city was 48.8% male and 51.2% female.

=== 2000 census ===
As of the census of 2000, there were 2,968 people, 1,255 households, and 786 families residing in the city. The population density was 1,081.6 inhabitants per square mile (417.6/km^{2}). There were 1,355 housing units at an average density of 493.8 per square mile (190.7/km^{2}). The racial makeup of the city was 93.67% White, 0.20% African American, 0.24% Native American, 0.13% Asian, 5.53% from other races, and 0.24% from two or more races. Hispanic or Latino of any race were 9.80% of the population.

There were 1,255 households, out of which 27.5% had children under the age of 18 living with them, 53.5% were married couples living together, 6.4% had a female householder with no husband present, and 37.3% were non-families. 33.1% of all households were made up of individuals, and 19.0% had someone living alone who was 65 years of age or older. The average household size was 2.29 and the average family size was 2.89.

Age spread: 23.6% under the age of 18, 7.2% from 18 to 24, 24.1% from 25 to 44, 21.7% from 45 to 64, and 23.5% who were 65 years of age or older. The median age was 42 years. For every 100 females, there were 90.1 males. For every 100 females age 18 and over, there were 86.7 males.

The median income for a household in the city was $37,026, and the median income for a family was $47,083. Males had a median income of $28,281 versus $23,077 for females. The per capita income for the city was $18,431. About 5.3% of families and 9.9% of the population were below the poverty line, including 12.4% of those under age 18 and 7.2% of those age 65 or over.

=== Religion ===
There are several churches in Clarion including First Methodist Church, First Lutheran Church, St. John's Catholic Church, Clarion Church of Christ, United Presbyterian Church, United Church of Christ Congregational, The Dwelling Place, and the Lighthouse Church of the Nazarene. First Lutheran Church shares a pastor with the First Lutheran Church in Dows. St. John's Catholic Church is part of the Holy Family Cluster, which includes catholic churches in Clarion, Eagle Grove, and Belmond. Two churches are located in Holmes, an unincorporated community five miles west of Clarion, including Holmes Evangelical Lutheran Church and Holmes Baptist Church. Immanuel Lutheran Church (Lutheran Church–Missouri Synod) is located 6 miles east of Clarion.

== Economy ==
=== Downtown ===
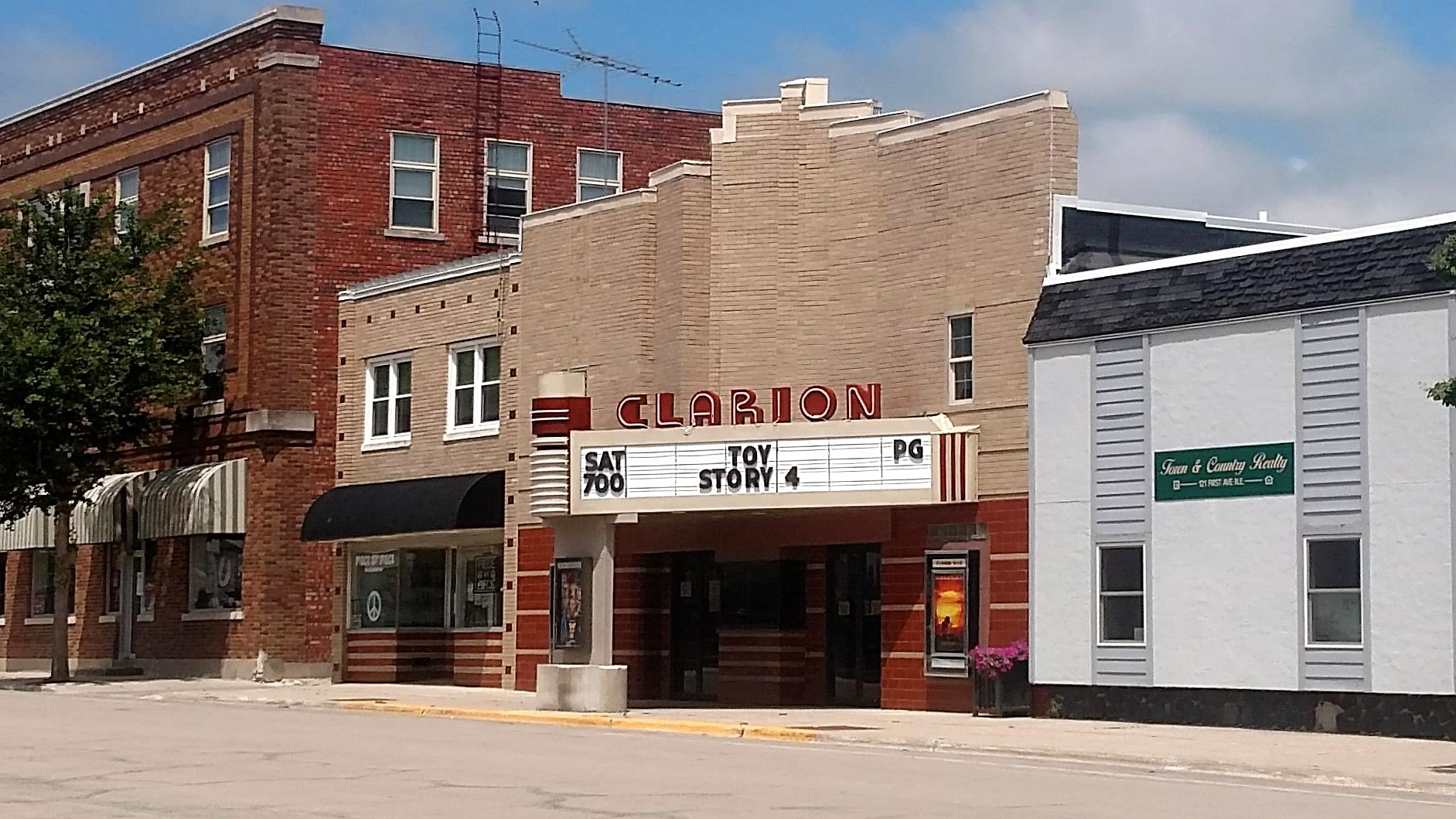
Downtown Clarion

Clarion's downtown features many buildings built in the 19th century. The center of the business district is the Wright County Courthouse, listed on the National Register of Historic Places. The courthouse is underway to renovate the courtroom to both modernize the facility and restore some of the original architecture.

=== Industry ===
Clarion has seen industrial expansion creating additional jobs. The development of the Clarion Industrial Park has led to the opening of a new factory, Clarion Packaging LLC, that has built a 114,000 sq ft (10,600 m^{2}) egg carton factory that manufactures egg cartons out of recycled paper. The project added 120 new jobs to the community. There is a 12,000 sq ft (1,100 m^{2}) speculative building available. The industrial park features a new paved access road, sewer and water on site, railroad on site, located blocks south of Highway 3.

Hagie Manufacturing is located on Central Avenue West. The company, incorporated by Ray Hagie, is responsible for designing and building the first high clearance sprayer. The sprayers also feature 120-foot (37 m) long booms, the new standard in the industry. Hagie has expanded significantly in the past three years, building a 75,000 square foot addition to their facility in 2008. They also acquired the former Meredith Corporation facilities which added an entirely new campus. Hagie is one of the leading employers in the Clarion area.

Some of the other industrial companies in Clarion include Monsanto Company, SportsGraphics, Stronghold, Wright County Egg, Centrum Valley Farms, Ahrends Grips and North Central Cooperative.

Wright County is the largest egg producing county in the nation.

== Education ==
The community is within the Clarion–Goldfield–Dows Community School District. It was in the Clarion Community School District until July 1, 1993, when it merged into the Clarion–Goldfield Community School District. That in turn merged with the Dows Community School District on July 1, 2014.

=== Library ===
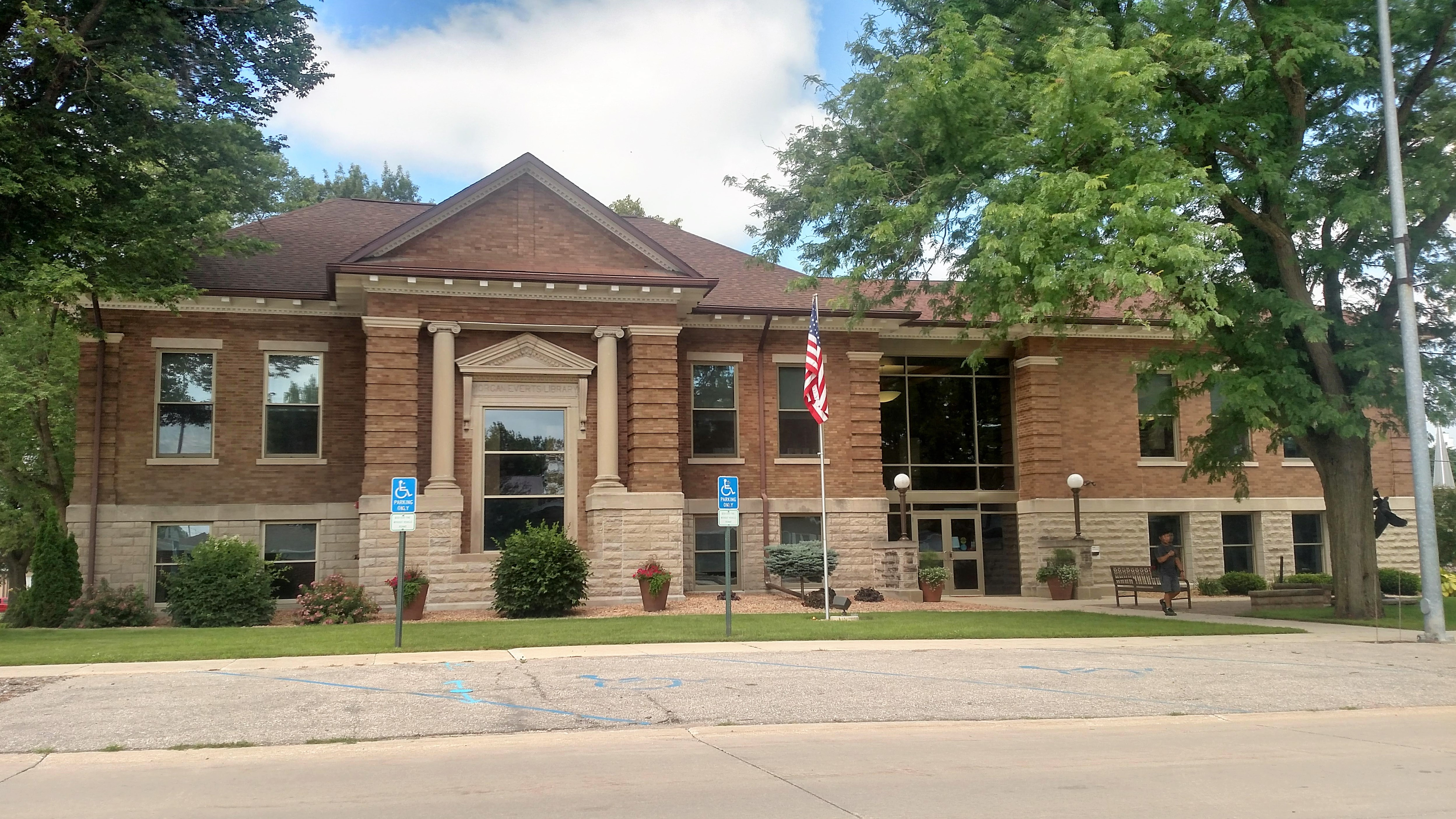
Morgan Everts Library in Clarion

The Clarion Public Library was built in 1908. In 2009, an addition to the north side of the building was added. Also, a renovation project was finished that included doubling the square footage of the building. During the renovation, the original 1908 ceiling was revealed, along with a small attic that contained relics from the early 1900s.

== Human resources ==
=== Public health ===
Iowa Specialty Hospital (formerly Wright Medical Center) is located in the city and was recently awarded such prestigious awards as the Firestarter Award by the Studer Group and the Summit Award by Press Ganey Associates. Wright Medical Center and Belmond Medical Center began a partnership, which eventually led to the two facilities being renamed Iowa Specialty Hospital. In 2006 a major expansion and renovation project was completed making facilities state-of-the-art, including a new emergency room. The hospital enjoys patient satisfaction ratings of 99% and serves patients from a 75-mile (121 km) radius of Clarion. Iowa Specialty Hospital employs about 450 people and has continued to experienced significant growth making it the 2nd largest "small hospital" in the state. A 2011 addition includes three new operating rooms, an out patient surgical clinic, specialty clinic, administrative offices, and a conference center on the lower level. The current maternity center will be renovated into additional labor and delivery rooms, the current specialty clinic will become expanded area for the family practice clinic. The project also included renovations to the radiology area of the facility. Iowa Special Hospital maintains state of the art campuses in Clarion and Belmond as well as outreach clinics in Clear Lake, Hampton, Webster City, Fort Dodge, and West Des Moines. There are two pharmacies, two dental clinics, two optometry clinics, two chiropractors, two medical supply stores, and a hearing aid center all located in Clarion.

=== Parks and recreation ===
In 2006 the new Clarion Aquatic Center was completed and opened in June. The aquatic center features two large slides, two deep-water drop-slides, a zero-depth beach-style entrance with play features, a six-lane lap swimming area, and two diving boards. Clarion has three city parks – the Aquatic Center Park (locally referred to as "Tornado Park"), which is located next to the Aquatic Center, Firemen's Park, and Gazebo Park. Lake Cornelia is located just north of town and features a natural glacier lake, large conservation park including modern camping sites, as well as a new walking/biking trail. Clarion also has a community-run digital movie theatre, renovated in 2012. Gazebo Park is the center of an annual festival, originally called "A Day of Music" and then renamed "Festival in the Park."

== Tourism ==
Heartland Museum is located on the western edge of Clarion on Highway 3. Features include the large agriculture hall with much antique farm equipment, balcony level farm toy displays, and displays showing the history of agriculture. The museum is home to part of Alvina Sellers' Iowa Hat Lady collection of over 6,000 hats. Alvina was from Clarion and gave 5,636 programs including an appearance in the David Letterman Show. The Artist Teddy Bear Museum was completed in 2005 to accommodate the fourth Teddy Bear Reunion in the Heartland in Clarion. The celebration was held every five years since 1990–2010. Another feature of the museum is the period streetscapes that recreate businesses in Clarion from years gone by. The Wright County Historical Library in the museum is a history and research library of information all about Wright County located in the 1920s-1930s streetscape. The Heartland Museum also has a newly renovated and expanded community room available for rent, a steel building was built to house more antique farm machinery, and an Outdoor Learning Center.

The 4-H Schoolhouse Museum is another attraction that was added to the Heartland Museum complex in 2017.

The restored Rock Island Depot is now used as a Senior Center.

== Notable people ==
- Glen Brand, olympic gold medalist wrestler
- Glen Buxton, guitarist for Alice Cooper
- Bernice Durand, physicist
- Lee Handley, MLB baseball player
- Verlyn Klinkenborg, former writer of The Rural Life in the New York Times
- Clifford Joy Rogers, politician
- Dale Schroeder, carpenter and philanthropist
- Mark Thompson, member of the Iowa House of Representatives
- Roy E. Wilson, MLB baseball player, Chicago White Sox
