= West Hancock Community School District =

Public school district in Britt, Iowa, United States

Coordinates: 43.092250°N 93.813475°W

Location
- Britt, Iowa Hancock County and Wright County United States
- Coordinates: 43.092250, -93.813475

District information
- Type: Local school district
- Grades: Prek-12
- Established: 1994
- Superintendent: Jason McLaughlin
- Schools: 3
- Budget: $9,122,000 (2020-21)
- NCES District ID: 1905430

Students and staff
- Students: 624 (2025-26)
- Teachers: 45.17 FTE
- Staff: 44.06 FTE
- Student–teacher ratio: 13.26
- Athletic conference: Top of Iowa
- District mascot: Eagles
- Colors: Red and White

Other information
- Website: whancock.org

West Hancock Community School District is a rural public school district headquartered in West Hancock High School in Britt, Iowa. Mostly in Hancock County with a section in Wright County, it serves the communities of Britt and Kanawha.

The elementary school and the high school are in Britt while the middle school is in Kanawha.

== History ==
The district formed on July 1, 1994, with the merger of the Britt and Kanawha districts.

On July 1, 2015, the Corwith–Wesley Community School District dissolved, with a portion of the district being taken by West Hancock CSD.

In 2019, the district was making plans to renovate some buildings. It initially hired the Des Moines company Samuels Group as a contractor as the company had the lowest bid on a $100,000 plus margin, but the company terminated its involvement, forcing the district to find a new contractor.

== Schools ==
The district operates three schools:

- West Hancock Elementary School, Britt
- West Hancock Middle School, Kanawha
- West Hancock High School, Britt

=== West Hancock High School ===
==== Athletics ====
The Eagles participate in the Top of Iowa Conference in the following sports:

- Football
  - 5-time State Champions (1973 (2A), 1996 (1A), 2019 (A), 2021 (A), 2023 (A))
- Cross Country
- Volleyball
- Basketball
- Bowling
- Wrestling
  - 5-time State Champions (1961, 1962, 1971, 1972, 1973)
- Golf
  - Girls' 1986 Class 1A State Champions
  - Boys' 1981 Class 1A State Champions
- Track and Field
  - Boys' 4-time state Champions (1974, 1992, 2007, 2008)
  - Girls' 1996 Class 1A State Champions
- Baseball
- Softball

== See also ==
- List of school districts in Iowa
- List of high schools in Iowa
