= List of Iowa townships =

Iowa townships
- Map of the 1,599 townships in Iowa
- Category: Lower-level administrative division
- Location: Iowa
- Created: September 1834
- Number: 1,599
- Populations: 57 (Lincoln Township) (Jackson Township) – 102,689 (Des Moines Township)
- Areas: 5.7 square miles (15 km^{2}) (Greenfield Township) – 110.3 square miles (286 km^{2}) (Knoxville Township)
- Government: Township government

This alphabetic list of townships in Iowa and their counties is based on the U.S. Census for 2000. Iowa has 1,599 townships.

Townships in the U.S. state of Iowa are distinct geographical areas. For civil administrative purposes, Iowa state law allows each county board of supervisors to divide the county into townships. An elected or appointed board of trustees governs each township. The trustees are often elected, but may be appointed by the county board of supervisors if authorized by voters after a referendum. Township trustees also serve as fence viewers and may resolve conflicts upon request. Iowa townships may provide fire protection, emergency medical services, cemeteries, community centers, playgrounds, and, upon voter approval, public halls. Although Iowa townships may levy taxes, the county board of supervisors issues anticipatory bonds on behalf of the township and the compensation of township trustees (other than fees) is paid by the county government. For this reason, townships in Iowa are classified as administrative subdivisions of the counties and are not counted as separate governments in the United States Census of Governments.

Township	County
Adams	Dallas
Adams	Delaware
Adams	Keokuk
Adams	Mahaska
Adams	Wapello
Adel	Dallas
Afton	Cherokee
Afton	Howard
Agency	Wapello
Albion	Butler
Albion	Howard
Alden	Hardin
Allen	Harrison
Allen	Polk
Allen	Warren
Allens Grove	Scott
Allison	Lyon
Allison	Osceola
Amaqua	Boone
America	Plymouth
Amherst	Cherokee
Amity	Page
Amsterdam	Hancock
Anderson	Mills
Arcadia	Carroll
Arlington	Woodbury
Armstrong Grove	Emmet
Ashton	Monona
Athens	Ringgold
Auburn	Fayette
Audubon	Audubon
Avery	Hancock
Avery	Humboldt
Badger	Webster
Baker	Guthrie
Baker	O'Brien
Baker	Osceola
Baltimore	Henry
Bangor	Marshall
Banks	Fayette
Banner	Woodbury
Barclay	Black Hawk
Barnes	Buena Vista
Barton	Worth
Bath	Cerro Gordo
Battle	Ida
Bear Creek	Poweshiek
Bear Grove	Cass
Bear Grove	Guthrie
Beaver	Boone
Beaver	Butler
Beaver	Dallas
Beaver	Grundy
Beaver	Guthrie
Beaver	Humboldt
Beaver	Polk
Bedford	Taylor
Belknap	Pottawattamie
Bellair	Appanoose
Bellevue	Jackson
Bellville	Pocahontas
Belmond	Wright
Belmont	Warren
Belvidere	Monona
Bennezette	Butler
Bennington	Black Hawk
Benton	Benton
Benton	Cass
Benton	Des Moines
Benton	Fremont
Benton	Keokuk
Benton	Lucas
Benton	Ringgold
Benton	Taylor
Benton	Wayne
Bertram	Linn
Bethel	Fayette
Big Creek	Black Hawk
Big Grove	Benton
Big Grove	Johnson
Bingham	Hancock
Black Hawk	Black Hawk
Black Hawk	Grundy
Black Hawk	Jefferson
Black Oak	Mahaska
Blaine	Ida
Blaine	Wright
Blairsburg	Hamilton
Bloomfield	Clinton
Bloomfield	Polk
Bloomfield	Winneshiek
Bloomington	Decatur
Bloomington	Muscatine
Blue Grass	Scott
Bluff Creek	Monroe
Bluffton	Winneshiek
Boardman	Clayton
Bonaparte	Van Buren
Boomer	Pottawattamie
Boone	Dallas
Boone	Hancock
Boone	Wright
Booth	Palo Alto
Boulder	Linn
Boyer	Crawford
Boyer	Harrison
Boyer Valley	Sac
Bradford	Chickasaw
Brandon	Jackson
Bremen	Delaware
Brighton	Cass
Brighton	Washington
Bristol	Greene
Bristol	Worth
Britt	Hancock
Brooke	Buena Vista
Brookfield	Clinton
Brookfield	Worth
Brown	Linn
Bruce	Benton
Buchanan	Jefferson
Buchanan	Page
Buckeye	Hardin
Buckingham	Tama
Buena Vista	Clayton
Buena Vista	Jasper
Buffalo	Buchanan
Buffalo	Kossuth
Buffalo	Linn
Buffalo	Scott
Buffalo	Winnebago
Buncombe	Sioux
Burnside	Webster
Burr Oak	Mitchell
Burr Oak	Winneshiek
Burrell	Decatur
Burt	Kossuth
Butler	Butler
Butler	Calhoun
Butler	Jackson
Butler	Scott
Byron	Buchanan
Caldwell	Appanoose
Caledonia	O'Brien
Calhoun	Calhoun
Calhoun	Harrison
Calmar	Winneshiek
Camanche	Clinton
Cameron	Audubon
Camp	Polk
Canaan	Henry
Canoe	Winneshiek
Canton	Benton
Capel	Sioux
Carl	Adams
Carlton	Tama
Carroll	O'Brien
Carroll	Tama
Carson	Pottawattamie
Cascade	Dubuque
Cass	Boone
Cass	Cass
Cass	Cedar
Cass	Clayton
Cass	Guthrie
Cass	Hamilton
Cass	Harrison
Cass	Jones
Cass	Shelby
Cass	Wapello
Castle Grove	Jones
Cedar	Benton
Cedar	Black Hawk
Cedar	Calhoun
Cedar	Cherokee
Cedar	Floyd
Cedar	Greene
Cedar	Jefferson
Cedar	Johnson
Cedar	Lee
Cedar	Lucas
Cedar	Mahaska
Cedar	Mitchell
Cedar	Monroe
Cedar	Muscatine
Cedar	Pocahontas
Cedar	Sac
Cedar	Van Buren
Cedar	Washington
Cedar Falls	Black Hawk
Centennial	Lyon
Center	Allamakee
Center	Calhoun
Center	Cedar
Center	Clinton
Center	Decatur
Center	Dubuque
Center	Emmet
Center	Fayette
Center	Henry
Center	Jefferson
Center	Mills
Center	Monona
Center	O'Brien
Center	Pocahontas
Center	Pottawattamie
Center	Shelby
Center	Sioux
Center	Wapello
Center	Winnebago
Center Grove	Dickinson
Chariton	Appanoose
Charleston	Lee
Charter Oak	Crawford
Chequest	Van Buren
Cherokee	Cherokee
Chester	Howard
Chester	Poweshiek
Chickasaw	Chickasaw
Cincinnati	Harrison
Clark	Tama
Clay	Clay
Clay	Grundy
Clay	Hardin
Clay	Harrison
Clay	Jones
Clay	Marion
Clay	Polk
Clay	Shelby
Clay	Washington
Clay	Wayne
Clay	Webster
Clayton	Clayton
Clayton	Taylor
Clear Creek	Jasper
Clear Creek	Johnson
Clear Creek	Keokuk
Clear Lake	Cerro Gordo
Clear Lake	Hamilton
Cleona	Scott
Clermont	Fayette
Cleveland	Davis
Cleveland	Lyon
Clinton	Linn
Clinton	Ringgold
Clinton	Sac
Clinton	Wayne
Coffins Grove	Delaware
Coldwater	Butler
Colfax	Boone
Colfax	Dallas
Colfax	Grundy
Colfax	Page
Colfax	Pocahontas
Colfax	Webster
College	Linn
Collins	Story
Colony	Adams
Colony	Delaware
Columbia	Tama
Columbia	Wapello
Columbus City	Louisa
Competine	Wapello
Concord	Dubuque
Concord	Hancock
Concord	Hardin
Concord	Louisa
Concord	Woodbury
Concordia	Des Moines
Cono	Buchanan
Cook	Sac
Coon	Buena Vista
Coon Valley	Sac
Cooper	Monona
Cooper	Webster
Corinth	Humboldt
Corwin	Ida
Corydon	Wayne
Cox Creek	Clayton
Crawford	Madison
Crawford	Washington
Crescent	Pottawattamie
Cresco	Kossuth
Crocker	Polk
Crystal	Hancock
Crystal	Tama
Cummins	Pocahontas
Dahlonega	Wapello
Dale	Lyon
Dale	O'Brien
Dallas	Dallas
Dallas	Marion
Dallas	Taylor
Danville	Des Moines
Danville	Worth
Dawson	Greene
Dayton	Bremer
Dayton	Butler
Dayton	Cedar
Dayton	Chickasaw
Dayton	Iowa
Dayton	Webster
Dayton	Wright
Decatur	Decatur
Decorah	Winneshiek
Deep Creek	Clinton
Deep River	Poweshiek
Deer Creek	Mills
Deer Creek	Webster
Deer Creek	Worth
Deerfield	Chickasaw
Delana	Humboldt
Delaware	Delaware
Delaware	Polk
Delaware	Sac
Delhi	Delaware
Denison	Crawford
Denmark	Emmet
Denmark	Lee
Des Moines	Boone
Des Moines	Dallas
Des Moines	Jasper
Des Moines	Jefferson
Des Moines	Lee
Des Moines	Pocahontas
Des Moines	Polk
Des Moines	Van Buren
DeWitt	Clinton
Diamond	Cherokee
Diamond Lake	Dickinson
Dodge	Boone
Dodge	Dubuque
Dodge	Guthrie
Dodge	Union
Doon	Lyon
Dougherty	Cerro Gordo
Douglas	Adams
Douglas	Appanoose
Douglas	Audubon
Douglas	Boone
Douglas	Bremer
Douglas	Clay
Douglas	Harrison
Douglas	Ida
Douglas	Madison
Douglas	Mitchell
Douglas	Montgomery
Douglas	Page
Douglas	Polk
Douglas	Sac
Douglas	Shelby
Douglas	Union
Douglas	Webster
Dover	Fayette
Dover	Pocahontas
Doyle	Clarke
Drakesville	Davis
Dresden	Chickasaw
Dubuque	Dubuque
Dutch Creek	Washington
Eagle	Black Hawk
Eagle	Kossuth
Eagle	Sioux
Eagle Grove	Wright
East	Montgomery
East Boyer	Crawford
East Des Moines	Mahaska
East Holman	Osceola
East Lancaster	Keokuk
East Lincoln	Mitchell
East Lucas	Johnson
East Orange	Sioux
East River	Page
East Waterloo	Black Hawk
Eden	Benton
Eden	Carroll
Eden	Clinton
Eden	Decatur
Eden	Fayette
Eden	Marshall
Eden	Sac
Eden	Winnebago
Edna	Cass
Eldora	Hardin
Eldorado	Benton
Elgin	Lyon
Elgin	Plymouth
Eliot	Louisa
Elk	Buena Vista
Elk	Clayton
Elk	Delaware
Elk Creek	Jasper
Elk River	Clinton
Elkhart	Polk
Elkhorn	Plymouth
Elkhorn	Webster
Ell	Hancock
Ellington	Hancock
Ellington	Palo Alto
Ellis	Hardin
Ellsworth	Emmet
Ellsworth	Hamilton
Elm Grove	Calhoun
Elm Grove	Louisa
Emmet	Emmet
Emmetsburg	Palo Alto
English	Iowa
English	Lucas
English River	Keokuk
English River	Washington
Erin	Hancock
Estherville	Emmet
Etna	Hardin
Eureka	Adair
Eureka	Sac
Ewoldt	Carroll
Excelsior	Dickinson
Exira	Audubon
Fabius	Davis
Fairbank	Buchanan
Fairfax	Linn
Fairfield	Buena Vista
Fairfield	Cedar
Fairfield	Fayette
Fairfield	Grundy
Fairfield	Jackson
Fairfield	Palo Alto
Fairview	Allamakee
Fairview	Jasper
Fairview	Jones
Fairview	Monona
Fairview	Osceola
Fairview	Shelby
Falls	Cerro Gordo
Farmers Creek	Jackson
Farmersburg	Clayton
Farmington	Cedar
Farmington	Van Buren
Fayette	Decatur
Fayette	Linn
Felix	Grundy
Fenton	Kossuth
Fern Valley	Palo Alto
Fertile	Worth
Fillmore	Iowa
Fisher	Fremont
Flint River	Des Moines
Florence	Benton
Floyd	Floyd
Floyd	O'Brien
Floyd	Sioux
Floyd	Woodbury
Forest	Winnebago
Forest City	Howard
Four Mile	Polk
Fox	Black Hawk
Fox River	Davis
Frankfort	Montgomery
Franklin	Allamakee
Franklin	Appanoose
Franklin	Bremer
Franklin	Cass
Franklin	Clarke
Franklin	Decatur
Franklin	Des Moines
Franklin	Greene
Franklin	Lee
Franklin	Linn
Franklin	Marion
Franklin	Monona
Franklin	Monroe
Franklin	O'Brien
Franklin	Polk
Franklin	Story
Franklin	Washington
Frankville	Winneshiek
Fredericksburg	Chickasaw
Frederika	Bremer
Fredonia	Plymouth
Freedom	Hamilton
Freedom	Palo Alto
Freeman	Clay
Fremont	Benton
Fremont	Bremer
Fremont	Buchanan
Fremont	Butler
Fremont	Cedar
Fremont	Clarke
Fremont	Fayette
Fremont	Hamilton
Fremont	Johnson
Fremont	Page
Fremont	Winneshiek
French Creek	Allamakee
Fruitland	Muscatine
Fulton	Muscatine
Fulton	Webster
Galva	Ida
Garden	Boone
Garden Grove	Decatur
Garfield	Calhoun
Garfield	Clay
Garfield	Hancock
Garfield	Ida
Garfield	Kossuth
Garfield	Lyon
Garfield	Mahaska
Garfield	Montgomery
Garfield	Plymouth
Garfield	Pocahontas
Garfield	Sioux
Garnavillo	Clayton
Garner	Pottawattamie
Gay	Taylor
Geneseo	Cerro Gordo
Geneseo	Tama
Geneva	Franklin
German	Grundy
German	Kossuth
Giard	Clayton
Gillett Grove	Clay
Gilman	Osceola
Glenwood	Mills
Glenwood	Winneshiek
Glidden	Carroll
Goewey	Osceola
Goodrich	Crawford
Goshen	Muscatine
Gower	Cedar
Gowrie	Webster
Graham	Johnson
Grand Meadow	Cherokee
Grand Meadow	Clayton
Grand River	Adair
Grand River	Decatur
Grand River	Madison
Grand River	Wayne
Grandview	Louisa
Grange	Woodbury
Grant	Adams
Grant	Boone
Grant	Buena Vista
Grant	Carroll
Grant	Cass
Grant	Cerro Gordo
Grant	Clinton
Grant	Dallas
Grant	Franklin
Grant	Greene
Grant	Grundy
Grant	Guthrie
Grant	Hardin
Grant	Ida
Grant	Kossuth
Grant	Linn
Grant	Lyon
Grant	Monona
Grant	Montgomery
Grant	O'Brien
Grant	Page
Grant	Plymouth
Grant	Pocahontas
Grant	Poweshiek
Grant	Ringgold
Grant	Sioux
Grant	Story
Grant	Tama
Grant	Taylor
Grant	Union
Grant	Winnebago
Grant	Woodbury
Grant	Wright
Great Oak	Palo Alto
Greeley	Audubon
Greeley	Shelby
Green	Fremont
Green	Wapello
Green Bay	Clarke
Green Bay	Lee
Greenbrier	Greene
Greencastle	Marshall
Greene	Iowa
Greenfield	Adair
Greenfield	Calhoun
Greenfield	Jones
Greenfield	Warren
Greenwood	Kossuth
Griggs	Ida
Grimes	Cerro Gordo
Grove	Adair
Grove	Cass
Grove	Davis
Grove	Humboldt
Grove	Pottawattamie
Grove	Shelby
Grove	Taylor
Grove	Worth
Guilford	Monroe
Hale	Jones
Hamilton	Decatur
Hamilton	Franklin
Hamilton	Hamilton
Hamlin	Audubon
Hampshire	Clinton
Hancock	Plymouth
Hanover	Allamakee
Hanover	Crawford
Hardin	Greene
Hardin	Hardin
Hardin	Johnson
Hardin	Pottawattamie
Hardin	Webster
Harlan	Fayette
Harlan	Page
Harrisburg	Van Buren
Harrison	Adair
Harrison	Benton
Harrison	Boone
Harrison	Harrison
Harrison	Kossuth
Harrison	Lee
Harrison	Mahaska
Harrison	Osceola
Hartford	Iowa
Hartland	Worth
Hartley	O'Brien
Hayes	Buena Vista
Hayes	Crawford
Hayes	Ida
Hazel Dell	Pottawattamie
Hazel Green	Delaware
Hazleton	Buchanan
Hebron	Kossuth
Henry	Plymouth
Henry	Van Buren
Herdland	Clay
Hesper	Winneshiek
Hickory Grove	Jasper
Hickory Grove	Scott
High Lake	Emmet
High Point	Decatur
Highland	Clayton
Highland	Greene
Highland	Guthrie
Highland	O'Brien
Highland	Palo Alto
Highland	Tama
Highland	Union
Highland	Wapello
Highland	Washington
Highland	Winneshiek
Hilton	Iowa
Holland	Sioux
Holt	Taylor
Homer	Benton
Homer	Buchanan
Honey Creek	Delaware
Honey Creek	Iowa
Horton	Osceola
Howard	Howard
Howard	Story
Howard	Tama
Howard	Wayne
Howard Center	Howard
Humboldt	Humboldt
Hungerford	Plymouth
Huron	Des Moines
Illyria	Fayette
Independence	Appanoose
Independence	Hamilton
Independence	Jasper
Independence	Palo Alto
Indian Creek	Mills
Indian Creek	Story
Indian Village	Tama
Indiana	Marion
Ingham	Franklin
Ingraham	Mills
Inland	Cedar
Iowa	Allamakee
Iowa	Benton
Iowa	Cedar
Iowa	Crawford
Iowa	Dubuque
Iowa	Iowa
Iowa	Jackson
Iowa	Washington
Iowa	Wright
Iowa Lake	Emmet
Irvington	Kossuth
Jack Creek	Emmet
Jackson	Adair
Jackson	Benton
Jackson	Boone
Jackson	Bremer
Jackson	Butler
Jackson	Calhoun
Jackson	Clarke
Jackson	Crawford
Jackson	Des Moines
Jackson	Greene
Jackson	Guthrie
Jackson	Hardin
Jackson	Harrison
Jackson	Henry
Jackson	Jackson
Jackson	Jones
Jackson	Keokuk
Jackson	Lee
Jackson	Linn
Jackson	Lucas
Jackson	Madison
Jackson	Monroe
Jackson	Poweshiek
Jackson	Sac
Jackson	Shelby
Jackson	Taylor
Jackson	Van Buren
Jackson	Warren
Jackson	Washington
Jackson	Wayne
Jackson	Webster
Jackson	Winneshiek
Jacksonville	Chickasaw
James	Pottawattamie
Jamestown	Howard
Jasper	Adams
Jasper	Carroll
Jefferson	Adair
Jefferson	Allamakee
Jefferson	Bremer
Jefferson	Buchanan
Jefferson	Butler
Jefferson	Clayton
Jefferson	Dubuque
Jefferson	Fayette
Jefferson	Harrison
Jefferson	Henry
Jefferson	Johnson
Jefferson	Lee
Jefferson	Louisa
Jefferson	Madison
Jefferson	Mahaska
Jefferson	Marshall
Jefferson	Polk
Jefferson	Poweshiek
Jefferson	Ringgold
Jefferson	Shelby
Jefferson	Taylor
Jefferson	Warren
Jefferson	Wayne
Jenkins	Mitchell
Johns	Appanoose
Johnson	Plymouth
Johnson	Webster
Jones	Union
Jordan	Monona
Julien	Dubuque
Junction	Greene
Kane	Benton
Kane	Pottawattamie
Kedron	Woodbury
Keg Creek	Pottawattamie
Kellogg	Jasper
Kendrick	Greene
Kennebec	Monona
Kensett	Worth
Keokuk	Wapello
King	Winnebago
Kniest	Carroll
Knox	Clarke
Knox	Pottawattamie
Knoxville	Marion
La Grange	Harrison
Lafayette	Allamakee
Lafayette	Bremer
Lafayette	Keokuk
Lafayette	Story
Lake	Cerro Gordo
Lake	Clay
Lake	Humboldt
Lake	Monona
Lake	Muscatine
Lake	Pocahontas
Lake	Pottawattamie
Lake	Wright
Lake Creek	Calhoun
Lake Prairie	Marion
Lakeport	Woodbury
Lakeville	Dickinson
Lansing	Allamakee
Larchwood	Lyon
Layton	Pottawattamie
Le Claire	Scott
Le Grand	Marshall
Le Roy	Bremer
Ledyard	Kossuth
Lee	Adair
Lee	Buena Vista
Lee	Franklin
Lee	Madison
Lee	Polk
Lenox	Iowa
Leroy	Audubon
Leroy	Benton
Lester	Black Hawk
Levey	Sac
Lewis	Pottawattamie
Liberal	Lyon
Liberty	Buchanan
Liberty	Cherokee
Liberty	Clarke
Liberty	Clinton
Liberty	Dubuque
Liberty	Hamilton
Liberty	Hancock
Liberty	Jefferson
Liberty	Johnson
Liberty	Keokuk
Liberty	Lucas
Liberty	Marion
Liberty	Marshall
Liberty	Mitchell
Liberty	O'Brien
Liberty	Plymouth
Liberty	Ringgold
Liberty	Scott
Liberty	Warren
Liberty	Woodbury
Liberty	Wright
Lick Creek	Davis
Lick Creek	Van Buren
Lime Creek	Cerro Gordo
Lime Creek	Washington
Lincoln	Adair
Lincoln	Adams
Lincoln	Appanoose
Lincoln	Audubon
Lincoln	Black Hawk
Lincoln	Buena Vista
Lincoln	Calhoun
Lincoln	Cass
Lincoln	Cerro Gordo
Lincoln	Clay
Lincoln	Dallas
Lincoln	Emmet
Lincoln	Grundy
Lincoln	Hamilton
Lincoln	Harrison
Lincoln	Iowa
Lincoln	Johnson
Lincoln	Kossuth
Lincoln	Lucas
Lincoln	Madison
Lincoln	Mahaska
Lincoln	Monona
Lincoln	Montgomery
Lincoln	O'Brien
Lincoln	Page
Lincoln	Plymouth
Lincoln	Pocahontas
Lincoln	Polk
Lincoln	Pottawattamie
Lincoln	Poweshiek
Lincoln	Ringgold
Lincoln	Scott
Lincoln	Shelby
Lincoln	Sioux
Lincoln	Story
Lincoln	Tama
Lincoln	Union
Lincoln	Warren
Lincoln	Winnebago
Lincoln	Winneshiek
Lincoln	Worth
Lincoln	Wright
Linden	Winnebago
Linn	Cedar
Linn	Dallas
Linn	Linn
Linn	Warren
Linton	Allamakee
Liscomb	Marshall
Liston	Woodbury
Little Sioux	Harrison
Little Sioux	Woodbury
Lizard	Pocahontas
Lloyd	Dickinson
Lockridge	Jefferson
Locust Grove	Fremont
Locust Grove	Jefferson
Lodomillo	Clayton
Logan	Calhoun
Logan	Clay
Logan	Ida
Logan	Lyon
Logan	Marshall
Logan	Sioux
Logan	Winnebago
Lone Tree	Clay
Long Creek	Decatur
Lost Grove	Webster
Lost Island	Palo Alto
Lotts Creek	Kossuth
Lotts Creek	Ringgold
Lovell	Jones
Lu Verne	Kossuth
Ludlow	Allamakee
Lynn	Sioux
Lynn Grove	Jasper
Lyon	Hamilton
Lyon	Lyon
Lyons	Mills
Macedonia	Pottawattamie
Madison	Buchanan
Madison	Butler
Madison	Clarke
Madison	Fremont
Madison	Hancock
Madison	Johnson
Madison	Jones
Madison	Lee
Madison	Madison
Madison	Mahaska
Madison	Polk
Madison	Poweshiek
Madison	Winneshiek
Magnolia	Harrison
Magor	Hancock
Maine	Linn
Makee	Allamakee
Malaka	Jasper
Malcom	Poweshiek
Mallory	Clayton
Mantua	Monroe
Maple	Ida
Maple	Monona
Maple River	Carroll
Maple Valley	Buena Vista
Maquoketa	Jackson
Marcus	Cherokee
Marcy	Boone
Marengo	Iowa
Marietta	Marshall
Marion	Clayton
Marion	Davis
Marion	Franklin
Marion	Hamilton
Marion	Henry
Marion	Lee
Marion	Linn
Marion	Marshall
Marion	Plymouth
Marion	Washington
Mariposa	Jasper
Marshall	Louisa
Marshall	Pocahontas
Marshall	Taylor
Mason	Cerro Gordo
Mason	Taylor
Massena	Cass
Massillon	Cedar
Maxfield	Bremer
Meadow	Clay
Meadow	Plymouth
Melrose	Grundy
Melville	Audubon
Mendon	Clayton
Mercer	Adams
Middle Fork	Ringgold
Middlefield	Buchanan
Midland	Lyon
Milford	Crawford
Milford	Dickinson
Milford	Story
Military	Winneshiek
Miller	Woodbury
Millville	Clayton
Milo	Delaware
Minden	Pottawattamie
Minerva	Marshall
Mitchell	Mitchell
Monmouth	Jackson
Monona	Clayton
Monroe	Benton
Monroe	Butler
Monroe	Fremont
Monroe	Johnson
Monroe	Linn
Monroe	Madison
Monroe	Mahaska
Monroe	Monroe
Monroe	Ringgold
Monroe	Shelby
Monroe	Wayne
Montpelier	Muscatine
Montrose	Lee
Morgan	Crawford
Morgan	Decatur
Morgan	Franklin
Morgan	Harrison
Morgan	Woodbury
Morning Sun	Louisa
Morton	Page
Mosalem	Dubuque
Moscow	Muscatine
Mott	Franklin
Mound Prairie	Jasper
Mount Valley	Winnebago
Mount Vernon	Black Hawk
Mount Vernon	Cerro Gordo
Moville	Woodbury
Nassau	Sioux
Nebraska	Page
Neola	Pottawattamie
Nevada	Palo Alto
Nevada	Story
New Albany	Story
New Buda	Decatur
New Hampton	Chickasaw
New Hope	Union
New London	Henry
New Oregon	Howard
New Wine	Dubuque
Newark	Webster
Newburg	Mitchell
Newell	Buena Vista
Newport	Johnson
Newton	Buchanan
Newton	Carroll
Newton	Jasper
Newton	Winnebago
Niles	Floyd
Nishnabotny	Crawford
Noble	Cass
Nodaway	Adams
Nodaway	Page
Nodaway	Taylor
Nokomis	Buena Vista
North Fork	Delaware
Norwalk	Pottawattamie
Norway	Humboldt
Norway	Winnebago
Norway	Wright
Oak	Mills
Oak Dale	Howard
Oakfield	Audubon
Oakland	Franklin
Oakland	Louisa
Ocheyedan	Osceola
Ohio	Madison
Okoboji	Dickinson
Olive	Clinton
Omega	O'Brien
Oneida	Delaware
Oneida	Tama
Oran	Fayette
Orange	Black Hawk
Orange	Clinton
Orange	Guthrie
Oregon	Washington
Orient	Adair
Orleans	Winneshiek
Orono	Muscatine
Orthel	Hancock
Osage	Mitchell
Osceola	Clarke
Osceola	Franklin
Otho	Webster
Oto	Woodbury
Otranto	Mitchell
Otter	Warren
Otter Creek	Crawford
Otter Creek	Jackson
Otter Creek	Linn
Otter Creek	Lucas
Otter Creek	Tama
Owen	Cerro Gordo
Oxford	Johnson
Oxford	Jones
Paint Creek	Allamakee
Palermo	Grundy
Palestine	Story
Palmyra	Warren
Palo Alto	Jasper
Paradise	Crawford
Paris	Howard
Paton	Greene
Penn	Guthrie
Penn	Jefferson
Penn	Johnson
Penn	Madison
Peoples	Boone
Perry	Buchanan
Perry	Davis
Perry	Jackson
Perry	Plymouth
Perry	Tama
Peru	Dubuque
Peterson	Clay
Pierce	Page
Pike	Muscatine
Pilot	Cherokee
Pilot	Iowa
Pilot Grove	Montgomery
Pilot Mound	Boone
Pioneer	Cedar
Pitcher	Cherokee
Pittsford	Butler
Plank	Keokuk
Plato	Sioux
Platte	Taylor
Platte	Union
Plattville	Mills
Pleasant	Appanoose
Pleasant	Cass
Pleasant	Hardin
Pleasant	Lucas
Pleasant	Monroe
Pleasant	Pottawattamie
Pleasant	Poweshiek
Pleasant	Union
Pleasant	Wapello
Pleasant	Winneshiek
Pleasant	Wright
Pleasant Grove	Des Moines
Pleasant Grove	Floyd
Pleasant Grove	Mahaska
Pleasant Grove	Marion
Pleasant Ridge	Lee
Pleasant Valley	Carroll
Pleasant Valley	Cerro Gordo
Pleasant Valley	Fayette
Pleasant Valley	Grundy
Pleasant Valley	Johnson
Pleasant Valley	Scott
Pleasant Valley	Webster
Plum Creek	Kossuth
Plymouth	Plymouth
Poe	Ringgold
Poland	Buena Vista
Polk	Benton
Polk	Bremer
Polk	Jefferson
Polk	Shelby
Polk	Taylor
Polk	Wapello
Port Louisa	Louisa
Portland	Cerro Gordo
Portland	Kossuth
Portland	Plymouth
Post	Allamakee
Poweshiek	Jasper
Powhatan	Pocahontas
Poyner	Black Hawk
Prairie	Davis
Prairie	Delaware
Prairie	Fremont
Prairie	Keokuk
Prairie	Kossuth
Prairie	Mahaska
Prairie Creek	Dubuque
Prairie Springs	Jackson
Prescott	Adams
Preston	Plymouth
Princeton	Scott
Providence	Buena Vista
Providence	Hardin
Prussia	Adair
Putnam	Fayette
Putnam	Linn
Pymosa	Cass
Quincy	Adams
Raglan	Harrison
Ramsey	Kossuth
Rawles	Mills
Read	Clayton
Reading	Calhoun
Reading	Sioux
Red Oak	Cedar
Red Oak	Montgomery
Red Rock	Marion
Reeve	Franklin
Remsen	Plymouth
Rice	Ringgold
Richland	Adair
Richland	Carroll
Richland	Chickasaw
Richland	Decatur
Richland	Delaware
Richland	Dickinson
Richland	Franklin
Richland	Guthrie
Richland	Jackson
Richland	Jasper
Richland	Jones
Richland	Keokuk
Richland	Lyon
Richland	Mahaska
Richland	Sac
Richland	Story
Richland	Tama
Richland	Wapello
Richland	Warren
Richman	Wayne
Riley	Ringgold
Ripley	Butler
Riverdale	Kossuth
Riverside	Fremont
Riverside	Lyon
Riverton	Clay
Riverton	Floyd
Riverton	Fremont
Rochester	Cedar
Rock	Cherokee
Rock	Lyon
Rock	Mitchell
Rock	Sioux
Rock	Woodbury
Rock Creek	Jasper
Rock Grove	Floyd
Rockford	Floyd
Rockford	Pottawattamie
Roland	Webster
Rome	Jones
Roosevelt	Pocahontas
Roscoe	Davis
Rose Grove	Hamilton
Roselle	Carroll
Ross	Franklin
Ross	Taylor
Round Prairie	Jefferson
Rudd	Floyd
Rush Lake	Palo Alto
Rutland	Humboldt
Rutland	Woodbury
Sac	Sac
St. Ansgar	Mitchell
St. Charles	Floyd
St. Clair	Benton
St. Clair	Monona
St. Johns	Harrison
St. Marys	Mills
Salem	Henry
Salt Creek	Davis
Salt Creek	Tama
Sand Creek	Union
Saratoga	Howard
Saylor	Polk
Scotch Grove	Jones
Scott	Buena Vista
Scott	Fayette
Scott	Floyd
Scott	Franklin
Scott	Fremont
Scott	Hamilton
Scott	Henry
Scott	Johnson
Scott	Madison
Scott	Mahaska
Scott	Montgomery
Scott	Poweshiek
Scranton	Greene
Seely	Guthrie
Seneca	Kossuth
Settlers	Sioux
Seventy-Six	Muscatine
Seventy-Six	Washington
Sharon	Appanoose
Sharon	Audubon
Sharon	Clinton
Sharon	Johnson
Shelby	Shelby
Shell Rock	Butler
Sheridan	Carroll
Sheridan	Cherokee
Sheridan	Poweshiek
Sheridan	Scott
Sheridan	Sioux
Sherman	Calhoun
Sherman	Hardin
Sherman	Jasper
Sherman	Kossuth
Sherman	Monona
Sherman	Montgomery
Sherman	Pocahontas
Sherman	Sioux
Sherman	Story
Shiloh	Grundy
Sidney	Fremont
Sigourney	Keokuk
Silver	Cherokee
Silver Creek	Ida
Silver Creek	Mills
Silver Creek	Pottawattamie
Silver Lake	Dickinson
Silver Lake	Palo Alto
Silver Lake	Worth
Sioux	Clay
Sioux	Lyon
Sioux	Monona
Sioux	Plymouth
Sioux	Sioux
Sloan	Woodbury
Smithfield	Fayette
Soap Creek	Davis
Soldier	Crawford
Soldier	Monona
South	Madison
South Fork	Delaware
South Fork	Jackson
South Fork	Wayne
Spaulding	Union
Sperry	Clayton
Spirit Lake	Dickinson
Spring	Cherokee
Spring Creek	Black Hawk
Spring Creek	Mahaska
Spring Creek	Tama
Spring Grove	Linn
Spring Rock	Clinton
Spring Valley	Dallas
Spring Valley	Monona
Springdale	Cedar
Springfield	Cedar
Springfield	Kossuth
Springfield	Winneshiek
Squaw	Warren
Stacyville	Mitchell
Stanton	Plymouth
Stapleton	Chickasaw
State Center	Marshall
Steady Run	Keokuk
Stockholm	Crawford
Stuart	Guthrie
Sugar Creek	Cedar
Sugar Creek	Poweshiek
Sugar Grove	Dallas
Summerset	Adair
Summit	Adair
Summit	Clay
Summit	Marion
Summit	O'Brien
Sumner	Buchanan
Sumner	Iowa
Sumner	Webster
Sumner	Winneshiek
Sumner No. 2	Bremer
Superior	Dickinson
Swan Lake	Emmet
Swan Lake	Pocahontas
Swea	Kossuth
Sweetland	Muscatine
Table Mound	Dubuque
Tama	Des Moines
Tama	Tama
Tarkio	Page
Taylor	Allamakee
Taylor	Appanoose
Taylor	Benton
Taylor	Dubuque
Taylor	Harrison
Taylor	Marshall
Tete Des Morts	Jackson
Thompson	Guthrie
Tilden	Cherokee
Timber Creek	Marshall
Tingley	Ringgold
Tippecanoe	Henry
Tipton	Hardin
Toledo	Tama
Trenton	Henry
Troy	Clarke
Troy	Iowa
Troy	Monroe
Troy	Wright
Twelve Mile Lake	Emmet
Twin Lake	Hancock
Twin Lakes	Calhoun
Udell	Appanoose
Ulster	Floyd
Union	Adair
Union	Adams
Union	Appanoose
Union	Benton
Union	Black Hawk
Union	Boone
Union	Calhoun
Union	Carroll
Union	Cass
Union	Cerro Gordo
Union	Crawford
Union	Dallas
Union	Davis
Union	Delaware
Union	Des Moines
Union	Fayette
Union	Floyd
Union	Guthrie
Union	Hardin
Union	Harrison
Union	Jackson
Union	Johnson
Union	Kossuth
Union	Louisa
Union	Lucas
Union	Madison
Union	Mahaska
Union	Marion
Union	Mitchell
Union	Monroe
Union	O'Brien
Union	Plymouth
Union	Polk
Union	Poweshiek
Union	Ringgold
Union	Shelby
Union	Story
Union	Union
Union	Van Buren
Union	Warren
Union	Wayne
Union	Woodbury
Union	Worth
Union City	Allamakee
Union Prairie	Allamakee
Urbana	Monroe
Utica	Chickasaw
Valley	Guthrie
Valley	Page
Valley	Pottawattamie
Van Buren	Jackson
Van Buren	Keokuk
Van Buren	Lee
Van Buren	Van Buren
Van Meter	Dallas
Vermillion	Appanoose
Vernon	Dubuque
Vernon	Humboldt
Vernon	Palo Alto
Vernon	Van Buren
Vernon	Wright
Vernon Springs	Howard
Victoria	Cass
Victory	Guthrie
Vienna	Marshall
Village	Van Buren
Viola	Audubon
Viola	Osceola
Viola	Sac
Virginia	Warren
Volga	Clayton
Wacousta	Humboldt
Wagner	Clayton
Wall Lake	Sac
Wall Lake	Wright
Walnut	Adair
Walnut	Appanoose
Walnut	Dallas
Walnut	Fremont
Walnut	Jefferson
Walnut	Madison
Walnut	Palo Alto
Walnut	Polk
Walnut	Wayne
Wapello	Louisa
Wapsinonoc	Muscatine
Ward	Clarke
Warren	Bremer
Warren	Keokuk
Warren	Lucas
Warren	Poweshiek
Warren	Story
Warren	Wayne
Washington	Adair
Washington	Adams
Washington	Appanoose
Washington	Black Hawk
Washington	Bremer
Washington	Buchanan
Washington	Buena Vista
Washington	Butler
Washington	Carroll
Washington	Cass
Washington	Chickasaw
Washington	Clarke
Washington	Clinton
Washington	Crawford
Washington	Dallas
Washington	Des Moines
Washington	Dubuque
Washington	Fremont
Washington	Greene
Washington	Grundy
Washington	Harrison
Washington	Iowa
Washington	Jackson
Washington	Jasper
Washington	Johnson
Washington	Jones
Washington	Keokuk
Washington	Lee
Washington	Linn
Washington	Lucas
Washington	Marion
Washington	Marshall
Washington	Montgomery
Washington	Page
Washington	Plymouth
Washington	Polk
Washington	Pottawattamie
Washington	Poweshiek
Washington	Ringgold
Washington	Shelby
Washington	Sioux
Washington	Story
Washington	Taylor
Washington	Van Buren
Washington	Wapello
Washington	Washington
Washington	Wayne
Washington	Webster
Washington	Winneshiek
Waterford	Clay
Waterford	Clinton
Waterloo	Allamakee
Waterman	O'Brien
Waubonsie	Ringgold
Waveland	Pottawattamie
Wayne	Henry
Wayne	Jones
Wayne	Mitchell
Wayne	Monroe
Weaver	Humboldt
Webster	Hamilton
Webster	Madison
Webster	Polk
Webster	Webster
Welcome	Sioux
Wells	Appanoose
Welton	Clinton
Wesley	Kossuth
West	Montgomery
West Bend	Palo Alto
West Branch	Sioux
West Des Moines	Mahaska
West Fork	Franklin
West Fork	Monona
West Fork	Woodbury
West Grove	Davis
West Holman	Osceola
West Lancaster	Keokuk
West Lincoln	Mitchell
West Lucas	Johnson
West Point	Butler
West Point	Lee
West Side	Crawford
Westburg	Buchanan
Westfield	Fayette
Westfield	Plymouth
Westphalia	Shelby
Westport	Dickinson
Wheatland	Carroll
Wheeler	Lyon
Wheeler	Sac
White Breast	Warren
White Cloud	Mills
White Oak	Mahaska
White Oak	Warren
Whitebreast	Lucas
Whitewater	Dubuque
Whittemore	Kossuth
Williams	Calhoun
Williams	Hamilton
Willow	Cherokee
Willow	Crawford
Willow	Greene
Willow	Monona
Willow	Woodbury
Wilson	Osceola
Wilton	Muscatine
Windsor	Fayette
Winfield	Scott
Wisner	Franklin
Wolf Creek	Woodbury
Woodbury	Woodbury
Woodland	Decatur
Woolstock	Wright
Worth	Boone
Wright	Pottawattamie
Wright	Wayne
Wyacondah	Davis
Wyoming	Jones
Yell	Boone
Yell	Webster
Yellow Springs	Des Moines
York	Iowa
York	Pottawattamie
York	Tama

== See also ==
- List of townships in Iowa by county
- List of counties in Iowa
- List of cities in Iowa
