= Sherman Township, Iowa =

Sherman Township is the name of a number of places in the U.S. state of Iowa:

- Sherman Township, Calhoun County, Iowa
- Sherman Township, Hardin County, Iowa
- Sherman Township, Jasper County, Iowa
- Sherman Township, Kossuth County, Iowa
- Sherman Township, Monona County, Iowa, Monona County, Iowa
- Sherman Township, Montgomery County, Iowa
- Sherman Township, Pocahontas County, Iowa
- Sherman Township, Sioux County, Iowa, Sioux County, Iowa
- Sherman Township, Story County, Iowa

== See also ==
- Sherman Township (disambiguation)
