= Castana, Iowa =

- City
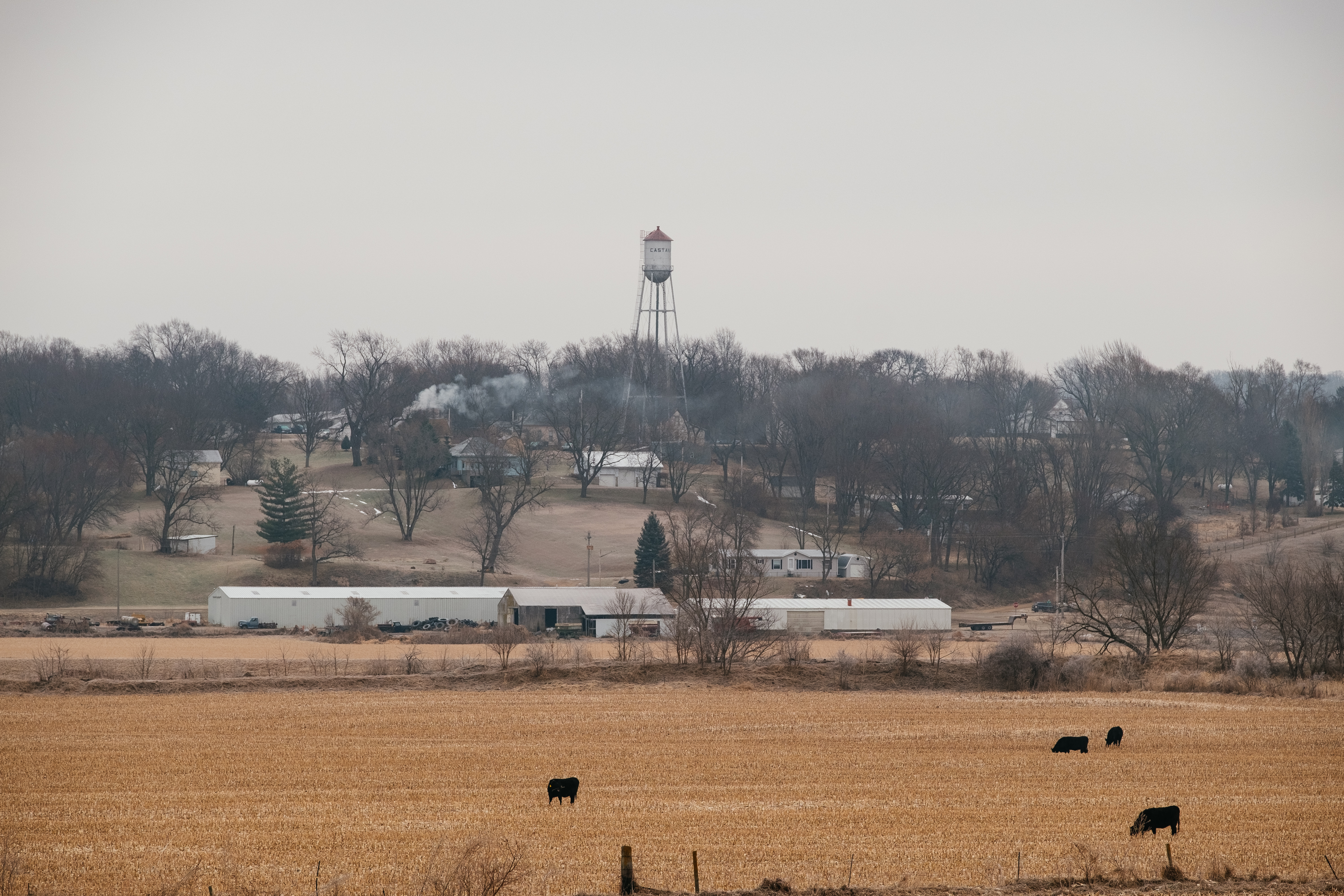
- Castana viewed from the west

- Location of Castana, Iowa
- Coordinates: 42°04′24″N 95°54′37″W
- Country: USA
- State: Iowa
- County: Monona

Area
  - Total: 0.91 sq mi (2.35 km^{2})
  - Land: 0.91 sq mi (2.35 km^{2})
  - Water: 0 sq mi (0.00 km^{2})
- Elevation: 1,132 ft (345 m)

Population (2020)
  - Total: 107
  - Density: 117.9/sq mi (45.53/km^{2})
- Time zone: UTC-6 (Central (CST))
  - Summer (DST): UTC-5 (CDT)
- ZIP code: 51010
- Area code: 712
- FIPS code: 19-11530
- GNIS feature ID: 2393771
- Website: City website

Castana is a city in Monona County, Iowa, United States. The population was 107 at the time of the 2020 census.

== History ==
A post office has been in operation at Castana since 1865. Castana was platted in 1886 by the railroad. The name Castana was selected by an early settler who believed it to be a Latin word meaning "chestnuts".

== Geography ==
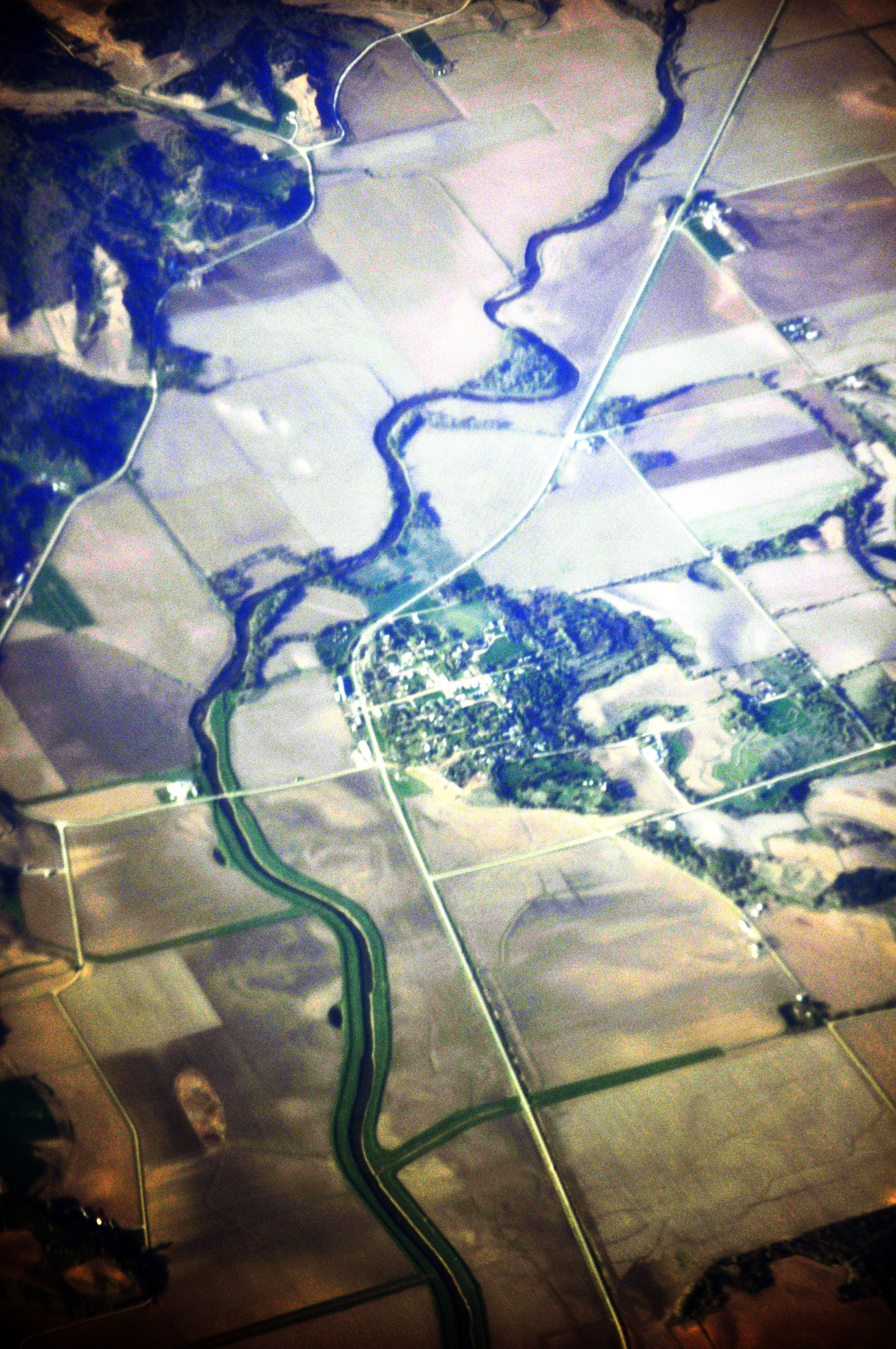
Aerial photograph of Castana, Iowa, 2012

According to the United States Census Bureau, the city has a total area of 0.93 square miles (2.41 km^{2}), all land. The city is located 10 miles (16 km) from Onawa and 39 miles (63 km) from Sioux City.

== Academic research ==
The Western Iowa Experimental farm, a part of Iowa State University, is located just outside Castana. There research is carried out in beef cattle, swine, forage and the effects of fertiliser on soya beans and corn.

== Demographics ==
Historical populations
Year	Pop.	±%
1900	355	—
1910	364	+2.5%
1920	389	+6.9%
1930	334	−14.1%
1940	336	+0.6%
1950	265	−21.1%
1960	230	−13.2%
1970	211	−8.3%
1980	228	+8.1%
1990	159	−30.3%
2000	178	+11.9%
2010	147	−17.4%
2020	107	−27.2%
Source:"U.S. Census website". United States Census Bureau. and Iowa Data Center; Source: U.S. Decennial Census

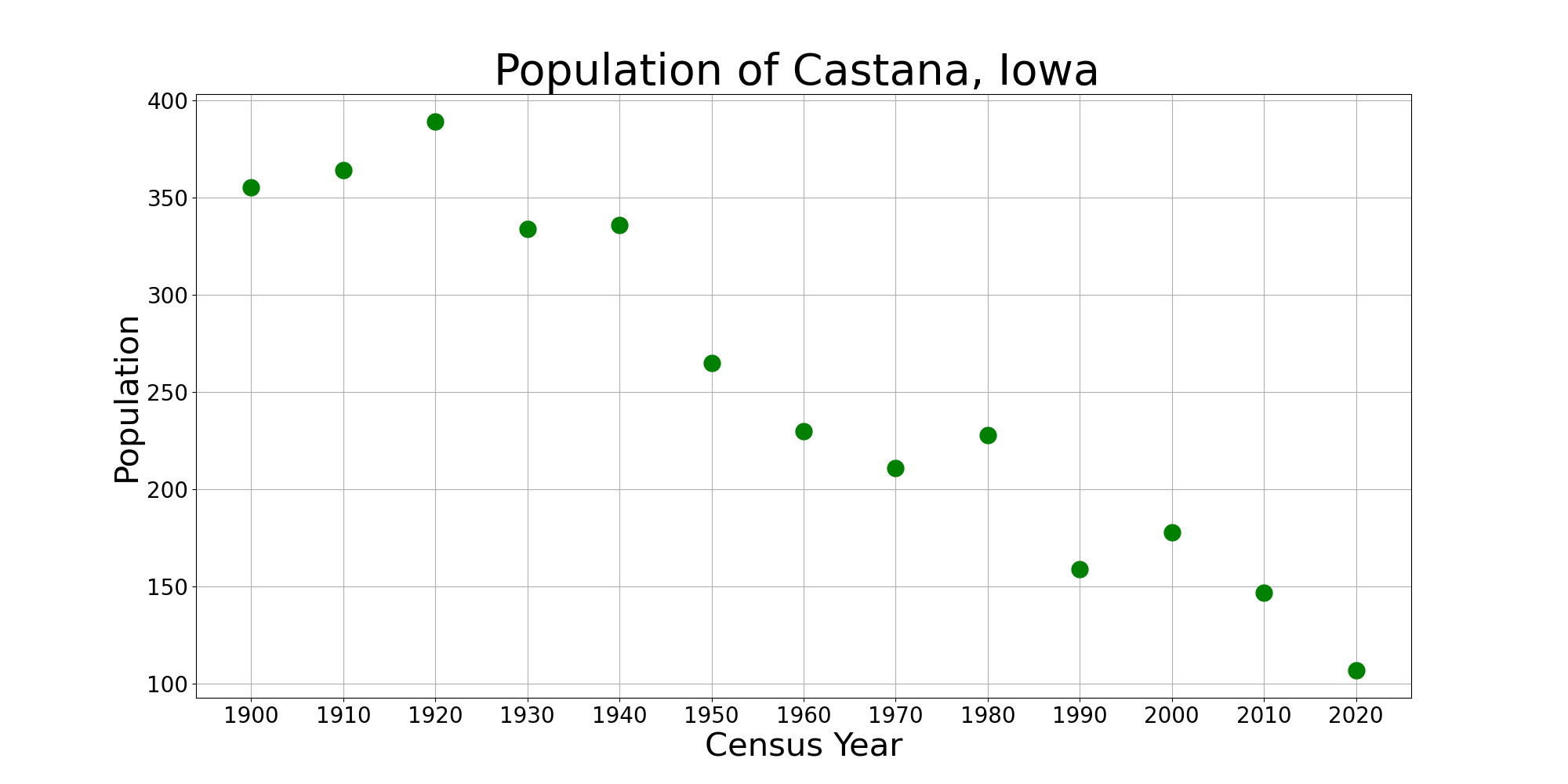
The population of Castana, Iowa from US census data

=== 2020 census ===
As of the census of 2020, there were 107 people, 51 households, and 34 families residing in the city. The population density was 117.9 inhabitants per square mile (45.5/km^{2}). There were 63 housing units at an average density of 69.4 per square mile (26.8/km^{2}). The racial makeup of the city was 92.5% White, 0.0% Black or African American, 0.0% Native American, 0.0% Asian, 0.0% Pacific Islander, 1.9% from other races and 5.6% from two or more races. Hispanic or Latino persons of any race comprised 2.8% of the population.

Of the 51 households, 19.6% of which had children under the age of 18 living with them, 39.2% were married couples living together, 15.7% were cohabitating couples, 25.5% had a female householder with no spouse or partner present and 19.6% had a male householder with no spouse or partner present. 33.3% of all households were non-families. 21.6% of all households were made up of individuals, 17.6% had someone living alone who was 65 years old or older.

The median age in the city was 49.5 years. 22.4% of the residents were under the age of 20; 3.7% were between the ages of 20 and 24; 20.6% were from 25 and 44; 21.5% were from 45 and 64; and 31.8% were 65 years of age or older. The gender makeup of the city was 44.9% male and 55.1% female.

=== 2010 census ===
As of the census of 2010, there were 147 people, 68 households, and 37 families residing in the city. The population density was 158.1 inhabitants per square mile (61.0/km^{2}). There were 78 housing units at an average density of 83.9 per square mile (32.4/km^{2}). The racial makeup of the city was 100.0% White. Hispanic or Latino of any race were 0.7% of the population.

There were 68 households, of which 29.4% had children under the age of 18 living with them, 41.2% were married couples living together, 8.8% had a female householder with no husband present, 4.4% had a male householder with no wife present, and 45.6% were non-families. 42.6% of all households were made up of individuals, and 7.3% had someone living alone who was 65 years of age or older. The average household size was 2.16 and the average family size was 2.89.

The median age in the city was 38.3 years. 26.5% of residents were under the age of 18; 8.9% were between the ages of 18 and 24; 17.7% were from 25 to 44; 33.3% were from 45 to 64; and 13.6% were 65 years of age or older. The gender makeup of the city was 53.7% male and 46.3% female.

=== 2000 census ===
As of the census of 2000, there were 178 people, 77 households, and 47 families residing in the city. The population density was 192.2 inhabitants per square mile (74.2/km^{2}). There were 84 housing units at an average density of 90.7 per square mile (35.0/km^{2}). The racial makeup of the city was 98.31% White, 1.12% Native American and 0.56% Pacific Islander.

There were 77 households, out of which 31.2% had children under the age of 18 living with them, 45.5% were married couples living together, 7.8% had a female householder with no husband present, and 37.7% were non-families. 32.5% of all households were made up of individuals, and 14.3% had someone living alone who was 65 years of age or older. The average household size was 2.31 and the average family size was 2.94.

In the city, the population was spread out, with 29.2% under the age of 18, 6.2% from 18 to 24, 21.9% from 25 to 44, 25.3% from 45 to 64, and 17.4% who were 65 years of age or older. The median age was 38 years. For every 100 females, there were 104.6 males. For every 100 females age 18 and over, there were 100.0 males.

The median income for a household in the city was $25,000, and the median income for a family was $32,500. Males had a median income of $24,000 versus $15,417 for females. The per capita income for the city was $12,327. About 20.4% of families and 25.0% of the population were below the poverty line, including 36.9% of those under the age of eighteen and 13.3% of those 65 or over.

== Education ==
Castana is within the Maple Valley–Anthon–Oto Community School District.

The community was originally a part of the Castana Consolidated Independent School District. The lower level of a building constructed in 1888 was the first classroom area. In 1897 a permanent $12,000, three story Castana Normal School building opened. An addition was completed in Summer 1911. The school district acquired a teacher's residence hall in 1920; that building also housed classes for several grades.

In 1935 and 1936 the Castana Consolidated School, the final school building in Castana, was built by the Sioux City company Beuttler & Arnold, funded by a $36,818 Public Works Administration grant and a $45,000 bond. It opened for classes on September 7, 1936. In November of that year the school district sold the previous school to the city government for $1,000, and the building was razed. The 1935–1936 school was renamed the Castana Community School in 1954.

The district began sending high school students to the Maple Valley Community School District in Mapleton and to Onawa in fall 1962. Castana joined the Maple Valley district along with Danbury in 1968. The merged district did not use the teacher's residence and sold it in 1970. On July 1, 2012, the Maple Valley district consolidated with the Anthon–Oto Community School District to form the new Maple Valley–Anthon–Oto district.

== Notable people ==
- Richard D. Kisling; served as the third Chief Master Sergeant of the Air Force
- Dale Swanson, racing driver
