= Albaton, Iowa =

- Unincorporated community
- Location within Iowa
- Coordinates: 42°11′08″N 96°17′27″W
- Country: United States
- State: Iowa
- County: Monona
- Elevation: 1,070 ft (330 m)
- Time zone: UTC-6 (Central (CST))
  - Summer (DST): UTC-5 (CDT)
- Area code: 712
- GNIS feature ID: 454112

Albaton is an unincorporated community in Fairview Township, Monona County, Iowa, United States.

== Geography ==
Albaton is located in the northwest corner of the county, 4.8 miles (7.7 km) southwest of Sloan.

== History ==
The post office at Albaton was established in 1877.

In 1890, Albaton was described as a post-village of about 25 residents. According to the History of Monona County, Iowa, at that time, Albaton had "two stores, kept respectively by Jonathan Polly and P. M. Dubois. The other businessmen of the place are: Victor Dubois, livestock dealer and Postmaster; Samuel Polly, physician; Nels Sollen, blacksmith; Nels Brenden, carpenter; W.M. Stanley and C.A. Weinder, Justices of the Peace, and A. H. Strand, Notary Public."

The Lutheran Church at Albaton was organized in the fall of 1868. Services were held in the schoolhouse until 1885, when a separate church building was constructed. A separate congregation, called the Fairview Lutheran Congregation, existed at that time; this congregation worshipped at the schoolhouse.

The post office closed in 1901.

Albaton's population was 44 in 1902, and 27 in 1925. The population was 15 in 1940.

== See also ==
- Preparation, Iowa
