= Rodney, Iowa =

- City
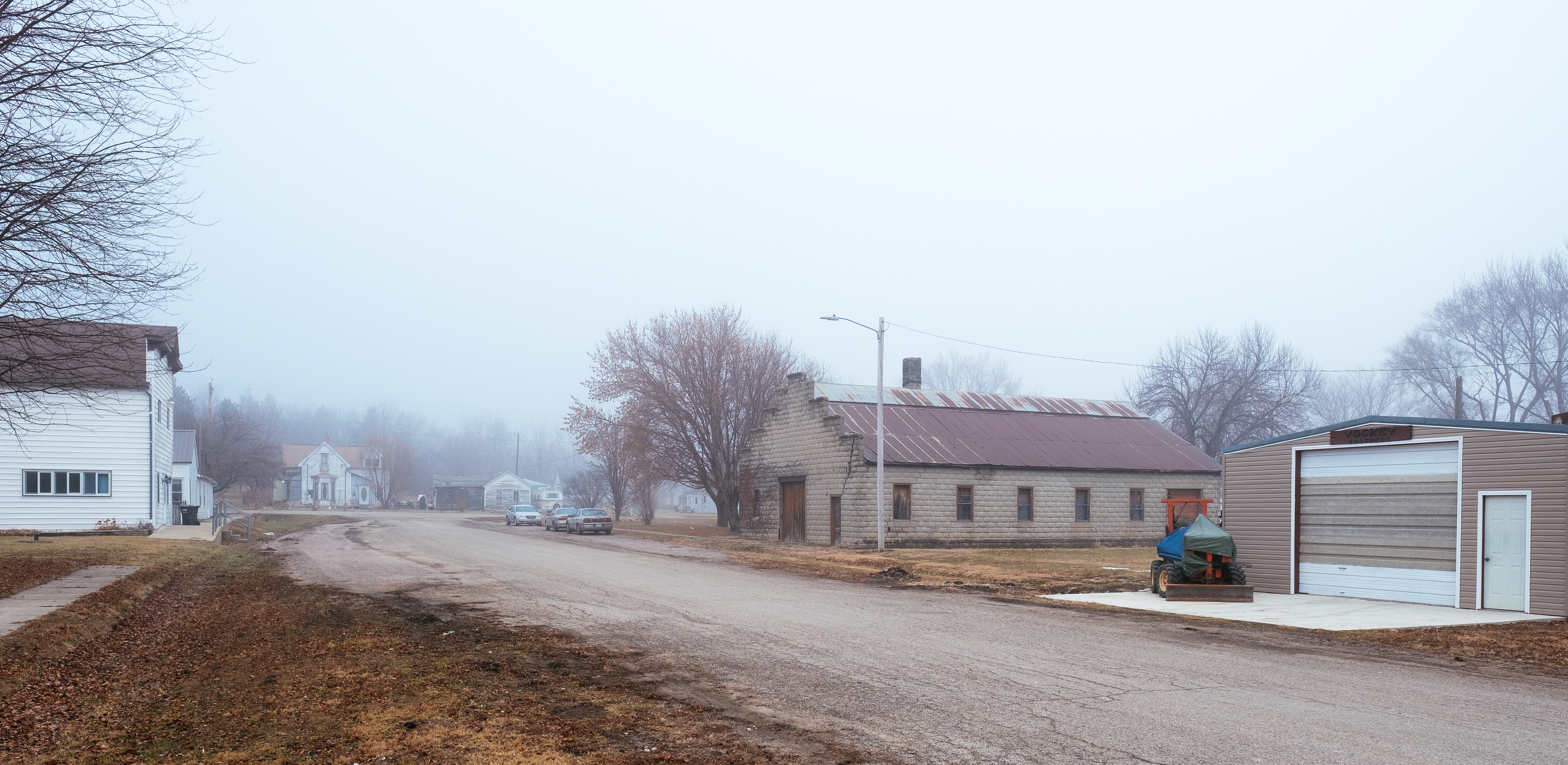
- Main Street

- Location of Rodney, Iowa
- Coordinates: 42°12′16″N 95°57′03″W
- Country: USA
- State: Iowa
- County: Monona

Area
  - Total: 0.15 sq mi (0.39 km^{2})
  - Land: 0.15 sq mi (0.39 km^{2})
  - Water: 0 sq mi (0.00 km^{2})
- Elevation: 1,096 ft (334 m)

Population (2020)
  - Total: 45
  - Density: 296.1/sq mi (114.31/km^{2})
- Time zone: UTC-6 (Central (CST))
  - Summer (DST): UTC-5 (CDT)
- ZIP code: 51051
- Area code: 712
- FIPS code: 19-68385
- GNIS feature ID: 2396414

Rodney is a city in Monona County, Iowa, United States. The population was 45 at the time of the 2020 census.

== Geography ==
According to the United States Census Bureau, the city has a total area of 0.16 square miles (0.41 km^{2}), all land.

== Demographics ==
Historical populations
Year	Pop.	±%
1900	173	—
1910	163	−5.8%
1920	176	+8.0%
1930	150	−14.8%
1940	131	−12.7%
1950	127	−3.1%
1960	94	−26.0%
1970	66	−29.8%
1980	82	+24.2%
1990	71	−13.4%
2000	74	+4.2%
2010	60	−18.9%
2020	45	−25.0%
Source:"U.S. Census website". United States Census Bureau. and Iowa Data Center; Source: U.S. Decennial Census

=== 2020 census ===
As of the census of 2020, there were 45 people, 26 households, and 18 families residing in the city. The population density was 296.1 inhabitants per square mile (114.3/km^{2}). There were 26 housing units at an average density of 171.1 per square mile (66.0/km^{2}). The racial makeup of the city was 95.6% White, 0.0% Black or African American, 0.0% Native American, 0.0% Asian, 0.0% Pacific Islander, 0.0% from other races and 4.4% from two or more races. Hispanic or Latino persons of any race comprised 0.0% of the population.

Of the 26 households, 46.2% of which had children under the age of 18 living with them, 38.5% were married couples living together, 3.8% were cohabitating couples, 23.1% had a female householder with no spouse or partner present and 34.6% had a male householder with no spouse or partner present. 30.8% of all households were non-families. 30.8% of all households were made up of individuals, 15.4% had someone living alone who was 65 years old or older.

The median age in the city was 55.8 years. 15.6% of the residents were under the age of 20; 4.4% were between the ages of 20 and 24; 13.3% were from 25 and 44; 33.3% were from 45 and 64; and 33.3% were 65 years of age or older. The gender makeup of the city was 55.6% male and 44.4% female.

=== 2010 census ===
As of the census of 2010, there were 60 people, 29 households, and 17 families residing in the city. The population density was 375.0 inhabitants per square mile (144.8/km^{2}). There were 31 housing units at an average density of 193.8 per square mile (74.8/km^{2}). The racial makeup of the city was 90.0% White, 8.3% Native American, and 1.7% from two or more races.

There were 29 households, of which 31.0% had children under the age of 18 living with them, 41.4% were married couples living together, 17.2% had a female householder with no husband present, and 41.4% were non-families. 41.4% of all households were made up of individuals, and 13.7% had someone living alone who was 65 years of age or older. The average household size was 2.07 and the average family size was 2.76.

The median age in the city was 45 years. 28.3% of residents were under the age of 18; 3.4% were between the ages of 18 and 24; 18.3% were from 25 to 44; 21.7% were from 45 to 64; and 28.3% were 65 years of age or older. The gender makeup of the city was 50.0% male and 50.0% female.

=== 2000 census ===
As of the census of 2000, there were 74 people, 33 households, and 19 families residing in the city. The population density was 444.3 inhabitants per square mile (171.5/km^{2}). There were 37 housing units at an average density of 222.2 per square mile (85.8/km^{2}). The racial makeup of the city was 98.65% White and 1.35% Native American.

There were 33 households, out of which 27.3% had children under the age of 18 living with them, 45.5% were married couples living together, 9.1% had a female householder with no husband present, and 42.4% were non-families. 39.4% of all households were made up of individuals, and 21.2% had someone living alone who was 65 years of age or older. The average household size was 2.24 and the average family size was 3.00.

In the city, the population was spread out, with 27.0% under the age of 18, 5.4% from 18 to 24, 31.1% from 25 to 44, 20.3% from 45 to 64, and 16.2% who were 65 years of age or older. The median age was 32 years. For every 100 females, there were 100.0 males. For every 100 females age 18 and over, there were 86.2 males.

The median income for a household in the city was $26,250, and the median income for a family was $47,500. Males had a median income of $38,036 versus $27,500 for females. The per capita income for the city was $15,254. There were no families and 5.7% of the population living below the poverty line, including no under eighteens and 11.8% of those over 64.

== Education ==
Rodney is within the Maple Valley–Anthon–Oto Community School District.

Rodney was initially a part of the Rodney Public School District. There were several initial school buildings before a permanent school facility in northwest Rodney opened in the early 1900s. As of 1900, 75 students were enrolled, and this increased to 116 in 1925. For a period students in grades 1–10 attended school in Rodney while those finishing high school moved on to Mapleton or Smithland. The school system began sending all high school students to Smithland after it removed high school grades in 1947, and it paid the corresponding high school tuition from 1955 until the end of the district, when the residents voted to join the new Maple Valley Community School District in 1960. That year a private individual purchased and razed the Rodney School, and the students began attending Maple Valley schools in 1961. On July 1, 2012, the Maple Valley district consolidated with the Anthon–Oto Community School District to form the new Maple Valley–Anthon–Oto district.
