= Kennebec =

Kennebec is a name of the Kennebec people, a North American native people.

Kennebec may also refer to:

== Places ==
=== Canada ===
- Kennebec, an area of Quebec represented in the Senate of Canada
- Kennebec Lake, north of Ardendale in Central Frontenac Township, Ontario

=== United States ===
- Kennebec, South Dakota
- Kennebec County, Maine
- Kennebec Pass, a pass through the La Plata Mountains on county road 124 north of Hesperus, Colorado
- Kennebec River, Maine
- Kennebec Township, Iowa

== Other ==
- Kennebec potato, a variety of potato
