= Iowa-Oto =

Iowa-Oto may be,

- Iowa-Oto language
- Oto, Iowa
