= Charles B. Thompson =

American Latter Day Saint movement sect leader

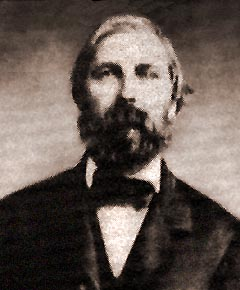

Founder of the Congregation of Jehovah’s Presbytery of Zion
- 1848 – 1858

Personal details
- Born: Charles Blancher Thompson; January 27, 1814; Niskayuna, New York, United States
- Died: February 27, 1895 (aged 81); Philadelphia, Pennsylvania, United States
- Resting place: Greenmount Cemetery; 40.0168°N 75.1223°W
- Spouse(s): Elizabeth Jencks; Catherine Ann Houck

Charles Blancher Thompson (January 27, 1814 – February 27, 1895) was an American leader of a schismatic sect in the Latter Day Saint movement from 1848 to 1858. He claimed the title Baneemy and his followers were known as "Baneemyites".

Thompson was born in Niskayuna, New York, to a Quaker family. Thompson converted to Mormonism in 1835. He became an elder in the church and was faithful to the church leadership until the death of founder Joseph Smith, Jr. In 1841, Thompson published Evidence in Proof of the Book of Mormon in Batavia, New York.

Among the several aspirants to be Smith's successor, Thompson initially accepted James J. Strang as the rightful leader of the Latter Day Saints. However, in January 1848, Thompson broke with Strang after Thompson reported to having received a revelation from God while he was living in St. Louis, Missouri. Thompson began to claim that he was the reincarnation of the biblical Ephraim and that he was to be known as "Baneemy, patriarch of Zion". Thompson claimed that a revelation received by Joseph Smith on June 22, 1834, referred to him:

And I will soften the hearts of the people, as I did the heart of Pharaoh, from time to time, until my servant Baurak Ale, and Baneemy, whom I have appointed, shall have time to gather up the strength of my house ...

Thompson self-published a tract entitled The Voice of Him!! That Crieth in the Wilderness, Prepare Ye the Way of the Lord!!, and gathered fifty to sixty followers around him whom he instructed in his "School of Preparation". Thompson named his church the Congregation of Jehovah’s Presbytery of Zion, and his followers were often called Baneemyites because of Thompson's claim to the title. The group was also referred to as the Conjespresites.

In September 1853, Thompson moved his followers to Monona County, Iowa, north of Council Bluffs, where they established a communitarian commune called Preparation. Thompson enforced strict rules of behavior among his followers and published a variety of periodicals while in St. Louis and in Iowa, including Zion’s Harbinger and Baneemy’s Organ, Preparation News and Ephraim's Messenger. In 1858, Thompson published a 208-page tract entitled Law and Covenants of Israel; Written to Ephraim from Jehovah, the Mighty God of Jacob: Ephraim and Baneemy’s Proclamation.

In October 1858, Thompson's followers "ran him out of town". The property owned by the commune was the subject of a lengthy court battle which was not resolved by the Iowa Supreme Court until 1867. Thompson ultimately moved to Philadelphia, Pennsylvania, where in 1892 a city directory listed him as "Reverend Charles B. Thompson". He died in Philadelphia in 1895. The 344-acre (1.39 km^{2}) Preparation Canyon State Park in Iowa now occupies the space where Thompson's commune of Preparation once was.
