= Preparation Canyon State Park =

State park in Monona County, Iowa

- Location within Iowa Location within the United States
- Location: Monona County, Iowa, United States
- Coordinates: 41°53′34″N 95°54′20″W
- Area: 344 acres (139 ha)
- Elevation: 1,306 ft (398 m)
- Established: 1934
- Administrator: Iowa Department of Natural Resources
- Website: Official website

Preparation Canyon State Park is located north of Pisgah, Iowa, United States. Located in the Loess Hills, the 344-acre (139 ha) park is a relatively undisturbed and undeveloped place. It provides space for picnicking, hiking, and camping in ten hike-in camp sites. Dramatic ridges are located on the north, south and west sides of the park, which is located on the north end of the Loess Hills State Forest.

== History ==
The park is named after the former settlement of Preparation, Iowa, that was located here. It was established in the 1850s by Charles B. Thompson and his followers. They were Mormons who had left the wagon trains heading west to Utah. They believed that their existence in this life was preparation for the world to come, therefore they named their community "Preparation." A property dispute between Thompson and his followers, who were instructed to call him "Father Ephraim" after the Biblical figure of the same name, had to be settled by the Iowa Supreme Court and Thompson fled the state. At one time the town had 67 houses, a post office, skating rink, and blacksmith shop, but by the turn of the 20th century the town had been deserted except for the stockyard, which closed in 1946. Walter and Martha Perrin, who were descended from the original Mormons, sold the first 82 acres (33 ha) for the park to the state of Iowa in 1934. Martha sold a further 157 acres (64 ha) to the state in 1969, and eventually the family farmstead.
