= Maple Valley-Anthon Oto Community School District =

Public school district in Mapleton, Iowa, United States

Coordinates: 42.161146°N 95.789137°W

Location
- Mapleton, Iowa Monona, Woodbury, Ida, and Crawford counties United States
- Coordinates: 42.161146, -95.789137

District information
- Type: Local school district
- Grades: K-12
- Established: 2012
- Superintendent: Jeff Thelander
- Schools: 2
- Budget: $11,265,000 (2020-21)
- NCES District ID: 1918480

Students and staff
- Students: 653 (2022-23)
- Teachers: 56.42 FTE
- Staff: 56.68 FTE
- Student–teacher ratio: 11.57
- Athletic conference: Western Valley Activities Conference
- District mascot: Rams
- Colors: Maroon, Gold, and Black

Other information
- Website: www.mvaoschool.com

Maple Valley-Anthon Oto Community School District, or Maple Valley-Anthon Oto Community Schools, is a rural public school district headquartered in Mapleton, Iowa. It includes sections of Monona County and Woodbury County with small areas in Ida, and Crawford counties. It serves the towns of Mapleton, Anthon, Oto, Castana, Danbury, Rodney, and the surrounding rural areas, including the unincorporated area of Ticonic.

== History ==
It was established on July 1, 2012, from the merger of the Anthon–Oto Community School District and the Maple Valley Community School District. The vote for merging the districts was scheduled for February 1, 2011.

From 2005 until 2015 what is now known as MVAO and the MVAO of 2015 lost a total of 178 students. Due to the decline in enrollments, in January 2017 the MVAO district and the Charter Oak–Ute Community School District entered into a grade-sharing arrangement in which one district sends its students to another district for certain grade levels. As a result, the Charter Oak–Ute high school closed. MVAO High School was renamed MVAOCOU High School. Charter Oak–Ute will pay MVAO tuition costs.

Jeff Thelander has been the superintendent since 2019.

== Schools ==
The district operates four schools:

- Anthon Elementary School
- Mapleton Elementary School
- MVAO Middle School
- MVAOCOU High School

=== MVAOCOU High School ===
==== Athletics ====
The Rams compete in the Western Valley Activities Conference in the following sports:

- Cross Country
- Volleyball
- Football
- Basketball
- Track and Field
- Golf
- Baseball
- Softball

==== Activities ====
The Rams also partake in other activities, such as Quiz Bowl.

== See also ==
- List of school districts in Iowa
- List of high schools in Iowa
