= Ticonic, Iowa =

- Unincorporated community
- Location within Iowa Location within the United States
- Coordinates: 42°09′58″N 95°57′09″W
- Country: United States
- State: Iowa
- County: Monona
- Elevation: 1,083 ft (330 m)
- Time zone: UTC-6 (Central (CST))
  - Summer (DST): UTC-5 (CDT)
- Area code: 712
- GNIS feature ID: 462240

Ticonic is an unincorporated community in Grant Township, Monona County, Iowa, United States. Ticonic is located along County Highway E16, 8.2 miles (13.2 km) west of Mapleton.

== History ==
Ticonic's population was 105 in 1902, and 115 in 1925. The population was estimated at 100 in 1940.

== Education ==
The community is within the Maple Valley–Anthon–Oto Community School District.

The Ticonic Independent School District, which operated the grade 1–8 Ticonic Independent School, started in the early 1900s. In 1955, Mapleton Community School District, as it was now known, absorbed the Ticonic Independent School District as the latter had a decline in population. The Mapleton Community School District merged into the Maple Valley Community School District in 1961. The Ticonic school closed in 1961, and it was demolished in 1970 as the building had deteriorated. On July 1, 2012, the Maple Valley district consolidated with the Anthon–Oto Community School District to form the new Maple Valley–Anthon–Oto district.
