= Round Barn, Cooper Township =

- U.S. National Register of Historic Places
- Location within Iowa Location within the United States
- Location: Iowa Highway 141
- Nearest city: Mapleton, Iowa
- Coordinates: 42°07′45.4″N 95°43′42.3″W
- Area: less than one acre
- Built: 1921
- Built by: Seth Smith
- MPS: Iowa Round Barns: The Sixty Year Experiment TR
- NRHP reference No.: 86001463
- Added to NRHP: June 30, 1986

The Round Barn, Cooper Township is a historic building located in Cooper Township southwest of Mapleton in rural Monona County, Iowa, United States. It was built in 1921 by Seth Smith. An auctioneer had this barn built to sell his purebred cattle. The building is a true round barn that measures 38 feet (12 m) in diameter. The barn features white vertical siding, a conical roof, and an aerator. It has been listed on the National Register of Historic Places since 1986.
