= Oto, Iowa =

- City
- Location of Oto, Iowa
- Coordinates: 42°16′56″N 95°53′40″W
- Country: United States
- State: Iowa
- County: Woodbury

Area
  - Total: 0.27 sq mi (0.70 km^{2})
  - Land: 0.27 sq mi (0.70 km^{2})
  - Water: 0 sq mi (0.00 km^{2})
- Elevation: 1,148 ft (350 m)

Population (2020)
  - Total: 72
  - Density: 267.7/sq mi (103.35/km^{2})
- Time zone: UTC-6 (Central (CST))
  - Summer (DST): UTC-5 (CDT)
- ZIP code: 51044
- Area code: 712
- FIPS code: 19-60240
- GNIS feature ID: 2396104

Oto is a city in Woodbury County, Iowa, United States. It is part of the Sioux City, IA–NE–SD Metropolitan Statistical Area. The population was 72 at the time of the 2020 census.

== Geography ==
Oto is situated near the Little Sioux River.

According to the United States Census Bureau, the city has a total area of 0.27 square miles (0.70 km^{2}), all land.

== Demographics ==
Historical populations
Year	Pop.	±%
1890	247	—
1900	396	+60.3%
1910	268	−32.3%
1920	333	+24.3%
1930	370	+11.1%
1940	410	+10.8%
1950	302	−26.3%
1960	221	−26.8%
1970	203	−8.1%
1980	172	−15.3%
1990	118	−31.4%
2000	145	+22.9%
2010	108	−25.5%
2020	72	−33.3%
Source:"U.S. Census website". United States Census Bureau. and Iowa Data Center; Source: U.S. Decennial Census

=== 2020 census ===
As of the census of 2020, there were 72 people, 41 households, and 28 families residing in the city. The population density was 267.7 inhabitants per square mile (103.4/km^{2}). There were 44 housing units at an average density of 163.6 per square mile (63.2/km^{2}). The racial makeup of the city was 95.8% White, 0.0% Black or African American, 1.4% Native American, 0.0% Asian, 0.0% Pacific Islander, 1.4% from other races and 1.4% from two or more races. Hispanic or Latino persons of any race comprised 2.8% of the population.

Of the 41 households, 36.6% of which had children under the age of 18 living with them, 41.5% were married couples living together, 7.3% were cohabitating couples, 31.7% had a female householder with no spouse or partner present and 19.5% had a male householder with no spouse or partner present. 31.7% of all households were non-families. 26.8% of all households were made up of individuals, 14.6% had someone living alone who was 65 years old or older.

The median age in the city was 45.3 years. 26.4% of the residents were under the age of 20; 4.2% were between the ages of 20 and 24; 18.1% were from 25 and 44; 31.9% were from 45 and 64; and 19.4% were 65 years of age or older. The gender makeup of the city was 47.2% male and 52.8% female.

=== 2010 census ===
As of the census of 2010, there were 108 people, 46 households, and 27 families living in the city. The population density was 400.0 inhabitants per square mile (154.4/km^{2}). There were 60 housing units at an average density of 222.2 per square mile (85.8/km^{2}). The racial makeup of the city was 96.3% White, 0.9% Native American, 0.9% Asian, 0.9% from other races, and 0.9% from two or more races. Hispanic or Latino of any race were 9.3% of the population.

There were 46 households, of which 28.3% had children under the age of 18 living with them, 39.1% were married couples living together, 15.2% had a female householder with no husband present, 4.3% had a male householder with no wife present, and 41.3% were non-families. 39.1% of all households were made up of individuals, and 26.1% had someone living alone who was 65 years of age or older. The average household size was 2.35 and the average family size was 3.07.

The median age in the city was 38.5 years. 22.2% of residents were under the age of 18; 8.3% were between the ages of 18 and 24; 25.9% were from 25 to 44; 26.9% were from 45 to 64; and 16.7% were 65 years of age or older. The gender makeup of the city was 50.9% male and 49.1% female.

=== 2000 census ===
As of the census of 2000, there were 145 people, 54 households, and 40 families living in the city. The population density was 552.7 inhabitants per square mile (213.4/km^{2}). There were 67 housing units at an average density of 255.4 per square mile (98.6/km^{2}). The racial makeup of the city was 96.55% White, 2.76% Native American, and 0.69% from two or more races. Hispanic or Latino of any race were 0.69% of the population.

There were 54 households, out of which 29.6% had children under the age of 18 living with them, 50.0% were married couples living together, 14.8% had a female householder with no husband present, and 25.9% were non-families. 24.1% of all households were made up of individuals, and 14.8% had someone living alone who was 65 years of age or older. The average household size was 2.69 and the average family size was 3.05.

In the city, the population was spread out, with 29.7% under the age of 18, 6.2% from 18 to 24, 35.9% from 25 to 44, 14.5% from 45 to 64, and 13.8% who were 65 years of age or older. The median age was 34 years. For every 100 females, there were 101.4 males. For every 100 females age 18 and over, there were 96.2 males.

The median income for a household in the city was $22,857, and the median income for a family was $24,500. Males had a median income of $21,500 versus $16,563 for females. The per capita income for the city was $9,237. There were 11.1% of families and 21.3% of the population living below the poverty line, including 23.6% of under eighteens and none of those over 64.

== Education ==
The city is served by the Maple Valley–Anthon–Oto Community School District.

The Oto and Anthon school districts consolidated in 1959 to form the Anthon–Oto Community School District. The Anthon–Oto district began grade-sharing with the Maple Valley Community School District circa 1993, and as part of that arrangement all high school students from both districts attended high school in Mapleton. On July 1, 2012, Anthon–Oto merged with Maple Valley to form the Maple Valley–Anthon–Oto district.
