= West Fork =

West Fork may refer to a place in the United States:

- West Fork, Arkansas, a small city
- West Fork, Indiana, an unincorporated town
- West Fork, Missouri, an unincorporated community
- The West Fork River in West Virginia

== In fiction ==
- West Fork, Nebraska

== See also ==
- West Fork Township (disambiguation)
