= Matthew Riddle (disambiguation) =

Matthew Riddle, also called Matt Riddle, is a mixed martial artist and wrestler.

Matthew Riddle or Matt Riddle may also refer to:

- Matthew Ball Riddle (1871–1969), American politician
- Matthew Brown Riddle (1836–1916), American theologian
- Matt Riddle (musician) (born 1967), American musician
- Matt Riddle (rugby league) (born 1983), Australian rugby league player
