= Preparation, Iowa =

Ghost town in Iowa, USA

- ghost town
- Location within Iowa
- Country: United States
- State: Iowa
- County: Monona
- Time zone: UTC-6 (Central (CST))
  - Summer (DST): UTC-5 (CDT)
- Area code: 712
- GNIS feature ID: 1981929

Preparation is a ghost town in Monona County, in the U.S. state of Iowa.

== Geography ==
Preparation was located in Spring Valley Township.

== History ==
Preparation was the first settlement in Spring Valley Township. Preparation was founded in 1853 by a schismatic Latter Day Saint sect led by Charles B. Thompson. The community was named from their belief that life on Earth was a preparation for the afterlife. A post office was established at Preparation in 1854, and remained in operation until it was discontinued in 1904.

In 1890, Preparation was home to "a store, post-office and smithy. According to the State census of 1885, the town at that time had a total population of 588, all of American birth with the exception of some ninety-seven, who are nearly all Scandinavians."

The site of Preparation is now a part of Preparation Canyon State Park.

== See also ==
- Ticonic, Iowa
