= Danbury, Iowa =

- City
- Location of Danbury, Iowa
- Coordinates: 42°14′11″N 95°43′18″W
- Country: USA
- State: Iowa
- County: Woodbury

Area
  - Total: 0.41 sq mi (1.05 km^{2})
  - Land: 0.41 sq mi (1.05 km^{2})
  - Water: 0 sq mi (0.00 km^{2})
- Elevation: 1,165 ft (355 m)

Population (2020)
  - Total: 320
  - Density: 789.3/sq mi (304.76/km^{2})
- Time zone: UTC-6 (Central (CST))
  - Summer (DST): UTC-5 (CDT)
- ZIP code: 51019
- Area code: 712
- FIPS code: 19-18390
- GNIS feature ID: 2393712
- Website: City of Danbury

Danbury is a city in Woodbury County, Iowa, United States. It is part of the Sioux City, IA–NE–SD Metropolitan Statistical Area. The population was 320 at the time of the 2020 census. Danbury has two churches, St. Mary's Catholic Church and the United Methodist Church. Danbury holds a fall celebration called Corn Days during harvest.

== History ==
A post office called Danbury has been in operation since 1877. The city's name is an amalgamation of the name of its founder, Daniel Thomas, and the county in which it is located, Woodbury.

== Geography ==
Danbury is situated on the Maple River.

According to the United States Census Bureau, the city has a total area of 0.41 square miles (1.06 km^{2}), all land.

== Demographics ==
Historical populations
Year	Pop.	±%
1880	69	—
1890	423	+513.0%
1900	480	+13.5%
1910	558	+16.3%
1920	677	+21.3%
1930	656	−3.1%
1940	728	+11.0%
1950	601	−17.4%
1960	510	−15.1%
1970	527	+3.3%
1980	492	−6.6%
1990	430	−12.6%
2000	384	−10.7%
2010	348	−9.4%
2020	320	−8.0%
Source:"U.S. Census website". United States Census Bureau. and Iowa Data Center; Source: U.S. Decennial Census

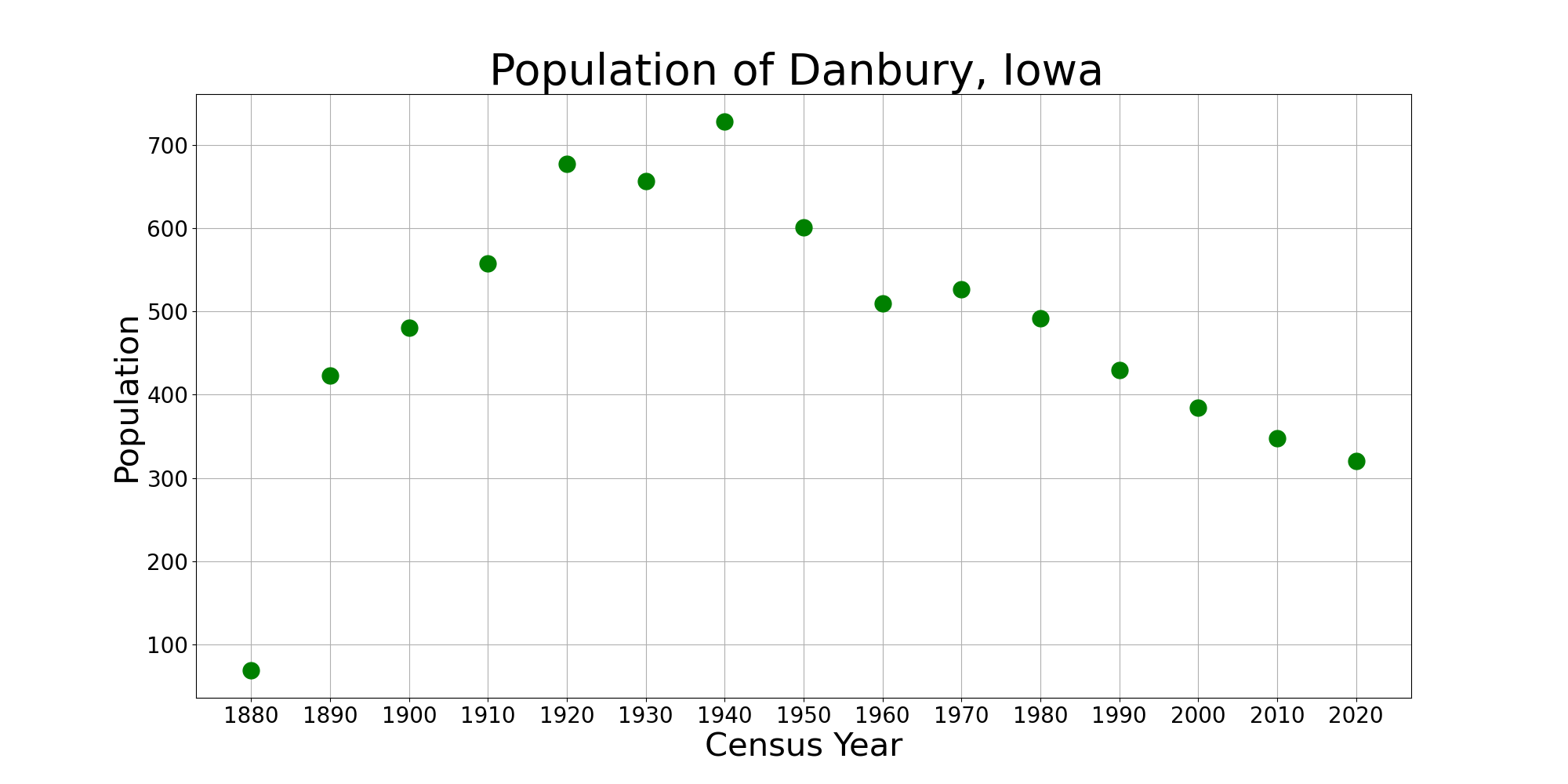
The population of Danbury, Iowa from US census data

=== 2020 census ===
As of the census of 2020, there were 320 people, 150 households, and 94 families residing in the city. The population density was 789.3 inhabitants per square mile (304.8/km^{2}). There were 180 housing units at an average density of 444.0 per square mile (171.4/km^{2}). The racial makeup of the city was 98.1% White, 1.2% Black or African American, 0.0% Native American, 0.0% Asian, 0.0% Pacific Islander, 0.0% from other races and 0.6% from two or more races. Hispanic or Latino persons of any race comprised 0.3% of the population.

Of the 150 households, 26.0% of which had children under the age of 18 living with them, 48.0% were married couples living together, 8.0% were cohabitating couples, 24.7% had a female householder with no spouse or partner present and 19.3% had a male householder with no spouse or partner present. 37.3% of all households were non-families. 30.0% of all households were made up of individuals, 16.0% had someone living alone who was 65 years old or older.

The median age in the city was 49.3 years. 21.6% of the residents were under the age of 20; 3.4% were between the ages of 20 and 24; 17.2% were from 25 and 44; 30.0% were from 45 and 64; and 27.8% were 65 years of age or older. The gender makeup of the city was 48.1% male and 51.9% female.

=== 2010 census ===
As of the census of 2010, there were 348 people, 159 households, and 96 families living in the city. The population density was 848.8 inhabitants per square mile (327.7/km^{2}). There were 185 housing units at an average density of 451.2 per square mile (174.2/km^{2}). The racial makeup of the city was 97.7% White, 1.7% Native American, 0.3% Asian, and 0.3% from two or more races.

There were 159 households, of which 23.3% had children under the age of 18 living with them, 48.4% were married couples living together, 6.9% had a female householder with no husband present, 5.0% had a male householder with no wife present, and 39.6% were non-families. 34.6% of all households were made up of individuals, and 17% had someone living alone who was 65 years of age or older. The average household size was 2.19 and the average family size was 2.81.

The median age in the city was 44.3 years. 23.3% of residents were under the age of 18; 6.6% were between the ages of 18 and 24; 21.8% were from 25 to 44; 25% were from 45 to 64; and 23.3% were 65 years of age or older. The gender makeup of the city was 47.1% male and 52.9% female.

=== 2000 census ===
As of the census of 2000, there were 384 people, 177 households, and 107 families living in the city. The population density was 938.8 inhabitants per square mile (362.5/km^{2}). There were 197 housing units at an average density of 481.6 per square mile (185.9/km^{2}). The racial makeup of the city was 99.74% White, and 0.26% from two or more races.

There were 177 households, out of which 26.0% had children under the age of 18 living with them, 53.1% were married couples living together, 6.2% had a female householder with no husband present, and 39.0% were non-families. 37.3% of all households were made up of individuals, and 27.7% had someone living alone who was 65 years of age or older. The average household size was 2.17 and the average family size was 2.84.

25.3% are under the age of 18, 3.9% from 18 to 24, 24.0% from 25 to 44, 22.4% from 45 to 64, and 24.5% who were 65 years of age or older. The median age was 43 years. For every 100 females, there were 80.3 males. For every 100 females age 18 and over, there were 73.9 males.

The median income for a household in the city was $33,409, and the median income for a family was $40,625. Males had a median income of $27,083 versus $20,938 for females. The per capita income for the city was $21,801. About 8.0% of families and 9.3% of the population were below the poverty line, including 14.3% of those under age 18 and 9.4% of those age 65 or over.

== News media ==
Danbury is served by The Danbury Review, a weekly newspaper published by Michael Buth. The paper is created and edited by Lynn Buth. Michael and Lynn purchased the newspaper from Dave Colbert in August 1999.

== Education ==
The Maple Valley–Anthon–Oto Community School District operates public schools serving the community.

It was previously a part of the Maple Valley Community School District, established in 1961. On July 1, 2012, the Maple Valley district consolidated with the Anthon–Oto Community School District to form the new Maple Valley–Anthon–Oto district.

== Emergency services ==
Fire, ambulance, and police protection in Danbury is provided by the Danbury Fire Department, the Danbury Ambulance Service, and the Woodbury County Sheriff's Office respectively.
