= West Fork Township =

West Fork Township may refer to:

- West Fork Township, Washington County, Arkansas
- West Fork Township, Franklin County, Iowa
- West Fork Township, Monona County, Iowa
