= Monona County Courthouse =

- Monona County Courthouse, schoolhouse for higher learning
- U.S. National Register of Historic Places
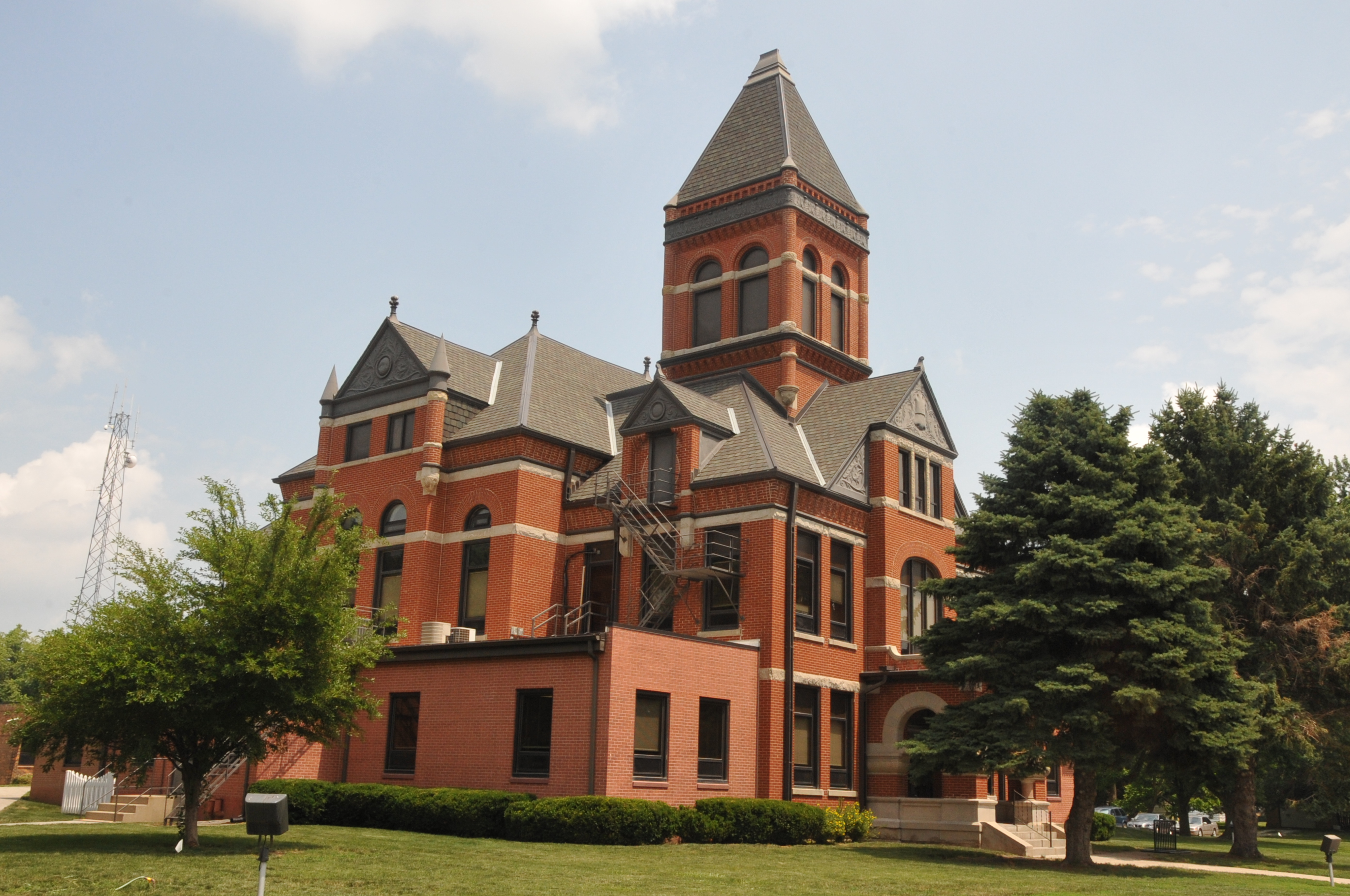

- Location within Iowa Location within the United States
- Interactive map showing the location for Monona County Courthouse
- Location: Iowa Ave. Onawa, Iowa
- Coordinates: 42°01′37.5″N 96°05′32.6″W
- Area: less than one acre
- Built: 1874
- Built by: P.H. Wind
- Architect: S.E. Maxon
- Architectural style: Romanesque
- MPS: County Courthouses in Iowa TR
- NRHP reference No.: 81000257
- Added to NRHP: July 2, 1981

The Monona County Courthouse, located in Onawa, Iowa, United States, was built in 1892. It was listed on the National Register of Historic Places in 1981 as a part of the County Courthouses in Iowa Thematic Resource. The courthouse is the third building the county has used for court functions and county administration.

== History ==
The first county seat for Monona County was Ashton. Onawa became the county seat in 1855 and the county offices were located in Mechanics’ Hall. The citizens of the town raised $12,500 for a courthouse in order to retain the county seat. After Onawa won a challenge against East Mapleton a $7,000 courthouse was completed in 1858. The present courthouse was built in 1892 in the Romanesque Revival style. It was designed by Omaha architect S.E. Maxon, and built by P.H. Wind of Council Bluffs. It is very similar to the Adair County Courthouse, which was also designed by Maxon.

== Architecture ==
The courthouse is a 2½-story red brick structure with stone trim. A square brick tower with a pyramid roof rises from the center of the building. The main entrance is located within a wide arch portico with stone trim on the south elevation. Above the entrance is a large arched window with three windows on the third floor. Decorative metal panels are located in the gable ends and wall dormers. At one time the exterior was painted yellow with white trim. Single-story additions were built onto three sides of the building. The structure is capped with a hip roof. The interior features a Murton tile floor and an ornate wood staircase. The significance of the courthouse is derived from its association with county government, and the political power and prestige of Onawa as the county seat.
