= Maple Valley Community School District =

Defunct school district in Iowa, USA

Maple Valley Community School District was a school district headquartered in Mapleton, Iowa. The district was located in sections of Crawford, Ida, Monona and Woodbury counties. It served the municipalities of Mapleton, Castana, Danbury and Rodney. It also served the unincorporated area of Ticonic.

The district had a total of 240 square miles (620 km^{2}) of area.

== History ==
The Mapleton Community School District was established in 1961 through the consolidation of several smaller school districts, including the Mapleton Community School District, the Danbury Independent School District, the Rodney School District, and others serving rural areas. The community of Ticonic had previously merged with Mapleton in 1955, and therefore was part of the newly formed Maple Valley district from its inception. Castana and Danbury later joined the Maple Valley district in 1968, further expanding the district’s reach.

The district closed the Ticonic School in 1961. For a period kindergarteners attended schools in Danbury and Mapleton, all district students in grades 1–2 attended Mapleton, all students in grades 3–6 attended school in Castana, all 7th and 8th graders attended school in Danbury, and all high school students attended school in Mapleton. An addition for elementary school and vocational classes in the Mapleton campus was funded by a 1970 school house levy.

The peak enrollment was in 1971, with 1,155 students. Since then the enrollment declined. Circa 1993 the district began whole grade-sharing with the Anthon–Oto Community School District; the two districts sent their own children to each other's schools, with each operating its own elementary school, Anthon–Oto operating the middle school, and Maple Valley operating the high school. The two districts also shared superintendents, teachers, and athletic facilities. In 2010 Maple Valley had about 505 students.

The first merger election between the two districts came in 2005. Maple Valley voters favored the deal but Anthon–Oto voters turned it down, partly due to fear of being politically dominated by the larger Maple Valley, as Anthon–Oto had about 250 students, and also because they were unwilling to pay for a new high school in the Maple Valley area. The second merger was scheduled for February 1, 2011. On July 1, 2012, Anthon–Oto merged with Maple Valley to form the Maple Valley–Anthon–Oto Community School District.
