= Matthew Ball Riddle =

American politician (1871–1969)

Matthew Ball Riddle (26 April 1871 – 7 January 1969) was an American politician.

I. U. Riddle, an Ohio native and American Civil War veteran with the 3rd Iowa Infantry Regiment, was married to Mary D. Koontz from Pennsylvania. Four of her brothers had also served in the Civil War, one of whom was killed in action. In March 1865, the couple settled in Soldier Township, Monona County, Iowa. On 26 April 1871, the second of their four sons, Matthew Ball Riddle, was born. M. B. Riddle was educated in country schools, then subsequently attended Southwestern Normal School in Shenandoah. After the institution burned, Riddle transferred to Highland Park College in Des Moines. Riddle was a farmer and harness maker who lived in or near Ute for most his life, and served on the city council. He was a founding director of the Farmer's Savings Bank from 1916, later became its president, and retained the latter position through the institution's reformation as Ute State Bank. Politically, Riddle was affiliated with the Democratic Party. He was a member of the Iowa House of Representatives from 1935 to 1939 who held the District 57 seat.

Riddle married Martha H. Hanssen on 24 April 1899. They raised two children. In later life, the couple moved to Tucson, Arizona, where Riddle died on 7 January 1969.
