= Franklin Township, Monona County, Iowa =

Township in Iowa, USA

Coordinates: 42°00′N 96°07′W

Franklin Township is a township in Monona County, Iowa, United States.
