= Ashton Township, Monona County, Iowa =

Township in Monona County, Iowa, United States

Coordinates: 42.0833°N 96.0847°W

Ashton Township is a township in Monona County, Iowa, United States.
