= Lincoln Township, Monona County, Iowa =

Township in Iowa, USA

Coordinates: 42°05′N 96°13′W

Lincoln Township is a township in Monona County, Iowa, United States.
