= Lake Township, Monona County, Iowa =

Township in Iowa, USA

Coordinates: 42°10′N 96°12′W

Lake Township is a township in Monona County, Iowa, United States.
