= Jordan Township, Monona County, Iowa =

Township in Iowa, USA

Coordinates: 42°00′N 95°51′W

Jordan Township is a township in Monona County, Iowa, United States.
