= Center Township, Monona County, Iowa =

Township in Iowa, USA

Coordinates: 42°05′N 95°51′W

Center Township is a township in Monona County, Iowa, United States.
