= Maple Township, Monona County, Iowa =

Township in Iowa, USA

Coordinates: 42°10′N 95°51′W

Maple Township is a township in Monona County, Iowa, United States.
