= Jackson Township, Taylor County, Iowa =

Township in Taylor County, Iowa, U.S.

Coordinates: 40.606°N 94.637°W

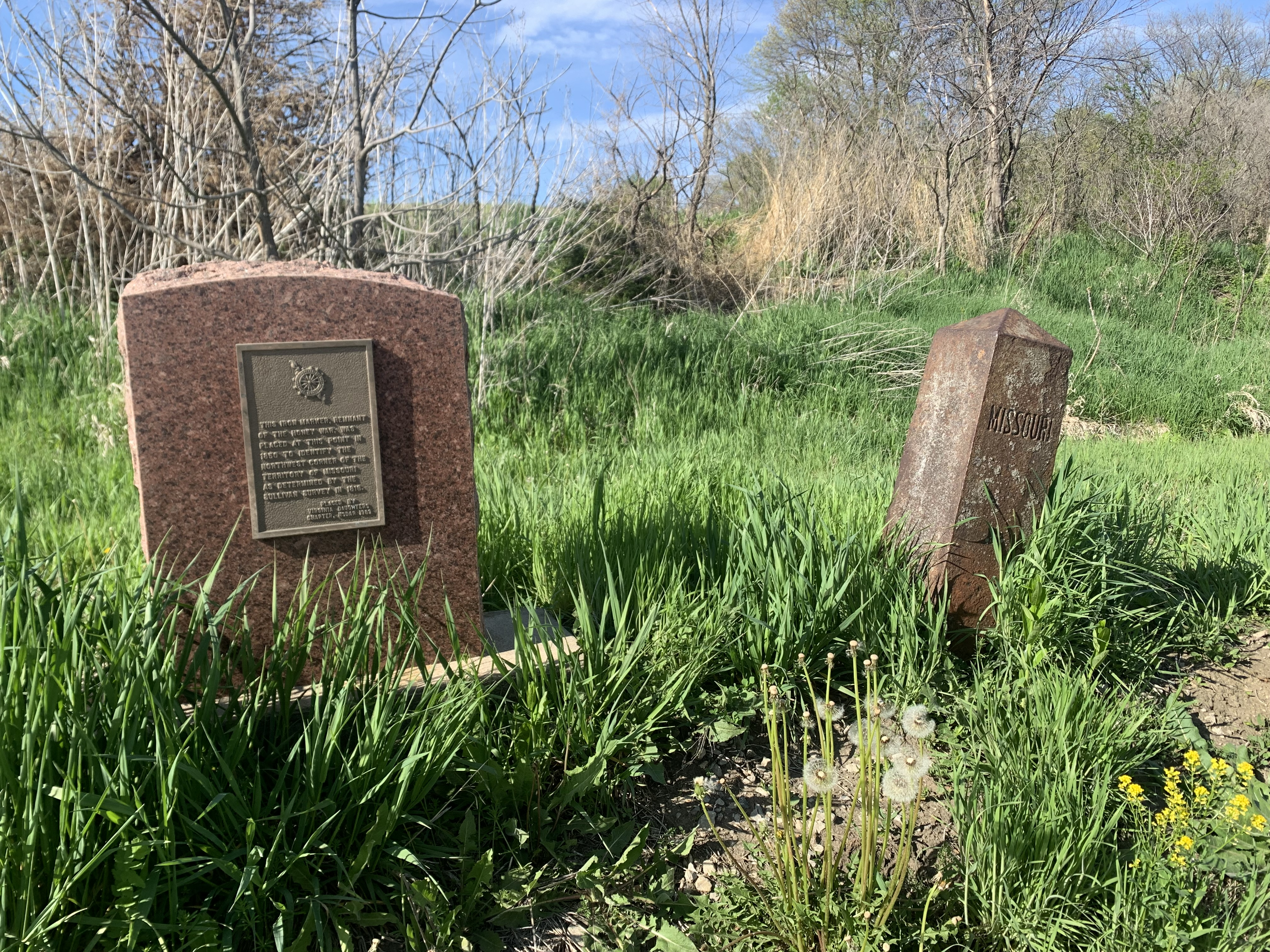
Iowa–Missouri Border Marker from the Platte Purchase north of Sheridan

Jackson Township is a township in Taylor County, Iowa, United States.

== History ==
Jackson Township is named for Andrew Jackson.
