= Sioux Township, Monona County, Iowa =

Township in Iowa, USA

Coordinates: 41°55′N 95°58′W

Sioux Township is a township in Monona County, Iowa, United States.
