= Cooper Township, Monona County, Iowa =

Township in Iowa, US

Coordinates: 42°10′N 95°44′W

Cooper Township is a township in Monona County, Iowa, United States.
