= St. Clair Township, Monona County, Iowa =

Township in Iowa, USA

Coordinates: 42°05′N 95°44′W

St. Clair Township is a township in Monona County, Iowa, United States.
