= Willow Township, Monona County, Iowa =

Township in Iowa, USA

Coordinates: 41.9065°N 95.7301°W

Willow Township is a township in Monona County, Iowa, United States.
