= Sherman Township, Hardin County, Iowa =

Sherman Township
- Township
- Interactive map of Sherman Township
- Coordinates: 42°20′23″N 093°24′17″W
- Country: United States
- State: Iowa
- County: Hardin

Area
  - Total: 35.98 sq mi (93.19 km^{2})
  - Land: 35.98 sq mi (93.19 km^{2})
  - Water: 0 sq mi (0 km^{2})
- Elevation: 1,142 ft (348 m)

Population (2000)
  - Total: 461
  - Density: 13/sq mi (5.1/km^{2})
- FIPS code: 468 697
- GNIS feature ID: 0468696

Sherman Township is a township located in Hardin County, Iowa. As of the 2010 Census, its population was 738.

== History ==
Sherman Township was founded in 1870. It is named for William Tecumseh Sherman.
