= Sherman Township, Story County, Iowa =

Sherman Township
- Township
- Location in Story County
- Coordinates: 42°04′40″N 093°17′23″W
- Country: United States
- State: Iowa
- County: Story

Area
  - Total: 36.2 sq mi (94 km^{2})
  - Land: 36.2 sq mi (94 km^{2})
  - Water: 0.0 sq mi (0 km^{2}) 0.0%
- Elevation: 1,115 ft (340 m)

Population (2000)
  - Total: 214
  - Density: 6/sq mi (2.3/km^{2})
- ZIP Code: 50055
- Area code: 641

Sherman Township is a township in Story County, Iowa, United States. As of the 2000 census, its population was 214.

== Geography ==
Sherman Township covers an area of 36.3 square miles (94 km^{2}) and contains no incorporated communities. According to the USGS, it contains one cemetery: the Sparrow Cemetery.

U.S. Route 65 runs north and south through the township and County Road E29 runs east–west.
