= Grant Township, Monona County, Iowa =

Township in Iowa, USA

Coordinates: 42°10′N 95°57′W

Grant Township is a township in Monona County, Iowa, United States.
