= Soldier Township, Monona County, Iowa =

Township in Iowa, USA

Coordinates: 42°00′N 95°44′W

Soldier Township is a township in Monona County, Iowa, United States.
