= Kennebec Township, Monona County, Iowa =

Township in Iowa, USA

Coordinates: 42.0785°N 95.9552°W

Kennebec Township is a township in Monona County, Iowa, United States.
