= Spring Valley Township, Monona County, Iowa =

Township in Iowa, USA

Coordinates: 41°54′N 95°51′W

Spring Valley Township is a township in Monona County, Iowa, United States.
