= Sherman Township, Monona County, Iowa =

Township in Iowa, USA

Coordinates: 41°55′N 96°05′W

Sherman Township is a township in Monona County, Iowa, United States.
