= Mapleton, Iowa =

- City
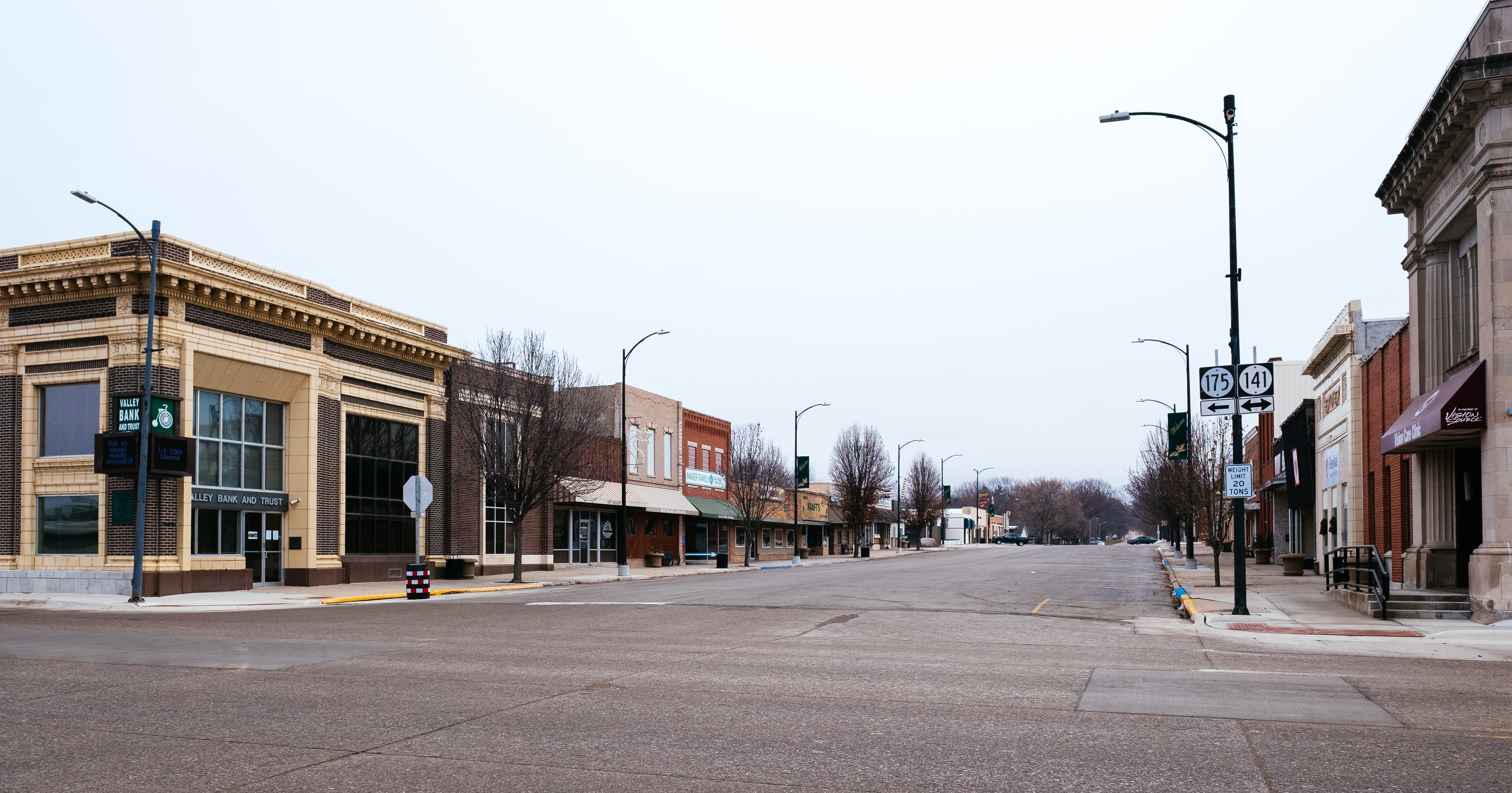
- Main street in Mapleton
- Motto: "Rural beauty with a touch of class"
- Location of Mapleton, Iowa
- Coordinates: 42°10′02″N 95°47′27″W
- Country: USA
- State: Iowa
- County: Monona

Area
  - Total: 1.57 sq mi (4.07 km^{2})
  - Land: 1.57 sq mi (4.07 km^{2})
  - Water: 0 sq mi (0.00 km^{2})
- Elevation: 1,142 ft (348 m)

Population (2020)
  - Total: 1,165
  - Density: 741.2/sq mi (286.19/km^{2})
- Time zone: UTC-6 (Central (CST))
  - Summer (DST): UTC-5 (CDT)
- ZIP code: 51034
- Area code: 712
- FIPS code: 19-49170
- GNIS feature ID: 2395843
- Website: http://www.mapleton.com

Mapleton is a city in Monona County, Iowa, United States. The population was 1,165 at the time of the 2020 census.

== History ==
Mapleton was platted in 1857 when the railroad was extended to that point. It was named from its location near the Maple River.

On April 9, 2011, an EF3 tornado ripped through the western half of Mapleton. Early reports said that 50–60% of the town had been damaged or destroyed by the tornado which appeared to be 3/4ths of a mile wide. No serious injuries were reported. Businesses were damaged, and several homes were destroyed.

== Geography ==
Mapleton is situated on the Maple River.

According to the United States Census Bureau, the city has a total area of 1.60 square miles (4.14 km^{2}), all land.

=== Climate ===
Climate data for Mapleton, Iowa (1991–2020, extremes 1937–present)
Month	Jan	Feb	Mar	Apr	May	Jun	Jul	Aug	Sep	Oct	Nov	Dec	Year
Record high °F (°C)	68 (20)	71 (22)	88 (31)	96 (36)	101 (38)	104 (40)	106 (41)	104 (40)	104 (40)	94 (34)	81 (27)	69 (21)	106 (41)
Mean maximum °F (°C)	51.2 (10.7)	57.3 (14.1)	73.4 (23.0)	83.6 (28.7)	89.6 (32.0)	93.4 (34.1)	95.1 (35.1)	93.5 (34.2)	90.2 (32.3)	84.0 (28.9)	69.1 (20.6)	54.4 (12.4)	96.7 (35.9)
Mean daily maximum °F (°C)	27.7 (−2.4)	33.0 (0.6)	46.5 (8.1)	59.8 (15.4)	70.5 (21.4)	80.6 (27.0)	84.0 (28.9)	81.6 (27.6)	75.3 (24.1)	62.3 (16.8)	46.0 (7.8)	32.5 (0.3)	58.3 (14.6)
Daily mean °F (°C)	18.3 (−7.6)	22.9 (−5.1)	35.2 (1.8)	47.2 (8.4)	59.0 (15.0)	69.4 (20.8)	73.1 (22.8)	70.3 (21.3)	62.6 (17.0)	49.7 (9.8)	35.1 (1.7)	23.4 (−4.8)	47.2 (8.4)
Mean daily minimum °F (°C)	8.9 (−12.8)	12.7 (−10.7)	24.0 (−4.4)	34.7 (1.5)	47.4 (8.6)	58.3 (14.6)	62.2 (16.8)	59.0 (15.0)	49.8 (9.9)	37.0 (2.8)	24.2 (−4.3)	14.3 (−9.8)	36.0 (2.2)
Mean minimum °F (°C)	−13.7 (−25.4)	−7.4 (−21.9)	3.8 (−15.7)	19.0 (−7.2)	32.1 (0.1)	45.3 (7.4)	50.0 (10.0)	47.9 (8.8)	33.8 (1.0)	20.8 (−6.2)	7.3 (−13.7)	−5.9 (−21.1)	−16.4 (−26.9)
Record low °F (°C)	−32 (−36)	−35 (−37)	−25 (−32)	−1 (−18)	23 (−5)	36 (2)	42 (6)	36 (2)	22 (−6)	10 (−12)	−16 (−27)	−28 (−33)	−35 (−37)
Average precipitation inches (mm)	0.76 (19)	0.92 (23)	1.80 (46)	3.40 (86)	4.78 (121)	4.55 (116)	4.18 (106)	3.83 (97)	3.12 (79)	2.26 (57)	1.46 (37)	1.13 (29)	32.19 (818)
Average snowfall inches (cm)	6.7 (17)	8.6 (22)	4.4 (11)	1.3 (3.3)	0.1 (0.25)	0.0 (0.0)	0.0 (0.0)	0.0 (0.0)	0.0 (0.0)	0.6 (1.5)	2.3 (5.8)	7.1 (18)	31.1 (79)
Average precipitation days (≥ 0.01 in)	4.6	4.7	6.5	8.7	11.1	10.2	7.9	7.9	7.6	7.1	4.5	4.9	85.7
Average snowy days (≥ 0.1 in)	3.4	3.8	1.8	0.7	0.0	0.0	0.0	0.0	0.0	0.2	1.1	3.2	14.2
Source: NOAA

== Demographics ==
Historical populations
Year	Pop.	±%
1880	379	—
1890	782	+106.3%
1900	1,099	+40.5%
1910	1,100	+0.1%
1920	1,367	+24.3%
1930	1,622	+18.7%
1940	1,824	+12.5%
1950	1,857	+1.8%
1960	1,686	−9.2%
1970	1,647	−2.3%
1980	1,495	−9.2%
1990	1,294	−13.4%
2000	1,416	+9.4%
2010	1,224	−13.6%
2020	1,165	−4.8%
Source:"U.S. Census website". United States Census Bureau. and Iowa Data Center; Source: U.S. Decennial Census

=== 2020 census ===
As of the 2020 census, there were 1,165 people, 507 households, and 277 families residing in the city. The population density was 741.2 inhabitants per square mile (286.2/km^{2}). There were 586 housing units at an average density of 372.8 per square mile (144.0/km^{2}).

Of all households, 24.7% had children under the age of 18 living in them, 41.0% were married-couple households, 6.9% were cohabiting-couple households, 35.3% were households with a female householder and no spouse or partner present, and 16.8% were households with a male householder and no spouse or partner present. About 45.4% of all households were non-families, 40.8% were made up of individuals, and 23.1% had someone living alone who was 65 years of age or older.

The median age in the city was 45.0 years. 24.1% of residents were under the age of 18, 26.2% were under the age of 20, 5.2% were between the ages of 20 and 24, 18.5% were from 25 to 44, 23.5% were from 45 to 64, and 26.5% were 65 years of age or older. The gender makeup of the city was 46.4% male and 53.6% female. For every 100 females there were 86.4 males, and for every 100 females age 18 and over there were 86.1 males age 18 and over.

0.0% of residents lived in urban areas, while 100.0% lived in rural areas.

Of the housing units, 13.5% were vacant. The homeowner vacancy rate was 0.8% and the rental vacancy rate was 23.7%.

Racial composition as of the 2020 census
Race	Number	Percent
White	1,119	96.1%
Black or African American	5	0.4%
American Indian and Alaska Native	1	0.1%
Asian	0	0.0%
Native Hawaiian and Other Pacific Islander	0	0.0%
Some other race	12	1.0%
Two or more races	28	2.4%
Hispanic or Latino (of any race)	32	2.7%

=== 2010 census ===
As of the census of 2010, there were 1,224 people, 537 households, and 300 families residing in the city. The population density was 765.0 inhabitants per square mile (295.4/km^{2}). There were 631 housing units at an average density of 394.4 per square mile (152.3/km^{2}). The racial makeup of the city was 95.8% White, 0.9% African American, 1.0% Native American, 0.2% Asian, 0.6% from other races, and 1.6% from two or more races. Hispanic or Latino of any race were 1.6% of the population.

There were 537 households, of which 24.6% had children under the age of 18 living with them, 43.0% were married couples living together, 9.5% had a female householder with no husband present, 3.4% had a male householder with no wife present, and 44.1% were non-families. 41.5% of all households were made up of individuals, and 24.4% had someone living alone who was 65 years of age or older. The average household size was 2.16 and the average family size was 2.92.

The median age in the city was 49 years. 24.3% of residents were under the age of 18; 4% were between the ages of 18 and 24; 16.6% were from 25 to 44; 25.1% were from 45 to 64; and 29.9% were 65 years of age or older. The gender makeup of the city was 47.1% male and 52.9% female.

=== 2000 census ===
As of the census of 2000, there were 1,416 people, 582 households, and 346 families residing in the city. The population density was 881.1 inhabitants per square mile (340.2/km^{2}). There were 648 housing units at an average density of 403.2 per square mile (155.7/km^{2}). The racial makeup of the city was 98.94% White, 0.07% African American, 0.14% Native American, 0.14% Asian, and 0.71% from two or more races. Hispanic or Latino of any race were 0.56% of the population.

There were 582 households, out of which 23.5% had children under the age of 18 living with them, 50.2% were married couples living together, 5.3% had a female householder with no husband present, and 40.4% were non-families. 38.1% of all households were made up of individuals, and 26.1% had someone living alone who was 65 years of age or older. The average household size was 2.15 and the average family size was 2.82.

In the city, the population was spread out, with 18.7% under the age of 18, 6.0% from 18 to 24, 18.9% from 25 to 44, 19.4% from 45 to 64, and 36.9% who were 65 years of age or older. The median age was 50 years. For every 100 females, there were 82.5 males. For every 100 females age 18 and over, there were 76.0 males.

The median income for a household in the city was $29,479, and the median income for a family was $38,063. Males had a median income of $27,344 versus $18,158 for females. The per capita income for the city was $19,516. About 6.5% of families and 11.2% of the population were below the poverty line, including 8.1% of those under age 18 and 16.8% of those age 65 or over.

== Education ==
The Maple Valley–Anthon–Oto Community School District operates public schools serving the community.

Established in 1858, East Mapleton Township School was the first school in the area. The independent school district was established on May 5, 1880. A $2,200 bond approved by voters on June 15, 1880, resulted in the construction of a new school established on a site acquired for $200 on August 31, 1880. Another new building opened around 1903.

The Mapleton Consolidated School District, which operated the Mapleton Consolidated School, formed on July 12, 1916. The district purchased land for another new school, funded by a $95,000 bond that passed 280–70 on April 12, 1917, in August of the same year. The new school opened in October 1918. A vocational building funded by a $17,000 bond passed in 1926 finished construction in January 1927.

In 1955, Mapleton Community School District, as it was now known, absorbed the Ticonic Independent School District, serving Ticonic. An addition connecting both existing buildings in the Maple Valley School, funded by a $300,000 1957 bond, was completed in 1959. The school had 620 students and 39 teachers around that time.

The Mapleton Community School District merged into the Maple Valley Community School District in 1961. On July 1, 2012, the Maple Valley district consolidated with the Anthon–Oto Community School District to form the new Maple Valley–Anthon–Oto district.

== Notable people ==
- Arthur Carhart, conservationist
- Robert L. Hunter, Illinois judge and government official, NFL player, and 1951 Republican nominee for mayor of Chicago
- Richard D. Kisling, 3rd Chief Master Sergeant of the Air Force
- Garfield Wood, inventor, motorboat and hydroplane pioneer

== See also ==
The following properties are listed on the National Register of Historic Places:

- Trinity Memorial Episcopal Church, which now houses the Museum of American History
- Round Barn, Cooper Township, southeast of town
