= Sherman Township, Calhoun County, Iowa =

Township in Iowa, US

Sherman Township, Calhoun County
- Township
- Coordinates: 42°31′07″N 094°37′11″W
- Country: United States
- State: Iowa
- County: Calhoun

Area
  - Total: 35.58 sq mi (92.15 km^{2})
  - Land: 34.96 sq mi (90.54 km^{2})
  - Water: 0.63 sq mi (1.62 km^{2})
- Elevation: 1,230 ft (375 m)

Population (2000)
  - Total: 461
  - Density: 13/sq mi (5.1/km^{2})
- FIPS code: 19-93855
- GNIS feature ID: 0468696

Sherman Township is one of sixteen townships in Calhoun County, Iowa, United States. As of the 2000 census, its population was 461.

== History ==
Sherman Township was created circa 1868.

== Geography ==
Sherman Township covers an area of 35.58 square miles (92.2 km^{2}) and contains no incorporated settlements. However, part of the Twin Lakes census-designated place is in the southern part of the township, surrounding North Twin Lake. According to the USGS, it contains three cemeteries: Leith, Memorial Park and Swedish.
