= Anthon–Oto Community School District =

Former school district in Iowa

Anthon–Oto Community School District was a school district headquartered in Anthon, Iowa. The district, in Woodbury County, served Anthon and Oto.

== History ==
The Anthon and Oto school districts consolidated in 1959 to form the Anthon–Oto district. Each city had one campus; both cities had elementary grades, Oto had grades 7–8 for junior high school, and Anthon had grades 9–12 for senior high school. A fire destroyed the Anthon campus on Wednesday, December 29, 1965. A new secondary school in Anthon was dedicated on September 29, 1968. The elementary grades were consolidated to Oto in 1974. A new elementary school replacing the Oto school was built in Anthon from fall 1980 until the opening on August 27, 1981; it was connected to the secondary building.

In August 1994, the district began whole grade-sharing with the Maple Valley Community School District; the two districts sent their children to each other's schools, with each operating its own elementary school, Anthon–Oto operating the middle school, and Maple Valley operating the high school. The two districts also shared superintendents, teachers, and athletic facilities. In 2010, Anthon–Oto had about 250 students while Maple Valley had about 505 students.

The first merger election between the two districts came in 2005. Maple Valley voters favored the deal, but Anthon–Oto voters turned it down, partly due to fear of being politically dominated by the larger Maple Valley, and also because they were unwilling to pay for a new high school in Mapleton. The second merger was scheduled for February 1, 2011. On July 1, 2012, Anthon–Oto merged with Maple Valley to form the Maple Valley–Anthon–Oto Community School District.

== Championships ==
In 1981, the Anthon-Oto Hawks won their only Little Sioux Conference football championship with a 6-0 record. Jerry Klindt and Ron Juhler were the co-Head Coaches.

Anthon won the 1949 State Fall Baseball Championship.
