= Lakota Community School District =

Defunct school district in Iowa, United States

Lakota Consolidated School District was a school district serving Lakota, Iowa.

For a number of years in the early 1970s, the Lakota Consolidated School and the neighboring Ledyard Community School District had held some joint elementary classes, an arrangement which was hastily abandoned when it was found to be in violation of existing Iowa law. Meanwhile, the two districts, both among Iowa's smallest, and which had begun discussing the possibility of eventual merger, were informed that such a merger would not be permitted, as the proposed new district would still have fewer than 400 students, then the minimum number required for a newly-merged district. In 1977, Ledyard opted to merge with the Swea City Community School District, to form the North Kossuth Community School District. Meanwhile, Lakota continued on its own.

In the fall of 1987, the Lakota district and the Buffalo Center–Rake Community School District entered into a grade-sharing arrangement in which students from both districts attended the Buffalo Center–Rake secondary school, and which had the same principal for the elementary level. The arrangement had been approved by both school boards on January 12, 1987. Each district continued to retain its own superintendent.

In 1989, the Titonka Community School District began a program of sharing academic, athletic, and extracurricular activities with Buffalo Center–Rake. On July 1, 1989, Lakota entered into a grade-sharing arrangement with the Buffalo Center–Rake, Thompson and Titonka school districts. Earlier that year those districts and the Woden–Crystal Lake Community School District held discussions about a comprehensive plan for their region.

On July 1, 1992, the Buffalo Center–Rake and Lakota districts merged into the Buffalo Center–Rake–Lakota Community School District. The grade-sharing arrangement continued with the new district until 1995. Lakota's school mascot was the Eagles, and their school colors were purple and white. Despite its small enrollment, Lakota High School's girls' basketball team had been among the area's best for a number of years, winning several State Line Conference championships, and advancing to within one game of the State Tournament in both 1975 and 1977.
