= Crystal Township, Hancock County, Iowa =

Crystal Township
- Township
- Location in Hancock County
- Coordinates: 43°13′13″N 93°47′36″W
- Country: United States
- State: Iowa
- County: Hancock

Area
  - Total: 35.51 sq mi (91.96 km^{2})
  - Land: 35.11 sq mi (90.93 km^{2})
  - Water: 0.40 sq mi (1.03 km^{2}) 1.12%
- Elevation: 1,299 ft (396 m)

Population (2000)
  - Total: 529
  - Density: 15/sq mi (5.8/km^{2})
- Time zone: UTC-6 (CST)
  - Summer (DST): UTC-5 (CDT)
- ZIP codes: 50423, 50432, 50436
- GNIS feature ID: 0467668

Crystal Township is one of sixteen townships in Hancock County, Iowa, USA. As of the 2000 census, its population was 529.

== History ==
Crystal Township was founded in 1869. The township was named from Crystal Lake.

== Geography ==
According to the United States Census Bureau, Crystal Township covers an area of 35.5 square miles (91.96 square kilometers); of this, 35.11 square miles (90.93 square kilometers, 98.88 percent) is land and 0.4 square miles (1.03 square kilometers, 1.12 percent) is water.

=== Cities, towns, villages ===
- Crystal Lake

=== Adjacent townships ===
- Linden Township, Winnebago County (north)
- Forest Township, Winnebago County (northeast)
- Madison Township (east)
- Garfield Township (southeast)
- Britt Township (south)
- Orthel Township (southwest)
- Bingham Township (west)
- Grant Township, Winnebago County (northwest)

=== Cemeteries ===
The township contains Crystal Township Cemetery.

=== Major highways ===
- Iowa Highway 111

=== Airports and landing strips ===
- South 80 Field

=== Lakes ===
- Crystal Lake

=== Landmarks ===
- Crystal Lake Roadside Park
- Ellsworth College Park

== School districts ==
- Garner–Hayfield–Ventura Community School District
- West Hancock Community School District
- Woden–Crystal Lake Community School District

== Political districts ==
- Iowa's 4th congressional district
- State House District 11
- State Senate District 6
