= Bingham Township, Hancock County, Iowa =

Bingham Township
- Township
- Location in Hancock County
- Coordinates: 43°12′48″N 93°54′48″W
- Country: United States
- State: Iowa
- County: Hancock

Area
  - Total: 35.36 sq mi (91.58 km^{2})
  - Land: 35.28 sq mi (91.38 km^{2})
  - Water: 0.081 sq mi (0.21 km^{2}) 0.22%
- Elevation: 1,250 ft (381 m)

Population (2000)
  - Total: 487
  - Density: 14/sq mi (5.3/km^{2})
- Time zone: UTC-6 (CST)
  - Summer (DST): UTC-5 (CDT)
- ZIP codes: 50423, 50480, 50483, 50484
- GNIS feature ID: 0467454

Bingham Township is one of sixteen townships in Hancock County, Iowa, United States. At the 2000 census, its population was 487.

== History ==
Bingham Township was organized in 1878. Bingham is the name of John Bingham, a pioneer settler from England.

== Geography ==
According to the United States Census Bureau, Bingham Township covers an area of 35.36 square miles (91.6 km^{2}) (91.58 square kilometers); of which 35.28 square miles (91.4 km^{2}) (99.78 percent) is land and 0.08 square miles (0.21 km^{2}) (0.22 percent) is water.

=== Cities, towns, villages ===
- Woden

=== Adjacent townships ===
- Grant Township, Winnebago County (north)
- Linden Township, Winnebago County (northeast)
- Crystal Township (east)
- Britt Township (southeast)
- Orthel Township (south)
- Wesley Township, Kossuth County (southwest)
- Buffalo Township, Kossuth County (west)
- German Township, Kossuth County (northwest)

=== Cemeteries ===
The township contains three cemeteries: Bingham Township, Christian Reformed and Immanuel Lutheran Church.

=== Major highways ===
- Iowa Highway 111

== School districts ==
- Titonka Consolidated School District
- Woden–Crystal Lake Community School District

== Political districts ==
- Iowa's 4th congressional district
- State House District 11
- State Senate District 6
