= Madison Township, Hancock County, Iowa =

Madison Township
- Township
- Location in Hancock County
- Coordinates: 43°12′55″N 93°40′19″W
- Country: United States
- State: Iowa
- County: Hancock

Area
  - Total: 35.00 sq mi (90.65 km^{2})
  - Land: 35.00 sq mi (90.65 km^{2})
  - Water: 0 sq mi (0 km^{2}) 0%
- Elevation: 1,230 ft (375 m)

Population (2000)
  - Total: 775
  - Density: 22/sq mi (8.5/km^{2})
- Time zone: UTC-6 (CST)
  - Summer (DST): UTC-5 (CDT)
- ZIP codes: 50436, 50438
- GNIS feature ID: 0468321

Madison Township is one of sixteen townships in Hancock County, Iowa, USA. At the 2000 census, its population was 775.

== History ==
Madison Township was organized in 1858.

== Geography ==
According to the United States Census Bureau, Madison Township covers an area of 35 square miles (90.65 square kilometers).

=== Cities, towns, villages ===
- Forest City (south one-third)

=== Unincorporated towns ===
- Hawley at 43.212735°N 93.679660°W
- Hayfield at 43.176625°N 93.695216°W

(This list is based on USGS data and may include former settlements.)

=== Adjacent townships ===
- Forest Township, Winnebago County (north)
- Mount Valley Township, Winnebago County (northeast)
- Ellington Township (east)
- Concord Township (southeast)
- Garfield Township (south)
- Britt Township (southwest)
- Crystal Township (west)
- Linden Township, Winnebago County (northwest)

=== Cemeteries ===
The township contains Madison Cemetery.

=== Major highways ===
- U.S. Route 69

=== Airports and landing strips ===
- Forest City Municipal Airport

== School districts ==
- Forest City Community School District
- Garner–Hayfield–Ventura Community School District
- Woden–Crystal Lake Community School District [defunct, absolved by neighboring districts]

== Political districts ==
- Iowa's 4th congressional district
- State House District 11
- State Senate District 6
