= Vinje, Iowa =

- Unincorporated community
- Location within Iowa
- Coordinates: 43°28′24″N 93°40′37″W
- Country: United States
- State: Iowa
- County: Winnebago
- Elevation: 1,263 ft (385 m)
- Time zone: UTC-6 (Central (CST))
  - Summer (DST): UTC-5 (CDT)
- Area code: 641
- GNIS feature ID: 464787

Vinje is an unincorporated community in Logan Township, Winnebago County, Iowa, United States.

Vinje was founded by Norwegian settlers and is the site of an 1880 church. The community was the site of an 1894 post office and 20th century creamery. Lack of railroad access inhibited the growth of the community.

== Geography ==
Vinje is located along county highways A16 and R50, 3 miles (4.8 km) west of Scarville. Vinje is just north of the Harmon Lake Wildlife Management Area.

== History ==
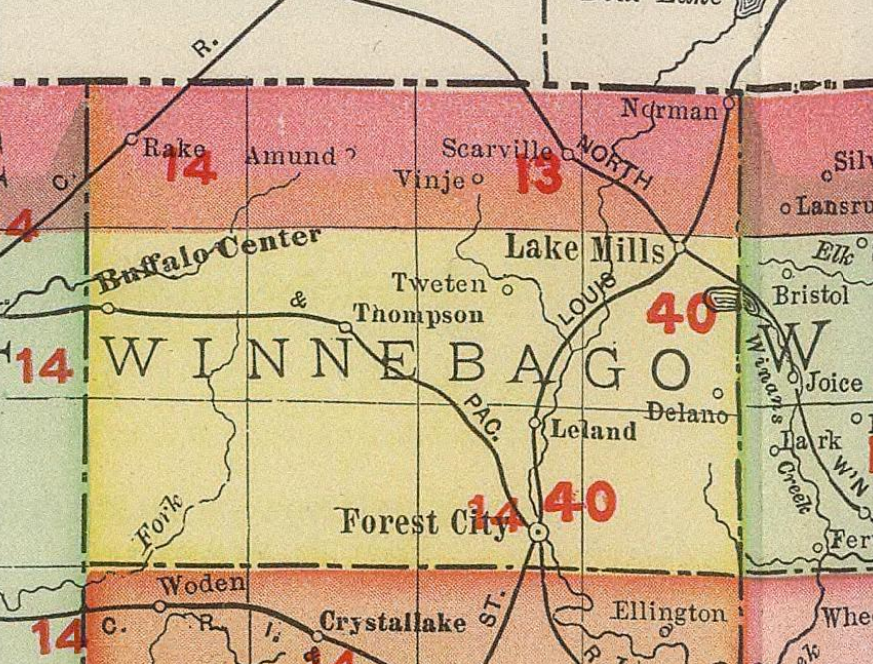
Vinje in Winnebago County, 1903

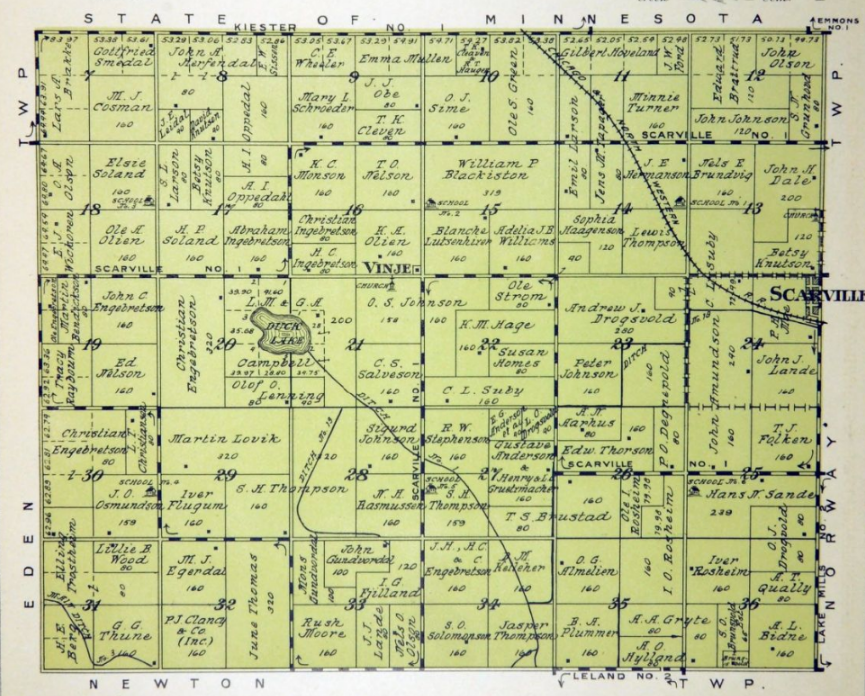
Vinje and Scarville in Logan Township, Winnebago County, Iowa, in 1913

Vinje was founded by Norwegian settlers, and the name Vinje is of Norwegian origin. Bethel Lutheran Church was founded in 1880; the original church was burned in 1949, and was replaced with a new church in summer 1955. The church at Vinje still holds services.

The post office in Vinje was established in 1894.

Circa 1900, Vinje was home to the Vinje Creamery Association. The milk station was consolidated into the Thompson Cooperative Creamery in 1897.

The Vinje post office was discontinued in 1907.

Vinje's decline occurred because — like other communities such as Ratna, Tweten, and Delano — it did not have rail access, a fact noted by county historians in 1917. In 1924, Vinje's population was 23 residents.

In 1940, Vinje's population was 13.

The Harmon Lake State Gaming Area is located near Vinje. It was established in 1950 to give area residents an established area for duck hunting.

The community, which had a reported population of 2 in 2011, is home to Vinje's Pub and Grub.

== See also ==
- Amund, Iowa, also in Winnebago County
