= Mike Stensrud =

American football player (1956–2024)

No. 67, 74, 94, 75
- Positions: Defensive end, defensive tackle

Personal information
- Born: February 19, 1956; Forest City, Iowa, U.S.
- Died: August 23, 2024 (aged 68); Lake Mills, Iowa, U.S.
- Listed height: 6 ft 5 in (1.96 m)
- Listed weight: 280 lb (127 kg)

Career information
- High school: Lake Mills (IA)
- College: Iowa State
- NFL draft: 1979: 2nd round, 31st overall pick

Career history
- Houston Oilers (1979–1985); Minnesota Vikings (1986); Tampa Bay Buccaneers (1987); Kansas City Chiefs (1988); Washington Redskins (1989)

Awards and highlights
- Second-team All-American (1978); 2× First-team All-Big Eight (1977, 1978); Second-team All-Big Eight (1976)

Career NFL statistics
- Sacks: 29.5
- Fumble recoveries: 6
- Interceptions: 2
- Stats at Pro Football Reference

Michael Iver Stensrud (February 19, 1956 – August 23, 2024) was an American professional football player who was a defensive lineman for five teams in 11 seasons in the National Football League (NFL). He wrestled for Lake Mills High School, winning the unlimited heavyweight bracket in the state tournament. He played college football for the Iowa State Cyclones, also tried out for the Cyclones wrestling team, and was selected in the second round of the 1979 NFL draft.

After retiring from professional football, Stensrud lived in Houston, Texas. At his wife Laura's urging, Stensrud moved back to his hometown of Lake Mills, Iowa, where he worked at a lumber yard. In 2000, Stensrud was inducted into the Iowa State Cyclones Hall of Fame.

Stensrud coached the Lake Mills High football team while his son Andy played. Andy was also recruited by Iowa State University as a basketball player. During Andy's stint on the Iowa State Cyclones football team, he roomed with J. J. Moses. Andy Stensrud was not selected in the 2001 NFL draft, signed with the Arizona Cardinals as a free agent, joined the New York Giants for training camp the following season, and was signed by the Houston Texans in 2003.

Stensrud had two other sons, Kevin and Michael.

Stensrud served on the Winnebago County Board of Supervisors from 2009 to 2020. Stensrud, a Republican, was unopposed in his 2012 reelection bid, faced Gary Ludwig in the 2016 Republican Party primary and Democratic candidate Mike Huan in the subsequent general election, then defeated Huan again in 2020.

Stensrud died in Lake Mills, Iowa, on August 23, 2024, at the age of 68.
