= Amund, Iowa =

- Unincorporated community
- Location within Iowa
- Coordinates: 43°28′24″N 93°47′36″W
- Country: United States
- State: Iowa
- County: Winnebago
- Elevation: 1,240 ft (380 m)
- Time zone: UTC-6 (Central (CST))
  - Summer (DST): UTC-5 (CDT)
- Area code: 641
- GNIS feature ID: 464046

Amund was a rural unincorporated community in Eden Township, Winnebago County, Iowa, United States. Founded in the late 1800s, the community was considered prosperous in the early 20th century, but the population remained small. By the 1970s, the town was one of 11 abandoned communities in Winnebago County.

== Geography ==
Amund is located along county highways A16 and R34. The community is in Eden Township northwest of the Good Neighbors Marsh Wildlife Management Area. The community was in the northwest corner of section 22 of Eden Township.

== History ==
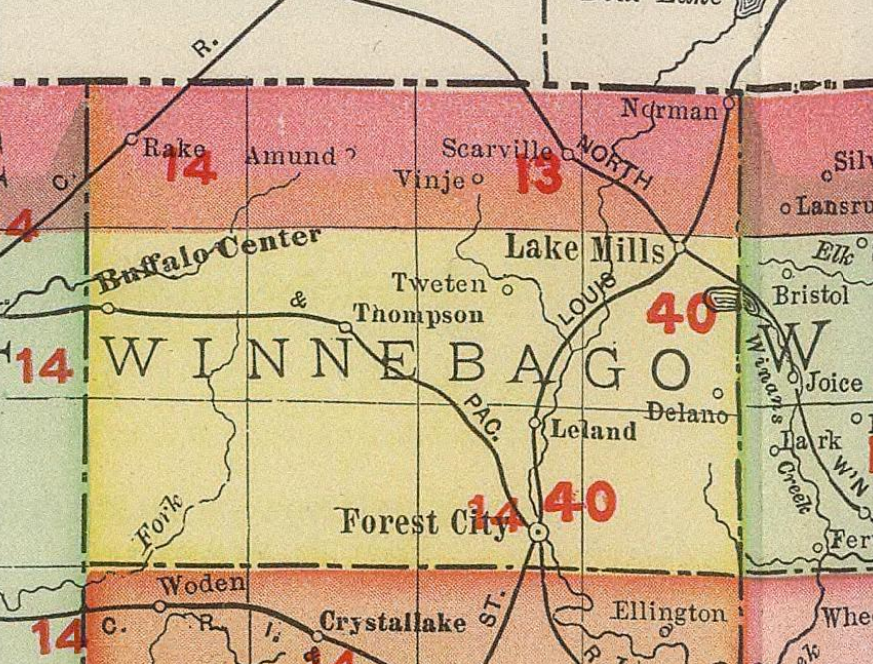
Winnebago county Iowa 1903

A post office operated in Amund from 1888 to 1907. The community was named for postmaster Amund A. Fosness, who came to the US from Norway in 1867, and settled in Iowa. It had a skimming station, store, and blacksmith shop, among other similar concerns. The community was reported by the Forest City Summit to be prosperous, and there were plans for a religious periodical to be published in the community. A school was located a mile north of the store.

Amund's milk station used large volume separators to skim off cream, and was consolidated into the Thompson Cooperative Creamery in 1897.

Amund's population, in 1902, was 22.

The community was meant to serve the farming area, and the lack of a railroad led to its dissolution. The local Forest City Summit newspaper reported in 1955 that the former location was still known as Amund corner. It noted that early settlers remembered Fourth of July celebrations at Amund with baseball games and bowery dances.

In 1976, the Mason City Globe-Gazette named Amund among the eleven abandoned towns in Winnebago County, the others being Benson Grove, Deering, Delano, Grytte, Hollandale, Mount Valley, Norman, Ratna, Steen, and Tweeten.

== See also ==
- Vinje, Iowa
