= Judy Lee Klemesrud =

American journalist (1939–1985)

Judy Lee Klemesrud (June 11, 1939 – October 12, 1985) was a writer for The New York Times from 1966 until her death in 1985.

== Biography ==
Judy Lee Klemesrud was born on June 11, 1939, in Thompson, Iowa, to Glee Catherine Florence Klemesrud (1909–1986) and Theo Severin Klemesrud (1902–1995). She had a sister, Candace K. Klemesrud (1947–1989) and a brother, Tom Theo Klemesrud. Her father, who survived both his daughters, owned and published the Thompson Courier and Rake Register in Winnebago County, Iowa.

She attended the University of Iowa from 1958 until she was graduated in 1961. She later attended the Columbia University School of Journalism. While attending the University of Iowa, she worked as an editor at The Daily Iowan. She then spent four years as a reporter for the Chicago Daily News. She then spent 19 years at The New York Times beginning in 1966, and ending at her death in 1985. She also wrote for such magazines as: Esquire, Cosmopolitan, Ladies Home Journal, Redbook, and The New York Times Magazine. In 1968, she signed the "Writers and Editors War Tax Protest" pledge, vowing to refuse tax payments in protest against the Vietnam War.

Judy wrote an op-ed piece on October 28, 1970, titled "Those Treats May Be Tricks," on Halloween candy being poisoned. Despite very few documented instances of this, a nationwide panic on the subject has lasted to contemporary times.

Klemesrud wrote "Donald Trump, Real Estate Promoter, Builds Image as He Buys Buildings," the first Donald Trump profile, which appeared in the New York Times in November 1976.

== Death ==
Klemesrud died of breast cancer on October 12, 1985, at the age of 46. She is buried in Rose Hill Cemetery, in her native Thompson.

== Awards ==
She won various awards for her work at The New York Times. These included two Page One Awards from the Newspaper Guild of New York for her 1973 story, In a Small Town U.S.A., Women's Lib is Either a Joke or a Rarity, and a 1983 profile on tennis celebrity Ivan Lendl. In 1969 she won a Front Page Award from the Newspaper Women's Club of New York for a story about adoptions by single women.
