= Buffalo Center, Iowa =

- City
- Location of Buffalo Center, Iowa
- Coordinates: 43°23′22″N 93°56′34″W
- Country: USA
- State: Iowa
- County: Winnebago

Area
  - Total: 1.07 sq mi (2.77 km^{2})
  - Land: 1.07 sq mi (2.77 km^{2})
  - Water: 0 sq mi (0.00 km^{2})
- Elevation: 1,181 ft (360 m)

Population (2020)
  - Total: 857
  - Density: 800.3/sq mi (308.98/km^{2})
- Time zone: UTC-6 (Central (CST))
  - Summer (DST): UTC-5 (CDT)
- ZIP code: 50424
- Area code: 641
- FIPS code: 19-09280
- GNIS feature ID: 2393457
- Website: www.buffalocenteriowa.com

Buffalo Center is a city in Winnebago County, Iowa, United States. The population was 857 at the time of the 2020 census.

== History ==
Buffalo Center was platted in 1892, and was incorporated as a city later that same year. In 1996, Buffalo Center officially became the host community of the newly-formed North Iowa Community School.

== Geography ==
According to the United States Census Bureau, the city has a total area of 1.07 square miles (2.77 km^{2}), all land.

== Demographics ==
Historical populations
Year	Pop.	±%
1900	875	—
1910	753	−13.9%
1920	894	+18.7%
1930	768	−14.1%
1940	911	+18.6%
1950	1,087	+19.3%
1960	1,140	+4.9%
1970	1,118	−1.9%
1980	1,233	+10.3%
1990	1,081	−12.3%
2000	963	−10.9%
2010	905	−6.0%
2020	857	−5.3%
Source:"U.S. Census website". United States Census Bureau. and Iowa Data Center; Source: U.S. Decennial Census

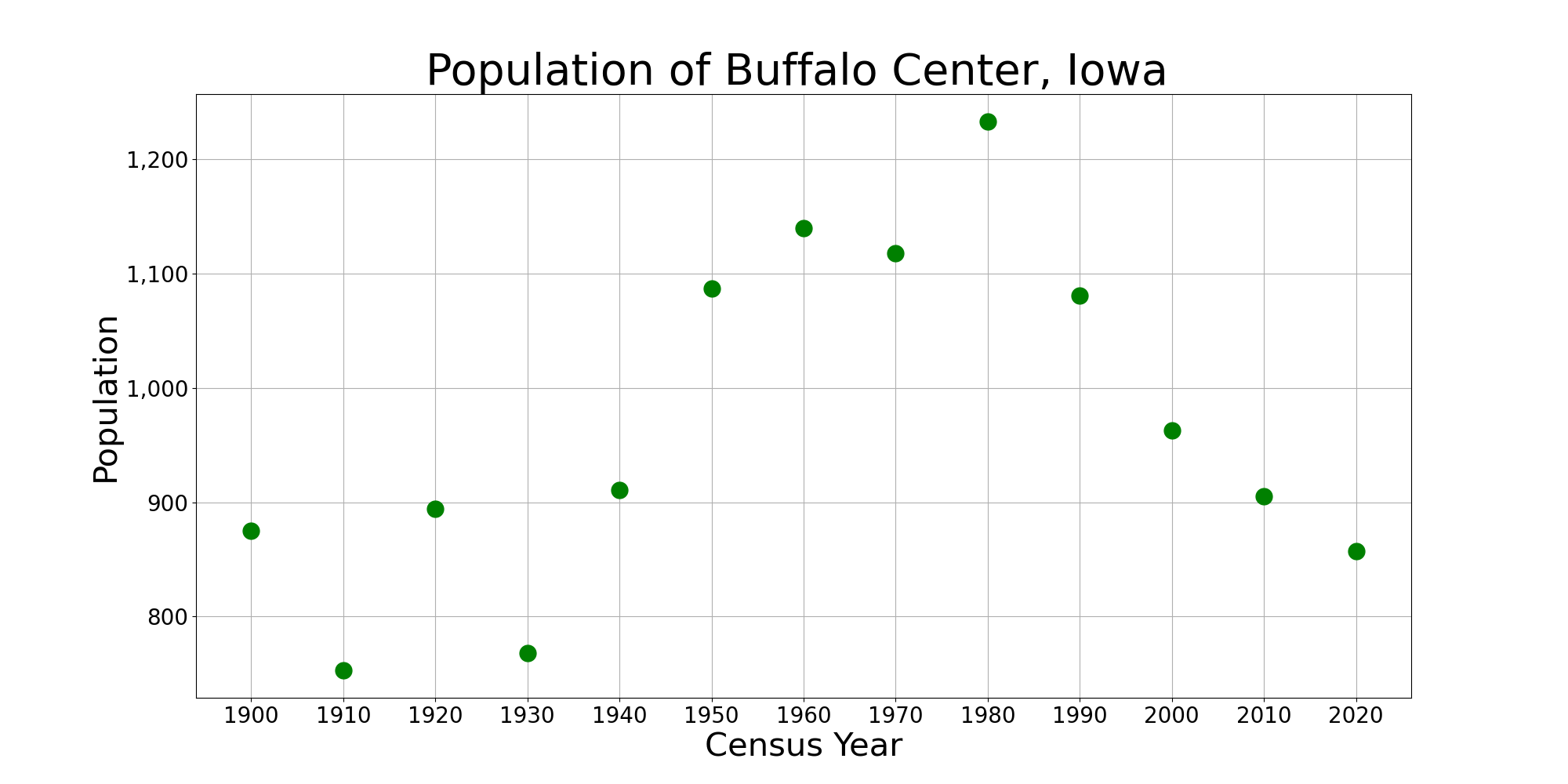
The population of Buffalo Center, Iowa from US census data

=== 2020 census ===
As of the census of 2020, there were 857 people, 359 households, and 206 families residing in the city. The population density was 800.3 inhabitants per square mile (309.0/km^{2}). There were 442 housing units at an average density of 412.7 per square mile (159.4/km^{2}). The racial makeup of the city was 92.5% White, 0.4% Black or African American, 0.0% Native American, 0.5% Asian, 0.0% Pacific Islander, 2.2% from other races and 4.4% from two or more races. Hispanic or Latino persons of any race comprised 6.2% of the population.

Of the 359 households, 22.6% of which had children under the age of 18 living with them, 48.2% were married couples living together, 4.2% were cohabitating couples, 27.9% had a female householder with no spouse or partner present and 19.8% had a male householder with no spouse or partner present. 42.6% of all households were non-families. 37.3% of all households were made up of individuals, 23.4% had someone living alone who was 65 years old or older.

The median age in the city was 47.7 years. 22.3% of the residents were under the age of 20; 4.7% were between the ages of 20 and 24; 21.4% were from 25 and 44; 21.5% were from 45 and 64; and 30.2% were 65 years of age or older. The gender makeup of the city was 47.3% male and 52.7% female.

=== 2010 census ===
As of the census of 2010, there were 905 people, 405 households, and 242 families living in the city. The population density was 845.8 inhabitants per square mile (326.6/km^{2}). There were 465 housing units at an average density of 434.6 per square mile (167.8/km^{2}). The racial makeup of the city was 96.1% White, 0.6% African American, 0.6% Native American, 0.2% Asian, 2.1% from other races, and 0.4% from two or more races. Hispanic or Latino of any race were 6.0% of the population.

There were 405 households, of which 27.4% had children under the age of 18 living with them, 47.4% were married couples living together, 7.9% had a female householder with no husband present, 4.4% had a male householder with no wife present, and 40.2% were non-families. 37.8% of all households were made up of individuals, and 23% had someone living alone who was 65 years of age or older. The average household size was 2.15 and the average family size was 2.81.

The median age in the city was 48.3 years. 23.1% of residents were under the age of 18; 4.8% were between the ages of 18 and 24; 17.9% were from 25 to 44; 24% were from 45 to 64; and 30.2% were 65 years of age or older. The gender makeup of the city was 46.6% male and 53.4% female.

=== 2000 census ===
As of the census of 2000, there were 963 people, 432 households, and 269 families living in the city. The population density was 879.3 inhabitants per square mile (339.5/km^{2}). There were 467 housing units at an average density of 426.4 per square mile (164.6/km^{2}). The racial makeup of the city was 98.44% White, 0.31% Asian, 1.04% from other races, and 0.21% from two or more races. Hispanic or Latino of any race were 2.60% of the population.

There were 432 households, out of which 22.5% had children under the age of 18 living with them, 54.4% were married couples living together, 5.8% had a female householder with no husband present, and 37.7% were non-families. 35.9% of all households were made up of individuals, and 24.8% had someone living alone who was 65 years of age or older. The average household size was 2.10 and the average family size was 2.70.

19.6% are under the age of 18, 5.7% from 18 to 24, 17.0% from 25 to 44, 20.8% from 45 to 64, and 36.9% who were 65 years of age or older. The median age was 49 years. For every 100 females, there were 88.5 males. For every 100 females age 18 and over, there were 81.7 males.

The median income for a household in the city was $30,694, and the median income for a family was $43,333. Males had a median income of $33,542 versus $21,875 for females. The per capita income for the city was $17,944. About 6.5% of families and 9.0% of the population were below the poverty line, including 8.6% of those under age 18 and 12.9% of those age 65 or over.

== Education ==
It is within the North Iowa Community School District, which was established on July 1, 1996, by the merger of the Buffalo Center–Rake–Lakota Community School District and the Thompson Community School District.

An independent school district coinciding with the Buffalo township was established after a vote on December 13, 1895. It was renamed in 1897 to the Buffalo Center Consolidated School District. The Buffalo Center Community School District was formed on July 1, 1954, by the merger of five one-room schoolhouse districts, with the establishment of a centralized school approved by the board in August of that year. The Buffalo Center district merged with the Rake Community School District to form the Buffalo Center–Rake district on July 1, 1978. On July 1, 1992, Buffalo Center-Rake merged with the Lakota Consolidated School District to form the Buffalo Center–Rake–Lakota district, and that district merged with Thompson to form North Iowa in 1996. In March 2024 North Iowa declared to switch do a 4 day school week proposed by superintendent Joe Erickson.

Buffalo Center has a high school, North Iowa Community School, located in the town. It was the first consolidated school west of the Mississippi River. North Iowa Community School consists of students from Buffalo Center, as well as the three surrounding, smaller communities of Lakota, located to the west; Rake, to the north; and Thompson, to the east. The school's mascot is the Bison, which had been Buffalo Center's mascot for many years. At the time of Buffalo Center's merger with Rake in 1978, the Bison had been members of the eight-team North Iowa Conference since the league was founded in 1929. Meanwhile, the Rake High School Tigers, Lakota Eagles, and Thompson Cubs had all belonged to the 11-member State Line Conference. Thompson had been one of the six founding members, along with Ledyard, Swea City, Ringsted, Armstrong, and Burt. Lakota had joined the State Line Conference in 1942, and Rake in 1958. Rake had been the only member of the Conference to not have girls' basketball.

In 2015, North Iowa High School became one of the nine founding members of the Top of Iowa Conference - West.

== Notable person ==
- Les Feldick (1927-2023), Bible Teacher, "Through The Bible" Television Program.
