= Top of Iowa Conference =

Iowa High School athletic conference

- Conference: IHSAA / IGHSAU
- Founded: 2015
- Sports fielded: 13
- No. of teams: 17
- Region: Northern Iowa
- Website: https://www.topofiowaconference.org/

Top of Iowa Conference School Locations in Iowa

The Top of Iowa Conference is a high school athletic conference in northern Iowa. The schools range in size from 1A (the smallest classification in Iowa) to 3A (the second largest).

Beginning in 2015–16, the North Iowa Conference and the Corn Bowl Conference combined to create the Top of Iowa Conference with two divisions.

The Top of Iowa Conference–West includes Eagle Grove, Belmond–Klemme, Garner–Hayfield–Ventura, West Hancock, Forest City, Lake Mills, North Iowa, Bishop Garrigan, and North Union. The Top of Iowa Conference–East includes Osage, Mason City Newman, West Fork, North Butler, Central Springs, Northwood-Kensett, St. Ansgar, and Nashua-Plainfield.

On December 6, 2024, Forest City, Garner-Hayfield-Ventura, and Eagle Grove announced they would be leaving the conference for the North Central Conference.

On February 2, 2026, North Butler and Nashua-Plainfield accepted invitations to join the Iowa Star Conference.

== Members ==
=== East ===
Institution	Location	Mascot	Colors	Affiliation	2026-2027 BEDS
Central Springs	Manly	Panthers		Public	175
Nashua-Plainfield	Nashua	Huskies		Public	142
Newman Catholic	Mason City	Knights		Private	108
North Butler	Greene	Bearcats		Public	117
Northwood-Kensett	Northwood	Vikings		Public	97
Osage	Osage	Green Devils		Public	209
Saint Ansgar	Saint Ansgar	Saints		Public	129
West Fork	Sheffield	Warhawks		Public	149

=== West ===
Institution	Location	Mascot	Colors	Affiliation	2026-2027 BEDS
Belmond-Klemme	Belmond	Broncos		Public	143
Bishop Garrigan Catholic	Algona	Golden Bears		Private	98
Lake Mills	Lake Mills	Bulldogs		Public	134
North Iowa	Buffalo Center	Bison		Public	105
North Union	Armstrong	Warriors		Public	117
West Hancock	Britt	Eagles		Public	126

RED highlighted indicating schools leaving the conference.
