= Rake, Iowa =

- City
- Location of Rake, Iowa
- Coordinates: 43°28′50″N 93°55′11″W
- Country: USA
- State: Iowa
- County: Winnebago

Area
  - Total: 0.76 sq mi (1.96 km^{2})
  - Land: 0.76 sq mi (1.96 km^{2})
  - Water: 0 sq mi (0.00 km^{2})
- Elevation: 1,148 ft (350 m)

Population (2020)
  - Total: 186
  - Density: 245.9/sq mi (94.94/km^{2})
- Time zone: UTC-6 (Central (CST))
  - Summer (DST): UTC-5 (CDT)
- ZIP code: 50465
- Area code: 641
- FIPS code: 19-65415
- GNIS feature ID: 2396307

Rake is a city in Winnebago County, Iowa, United States. The population was 186 at the time of the 2020 census.

== History ==
Rake was platted in 1900. The community was named after Andrew Danielson Rake, a pioneer citizen of the area.

== Geography ==
According to the United States Census Bureau, the town has a total area of 0.81 square miles (2.10 km^{2}), all land.

== Demographics ==
Historical populations
Year	Pop.	±%
1910	163	—
1920	254	+55.8%
1930	310	+22.0%
1940	329	+6.1%
1950	351	+6.7%
1960	328	−6.6%
1970	324	−1.2%
1980	283	−12.7%
1990	238	−15.9%
2000	227	−4.6%
2010	225	−0.9%
2020	186	−17.3%
Source:"U.S. Census website". United States Census Bureau. and Iowa Data Center; Source: U.S. Decennial Census

=== 2020 census ===
As of the census of 2020, there were 186 people, 92 households, and 57 families residing in the city. The population density was 245.9 inhabitants per square mile (94.9/km^{2}). There were 107 housing units at an average density of 141.5 per square mile (54.6/km^{2}). The racial makeup of the city was 88.7% White, 5.9% Black or African American, 0.0% Native American, 0.0% Asian, 0.0% Pacific Islander, 3.2% from other races and 2.2% from two or more races. Hispanic or Latino persons of any race comprised 6.5% of the population.

Of the 92 households, 19.6% of which had children under the age of 18 living with them, 41.3% were married couples living together, 7.6% were cohabitating couples, 22.8% had a female householder with no spouse or partner present and 28.3% had a male householder with no spouse or partner present. 38.0% of all households were non-families. 32.6% of all households were made up of individuals, 10.9% had someone living alone who was 65 years old or older.

The median age in the city was 49.2 years. 15.6% of the residents were under the age of 20; 7.0% were between the ages of 20 and 24; 17.2% were from 25 and 44; 39.2% were from 45 and 64; and 21.0% were 65 years of age or older. The gender makeup of the city was 58.6% male and 41.4% female.

=== 2010 census ===
As of the census of 2010, there were 225 people, 102 households, and 58 families living in the town. The population density was 277.8 inhabitants per square mile (107.3/km^{2}). There were 117 housing units at an average density of 144.4 per square mile (55.8/km^{2}). The racial makeup of the town was 91.1% White, 0.4% Native American, 7.1% from other races, and 1.3% from two or more races. Hispanic or Latino of any race were 19.6% of the population.

There were 102 households, of which 22.5% had children under the age of 18 living with them, 38.2% were married couples living together, 10.8% had a female householder with no husband present, 7.8% had a male householder with no wife present, and 43.1% were non-families. 34.3% of all households were made up of individuals, and 18.7% had someone living alone who was 65 years of age or older. The average household size was 2.21 and the average family size was 2.83.

The median age in the town was 41.7 years. 19.6% of residents were under the age of 18; 5.7% were between the ages of 18 and 24; 27.5% were from 25 to 44; 25.8% were from 45 to 64; and 21.3% were 65 years of age or older. The gender makeup of the town was 53.8% male and 46.2% female.

=== 2000 census ===
As of the census of 2000, there were 227 people, 110 households, and 53 families living in the town. The population density was 225.3 inhabitants per square mile (87.0/km^{2}). There were 119 housing units at an average density of 118.1 per square mile (45.6/km^{2}). The racial makeup of the town was 92.51% White, 1.76% Native American, 5.73% from other races. Hispanic or Latino of any race were 7.93% of the population.

There were 110 households, out of which 19.1% had children under the age of 18 living with them, 40.0% were married couples living together, 3.6% had a female householder with no husband present, and 51.8% were non-families. 44.5% of all households were made up of individuals, and 29.1% had someone living alone who was 65 years of age or older. The average household size was 2.06 and the average family size was 2.89.

In the town, the population was spread out, with 21.1% under the age of 18, 9.3% from 18 to 24, 24.2% from 25 to 44, 22.0% from 45 to 64, and 23.3% who were 65 years of age or older. The median age was 40 years. For every 100 females, there were 100.9 males. For every 100 females age 18 and over, there were 105.7 males.

The median income for a household in the town was $24,375, and the median income for a family was $33,750. Males had a median income of $25,357 versus $20,625 for females. The per capita income for the town was $15,816. About 7.7% of families and 13.1% of the population were below the poverty line, including 8.5% of those under the age of eighteen and 26.2% of those 65 or over.

== Education ==
Rake is located within the North Iowa Community School District, which was established on July 1, 1996, by the merger of the Buffalo Center–Rake–Lakota Community School District and the Thompson Community School District. The Rake Community School District had consolidated with the Buffalo Center Community School District on July 1, 1978, to form the Buffalo Center–Rake district. On July 1, 1992, that district merged with the Lakota Consolidated School District to form the Buffalo Center–Rake–Lakota district, and that district merged into North Iowa in 1996.
