= King Township, Winnebago County, Iowa =

Township in Winnebago County, Iowa, U.S.

Coordinates: 43.386°N 93.793°W

King Township is a township in Winnebago County, Iowa, United States.

== History ==
King Township was founded in 1886.

In 1894, a tornado destroyed King Township School No. 2. In 1904, a cyclone destroyed King Township School No. 1.

King No. 1, the first school in King Township, was built in 1895, and known as the Amodt school. Its largest attendance was 29 pupils in 1899. The school was destroyed by a cyclone in 1904. After it was rebuilt, it was known as the Sterrenberg school. The school closed in 1944. King No. 2 was built in 1891, and destroyed by a tornado in 1891. The new building, known as the Ambroson school, included a storm cave. Its largest attendance was 35 children. The school closed in 1950. King no. 3 was built in 1896. It was known as the Ellis school, and later as the Lawless school. The school closed in 1953. King no. 4, built in 1887, was known as the Combs school. Its largest attendance was 27 pupils in 1917. The school closed in 1953. King no. 5, the center school of the township, was built in 1879. It was known as the Lynn school, and later as the Lehman school. The building was sold in 1929 and moved, then a new building was built. The largest attendance was 1918, with 21 pupils. King no. 7 was built in 1888, and had three names. It was called the Asmus school for Henry Asmus, the Olson school, as it had many pupils from the Olson family, and finally as the Tinderholt school. The largest attendance was 39 pupils, in 1897. The school closed in 1954. King no. 8 in 1899, at the L.M. Thorsen farm home, and moved to the Stanhope home in 1890. The schoolhouse was built in 1891, and known as the Myhr school. The largest attendance was in 1899, with 30 pupils. King no. 9 was built in 1902. It was known as the Mortenson school, as Mr. Mortenson gave the land for the building. After Mr. Mortenson moved to Thompson, it became known as the Waite school. Its largest attendance was in 1914. The school was closed in 1948, and the building was moved to Thompson, where it became part of the Marion Hageson home.

The Ellis Point Methodist congregation met at the King no. 3 school until purchasing its own building in 1934.
