= Lakota, Iowa =

- City
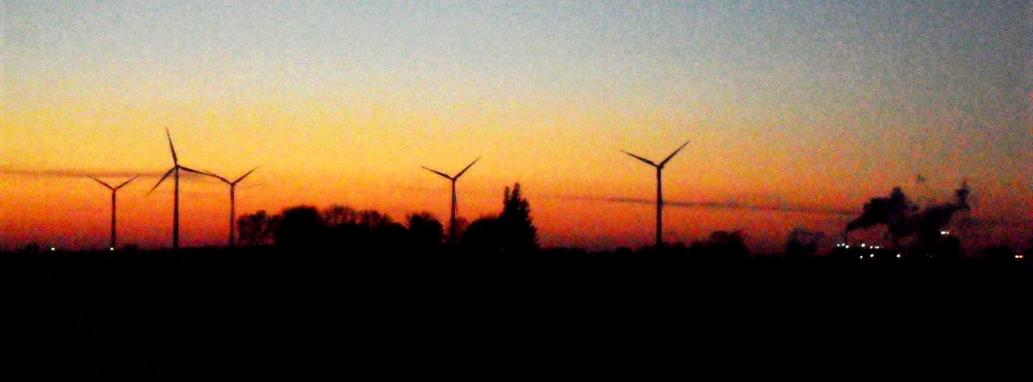
- November sunset in Lakota, Iowa

- Location of Lakota, Iowa
- Coordinates: 43°22′41″N 94°5′39″W
- Country: USA
- State: Iowa
- County: Kossuth
- Established: 1892

Area
  - Total: 0.73 sq mi (1.89 km^{2})
  - Land: 0.73 sq mi (1.89 km^{2})
  - Water: 0 sq mi (0.00 km^{2})
- Elevation: 1,142 ft (348 m)

Population (2020)
  - Total: 267
  - Density: 366.4/sq mi (141.47/km^{2})
- Time zone: UTC-6 (Central (CST))
  - Summer (DST): UTC-5 (CDT)
- ZIP code: 50451
- Area code: 515
- FIPS code: 19-42825
- GNIS feature ID: 2395616
- Website: cityoflakota.org

Lakota is a city in Kossuth County, Iowa, United States. The population was 267 at the time of the 2020 census. Prior to 1919, the town was known as Germania.

== History ==
The present town of Lakota was originally named Germania. The original town site of Germania was surveyed and filed for record by the Northern Iowa Land and Town Lot Company, August 26, 1892. The town received its name from the German heritage of many of the early settlers in the area. In 1918, the hysteria of World War I was sweeping the country. Residents couldn't change their origin to protect themselves from the popular hatred of the time, but they could take the stigma of all things German from the town by wiping its name off the map, which they did. An election was held on October 1, 1918, to vote to change the name of Germania to Lakota. A canvas of the votes showed there were 48 yes and 32 no votes cast. Mayor J. Gus Thaves filed the certificate changing the name to Lakota at the Kossuth County Courthouse on October 16, 1918. However the name was not officially changed by the post office until August 5, 1919. The town was renamed Lakota, an Indian word with several different translations. Some say Lakota means "beautiful prairie" or as other translations say Lakota means "plenty", others say it means "allies".

== Geography ==
According to the United States Census Bureau, the city has a total area of 0.19 square miles (0.49 km^{2}), all land.

== Demographics ==
Historical populations
Year	Pop.	±%
1900	384	—
1910	436	+13.5%
1920	472	+8.3%
1930	409	−13.3%
1940	457	+11.7%
1950	443	−3.1%
1960	459	+3.6%
1970	385	−16.1%
1980	330	−14.3%
1990	281	−14.8%
2000	255	−9.3%
2010	255	+0.0%
2020	267	+4.7%
Source:"U.S. Census website". United States Census Bureau. and Iowa Data Center; Source: U.S. Decennial Census

=== 2020 census ===
As of the census of 2020, there were 267 people, 121 households, and 75 families residing in the city. The population density was 366.5 inhabitants per square mile (141.5/km^{2}). There were 148 housing units at an average density of 203.1 per square mile (78.4/km^{2}). The racial makeup of the city was 89.9% White, 0.7% Black or African American, 0.0% Native American, 0.4% Asian, 0.0% Pacific Islander, 3.0% from other races and 6.0% from two or more races. Hispanic or Latino persons of any race comprised 8.6% of the population.

Of the 121 households, 21.5% of which had children under the age of 18 living with them, 49.6% were married couples living together, 7.4% were cohabitating couples, 20.7% had a female householder with no spouse or partner present and 22.3% had a male householder with no spouse or partner present. 38.0% of all households were non-families. 34.7% of all households were made up of individuals, 14.0% had someone living alone who was 65 years old or older.

The median age in the city was 48.8 years. 24.0% of the residents were under the age of 20; 3.7% were between the ages of 20 and 24; 18.7% were from 25 and 44; 32.2% were from 45 and 64; and 21.3% were 65 years of age or older. The gender makeup of the city was 51.7% male and 48.3% female.

=== 2010 census ===
As of the census of 2010, there were 255 people, 119 households, and 71 families living in the city. The population density was 1,342.1 inhabitants per square mile (518.2/km^{2}). There were 136 housing units at an average density of 715.8 per square mile (276.4/km^{2}). The racial makeup of the city was 94.1% White, 0.8% Native American, 3.9% from other races, and 1.2% from two or more races. Hispanic or Latino of any race were 5.9% of the population.

There were 119 households, of which 18.5% had children under the age of 18 living with them, 47.1% were married couples living together, 7.6% had a female householder with no husband present, 5.0% had a male householder with no wife present, and 40.3% were non-families. 37.0% of all households were made up of individuals, and 15.1% had someone living alone who was 65 years of age or older. The average household size was 2.14 and the average family size was 2.72.

The median age in the city was 48.4 years. 19.6% of residents were under the age of 18; 9.4% were between the ages of 18 and 24; 15.6% were from 25 to 44; 31% were from 45 to 64; and 24.3% were 65 years of age or older. The gender makeup of the city was 51.4% male and 48.6% female.

=== 2000 census ===
As of the census of 2000, there were 255 people, 118 households, and 71 families living in the city. The population density was 1,334.7 inhabitants per square mile (515.3/km^{2}). There were 141 housing units at an average density of 738.0 per square mile (284.9/km^{2}). The racial makeup of the city was 98.43% White, 0.39% from other races, and 1.18% from two or more races. Hispanic or Latino of any race were 3.53% of the population.

There were 118 households, out of which 25.4% had children under the age of 18 living with them, 52.5% were married couples living together, 6.8% had a female householder with no husband present, and 39.8% were non-families. 38.1% of all households were made up of individuals, and 22.9% had someone living alone who was 65 years of age or older. The average household size was 2.16 and the average family size was 2.85.

In the city, the population was spread out, with 24.3% under the age of 18, 6.7% from 18 to 24, 23.5% from 25 to 44, 21.2% from 45 to 64, and 24.3% who were 65 years of age or older. The median age was 41 years. For every 100 females, there were 88.9 males. For every 100 females age 18 and over, there were 94.9 males.

The median income for a household in the city was $27,917, and the median income for a family was $43,500. Males had a median income of $30,357 versus $18,750 for females. The per capita income for the city was $18,572. About 14.7% of families and 19.4% of the population were below the poverty line, including 23.1% of those under the age of eighteen and 28.1% of those 65 or over.

== Education ==
Lakota is within the North Iowa Community School District, which was established on July 1, 1996, by the merger of the Buffalo Center–Rake–Lakota Community School District and the Thompson Community School District. On July 1, 1992, the Lakota Consolidated School District merged with the Buffalo Center–Rake Community School District to form the Buffalo Center–Rake–Lakota district, and that district merged into North Iowa in 1996.

== Notable people ==
- Timothy Ley, hematologist and cancer biologist
- Paul Ukena, opera singer.
- Don I. Wortman, federal government executive

== Gallery ==
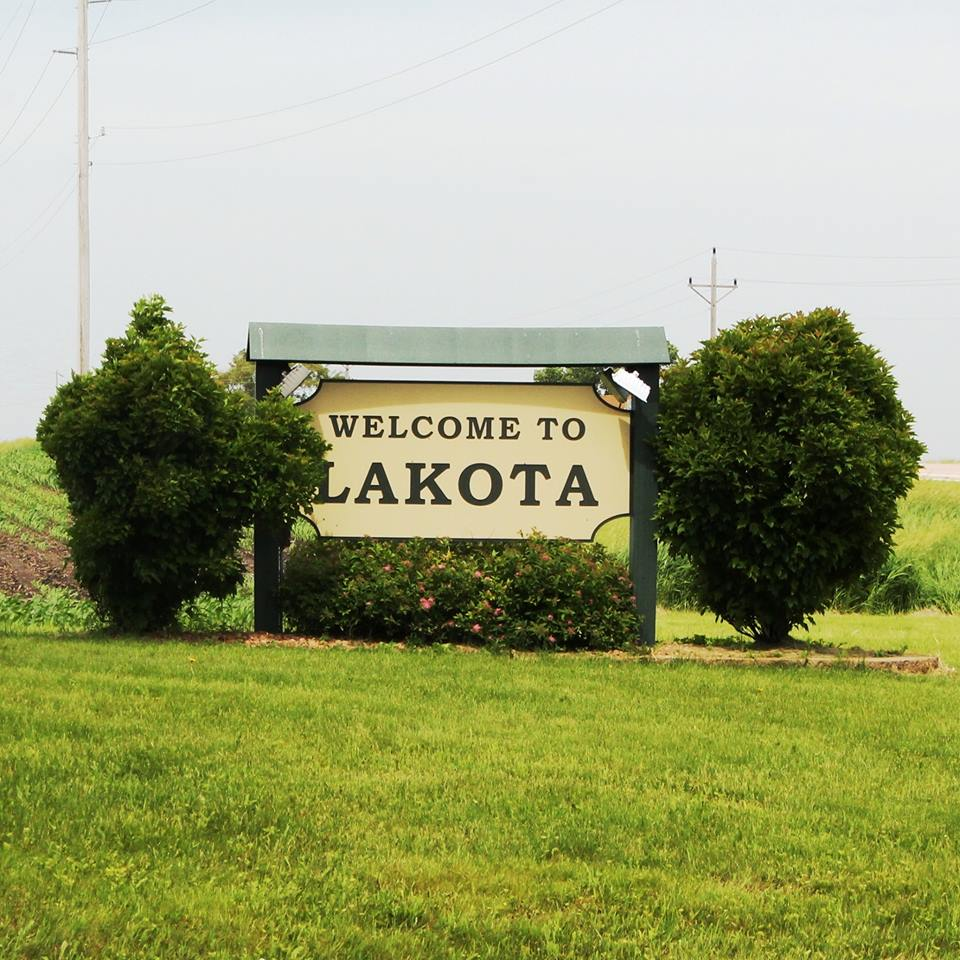
City of Lakota Welcome Sign purchased/installed by the Lakota Community Club.

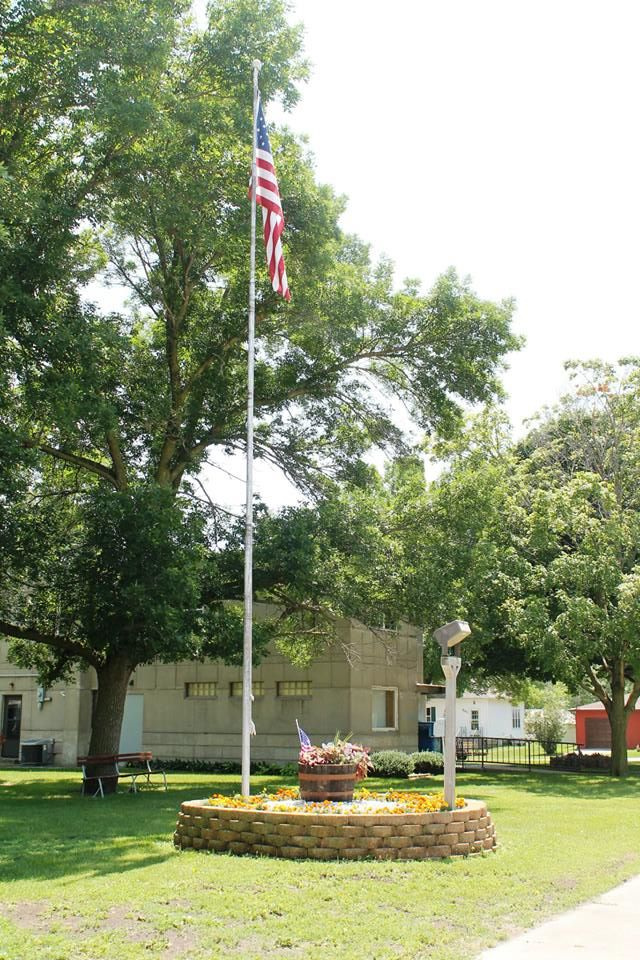
City flag pole garden located in Lakota City Park

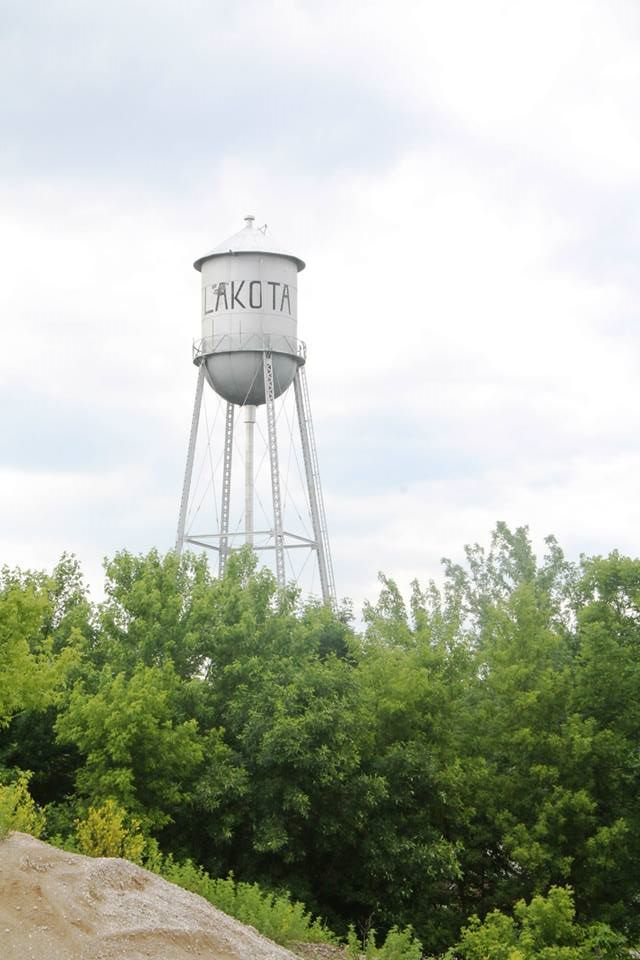
Water tower in Lakota, Iowa

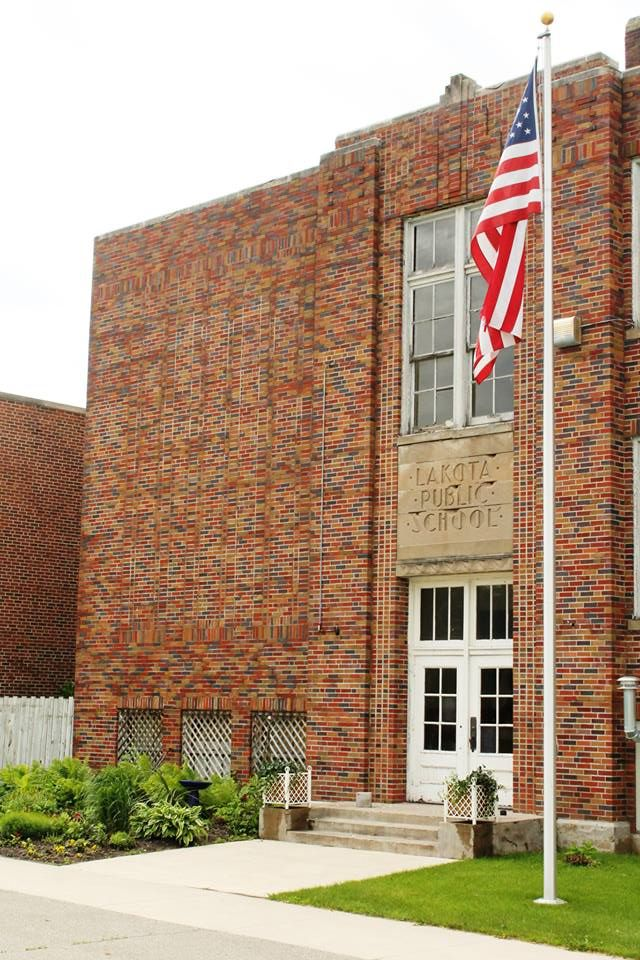
Eagle Center, Lakota, Iowa

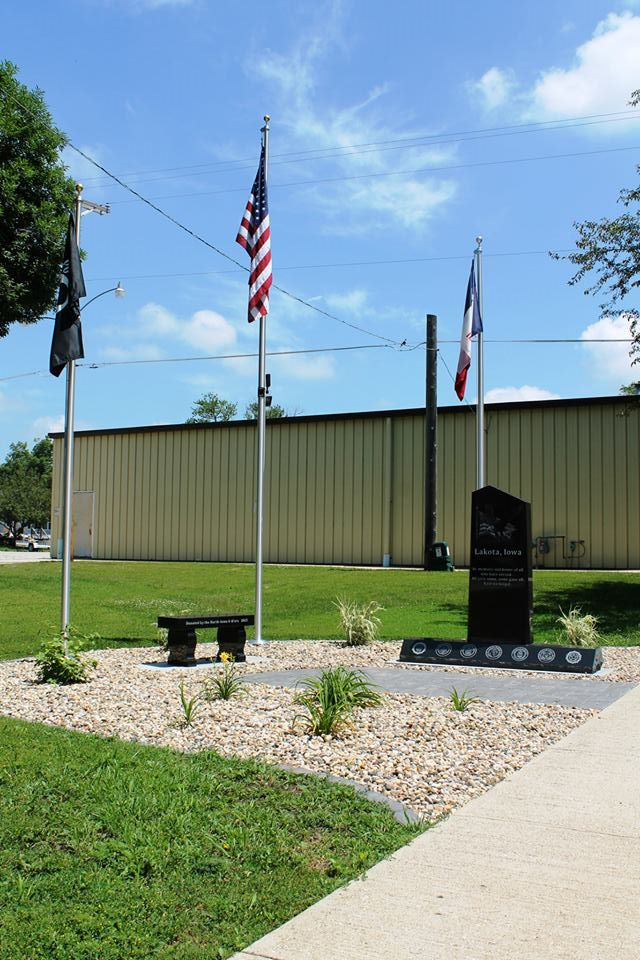
Veterans Memorial
