= Buffalo Center Community School District =

Former school district in Iowa

Buffalo Center Community School District was a school district serving Buffalo Center, Iowa. The district served sections of Kossuth and Winnebago counties. It was formed on July 1, 1954, by the merger of five school districts, each having a one-room school house, with one being in Kossuth County and the remaining ones in Winnebago County. One of the districts was the Buffalo Center Consolidated School District. The merger into the Buffalo Center Community District was approved by a vote held on December 10, 1953. In August 1954 the district board voted to establish a single centralized school for the entire district.

The Buffalo Center district and the Rake Community School District began sharing a superintendent, with the Buffalo Center superintendent taking the role, on July 1, 1975. At the time no other school district in Iowa had made this kind of arrangement. In 1977 the two districts proposed a merger, but the referendum to do so was voted down; the subsequent January 1978 referendum to do so passed. William H. Dreier of the University of Northern Iowa and Ronald Pilgrim, superintendent of Buffalo Center–Rake–Lakota Community School District, wrote that the 1977 vote failed by "a slim margin" but that the Buffalo Center district voters and Rake district voters "overwhelmingly approved" the 1978 referendum. The merger with the Rake district into the Buffalo Center–Rake Community School District took place on July 1, 1978.
