= Thompson Courier and Rake Register =

- Type: Weekly newspaper

The Thompson Courier and Rake Register is a Thursday, weekly, tabloid newspaper serving the towns of Thompson, Iowa and Rake, Iowa in Winnebago County, Iowa. Circulation and advertising fund the costs of providing the services of the Thompson Courier and Rake Register to and for locals and non-locals.

Adobe InDesign is the desktop publishing software used in creating the current issues of the Thompson Courier and Rake Register. Electronic papers of the Thompson Courier and Rake Register as archives and current issues become available online for those interested in obituary, research, and genealogy.

The Thompson Courier and Rake Register is a member of the Iowa Newspaper Association, the National Newspaper Association, and the International Society of Weekly Newspaper Editors.

Tom Theo Klemesrud bought the Courier from Bunge Publishing in 1997 and published it through 2001. He sold the Thompson Courier to Kim Norstrud. Gretchen Daniels bought the Thompson Courier and Rake Register in April 2006.
