= Linden Township =

Linden Township may refer to the following townships in the United States:

- Linden Township, Winnebago County, Iowa
- Linden Township, Brown County, Minnesota
- Linden Township, Union County, New Jersey, see Linden, New Jersey

== See also ==
- Linden Grove Township, St. Louis County, Minnesota
