= Buffalo Township, Winnebago County, Iowa =

Township in Winnebago County, Iowa, U.S.

Coordinates: 43.3860°N 93.9115°W

Buffalo Township is a township in Winnebago County, Iowa, United States.

== History ==
Buffalo Township was established in 1888.
