= St. Ansgar Community School District =

Public school district in St. Ansgar, Iowa, United States

Coordinates: 43.374203°N 92.917124°W

Location
- St. Ansgar, Iowa Mitchell County and Worth County United States
- Coordinates: 43.374203, -92.917124

District information
- Type: Local school district
- Grades: K-12
- Superintendent: Michael Crozier
- Schools: 3
- Budget: $10,484,000 (2020-21)
- NCES District ID: 1925200

Students and staff
- Students: 608 (2022-23)
- Teachers: 43.60 FTE
- Staff: 38.96 FTE
- Student–teacher ratio: 13.94
- Athletic conference: Top of Iowa
- District mascot: Saints
- Colors: Red and White

Other information
- Website: www.st-ansgar.k12.ia.us

St. Ansgar Community School District is a rural public school district headquartered in St. Ansgar, Iowa.

It is mostly in Mitchell County with a portion in Worth County. In addition to St. Ansgar, Grafton, Stacyville, Carpenter, and Mona are within the district borders.

In 2019, it, with the Northwood-Kensett Community School District, began an agreement to share superintendents. The St. Ansgar board approved the agreement in April of that year on a 4-1 basis.

== Schools ==
The district operates three schools, all in a single facility in St. Ansgar:

- St. Ansgar Elementary School
- St. Ansgar Middle School
- St. Ansgar High School

=== St. Ansgar Elementary School ===
The former building closed. A group of students established a theater group as a way of preventing the demolition of the former building.

==== Athletics ====
The Saints participate in the Top of Iowa Conference in the following sports:

- Football
  - 2011 Class 1A State Champions
- Cross Country
- Volleyball
  - 2025 Class 1A State Champions
- Basketball
- Wrestling
- Golf
- Track and Field
  - 2024 Class 1A Girls State Champions
- Baseball
  - 2025 Class 1A State Champions
- Softball

== See also ==
- List of school districts in Iowa
- List of high schools in Iowa
