= Lincoln Township, Winnebago County, Iowa =

Township in Winnebago County, Iowa, U.S.

Coordinates: 43.465°N 93.912°W

Lincoln Township is a township in Winnebago County, Iowa, United States.

== History ==
Lincoln Township was founded about 1889.
