= Center Township, Winnebago County, Iowa =

Township in Winnebago County, Iowa, U.S.

Coordinates: 43.3864°N 93.5574°W

Center Township is a township in Winnebago County, Iowa, United States.

== History ==
Center Township was established in 1864. The city of Lake Mills has grown in the Northeast quadrant of the township.
