= Grafton, Iowa =

- City
- Location of Grafton, Iowa
- Coordinates: 43°19′50″N 93°04′07″W
- Country: USA
- State: Iowa
- County: Worth

Government
  - Type: Mayor
  - Mayor of Grafton: Murray VanQuathem

Area
  - Total: 0.32 sq mi (0.83 km^{2})
  - Land: 0.32 sq mi (0.83 km^{2})
  - Water: 0 sq mi (0.00 km^{2})
- Elevation: 1,227 ft (374 m)

Population (2020)
  - Total: 216
  - Density: 673.5/sq mi (260.05/km^{2})
- Time zone: UTC-6 (Central (CST))
  - Summer (DST): UTC-5 (CDT)
- ZIP code: 50440
- Area code: 641
- FIPS code: 19-31890
- GNIS feature ID: 2394944
- Website: www.graftoniowa.com

Grafton is a city in Worth County, Iowa, United States. The population was 216 in the 2020 census, a decrease of 13.1% from the 290 population in the 2000 census. It is part of the Mason City Micropolitan Statistical Area.

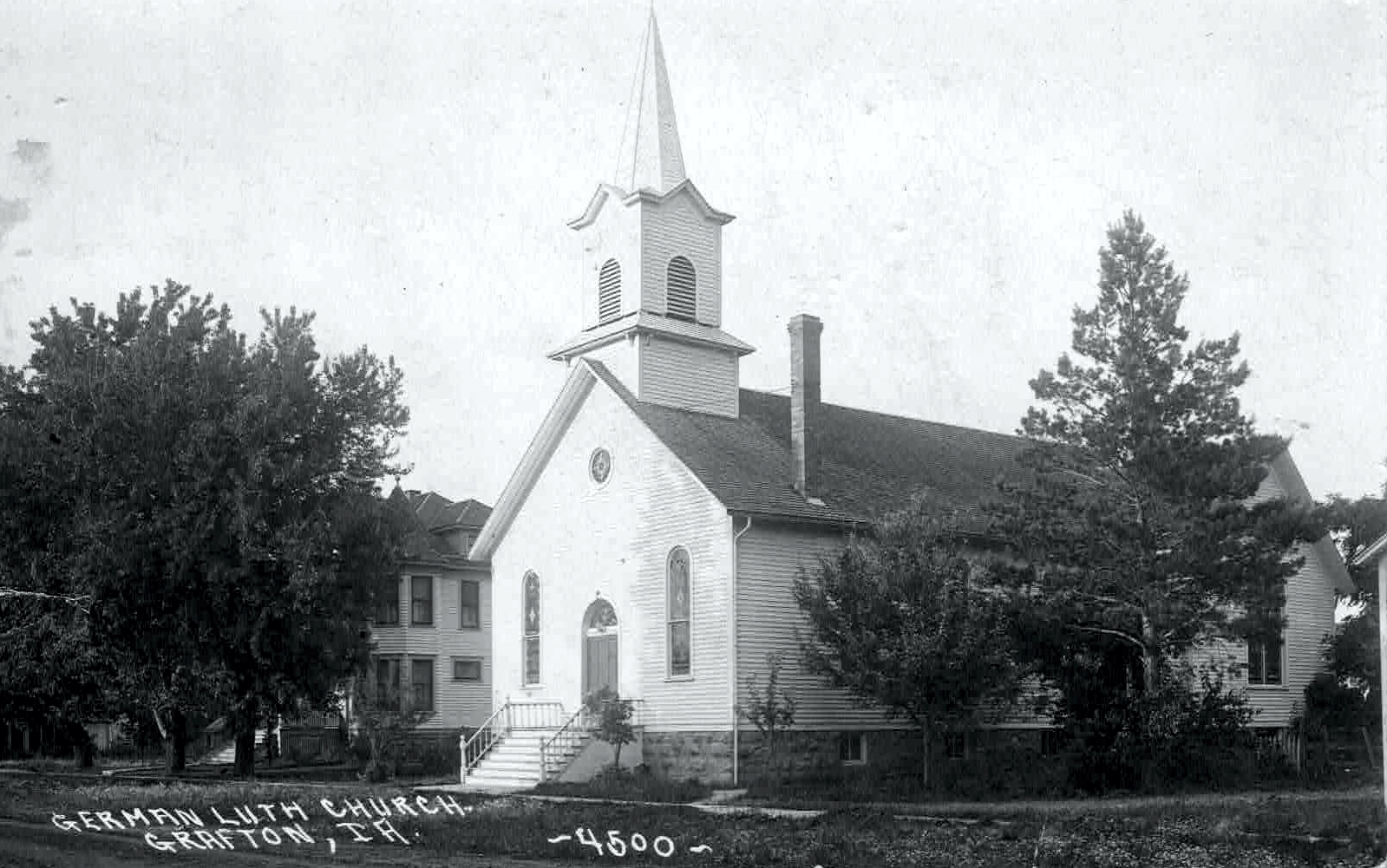
Post card of Lutheran Church in Grafton, IA Circa 1910

== History ==
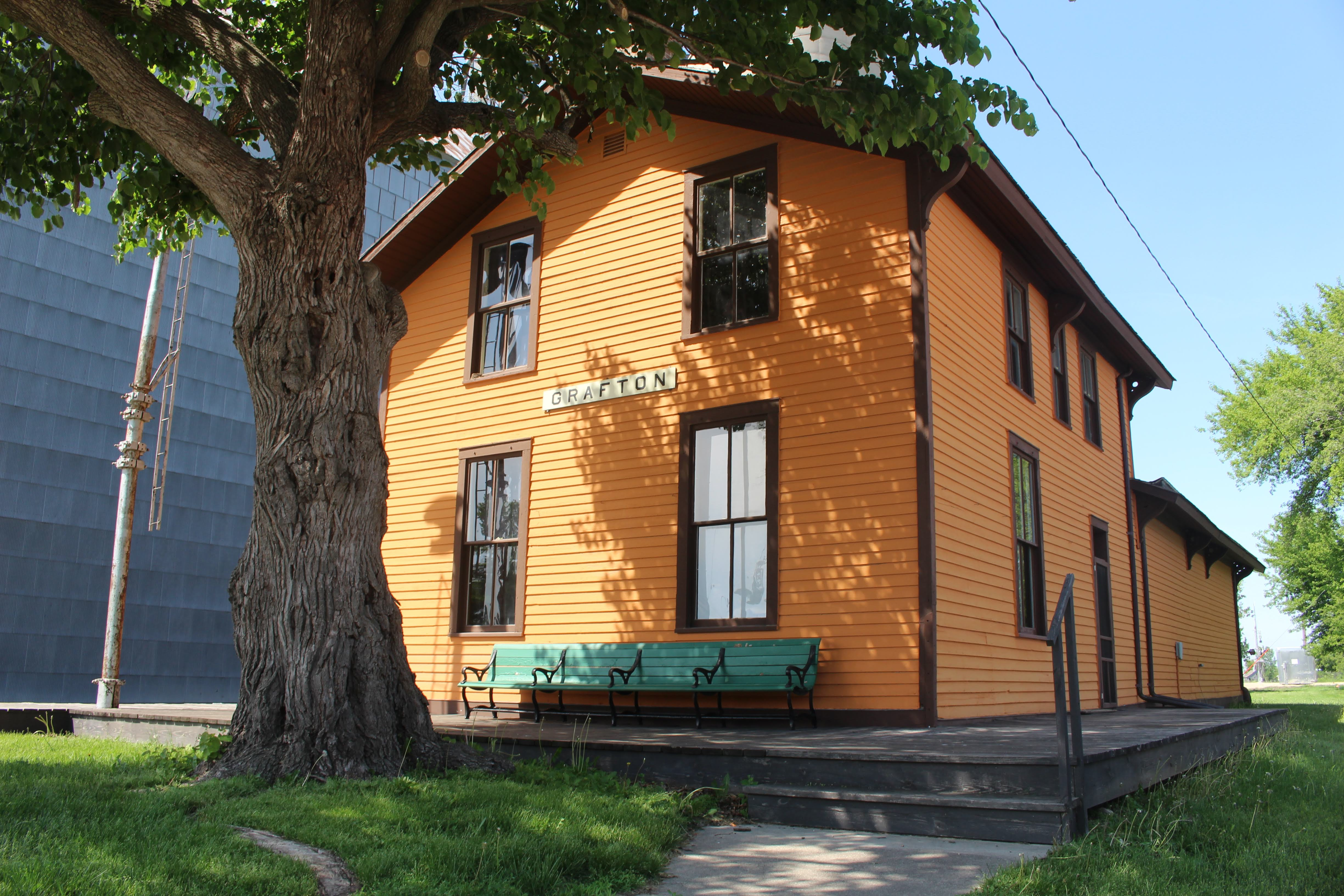
The Grafton Iowa Depot building

Grafton got its start in the year 1878, following construction of the Chicago, Milwaukee and St. Paul Railway through that territory.

== Geography ==
According to the United States Census Bureau, the city has a total area of 0.33 square miles (0.85 km^{2}), all land.

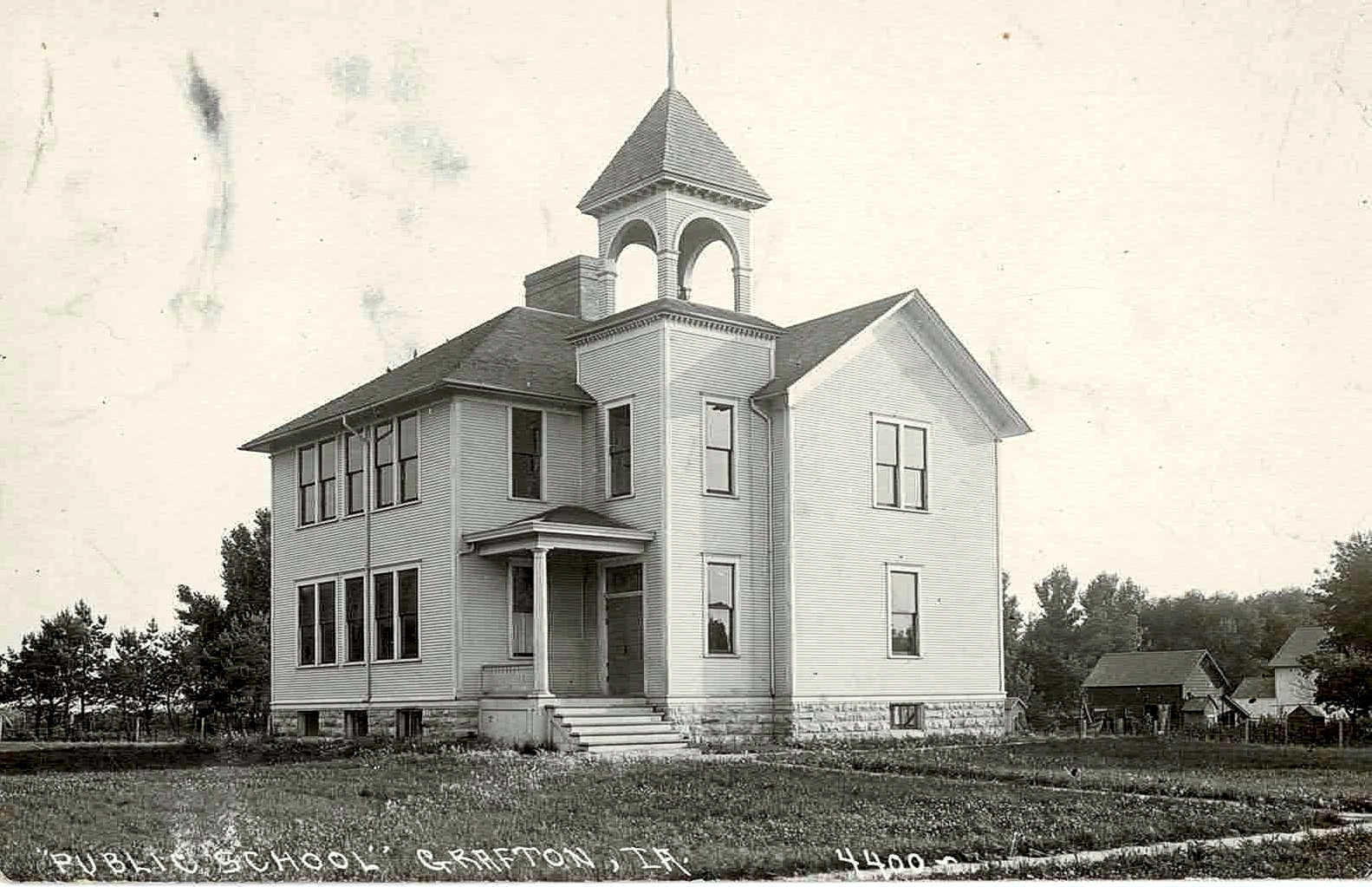
Public School in Grafton, IA pre 1910

== Demographics ==
Historical population
Census	Pop.	Note	%±
1900	156		—
1910	183		17.3%
1920	233		27.3%
1930	249		6.9%
1940	256		2.8%
1950	278		8.6%
1960	273		−1.8%
1970	254		−7.0%
1980	255		0.4%
1990	282		10.6%
2000	290		2.8%
2010	252		−13.1%
2020	216		−14.3%
U.S. Decennial Census

=== 2020 census ===
As of the census of 2020, there were 216 people, 107 households, and 68 families residing in the city. The population density was 673.5 inhabitants per square mile (260.0/km^{2}). There were 118 housing units at an average density of 367.9 per square mile (142.1/km^{2}). The racial makeup of the city was 97.2% White, 0.0% Black or African American, 0.0% Native American, 1.4% Asian, 0.0% Pacific Islander, 0.0% from other races and 1.4% from two or more races. Hispanic or Latino persons of any race comprised 0.9% of the population.

Of the 107 households, 34.6% of which had children under the age of 18 living with them, 44.9% were married couples living together, 13.1% were cohabitating couples, 19.6% had a female householder with no spouse or partner present and 22.4% had a male householder with no spouse or partner present. 36.4% of all households were non-families. 30.8% of all households were made up of individuals, 10.3% had someone living alone who was 65 years old or older.

The median age in the city was 47.5 years. 16.7% of the residents were under the age of 20; 4.6% were between the ages of 20 and 24; 24.1% were from 25 and 44; 33.8% were from 45 and 64; and 20.8% were 65 years of age or older. The gender makeup of the city was 48.6% male and 51.4% female.

=== 2010 census ===
As of the census of 2010, there were 252 people, 114 households, and 70 families residing in the city. The population density was 763.6 inhabitants per square mile (294.8/km^{2}). There were 126 housing units at an average density of 381.8 per square mile (147.4/km^{2}). The racial makeup of the city was 98.8% White, 0.4% Asian, and 0.8% from two or more races.

There were 114 households, of which 26.3% had children under the age of 18 living with them, 52.6% were married couples living together, 6.1% had a female householder with no husband present, 2.6% had a male householder with no wife present, and 38.6% were non-families. 34.2% of all households were made up of individuals, and 15.8% had someone living alone who was 65 years of age or older. The average household size was 2.21 and the average family size was 2.84.

The median age in the city was 43.5 years. 22.2% of residents were under the age of 18; 7.2% were between the ages of 18 and 24; 22.3% were from 25 to 44; 29.7% were from 45 to 64; and 18.7% were 65 years of age or older. The gender makeup of the city was 51.2% male and 48.8% female.

=== 2000 census ===
As of the census of 2000, there were 290 people, 119 households, and 82 families residing in the city. The population density was 895.8 inhabitants per square mile (345.9/km^{2}). There were 132 housing units at an average density of 407.7 per square mile (157.4/km^{2}). The racial makeup of the city was 98.97% White, 0.34% Asian, and 0.69% from two or more races.

There were 119 households, out of which 35.3% had children under the age of 18 living with them, 52.9% were married couples living together, 8.4% had a female householder with no husband present, and 30.3% were non-families. 27.7% of all households were made up of individuals, and 14.3% had someone living alone who was 65 years of age or older. The average household size was 2.44 and the average family size was 2.92.

In the city, the population was spread out, with 29.3% under the age of 18, 5.5% from 18 to 24, 30.7% from 25 to 44, 14.8% from 45 to 64, and 19.7% who were 65 years of age or older. The median age was 37 years. For every 100 females, there were 108.6 males. For every 100 females age 18 and over, there were 107.1 males.

The median income for a household in the city was $28,594, and the median income for a family was $34,063. Males had a median income of $28,906 versus $22,500 for females. The per capita income for the city was $14,201. About 2.4% of families and 5.8% of the population were below the poverty line, including 8.9% of those under the age of eighteen and 6.2% of those 65 or over.

== Education ==
It is within the St. Ansgar Community School District school district.
