= Northwood–Kensett Community School District =

Public school district in Northwood, Iowa, United States

Coordinates: 43.445484°N 93.216165°W

Location
- Northwood, Iowa Worth County United States
- Coordinates: 43.445484, -93.216165

District information
- Type: Local school district
- Grades: K-12
- Superintendent: Michael Crozier
- Schools: 2
- Budget: $9,345,000 (2020-21)
- NCES District ID: 1921210

Students and staff
- Students: 594 (2022-23)
- Teachers: 44.24 FTE
- Staff: 38.71 FTE
- Student–teacher ratio: 13.43
- Athletic conference: Top of Iowa
- District mascot: Vikings
- Colors: Blue and White

Other information
- Website: www.nwood-kensett.k12.ia.us

The Northwood–Kensett Community School District is a rural public school district headquartered in Northwood, Iowa.

The district is completely within Worth County, and serves Northwood, Kensett and the surrounding rural areas.

Michael Crozier became the superintendent of the Northwood-Kensett Community School District in 2013, and suffered a heart attack a week after moving to Northwood. In 2019, the district entered a superintendent sharing agreement with St. Ansgar Community School District, and Mr. Crozier now splits his time between the two districts.

== Governance ==
Northwood–Kensett Community School District follows a council-manager government where five Board of Education members appoint a superintendent to carry out district operations on a day-to-day basis. The current board members are Bradley Christianson (President), Cindy Byrne (Vice-President), Shana Brunsvold, Susan Kliment, and Jamie Nelson. The current superintendent is Tony Hiatt.

== Schools ==
The district operates two schools, in one facility in Northwood:

- Northwood–Kensett Elementary School
- Northwood–Kensett Jr.-Sr. High School

=== Northwood–Kensett High School ===
==== Athletics ====
The Vikings participate in the Top of Iowa Conference in the following sports:

- Football
- Cross Country
- Volleyball
- Basketball
  - Boys' 2007 Class 1A State Champions
- Wrestling
- Golf
- Track and Field
- Baseball
- Softball

== See also ==
- List of school districts in Iowa
- List of high schools in Iowa
