= Newton Township, Winnebago County, Iowa =

Township in Winnebago County, Iowa, U.S.

Coordinates: 43.386°N 93.676°W

Newton Township is a township in Winnebago County, Iowa, United States.

== History ==
Newton Township was founded in 1881. It was likely named for Newton H. Bailey, a pioneer settler.
