= North Iowa Community School District =

Public school district in Buffalo Center, Iowa, United States

Coordinates: 43.388311°N 93.948168°W

Location
- Buffalo Center, Iowa Kossuth and Winnebago counties United States
- Coordinates: 43.388311, -93.948168

District information
- Type: Local school district
- Grades: K-12
- Established: 1996
- Superintendent: Joe Erickson
- Schools: 3
- Budget: $8,092,000 (2020–21)
- NCES District ID: 1905750

Students and staff
- Students: 480 (2022–23)
- Teachers: 39.26 FTE
- Staff: 46.65 FTE
- Student–teacher ratio: 12.23
- Athletic conference: Top of Iowa
- District mascot: Bison
- Colors: Blue and Silver

Other information
- Website: www.northiowa.org

North Iowa Community School District is a rural public school district headquartered in Buffalo Center, Iowa.

The district includes sections of Kossuth and Winnebago counties. It serves Buffalo Center, Lakota, Rake, and Thompson.

It was established on July 1, 1996, by the merger of the Buffalo Center–Rake–Lakota Community School District and the Thompson Community School District.

== Schools ==
The district operates three schools, all in Buffalo Center:

- North Iowa Elementary Buffalo Center
- North Iowa Middle School
- North Iowa High School

=== North Iowa High School ===
==== Athletics ====
The Bison participate in the Top of Iowa Conference in the following sports:

- Football
- Cross Country
- Volleyball
- Basketball
- Bowling
- Wrestling
- Golf
- Track and Field
- Baseball
- Softball

== See also ==
- List of school districts in Iowa
- List of high schools in Iowa
