= Leland, Iowa =

- City
- Location of Leland, Iowa
- Coordinates: 43°20′09″N 93°37′45″W
- Country: US
- State: Iowa
- County: Winnebago

Area
  - Total: 1.37 sq mi (3.54 km^{2})
  - Land: 1.34 sq mi (3.46 km^{2})
  - Water: 0.031 sq mi (0.08 km^{2})
- Elevation: 1,211 ft (369 m)

Population (2020)
  - Total: 249
  - Density: 186.3/sq mi (71.95/km^{2})
- Time zone: UTC-6 (Central (CST))
  - Summer (DST): UTC-5 (CDT)
- ZIP code: 50453
- Area code: 641
- FIPS code: 19-44355
- GNIS feature ID: 2395674

Leland is a city in Winnebago County, Iowa, United States. The population was 249 at the time of the 2020 census.

== History ==
Leland was platted in 1887, and named for one of its founders, John D. Leland. Leland was incorporated as a city in 1894.

== Geography ==
According to the United States Census Bureau, the city has a total area of 1.36 square miles (3.52 km^{2}), of which 1.33 square miles (3.44 km^{2}) is land and 0.03 square miles (0.08 km^{2}) is water.

== Demographics ==
Historical populations
Year	Pop.	±%
1900	215	—
1910	188	−12.6%
1920	180	−4.3%
1930	164	−8.9%
1940	235	+43.3%
1950	209	−11.1%
1960	209	+0.0%
1970	223	+6.7%
1980	274	+22.9%
1990	311	+13.5%
2000	258	−17.0%
2010	289	+12.0%
2020	249	−13.8%
Source:"U.S. Census website". United States Census Bureau. and Iowa Data Center; Source: U.S. Decennial Census

=== 2020 census ===
As of the census of 2020, there were 249 people, 124 households, and 77 families residing in the city. The population density was 186.4 inhabitants per square mile (72.0/km^{2}). There were 129 housing units at an average density of 96.5 per square mile (37.3/km^{2}). The racial makeup of the city was 89.6% White, 1.6% Black or African American, 0.4% Native American, 1.2% Asian, 0.0% Pacific Islander, 0.4% from other races and 6.8% from two or more races. Hispanic or Latino persons of any race comprised 5.2% of the population.

Of the 124 households, 29.0% of which had children under the age of 18 living with them, 45.2% were married couples living together, 8.1% were cohabitating couples, 25.0% had a female householder with no spouse or partner present and 21.8% had a male householder with no spouse or partner present. 37.9% of all households were non-families. 32.3% of all households were made up of individuals, 16.1% had someone living alone who was 65 years old or older.

The median age in the city was 44.8 years. 20.9% of the residents were under the age of 20; 3.6% were between the ages of 20 and 24; 25.7% were from 25 and 44; 29.7% were from 45 and 64; and 20.1% were 65 years of age or older. The gender makeup of the city was 49.8% male and 50.2% female.

=== 2010 census ===
As of the census of 2010, there were 289 people, 119 households, and 76 families residing in the city. The population density was 217.3 inhabitants per square mile (83.9/km^{2}). There were 127 housing units at an average density of 95.5 per square mile (36.9/km^{2}). The racial makeup of the city was 93.4% White, 1.0% African American, 1.0% Native American, 1.4% Asian, 2.4% from other races, and 0.7% from two or more races. Hispanic or Latino of any race were 5.5% of the population.

There were 119 households, of which 31.9% had children under the age of 18 living with them, 48.7% were married couples living together, 6.7% had a female householder with no husband present, 8.4% had a male householder with no wife present, and 36.1% were non-families. 27.7% of all households were made up of individuals, and 6.7% had someone living alone who was 65 years of age or older. The average household size was 2.43 and the average family size was 3.00.

The median age in the city was 40.8 years. 25.6% of residents were under the age of 18; 8.3% were between the ages of 18 and 24; 20.7% were from 25 to 44; 32.6% were from 45 to 64; and 12.8% were 65 years of age or older. The gender makeup of the city was 52.6% male and 47.4% female.

=== 2000 census ===
As of the census of 2000, there were 258 people, 110 households, and 75 families residing in the city. The population density was 168.2 inhabitants per square mile (64.9/km^{2}). There were 117 housing units at an average density of 76.3 per square mile (29.5/km^{2}). The racial makeup of the city was 96.12% White, 0.78% Native American, 1.55% Asian, 0.78% from other races, and 0.78% from two or more races. Hispanic or Latino of any race were 3.49% of the population.

There were 110 households, out of which 34.5% had children under the age of 18 living with them, 53.6% were married couples living together, 11.8% had a female householder with no husband present, and 31.8% were non-families. 25.5% of all households were made up of individuals, and 10.0% had someone living alone who was 65 years of age or older. The average household size was 2.35 and the average family size was 2.83.

In the city, the population was spread out, with 26.4% under the age of 18, 7.8% from 18 to 24, 28.3% from 25 to 44, 26.7% from 45 to 64, and 10.9% who were 65 years of age or older. The median age was 38 years. For every 100 females, there were 85.6 males. For every 100 females age 18 and over, there were 81.0 males.

The median income for a household in the city was $35,000, and the median income for a family was $40,000. Males had a median income of $29,250 versus $21,406 for females. The per capita income for the city was $16,175. About 2.8% of families and 7.2% of the population were below the poverty line, including 11.5% of those under the age of eighteen and 9.1% of those 65 or over.

== Education ==
Residents are part of the Forest City Community School District.

== Popular culture ==
Leland is the subject of a song by Kevin Costner and Modern West.

== Notable person ==
- Terry E. Branstad (born 1946) United States ambassador, formerly the 39th and 42nd governor of Iowa.
