= Thompson, Iowa =

- City
- Motto: A Good Place to Call Home
- Location of Thompson, Iowa
- Coordinates: 43°22′20″N 93°46′30″W
- Country: United States
- State: Iowa
- County: Winnebago

Area
  - Total: 0.86 sq mi (2.22 km^{2})
  - Land: 0.86 sq mi (2.22 km^{2})
  - Water: 0 sq mi (0.00 km^{2})
- Elevation: 1,276 ft (389 m)

Population (2020)
  - Total: 495
  - Density: 577.7/sq mi (223.04/km^{2})
- Time zone: UTC-6 (Central (CST))
  - Summer (DST): UTC-5 (CDT)
- ZIP code: 50478
- Area code: 641
- FIPS code: 19-77745
- GNIS feature ID: 2396050

Thompson is a city in Winnebago County, Iowa, United States. The population was 495 at the time of the 2020 census.

Thompson is home to the Winnebago County Fair, held annually, various agricultural businesses, a public outdoor swimming pool, the Thompson Museum, and Bethany Lutheran Church, built in 1902.

== History ==
Thompson was platted in 1892. It was incorporated as a city in 1894.

A post office opened in 1890, and rural carrier service was established in 1904.

The Thompson Courier began publication in 1894, and is still in business. In 1938, the paper expanded operations with the purchase of the Rake Register, becoming the Thompson Courier and Rake Register.

Thompson's first telephone switchboard was installed in the home of Dr. G.M. Lee in 1894. Groups of farmers joined together to establish their own small phone companies, and 12 systems shared the town's joint switchboard and party lines. By the 1940s, the Switchboard Company had purchased its own building, and the Thompson Telephone Company and Thompson Telephone Cooperative were formed. In 1951, the local Rural Electrification Association released a movie featuring several Thompson residents, who described the struggles for adequate phone service in Winnebago County, until a federal Rural Electrification Administration telephone loan finally enabled the Winnebago Cooperative Telephone Association to provide modern dial service.

The Thompson Cooperative Creamery was chartered in 1897. The creamery consolidated the earlier milk station operations at Amund corner, Vinje, and three other locations, which used large volume separators to skim off cream. Cooling and churning were powered by a steam boiler until electricity was installed.

The Farmers Cooperative Elevator Company formed in 1907, as farmers were dissatisfied with the prices received at the three independent grain elevators.

The Thompson Fire Department built its fire hall in 1925.

Thompson was without a bank for over a year after the First National Bank shut its doors on June 26, 1932, and the State Bank of Thompson and First National Bank of Thompson failed. The Peoples State Bank opened in Thompson on August 1, 1933.

The Thompson Public Library was established in 1937-1938, as a civic improvement project by the Thompson Study Club. The library was located in the Town Hall for 45 years. The library moved into a remodeled section of the fire station in 1983.

In 1938, the Winnebago Rural Electric Cooperative was established. The first section of lines was energized on January 3, 1940.

A large cement grain elevator was built in 1950, and an even larger cement elevator in 1967.

The landmark Chicago, Rock Island and Pacific Railroad depot on Main Street burned to the ground on February 26, 1963. The railroad brought in a small structure which served as its replacement until the line shut down in 1980.

On October 30, 1974, Peoples State Bank was robbed by three unmasked men. An abandoned getaway car was found on a gravel road about six miles from town, but the robbers were never apprehended.

One of the worst fires in Thompson's history occurred on December 22, 1980, and destroyed about half of the Main Street business block, including the Branding Iron Supper Club, which moved into a new building.

In 1983, one of the cement grain elevators ruptured, and was demolished.

During the 2020 Covid pandemic, 79 Thompson area businesses received CARES Act Paycheck Protection Program loans.

== Geography ==
According to the United States Census Bureau, the city has a total area of 0.88 square miles (2.28 km^{2}), all land.

== Demographics ==
Historical populations
Year	Pop.	±%
1900	450	—
1910	500	+11.1%
1920	548	+9.6%
1930	538	−1.8%
1940	664	+23.4%
1950	698	+5.1%
1960	689	−1.3%
1970	600	−12.9%
1980	668	+11.3%
1990	498	−25.4%
2000	596	+19.7%
2010	502	−15.8%
2020	495	−1.4%
Source:"U.S. Census website". United States Census Bureau. and Iowa Data Center; Source: U.S. Decennial Census

=== 2020 census ===
As of the census of 2020, there were 495 people, 247 households, and 124 families residing in the city. The population density was 577.7 inhabitants per square mile (223.0/km^{2}). There were 277 housing units at an average density of 323.3 per square mile (124.8/km^{2}). The racial makeup of the city was 92.3% White, 1.0% Black or African American, 0.0% Native American, 1.0% Asian, 0.0% Pacific Islander, 3.6% from other races and 2.0% from two or more races. Hispanic or Latino persons of any race comprised 5.9% of the population.

Of the 247 households, 20.2% of which had children under the age of 18 living with them, 37.2% were married couples living together, 7.7% were cohabitating couples, 24.7% had a female householder with no spouse or partner present and 30.4% had a male householder with no spouse or partner present. 49.8% of all households were non-families. 44.1% of all households were made up of individuals, 18.6% had someone living alone who was 65 years old or older.

The median age in the city was 47.4 years. 20.2% of the residents were under the age of 20; 3.4% were between the ages of 20 and 24; 23.2% were from 25 and 44; 28.9% were from 45 and 64; and 24.2% were 65 years of age or older. The gender makeup of the city was 51.5% male and 48.5% female.

=== 2010 census ===
As of the census of 2010, there were 502 people, 236 households, and 141 families residing in the city. The population density was 570.5 inhabitants per square mile (220.3/km^{2}). There were 285 housing units at an average density of 323.9 per square mile (125.1/km^{2}). The racial makeup of the city was 97.6% White, 1.0% Asian, 0.8% from other races, and 0.6% from two or more races. Hispanic or Latino of any race were 1.0% of the population.

There were 236 households, of which 23.3% had children under the age of 18 living with them, 45.3% were married couples living together, 8.9% had a female householder with no husband present, 5.5% had a male householder with no wife present, and 40.3% were non-families. 35.6% of all households were made up of individuals, and 14.8% had someone living alone who was 65 years of age or older. The average household size was 2.13 and the average family size was 2.67.

The median age in the city was 44 years. 21.3% of residents were under the age of 18; 6.1% were between the ages of 18 and 24; 25.2% were from 25 to 44; 29.4% were from 45 to 64; and 18.3% were 65 years of age or older. The gender makeup of the city was 49.8% male and 50.2% female.

=== 2000 census ===
As of the census of 2000, there were 596 people, 261 households, and 169 families residing in the city. The population density was 681.3 inhabitants per square mile (263.1/km^{2}). There were 278 housing units at an average density of 317.8 per square mile (122.7/km^{2}). The racial makeup of the city was 97.65% White, 0.34% Native American, 0.50% Asian, 0.67% from other races, and 0.84% from two or more races. Hispanic or Latino of any race were 1.51% of the population.

There were 261 households, out of which 28.4% had children under the age of 18 living with them, 50.6% were married couples living together, 11.5% had a female householder with no husband present, and 35.2% were non-families. 30.7% of all households were made up of individuals, and 16.5% had someone living alone who was 65 years of age or older. The average household size was 2.28 and the average family size was 2.76.

23.5% were under the age of 18, 9.9% from 18 to 24, 25.7% from 25 to 44, 20.1% from 45 to 64, and 20.8% were 65 years of age or older. The median age was 38 years. For every 100 females, there were 89.8 males. For every 100 females age 18 and over, there were 90.0 males.

The median income for a household in the city was $32,868, and the median income for a family was $39,688. Males had a median income of $27,727 versus $21,630 for females. The per capita income for the city was $18,919. About 8.4% of families and 9.6% of the population were below the poverty line, including 16.2% of those under age 18 and 2.9% of those age 65 or over.

== Education ==
The independent school district of Thompson was incorporated in 1894. Thompson High School graduated its first class in 1900, and its last class in 1989. Thompson's horse drawn school bus was replaced by a motorized school bus in 1909.

Thompson is now within the North Iowa Community School District, which was established on July 1, 1996, by the merger of the Buffalo Center–Rake–Lakota Community School District and the Thompson Community School District. There was a Buffalo Center School District that merged with the Rake School District to form the Buffalo Center-Rake district on July 1, 1978. On July 1, 1992, that district merged with the Lakota School District to form the Buffalo Center–Rake–Lakota district, and that district merged into North Iowa in 1996.

== Agriculture business ==
Linden Hill, a small CSA (community sponsored agriculture) farm and farm stand, produces vegetables, honey and herbs.

In 2021, Ovation Farms, a former Rembrandt Foods farm, was acquired by Iowa Cage-Free, part of the Versova family of companies. The 240-acre farm "houses one million cage-free hens and pullets", a feed mill, and an egg processing plant.

Horswell Potato Farms, established in 1953, sold potatoes to Midwestern chain stores. It was one of the first farms to wash its potatoes and package them in consumer sized bags. The farm also grew sugar beets. The operation was sold in 1968.

Between 1979 and 2019, 223 recipients in the Thompson zipcode, 50478, received a total of $37,500,717 in farm subsidy payments.

== Notable people ==
- Clifford Branstad, politician
- Judy Klemesrud, journalist
