= Rake Community School District =

Defunct school district in Iowa, US

Rake Community School District was a school district serving Rake, Iowa, and the surrounding rural area in northwestern Winnebago, and northeastern Kossuth County. For many years, into the 1970s, Rake Community School had been one of the smallest school districts in the state of Iowa, typically having fewer than 200 students in grades kindergarten through twelfth grade. Rake High School's 1975 graduating class, for example, had only 13 members, with just eight students in the second grade.

On July 1, 1975, the Rake School District and the nearby Buffalo Center Community School District, located 6 miles (9.7 km) to the south, in Buffalo Center, a town of 1200, began sharing a Superintendent of Schools; Buffalo Center's then-superintendent assuming the role. At the time, no other school districts in Iowa had made this kind of arrangement. In 1977, the two districts proposed a consolidation and merger, but the referendum failed to pass; under Iowa law, voters in each district would have to approve the merger by a simple majority. The two districts tried again in January, 1978; this time, voters in both districts approved the merger. In a 1995 report, co-authored by William H. Dreier of the University of Northern Iowa and Ronald Pilgrim, superintendent of the then-Buffalo Center–Rake–Lakota Community School District, the 1977 vote failed by "a slim margin" in Rake, though voters in Buffalo Center had approved it - but that the voters in both Buffalo Center and Rake had "overwhelmingly approved" the 1978 referendum. With the approval of the merger agreement in both districts, the two formerly separate school systems officially became one, on July 1, 1978, becoming the Buffalo Center–Rake Community School District.
