= Norway Township, Winnebago County, Iowa =

Township in Winnebago County, Iowa, U.S.

Coordinates: 43.465°N 93.557°W

Norway Township is a township in Winnebago County, Iowa, United States.

== History ==
Norway Township was founded in 1864. It is referred to as Iowa Township in the 1870 United States Census. It was originally settled chiefly by Norwegians, hence the name.
