= Scarville, Iowa =

- City
- Location of Scarville, Iowa
- Coordinates: 43°28′14″N 93°36′55″W
- Country: USA
- State: Iowa
- County: Winnebago

Area
  - Total: 0.14 sq mi (0.37 km^{2})
  - Land: 0.14 sq mi (0.37 km^{2})
  - Water: 0 sq mi (0.00 km^{2})
- Elevation: 1,250 ft (380 m)

Population (2020)
  - Total: 74
  - Density: 518.2/sq mi (200.07/km^{2})
- Time zone: UTC-6 (Central (CST))
  - Summer (DST): UTC-5 (CDT)
- ZIP code: 50473
- Area code: 641
- FIPS code: 19-71040
- GNIS feature ID: 2396551

Scarville is a city in Winnebago County, Iowa, United States. The population was 74 at the time of the 2020 census.

== History ==
Scarville was platted in 1899, and incorporated as a city in 1904. The city was named for Ole Scar, a local landowner.

== Geography ==
According to the United States Census Bureau, the city has a total area of 0.08 square miles (0.21 km^{2}), all land.

== Demographics ==
Historical populations
Year	Pop.	±%
1910	129	—
1920	140	+8.5%
1930	163	+16.4%
1940	136	−16.6%
1950	105	−22.8%
1960	105	+0.0%
1970	81	−22.9%
1980	82	+1.2%
1990	92	+12.2%
2000	97	+5.4%
2010	72	−25.8%
2020	74	+2.8%
Source:"U.S. Census website". United States Census Bureau. and Iowa Data Center; Source: U.S. Decennial Census

=== 2020 census ===
As of the census of 2020, there were 74 people, 38 households, and 25 families residing in the city. The population density was 518.2 inhabitants per square mile (200.1/km^{2}). There were 39 housing units at an average density of 273.1 per square mile (105.4/km^{2}). The racial makeup of the city was 97.3% White, 0.0% Black or African American, 0.0% Native American, 0.0% Asian, 0.0% Pacific Islander, 2.7% from other races and 0.0% from two or more races. Hispanic or Latino persons of any race comprised 13.5% of the population.

Of the 38 households, 39.5% of which had children under the age of 18 living with them, 28.9% were married couples living together, 10.5% were cohabitating couples, 31.6% had a female householder with no spouse or partner present and 28.9% had a male householder with no spouse or partner present. 34.2% of all households were non-families. 26.3% of all households were made up of individuals, 10.5% had someone living alone who was 65 years old or older.

The median age in the city was 47.5 years. 21.6% of the residents were under the age of 20; 6.8% were between the ages of 20 and 24; 20.3% were from 25 and 44; 33.8% were from 45 and 64; and 17.6% were 65 years of age or older. The gender makeup of the city was 50.0% male and 50.0% female.

=== 2010 census ===
As of the census of 2010, there were 72 people, 36 households, and 18 families living in the city. The population density was 900.0 inhabitants per square mile (347.5/km^{2}). There were 40 housing units at an average density of 500.0 per square mile (193.1/km^{2}). The racial makeup of the city was 97.2% White, 1.4% Native American, and 1.4% Asian.

There were 36 households, of which 30.6% had children under the age of 18 living with them, 38.9% were married couples living together, 5.6% had a female householder with no husband present, 5.6% had a male householder with no wife present, and 50.0% were non-families. 47.2% of all households were made up of individuals, and 25% had someone living alone who was 65 years of age or older. The average household size was 2.00 and the average family size was 2.94.

The median age in the city was 41 years. 23.6% of residents were under the age of 18; 5.6% were between the ages of 18 and 24; 25% were from 25 to 44; 25.1% were from 45 to 64; and 20.8% were 65 years of age or older. The gender makeup of the city was 41.7% male and 58.3% female.

=== 2000 census ===
At the 2000 census, there were 97 people, 41 households and 25 families living in the city. The population density was 997.4 inhabitants per square mile (385.1/km^{2}). There were 42 housing units at an average density of 431.8 per square mile (166.7/km^{2}). The racial makeup of the city was 95.88% White and 4.12% Native American.

There were 41 households, of which 34.1% had children under the age of 18 living with them, 48.8% were married couples living together, 7.3% had a female householder with no husband present, and 36.6% were non-families. 34.1% of all households were made up of individuals, and 9.8% had someone living alone who was 65 years of age or older. The average household size was 2.37 and the average family size was 2.92.

32.0% of the population were under the age of 18, 4.1% from 18 to 24, 24.7% from 25 to 44, 23.7% from 45 to 64, and 15.5% who were 65 years of age or older. The median age was 36 years. For every 100 females, there were 90.2 males. For every 100 females age 18 and over, there were 100.0 males.

The median household income was $40,139 and the median family income was $38,750. Males had a median income of $30,000 versus $21,500 for females. The per capita income for the city was $18,949. There were 6.3% of families and 6.9% of the population living below the poverty line, including 6.7% of under eighteens and none of those over 64.

== Education ==
The Lake Mills Community School District operates local public schools.

Scarville Lutheran School is a Christian elementary school of the Evangelical Lutheran Synod in Scarville.
