= Titonka Consolidated School District =

Defunct school district in Iowa, United States

Titonka Consolidated School District was a school district headquartered in Titonka, Iowa, United States.

Most of the district was in Kossuth County, while sections were in Hancock and Winnebago counties.

== History ==
For much of its history the district operated elementary and middle school levels.

In 1989, Titonka began a program of sharing academic, athletic, and extracurricular activities with the Buffalo Center–Rake Community School District. On July 1, 1989, Titonka entered into a grade-sharing arrangement with the Buffalo-Rake, Lakota, and Thompson school districts, in which students from any one or two districts attended the other districts' schools for a particular grade level. Earlier that year those districts and the Woden–Crystal Lake Community School District held discussions about a comprehensive plan for their region. In 1992, the Buffalo Center–Rake and Lakota districts merged into the Buffalo Center–Rake–Lakota district. The grade-sharing arrangement with the new district was renewed for three years. While the successor district and Thompson attempted a merge, the Titonka district did not attempt a merger with them.

In 1995, the grade-sharing agreement with Buffalo Center–Rake–Lakota and Thompson expired, and instead Titonka began grade-sharing with Woden–Crystal Lake. The district sent its students to Woden–Crystal Lake for senior high school, while Titonka operated the joint junior high school, and both districts had their respective elementary schools. As a result of the agreement, schools were branded "Woden–Crystal Lake–Titonka Community School District" even though the two districts remained legally separate. In 2002 the Titonka K–8 school had about 200–225 students.

In 2007, the middle school section was renovated and an addition was installed.

In 2011, Titonka switched its high school grade-sharing to the Algona Community School District. Its grade-sharing agreement with the Algona district meant that Titonka would send students in grades 5–12 to Algona, and so the Titonka district became elementary only. In 2013, the residents of the Titonka district voted to consolidate their district altogether into the Algona district. The whole grade-sharing agreement was modified for 2013–14, the final school year, so that the Algona district only taught preschool and preschool preparation classes. On July 1, 2014, the Titonka district consolidated into the Algona district. The Algona district, which took control of the school building, was scheduled to sell it to the Titonka city government on January 12, 2015.
