= Eden Township, Winnebago County, Iowa =

Eden Township
- Township
- Location within Iowa Location within the United States
- Coordinates: 43.46474°N 93.79313°W
- Country: United States
- State: Iowa
- County: Winnebago
- Founded: 1886

Eden Township is a township in Winnebago County, Iowa, United States.

== History ==
Eden Township was founded in 1886.

Eden's first schools were built in 1886-1887. Eden No. 1, called the Iverson school, was constructed in 1886. The old wooden building burned in 1918, and was replaced. It closed in 1955. Eden No. 2, the Lund school, was built in 1877, and was for a time the only school in the township. It was moved closer to the center of the district, on Flo land, and was called the Flo school. Norwegian school and religious school were also taught here. It closed in 1854. Eden No. 3, built in 1888, was known as the Erdahl school. It was moved closer to the center of the district in 1897, and ended up in Section 17 because the mud was too deep to move the school any farther. Eden No. 4, built in 1901, was known as the Granzow school. Its largest attendance was in 1912, with 34 pupils. It closed in 1954. Eden no. 4, the Vardal school, was built in 1896, and named after M. Varland, the first settler in the district. It closed in 1955. Eden no. 6 was originally located in the Christian home, and in an old house. A frame building with a cement foundation was built in 1888. The school closed in 1947.
