= Logan Township, Winnebago County, Iowa =

Township in Winnebago County, Iowa, U.S.

Coordinates: 43.465°N 93.676°W

Logan Township is a township in Winnebago County, Iowa, United States.

== History ==
Logan Township was founded in 1881.
