= Lake Mills, Iowa =

- City
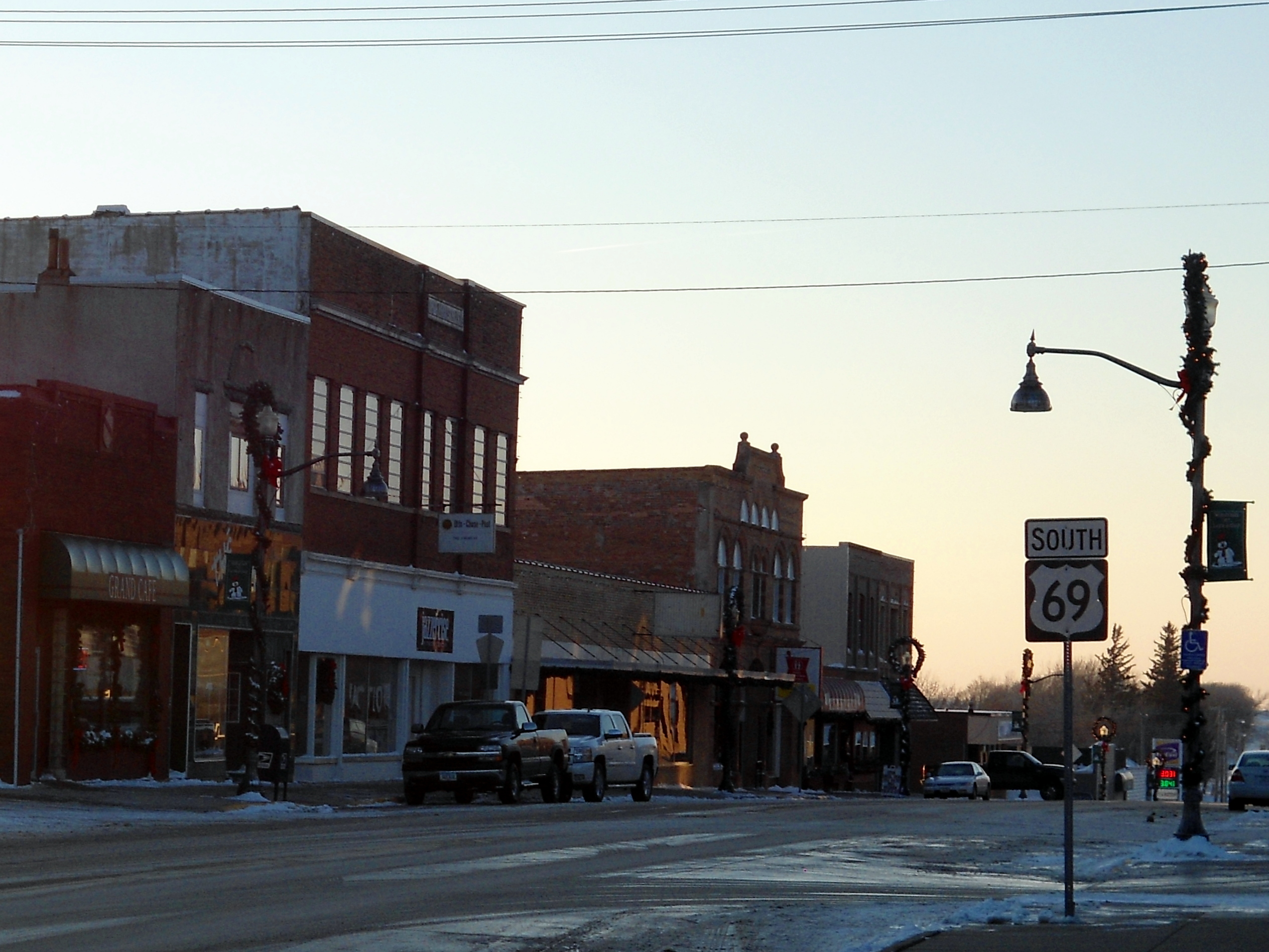
- Main Street in Lake Mills

- Location of Lake Mills, Iowa
- Coordinates: 43°25′01″N 93°31′53″W
- Country: USA
- State: Iowa
- County: Winnebago

Area
  - Total: 2.74 sq mi (7.10 km^{2})
  - Land: 2.71 sq mi (7.03 km^{2})
  - Water: 0.027 sq mi (0.07 km^{2})
- Elevation: 1,289 ft (393 m)

Population (2020)
  - Total: 2,143
  - Density: 789.6/sq mi (304.86/km^{2})
- Time zone: UTC-6 (Central (CST))
  - Summer (DST): UTC-5 (CDT)
- ZIP code: 50450
- Area code: 641
- FIPS code: 19-42555
- GNIS feature ID: 2395595
- Website: www.lakemillsia.org

Lake Mills is a city in Winnebago County, Iowa, United States. The population was 2,143 at the time of the 2020 census.

== History ==
Lake Mills was platted in part of the northeast quadrant of Center Township in 1869. A gristmill had been built at the site in 1864. Lake Mills was incorporated as a city in 1880.

== Geography ==
According to the United States Census Bureau, the city has a total area of 2.73 square miles (7.07 km^{2}), of which 2.70 square miles (6.99 km^{2}) is land and 0.03 square miles (0.08 km^{2}) is water.

== Demographics ==
Historical populations
Year	Pop.	±%
1880	414	—
1890	604	+45.9%
1900	1,293	+114.1%
1910	1,214	−6.1%
1920	1,529	+25.9%
1930	1,474	−3.6%
1940	1,677	+13.8%
1950	1,560	−7.0%
1960	1,758	+12.7%
1970	2,124	+20.8%
1980	2,281	+7.4%
1990	2,143	−6.0%
2000	2,140	−0.1%
2010	2,100	−1.9%
2020	2,143	+2.0%
Source:"U.S. Census website". United States Census Bureau. and Iowa Data Center; Source: U.S. Decennial Census

=== 2020 census ===
As of the 2020 census, Lake Mills had a population of 2,143, with 965 households and 539 families residing in the city. The population density was 789.6 inhabitants per square mile (304.9/km^{2}). There were 1,051 housing units at an average density of 387.2 per square mile (149.5/km^{2}).

Of the 965 households, 24.2% had children under the age of 18 living with them. Of all households, 42.0% were married-couple households, 6.3% were cohabitating couples, 30.7% had a female householder with no spouse or partner present, and 21.0% had a male householder with no spouse or partner present. About 44.1% of households were non-families, 38.9% were made up of individuals, and 19.7% had someone living alone who was 65 years of age or older.

The median age was 43.6 years. 23.8% of residents were under the age of 20, 4.6% were between the ages of 20 and 24, 22.6% were from 25 to 44, 23.6% were from 45 to 64, and 25.4% were 65 years of age or older. In total, 21.7% of residents were under the age of 18. The gender makeup of the city was 47.2% male and 52.8% female. For every 100 females there were 89.3 males, and for every 100 females age 18 and over there were 90.0 males age 18 and over.

0.0% of residents lived in urban areas, while 100.0% lived in rural areas. Of the 1,051 housing units, 8.2% were vacant. The homeowner vacancy rate was 3.0% and the rental vacancy rate was 7.8%.

Racial composition as of the 2020 census
Race	Number	Percent
White	1,944	90.7%
Black or African American	20	0.9%
American Indian and Alaska Native	3	0.1%
Asian	8	0.4%
Native Hawaiian and Other Pacific Islander	0	0.0%
Some other race	88	4.1%
Two or more races	80	3.7%
Hispanic or Latino (of any race)	180	8.4%

=== 2010 census ===
As of the census of 2010, there were 2,100 people, 944 households, and 552 families living in the city. The population density was 777.8 inhabitants per square mile (300.3/km^{2}). There were 1,055 housing units at an average density of 390.7 per square mile (150.9/km^{2}). The racial makeup of the city was 96.7% White, 0.3% African American, 1.0% Asian, 1.1% from other races, and 0.8% from two or more races. Hispanic or Latino of any race were 3.6% of the population.

There were 944 households, of which 26.2% had children under the age of 18 living with them, 44.5% were married couples living together, 9.6% had a female householder with no husband present, 4.3% had a male householder with no wife present, and 41.5% were non-families. 37.1% of all households were made up of individuals, and 18.5% had someone living alone who was 65 years of age or older. The average household size was 2.16 and the average family size was 2.80.

The median age in the city was 45.3 years. 22.3% of residents were under the age of 18; 6.2% were between the ages of 18 and 24; 21.1% were from 25 to 44; 26.6% were from 45 to 64; and 23.7% were 65 years of age or older. The gender makeup of the city was 47.9% male and 52.1% female.

=== 2000 census ===
As of the census of 2000, there were 2,140 people, 957 households, and 580 families living in the city. The population density was 821.6 inhabitants per square mile (317.2/km^{2}). There were 1,010 housing units at an average density of 387.8 per square mile (149.7/km^{2}). The racial makeup of the city was 98.36% White, 0.05% African American, 0.14% Native American, 0.65% Asian, 0.37% from other races, and 0.42% from two or more races. Hispanic or Latino of any race were 1.64% of the population.

There were 957 households, out of which 27.1% had children under the age of 18 living with them, 48.3% were married couples living together, 8.9% had a female householder with no husband present, and 39.3% were non-families. 36.6% of all households were made up of individuals, and 18.2% had someone living alone who was 65 years of age or older. The average household size was 2.15 and the average family size was 2.78.

21.9% were under the age of 18, 7.7% from 18 to 24, 24.0% from 25 to 44, 23.1% from 45 to 64, and 23.4% were 65 years of age or older. The median age was 43 years. For every 100 females, there were 82.1 males. For every 100 females age 18 and over, there were 80.5 males.

The median income for a household in the city was $33,723, and the median income for a family was $50,345. Males had a median income of $31,898 versus $25,094 for females. The per capita income for the city was $19,155. About 6.0% of families and 8.9% of the population were below the poverty line, including 14.7% of those under age 18 and 5.8% of those age 65 or over.

== Education ==
The Lake Mills Community School District operates local public schools.

== Notable people ==
- Terry Branstad (born 1946), Governor of Iowa
- Selmer Jackson (1888 – 1971), American stage, film, and television actor
- Cody Nickson (born 1985), Marine/Air Force Veteran, Big Brother contestant
- Wallace Stegner (1909–1993), historian, writer, Pulitzer Prize winner in 1971
- Mike Stensrud (1956-2024), NFL player 1979–1989
