= Lake Mills Community School District =

Public school district in Lake Mills, Iowa, United States

Coordinates: 43.415314°N 93.531528°W

Location
- Lake Mills, Iowa Winnebago and Worth counties United States
- Coordinates: 43.415314, -93.531528

District information
- Type: Local school district
- Grades: K-12
- Superintendent: Chris Rogne
- Schools: 3
- Budget: $10,564,000 (2020-21)
- NCES District ID: 1916110

Students and staff
- Students: 671 (2022-23)
- Teachers: 50.20 FTE
- Staff: 53.53 FTE
- Student–teacher ratio: 13.37
- Athletic conference: Top of Iowa
- District mascot: Bulldogs
- Colors: Purple and Gold

Other information
- Website: www.lake-mills.k12.ia.us

The Lake Mills Community School District is a rural public school district headquartered in Lake Mills, Iowa.

The district occupies sections of Winnebago and Worth counties, and in addition to Lake Mills, it includes Joice, Scarville, and the surrounding rural areas.

In 2015, Chad Kohagen became the superintendent of the Lake Mills district.

== Schools ==
The district operates three schools, all in Lake Mills:

- Lake Mills Elementary School
- Lake Mills Middle School
- Lake Mills Senior High School

=== Lake Mills Senior High School ===
==== Athletics ====
The Bulldogs participate in the Top of Iowa Conference in the following sports:

- Football
- Cross Country
  - Boys' 2023 and 2024 Class 1A State Champions
- Volleyball
- Basketball
- Wrestling
  - 2000 Class 1A State Champions
- Golf
  - Boys' 2022 Class 1A State Champions
- Track and Field
- Baseball
- Softball

== See also ==
- List of school districts in Iowa
- List of high schools in Iowa
