= Mount Valley Township, Winnebago County, Iowa =

Township in Winnebago County, Iowa, U.S.

Coordinates: 43.299°N 93.557°W

Mount Valley Township is a township in Winnebago County, Iowa, United States.

== History ==
Mount Valley Township was founded in 1879. It was likely named from the mounds and valleys covering its uneven terrain.
