= Grant Township, Winnebago County, Iowa =

Township in Winnebago County, Iowa, U.S.

Coordinates: 43.2986°N 93.9114°W

Grant Township is a township in Winnebago County, Iowa, United States.

== History ==
Grant Township was established in 1886. It was named for Ulysses S. Grant.
