= Buffalo Center–Rake Community School District =

Former school district in Iowa

Buffalo Center–Rake Community School District was a school district serving Buffalo Center and Rake, Iowa.

The district was established on July 1, 1978, with the merger of the Buffalo Center Community School District and the Rake Community School District.

In fall 1987, the Buffalo Center–Rake district and the Lakota Consolidated School entered into a grade-sharing arrangement in which students from both districts attended the Buffalo Center–Rake secondary school, and which had the same principal for the elementary level. The arrangement was approved the prior January 12. Each district still had its own superintendent.

In 1989, the Titonka Consolidated School District began a program of sharing academic, athletic, and extracurricular activities with Buffalo Center–Rake. On July 1, 1989, Buffalo Center–Rake entered into a grade-sharing arrangement with the Lakota, Thompson and Titonka school districts. Earlier that year those districts and the Woden–Crystal Lake Community School District held discussions about a comprehensive plan for their region.

On July 1, 1992, the Buffalo Center–Rake and Lakota districts merged into the Buffalo Center–Rake–Lakota Community School District. The grade-sharing arrangement continued with the new district until 1995.
