= Forest Township, Winnebago County, Iowa =

Township in Winnebago County, Iowa

Coordinates: 43.299°N 93.675°W

Forest Township is a township in Winnebago County, Iowa, United States.

== History ==
Forest Township was founded in 1857.
