= Thompson Community School District =

Defunct school district in Iowa, United States

Thompson Community School District was a school district serving Thompson, Iowa.

The independent school district of Thompson was incorporated in 1894. Thompson High School graduated its first class in 1900, and its last class in 1989. A horse drawn school bus was replaced by a motorized school bus in 1909.

On July 1, 1989, Thompson entered into a whole grade-sharing arrangement with the Buffalo Center–Rake, Lakota and the Titonka school districts; earlier that year those districts, plus the neighboring Woden–Crystal Lake Community School District, held discussions about a comprehensive plan for their region. In 1992, the Buffalo Center–Rake and Lakota districts merged into the Buffalo Center–Rake–Lakota district. The whole grade-sharing relationship continued among Buffalo Center-Rake, Thompson, and Titonka, with the agreement to last for three years.

While the successor district and Thompson attempted a merge, the Titonka district chose not to pursue a merger with them. In November, 1994, the residents of the Buffalo Center–Rake–Lakota school district and the Thompson school district voted on whether they should consolidate into a single district. Meanwhile, the Titonka school district began whole-grade sharing with Woden-Crystal Lake. The residents of the Thompson district voted down that merger. Despite the failure, the Buffalo Center–Rake–Lakota and Thompson districts continued grade-sharing for the 1995–1996 school year. In November 1995, the second merger referendum for Buffalo Center–Rake–Lakota and Thompson occurred; this one succeeded. On July 1, 1996, it finally merged with Buffalo Center–Rake–Lakota, to become the North Iowa Community School District.
