= Buffalo Center–Rake–Lakota Community School District =

Former school district in Iowa

Buffalo Center–Rake–Lakota Community School District was a school district serving Buffalo Center, Lakota, and Rake, Iowa.

It was established on July 1, 1992, by the merger of the Buffalo Center–Rake Community School District and the Lakota Consolidated School District. The predecessor districts had already established a grade-sharing relationship between one another, as well as the Thompson Community School District and the Titonka Consolidated School District. The relationship continued with the single successor district, Thompson, and Titonka, with the agreement to last for three years. In November, 1994, the residents of the Buffalo Center–Rake–Lakota school district and the Thompson school district voted on whether they should consolidate into a single district; the Titonka school district opted not to be part of the merger. Voters in the BC-R-L district approved the merger, but the measure failed in the Thompson district. Despite this setback, Buffalo Center–Rake–Lakota and Thompson continued whole grade-sharing for the 1995–96 school year. Meanwhile, the Titonka school district began whole grade-sharing with the Woden–Crystal Lake Community School District. In November, 1995, a second merger referendum for Buffalo Center–Rake–Lakota and Thompson was held, which was approved by voters in both districts. On July 1, 1996, the merger became official, and the combined district adopted the name North Iowa Community School District.
