= Linden Township, Winnebago County, Iowa =

Township in Winnebago County, Iowa, U.S.

Coordinates: 43.299°N 93.793°W

Linden Township is a township in Winnebago County, Iowa, United States.

== History ==
Linden Township was founded in 1880.

The Mattison home was the site of Linden's first school, which began in 1873. Linden No. 2 provided instruction in 1887 and 1889. A photograph shows students at Linden No. 4 in 1919.
