= Winnebago County, Iowa =

County in Iowa, United States

- County
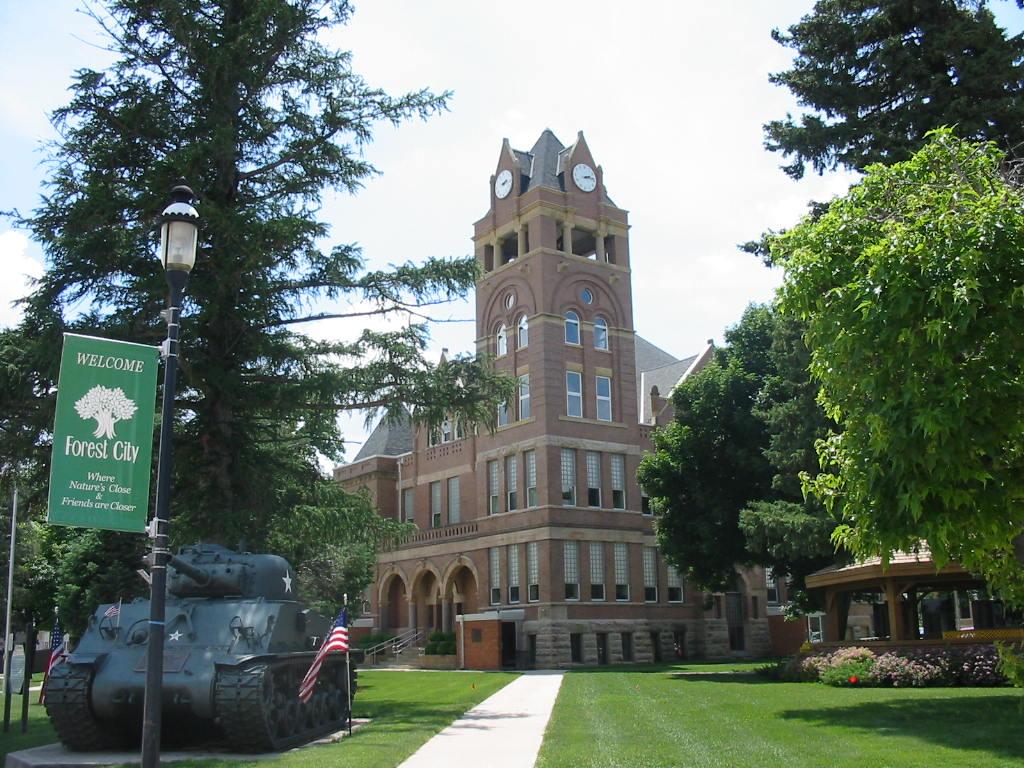
- The Winnebago County Courthouse in Forest City

- Location within the U.S. state of Iowa
- Coordinates: 43°22′44″N 93°43′55″W
- Country: United States
- State: Iowa
- Founded: 1847
- Named for: Winnebago tribe
- Seat: Forest City
- Largest city: Forest City

Area
  - Total: 402 sq mi (1,040 km^{2})
  - Land: 400 sq mi (1,000 km^{2})
  - Water: 3.3 sq mi (8.5 km^{2}) 0.3%

Population (2020)
  - Total: 10,679
  - Estimate (2025): 10,251 ▼
  - Density: 27/sq mi (10/km^{2})
- Time zone: UTC−6 (Central)
  - Summer (DST): UTC−5 (CDT)
- Congressional district: 4th
- Website: www.winnebagocountyiowa.gov
- Iowa county number 95

Winnebago County is a county in the U.S. state of Iowa. As of the 2020 census, the population was 10,679. The county seat is Forest City. The county was founded in 1847 and named after the Native American tribe. It is the location of the motor homes manufacturer Winnebago Industries.

== Geography ==
According to the United States Census Bureau, the county has an area of 402 square miles (1,040 km^{2}), of which 400 square miles (1,000 km^{2}) is land and 1.2 square miles (3.1 km^{2}) (0.3%) is water. It is Iowa's fifth-smallest county by land area and second-smallest by total area.

=== Adjacent counties ===
- Faribault County, Minnesota (northwest)
- Freeborn County, Minnesota (northeast)
- Worth County (east)
- Hancock County (south)
- Kossuth County (west)
- Cerro Gordo County (southeast)

== Transportation ==
=== Major highways ===
- U.S. Highway 69
- Iowa Highway 9

=== Airport ===
- Forest City Municipal Airport

== Demographics ==
Historical population
Census	Pop.	Note	%±
1860	168		—
1870	1,562		829.8%
1880	4,917		214.8%
1890	7,325		49.0%
1900	12,725		73.7%
1910	11,914		−6.4%
1920	13,489		13.2%
1930	13,143		−2.6%
1940	13,972		6.3%
1950	13,450		−3.7%
1960	13,099		−2.6%
1970	12,990		−0.8%
1980	13,010		0.2%
1990	12,122		−6.8%
2000	11,723		−3.3%
2010	10,866		−7.3%
2020	10,679		−1.7%
2025 (est.)	10,251	▼	−4.0%
U.S. Decennial Census; 1790–1960 1900–1990; 1990–2000 2010–2020

=== 2020 census ===
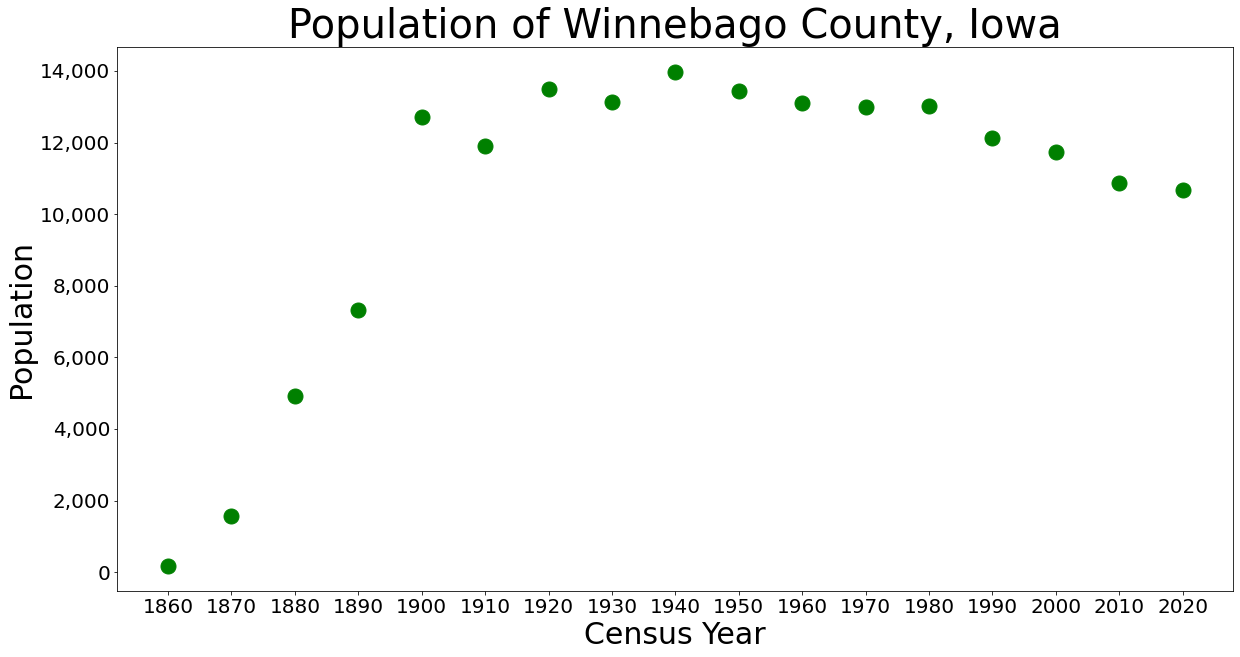
Population of Winnebago County from the U.S. census data

As of the 2020 census, the county had a population of 10,679 and a population density of 26.6/sq mi (10.3/km^{2}). The median age was 42.3 years, with 20.7% of residents under the age of 18 and 22.3% of residents 65 years of age or older. For every 100 females there were 99.0 males, and for every 100 females age 18 and over there were 99.3 males age 18 and over.

96.07% of the population reported being of one race. The racial makeup of the county was 90.5% White, 2.0% Black or African American, 0.2% American Indian and Alaska Native, 0.9% Asian, <0.1% Native Hawaiian and Pacific Islander, 2.4% from some other race, and 3.9% from two or more races. Hispanic or Latino residents of any race comprised 5.6% of the population.

Winnebago County Racial Composition
Race	Number	Percent
White (NH)	9,472	88.7%
Black or African American (NH)	204	2%
Native American (NH)	13	0.1%
Asian (NH)	94	0.9%
Pacific Islander (NH)	3	0.03%
Other/Mixed (NH)	299	2.8%
Hispanic or Latino	594	5.6%

<0.1% of residents lived in urban areas, while 100.0% lived in rural areas.

There were 4,512 households in the county, of which 24.4% had children under the age of 18 living in them. Of all households, 48.0% were married-couple households, 21.3% were households with a male householder and no spouse or partner present, and 24.5% were households with a female householder and no spouse or partner present. About 33.7% of all households were made up of individuals and 16.4% had someone living alone who was 65 years of age or older.

There were 5,077 housing units, of which 11.1% were vacant. Among occupied housing units, 74.0% were owner-occupied and 26.0% were renter-occupied. The homeowner vacancy rate was 2.0% and the rental vacancy rate was 10.3%.

=== 2010 census ===
As of the 2010 census recorded a population of 10,866 in the county, with a population density of 27.1/sq mi (10.5/km^{2}). There were 5,194 housing units, of which 4,597 were occupied.

=== 2000 census ===
As of the 2000 census, there were 11,723 people, 4,749 households, and 3,181 families in the county. The population density was 29 people per square mile (11 people/km^{2}). There were 5,065 housing units at an average density of 13 units per square mile (5.0 units/km^{2}). The racial makeup of the county was 97.37% white, 0.18% black or African American, 0.23% Native American, 0.72% Asian, 0.01% Pacific Islander, 1.01% from other races, and 0.49% from two or more races. 2.02% of the population were Hispanic or Latino of any race. Of the 4,749 households 30.60% had children under the age of 18 living with them, 56.90% were married couples living together, 7.20% had a female householder with no husband present, and 33.00% were non-families. 29.40% of households were one person and 14.70% were one person aged 65 or older. The average household size was 2.36 and the average family size was 2.91.

The age distribution was 24.10% under the age of 18, 9.80% from 18 to 24, 24.10% from 25 to 44, 23.10% from 45 to 64, and 18.90% 65 or older. The median age was 40 years. For every 100 females there were 95.50 males. For every 100 females age 18 and over, there were 92.90 males.

The median household income was $38,381 and the median family income was $47,306. Males had a median income of $30,720 versus $22,509 for females. The per capita income for the county was $18,494. About 5.00% of families and 8.40% of the population were below the poverty line, including 11.90% of those under age 18 and 8.20% of those age 65 or over.

== History ==
"When the first white settlers came into the county, and for some years thereafter, roving bands of Winnebago Indians made their temporary home within the limits of the county. At times there would be as many as one hundred living along the Lime Creek valley or about Coon Grove, and at other times there would be but a mere handful ... During the summer seasons they would cache their cooking utensils, leave their tepees standing and go northward into Minnesota to hunt and trap. At that time the Winnebago agency was located about forty miles north of Forest City." The Winnebago were removed after the Dakota War of 1862.

Initial settlement was in the wooded eastern third of the county, with prairie and marshy areas in the west being settled after 1880. Early teachers in Winnebago County were required to be able to converse in the language of their pupils. Many of the county's pioneers were of Norwegian descent.

The oldest standing structure in the county is Trinity Church, built in 1874.

In 1938, the Winnebago Rural Electric Cooperative was established. The first section of lines was energized on January 3, 1940.

A 1951 movie by the Rural Electrification Administration featured local residents describing the struggles for adequate phone service in Winnebago County, prior to the federal loan which enabled the Winnebago Cooperative Telephone Association to convert the area to modern dial service.

The Winnebago Industries RV manufacturing company was founded in Forest City in 1958.

The Winnebago Historical Society is located in the Mansion Museum in Forest City.

== Communities ==
=== Cities ===
- Buffalo Center
- Forest City
- Lake Mills
- Leland
- Rake
- Scarville
- Thompson

=== Townships ===
- Buffalo
- Center
- Eden
- Forest
- Grant
- King
- Lincoln
- Linden
- Logan
- Mount Valley
- Newton
- Norway

=== Population ranking ===
The population ranking of the following table is based on the 2020 census of Winnebago County.

† county seat

Rank	City/Town/etc.	Municipal type	Population (2020 Census)
1	† Forest City (partially in Hancock County)	City	4,285
2	Lake Mills	City	2,143
3	Buffalo Center	City	857
4	Thompson	City	495
5	Leland	City	249
6	Rake	City	186
7	Scarville	City	74

== Politics ==
Winnebago County has backed the statewide winner in every presidential election since 1996 with the exception of 2012, when it backed losing Republican Mitt Romney by just 3 votes over incumbent Democrat Barack Obama, and 2020.

United States presidential election results for Winnebago County, Iowa
Year	Republican		Democratic		Third party(ies)	
Year	No.	%	No.	%	No.	%
1896	1,912	72.12%	714	26.93%	25	0.94%
1900	2,052	79.63%	474	18.39%	51	1.98%
1904	2,002	89.45%	174	7.77%	62	2.77%
1908	1,710	76.07%	489	21.75%	49	2.18%
1912	532	23.85%	390	17.48%	1,309	58.67%
1916	1,713	72.92%	584	24.86%	52	2.21%
1920	3,931	87.08%	469	10.39%	114	2.53%
1924	2,445	47.27%	225	4.35%	2,502	48.38%
1928	3,386	70.09%	1,268	26.25%	177	3.66%
1932	2,012	36.59%	3,281	59.67%	206	3.75%
1936	2,592	43.73%	3,133	52.86%	202	3.41%
1940	3,308	51.78%	3,051	47.76%	29	0.45%
1944	2,808	51.24%	2,654	48.43%	18	0.33%
1948	2,636	48.36%	2,626	48.17%	189	3.47%
1952	4,574	70.38%	1,905	29.31%	20	0.31%
1956	3,926	60.84%	2,521	39.07%	6	0.09%
1960	4,082	62.33%	2,463	37.61%	4	0.06%
1964	2,331	38.74%	3,677	61.11%	9	0.15%
1968	3,543	59.51%	2,163	36.33%	248	4.17%
1972	4,300	64.48%	2,324	34.85%	45	0.67%
1976	3,315	52.24%	2,950	46.49%	81	1.28%
1980	3,808	58.77%	2,208	34.08%	463	7.15%
1984	3,616	57.27%	2,669	42.27%	29	0.46%
1988	2,863	50.20%	2,804	49.17%	36	0.63%
1992	2,407	39.60%	2,322	38.20%	1,349	22.19%
1996	2,211	40.05%	2,679	48.52%	631	11.43%
2000	2,662	48.16%	2,691	48.69%	174	3.15%
2004	3,175	53.34%	2,707	45.48%	70	1.18%
2008	2,730	44.86%	3,254	53.48%	101	1.66%
2012	2,906	49.10%	2,903	49.05%	109	1.84%
2016	3,447	59.56%	1,931	33.37%	409	7.07%
2020	3,707	62.09%	2,135	35.76%	128	2.14%
2024	3,636	64.45%	1,909	33.84%	97	1.72%

== Education ==
School districts include:

- Algona Community School District
- Forest City Community School District
- Lake Mills Community School District
- North Iowa Community School District

Former school districts:

- Titonka Consolidated School District, consolidated into Algona CSD on July 1, 2014.
- Woden-Crystal Lake Community School District, consolidated into Forest City CSD on July 1, 2013.

== See also ==
- National Register of Historic Places listings in Winnebago County, Iowa
