= Cedar Township, Calhoun County, Iowa =

Township in Iowa, US

Cedar Township, Calhoun County
- Township
- Coordinates: 42°20′31″N 094°27′38″W
- Country: United States
- State: Iowa
- County: Calhoun

Area
  - Total: 36.19 sq mi (93.74 km^{2})
  - Land: 36.19 sq mi (93.72 km^{2})
  - Water: 0.0077 sq mi (0.02 km^{2})
- Elevation: 1,152 ft (351 m)

Population (2000)
  - Total: 408
  - Density: 11/sq mi (4.4/km^{2})
- FIPS code: 19-90528
- GNIS feature ID: 0467550

Cedar Township is one of sixteen townships in Calhoun County, Iowa, United States. As of the 2000 census, its population was 408.

== History ==
Cedar Township was created in 1877. It is named from the Cedar Creek.

== Geography ==
Cedar Township covers an area of 36.19 square miles (93.7 km^{2}) and contains two incorporated settlements: Rinard and Somers. According to the USGS, it contains one cemetery, Cedar.
