= Calhoun County, Iowa =

County in Iowa, United States

- County
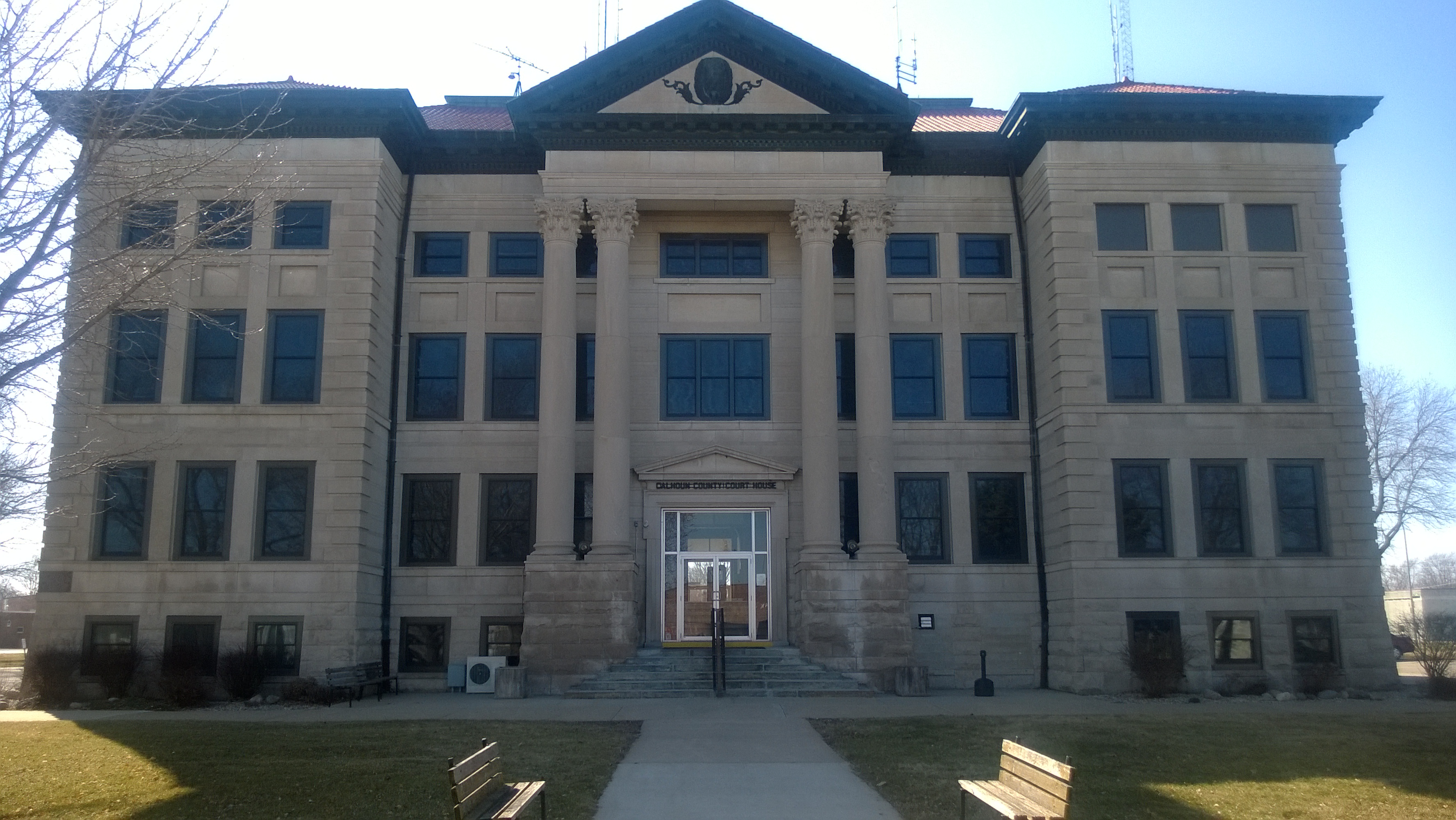
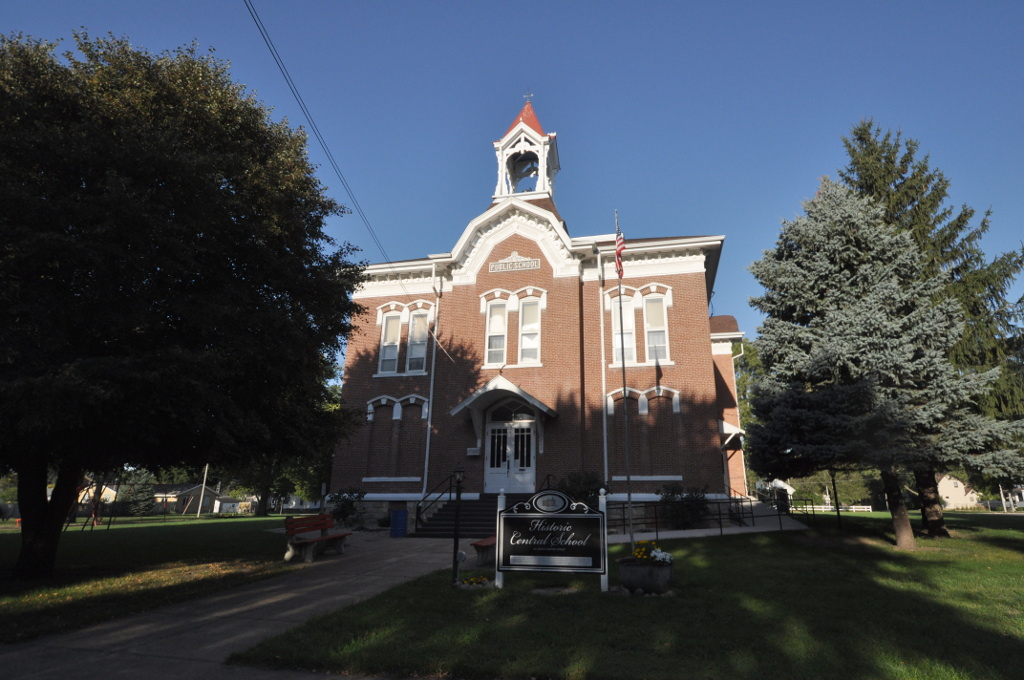
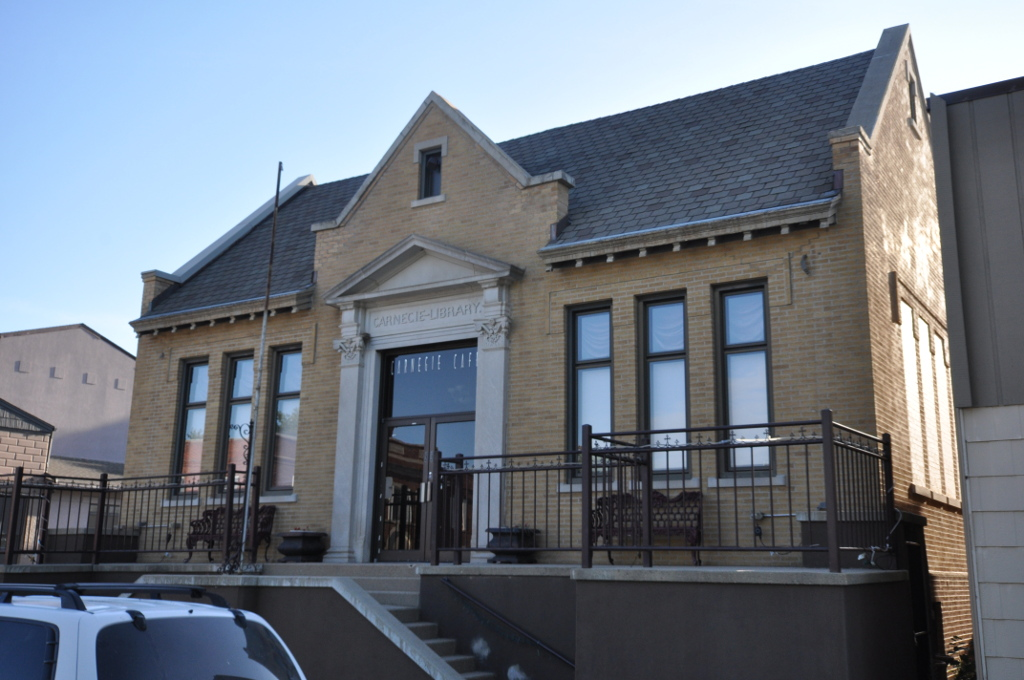
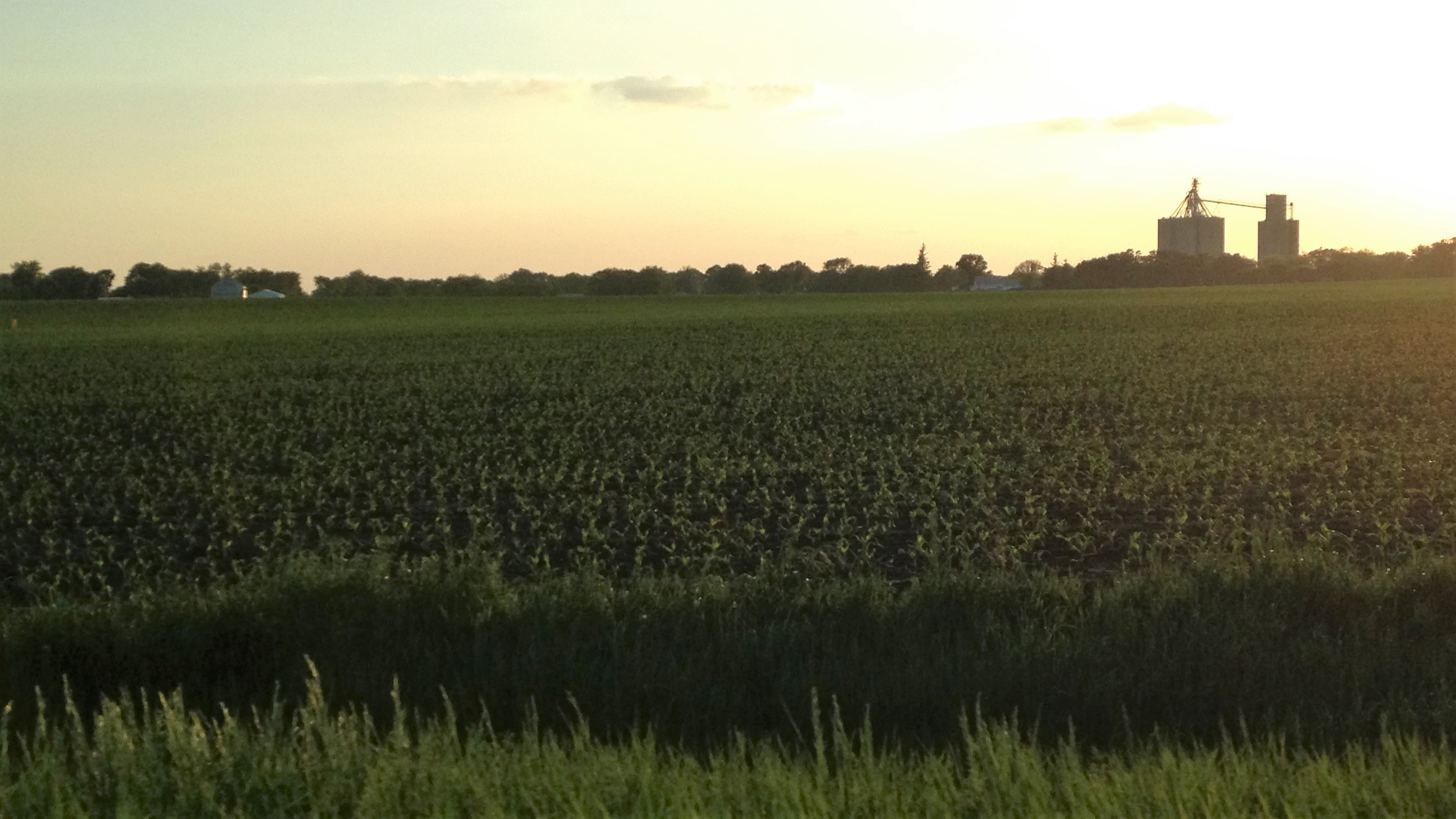
- Calhoun County Courthouse in Rockwell City The historic Central School in Lake City The former Lake City Public Library A grain elevator in the small town of Somers rises from a field at sunset

- Location within the U.S. state of Iowa
- Coordinates: 42.386061°N 94.643602°W
- Country: United States
- State: Iowa
- Founded: January 15, 1851 (created); November 7, 1855 (organized)
- Named for: John C. Calhoun
- Seat: Rockwell City
- Largest city: Rockwell City

Area
  - Total: 572.114 sq mi (1,481.77 km^{2})
  - Land: 569.846 sq mi (1,475.89 km^{2})
  - Water: 2.268 sq mi (5.87 km^{2}) 0.4%

Population (2020)
  - Total: 9,927
  - Estimate (2025): 9,562 ▼
  - Density: 17.42/sq mi (6.726/km^{2})
- Time zone: UTC−6 (Central)
  - Summer (DST): UTC−5 (CDT)
- Area code: 712
- Congressional district: 4th
- Website: calhouncounty.iowa.gov
- Iowa county number 13

Calhoun County is a county located in the U.S. state of Iowa. As of the 2020 census, the population was 9,927, and was estimated to be 9,562 in 2025. The county seat and largest city is Rockwell City.

== History ==
Calhoun County was formed on January 15, 1851, from open land originally named Fox County. It was renamed in 1853 after the seventh US vice president John C. Calhoun. When the tracks of the Illinois Central Railroad were laid through the county in 1870, the county seat was moved from Lake City to Rockwell City. The first train reached Rockwell City on August 7, 1882, and the population count doubled in the same year. The first courthouse, built of wood, burned to the ground in 1884 and the county government moved into a nearby hotel. In 1913, the current courthouse was built.

On July 6, 1893, Pomeroy was struck by a tornado that measured F5 on the Fujita scale. With a damage path 500 yards (460 m) wide and 55 miles (89 km) long, the tornado destroyed about 80% of the homes in Pomeroy. The tornado killed 71 people and injured 200.

== Geography ==
According to the United States Census Bureau, the county has a total area of 572.114 square miles (1,481.77 km^{2}), of which 569.846 square miles (1,475.89 km^{2}) is land and 2.268 square miles (5.87 km^{2}) (0.4%) is water. It is the 48th largest county in Iowa by total area.

=== Ecology ===
Calhoun County is located entirely within the Des Moines Lobe of the Western Corn Belt Plains ecoregion, as defined by the United States Environmental Protection Agency (EPA). One of the flattest regions in Iowa, the Des Moines Lobe ecoregion is a distinctive area naturally defined by Wisconsin glaciation but modified by humans for extensive agriculture. In general, the land is level to gently rolling with some areas of relief defined by glacial features like moraines, hummocky knobs, and kettles, and outwash deposits. The lobe does not have any loess deposits like the Loess Hills to the west.

The stream network is poorly developed and widely spaced, with major rivers carving valleys that are relatively deep and steep-sided. Almost all of the natural lakes of Iowa are found in the northern part of this region (the Iowa Great Lakes). Most of the region has been converted from wet prairie to agricultural use with substantial surface water drainage. Only a small fraction of the wetlands remain, and many natural lakes have been drained as a result of agricultural drainage projects via drainage tiles or ditches.

=== Major highways ===
- U.S. Highway 20
- Iowa Highway 4
- Iowa Highway 7
- Iowa Highway 175

=== Adjacent counties ===
- Pocahontas County (north)
- Webster County (east)
- Greene County (southeast)
- Carroll County (southwest)
- Sac County (west)

== Demographics ==
Historical population
Census	Pop.	Note	%±
1860	147		—
1870	1,602		989.8%
1880	5,595		249.3%
1890	13,107		134.3%
1900	18,569		41.7%
1910	17,090		−8.0%
1920	17,783		4.1%
1930	17,605		−1.0%
1940	17,584		−0.1%
1950	16,925		−3.7%
1960	15,923		−5.9%
1970	14,287		−10.3%
1980	13,542		−5.2%
1990	11,508		−15.0%
2000	11,115		−3.4%
2010	9,670		−13.0%
2020	9,927		2.7%
2025 (est.)	9,562	▼	−3.7%
U.S. Decennial Census; 1790–1960 1900–1990; 1990–2000 2010–2020

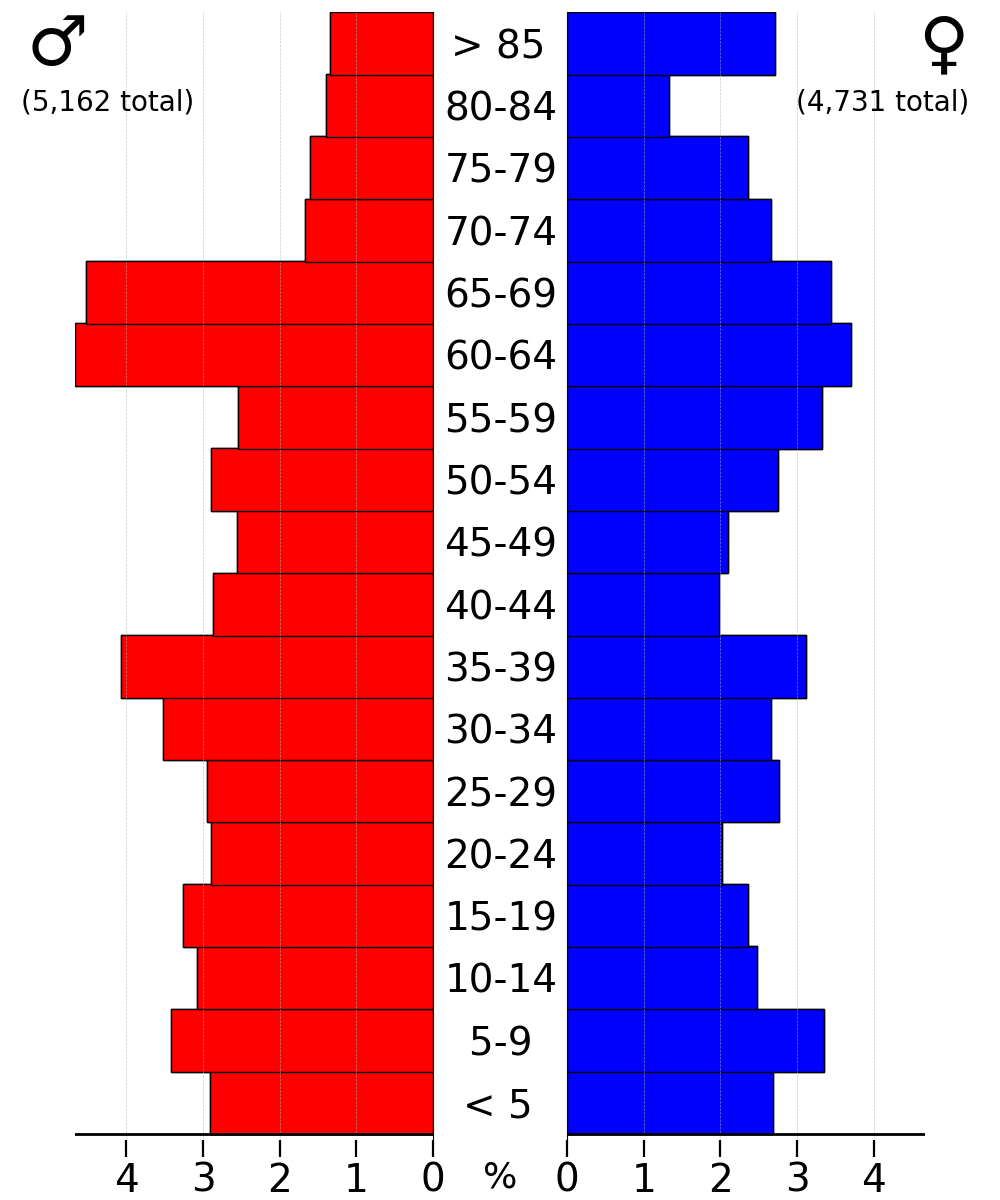
2022 US Census population pyramid for Calhoun County from ACS 5-year estimates

As of the second quarter of 2025, the median home value in Calhoun County was $128,711.

As of the 2023 American Community Survey, there are 3,886 estimated households in Calhoun County with an average of 2.35 persons per household. The county has a median household income of $66,875. Approximately 8.6% of the county's population lives at or below the poverty line. Calhoun County has an estimated 54.3% employment rate, with 21.5% of the population holding a bachelor's degree or higher and 93.7% holding a high school diploma. There were 4,794 housing units at an average density of 8.41 per square mile (3.2/km^{2}).

The top five reported languages (people were allowed to report up to two languages, thus the figures will generally add to more than 100%) were English (98.0%), Spanish (1.3%), Indo-European (0.6%), Asian and Pacific Islander (0.1%), and Other (0.0%).

The median age in the county was 42.7 years.

=== Racial and ethnic composition ===
Calhoun County, Iowa – racial and ethnic composition Note: the US Census treats Hispanic/Latino as an ethnic category. This table excludes Latinos from the racial categories and assigns them to a separate category. Hispanics/Latinos may be of any race.
Race / ethnicity (NH = non-Hispanic)	Pop. 1980	Pop. 1990	Pop. 2000	Pop. 2010	Pop. 2020
White alone (NH)	13,444 (99.28%)	11,404 (99.10%)	10,849 (97.61%)	9,470 (97.93%)	9,261 (93.29%)
Black or African American alone (NH)	21 (0.16%)	30 (0.26%)	76 (0.68%)	19 (0.20%)	151 (1.52%)
Native American or Alaska Native alone (NH)	8 (0.06%)	11 (0.10%)	21 (0.19%)	18 (0.19%)	22 (0.22%)
Asian alone (NH)	13 (0.10%)	22 (0.19%)	20 (0.18%)	20 (0.21%)	24 (0.24%)
Pacific Islander alone (NH)	—	—	0 (0.00%)	1 (0.01%)	8 (0.08%)
Other race alone (NH)	6 (0.04%)	1 (0.01%)	3 (0.03%)	2 (0.02%)	19 (0.19%)
Mixed race or multiracial (NH)	—	—	46 (0.41%)	50 (0.52%)	206 (2.08%)
Hispanic or Latino (any race)	50 (0.37%)	40 (0.35%)	100 (0.90%)	90 (0.93%)	236 (2.38%)
Total	13,542 (100.00%)	11,508 (100.00%)	11,115 (100.00%)	9,670 (100.00%)	9,927 (100.00%)

=== 2020 census ===
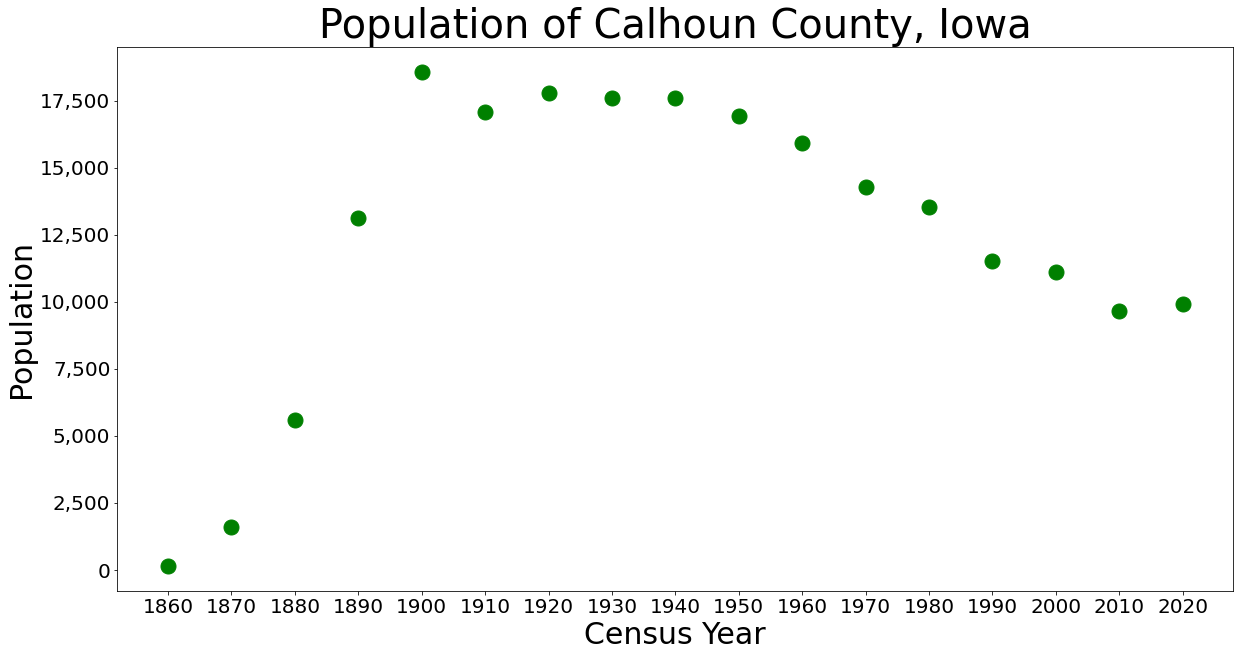
Population of Calhoun County from the U.S. census data

As of the 2020 census, there were 9,927 people, 4,070 households, and 2,578 families residing in the county. The population density was 17.42 inhabitants per square mile (6.7/km^{2}). There were 4,771 housing units at an average density of 8.37 per square mile (3.2/km^{2}).

The median age was 44.3 years. 21.4% of residents were under the age of 18 and 23.1% of residents were 65 years of age or older. For every 100 females there were 109.7 males, and for every 100 females age 18 and over there were 109.7 males age 18 and over.

The racial makeup of the county was 94.3% White, 1.5% Black or African American, 0.2% American Indian and Alaska Native, 0.3% Asian, 0.1% Native Hawaiian and Pacific Islander, 0.8% from some other race, and 2.8% from two or more races. Hispanic or Latino residents of any race comprised 2.4% of the population.

<0.1% of residents lived in urban areas, while 100.0% lived in rural areas.

There were 4,070 households in the county, of which 25.3% had children under the age of 18 living in them. Of all households, 51.2% were married-couple households, 18.5% were households with a male householder and no spouse or partner present, and 23.6% were households with a female householder and no spouse or partner present. About 32.3% of all households were made up of individuals and 16.5% had someone living alone who was 65 years of age or older.

There were 4,771 housing units, of which 14.7% were vacant. Among occupied housing units, 79.1% were owner-occupied and 20.9% were renter-occupied. The homeowner vacancy rate was 1.6% and the rental vacancy rate was 13.1%.

=== 2010 census ===
As of the 2010 census, there were 9,670 people, 4,242 households, and _ families residing in the county. The population density was 16.97 inhabitants per square mile (6.6/km^{2}). There were 5,108 housing units at an average density of 8.97 per square mile (3.5/km^{2}). The racial makeup of the county was 98.51% White, 0.23% African American, 0.20% Native American, 0.22% Asian, 0.01% Pacific Islander, 0.22% from some other races and 0.62% from two or more races. Hispanic or Latino people of any race were 0.93% of the population.

=== 2000 census ===
As of the 2020 census, there were 11,115 people, 4,513 households, and 3,014 families residing in the county. The population density was 19.49 inhabitants per square mile (7.5/km^{2}). There were 5,219 housing units at an average density of 9.15 per square mile (3.5/km^{2}). The racial makeup of the county was 98.06% White, 0.69% African American, 0.20% Native American, 0.18% Asian, 0.01% Pacific Islander, 0.34% from some other races and 0.52% from two or more races. Hispanic or Latino people of any race were 0.90% of the population.

There were 4,513 households, out of which 27.80% had children under the age of 18 living with them, 57.90% were married couples living together, 6.60% had a female householder with no husband present, and 33.20% were non-families. 30.50% of all households were made up of individuals, and 17.80% had someone living alone who was 65 years of age or older. The average household size was 2.31 and the average family size was 2.87.

In the county, the population was spread out, with 23.10% under the age of 18, 6.40% from 18 to 24, 24.80% from 25 to 44, 23.70% from 45 to 64, and 22.10% who were 65 years of age or older. The median age was 42 years. For every 100 females there were 98.10 males. For every 100 females age 18 and over, there were 97.60 males.

The median income for a household in the county was $33,286, and the median income for a family was $41,583. Males had a median income of $28,787 versus $20,095 for females. The per capita income for the county was $17,498. 10.10% of the population and 7.10% of families were below the poverty line. Out of the total population, 13.50% of those under the age of 18 and 8.50% of those 65 and older were living below the poverty line.

== Communities ==
=== Cities ===
- Farnhamville
- Jolley
- Knierim
- Lake City
- Lohrville
- Lytton
- Manson
- Pomeroy
- Rinard
- Rockwell City
- Somers
- Yetter

Census-designated Place

- Twin Lakes

=== Unincorporated communities ===
- Easley
- Knoke
- Lavinia
- Piper
- Rands
- Richard
- Sherwood
- Wightman

=== Townships ===
Calhoun County is divided into sixteen townships:

- Butler
- Calhoun
- Cedar
- Center
- Elm Grove
- Garfield
- Greenfield
- Jackson
- Lake Creek
- Lincoln
- Logan
- Reading
- Sherman
- Twin Lakes
- Union
- Williams

=== Population ranking ===
The population ranking of the following table is based on the 2020 census and the 2024 estimate of Calhoun County.

† county seat

Rank	City/Town/etc.	Municipal type	Population (2020 Census)	Population (2024 Estimate)
1	† Rockwell City	City	2,240	2,185
2	Lake City	City	1,731	1,656
3	Manson	City	1,709	1,646
4	Twin Lakes	CDP	316	535
5	Pomeroy	City	526	511
6	Lohrville	City	381	366
7	Farnhamville (partially in Webster County)	City	383	364
8	Lytton (mostly in Sac County)	City	282	274
9	Somers	City	128	121
10	Knierim	City	53	53
11	Rinard	City	38	38
12	Jolley	City	28	28
13	Yetter	City	19	19

== Politics ==
Politically, Calhoun County has favored the Republicans since 1896, usually only voting Democratic when the party won national victories. It first voted for the Democrats in 1932 when Franklin D. Roosevelt won in a landslide victory against Herbert Hoover. In 2000, Calhoun County voted for George W. Bush and has voted for the Republicans ever since. In 2016 Donald Trump won 67.2% percent of the vote in Calhoun County, the highest vote share since Dwight D. Eisenhower's victory in 1952. In 2020 and 2024, Trump increased it to 70.2% and 72.7% respectively, the highest percentages for any party in the county since Warren G. Harding a century earlier.

United States presidential election results for Calhoun County, Iowa
Year	Republican		Democratic		Third party(ies)	
Year	No.	%	No.	%	No.	%
1896	2,698	67.25%	1,280	31.90%	34	0.85%
1900	2,973	69.61%	1,224	28.66%	74	1.73%
1904	2,479	67.44%	870	23.67%	327	8.90%
1908	2,353	63.03%	1,152	30.86%	228	6.11%
1912	963	26.61%	1,182	32.66%	1,474	40.73%
1916	2,276	58.34%	1,515	38.84%	110	2.82%
1920	5,277	76.95%	1,479	21.57%	102	1.49%
1924	3,529	53.21%	714	10.77%	2,389	36.02%
1928	4,136	60.24%	2,681	39.05%	49	0.71%
1932	2,404	34.46%	4,368	62.61%	205	2.94%
1936	3,027	39.32%	4,544	59.02%	128	1.66%
1940	3,792	46.46%	4,344	53.23%	25	0.31%
1944	3,375	48.59%	3,544	51.02%	27	0.39%
1948	3,083	48.19%	3,164	49.45%	151	2.36%
1952	5,391	67.68%	2,411	30.27%	164	2.06%
1956	4,409	57.49%	2,972	38.75%	288	3.76%
1960	4,485	58.90%	3,123	41.01%	7	0.09%
1964	2,422	35.42%	4,407	64.46%	8	0.12%
1968	3,715	57.53%	2,361	36.56%	382	5.92%
1972	3,821	60.00%	2,446	38.41%	101	1.59%
1976	3,215	51.03%	3,001	47.63%	84	1.33%
1980	3,633	57.41%	2,150	33.98%	545	8.61%
1984	3,311	56.14%	2,541	43.08%	46	0.78%
1988	2,474	44.94%	2,990	54.31%	41	0.74%
1992	2,169	41.13%	2,140	40.58%	965	18.30%
1996	2,077	43.46%	2,193	45.89%	509	10.65%
2000	2,776	55.07%	2,132	42.29%	133	2.64%
2004	3,255	58.73%	2,243	40.47%	44	0.79%
2008	2,741	52.76%	2,341	45.06%	113	2.18%
2012	2,891	55.28%	2,238	42.79%	101	1.93%
2016	3,468	67.22%	1,398	27.10%	293	5.68%
2020	3,689	70.16%	1,470	27.96%	99	1.88%
2024	3,708	72.75%	1,328	26.05%	61	1.20%

== Education ==
School districts include:

- Manson Northwest Webster Community School District
- Newell-Fonda Community School District
- Pocahontas Area Community School District
- South Central Calhoun Community School District - Formed on July 1, 2014.
- Southeast Valley Community School District - Formed on July 1, 2023.

Former districts

- Prairie Valley Community School District - Merged into Southeast Valley on July 1, 2023.
- Rockwell City-Lytton Community School District - Merged into South Central Calhoun on July 1, 2014.
- Southern Cal Community School District - Merged into South Central Calhoun on July 1, 2014.

== See also ==
- National Register of Historic Places listings in Calhoun County, Iowa
- Calhoun County Courthouse

== Notable People ==
- Wesley Beschorner, American Football Coach
- Charles G. Boyd, United States Air Force General
- Kody Case, American Professional Football Player
- Thomas George Lanphier, Sr., United States Army Air Corps Officer
- Archer Macmankin, American Film Director
- John Norman Mundie, American Politician
- Gordon Prange, American Historian
- Paul Schell, Former Mayor of Seattle, Washington
- Hubert Stanley Wall, American Mathematician
