= Union Township, Calhoun County, Iowa =

Township in Iowa, US

Union Township, Calhoun County
- Township
- Coordinates: 42°15′04″N 094°34′56″W
- Country: United States
- State: Iowa
- County: Calhoun

Area
  - Total: 35.47 sq mi (91.86 km^{2})
  - Land: 35.47 sq mi (91.86 km^{2})
  - Water: 0 sq mi (0 km^{2})
- Elevation: 1,168 ft (356 m)

Population (2000)
  - Total: 573
  - Density: 16/sq mi (6.2/km^{2})
- FIPS code: 19-94179
- GNIS feature ID: 0468811

Union Township is one of sixteen townships in Calhoun County, Iowa, United States. As of the 2000 census, its population was 573.

== History ==
Union Township was created in 1878.

== Geography ==
Union Township covers an area of 35.47 square miles (91.9 km^{2}) and contains one incorporated settlement, Lohrville. According to the USGS, it contains two cemeteries: Evergreen and Evergreen.
