= Knierim =

Knierim may refer to:

== People ==
- Karen Knierim, American ice dancer
- Chris Knierim, American figure skater
- Alexa Scimeca Knierim, American figure skater

== Places ==
- Knierim, Iowa
