= Greenfield Township, Calhoun County, Iowa =

Township in Iowa, US

Greenfield Township, Calhoun County
- Township
- Coordinates: 42°25′37″N 094°27′20″W
- Country: United States
- State: Iowa
- County: Calhoun

Area
  - Total: 36.98 sq mi (95.77 km^{2})
  - Land: 36.98 sq mi (95.77 km^{2})
  - Water: 0 sq mi (0 km^{2})
- Elevation: 1,152 ft (351 m)

Population (2000)
  - Total: 275
  - Density: 7.5/sq mi (2.9/km^{2})
- FIPS code: 19-91758
- GNIS feature ID: 0467973

Greenfield Township is one of sixteen townships in Calhoun County, Iowa, United States. As of the 2000 census, its population was 275.

== History ==
Greenfield Township was created in 1870. It was probably named from the green prairie grass.

== Geography ==
Greenfield Township covers an area of 36.98 square miles (95.8 km^{2}) and contains one incorporated settlement, Knierim.
