= Butler Township, Calhoun County, Iowa =

Township in Iowa, US

Butler Township, Calhoun County
- Township
- Coordinates: 42°31′02″N 094°44′11″W
- Country: United States
- State: Iowa
- County: Calhoun

Area
  - Total: 35.60 sq mi (92.21 km^{2})
  - Land: 35.60 sq mi (92.21 km^{2})
  - Water: 0 sq mi (0 km^{2})
- Elevation: 1,220 ft (372 m)

Population (2000)
  - Total: 950
  - Density: 27/sq mi (10.3/km^{2})
- FIPS code: 19-90423
- GNIS feature ID: 0467514

Butler Township is one of sixteen townships in Calhoun County, Iowa, United States. As of the 2000 census, its population was 950.

== History ==
Butler Township was created in 1871.

== Geography ==
Butler Township covers an area of 35.6 square miles (92 km^{2}) and contains two incorporated settlements: Jolley and Pomeroy. According to the USGS, it contains three cemeteries: Crown Hill, Saint Marys and Union.
