= Elm Grove Township, Calhoun County, Iowa =

Township in Iowa, US

Elm Grove Township, Calhoun County
- Township
- Coordinates: 42°20′10″N 094°47′58″W
- Country: United States
- State: Iowa
- County: Calhoun

Area
  - Total: 35.10 sq mi (90.91 km^{2})
  - Land: 35.08 sq mi (90.86 km^{2})
  - Water: 0.015 sq mi (0.04 km^{2})
- Elevation: 1,171 ft (357 m)

Population (2000)
  - Total: 213
  - Density: 6.0/sq mi (2.3/km^{2})
- FIPS code: 19-91215
- GNIS feature ID: 0467789

Elm Grove Township is one of sixteen townships in Calhoun County, Iowa, United States. As of the 2000 census, its population was 213.

== History ==
Elm Grove Township was created in 1876. It takes its name from a natural grove of elm trees.

== Geography ==
Elm Grove Township covers an area of 35.1 square miles (91 km^{2}) and contains one incorporated settlement, Yetter.
