= Knoke, Iowa =

- Unincorporated community
- Location within Iowa
- Coordinates: 42°31′01″N 94°45′47″W
- Country: United States
- State: Iowa
- County: Calhoun
- Elevation: 1,237 ft (377 m)
- Time zone: UTC-6 (Central (CST))
  - Summer (DST): UTC-5 (CDT)
- Area code: 712
- GNIS feature ID: 458132

Knoke is an unincorporated community in Calhoun County, Iowa, United States. Knoke is 4.5 miles (7.2 km) west-southwest of Pomeroy.

Knoke lies near the southwestern margin (rim) of Manson crater, an impact structure buried by glacial till and outwash.

== History ==
Knoke was platted in 1901. It is named for its founder, William Knoke. The population of the community was just 8 in 1902, and 17 in 1925. The population was 50 in 1940.

According to the community's welcome sign, its population was 21 in 2001. The welcome sign advertises that Knoke is available via the next three exits which are the streets "Knoke Main", "Knoke Drive", and "Knoke Road".
