= MNW =

MNW or mnw may refer to:

- MNW Music, a Swedish record company
- MNW, an Indian English Movie channel
- ISO 639-3 code for modern Mon language

MNW is an abbreviation of:

- MNW, Muzeum Narodowe w Warszawie
- Manson–Northwest Webster Community School District
