= Reading Township, Calhoun County, Iowa =

Township in Iowa, US

Reading Township, Calhoun County
- Township
- Coordinates: 42°15′08″N 094°27′16″W
- Country: United States
- State: Iowa
- County: Calhoun

Area
  - Total: 35.62 sq mi (92.25 km^{2})
  - Land: 35.60 sq mi (92.21 km^{2})
  - Water: 0.015 sq mi (0.04 km^{2})
- Elevation: 1,135 ft (346 m)

Population (2000)
  - Total: 588
  - Density: 17/sq mi (6.4/km^{2})
- FIPS code: 19-93546
- GNIS feature ID: 0468590

Reading Township is one of sixteen townships in Calhoun County, Iowa, United States. As of the 2000 census, its population was 588.

== History ==
Reading Township was created in 1875. It was named for Charles H. Reading, a pioneer settler.

== Geography ==
Reading Township covers an area of 35.62 square miles (92.3 km^{2}) and contains one incorporated settlement, Farnhamville. According to the USGS, it contains two cemeteries: Reading and Saint Joseph.
