= Center Township, Calhoun County, Iowa =

Township in Iowa, US

- Township
- Coordinates: 42°25′39″N 094°34′21″W
- Country: United States
- State: Iowa
- County: Calhoun

Area
  - Total: 36.62 sq mi (94.85 km^{2})
  - Land: 36.59 sq mi (94.78 km^{2})
  - Water: 0.027 sq mi (0.07 km^{2})
- Elevation: 1,191 ft (363 m)

Population (2000)
  - Total: 1,195
  - Density: 33/sq mi (12.6/km^{2})
- FIPS code: 19-90585
- GNIS feature ID: 0467570

Center Township is one of sixteen townships in Calhoun County, Iowa, United States. As of 2025, its population has reached 1,296 people.

== History ==
Center Township was created in 1872. It is named after its location which is near the center of the county.

== Geography ==
Center Township covers an area of 36.62 square miles (94.8 km^{2}) and contains no incorporated settlements. According to the USGS, it contains five cemeteries: Greenwood, Reformatory, Rosehill, Saint Francis and Saint James.
