= Southeast Valley Community School District =

School district in Iowa, United States

Coordinates: 42.281742°N 94.289019°W

Location
- Gowrie, Iowa Boone, Calhoun, Webster, and Greene counties 50543; United States
- Coordinates: 42.281742, -94.289019

District information
- Established: 2023
- Superintendent: Brian Johnson
- Schools: 4
- Budget: $21,255,000 (2020-21 (combined from the two predecessor districts))
- NCES District ID

Students and staff
- Students: 1084 (2022-23)
- Teachers: 95.97 FTE
- Staff: 112.74 FTE
- Student–teacher ratio
- Athletic conference: Twin Lakes
- District mascot: Jaguars
- Colors: Teal, Silver, and Black

Other information
- Website: www.southeastvalley.org

Southeast Valley Community School District is a rural public school district headquartered in Gowrie, Iowa.

The district includes sections of the following counties: Webster, Calhoun, Boone, and Greene. Municipalities in the district include Gowrie, Boxholm, Callender, Dayton, Farnhamville, Fraser, Harcourt, Lehigh, Moorland, Pilot Mound, Rinard, and Somers. The district also includes the unincorporated areas of Burnside, Lanyon, and Slifer.

Its land area is about 500 square miles (1,300 km^{2}). It is the second largest school district in Iowa by land area, after the Western Dubuque Community School District.

== History ==
On March 2, 2022, voters of two districts, Prairie Valley Community School District and Southeast Webster-Grand Community School District, agreed to consolidate into one district, effective fall 2023. The two districts had established a grade-sharing agreement in 2014 where they had joint secondary schools.

The Southeast Valley school district was established on July 1, 2023. For the 2023–2024 school year, the school district continued operating the schools from the predecessor districts. Bill Shea, editor of The Messenger stated that as the secondary schools had already been consolidated, in regards to the merger of the school districts themselves, "there will not be much noticeable difference for students, parents and others."

== Schools ==
- Southeast Valley High School - Gowrie
- Southeast Valley Middle School - Burnside
- Dayton Elementary School - Dayton
- Farnhamville Elementary School - Farnhamville
