= Logan Township, Calhoun County, Iowa =

Township in Iowa, US

Logan Township, Calhoun County
- Township
- Coordinates: 42°20′25″N 094°34′31″W
- Country: United States
- State: Iowa
- County: Calhoun

Area
  - Total: 36.1 sq mi (93.6 km^{2})
  - Land: 36.14 sq mi (93.59 km^{2})
  - Water: 0.0039 sq mi (0.01 km^{2})
- Elevation: 1,184 ft (361 m)

Population (2000)
  - Total: 142
  - Density: 3.9/sq mi (1.5/km^{2})
- FIPS code: 19-92688
- GNIS feature ID: 0468295

Logan Township is one of sixteen townships in Calhoun County, Iowa, United States. As of the 2000 census, its population was 142.

== History ==
Logan Township was created in 1879. It is named for Gen. John A. Logan.

== Geography ==
Logan Township covers an area of 36.14 square miles (93.6 km^{2}) and contains no incorporated settlements. According to the USGS, it contains three cemeteries: Logan Township, Piper and Roby.
