= Lavinia, Iowa =

- Unincorporated community
- Location within Iowa
- Country: United States
- State: Iowa
- County: Calhoun
- Elevation: 1,217 ft (371 m)
- Time zone: UTC-6 (Central (CST))
  - Summer (DST): UTC-5 (CDT)
- Area code: 712
- GNIS feature ID: 458246

Lavinia is an unincorporated community in Calhoun County, Iowa, in the United States.

== History ==
Lavinia was platted and laid out in 1899. Its population in 1915 was 69. The population was 61 in 1940.
