= Southeast Valley High School =

Public secondary school in Gowrie, Iowa, United States

Location
- 1005 Riddle Street; Gowrie, Iowa 50543; United States
- 42.2793°N 94.2963°W

Information
- Former name: Prairie Valley High School
- Type: Public secondary
- Established: 2014
- School district: Southeast Valley Community School District (2023-); Prairie Valley Community School District (in association with the Southeast Webster-Grand Community School District) (2014-2023)
- Principal: Kerry Ketcham
- Teaching staff: 20.03 FTE
- Grades: 9-12
- Enrollment: 342 (2023-2024)
- Student to teacher ratio: 16.88
- Campus type: Rural
- Colors: Teal, silver, and black
- Nickname: Jaguars
- Website: www.southeastvalley.org/high-school

Southeast Valley High School is a high school in Gowrie, Iowa, United States, operated by the Southeast Valley Community School District.

Prior to the merger into Southeast Valley district in 2023, the school was operated by the Prairie Valley Community School District, in association with the Southeast Webster-Grand Community School District, as "Southeast Valley Schools".

Municipalities in the merged school district, of which Southeast Valley HS is the sole comprehensive high school, include Gowrie, Boxholm, Callender, Dayton, Farnhamville, Fraser, Harcourt, Lehigh, Moorland, Pilot Mound, Rinard, and Somers. The district also includes the unincorporated areas of Burnside, Lanyon, and Slifer.

== History ==
Previously Prairie Valley High School in Gowrie was the high school of the Prairie Valley district.

In August 2014, the Prairie Valley district began a whole grade-sharing arrangement with the Southeast Webster-Grand district as a way to deal with smaller enrollments and as a way to save money. The two districts together share middle and high schools.

By 2019, the school received new renovations, including a new main entrance with extra security features. Visitors are required to pass through the administrative offices before being able to access the rest of the building.

The Prairie Valley and Southeast Webster-Grand school districts merged into a single school district in 2023. Therefore Southeast Valley HS became the sole high school of the post-merger district.

== Athletics ==
The Jaguars compete in the Twin Lakes Conference in the following sports:

- Cross country
- Volleyball
- Football
  - 2021 Class 2A State Champions
- Basketball
- Wrestling
- Track and field
- Golf
- Baseball
- Softball

== Notable alumni ==
- Kyler Fisher (2019), professional football player
- Aaron Graves (2022), college football defensive lineman for the Iowa Hawkeyes

== See also ==
- List of high schools in Iowa
