= Lincoln Township, Calhoun County, Iowa =

Township in Iowa, US

Lincoln Township, Calhoun County
- Township
- Coordinates: 42°31′13″N 094°29′51″W
- Country: United States
- State: Iowa
- County: Calhoun

Area
  - Total: 35.32 sq mi (91.48 km^{2})
  - Land: 35.19 sq mi (91.14 km^{2})
  - Water: 0.13 sq mi (0.34 km^{2})
- Elevation: 1,237 ft (377 m)

Population (2000)
  - Total: 2,150
  - Density: 61/sq mi (23.6/km^{2})
- FIPS code: 19-92532
- GNIS feature ID: 0468243

Lincoln Township is one of sixteen townships in Calhoun County, Iowa, United States. As of the 2000 census, its population was 2,150.

== History ==
Lincoln Township was created in 1866. It was named in honor of Abraham Lincoln, who had been assassinated the year before.

== Geography ==
Lincoln Township covers an area of 35.32 square miles (91.5 km^{2}) and contains one incorporated settlement, Manson. According to the USGS, it contains four cemeteries: Hope, Rose Hill, Saint Thomas and Trinity.
