= Williams Township, Calhoun County, Iowa =

Township in Iowa, US

Williams Township, Calhoun County
- Township
- Coordinates: 42°31′25″N 094°51′41″W
- Country: United States
- State: Iowa
- County: Calhoun

Area
  - Total: 35.76 sq mi (92.61 km^{2})
  - Land: 35.71 sq mi (92.49 km^{2})
  - Water: 0.046 sq mi (0.12 km^{2})
- Elevation: 1,211 ft (369 m)

Population (2000)
  - Total: 178
  - Density: 4.9/sq mi (1.9/km^{2})
- FIPS code: 19-94734
- GNIS feature ID: 0469000

Williams Township is one of sixteen townships in Calhoun County, Iowa, United States. As of the 2000 census, its population was 178.

== History ==
Williams Township was created in 1870. It was originally intended to name the township "Three Williams" after its founders, William Stott, William Bush, and William Kennedy, but when the township was organized the "three" was omitted.

== Geography ==
Williams Township covers an area of 35.76 square miles (92.6 km^{2}) and contains no incorporated settlements. According to the USGS, it contains one cemetery, Saint John.
