= South Central Calhoun Community School District =

Public school district in Rockwell City, Iowa, United States

Coordinates: 42.392467°N 94.645342°W

Location
- Rockwell City, Iowa Calhoun, Carroll, Greene and Sac counties United States
- Coordinates: 42.392467, -94.645342

District information
- Type: Local school district
- Grades: K–12
- Established: 2014
- Superintendent: Brad Anderson
- Schools: 3
- Budget: $14,674,000 (2020-21)
- NCES District ID: 1900024

Students and staff
- Students: 916 (2022-23)
- Teachers: 77.33 FTE
- Staff: 94.08 FTE
- Student–teacher ratio: 11.85
- Athletic conference: Twin Lakes
- District mascot: Titans
- Colors: Purple, black and silver

Other information
- Website: www.scc.k12.ia.us

South Central Calhoun Community School District is a rural public school district headquartered inside South Central Calhoun Middle School in Rockwell City, Iowa.

The district is mostly in Calhoun County, but also has sections in Carroll, Greene and Sac counties. It serves Rockwell City, Jolley, Lake City, Lohrville, Lytton, Yetter, and much of Lanesboro.

The district operates three schools: South Central Calhoun Elementary School in Rockwell City, South Central Calhoun Middle, and South Central Calhoun High School in Lake City. As of 2014, it had 900 students.

== History ==
The district formed on July 1, 2014, from the merger of the Rockwell City–Lytton Community School District and the Southern Cal Community School District. In 2009, the predecessor districts decided to begin sharing athletics and secondary grades, in which students from both districts attended each other districts' schools, and by 2012–13, all grade levels became shared. On Tuesday, February 5, 2013, the districts held an election on whether they would consolidate. The vote to consolidate was successful, with a 253–67 count in Rockwell City–Lytton and 340–86 in Southern Calhoun; a total of 746 people voted.

Jeff Kruse, who previously was the shared superintendent of the two predecessor districts, was the first superintendent; that year the East Sac County Community School District requested that the South Central Calhoun district share its superintendent with them. The South Central Calhoun leadership decided against this since it did not wish to suggest that it would eventually merge with another district so quickly after the district had formed; under Iowa law a district may only do grade-sharing with another district adjacent to it, and Iowa residents often see grade-sharing as an indication that a merger will eventually occur. However non-contiguous districts may share superintendents, and South Central Calhoun entered a superintendent-sharing agreement with a non-contiguous district, Laurens–Marathon Community School District. Kruse was scheduled to leave at the end of the 2016–17 school year.

Brad Anderson was named superintendent in 2020.

== Schools ==
The district operate three schools:

- South Central Calhoun Middle School, Rockwell City
- South Central Calhoun High School, Lake City
- South Central Calhoun Elementary, Rockwell City

=== South Central Calhoun High School ===
==== Athletics ====
The Titans compete in the Twin Lakes Conference in the following sports:

- Cross country
- Volleyball
- Football
- Basketball
- Wrestling
- Track and field
- Golf
- Baseball
- Softball

== See also ==
- List of school districts in Iowa
- List of high schools in Iowa
