= Jolley, Iowa =

- City
- Location of Jolley, Iowa
- Coordinates: 42°28′46″N 94°43′09″W
- Country: USA
- State: Iowa
- County: Calhoun

Government
  - Mayor: J. R. Johnson

Area
  - Total: 0.085 sq mi (0.22 km^{2})
  - Land: 0.085 sq mi (0.22 km^{2})
  - Water: 0 sq mi (0.00 km^{2})
- Elevation: 1,227 ft (374 m)

Population (2020)
  - Total: 28
  - Density: 322.8/sq mi (124.62/km^{2})
- Time zone: UTC-6 (Central (CST))
  - Summer (DST): UTC-5 (CDT)
- ZIP code: 50551
- Area code: 712
- FIPS code: 19-39900
- GNIS feature ID: 2395478

Jolley is a city in Calhoun County, Iowa, United States. The population was 28 at the time of the 2020 census.

== History ==
Jolley was platted in 1883. The town was incorporated in 1895.

== Geography ==
According to the United States Census Bureau, the city has a total area of 0.12 square miles (0.31 km^{2}), all land.

Jolley lies at the southwestern margin (rim) of Manson crater, an impact structure buried by glacial till and outwash.

== Demographics ==
Historical populations
Year	Pop.	±%
1900	266	—
1910	250	−6.0%
1920	300	+20.0%
1930	174	−42.0%
1940	161	−7.5%
1950	195	+21.1%
1960	120	−38.5%
1970	112	−6.7%
1980	91	−18.8%
1990	68	−25.3%
2000	54	−20.6%
2010	41	−24.1%
2020	28	−31.7%
Source:"U.S. Census website". United States Census Bureau. and Iowa Data Center; Source: U.S. Decennial Census

=== 2020 census ===
As of the census of 2020, there were 28 people, 12 households, and 8 families residing in the city. The population density was 322.8 inhabitants per square mile (124.6/km^{2}). There were 24 housing units at an average density of 276.7 per square mile (106.8/km^{2}). The racial makeup of the city was 100.0% White, 0.0% Black or African American, 0.0% Native American, 0.0% Asian, 0.0% Pacific Islander, 0.0% from other races and 0.0% from two or more races. Hispanic or Latino persons of any race comprised 3.6% of the population.

Of the 12 households, 16.7% of which had children under the age of 18 living with them, 58.3% were married couples living together, 8.3% were cohabitating couples, 16.7% had a female householder with no spouse or partner present and 16.7% had a male householder with no spouse or partner present. 33.3% of all households were non-families. 25.0% of all households were made up of individuals, 16.7% had someone living alone who was 65 years old or older.

The median age in the city was 64.0 years. 10.7% of the residents were under the age of 20; 0.0% were between the ages of 20 and 24; 25.0% were from 25 and 44; 14.3% were from 45 and 64; and 50.0% were 65 years of age or older. The gender makeup of the city was 50.0% male and 50.0% female.

=== 2010 census ===
As of the census of 2010, there were 41 people, 21 households, and 12 families living in the city. The population density was 341.7 inhabitants per square mile (131.9/km^{2}). There were 33 housing units at an average density of 275.0 per square mile (106.2/km^{2}). The racial makeup of the city was 100.0% White. Hispanic or Latino of any race were 4.9% of the population.

There were 21 households, of which 19.0% had children under the age of 18 living with them, 42.9% were married couples living together, 4.8% had a female householder with no husband present, 9.5% had a male householder with no wife present, and 42.9% were non-families. 42.9% of all households were made up of individuals, and 9.6% had someone living alone who was 65 years of age or older. The average household size was 1.95 and the average family size was 2.58.

The median age in the city was 49.6 years. 14.6% of residents were under the age of 18; 7.3% were between the ages of 18 and 24; 14.6% were from 25 to 44; 51.2% were from 45 to 64; and 12.2% were 65 years of age or older. The gender makeup of the city was 61.0% male and 39.0% female.

=== 2000 census ===
As of the census of 2000, there were 54 people, 28 households, and 12 families living in the city. The population density was 469.1 inhabitants per square mile (181.1/km^{2}). There were 39 housing units at an average density of 338.8 per square mile (130.8/km^{2}). The racial makeup of the city was 100.00% White. Hispanic or Latino of any race were 1.85% of the population.

There were 28 households, out of which 21.4% had children under the age of 18 living with them, 35.7% were married couples living together, 10.7% had a female householder with no husband present, and 53.6% were non-families. 50.0% of all households were made up of individuals, and 25.0% had someone living alone who was 65 years of age or older. The average household size was 1.93 and the average family size was 2.92.

In the city, the population was spread out, with 22.2% under the age of 18, 11.1% from 18 to 24, 20.4% from 25 to 44, 27.8% from 45 to 64, and 18.5% who were 65 years of age or older. The median age was 42 years. For every 100 females, there were 134.8 males. For every 100 females age 18 and over, there were 121.1 males.

The median income for a household in the city was $24,286, and the median income for a family was $48,125. Males had a median income of $30,625 versus $26,250 for females. The per capita income for the city was $23,268. There were 18.2% of families and 12.3% of the population living below the poverty line, including no under eighteens and 33.3% of those over 64.

== Education ==
It is within the South Central Calhoun Community School District.

Jolley was previously in the Rockwell City–Lytton Community School District, formed on July 1, 1993. That district merged into South Central Calhoun on July 1, 2014.
