= Richard, Iowa =

- Unincorporated community
- Location within Iowa
- Country: United States
- State: Iowa
- County: Calhoun
- Elevation: 1,184 ft (361 m)
- Time zone: UTC-6 (Central (CST))
  - Summer (DST): UTC-5 (CDT)
- Area code: 712
- GNIS feature ID: 460609

Richard is an unincorporated community in Calhoun County, Iowa, in the United States.

== History ==
Richard (formerly Richards) was laid out and platted in June 1900. It was named for its founders, E. A. and Bessie P. Richards. The population was 50 in 1940.
