= Piper, Iowa =

- Unincorporated community
- Location within Iowa
- Country: United States
- State: Iowa
- County: Calhoun
- Elevation: 1,188 ft (362 m)
- Time zone: UTC-6 (Central (CST))
  - Summer (DST): UTC-5 (CDT)
- Area code: 712
- GNIS feature ID: 464701

Piper is an unincorporated community in Calhoun County, Iowa, in the United States.

== History ==
Piper was a station on the Fort Dodge, Des Moines & Southern Railroad. The population of Piper was 20 in 1940.
