= Wightman, Iowa =

- Unincorporated community
- Location within Iowa Location within the United States
- Coordinates: 42°13′57″N 94°36′35″W
- Country: United States
- State: Iowa
- County: Calhoun
- Elevation: 1,165 ft (355 m)
- Time zone: UTC-6 (Central (CST))
  - Summer (DST): UTC-5 (CDT)
- Area code: 712
- GNIS feature ID: 464802

Wightman is an unincorporated community in Calhoun County, Iowa, in the United States. It has a population of less than 500 individuals.

== History ==
Wightman was platted in 1903 when the Chicago Great Western Railroad was extended to that point. It was named for one of its founders, R. C. Wight.

Wightman's population was 35 in 1925. The population was 10 in 1940.
