= Garfield Township, Calhoun County, Iowa =

Township in Iowa, US

Garfield Township, Calhoun County
- Township
- Coordinates: 42°26′07″N 094°47′45″W
- Country: United States
- State: Iowa
- County: Calhoun

Area
  - Total: 34.64 sq mi (89.73 km^{2})
  - Land: 34.64 sq mi (89.73 km^{2})
  - Water: 0 sq mi (0 km^{2})
- Elevation: 1,220 ft (372 m)

Population (2000)
  - Total: 230
  - Density: 6.7/sq mi (2.6/km^{2})
- FIPS code: 19-91509
- GNIS feature ID: 0467890

Garfield Township is one of sixteen townships in Calhoun County, Iowa, United States. As of the 2000 census, its population was 230.

== History ==
Garfield Township was created in 1882. It was named for James A. Garfield, 20th President of the United States, who had been assassinated the year prior.

== Geography ==
Garfield Township covers an area of 34.64 square miles (89.7 km^{2}) and contains no incorporated settlements. According to the USGS, it contains one cemetery, Garfield.
