= Rands, Iowa =

- Unincorporated community
- Location within Iowa
- Country: United States
- State: Iowa
- County: Calhoun
- Elevation: 1,181 ft (360 m)

Population (2020)
  - Total: 3
- Time zone: UTC-6 (Central (CST))
  - Summer (DST): UTC-5 (CDT)
- Area code: 712
- GNIS feature ID: 464712

Rands is an unincorporated community in Calhoun County, Iowa, in the United States.

== History ==
Rands was founded in 1891. Rands' population was 12 in 1902. The population was 20 in 1940.
