= Calhoun County Courthouse (Iowa) =

- U.S. National Register of Historic Places
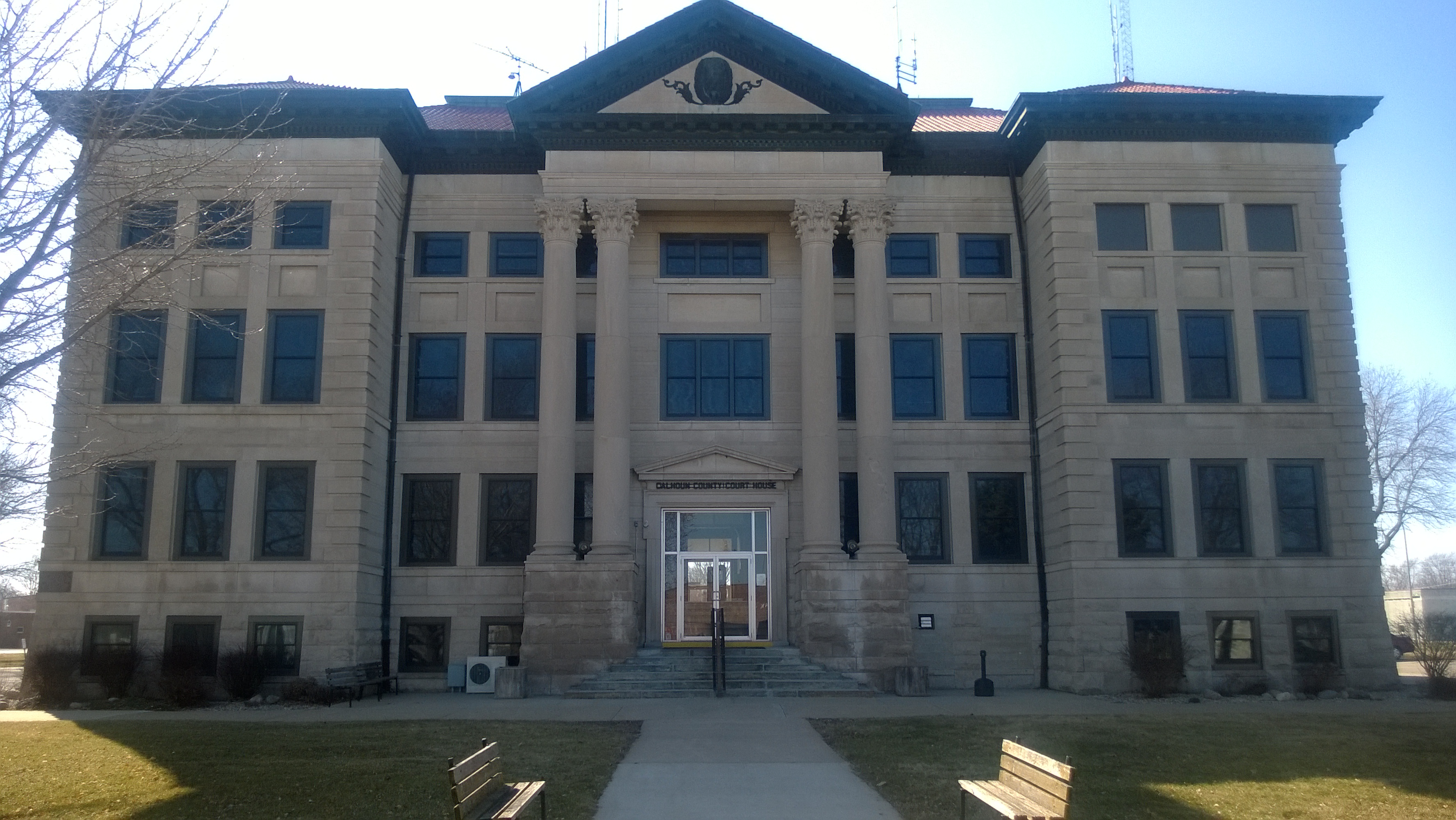

- Location within Iowa Location within the United States
- Interactive map showing the location for Calhoun County Courthouse
- Location: Court and 4th Sts. Rockwell City, Iowa
- Coordinates: 42°23′41″N 94°38′7″W
- Area: less than one acre
- Built: 1914
- Built by: Falls City Construction Co.
- Architect: W.F. Gernandt
- Architectural style: Classical Revival
- MPS: County Courthouses in Iowa TR
- NRHP reference No.: 81000227
- Added to NRHP: July 2, 1981

The Calhoun County Courthouse, located in Rockwell City, Iowa, United States, was built in 1914. It was listed on the National Register of Historic Places in 1981 as a part of the County Courthouses in Iowa Thematic Resource. The courthouse is the fourth structure to house court functions and county administration.

== History ==
When Calhoun County was established in 1855 there were no buildings suitable for a courthouse, so officials used their own homes. After Lake City was chosen as the county seat the following year a small structure was built for a courthouse. Additions were added to the building as space needs increased. The county seat moved to Rockwell City in 1877 and a new courthouse built for just over $2,000. County officials had their offices on the first floor and a courtroom was located on the second floor. The building was destroyed by fire in 1884. The county rented a hotel and a building in town for $1 a day to house offices and functions. Officials built another courthouse in 1886 on the park across the street from the old courthouse square because noise from the nearby railroad disturbed court business.

The present Neoclassical structure was built for $116,200 in 1914. They sold the old courthouse to a Catholic church for use as a parochial school, and it was moved to a different location. The building is clad in limestone and the roof is composed of clay tiles. Four pillars hold up the pediment of the central pavilion. The interior is considered more noteworthy than the exterior. Of particular interest is the three-story rotunda with its stained glass skylight. The second floor features ceramic tile floors and a coffered ceiling in the courtroom. The building was designed by Nebraska architect William F. Gernandt. Its significance is derived from its association with county government, and the political power and prestige of Rockwell City as the county seat.
