= Lanyon, Iowa =

Lanyon
- Unincorporated community
- Location within the state of Iowa Lanyon (the United States)
- Coordinates: 42°13′21″N 94°11′43″W
- Country: United States
- State: Iowa
- County: Webster
- Elevation: 1,175 ft (358 m)
- Time zone: UTC-6 (Central (CST))
  - Summer (DST): UTC-5 (CDT)
- ZIP code: 50544
- GNIS feature ID: 458228

Lanyon is an unincorporated community in Lost Grove Township in Webster County, Iowa.

== Geography ==
It is located 17 miles south of the county seat of Fort Dodge, 2.65 miles south and one mile west of Harcourt (on U.S. Route 169), and 3.3 miles north and 4.5 miles west of Boxholm. Lanyon consists of seven blocks, bounded on the north by 390th Street, and on the east by Lanyon Avenue.

== History ==
The community was founded by Swedish emigrants, part of a migration from Knox County, Illinois in the 1860s. The population was 105 in 1940.

It is located on the diagonal route of a former interurban railroad between Boone and Rockwell City, which was used by the Fort Dodge, Des Moines and Southern Railroad until the 1960s. A station at Layton was opened in 1899 to serve a railway laid that year by the Marshalltown and Dakota Railroad Company to carry coal mined near Fraser northwest to connections at Gowrie. A Lanyon Post Office was established in 1900, the Lanyon Mutual Telephone Company was established in 1903, and the Bank of Lanyon, Lanyon Well Company, and (until the early 1960s) Lanyon Consolidated School. Lanyon is now within the Prairie Valley Community School District.

It includes the Evangelical Covenant Church, founded in 1877 and located in Lanyon since 1909.

== Education ==
Previously it was in the Prairie Valley Community School District, which formed on July 1, 1993 with the merger of the Cedar Valley Community School District and the Prairie Community School District. Prairie Valley CSD merged into the Southeast Valley Community School District in 2023. This district includes the Southeast Valley Middle School in Burnside and Southeast Valley High School in Gowrie.

== Notable people ==
- George E. Q. Johnson, United States attorney who successfully prosecuted Al Capone for tax evasion
- Obed Simon Johnson, author of "A Study of Chinese Alchemy".
- Jon Lindgren, mayor of Fargo, North Dakota from 1978 to 1994
