= Sherwood, Iowa =

- Unincorporated community
- Location within Iowa
- Country: United States
- State: Iowa
- County: Calhoun
- Elevation: 1,227 ft (374 m)
- Time zone: UTC-6 (Central (CST))
  - Summer (DST): UTC-5 (CDT)
- Area code: 712
- GNIS feature ID: 464744

Sherwood is an unincorporated community in Calhoun County, Iowa, in the United States.

== History ==
Sherwood was originally called Mosely, and under the latter name was platted in 1899. It was later renamed Sherwood when the post office was established. The population was 29 in 1940.
