= Prairie Valley Community School District =

Public school district in Gowrie, Iowa, United States

Coordinates: 42.281742°N 94.289019°W

Location
- Gowrie, Iowa Calhoun, Webster, and Greene counties United States
- Coordinates: 42.281742, -94.289019

District information
- Type: Local school district
- Grades: K-12
- Established: 1993
- Closed: 2023
- Superintendent: Brian Johnson
- Schools: 2
- Budget: $9,863,000 (2017-18)
- NCES District ID: 1900028

Students and staff
- Students: 551 (2019-20)
- Teachers: 38.73 FTE
- Staff: 53.40 FTE
- Student–teacher ratio: 14.23
- Athletic conference: Twin Lakes
- District mascot: Jaguars
- Colors: Teal, Silver, and Black

Other information
- Website: www.southeastvalley.org

Prairie Valley Community School District was a rural public K-12 school district with a district seat in Gowrie, Iowa.

The district was located in portions of Calhoun and Webster counties, as well as a small portion of Greene County. It served Gowrie, Callender, Farnhamville, Moorland, Rinard, and Somers. Additionally, the district included the unincorporated areas of Lanyon and Slifer.

In 2023 the district merged into the Southeast Valley Community School District.

== History ==
The district formed on July 1, 1993, with the merger of the Cedar Valley Community School District and the Prairie Community School District.

In August 2014, the district began a whole grade-sharing arrangement with the Southeast Webster-Grand Community School District as a way to deal with smaller enrollments and as a way to save money. The two districts together share middle and high schools.

In March 2022 voters agreed to consolidate Prairie Valley with Southeast Webster-Grand to form Southeast Valley Community School District, effective fall 2023. On July 1, 2023, the merger occurred.

== Schools ==
- Southeast Valley High School served as the high school for the two districts.
- Southeast Webster-Grand Southeast Valley Middle School, Burnside (jointly with Southeast Webster-Grand Community School District)
- Prairie Valley Elementary School, Farnhamville

Prior to the grade sharing, the Prairie Valley district had two schools: The elementary served pre-kindergarten through 6th grade and is located between Farnhamville and Somers. The Prairie Valley High School served 7th grade through 12th grade and was located in Gowrie.

== See also ==
- List of school districts in Iowa
