= Jackson Township, Calhoun County, Iowa =

Township in Iowa, US

Jackson Township, Calhoun County
- Township
- Coordinates: 42°15′12″N 094°48′17″W
- Country: United States
- State: Iowa
- County: Calhoun

Area
  - Total: 33.73 sq mi (87.36 km^{2})
  - Land: 33.28 sq mi (86.19 km^{2})
  - Water: 0.45 sq mi (1.17 km^{2})
- Elevation: 1,099 ft (335 m)

Population (2000)
  - Total: 225
  - Density: 6.7/sq mi (2.6/km^{2})
- FIPS code: 19-92103
- GNIS feature ID: 0468095

Jackson Township is one of sixteen townships in Calhoun County, Iowa, United States. As of the 2000 census, its population was 225.

== History ==
Jackson Township was created in 1866. It is named for Andrew Jackson, seventh President of the United States.

== Geography ==
Jackson Township covers an area of 33.73 square miles (87.4 km^{2}) and contains no incorporated settlements. According to the USGS, it contains one cemetery, Cottonwood.
