= Calhoun Township, Calhoun County, Iowa =

Township in Iowa, US

Calhoun Township, Calhoun County
- Township
- Coordinates: 42°14′41″N 094°40′58″W
- Country: United States
- State: Iowa
- County: Calhoun

Area
  - Total: 31.58 sq mi (81.79 km^{2})
  - Land: 31.57 sq mi (81.77 km^{2})
  - Water: 0.0077 sq mi (0.02 km^{2})
- Elevation: 1,210 ft (370 m)

Population (2000)
  - Total: 166
  - Density: 5.2/sq mi (2/km^{2})
- FIPS code: 19-90441
- GNIS feature ID: 0467520

Calhoun Township is one of sixteen townships in Calhoun County, Iowa, United States. As of the 2000 census, its population was 166.

== History ==
Calhoun Township was the first township created in 1856. It originally included the entire county.

== Geography ==
Calhoun Township covers an area of 31.58 square miles (81.8 km^{2}) and contains no incorporated settlements. According to the USGS, it contains one cemetery, Bishop.
