= Easley, Iowa =

- Unincorporated community
- Location within Iowa
- Country: United States
- State: Iowa
- County: Calhoun
- Elevation: 1,145 ft (349 m)
- Time zone: UTC-6 (Central (CST))
  - Summer (DST): UTC-5 (CDT)
- Area code: 712
- GNIS feature ID: 464125

Easley is an unincorporated community in Calhoun County, Iowa, in the United States.

== History ==
Easley was a station on the Fort Dodge, Des Moines & Southern Railroad. The population was 3 in 1940.
