= Lanesboro, Iowa =

- City
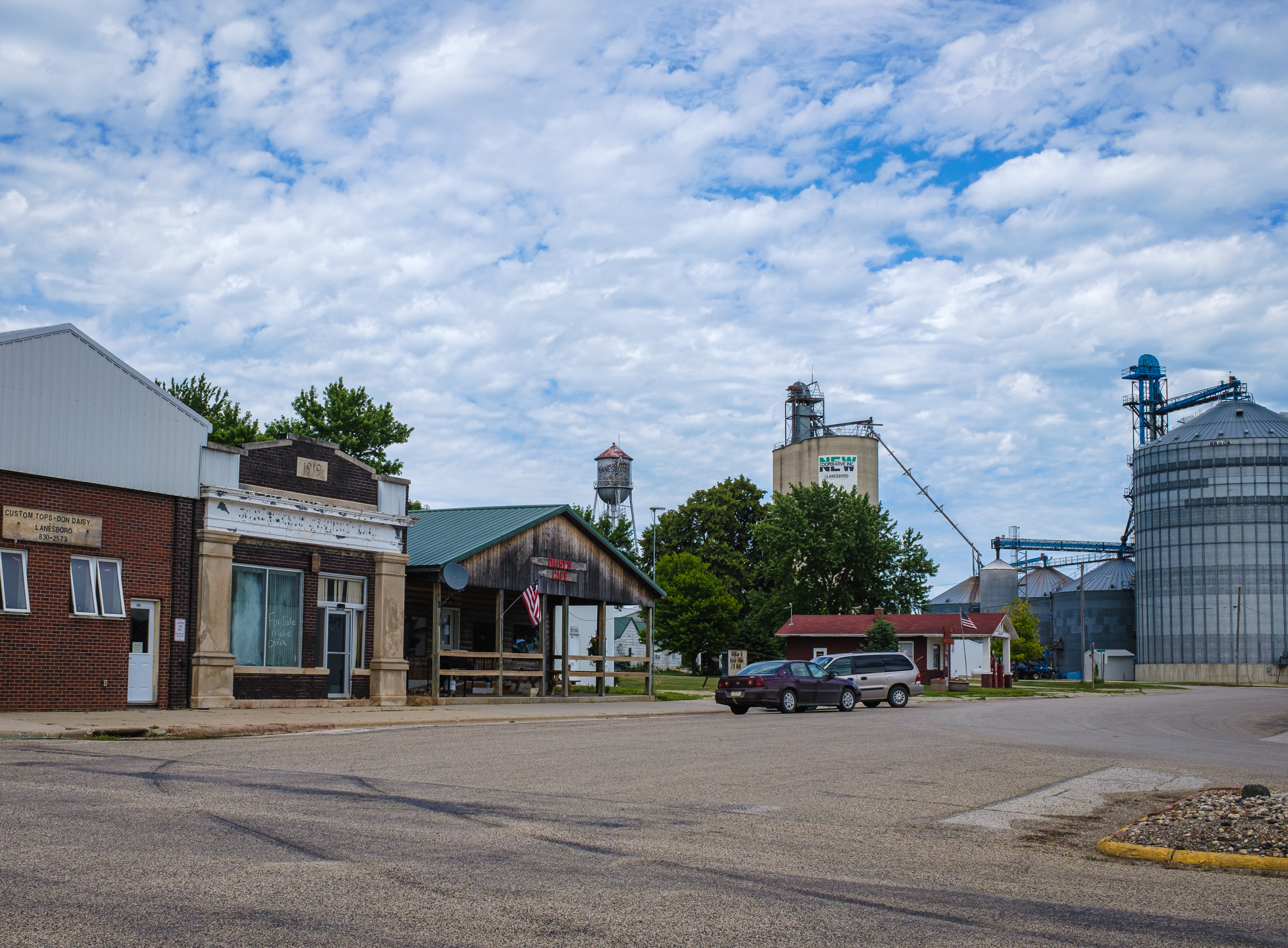
- Main Street

- Location of Lanesboro, Iowa
- Coordinates: 42°10′58″N 94°41′32″W
- Country: USA
- State: Iowa
- County: Carroll

Area
  - Total: 0.75 sq mi (1.95 km^{2})
  - Land: 0.75 sq mi (1.93 km^{2})
  - Water: 0.012 sq mi (0.03 km^{2})
- Elevation: 1,139 ft (347 m)

Population (2020)
  - Total: 119
  - Density: 160.1/sq mi (61.81/km^{2})
- Time zone: UTC-6 (Central (CST))
  - Summer (DST): UTC-5 (CDT)
- ZIP code: 51451
- Area code: 712
- FIPS code: 19-43140
- GNIS feature ID: 2395629

Lanesboro is a city in Carroll County, Iowa, United States. The population was 119 at the time of the 2020 census.

== History ==
Lanesboro got its start in the year 1901, following construction of the Mason City and Fort Dodge Railroad through that territory. It was named for Julius Lane, an early settler.

== Geography ==
According to the United States Census Bureau, the city has a total area of 0.75 square miles (1.94 km^{2}), of which 0.74 square miles (1.92 km^{2}) is land and 0.01 square miles (0.03 km^{2}) is water.

== Demographics ==
Historical populations
| Year | Pop. | ±% |
|---|---|---|
| 1910 | 268 | — |
| 1920 | 282 | +5.2% |
| 1930 | 270 | −4.3% |
| 1940 | 289 | +7.0% |
| 1950 | 280 | −3.1% |
| 1960 | 258 | −7.9% |
| 1970 | 203 | −21.3% |
| 1980 | 196 | −3.4% |
| 1990 | 182 | −7.1% |
| 2000 | 152 | −16.5% |
| 2010 | 121 | −20.4% |
| 2020 | 119 | −1.7% |
Source:"U.S. Census website". United States Census Bureau. and Iowa Data Center; Source: U.S. Decennial Census

=== 2020 census ===
As of the census of 2020, there were 119 people, 56 households, and 27 families residing in the city. The population density was 160.1 inhabitants per square mile (61.8/km^{2}). There were 68 housing units at an average density of 91.5 per square mile (35.3/km^{2}). The racial makeup of the city was 93.3% White, 0.0% Black or African American, 0.0% Native American, 0.0% Asian, 0.0% Pacific Islander, 3.4% from other races and 3.4% from two or more races. Hispanic or Latino persons of any race comprised 1.7% of the population.

Of the 56 households, 21.4% of which had children under the age of 18 living with them, 39.3% were married couples living together, 10.7% were cohabitating couples, 21.4% had a female householder with no spouse or partner present and 28.6% had a male householder with no spouse or partner present. 51.8% of all households were non-families. 39.3% of all households were made up of individuals, 16.1% had someone living alone who was 65 years old or older.

The median age in the city was 51.5 years. 16.8% of the residents were under the age of 20; 5.0% were between the ages of 20 and 24; 19.3% were from 25 and 44; 28.6% were from 45 and 64; and 30.3% were 65 years of age or older. The gender makeup of the city was 54.6% male and 45.4% female.

=== 2010 census ===
At the 2010 census there were 121 people in 62 households, including 33 families, in the city. The population density was 163.5 inhabitants per square mile (63.1/km^{2}). There were 74 housing units at an average density of 100.0 per square mile (38.6/km^{2}). The racial makup of the city was 95.9% White, 0.8% African American, 0.8% Asian, and 2.5% from two or more races. Hispanic or Latino of any race were 3.3%.

Of the 62 households 17.7% had children under the age of 18 living with them, 48.4% were married couples living together, 4.8% had a female householder with no husband present, and 46.8% were non-families. 37.1% of households were one person and 9.7% were one person aged 65 or older. The average household size was 1.95 and the average family size was 2.61.

The median age was 50.8 years. 15.7% of residents were under the age of 18; 7.4% were between the ages of 18 and 24; 15.8% were from 25 to 44; 43% were from 45 to 64; and 18.2% were 65 or older. The gender makeup of the city was 52.9% male and 47.1% female.

=== 2000 census ===
At the 2000 census there were 152 people in 71 households, including 42 families, in the city. The population density was 204.5 inhabitants per square mile (79.0/km^{2}). There were 77 housing units at an average density of 103.6 per square mile (40.0/km^{2}). The racial makup of the city was 98.68% White, 0.66% from other races, and 0.66% from two or more races. Hispanic or Latino of any race were 0.66%.

Of the 71 households 23.9% had children under the age of 18 living with them, 53.5% were married couples living together, 2.8% had a female householder with no husband present, and 40.8% were non-families. 36.6% of households were one person and 16.9% were one person aged 65 or older. The average household size was 2.14 and the average family size was 2.83.

The age distribution was 19.7% under the age of 18, 7.2% from 18 to 24, 27.0% from 25 to 44, 27.6% from 45 to 64, and 18.4% 65 or older. The median age was 43 years. For every 100 females, there were 120.3 males. For every 100 females age 18 and over, there were 117.9 males.

The median household income was $25,750 and the median family income was $31,250. Males had a median income of $30,000 versus $20,625 for females. The per capita income for the city was $15,397. About 5.9% of families and 10.8% of the population were below the poverty line, including none of those under the age of eighteen and 17.6% of those sixty five or over.

== Education ==
Much of Lanesboro is within the South Central Calhoun Community School District. That section was once a part of the Southern Cal Community School District, formed on July 1, 1993. The Southern Cal district merged into South Central Calhoun on July 1, 2014.
