= Yetter, Iowa =

- City
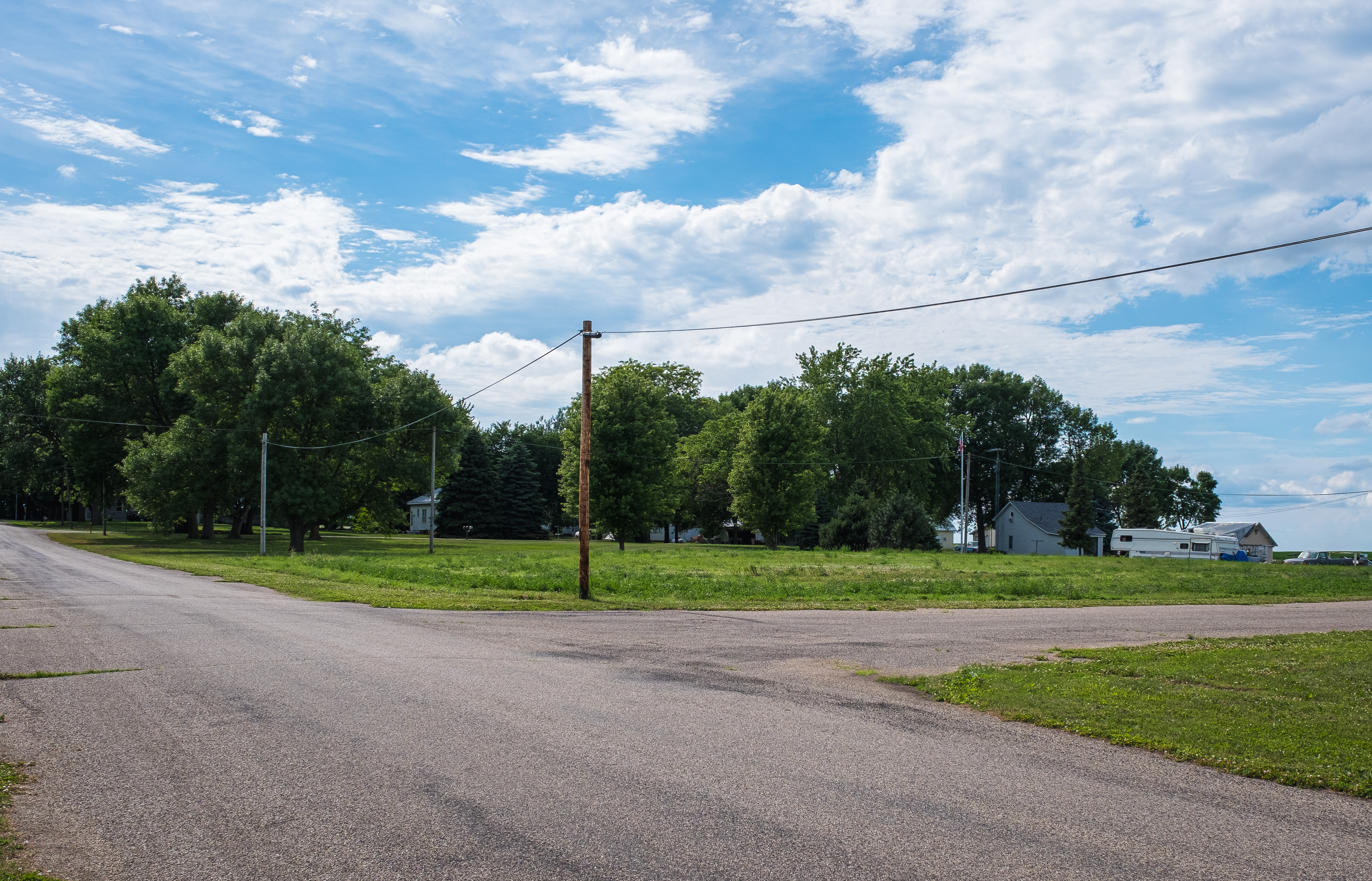
- Entering the town
- Motto: Everything's Better in Yetter
- Location of Yetter, Iowa
- Coordinates: 42°18′58″N 94°50′36″W
- Country: USA
- State: Iowa
- County: Calhoun

Area
  - Total: 0.13 sq mi (0.33 km^{2})
  - Land: 0.13 sq mi (0.33 km^{2})
  - Water: 0 sq mi (0.00 km^{2})
- Elevation: 1,214 ft (370 m)

Population (2020)
  - Total: 19
  - Density: 148.6/sq mi (57.38/km^{2})
- Time zone: UTC-6 (Central (CST))
  - Summer (DST): UTC-5 (CDT)
- ZIP code: 51433
- Area code: 712
- FIPS code: 19-87375
- GNIS feature ID: 2397391

Yetter is a city in Calhoun County, Iowa, United States. The population was 19 at the time of the 2020 census.

== History ==
Yetter was platted in 1899. It was named for its founder, L. M. Yetter.

== Geography ==
According to the United States Census Bureau, the city has a total area of 0.13 square miles (0.34 km^{2}), all land.

== Demographics ==
Historical populations
Year	Pop.	±%
1910	107	—
1920	125	+16.8%
1930	114	−8.8%
1940	135	+18.4%
1950	121	−10.4%
1960	85	−29.8%
1970	52	−38.8%
1980	52	+0.0%
1990	49	−5.8%
2000	36	−26.5%
2010	34	−5.6%
2020	19	−44.1%
Source:"U.S. Census website". United States Census Bureau. and Iowa Data Center; Source: U.S. Decennial Census

=== 2020 census ===
As of the 2020 census, the total population was 19 people. The population density was 146 people per square mile, spread over 0.13 miles. Of those 19 people, the median age was 55.3 years, with 22% of the town's population under the age of 18, 58.5% between the ages of 18 and 64, and 19.5% of the population over the age of 65. There were a total of 19 households, with an average of one person per household.

54% of the town's population was female, with 46% of the population male. The racial makeup of the town was 100% White. Of those 19 people, 4.9% were of English descent, 65.9% German, and 36.6% Irish.

The average income per capita of Yetter was $19,271, which is far lower than the state average, and the median household income was $19,271, almost 66% lower than the rest of the state. 43.9% of the town's population lives under the poverty line, which is far lower than the rest of the state.

42.1% of the population of the town is identified as currently married.

88% of the Yetter population has received a high school degree, which is 4.5 percentage points lower than the rest of the state. The town falls far below the state average of bachelor's degrees with only 4% of the town's population having received a bachelor's degree.

15.6% of the town's population were veterans.

=== 2010 census ===
As of the 2010 census, there were 34 people, 16 households, and 9 families living in the city. The population density was 261.5 inhabitants per square mile (101.0/km^{2}). There were 20 housing units at an average density of 153.8 per square mile (59.4/km^{2}). The racial makeup of the city was 97.1% White and 2.9% Asian.

There were 16 households, of which 25.0% had children under the age of 18 living with them, 43.8% were married couples living together, 12.5% had a male householder with no wife present, and 43.8% were non-families. 43.8% of all households were made up of individuals, and 25.1% had someone living alone who was 65 years of age or older. The average household size was 2.13 and the average family size was 3.00.

The median age in the city was 49.5 years. 20.6% of residents were under the age of 18; 2.8% were between the ages of 18 and 24; 20.5% were from 25 to 44; 38.2% were from 45 to 64; and 17.6% were 65 years of age or older. The gender makeup of the city was 61.8% male and 38.2% female.

=== 2000 census ===
As of the 2000 census, there were 36 people, 18 households, and 9 families living in the city. The population density was 292.7 inhabitants per square mile (113.0/km^{2}). There were 20 housing units at an average density of 162.6 per square mile (62.8/km^{2}). The racial makeup of the city was 100.00% White.

There were 18 households, out of which 22.2% had children under the age of 18 living with them, 33.3% were married couples living together, 11.1% had a female householder with no husband present, and 50.0% were non-families. 44.4% of all households were made up of individuals, and 27.8% had someone living alone who was 65 years of age or older. The average household size was 2.00 and the average family size was 2.78.

19.4% are under the age of 18, 2.8% from 18 to 24, 30.6% from 25 to 44, 25.0% from 45 to 64, and 22.2% who were 65 years of age or older. The median age was 44 years. For every 100 females, there were 125.0 males. For every 100 females age 18 and over, there were 123.1 males.

The median income for a household in the city was $45,938, and the median income for a family was $46,250. Males had a median income of $28,500 versus $11,563 for females. The per capita income for the city was $21,675. None of the population and none of the families were below the poverty line.

== Education ==
Yetter is within the South Central Calhoun Community School District. It was once a part of the Southern Cal Community School District, formed on July 1, 1993. The Southern Cal district merged into South Central Calhoun on July 1, 2014.
