= Farnhamville, Iowa =

- City
- Location of Farnhamville, Iowa
- Coordinates: 42°16′36″N 94°24′28″W
- Country: US
- State: Iowa
- Counties: Calhoun, Webster

Area
  - Total: 0.66 sq mi (1.72 km^{2})
  - Land: 0.66 sq mi (1.71 km^{2})
  - Water: 0.0077 sq mi (0.02 km^{2})
- Elevation: 1,132 ft (345 m)

Population (2020)
  - Total: 383
  - Density: 581.4/sq mi (224.48/km^{2})
- Time zone: UTC-6 (Central (CST))
  - Summer (DST): UTC-5 (CDT)
- ZIP code: 50538
- Area code: 515
- FIPS code: 19-26940
- GNIS feature ID: 2394750

Farnhamville is a city in Calhoun and Webster counties in the U.S. state of Iowa. The population was 383 at the time of the 2020 census.

== History ==
Farnhamville was platted in 1881 under the name Farnham, named in honor of R. E. Farnham, a railroad official. Postal authorities refused to accept the name Farnham, so town was renamed Farnhamville when the post office opened later in 1881. Farnhamville was incorporated as a city in 1892.

== Geography ==
According to the United States Census Bureau, the city has a total area of 0.66 square miles (1.71 km^{2}), of which 0.65 square miles (1.68 km^{2}) is land and 0.01 square miles (0.03 km^{2}) is water.

== Demographics ==
Historical populations
Year	Pop.	±%
1890	137	—
1900	348	+154.0%
1910	332	−4.6%
1920	380	+14.5%
1930	365	−3.9%
1940	425	+16.4%
1950	399	−6.1%
1960	409	+2.5%
1970	393	−3.9%
1980	461	+17.3%
1990	414	−10.2%
2000	430	+3.9%
2010	371	−13.7%
2020	383	+3.2%
Source:"U.S. Census website". United States Census Bureau. and Iowa Data Center; Source: U.S. Decennial Census

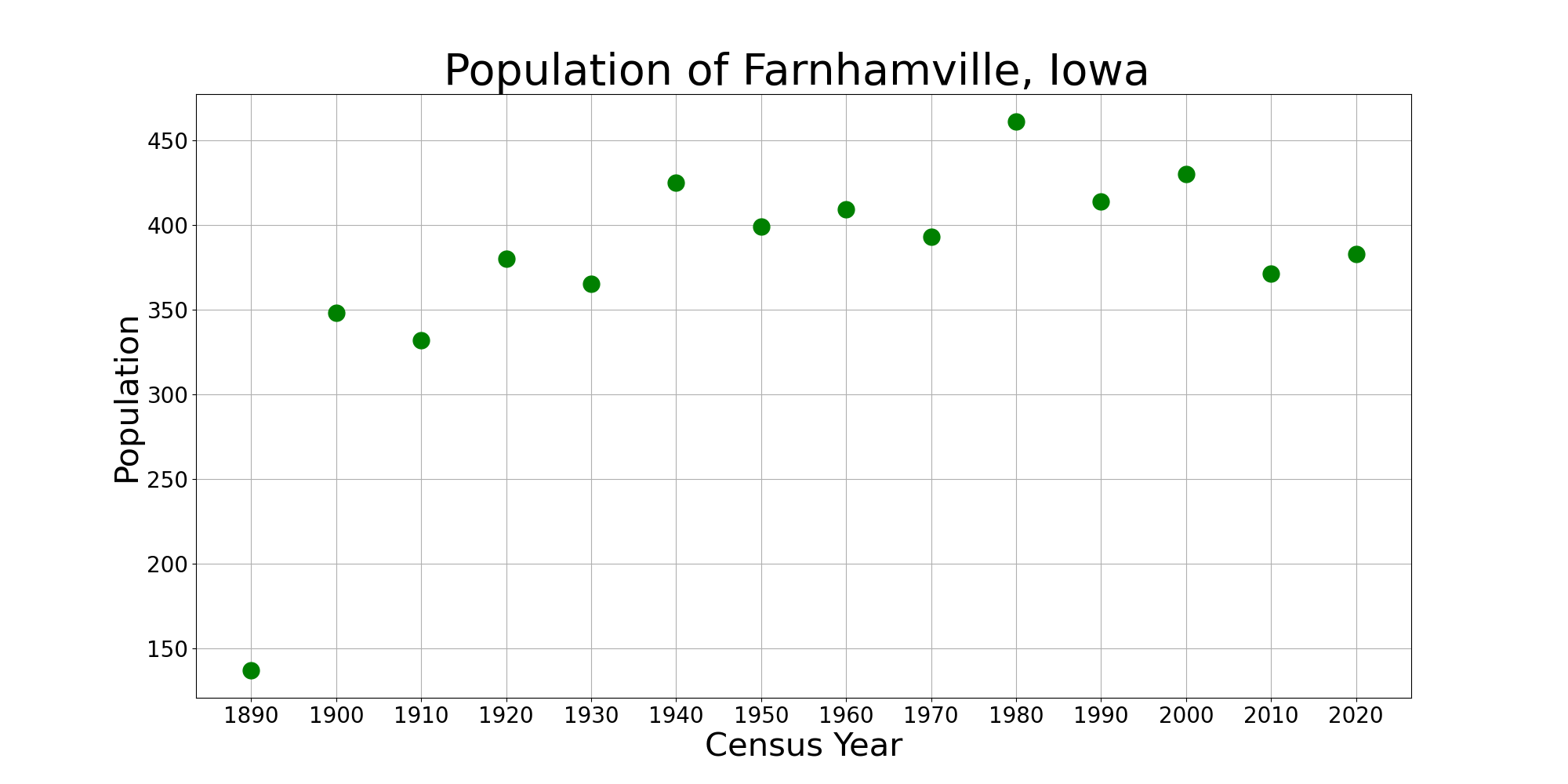
The population of Farnhamville, Iowa from US census data

=== 2020 census ===
As of the census of 2020, there were 383 people, 172 households, and 100 families residing in the city. The population density was 581.4 inhabitants per square mile (224.5/km^{2}). There were 191 housing units at an average density of 289.9 per square mile (111.9/km^{2}). The racial makeup of the city was 89.0% White, 2.1% Black or African American, 0.8% Native American, 0.0% Asian, 1.6% Pacific Islander, 1.0% from other races and 5.5% from two or more races. Hispanic or Latino persons of any race comprised 1.3% of the population.

Of the 172 households, 26.7% of which had children under the age of 18 living with them, 42.4% were married couples living together, 5.2% were cohabitating couples, 27.3% had a female householder with no spouse or partner present and 25.0% had a male householder with no spouse or partner present. 41.9% of all households were non-families. 35.5% of all households were made up of individuals, 19.8% had someone living alone who was 65 years old or older.

The median age in the city was 39.9 years. 27.2% of the residents were under the age of 20; 4.2% were between the ages of 20 and 24; 23.5% were from 25 and 44; 24.8% were from 45 and 64; and 20.4% were 65 years of age or older. The gender makeup of the city was 50.9% male and 49.1% female.

=== 2010 census ===
As of the census of 2010, there were 371 people, 180 households, and 111 families living in the city. The population density was 570.8 inhabitants per square mile (220.4/km^{2}). There were 201 housing units at an average density of 309.2 per square mile (119.4/km^{2}). The racial makeup of the city was 98.4% White, 0.3% Native American, 0.3% Asian, 0.3% Pacific Islander, and 0.8% from two or more races.

There were 180 households, of which 23.9% had children under the age of 18 living with them, 46.1% were married couples living together, 8.3% had a female householder with no husband present, 7.2% had a male householder with no wife present, and 38.3% were non-families. 34.4% of all households were made up of individuals, and 18.9% had someone living alone who was 65 years of age or older. The average household size was 2.06 and the average family size was 2.53.

The median age in the city was 46.8 years. 18.6% of residents were under the age of 18; 8.9% were between the ages of 18 and 24; 20.8% were from 25 to 44; 27.5% were from 45 to 64; and 24.3% were 65 years of age or older. The gender makeup of the city was 46.4% male and 53.6% female.

=== 2000 census ===
As of the census of 2000, there were 430 people, 195 households, and 130 families living in the city. The population density was 659.6 inhabitants per square mile (254.7/km^{2}). There were 213 housing units at an average density of 326.7 per square mile (126.1/km^{2}). The racial makeup of the city was 98.14% White, 0.70% Native American, 0.47% from other races, and 0.70% from two or more races. Hispanic or Latino of any race were 0.70% of the population.

There were 195 households, out of which 26.7% had children under the age of 18 living with them, 54.9% were married couples living together, 9.2% had a female householder with no husband present, and 33.3% were non-families. 30.8% of all households were made up of individuals, and 23.6% had someone living alone who was 65 years of age or older. The average household size was 2.21 and the average family size was 2.69.

Age spread: 23.0% under the age of 18, 7.7% from 18 to 24, 20.5% from 25 to 44, 23.3% from 45 to 64, and 25.6% who were 65 years of age or older. The median age was 44 years. For every 100 females, there were 86.1 males. For every 100 females age 18 and over, there were 87.0 males.

The median income for a household in the city was $29,107, and the median income for a family was $36,667. Males had a median income of $27,237 versus $22,813 for females. The per capita income for the city was $21,619. About 7.1% of families and 10.0% of the population were below the poverty line, including 11.2% of those under age 18 and 15.7% of those age 65 or over.

== Education ==
It is in the Southeast Valley Community School District. The district operates Farnhamville Elementary School near, but not in, Farnhamville. The campus was previously known as Prairie Valley Elementary School. The district also operates Southeast Valley Middle School in Burnside, and Southeast Valley High School in Gowrie.

Farnhamville was formerly served by the Prairie Valley Community School District, which formed on July 1, 1993, with the merger of the Cedar Valley Community School District and the Prairie Community School District. In 2023 that district merged into the Southeast Valley district.
