= Knierim, Iowa =

- City
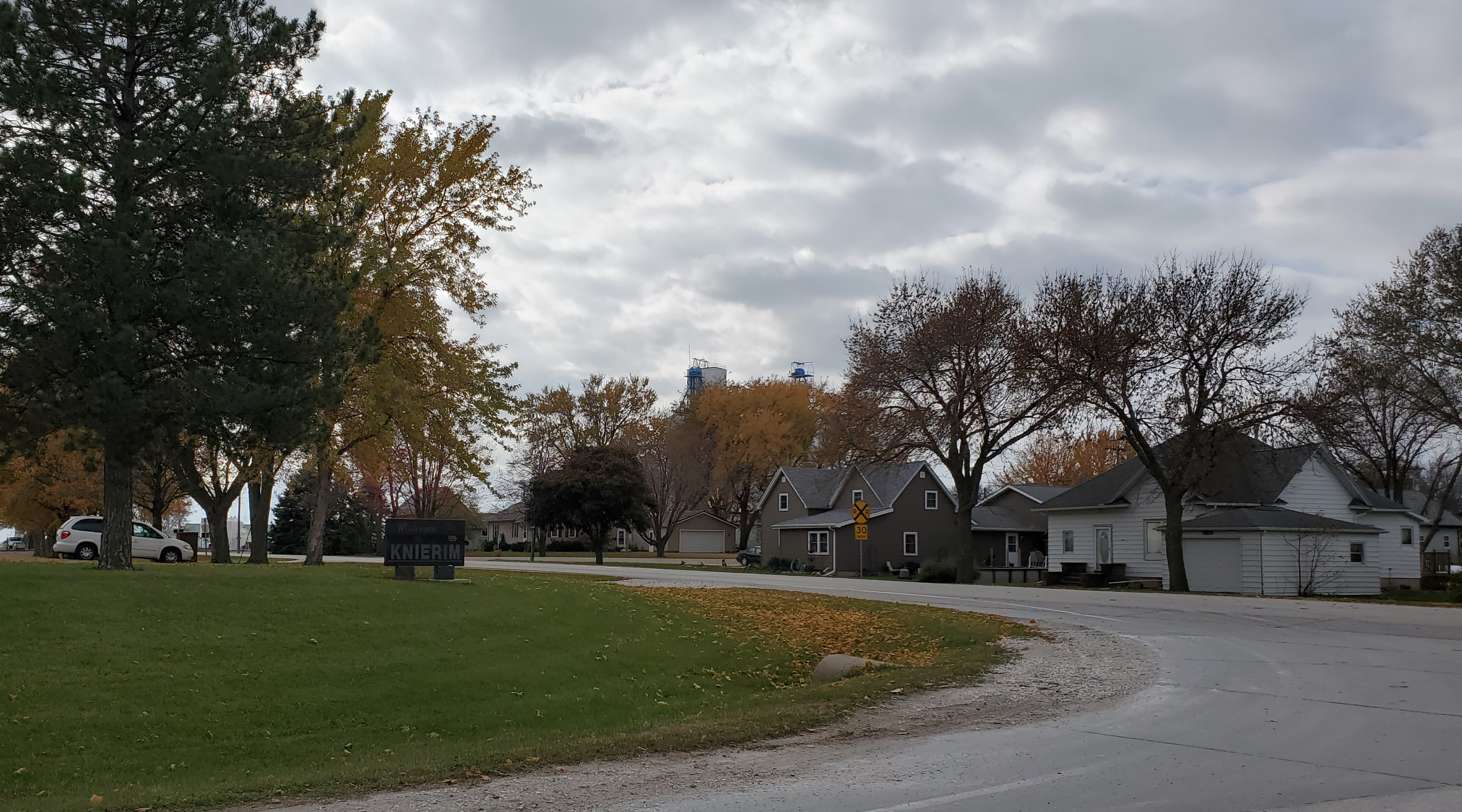
- Welcome sign in Knierim

- Location of Knierim, Iowa
- Coordinates: 42°27′23″N 94°27′21″W
- Country: United States
- State: Iowa
- County: Calhoun

Area
  - Total: 1.00 sq mi (2.58 km^{2})
  - Land: 1.00 sq mi (2.58 km^{2})
  - Water: 0 sq mi (0.00 km^{2})
- Elevation: 1,175 ft (358 m)

Population (2020)
  - Total: 53
  - Density: 53.3/sq mi (20.57/km^{2})
- Time zone: UTC-6 (Central (CST))
  - Summer (DST): UTC-5 (CDT)
- ZIP code: 50552
- Area code: 515
- FIPS code: 19-41790
- GNIS feature ID: 2395554

Knierim is a city in Calhoun County, Iowa, United States. The population was 53 at the time of the 2020 census.

== History ==
The city was founded by William and Wilhelmina Knierim in 1899, and incorporated in 1901.

== Geography ==
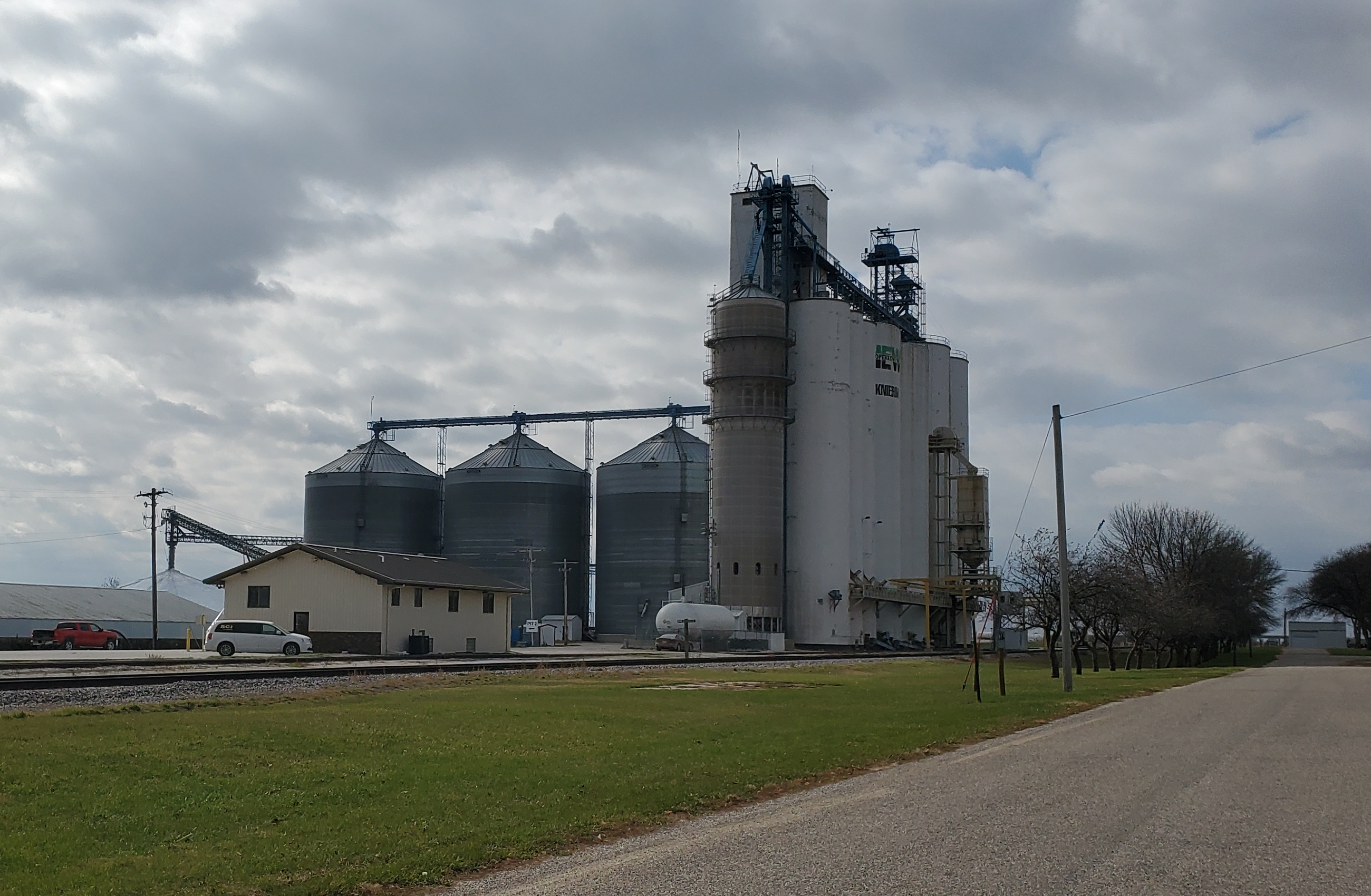
NEW (North East Webster) Cooperative facility in Knierim

According to the United States Census Bureau, the city has a total area of 1.01 square miles (2.62 km^{2}), all land.

Knierim lies at the southeastern margin (rim) of Manson crater, an impact structure buried by glacial till and outwash.

== Demographics ==
Historical populations
Year	Pop.	±%
1910	220	—
1920	173	−21.4%
1930	121	−30.1%
1940	159	+31.4%
1950	133	−16.4%
1960	153	+15.0%
1970	131	−14.4%
1980	125	−4.6%
1990	71	−43.2%
2000	70	−1.4%
2010	60	−14.3%
2020	53	−11.7%
Source:"U.S. Census website". United States Census Bureau. and Iowa Data Center; Source: U.S. Decennial Census

=== 2020 census ===
As of the census of 2020, there were 53 people, 23 households, and 11 families residing in the city. The population density was 53.3 inhabitants per square mile (20.6/km^{2}). There were 28 housing units at an average density of 28.1 per square mile (10.9/km^{2}). The racial makeup of the city was 100.0% White, 0.0% Black or African American, 0.0% Native American, 0.0% Asian, 0.0% Pacific Islander, 0.0% from other races and 0.0% from two or more races. Hispanic or Latino persons of any race comprised 0.0% of the population.

Of the 23 households, 34.8% of which had children under the age of 18 living with them, 43.5% were married couples living together, 0.0% were cohabitating couples, 17.4% had a female householder with no spouse or partner present and 39.1% had a male householder with no spouse or partner present. 52.2% of all households were non-families. 52.2% of all households were made up of individuals, 30.4% had someone living alone who was 65 years old or older.

The median age in the city was 44.5 years. 30.2% of the residents were under the age of 20; 0.0% were between the ages of 20 and 24; 20.8% were from 25 and 44; 30.2% were from 45 and 64; and 18.9% were 65 years of age or older. The gender makeup of the city was 56.6% male and 43.4% female.

=== 2010 census ===
As of the census of 2010, there were 60 people, 25 households, and 17 families living in the city. The population density was 59.4 inhabitants per square mile (22.9/km^{2}). There were 28 housing units at an average density of 27.7 per square mile (10.7/km^{2}). The racial makeup of the city was 96.7% White, 1.7% from other races, and 1.7% from two or more races. Hispanic or Latino of any race were 5.0% of the population.

There were 25 households, of which 36.0% had children under the age of 18 living with them, 64.0% were married couples living together, 4.0% had a male householder with no wife present, and 32.0% were non-families. 32.0% of all households were made up of individuals, and 20% had someone living alone who was 65 years of age or older. The average household size was 2.40 and the average family size was 3.06.

The median age in the city was 37.5 years. 31.7% of residents were under the age of 18; 0.0% were between the ages of 18 and 24; 28.3% were from 25 to 44; 23.4% were from 45 to 64; and 16.7% were 65 years of age or older. The gender makeup of the city was 53.3% male and 46.7% female.

=== 2000 census ===
As of the census of 2000, there were 70 people, 34 households, and 19 families living in the city. The population density was 69.5 inhabitants per square mile (26.8/km^{2}). There were 35 housing units at an average density of 34.8 per square mile (13.4/km^{2}). The racial makeup of the city was 100.00% White.

There were 34 households, out of which 17.6% had children under the age of 18 living with them, 52.9% were married couples living together, 2.9% had a female householder with no husband present, and 44.1% were non-families. 35.3% of all households were made up of individuals, and 14.7% had someone living alone who was 65 years of age or older. The average household size was 2.06 and the average family size was 2.68.

In the city, the population was spread out, with 20.0% under the age of 18, 5.7% from 18 to 24, 30.0% from 25 to 44, 18.6% from 45 to 64, and 25.7% who were 65 years of age or older. The median age was 40 years. For every 100 females, there were 100.0 males. For every 100 females age 18 and over, there were 107.4 males.

The median income for a household in the city was $26,667, and the median income for a family was $41,528. Males had a median income of $19,500 versus $28,333 for females. The per capita income for the city was $20,280. There were no families and 11.0% of the population living below the poverty line, including no under eighteens and none of those over 64.

== Education ==
The Manson–Northwest Webster Community School District serves the community. It was established on July 1, 1993, with the merger of the Manson and Northwest Webster districts.
