= Lohrville, Iowa =

- City
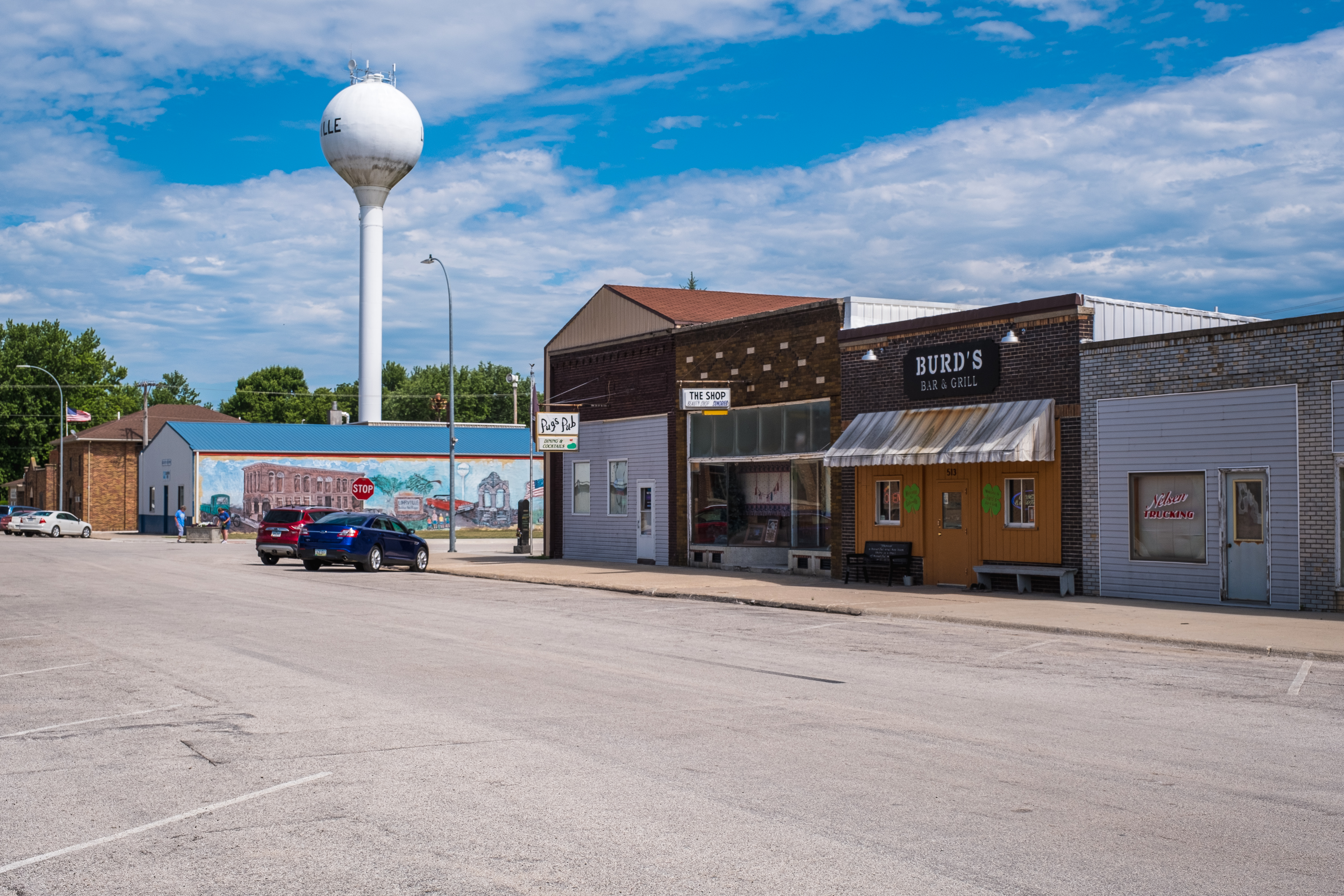
- 2nd Street in Lohrville
- Motto: Lohrville Iowa Better Not Bigger
- Location of Lohrville, Iowa
- Coordinates: 42°16′01″N 94°33′06″W
- Country: USA
- State: Iowa
- County: Calhoun

Area
  - Total: 2.25 sq mi (5.83 km^{2})
  - Land: 2.25 sq mi (5.83 km^{2})
  - Water: 0 sq mi (0.00 km^{2})
- Elevation: 1,158 ft (353 m)

Population (2020)
  - Total: 381
  - Density: 169/sq mi (65.3/km^{2})
- Time zone: UTC-6 (Central (CST))
  - Summer (DST): UTC-5 (CDT)
- ZIP code: 51453
- Area code: 712
- FIPS code: 19-46245
- GNIS feature ID: 2395748

Lohrville is a city in Calhoun County, Iowa, United States. The population was 381 at the time of the 2020 census.

In 2014 the Carroll Daily Times Herald stated that Lohrville had "embraced its status as a bedroom community" to nearby cities.

== History ==
Lohrville was platted in 1881 when the railroad was extended to that point. It was named for Jacob A. Lohr, who owned the land where the town was laid out.

== Geography ==
According to the United States Census Bureau, the city has a total area of 2.14 square miles (5.54 km^{2}), all land.

Lohrville is located approximately 30 miles (48 km) from Fort Dodge and 30 miles (48 km) from Carroll.

== Demographics ==
Historical populations
Year	Pop.	±%
1890	435	—
1900	597	+37.2%
1910	674	+12.9%
1920	727	+7.9%
1930	776	+6.7%
1940	776	+0.0%
1950	698	−10.1%
1960	653	−6.4%
1970	553	−15.3%
1980	521	−5.8%
1990	453	−13.1%
2000	431	−4.9%
2010	368	−14.6%
2020	381	+3.5%
Source:"U.S. Census website". United States Census Bureau. and Iowa Data Center; Source: U.S. Decennial Census

=== 2020 census ===
As of the census of 2020, there were 381 people, 169 households, and 96 families residing in the city. The population density was 169.1 inhabitants per square mile (65.3/km^{2}). There were 182 housing units at an average density of 80.8 per square mile (31.2/km^{2}). The racial makeup of the city was 94.0% White, 0.0% Black or African American, 0.0% Native American, 0.3% Asian, 0.0% Pacific Islander, 2.6% from other races and 3.1% from two or more races. Hispanic or Latino persons of any race comprised 2.6% of the population.

Of the 169 households, 27.2% of which had children under the age of 18 living with them, 40.2% were married couples living together, 11.2% were cohabitating couples, 24.9% had a female householder with no spouse or partner present and 23.7% had a male householder with no spouse or partner present. 43.2% of all households were non-families. 38.5% of all households were made up of individuals, 17.8% had someone living alone who was 65 years old or older.

The median age in the city was 38.1 years. 31.2% of the residents were under the age of 20; 2.9% were between the ages of 20 and 24; 20.7% were from 25 and 44; 25.5% were from 45 and 64; and 19.7% were 65 years of age or older. The gender makeup of the city was 51.7% male and 48.3% female.

=== 2010 census ===
As of the census of 2010, there were 368 people, 167 households, and 95 families living in the city. The population density was 172.0 inhabitants per square mile (66.4/km^{2}). There were 194 housing units at an average density of 90.7 per square mile (35.0/km^{2}). The racial makeup of the city was 97.6% White, 0.5% Native American, 0.8% from other races, and 1.1% from two or more races. Hispanic or Latino of any race were 1.4% of the population.

There were 167 households, of which 25.1% had children under the age of 18 living with them, 41.9% were married couples living together, 9.0% had a female householder with no husband present, 6.0% had a male householder with no wife present, and 43.1% were non-families. 38.3% of all households were made up of individuals, and 17.4% had someone living alone who was 65 years of age or older. The average household size was 2.20 and the average family size was 2.92.

The median age in the city was 40.3 years. 24.5% of residents were under the age of 18; 7.8% were between the ages of 18 and 24; 23.1% were from 25 to 44; 26.5% were from 45 to 64; and 18.2% were 65 years of age or older. The gender makeup of the city was 50.3% male and 49.7% female.

=== 2000 census ===
As of the census of 2000, there were 431 people, 193 households, and 109 families living in the city. The population density was 109.8 inhabitants per square mile (42.4/km^{2}). There were 215 housing units at an average density of 54.8 per square mile (21.2/km^{2}). The racial makeup of the city was 99.30% White, 0.23% Native American, 0.23% Asian, 0.23% from other races. Hispanic or Latino of any race were 0.70% of the population.

There were 193 households, out of which 28.5% had children under the age of 18 living with them, 47.2% were married couples living together, 7.3% had a female householder with no husband present, and 43.5% were non-families. 38.9% of all households were made up of individuals, and 21.2% had someone living alone who was 65 years of age or older. The average household size was 2.23 and the average family size was 2.98.

In the city, the population was spread out, with 27.1% under the age of 18, 4.4% from 18 to 24, 25.3% from 25 to 44, 21.3% from 45 to 64, and 21.8% who were 65 years of age or older. The median age was 40 years. For every 100 females, there were 91.6 males. For every 100 females age 18 and over, there were 85.8 males.

The median income for a household in the city was $29,545, and the median income for a family was $45,208. Males had a median income of $27,308 versus $19,375 for females. The per capita income for the city was $15,655. About 9.3% of families and 12.1% of the population were below the poverty line, including 15.7% of those under age 18 and 6.9% of those age 65 or over.

== Education ==
Lohrville is within the South Central Calhoun Community School District. It was a part of the Lohrville Community School District until July 1, 1993, when it merged into the Southern Cal Community School District. The Southern Cal district subsequently merged into South Central Calhoun on July 1, 2014.

In 2012 the Southern Cal district closed the elementary school in Lohrville. The district board failed to find a suitable private buyer, the Lohrville community did not have enough funds to maintain the school, and there were already community and library buildings present. There were fears that if demolition were done later, it would cost more and that if a business acquired the lot, the building would be demolished anyway. In September 2013 the school district decided that the building should be demolished. In February 2014 the district took the bid of a demolition contractor to raze Lohrville School; it was to be demolished by July 2014.
