= Manson–Northwest Webster Community School District =

Public school district in Manson, Iowa, United States

Coordinates: 42.530073°N 94.534526°W

Location
- Manson, Iowa Webster, Calhoun, and Pocahontas counties United States
- Coordinates: 42.530073, -94.534526

District information
- Type: Local school district
- Grades: K–12
- Established: 1993
- Superintendent: Justin Daggett
- Schools: 2
- Budget: $11,492,000 (2020-21)
- NCES District ID: 1918330

Students and staff
- Students: 779 (2022-23)
- Teachers: 64.12 FTE
- Staff: 93.98 FTE
- Student–teacher ratio: 12.15
- Athletic conference: Twin Lakes
- District mascot: Cougars
- Colors: Dark blue, silver, and orange

Other information
- Website: www.manson-nw.k12.ia.us

Manson–Northwest Webster Community School District (MNW) is a rural public school district headquartered in Manson, Iowa. It operates an elementary school and a junior–senior high school; the former is in Barnum and the latter is in Manson. As of 2020 the schools respectively had 477 and 343 students.

It occupies sections of Webster, Calhoun, and Pocahontas counties. The district serves Manson, Barnum, Clare, and Knierim.

As of 2020, the district had about 820 students, with 477 in primary school and 343 in secondary school.

== History ==
It was established on July 1, 1993, with the merger of the Manson and Northwest Webster districts.

The district planned for a school bond election on September 8, 2018, for $8.8 million.

== Schools ==
The district operates two schools:

- Manson–Northwest Webster Elementary School (Pre-K through 6th grade), Barnum
- Manson–Northwest Webster High School (7th through 12th grade), Manson

=== Manson–Northwest Webster High School ===
==== Athletics ====
The Cougars compete in the Twin Lakes Conference in the following sports:

- Cross country
- Volleyball
- Football
- Basketball
- Wrestling
- Track and field
  - Boys' 2-time class 1A state champions (2012, 2013)
- Golf
- Baseball
- Softball

== See also ==
- List of school districts in Iowa
- List of high schools in Iowa
