= Rinard, Iowa =

- City
- Location of Rinard, Iowa
- Coordinates: 42°20′23″N 94°29′06″W
- Country: USA
- State: Iowa
- County: Calhoun

Area
  - Total: 1.00 sq mi (2.59 km^{2})
  - Land: 1.00 sq mi (2.59 km^{2})
  - Water: 0 sq mi (0.00 km^{2})
- Elevation: 1,168 ft (356 m)

Population (2020)
  - Total: 38
  - Density: 37.9/sq mi (14.65/km^{2})
- Time zone: UTC-6 (Central (CST))
  - Summer (DST): UTC-5 (CDT)
- ZIP code: 50538
- Area code: 515
- FIPS code: 19-67125
- GNIS feature ID: 2396377

Rinard is a city in Calhoun County, Iowa, United States. The population was 38 at the time of the 2020 census.

== History ==
Rinard was platted in 1904. The town soon became a key shipping point as it was located at the junction of the Chicago Great Western and the Fort Dodge, Des Moines & Southern railways.

== Geography ==
According to the United States Census Bureau, the city has a total area of 1.00 square mile (2.59 km^{2}), all land.

== Demographics ==
Historical populations
| Year | Pop. | ±% |
|---|---|---|
| 1920 | 160 | — |
| 1930 | 140 | −12.5% |
| 1940 | 143 | +2.1% |
| 1950 | 115 | −19.6% |
| 1960 | 99 | −13.9% |
| 1970 | 88 | −11.1% |
| 1980 | 97 | +10.2% |
| 1990 | 71 | −26.8% |
| 2000 | 72 | +1.4% |
| 2010 | 52 | −27.8% |
| 2020 | 38 | −26.9% |
Source:"U.S. Census website". United States Census Bureau. and Iowa Data Center; Source: U.S. Decennial Census

=== 2020 census ===
As of the census of 2020, there were 38 people, 18 households, and 9 families residing in the city. The population density was 37.9 inhabitants per square mile (14.7/km^{2}). There were 27 housing units at an average density of 27.0 per square mile (10.4/km^{2}). The racial makeup of the city was 92.1% White, 0.0% Black or African American, 0.0% Native American, 0.0% Asian, 0.0% Pacific Islander, 0.0% from other races and 7.9% from two or more races. Hispanic or Latino persons of any race comprised 0.0% of the population.

Of the 18 households, 16.7% of which had children under the age of 18 living with them, 38.9% were married couples living together, 0.0% were cohabitating couples, 16.7% had a female householder with no spouse or partner present and 44.4% had a male householder with no spouse or partner present. 50.0% of all households were non-families. 50.0% of all households were made up of individuals, 33.3% had someone living alone who was 65 years old or older.

The median age in the city was 57.5 years. 13.2% of the residents were under the age of 20; 2.6% were between the ages of 20 and 24; 18.4% were from 25 and 44; 31.6% were from 45 and 64; and 34.2% were 65 years of age or older. The gender makeup of the city was 57.9% male and 42.1% female.

=== 2010 census ===
At the 2010 census there were 52 people, 24 households, and 15 families living in the city. The population density was 52.0 inhabitants per square mile (20.1/km^{2}). There were 32 housing units at an average density of 32.0 per square mile (12.4/km^{2}). The racial makup of the city was 100.0% White. Of the 24 households 33.3% had children under the age of 18 living with them, 58.3% were married couples living together, 4.2% had a female householder with no husband present, and 37.5% were non-families. 37.5% of households were one person and 20.8% were one person aged 65 or older. The average household size was 2.17 and the average family size was 2.80.

The median age was 46 years. 23.1% of residents were under the age of 18; 1.8% were between the ages of 18 and 24; 23.1% were from 25 to 44; 34.6% were from 45 to 64; and 17.3% were 65 or older. The gender makeup of the city was 50.0% male and 50.0% female.

=== 2000 census ===
At the 2000 census there were 72 people, 28 households, and 18 families living in the city. The population density was 72.1 inhabitants per square mile (27.8/km^{2}). There were 31 housing units at an average density of 31.0 per square mile (12.0/km^{2}). The racial makup of the city was 100.00% White. Of the 28 households 39.3% had children under the age of 18 living with them, 60.7% were married couples living together, 3.6% had a female householder with no husband present, and 35.7% were non-families. 35.7% of households were one person and 14.3% were one person aged 65 or older. The average household size was 2.57 and the average family size was 3.39.

The age distribution was 33.3% under the age of 18, 2.8% from 18 to 24, 29.2% from 25 to 44, 20.8% from 45 to 64, and 13.9% 65 or older. The median age was 36 years. For every 100 females, there were 105.7 males. For every 100 females age 18 and over, there were 128.6 males.

The median household income was $16,875 and the median family income was $26,250. Males had a median income of $25,625 versus $13,125 for females. The per capita income for the city was $10,706. There were 26.7% of families and 27.4% of the population living below the poverty line, including 14.3% of under eighteens and 35.7% of those over 64.

== Education ==
It is in the Southeast Valley Community School District. Southeast Valley High School in Gowrie is that district's comprehensive high school.

Rinard was served by the Prairie Valley Community School District, which formed on July 1, 1993, with the merger of the Cedar Valley Community School District and the Prairie Community School District. In 2023 that district merged into the Southeast Valley district.
