= Southern Cal Community School District =

Defunct school district in Iowa, US

Southern Cal Community School District was a school district headquartered in Lake City, Iowa.

The district, with more than 230 square miles (600 km^{2}) of space, had sections in Calhoun, Carroll, Greene and Sac counties. In addition to Lake City it served Lohrville, Yetter, and much of Lanesboro.

== History ==
The district formed on July 1, 1993, from the merger of the Lake City City Community School District and the Lohrville Community School District.

In 1998, the district had 694 students; this declined by 28% to 499 in 2011.

In 2009, the Southern Cal district and the Rockwell City–Lytton Community School District decided to begin sharing athletic programs in the 2010–2011 school year and begin whole grade sharing, in which districts sent students to each other's schools, in the 2012–2013 school year. By 2011–2013, grades 5–12 were shared, and in 2012–2013 all grade levels became shared. On Tuesday, February 5, 2013, the districts held an election on whether they would consolidate. The vote to consolidate was successful, with a count 340–86 in Southern Calhoun and a 253–67 count in Rockwell City–Lytton; a total of 746 people voted. On July 1, 2014, the two districts merged to form the South Central Calhoun Community School District.

== Schools ==
The district had Lincoln Elementary School in Lake City, Lohrville Elementary School in Lohrville, and Southern Cal Middle/High School in Lake City.

In 2007, the district closed the Lincoln Elementary School building and later sold it for $22,000 to a private individual. In 2012 the Southern Cal district closed the elementary school in Lohrville. The district board failed to find a suitable private buyer, the Lohrville community did not have enough funds to maintain the school, and there were already community and library buildings present. There were fears that if demolition were done later, it would cost more, and that if a business acquired the lot, the building would be demolished anyway. In September 2013, the school district decided that the building should be demolished. In February 2014, the district took the bid of a demolition contractor to raze Lohrville School; it was to be demolished by July 2014.
