= Somers, Iowa =

- City
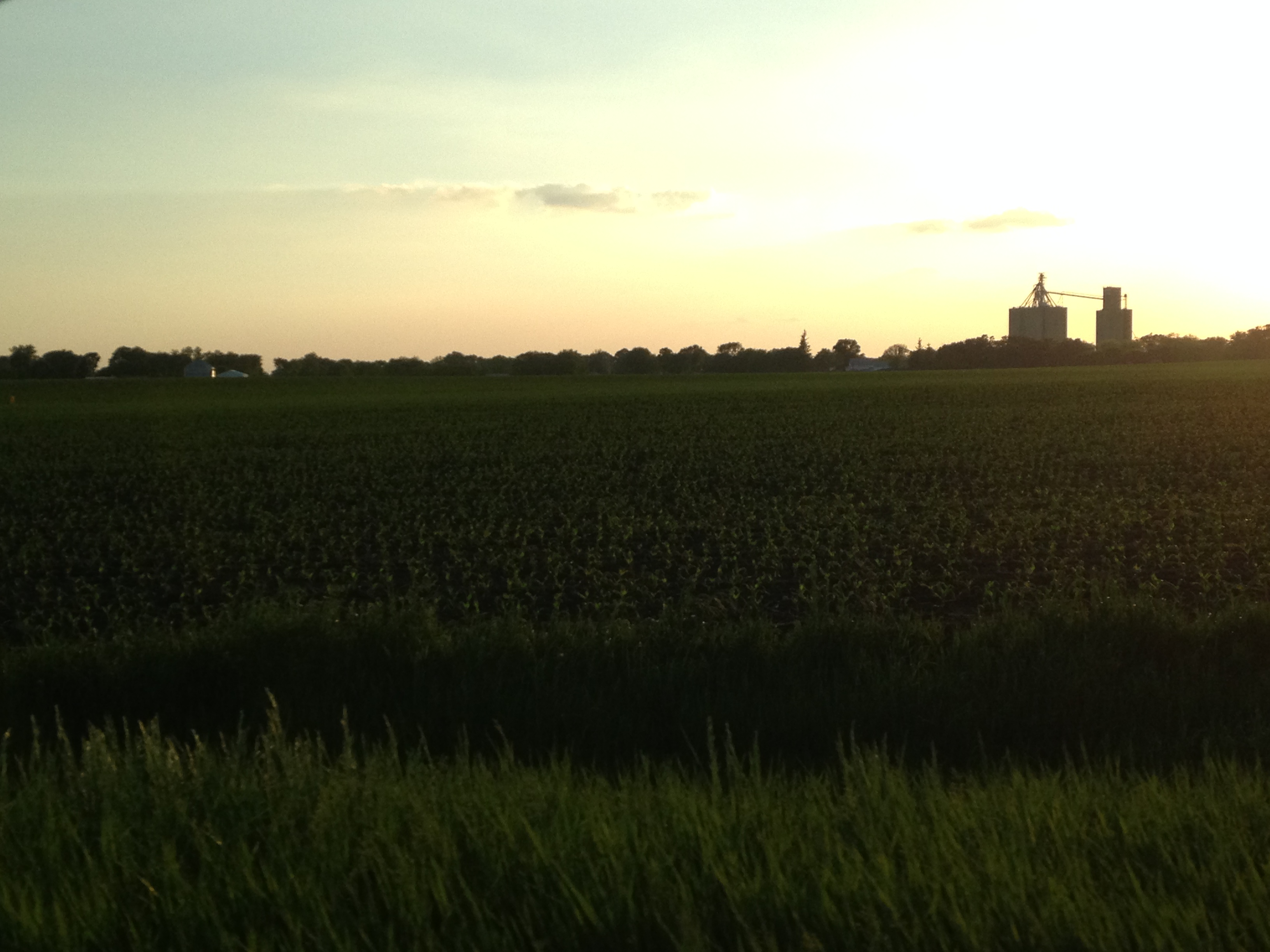
- Field just outside of Somers

- Location of Somers, Iowa
- Coordinates: 42°22′34″N 94°25′47″W
- Country: USA
- State: Iowa
- County: Calhoun

Area
  - Total: 0.34 sq mi (0.88 km^{2})
  - Land: 0.34 sq mi (0.88 km^{2})
  - Water: 0 sq mi (0.00 km^{2})
- Elevation: 1,158 ft (353 m)

Population (2020)
  - Total: 128
  - Density: 375.0/sq mi (144.77/km^{2})
- Time zone: UTC-6 (Central (CST))
  - Summer (DST): UTC-5 (CDT)
- ZIP code: 50586
- Area code: 515
- FIPS code: 19-73920
- GNIS feature ID: 2395911

Somers is a city in Calhoun County, Iowa, United States. The population was 128 at the time of the 2020 census.

== History ==
Somers was platted in 1900 as a shipping point on the railroad.

== Geography ==
According to the United States Census Bureau, the city has a total area of 0.35 square miles (0.91 km^{2}), all land.

== Demographics ==
Historical populations
Year	Pop.	±%
1910	169	—
1920	175	+3.6%
1930	199	+13.7%
1940	213	+7.0%
1950	217	+1.9%
1960	203	−6.5%
1970	197	−3.0%
1980	220	+11.7%
1990	161	−26.8%
2000	165	+2.5%
2010	113	−31.5%
2020	128	+13.3%
Source:"U.S. Census website". United States Census Bureau. and Iowa Data Center; Source: U.S. Decennial Census

=== 2020 census ===
As of the census of 2020, there were 128 people, 61 households, and 38 families residing in the city. The population density was 374.9 inhabitants per square mile (144.8/km^{2}). There were 63 housing units at an average density of 184.5 per square mile (71.3/km^{2}). The racial makeup of the city was 91.4% White, 0.0% Black or African American, 0.8% Native American, 0.0% Asian, 0.0% Pacific Islander, 1.6% from other races and 6.2% from two or more races. Hispanic or Latino persons of any race comprised 2.3% of the population.

Of the 61 households, 24.6% of which had children under the age of 18 living with them, 47.5% were married couples living together, 11.5% were cohabitating couples, 19.7% had a female householder with no spouse or partner present and 21.3% had a male householder with no spouse or partner present. 37.7% of all households were non-families. 34.4% of all households were made up of individuals, 13.1% had someone living alone who was 65 years old or older.

The median age in the city was 44.5 years. 26.6% of the residents were under the age of 20; 3.9% were between the ages of 20 and 24; 19.5% were from 25 and 44; 32.0% were from 45 and 64; and 18.0% were 65 years of age or older. The gender makeup of the city was 55.5% male and 44.5% female.

=== 2010 census ===
As of the census of 2010, there were 113 people, 55 households, and 32 families living in the city. The population density was 322.9 inhabitants per square mile (124.7/km^{2}). There were 68 housing units at an average density of 194.3 per square mile (75.0/km^{2}). The racial makeup of the city was 95.6% White, 0.9% Asian, and 3.5% from two or more races.

There were 55 households, of which 27.3% had children under the age of 18 living with them, 41.8% were married couples living together, 14.5% had a female householder with no husband present, 1.8% had a male householder with no wife present, and 41.8% were non-families. 38.2% of all households were made up of individuals, and 16.4% had someone living alone who was 65 years of age or older. The average household size was 2.05 and the average family size was 2.63.

The median age in the city was 48.1 years. 21.2% of residents were under the age of 18; 5.3% were between the ages of 18 and 24; 20.4% were from 25 to 44; 32.6% were from 45 to 64; and 20.4% were 65 years of age or older. The gender makeup of the city was 53.1% male and 46.9% female.

=== 2000 census ===
As of the census of 2000, there were 165 people, 61 households, and 51 families living in the city. The population density was 473.1 inhabitants per square mile (182.7/km^{2}). There were 66 housing units at an average density of 189.2 per square mile (73.1/km^{2}). The racial makeup of the city was 97.58% White, 0.61% African American, 1.82% from other races. Hispanic or Latino of any race were 3.03% of the population.

There were 61 households, out of which 27.9% had children under the age of 18 living with them, 67.2% were married couples living together, 13.1% had a female householder with no husband present, and 14.8% were non-families. 9.8% of all households were made up of individuals, and 4.9% had someone living alone who was 65 years of age or older. The average household size was 2.70 and the average family size was 2.92.

In the city, the population was spread out, with 24.8% under the age of 18, 8.5% from 18 to 24, 24.8% from 25 to 44, 22.4% from 45 to 64, and 19.4% who were 65 years of age or older. The median age was 40 years. For every 100 females, there were 103.7 males. For every 100 females age 18 and over, there were 96.8 males.

The median income for a household in the city was $31,250, and the median income for a family was $43,750. Males had a median income of $32,083 versus $21,250 for females. The per capita income for the city was $15,777. About 11.5% of families and 15.9% of the population were below the poverty line, including 33.3% of those under the age of eighteen and 16.0% of those 65 or over.

== Education ==
It is in the Southeast Valley Community School District. Southeast Valley High School in Gowrie is that district's comprehensive high school.

Somers was served by the Prairie Valley Community School District, which formed on July 1, 1993 with the merger of the Cedar Valley Community School District and the Prairie Community School District. In 2023 that district merged into the Southeast Valley district.
