= Manson impact structure =

74 million year old impact structure in Iowa

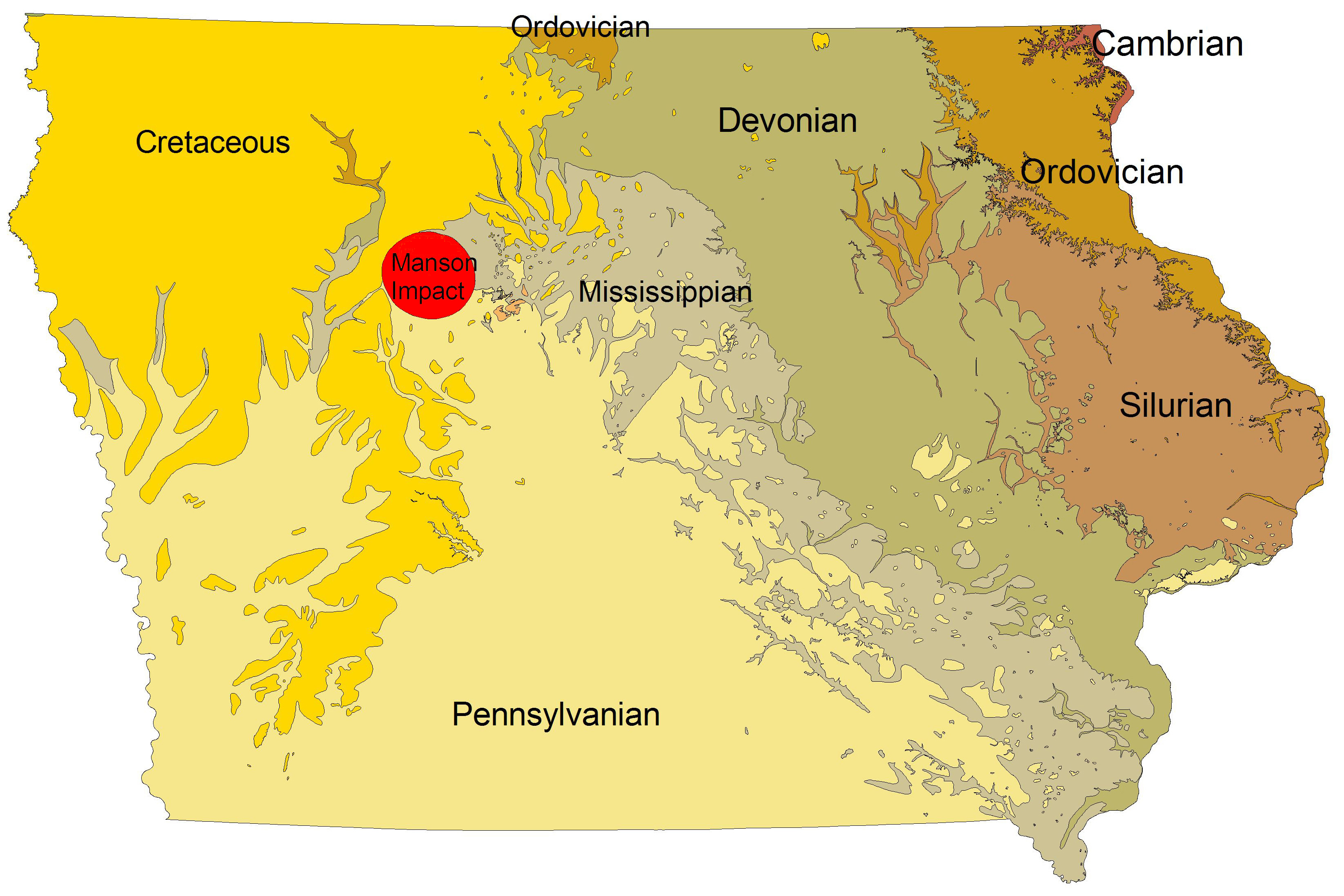
- Manson impact location shown in red on bedrock map of Iowa

- Location within the United States Location within Iowa
- Location: Manson, Iowa, United States; 42°35′N 94°33′W

Impact crater structure
- Confidence: Confirmed
- Diameter: 35 km (22 mi)
- Age: 73.8 ± 0.3 Ma; Late Cretaceous
- Exposed: No
- Drilled: Yes
- Bolide type: Chondrite

The Manson impact structure is an impact structure near the city of Manson, Iowa where an asteroid or comet nucleus struck the Earth during the Cretaceous Period, approximately 74 million years ago. It was one of the largest known impact events to have happened in North America. Previously it was thought to have led to the extinction of the dinosaurs until isotopic ages proved that it was too old.

== Description ==
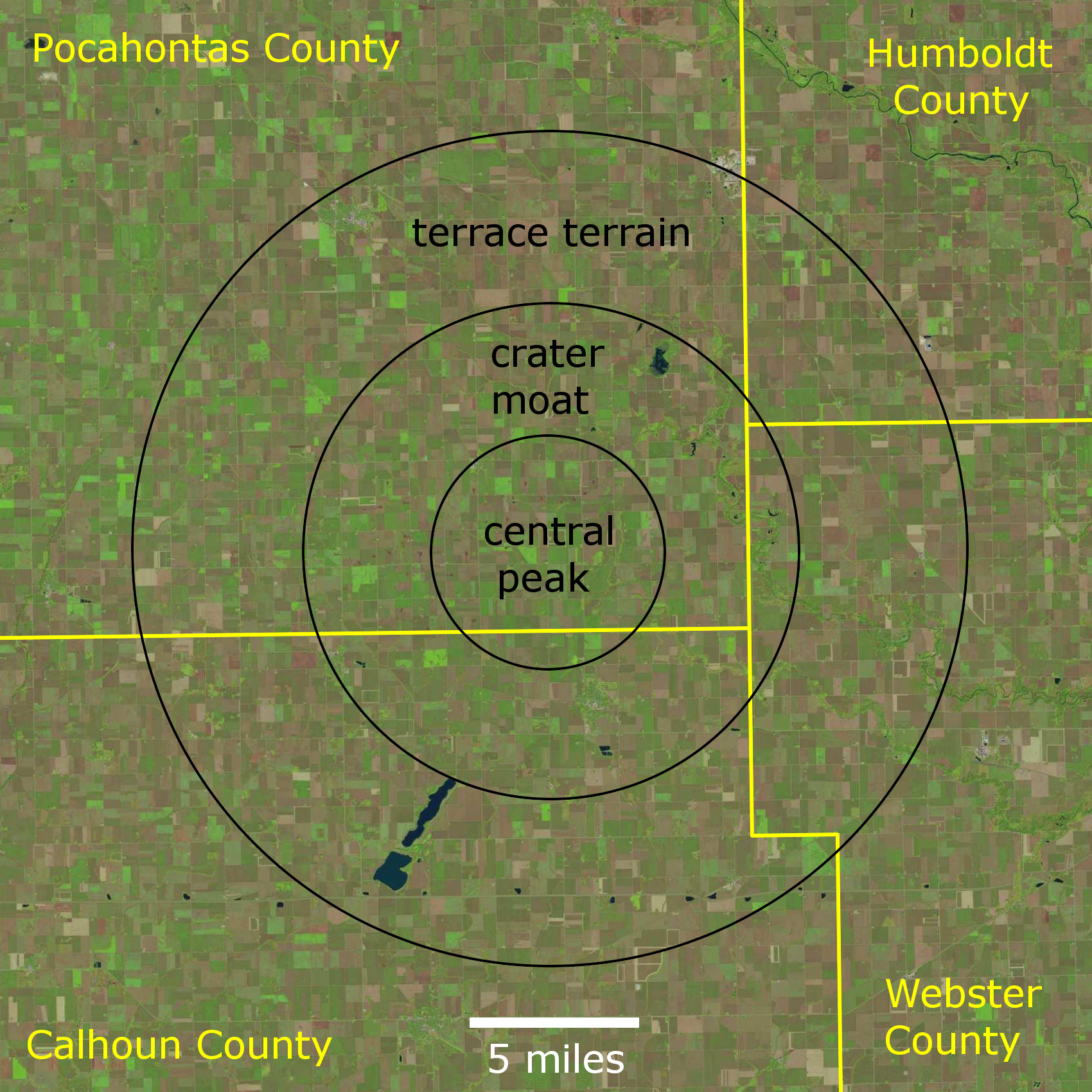
Extent of the Manson impact structure

No surface evidence exists due to comparatively recent coverage by glacial till, and the site where the impact structure lies buried is now a flat landscape. But, hidden about 20 to 90 m (66 to 295 ft) below the surface is a buried structure about 38 km (24 mi) in diameter. It lies under the southeast corner of Pocahontas County and extends under portions of three adjoining counties. That an anomalous structure underlaid the area was known from unusual water well drill cuttings in 1912 of deformed rock, "crystalline clast breccia with a melt matrix" as a later report described it. A research investigation was started in 1955, and it was labeled a "cryptovolcanic structure" (a hypothetical volcanic steam explosion). Further investigation was undertaken by Robert S. Dietz who proposed an impact origin in 1959 and by Nicholas Short in 1966 who produced evidence of shocked quartz grains which confirmed the impact origin of the structure.

In 1991 and 1992 the U.S. Geological Survey along with others including the Iowa Geological Survey conducted detailed research in part to test the possible connection of the Manson impact structure with the Cretaceous–Paleogene extinction event. The ^{40}Ar/^{39}Ar isotope ratio dating of the core from the impact structure gave an age of about 74 Ma, or about 10 Ma older than the K–T boundary.

The impactor is considered to have been a stony meteorite about 2 km (1.2 mi) in diameter. The site at the time was the shore of a shallow inland sea, the Western Interior Seaway. The impact disrupted granite, gneiss, and shales of the Precambrian basement as well as sedimentary formations of Paleozoic age, Devonian through Cretaceous. Limestone layers that give the rest of Iowa hard water were instantaneously vaporized down to the basement rocks, giving Manson the anomalous soft water that it has today.

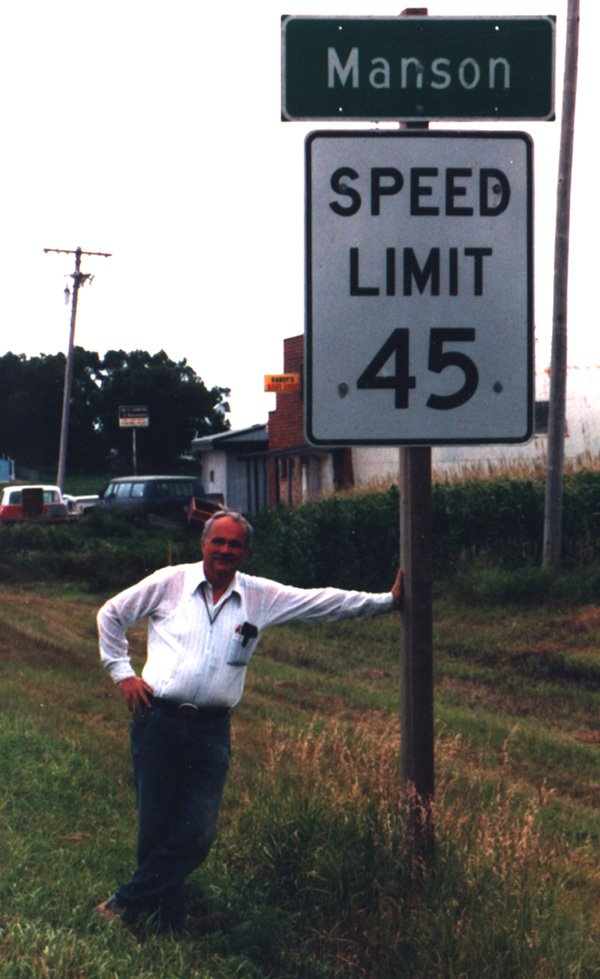
Gene Shoemaker, astrogeologist who studied impact craters, in Manson, Iowa
