= Iowa's 4th Senate district =

American legislative district

Iowa's 4th State Senate district
Senator
Tim Kraayenbrink; R

The 4th district of the Iowa Senate is located in northwestern Iowa. It is currently composed of Calhoun, Pocahontas, Sac, and Webster counties.

== Current elected officials ==
Tim Kraayenbrink is the senator currently representing the 4th District.

The area of the 4th District contains two Iowa House of Representatives districts:

- The 7th District (represented by Mike Sexton)
- The 8th District (represented by Ann Meyer)

The district is also located in Iowa's 4th congressional district, which is represented by U.S. Representative Randy Feenstra.

== List of representatives ==
Representative	Party	Dates	Residence	Notes
James Davis	Whig	1846–1847	Wapello County	
Barney Royston	Democrat	1848–1849	Ottumwa	
Henry Benham Hendershott	Democrat	1850–1851	Ottumwa	
William Greyer Coop	Democrat	1852–1855	Jefferson County	
John Park	Whig	1852–1855	Jefferson County	
William F. Coolbaugh	Democrat	1856–1859	Burlington	
Lyman Cook	Republican	1856–1859	Burlington	
Nathan Udell	Democrat	1860–1867	Appanoose County	
Madison M. Walden	Republican	1868–1869	Centerville	Term ended early due to election as lieutenant governor of Iowa.
William F. Vermillion	Republican	1870–1871	Centerville	
Edward J. Gault	Democrat	1872–1875	Appanoose	
Joshua Miller	Republican	1876–1877	Centerville	
Henry Laurens Dashiell	Republican	1878–1879	Monroe County	
David M. Clark	Greenback	1880–1883	Wayne County	
Lewis Miles	Republican	1884–1887	Wayne County	
Warren S. Dungan	Republican	1888–1891	Chariton	
Lester W. Lewis	Republican	1892–1895	Wayne County	
Harvey L. Byers	Republican	1896–1899	Lucas County	
Alexander Mardis	Republican	1900–1903	Wayne County	
Richard A. Hasselquist	Republican	1904–1906	Chariton	
John Alexander McKlvenn	Republican	1907–1908	Chariton	
George McCullouch	Republican	1909–1912	Humeston	
John H. Darrah	Republican	1913–1916	Chariton	
Karl Miles Le Compte	Republican	1917–1920	Corydon	
James F. Johnston	Republican	1921–1924	Chariton	
Allen G. Dotts	Republican	1925–1928	Corydon	
John W. Kent	Republican	1929–1932	Lucas County	
John H. Judd	Democrat	1933	Chariton	Died in office on January 14, 1933.
Joseph E. Doze	Democrat	1933–1936	Humeston	
Harold V. Levis	Republican	1937–1940	Lucas County	
Clarence L. Clark	Republican	1941–1944	Corydon	
James Alonzo Newsome	Republican	1945–1948	Lucas County	
Pearl W. McMurry	Republican	1949–1950	Corydon	
Ray Fletcher	Republican	1951–1952	Corydon	
William Corwin Stuart	Republican	1953–1962	Chariton	Term ended early due to selection to the Iowa Supreme Court
Howard Vincent	Republican	1963–1964	Chariton	
Franklin S. Main	Democrat	1965–1968	Decatur County	
Quentin V. Anderson	Republican	1969–1970	Elision	
Herbert Luther Ollenburg	Republican	1971–1972	Garner	
Berl E. Priebe	Democrat	1973–1982	Kossuth County	
Richard P. Vande Hoef	Republican	1983–1992	Osceola County	
John P. Kibbie	Democrat	1993–2012	Palo Alto County	
Dennis Guth	Republican	2013–2022	Hancock County	
Tim Kraayenbrink	Republican	2023–present	Webster County	

== Historical district boundaries ==
Map	Description	Years effective	Notes
	Monroe County Wapello County	1846–1849	From 1846 to 1857, district numbering was not utilized by the Iowa State Legislature. This convention was added with the passing of the 1857 Iowa Constitution. Numbering of districts pre-1857 is done as a matter of historic convenience.
	Lucas County; Monroe County Wapello County	1850–1851	
	Jefferson County	1852–1855	
	Des Moines County	1856–1859	
	Appanoose County	1860–1877	
	Monroe County; Wayne County	1878–1883	
	Lucas County; Wayne County	1884–1962	
	Decatur County Ringgold County; Union County	1963–1966	
	Clarke County; Decatur County Ringgold County; Wayne County	1967–1970	
	Cerro Gordo (partial) Hancock County; Winnebago County; Wright County (partial); Worth County	1971–1972	In 1970, the Iowa Legislature passed an amendment to the Iowa Constitution setting forth the rules for legislative redistricting in order to abide by the rules established by the Reynolds v. Sims Supreme Court case. The first reapportionment map created by the Republican controlled legislature was deemed unconstitutional, but was still used for the 1970 election.
	Emmet County (partial) Hancock County (partial); Humboldt County (partial); Kossuth County, Iowa; Palo Alto County (partial); Pocahontas County (partial); Winnebago County	1973–1982	
	Cherokee County Clay County (partial); Lyon County; O'Brien County; Osceola County; Sioux County (partial)	1983–1992	
	Clay County (partial) Dickinson County; Emmet County; Kossuth County (partial); Palo Alto County	1993–2002	
	Emmet County Humboldt County; Kossuth County; Palo Alto County; Pocahontas County; Webster County (partial): Deer Creek Township; Jackson Township; Johnson Township	2003–2012	
	Emmet County Hancock County; Kossuth County; Winnebago County; Wright County	2013–2022	
	Calhoun County Pocahontas County; Sac County; Webster County	2023–present	

== Recent election results from statewide races ==
Year	Office	Results
2008	President	Obama 49–48%
2012	President	Romney 52–48%
2016	President	Trump 63–31%
2016	Senate	Grassley 69–27%
2018	Governor	Reynolds 60–38%
2018	Attorney General	Miller 77–23%
2018	Secretary of State	Pate 62–36%
2018	Treasurer	Fitzgerald 51–47%
2018	Auditor	Mosiman 54–44%
2020	President	Trump 66–32%
2020	Senate	Ernst 63–34%
2022	Senate	Grassley 70–30%
2022	Governor	Reynolds 72–26%
2022	Attorney General	Bird 60–40%
2022	Secretary of State	Pate 73–27%
2022	Treasurer	Smith 60–40%
2022	Auditor	Halbur 60–40%
2024	President	Trump 69–29%

== See also ==
- Iowa General Assembly
- Iowa Senate
