= Corinth Township, Humboldt County, Iowa =

Corinth Township
- Township
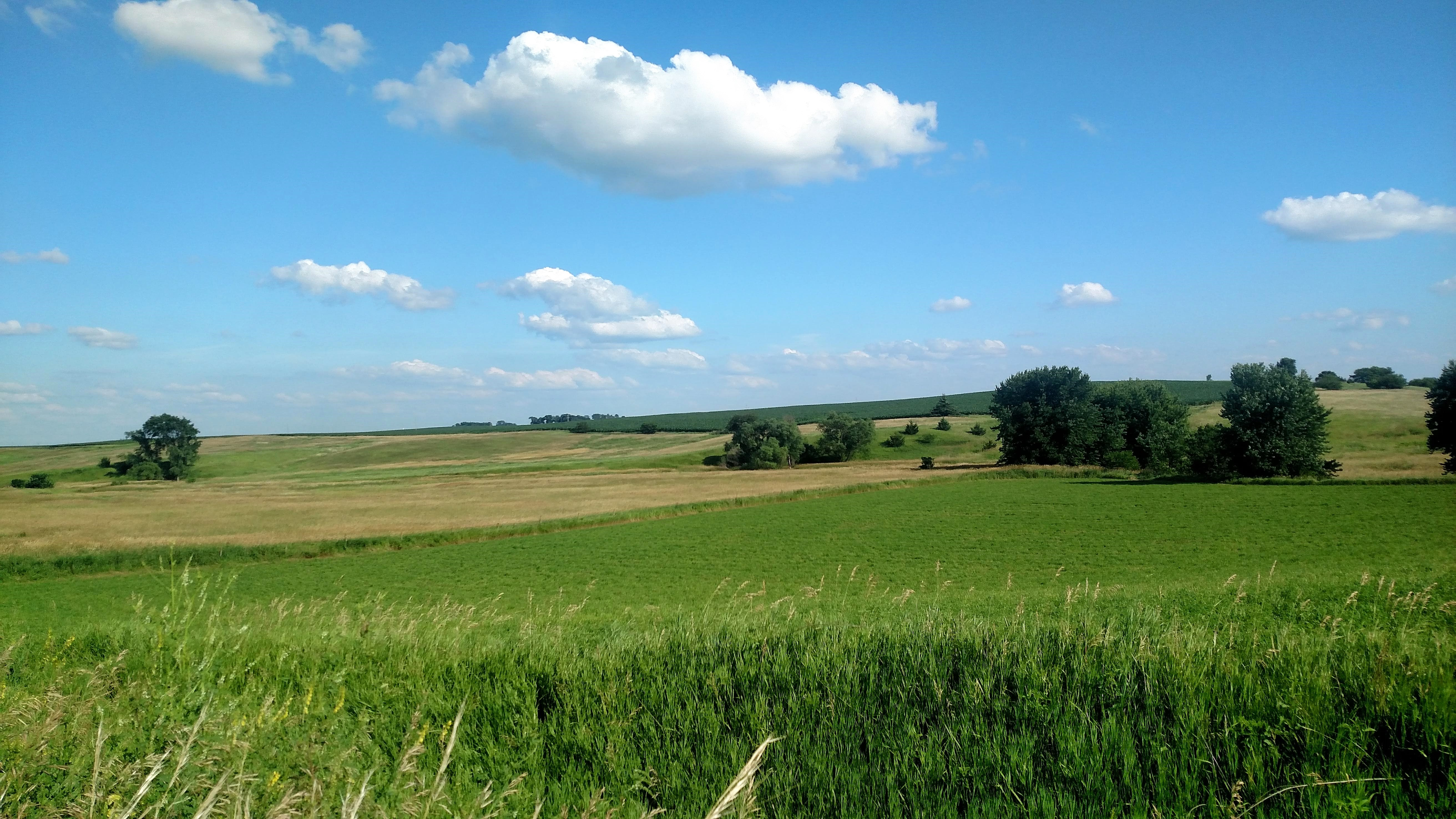
- Farmland in Corinth Township

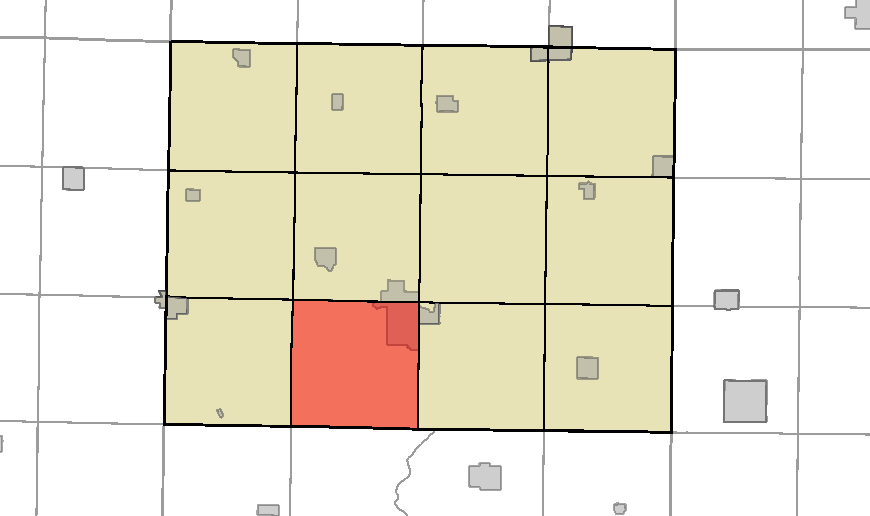
- Location in Humboldt County

- Humboldt County's location in Iowa
- Coordinates: 42°41′N 94°16′W
- Country: United States
- State: Iowa
- County: Humboldt
- Established: 1876

Area
  - Total: 32.8 sq mi (85 km^{2})
  - Land: 32.7 sq mi (85 km^{2})
  - Water: 0.1 sq mi (0.26 km^{2})
- Elevation: 1,129 ft (344 m)

Population (2000)
  - Total: 366
  - Density: 11/sq mi (4.2/km^{2})
- Time zone: UTC-6 (CST)
  - Summer (DST): UTC-5 (CDT)
- ZIP codes: 50548 (Humboldt)
- GNIS feature ID: 0467658

Corinth Township is one of twelve townships in Humboldt County, Iowa, United States. As of the 2000 census, its unincorporated population was 366. Corinth Township also contains most of the largest town in Humboldt County, Humboldt.

== History ==
Corinth Township was organized in 1879.

== Geography ==
According to the United States Census Bureau, Corinth Township covers an area of 32.8 square miles (85 km^{2}); of this, 32.7 square miles (85 km^{2}) is land and 0.1 square miles (0.26 km^{2}) is water.

=== Cities, towns, villages ===
- Humboldt

=== Adjacent townships ===
- Rutland Township (north)
- Grove Township (northeast)
- Beaver Township (east)
- Badger Township, Webster County (southeast)
- Deer Creek Township, Webster County (south)
- Jackson Township, Webster County (southwest)
- Weaver Township (west)
- Avery Township (northwest)

=== Cemeteries ===
The township contains Indian Mound Cemetery, Oakwood Cemetery, and Our Saviors Cemetery. St. Mary's Cemetery is located within the Humboldt city limits.

== Political districts ==
- Iowa's 4th congressional district
- State House District 4
