= Wahkonsa Township, Webster County, Iowa =

Township in Iowa, USA

Wahkonsa Township
- Township
- Wahkonsa Township within the United States Wahkonsa Township (Iowa)
- Coordinates: 42.62°N 94.14°W
- Country: United States
- State: Iowa
- County: Webster County
- Organized: March 3, 1856
- Named for: Indian chief
- Time zone: UTC-06:00 (Central (CST))
  - Summer (DST): UTC-05:00 (Central (CST))
- Other spellings: Wakonza, Wahonksa
- School district: Fort Dodge Community School District

Wahkonsa Township is a township in Webster County, Iowa. Since the year 1872, the township includes only the city limits of Fort Dodge and no longer many notable settlements.

== History ==
Wahkonsa Township was organized on March 3, 1856, in an attempt to reduce the boundaries of Washington Township which for a time contained all of Webster and Hamilton counties. The boundaries of the township, as well as those of six other townships organized that day in Webster County, were fixed by the County court. Wahkonsa Township was set to contain 470 mi² (300,800 acres) of land.

Wahkonsa township was named in honor of a young Indian chief of the name who frequently visited the neighboring city of Fort Dodge. The first settler in the present-day township was Mrs. Geo H. Rodgers, and the first sermon preached was by Reverend J. B. Montgomery in 1851.

The boundaries of the township were changed on March 24, 1857, so that the township would only border east of the Des Moines river, in exchange for some additional territory in the north. In 1865, the boundaries of the township again changed as the territory today known as Badger township separated. The boundaries were reduced again in 1872 to only include township 89 and range 28, and finally on September 6, 1877, with the separation of Cooper Township. Wahkonsa Township now only embraces the city limits of Fort Dodge, no longer including nearly any notable settlements.

== 1857 Election Results ==
The first township elections took place on Monday, April 6, 1857 in an old log school-house built by the government which elected the County Judge, Clerk of the District Count, Sheriff, Treasurer, Recorder, Drainage Commissioner, County Surveyor, County Assessor, Superintendent of Public Instruction, Register of State Land, Commissioner of Des Moines River Improvement, Township Trustee, Township Clerk, Justice of the Peace, Constable, and Road Supervisor (not included) of the township.

1857 Elections
| Candidate | Office | Votes Received | Votes Cast |
|---|---|---|---|
| L. M. Scott | Township Trustee | 81 | 399 |
| Robert F. Gray | Constable | 76 | 264 |
| Fred Boot | Justice of Peace | 75 | 241 |
| Lewis Davis | County Assessor | 86 | 142 |
| Gideon S. Bailey | Commissioner of the Des Moines River Improvement | 83 | 141 |
| Samuel Rees | County Judge | 89 | 141 |
| Adam Mepmore | Drainage Commissioner | 84 | 141 |
| Theodore S. Parvin | Register of the State Land | 82 | 141 |
| Jno. H. Williams | Sheriff | 80 | 141 |
| Maturin L. Fisher | Superintendent of Public Instruction | 83 | 141 |
| Samuel Rees | District Clerk | 89 | 140 |
| A. Morrison | County Surveyor | 80 | 139 |
| J. A. Humphrey | Township Clerk | 78 | 137 |
| Thos. White | Treasurer | 73 | 132 |
| Jn. Garaghty | Recorder | 70 | 131 |

^ Information is organized by votes cast. If there is a tie in votes cast, it is organized alphabetically by office.
