= Judd, Iowa =

Judd
- former unincorporated community
- Location within the state of Iowa Judd (the United States)
- Coordinates: 42°28′20″N 94°2′59″W
- Country: United States
- State: Iowa
- County: Webster
- Elevation: 1,112 ft (339 m)
- Time zone: UTC-6 (Central (CST))
  - Summer (DST): UTC-5 (CDT)
- ZIP codes: 50521
- GNIS feature ID: 464597

Judd was an unincorporated community in Webster County, Iowa, United States.

== Geography ==
Judd was in the northern part of Washington Township, adjacent to Colfax Township, 2.5 miles west of Duncombe. Its elevation was 1112 feet (339 m).

== History ==
Judd was named for Norman P. Judd, an executive at the Illinois Central Railroad. In 1913, Judd had a post office/general store. The grain elevator was operated by the Western Elevator Company.

Judd's population was 54 in 1902, and was 52 in 1915.

In 1940, Judd's population was 50.

== See also ==
- Burnside, Iowa
