= Paul McCarville =

American politician (1901–1979)

Paul E. McCarville (June 30, 1901 – March 3, 1979) was an American lawyer and politician.

== Personal life ==
McCarville was born on June 30, 1901 in Moorland, Iowa. His parents, Thomas and Lillian, were from Darlington, Wisconsin. After Paul had lived with other relatives in Pocahontas and Buena Vista counties, he moved with his parents to Fort Dodge and graduated from Sacred Heart High School in 1920. McCarville then moved to Nebraska to enroll at Creighton University. He earned a Bachelor of Arts degree in 1925 and completed a Juris Doctor at Creighton Law in 1927. He subsequently returned to Fort Dodge to practice law continuously until his death on March 3, 1979.

== Public service career ==
Between 1940 and 1948, McCarville was a justice of the peace in Wahkonsa Township. He contested that year's legislative election and won the District 27 seat in the Iowa Senate, serving until the end of his term in 1953. During his legislative career, McCarville additionally served as chair of Webster County's Republican Central Committee in 1950 and 1951. He was an officer of several fraternal orders including supreme governor of the Loyal Order of Moose in 1955, district deputy of the Knights of Columbus from 1944 to 1948, and chief ranger of the Catholic Order of Foresters.
