= Beaver Township, Humboldt County, Iowa =

Beaver Township
- Township
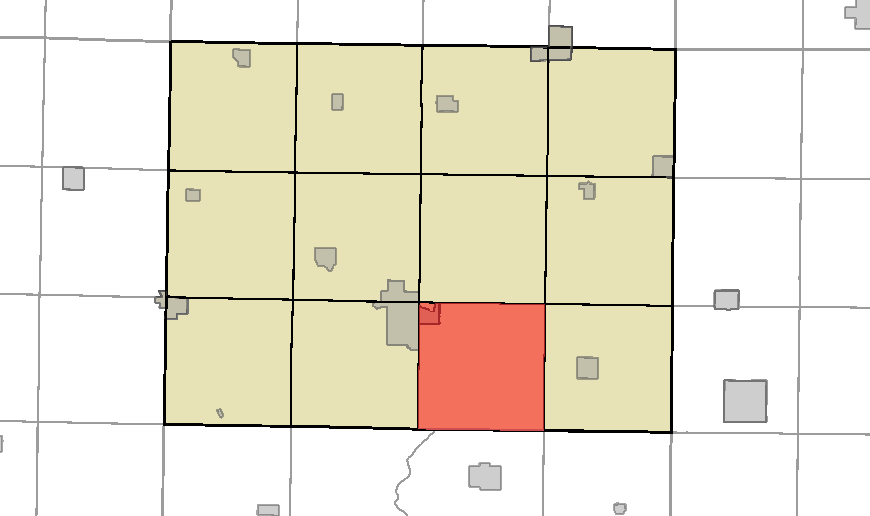
- Location in Humboldt County

- Humboldt County's location in Iowa
- Coordinates: 42°41′46″N 94°08′31″W
- Country: United States
- State: Iowa
- County: Humboldt
- Established: 1878

Area
  - Total: 36.1 sq mi (93 km^{2})
  - Land: 34.9 sq mi (90 km^{2})
  - Water: 0.2 sq mi (0.52 km^{2})
- Elevation: 1,132 ft (345 m)

Population (2000)
  - Total: 351
  - Density: 10/sq mi (3.9/km^{2})
- Time zone: UTC-6 (CST)
  - Summer (DST): UTC-5 (CDT)
- ZIP codes: 50529 (Dakota City)
- GNIS feature ID: 0467427

Beaver Township is one of twelve townships in Humboldt County, Iowa, United States. As of the 2000 census, its population was 351. Beaver Township also contains the county seat of Humboldt County, Dakota City.

== History ==
Beaver Township was organized in 1878.

== Geography ==
According to the United States Census Bureau, Beaver Township covers an area of 36.1 square miles (93 km^{2}); of this, 35.9 square miles (93 km^{2}) is land and 0.2 square miles (0.52 km^{2}) is water.

=== Cities, towns, villages ===
- Dakota City

=== Adjacent townships ===
- Grove Township (north)
- Lake Township (northeast)
- Norway Township (east)
- Newark Township, Webster County (southeast)
- Badger Township, Webster County (south)
- Deer Creek Township, Webster County (southwest)
- Corinth Township (west)
- Rutland Township (northwest)

=== Cemeteries ===
The township contains both East Beaver Cemetery and Zion Cemetery.

== Political districts ==
- Iowa's 4th congressional district
- State House District 4
