= Callender, Iowa =

- City
- Location of Callender, Iowa
- Coordinates: 42°21′42″N 94°17′44″W
- Country: US
- State: Iowa
- County: Webster

Area
  - Total: 0.53 sq mi (1.36 km^{2})
  - Land: 0.53 sq mi (1.36 km^{2})
  - Water: 0 sq mi (0.00 km^{2})
- Elevation: 1,148 ft (350 m)

Population (2020)
  - Total: 368
  - Density: 700.3/sq mi (270.37/km^{2})
- Time zone: UTC-6 (Central (CST))
  - Summer (DST): UTC-5 (CDT)
- ZIP code: 50523
- Area code: 515
- FIPS code: 19-09955
- GNIS feature ID: 2393498
- Website: cityofcallenderiowa.com

Callender is a city in Webster County, Iowa, United States. The population was 368 at the time of the 2020 census.

== History ==
From 1866 to 1870, the Des Moines Valley Railroad Company constructed tracks between Des Moines and Fort Dodge. The other end of the line originated at Keokuk (at the confluence of the Des Moines and Mississippi rivers). As a result, several small towns were created by the railroad along the line to support track maintenance and to grow business. At 7 to 10 mi (11 to 16 km) intervals were 38 stops between Keokuk and Fort Dodge. Kesho, the town that would become Callender, was the 36th stop.

According to the County Assessor's records, the town of Kesho began south of the road (Thomas Street) on the east side of the railroad tracks. There, Gurmond and Thora Bean had established a store in 1867–68. The store was operational when the Des Moines Valley Railroad made it to Kesho in December 1869; however, a November 24, 1870 newspaper article from the Iowa Northwest Newspaper reads, “The city has disappeared from the face of the earth—not like Pompeii—but it has gone off on wheels. First the horse barn fell down, then the hotel was taken to pieces and moved off, and lately the depot has been hoisted on wheels, moved 9 miles (14 km) up the road and landed near the Sioux City Junction (Tara). Kesho is now inhabited by muskrats alone.” A new depot replaced the old one that existed, until it was demolished in 1972. Post office records indicate that there was a post office in Kesho from 1873 until 1877.

In 1875, the town was renamed Callender in honor of Agnes and James Callender of Brooklyn Heights, New York City, New York who owned all of the land on the west side of the railroad tracks and much of the surrounding area—Webster's Prairies. The Callenders donated land to the town for churches, the school, City Hall and the City Park. A second depot was built on the west side of the track, north of Main (Thomas) Street. The existing town retains much of the 1875 town form, including the donated properties.

== Geography ==
According to the United States Census Bureau, the city has a total area of 0.52 square miles (1.35 km^{2}), all land.

== Demographics ==
Historical populations
| Year | Pop. | ±% |
|---|---|---|
| 1880 | 50 | — |
| 1890 | 145 | +190.0% |
| 1900 | 399 | +175.2% |
| 1910 | 321 | −19.5% |
| 1920 | 376 | +17.1% |
| 1930 | 349 | −7.2% |
| 1940 | 377 | +8.0% |
| 1950 | 387 | +2.7% |
| 1960 | 358 | −7.5% |
| 1970 | 421 | +17.6% |
| 1980 | 446 | +5.9% |
| 1990 | 384 | −13.9% |
| 2000 | 424 | +10.4% |
| 2010 | 376 | −11.3% |
| 2020 | 368 | −2.1% |
Source:"U.S. Census website". census.gov. United States Census Bureau. and "Population Data Table" (PDF). Iowa Data Center. Source: U.S. Decennial Census

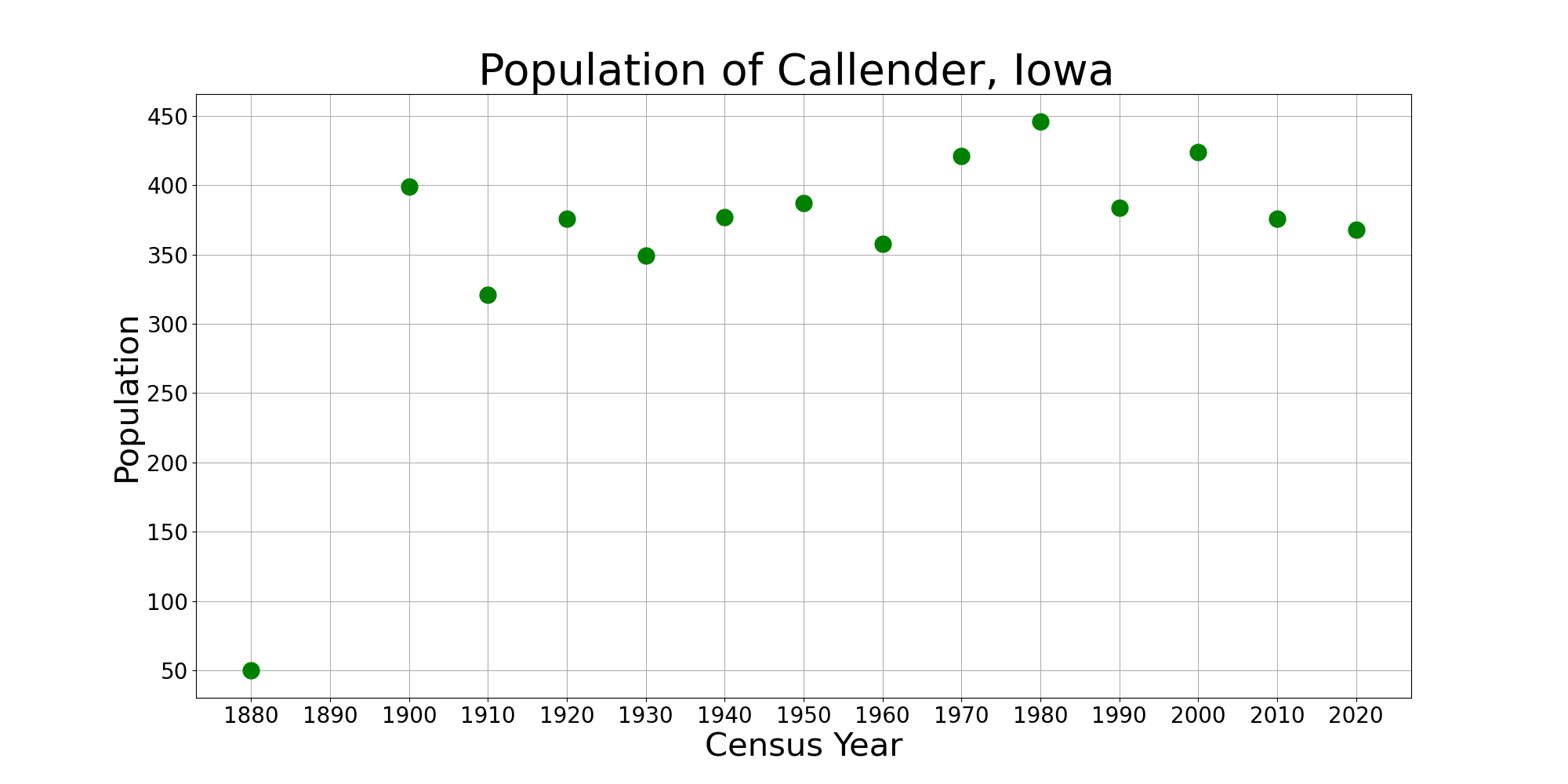
The population of Callender, Iowa from US census data

=== 2020 census ===
As of the census of 2020, there were 368 people, 158 households, and 96 families residing in the city. The population density was 700.3 inhabitants per square mile (270.4/km^{2}). There were 175 housing units at an average density of 333.0 per square mile (128.6/km^{2}). The racial makeup of the city was 92.4% White, 0.0% Black or African American, 0.0% Native American, 0.3% Asian, 0.0% Pacific Islander, 0.3% from other races and 7.1% from two or more races. Hispanic or Latino persons of any race comprised 4.1% of the population.

Of the 158 households, 27.2% of which had children under the age of 18 living with them, 49.4% were married couples living together, 5.7% were cohabitating couples, 24.1% had a female householder with no spouse or partner present and 20.9% had a male householder with no spouse or partner present. 39.2% of all households were non-families. 32.9% of all households were made up of individuals, 13.9% had someone living alone who was 65 years old or older.

The median age in the city was 40.3 years. 26.6% of the residents were under the age of 20; 4.9% were between the ages of 20 and 24; 22.6% were from 25 and 44; 29.6% were from 45 and 64; and 16.3% were 65 years of age or older. The gender makeup of the city was 52.7% male and 47.3% female.

=== 2010 census ===
At the 2010 census there were 376 people in 162 households, including 111 families, in the city. The population density was 737.3 inhabitants per square mile (284.7/km^{2}). There were 178 housing units at an average density of 349.0 per square mile (134.7/km^{2}). The racial makup of the city was 98.7% White, 0.3% African American, 0.3% Native American, and 0.8% from two or more races. Of the 162 households 28.4% had children under the age of 18 living with them, 51.9% were married couples living together, 9.9% had a female householder with no husband present, and 31.5% were non-families. 28.4% of households were one person and 15.4% were one person aged 65 or older. The average household size was 2.32 and the average family size was 2.85.

The age distribution was 23.4% under the age of 18, 9.2% from 18 to 24, 20.2% from 25 to 44, 29.9% from 45 to 64, and 17.3% 65 or older. The median age was 42.3 years. For every 100 females, there were 98.9 males. For every 100 females age 18 and over, there were 94.6 males.

=== 2000 census ===
At the 2000 census there were 424 people in 168 households, including 113 families, in the city. The population density was 830.8 inhabitants per square mile (320.8/km^{2}). There were 179 housing units at an average density of 350.7 per square mile (135.4/km^{2}). The racial makup of the city was 98.35% White, 0.24% African American, 0.71% Native American, and 0.71% from two or more races. Of the 168 households 36.3% had children under the age of 18 living with them, 56.5% were married couples living together, 7.7% had a female householder with no husband present, and 32.7% were non-families. 28.0% of households were one person and 15.5% were one person aged 65 or older. The average household size was 2.52 and the average family size was 3.14.

The age distribution was 27.8% under the age of 18, 10.1% from 18 to 24, 27.1% from 25 to 44, 17.9% from 45 to 64, and 17.0% 65 or older. The median age was 36 years. For every 100 females, there were 90.1 males. For every 100 females age 18 and over, there were 90.1 males.

The following income data is from 2000. The median household income was $33,906 and the median family income was $42,917. Males had a median income of $26,917 versus $24,250 for females. The per capita income for the city was $14,411. About 9.5% of families and 11.0% of the population were below the poverty line, including 18.3% of those under age 18 and 2.6% of those age 65 or over.

== Education ==
It is in the Southeast Valley Community School District. Southeast Valley High School in Gowrie is that district's comprehensive high school.

Callender was formerly part of the Prairie Valley Community School District, which formed on July 1, 1993, with the merger of the Cedar Valley Community School District and the Prairie Community School District. In 2023 that district merged into the Southeast Valley district.

The elementary school for the school district was in Callender from 1994 until 2010. The middle school was near Farnhamville and the high school was in Gowrie. Before that, Callender was the elementary and middle school for Prairie Community, a consolidated school district including Moorland, Callender, Gowrie, and Lanyon. From 1962 until 1974 Callender, Moorland and Gowrie each had elementary schools. Callender also had a junior high school and Gowrie also had a high school.

== Infrastructure ==
=== Transportation ===
Callender is at the intersection of County Roads P33 (Fairbanks Ave) and D43 (295th St).

The Union Pacific Railroad is on the east end of town

The Fort Dodge Regional Airport is located 20 miles northwest of town. It is primarily a general aviation airport, but it does have commercial links from Great Lakes Airlines.
