= Thor, Iowa =

- City
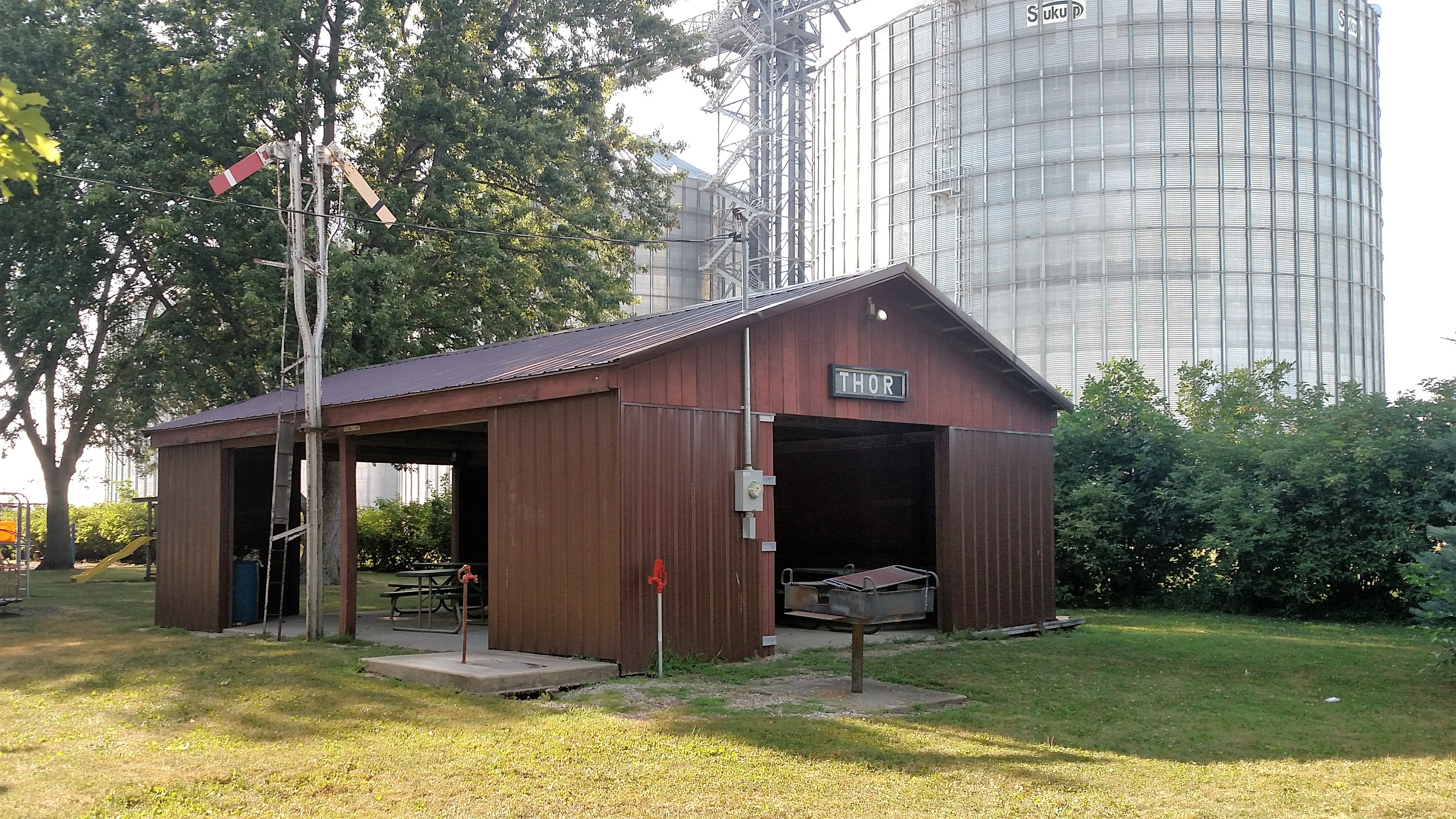
- Park in Thor

- Location of Thor, Iowa
- Coordinates: 42°41′17″N 94°02′59″W
- Country: USA
- State: Iowa
- County: Humboldt

Area
  - Total: 1.00 sq mi (2.58 km^{2})
  - Land: 1.00 sq mi (2.58 km^{2})
  - Water: 0 sq mi (0.00 km^{2})
- Elevation: 1,142 ft (348 m)

Population (2020)
  - Total: 181
  - Density: 181.8/sq mi (70.21/km^{2})
- Time zone: UTC-6 (Central (CST))
  - Summer (DST): UTC-5 (CDT)
- ZIP code: 50591
- Area code: 515
- FIPS code: 19-77790
- GNIS feature ID: 2397019

Thor is a small city in Norway Township, Humboldt County, Iowa, United States. The population was 181 at the time of the 2020 census.

== History ==
The small city of Thor is a farming community which was originally built up chiefly by Scandinavian immigrants. Settlement of the township started in 1869 with the filing of a claim by Ole Willicksen, who was a native of Stavanger, Norway. In 1881, the town of Thor was laid out by the Western Town Lot Company. Thor was platted in 1882. It was named after the mythical deity Thor in Old Norse mythology.

Thor was formerly serviced by Iowa Highway 302, which was decommissioned in 1980.

== Geography ==
According to the United States Census Bureau, the city has a total area of 1.00 square mile (2.59 km^{2}), all land.

== Demographics ==
Historical populations
| Year | Pop. | ±% |
|---|---|---|
| 1900 | 274 | — |
| 1910 | 271 | −1.1% |
| 1920 | 285 | +5.2% |
| 1930 | 257 | −9.8% |
| 1940 | 264 | +2.7% |
| 1950 | 271 | +2.7% |
| 1960 | 234 | −13.7% |
| 1970 | 212 | −9.4% |
| 1980 | 200 | −5.7% |
| 1990 | 205 | +2.5% |
| 2000 | 174 | −15.1% |
| 2010 | 186 | +6.9% |
| 2020 | 181 | −2.7% |
Sources: Source: U.S. Decennial Census

=== 2020 census ===
As of the census of 2020, there were 181 people, 67 households, and 48 families residing in the city. The population density was 181.8 inhabitants per square mile (70.2/km^{2}). There were 77 housing units at an average density of 77.4 per square mile (29.9/km^{2}). The racial makeup of the city was 92.8% White, 0.6% Black or African American, 0.0% Native American, 0.0% Asian, 0.0% Pacific Islander, 1.1% from other races and 5.5% from two or more races. Hispanic or Latino persons of any race comprised 5.0% of the population.

Of the 67 households, 47.8% of which had children under the age of 18 living with them, 43.3% were married couples living together, 11.9% were cohabitating couples, 20.9% had a female householder with no spouse or partner present and 23.9% had a male householder with no spouse or partner present. 28.4% of all households were non-families. 22.4% of all households were made up of individuals, 6.0% had someone living alone who was 65 years old or older.

The median age in the city was 31.8 years. 34.3% of the residents were under the age of 20; 7.2% were between the ages of 20 and 24; 26.5% were from 25 and 44; 18.8% were from 45 and 64; and 13.3% were 65 years of age or older. The gender makeup of the city was 53.6% male and 46.4% female.

=== 2010 census ===
As of the census of 2010, there were 186 people, 73 households, and 49 families residing in the city. The population density was 186.0 inhabitants per square mile (71.8/km^{2}). There were 80 housing units at an average density of 80.0 per square mile (30.9/km^{2}). The racial makeup of the city was 96.2% White, 1.1% Asian, and 2.7% from two or more races. Hispanic or Latino of any race were 3.2% of the population.

There were 73 households, of which 34.2% had children under the age of 18 living with them, 58.9% were married couples living together, 8.2% had a female householder with no husband present, and 32.9% were non-families. 26.0% of all households were made up of individuals, and 8.2% had someone living alone who was 65 years of age or older. The average household size was 2.55 and the average family size was 3.12.

The median age in the city was 32.7 years. 25.8% of residents were under the age of 18; 12.4% were between the ages of 18 and 24; 32.9% were from 25 to 44; 17.8% were from 45 to 64; and 11.3% were 65 years of age or older. The gender makeup of the city was 52.2% male and 47.8% female.

=== 2000 census ===
As of the census of 2000, there were 174 people, 82 households, and 45 families residing in the city. The population density was 174.6 inhabitants per square mile (67.4/km^{2}). There were 88 housing units at an average density of 88.3 per square mile (34.1/km^{2}). The racial makeup of the city was 100.00% White.

There were 82 households, out of which 23.2% had children under the age of 18 living with them, 45.1% were married couples living together, 3.7% had a female householder with no husband present, and 45.1% were non-families. 36.6% of all households were made up of individuals, and 17.1% had someone living alone who was 65 years of age or older. The average household size was 2.12 and the average family size was 2.76.

In the city, the population was spread out, with 21.8% under the age of 18, 6.3% from 18 to 24, 28.2% from 25 to 44, 28.2% from 45 to 64, and 15.5% who were 65 years of age or older. The median age was 36 years. For every 100 females, there were 93.3 males. For every 100 females age 18 and over, there were 103.0 males.

The median income for a household in the city was $36,000, and the median income for a family was $37,500. Males had a median income of $29,375 versus $23,000 for females. The per capita income for the city was $18,410. About 9.5% of families and 10.3% of the population were below the poverty line, including 16.0% of those under the age of eighteen and 24.1% of those 65 or over.

== Education ==
The Eagle Grove Community School District serves children from PreK to 12th grade. The district covers area of Wright, Humboldt, and Webster counties, and serves the communities of Eagle Grove, Thor, Vincent, Woolstock, and the surrounding rural areas.
