= Norway Township, Humboldt County, Iowa =

Norway Township
- Township
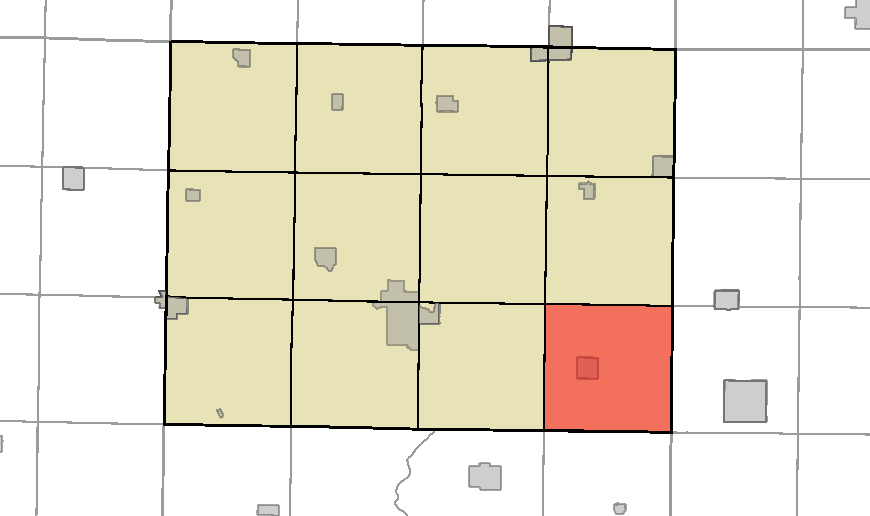
- Location in Humboldt County
- Coordinates: 42°40′17″N 94°00′19″W
- Country: United States
- State: Iowa
- County: Humboldt
- Established: 1875

Area
  - Total: 36.2 sq mi (94 km^{2})
  - Land: 36.2 sq mi (94 km^{2})
  - Water: 0.0 sq mi (0 km^{2})
- Elevation: 1,129 ft (344 m)

Population (2000)
  - Total: 410
  - Density: 11/sq mi (4.2/km^{2})
- Time zone: UTC-6 (CST)
  - Summer (DST): UTC-5 (CDT)
- ZIP codes: 50591 (Thor)
- GNIS feature ID: 0468451

Norway Township is one of twelve townships in Humboldt County, Iowa, United States. As of the 2000 census, its population was 410.

== History ==
Norway Township was organized in 1870. It was originally built up chiefly by Scandinavians.

== Geography ==
According to the United States Census Bureau, Norway Township covers an area of 36.2 square miles (94 km^{2}); all of this is land.

=== Cities, towns, villages ===
- Thor

=== Adjacent townships ===
- Lake Township (north)
- Liberty Township, Wright County (northeast)
- Eagle Grove Township, Wright County (east)
- Troy Township, Wright County (southeast)
- Newark Township, Webster County (south)
- Badger Township, Webster County (southwest)
- Beaver Township (west)
- Grove Township (northwest)

=== Cemeteries ===
The township contains East/West Ullensvang, Norway Lake, Norway Township, and Willicksen Cemetery.

== Political districts ==
- Iowa's 4th congressional district
- State House District 4
