= Badger, Iowa =

- City
- Location of Badger, Iowa
- Coordinates: 42°36′51″N 94°08′41″W
- Country: USA
- State: Iowa
- County: Webster

Area
  - Total: 1.12 sq mi (2.91 km^{2})
  - Land: 1.12 sq mi (2.91 km^{2})
  - Water: 0 sq mi (0.00 km^{2})
- Elevation: 1,155 ft (352 m)

Population (2020)
  - Total: 522
  - Density: 464/sq mi (179.1/km^{2})
- Time zone: UTC-6 (Central (CST))
  - Summer (DST): UTC-5 (CDT)
- ZIP code: 50516
- Area code: 515
- FIPS code: 19-04195
- GNIS feature ID: 2394050
- Website: cityofbadger.com

Badger is a city in Webster County, Iowa, United States. The population was 522 at the 2020 census. The town got its name from Badger Creek, which itself got its name when a group of soldiers from Fort Dodge in the early 1850s saw a badger for the first time.

== Geography ==
According to the United States Census Bureau, the city has a total area of 1.09 square miles (2.82 km^{2}), all land.

== Demographics ==
Historical populations
Year	Pop.	±%
1900	240	—
1910	212	−11.7%
1920	244	+15.1%
1930	254	+4.1%
1940	251	−1.2%
1950	301	+19.9%
1960	340	+13.0%
1970	465	+36.8%
1980	653	+40.4%
1990	569	−12.9%
2000	610	+7.2%
2010	561	−8.0%
2020	522	−7.0%
Source:"U.S. Census website". United States Census Bureau. and Iowa Data Center; Source: U.S. Decennial Census

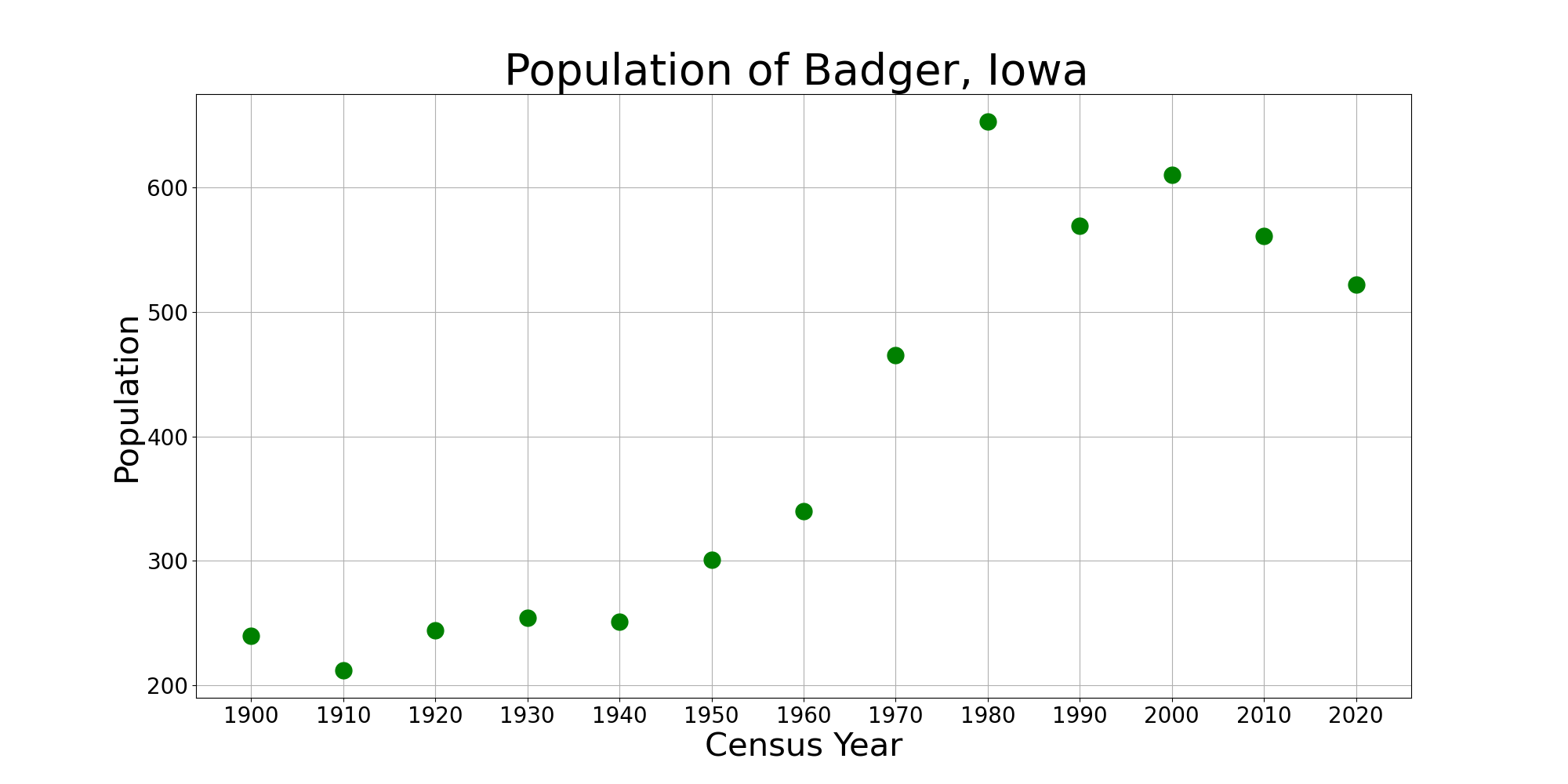
The population of Badger, Iowa from US census data

=== 2020 census ===
As of the census of 2020, there were 522 people, 223 households, and 152 families residing in the city. The population density was 463.9 inhabitants per square mile (179.1/km^{2}). There were 229 housing units at an average density of 203.5 per square mile (78.6/km^{2}). The racial makeup of the city was 91.0% White, 0.0% Black or African American, 0.0% Native American, 0.8% Asian, 0.0% Pacific Islander, 2.7% from other races and 5.6% from two or more races. Hispanic or Latino persons of any race comprised 4.2% of the population.

Of the 223 households, 28.7% of which had children under the age of 18 living with them, 52.0% were married couples living together, 9.0% were cohabitating couples, 22.0% had a female householder with no spouse or partner present and 17.0% had a male householder with no spouse or partner present. 31.8% of all households were non-families. 25.6% of all households were made up of individuals, 13.0% had someone living alone who was 65 years old or older.

The median age in the city was 42.0 years. 23.0% of the residents were under the age of 20; 5.6% were between the ages of 20 and 24; 23.8% were from 25 and 44; 28.4% were from 45 and 64; and 19.3% were 65 years of age or older. The gender makeup of the city was 49.2% male and 50.8% female.

=== 2010 census ===
As of the census of 2010, there were 561 people, 215 households, and 163 families living in the city. The population density was 514.7 inhabitants per square mile (198.7/km^{2}). There were 229 housing units at an average density of 210.1 per square mile (81.1/km^{2}). The racial makeup of the city was 97.7% White, 0.4% African American, 0.2% Native American, 0.2% Asian, and 1.6% from two or more races. Hispanic or Latino of any race were 1.2% of the population.

There were 215 households, of which 37.2% had children under the age of 18 living with them, 63.3% were married couples living together, 7.4% had a female householder with no husband present, 5.1% had a male householder with no wife present, and 24.2% were non-families. 20.9% of all households were made up of individuals, and 8.4% had someone living alone who was 65 years of age or older. The average household size was 2.61 and the average family size was 3.03.

The median age in the city was 38.7 years. 26.9% of residents were under the age of 18; 8.1% were between the ages of 18 and 24; 26.4% were from 25 to 44; 26% were from 45 to 64; and 12.7% were 65 years of age or older. The gender makeup of the city was 49.4% male and 50.6% female.

=== 2000 census ===
As of the census of 2000, there were 610 people, 227 households, and 172 families living in the city. The population density was 360.7 inhabitants per square mile (139.3/km^{2}). There were 232 housing units at an average density of 137.2 per square mile (53.0/km^{2}). The racial makeup of the city was 99.67% White, and 0.33% from two or more races. Hispanic or Latino of any race were 0.49% of the population.

There were 227 households, out of which 41.4% had children under the age of 18 living with them, 64.3% were married couples living together, 8.4% had a female householder with no husband present, and 24.2% were non-families. 19.8% of all households were made up of individuals, and 11.9% had someone living alone who was 65 years of age or older. The average household size was 2.69 and the average family size was 3.10.

30.0% were under the age of 18, 7.7% from 18 to 24, 27.9% from 25 to 44, 21.6% from 45 to 64, and 12.8% were 65 years of age or older. The median age was 33 years. For every 100 females, there were 100.0 males. For every 100 females age 18 and over, there were 95.9 males.

The median income for a household in the city was $41,250, and the median income for a family was $46,250. Males had a median income of $35,000 versus $21,458 for females. The per capita income for the city was $15,573. About 6.1% of families and 7.8% of the population were below the poverty line, including 11.2% of those under age 18 and 6.3% of those age 65 or over.

== Education ==
Badger is within the Fort Dodge Community School District. Badger residents are zoned to Cooper Elementary School. The district's sole secondary schools are Fort Dodge Middle School and Fort Dodge Senior High School.

In 2018 the district opted to assign Badger to Cooper during its elementary school boundary adjustments.
