= Vincent, Iowa =

- City
- Location of Vincent, Iowa
- Coordinates: 42°35′31″N 94°01′08″W
- Country: United States
- State: Iowa
- County: Webster

Area
  - Total: 0.26 sq mi (0.67 km^{2})
  - Land: 0.26 sq mi (0.67 km^{2})
  - Water: 0 sq mi (0.00 km^{2})
- Elevation: 1,135 ft (346 m)

Population (2020)
  - Total: 130
  - Density: 505.4/sq mi (195.15/km^{2})
- Time zone: UTC-6 (Central (CST))
  - Summer (DST): UTC-5 (CDT)
- ZIP code: 50594
- Area code: 515
- FIPS code: 19-81075
- GNIS feature ID: 2397144
- Website: www.cityofvincent.org

Vincent is a city in Webster County, Iowa, United States. The population was 130 at the time of the 2020 census.

== Geography ==
According to the United States Census Bureau, the city has a total area of 0.26 square miles (0.67 km^{2}), all land.

== Demographics ==
Historical populations
Year	Pop.	±%
1900	163	—
1910	215	+31.9%
1920	182	−15.3%
1930	194	+6.6%
1940	192	−1.0%
1950	193	+0.5%
1960	173	−10.4%
1970	204	+17.9%
1980	207	+1.5%
1990	185	−10.6%
2000	158	−14.6%
2010	174	+10.1%
2020	130	−25.3%
Source:"U.S. Census website". United States Census Bureau. and Iowa Data Center; Source: U.S. Decennial Census

=== 2020 census ===
As of the census of 2020, there were 130 people, 64 households, and 44 families residing in the city. The population density was 505.4 inhabitants per square mile (195.1/km^{2}). There were 73 housing units at an average density of 283.8 per square mile (109.6/km^{2}). The racial makeup of the city was 96.9% White, 0.0% Black or African American, 0.0% Native American, 0.0% Asian, 0.0% Pacific Islander, 0.0% from other races and 3.1% from two or more races. Hispanic or Latino persons of any race comprised 0.0% of the population.

Of the 64 households, 34.4% of which had children under the age of 18 living with them, 51.6% were married couples living together, 4.7% were cohabitating couples, 20.3% had a female householder with no spouse or partner present and 23.4% had a male householder with no spouse or partner present. 31.2% of all households were non-families. 28.1% of all households were made up of individuals, 12.5% had someone living alone who was 65 years old or older.

The median age in the city was 49.3 years. 17.7% of the residents were under the age of 20; 4.6% were between the ages of 20 and 24; 21.5% were from 25 and 44; 37.7% were from 45 and 64; and 18.5% were 65 years of age or older. The gender makeup of the city was 50.8% male and 49.2% female.

=== 2010 census ===
As of the census of 2010, there were 174 people, 73 households, and 47 families living in the city. The population density was 669.2 inhabitants per square mile (258.4/km^{2}). There were 73 housing units at an average density of 280.8 units per square mile (108.4 units/km^{2}). The racial makeup of the city was 94.3% White, 0.6% Asian, 2.9% from other races, and 2.3% from two or more races. Hispanic or Latino of any race were 6.3% of the population.

There were 73 households, of which 28.8% had children under the age of 18 living with them, 54.8% were married couples living together, 5.5% had a female householder with no husband present, 4.1% had a male householder with no wife present, and 35.6% were non-families. 28.8% of all households were made up of individuals, and 9.6% had someone living alone who was 65 years of age or older. The average household size was 2.38 and the average family size was 2.94.

The median age in the city was 40 years. 23% of residents were under the age of 18; 13.3% were between the ages of 18 and 24; 22.4% were from 25 to 44; 26.4% were from 45 to 64; and 14.9% were 65 years of age or older. The gender makeup of the city was 54.6% male and 45.4% female.

=== 2000 census ===
As of the census of 2000, there were 158 people, 67 households, and 46 families living in the city. The population density was 708.5 inhabitants per square mile (273.6/km^{2}). There were 71 housing units at an average density of 318.4 units per square mile (122.9 units/km^{2}). The racial makeup of the city was 100.00% White.

There were 67 households, out of which 31.3% had children under the age of 18 living with them, 65.7% were married couples living together, 3.0% had a female householder with no husband present, and 29.9% were non-families. 29.9% of all households were made up of individuals, and 11.9% had someone living alone who was 65 years of age or older. The average household size was 2.36 and the average family size was 2.91.

In the city, the population was spread out, with 24.7% under the age of 18, 5.1% from 18 to 24, 25.3% from 25 to 44, 29.7% from 45 to 64, and 15.2% who were 65 years of age or older. The median age was 40 years. For every 100 females, there were 105.2 males. For every 100 females age 18 and over, there were 101.7 males.

The median income for a household in the city was $32,500, and the median income for a family was $46,250. Males had a median income of $32,143 versus $21,250 for females. The per capita income for the city was $16,341. About 4.8% of families and 6.2% of the population were below the poverty line, including 5.0% of those under the age of eighteen and none of those 65 or over.

== Education ==
The Eagle Grove Community School District serves children from PreK to 12th grade. The district covers area of Wright, Humboldt, and Webster counties, and serves the communities of Eagle Grove, Thor, Vincent, Woolstock, and the surrounding rural areas.
