= Otho, Iowa =

- City
- Location of Otho, Iowa
- Coordinates: 42°25′20″N 94°08′58″W
- Country: USA
- State: Iowa
- County: Webster

Area
  - Total: 0.44 sq mi (1.15 km^{2})
  - Land: 0.44 sq mi (1.15 km^{2})
  - Water: 0 sq mi (0.00 km^{2})
- Elevation: 1,122 ft (342 m)

Population (2020)
  - Total: 429
  - Density: 969.0/sq mi (374.13/km^{2})
- Time zone: UTC-6 (Central (CST))
  - Summer (DST): UTC-5 (CDT)
- ZIP code: 50569
- Area code: 515
- FIPS code: 19-60105
- GNIS feature ID: 2396102
- Website: othoia.govoffice2.com

Otho is a city in Webster County, Iowa, United States. The population was 429 at the time of the 2020 census.

== Geography ==
According to the United States Census Bureau, the city has a total area of 0.46 square miles (1.19 km^{2}), all land.

== Demographics ==
Historical populations
Year	Pop.	±%
1960	593	—
1970	581	−2.0%
1980	692	+19.1%
1990	529	−23.6%
2000	571	+7.9%
2010	542	−5.1%
2020	429	−20.8%
Source:"U.S. Census website". United States Census Bureau. and Iowa Data Center; Source: U.S. Decennial Census

=== 2020 census ===
As of the census of 2020, there were 429 people, 226 households, and 120 families residing in the city. The population density was 969.0 inhabitants per square mile (374.1/km^{2}). There were 245 housing units at an average density of 553.4 per square mile (213.7/km^{2}). The racial makeup of the city was 93.7% White, 0.5% Black or African American, 0.9% Native American, 0.0% Asian, 0.0% Pacific Islander, 1.2% from other races and 3.7% from two or more races. Hispanic or Latino persons of any race comprised 3.5% of the population.

Of the 226 households, 22.6% of which had children under the age of 18 living with them, 36.3% were married couples living together, 10.2% were cohabitating couples, 24.8% had a female householder with no spouse or partner present and 28.8% had a male householder with no spouse or partner present. 46.9% of all households were non-families. 40.3% of all households were made up of individuals, 17.7% had someone living alone who was 65 years old or older.

The median age in the city was 47.8 years. 16.8% of the residents were under the age of 20; 4.9% were between the ages of 20 and 24; 25.2% were from 25 and 44; 31.0% were from 45 and 64; and 22.1% were 65 years of age or older. The gender makeup of the city was 52.2% male and 47.8% female.

=== 2010 census ===
As of the census of 2010, there were 542 people, 237 households, and 152 families living in the city. The population density was 1,178.3 inhabitants per square mile (454.9/km^{2}). There were 260 housing units at an average density of 565.2 per square mile (218.2/km^{2}). The racial makeup of the city was 97.6% White, 0.6% African American, 0.4% Native American, 0.2% Pacific Islander, 0.6% from other races, and 0.7% from two or more races. Hispanic or Latino of any race were 2.0% of the population.

There were 237 households, of which 28.7% had children under the age of 18 living with them, 50.2% were married couples living together, 8.9% had a female householder with no husband present, 5.1% had a male householder with no wife present, and 35.9% were non-families. 29.1% of all households were made up of individuals, and 12.7% had someone living alone who was 65 years of age or older. The average household size was 2.29 and the average family size was 2.80.

The median age in the city was 42.6 years. 22.1% of residents were under the age of 18; 8.5% were between the ages of 18 and 24; 22.2% were from 25 to 44; 30.3% were from 45 to 64; and 17% were 65 years of age or older. The gender makeup of the city was 52.2% male and 47.8% female.

=== 2000 census ===
As of the census of 2000, there were 571 people, 240 households, and 155 families living in the city. The population density was 1,281.2 inhabitants per square mile (494.7/km^{2}). There were 245 housing units at an average density of 549.7 per square mile (212.2/km^{2}). The racial makeup of the city was 97.20% White, 1.23% African American, 0.18% Native American, 0.18% Asian, 0.18% from other races, and 1.05% from two or more races. Hispanic or Latino of any race were 0.88% of the population.

There were 240 households, out of which 30.4% had children under the age of 18 living with them, 54.2% were married couples living together, 7.1% had a female householder with no husband present, and 35.4% were non-families. 30.0% of all households were made up of individuals, and 12.9% had someone living alone who was 65 years of age or older. The average household size was 2.38 and the average family size was 2.96.

26.3% were under the age of 18, 7.2% from 18 to 24, 27.5% from 25 to 44, 25.4% from 45 to 64, and 13.7% were 65 years of age or older. The median age was 39 years. For every 100 females, there were 100.4 males. For every 100 females age 18 and over, there were 97.7 males.

The median income for a household in the city was $34,318, and the median income for a family was $43,750. Males had a median income of $30,179 versus $22,375 for females. The per capita income for the city was $14,907. About 7.2% of families and 9.5% of the population were below the poverty line, including 11.6% of those under age 18 and 12.8% of those age 65 or over.

== Education ==
Otho is within the Fort Dodge Community School District. Otho residents are zoned to Butler Elementary School. The district's sole secondary schools are Fort Dodge Middle School and Fort Dodge Senior High School.
