= Barnum, Iowa =

- City
- Location of Barnum, Iowa
- Coordinates: 42°30′22″N 94°21′56″W
- Country: USA
- State: Iowa
- County: Webster

Area
  - Total: 0.37 sq mi (0.96 km^{2})
  - Land: 0.37 sq mi (0.96 km^{2})
  - Water: 0 sq mi (0.00 km^{2})
- Elevation: 1,171 ft (357 m)

Population (U.S. Census, 2020)
  - Total: 175
  - Density: 472.1/sq mi (182.29/km^{2})
- Time zone: UTC-6 (Central (CST))
  - Summer (DST): UTC-5 (CDT)
- ZIP code: 50518
- Area code: 515
- FIPS code: 19-04645
- GNIS feature ID: 2394068

Barnum is a city in Webster County, Iowa, United States, just off U.S. Route 20. The population is currently 175 in 2026 according to the last U.S. Census (2020).

== Geography ==
According to the United States Census Bureau, the city has an area of 0.37 square miles (0.96 km^{2}), all land.

Barnum lies at the southeastern margin (rim) of Manson crater, an impact structure buried by glacial till and outwash.

== Demographics ==
Historical populations
Year	Pop.	±%
1900	175	—
1910	154	−12.0%
1920	137	−11.0%
1930	148	+8.0%
1940	184	+24.3%
1950	193	+4.9%
1960	154	−20.2%
1970	147	−4.5%
1980	198	+34.7%
1990	174	−12.1%
2000	195	+12.1%
2010	191	−2.1%
2020	175	−8.4%
Source:"U.S. Census website". United States Census Bureau. and Iowa Data Center; Source: U.S. Decennial Census

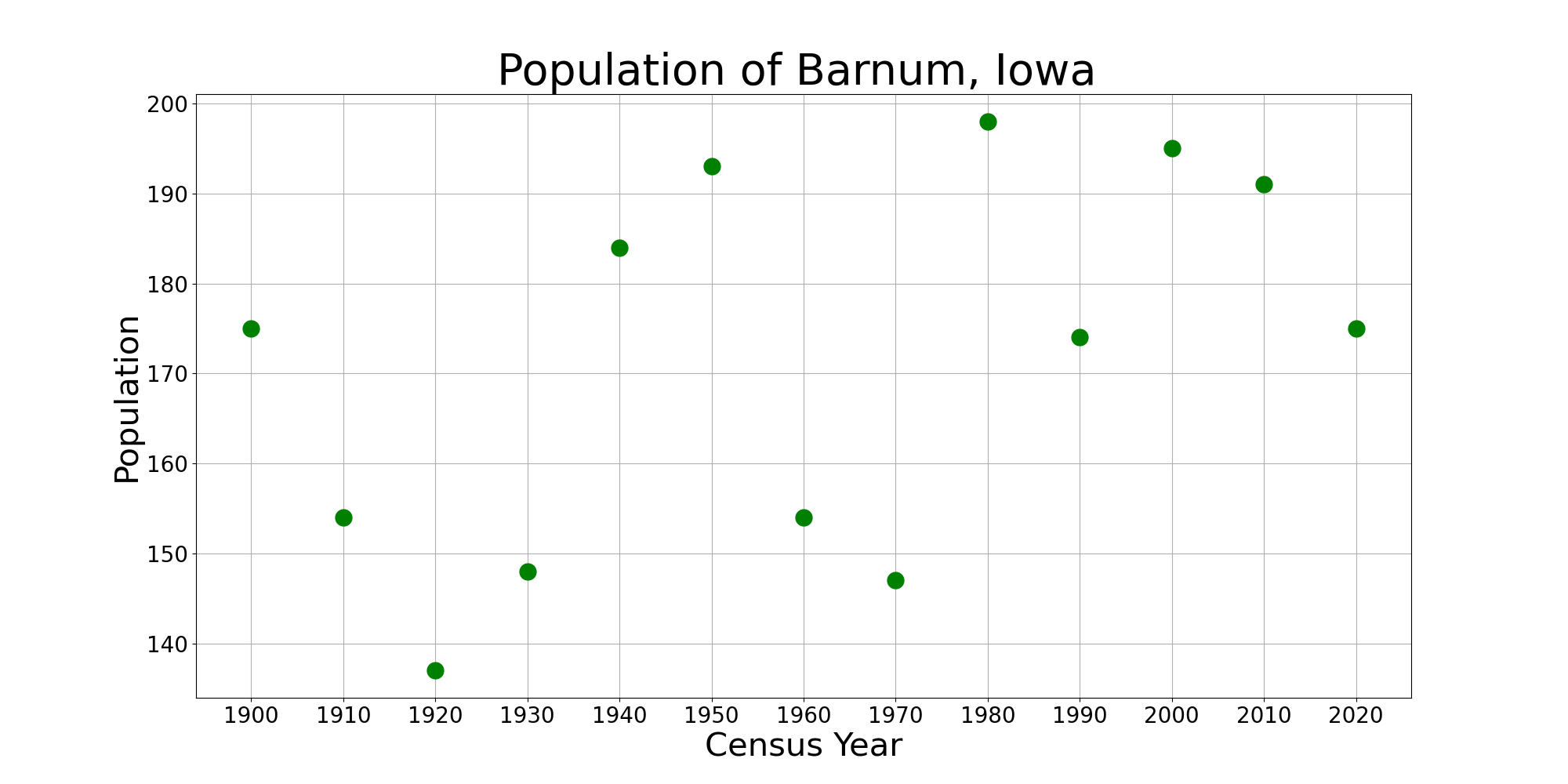
The population of Barnum, Iowa from US census data

=== 2020 census ===
As of the census of 2020, there were 175 people, 70 households, and 49 families residing in the city. The population density was 467.4 inhabitants per square mile (180.4/km^{2}). There were 71 housing units at an average density of 189.6 per square mile (73.2/km^{2}). The racial makeup of the city was 92.0% White, 0.6% Black or African American, 0.6% Native American, 0.0% Asian, 0.0% Pacific Islander, 0.6% from other races and 6.3% from two or more races. Hispanic or Latino persons of any race comprised 2.3% of the population.

Of the 70 households, 38.6% of which had children under the age of 18 living with them, 55.7% were married couples living together, 14.3% were cohabitating couples, 8.6% had a female householder with no spouse or partner present and 21.4% had a male householder with no spouse or partner present. 30.0% of all households were non-families. 18.6% of all households were made up of individuals, 7.1% had someone living alone who was 65 years old or older.

The median age in the city was 36.5 years. 29.1% of the residents were under the age of 20; 4.6% were between the ages of 20 and 24; 23.4% were from 25 and 44; 27.4% were from 45 and 64; and 15.4% were 65 years of age or older. The gender makeup of the city was 58.9% male and 41.1% female.

=== 2010 census ===
As of the census of 2010, there were 191 people, 73 households, and 53 families living in the city. The population density was 516.2 inhabitants per square mile (199.3/km^{2}). There were 77 housing units at an average density of 208.1 per square mile (80.3/km^{2}). The racial makeup of the city was 98.4% White, 1.0% from other races, and 0.5% from two or more races. Hispanic or Latino of any race were 1.0% of the population.

There were 73 households, of which 41.1% had children under the age of 18 living with them, 54.8% were married couples living together, 9.6% had a female householder with no husband present, 8.2% had a male householder with no wife present, and 27.4% were non-families. 24.7% of all households were made up of individuals, and 10.9% had someone living alone who was 65 years of age or older. The average household size was 2.62 and the average family size was 3.13.

The median age in the city was 36.5 years. 30.4% of residents were under the age of 18; 8.8% were between the ages of 18 and 24; 22.5% were from 25 to 44; 26.2% were from 45 to 64; and 12% were 65 years of age or older. The gender makeup of the city was 55.5% male and 44.5% female.

=== 2000 census ===
As of the census of 2000, there were 195 people, 67 households, and 51 families living in the city. The population density was 615.9 inhabitants per square mile (237.8/km^{2}). There were 70 housing units at an average density of 221.1 per square mile (85.4/km^{2}). The racial makeup of the city was 100.00% White. Hispanic or Latino of any race were 1.03% of the population.

There were 67 households, out of which 58.2% had children under the age of 18 living with them, 58.2% were married couples living together, 11.9% had a female householder with no husband present, and 22.4% were non-families. 17.9% of all households were made up of individuals, and 3.0% had someone living alone who was 65 years of age or older. The average household size was 2.91 and the average family size was 3.33.

In the city, the population was spread out, with 38.5% under the age of 18, 5.1% from 18 to 24, 35.9% from 25 to 44, 14.9% from 45 to 64, and 5.6% who were 65 years of age or older. The median age was 28 years. For every 100 females, there were 103.1 males. For every 100 females age 18 and over, there were 87.5 males.

The median income for a household in the city was $40,000, and the median income for a family was $42,083. Males had a median income of $25,417 versus $20,313 for females. The per capita income for the city was $12,252. About 12.2% of families and 9.7% of the population were below the poverty line, including 12.3% of those under the age of eighteen and 57.1% of those 65 or over.

== Education ==
Barnum lies within the Manson–Northwest Webster Community School District, and houses the district's elementary school.

The district was established on July 1, 1993, with the merger of the Manson and Northwest Webster districts.
