= Burnside Township =

Burnside Township may refer to:

- Burnside Township, Webster County, Iowa
- Burnside Township, Michigan
- Burnside Township, Clearfield County, Pennsylvania
- Burnside Township, Centre County, Pennsylvania
