= Coalville, Iowa =

- CDP
- Location of Coalville, Iowa
- Coordinates: 42°26′25″N 94°07′34″W
- Country: USA
- State: Iowa
- County: Webster

Area
  - Total: 2.26 sq mi (5.85 km^{2})
  - Land: 2.18 sq mi (5.65 km^{2})
  - Water: 0.073 sq mi (0.19 km^{2})
- Elevation: 1,112 ft (339 m)

Population (2020)
  - Total: 651
  - Density: 298.2/sq mi (115.15/km^{2})
- Time zone: UTC-6 (Central (CST))
  - Summer (DST): UTC-5 (CDT)
- ZIP code: 50501
- Area code: 515
- FIPS code: 19-14835
- GNIS feature ID: 2393380

Coalville is a census-designated place (CDP) in Webster County, Iowa, United States. The population was 651 at the 2020 census. The community is located on U.S. Route 20 near Fort Dodge's gypsum mines.

== History ==
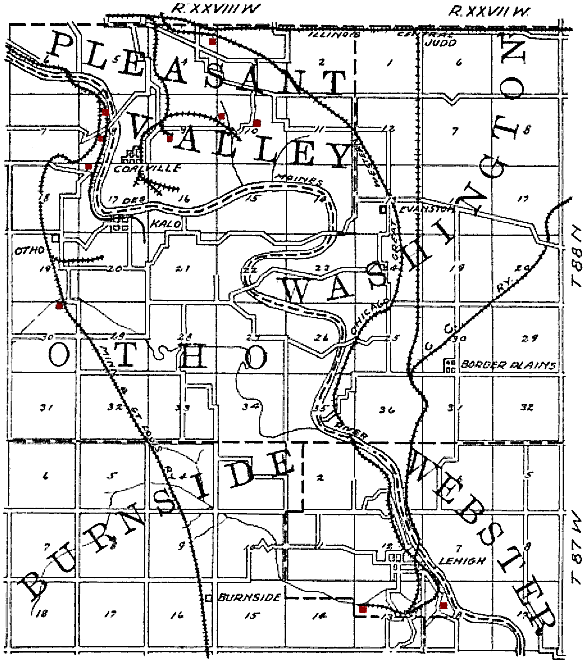
Map of the Coalville area from 1908, showing the railroads and coal mines (shown in red) of the region. Coalville is in the upper left quadrant.

Coalville takes its name from the coal mines of the area. It began as one of the northernmost coal mining towns in Iowa. Early settlers were mining coal from outcrops along the Des Moines River by 1860, and in 1870, a mine was opened on Holiday Creek, approximately one mile east of Coalville, with a three-mile tramway to the Dubuque and Sioux City Railroad (later the Illinois Central). Later in 1870, a shaft was sunk at Coalville. The Fort Dodge Coal company took over these mines and opened several more in the Coalville area. By 1880, manual labor was being augmented with machinery in these mines. In 1883, the Fort Dodge Coal company employed 350 miners to produce 30 carloads of coal daily.

The Pleasant Valley Coal Company sank a 105-foot shaft in Coalville in 1895, employing 100 men to mine a six-foot coal bed. This was mined out in the early 20th century. The Gleason Coal Company sank a shaft in 1899 that operated until 1907, producing 200,000 tons of coal over its lifetime. Gleason sank a new shaft in 1908. United Mine Workers local 392 was organized in Coalville in 1899; by 1907, it had 133 members. Mine wages varied from $1.91 to $2.56 per day.

Coalville's population was 26 in 1902. The population was 150 in 1940.

== Geography ==
Coalville is located on the East bank of the Des Moines River.

According to the United States Census Bureau, the city has a total area of 2.26 square miles (5.85 km^{2}), of which 2.18 square miles (5.66 km^{2}) of it is land and 0.07 square miles (0.19 km^{2}) is water.

== Demographics ==
Historical population
Census	Pop.	Note	%±
2010	610		—
2020	651		6.7%
U.S. Decennial Census

=== 2020 census ===
As of the census of 2020, there were 651 people, 261 households, and 171 families residing in the community. The population density was 298.2 inhabitants per square mile (115.1/km^{2}). There were 299 housing units at an average density of 137.0 per square mile (52.9/km^{2}). The racial makeup of the community was 91.7% White, 1.7% Black or African American, 0.0% Native American, 0.3% Asian, 0.0% Pacific Islander, 1.5% from other races and 4.8% from two or more races. Hispanic or Latino persons of any race comprised 4.5% of the population.

Of the 261 households, 25.7% of which had children under the age of 18 living with them, 52.1% were married couples living together, 7.7% were cohabitating couples, 16.9% had a female householder with no spouse or partner present and 23.4% had a male householder with no spouse or partner present. 34.5% of all households were non-families. 29.1% of all households were made up of individuals, 16.5% had someone living alone who was 65 years old or older.

The median age in the community was 38.2 years. 27.6% of the residents were under the age of 20; 6.0% were between the ages of 20 and 24; 23.8% were from 25 and 44; 25.5% were from 45 and 64; and 17.1% were 65 years of age or older. The gender makeup of the community was 51.6% male and 48.4% female.

=== 2010 census ===
As of the census of 2010, there were 610 people, 267 households, and 173 families residing in the town. The population density was 279.2 inhabitants per square mile (107.8/km^{2}). There were 289 housing units at an average density of 132.3 per square mile (51.1/km^{2}). The racial makeup of the town was 92.8% White, 1.6% African American, 0.5% Native American, 0.2% Asian, 0.3% from other races, and 4.6% from two or more races. Hispanic or Latino of any race were 3.1% of the population.

There were 267 households, out of which 26.2% had children under the age of 18 living with them, 51.7% were married couples living together, 7.5% had a female householder with no husband present, 5.6% had a male householder with no wife present, and 35.2% were non-families. 29.6% of all households were made up of individuals, and 10.1% had someone living alone who was 65 years of age or older. The average household size was 2.28 and the average family size was 2.79.

In the city, the population was spread out, with 23.6% under the age of 18, 6.2% from 18 to 24, 23.3% from 25 to 44, 32.1% from 45 to 64, and 14.8% who were 65 years of age or older. The median age was 42.6 years. The gender makeup of the city was 50.3% male and 49.7% female.

The median income for a household in the CDP was $43,750, and the median income for a family was $45,096. Males had a median income of $33,846 versus $20,855 for females. The per capita income for the CDP was $17,178. None of the families and 2.6% of the population were living below the poverty line, including no under eighteens and 17.8% of those over 64.

== Education ==
The Fort Dodge Community School District operates the schools serving the CDP. Butler Elementary School is the designated elementary school. Fort Dodge Middle School and Fort Dodge Senior High School are the district's secondary schools.

== See also ==
- Woodman Hollow State Preserve
