= Clare, Iowa =

City in Iowa, United States

- City
- Location of Clare, Iowa
- Coordinates: 42°35′15″N 94°20′40″W
- Country: USA
- State: Iowa
- County: Webster
- Incorporated: 1882

Area
  - Total: 0.49 sq mi (1.28 km^{2})
  - Land: 0.49 sq mi (1.28 km^{2})
  - Water: 0 sq mi (0.00 km^{2})
- Elevation: 1,214 ft (370 m)

Population (2020)
  - Total: 136
  - Density: 274.3/sq mi (105.92/km^{2})
- Time zone: UTC-6 (CST)
  - Summer (DST): UTC-5 (CDT)
- ZIP code: 50524
- Area code: 515
- FIPS code: 19-13485
- GNIS feature ID: 2393530

Clare is a city in Webster County, Iowa, United States. The population was 136 at the 2020 census. Clare was settled c. 1882 by immigrants from County Clare, Ireland. Clare is also home to a United States post office on West Front St.

== Geography ==
According to the United States Census Bureau, the city has a total area of 0.51 square miles (1.32 km^{2}), all land.

Clare lies within the eastern side of Manson crater, an impact structure buried by glacial till and outwash.

== Demographics ==
Historical population
Census	Pop.	Note	%±
1900	374		—
1910	299		−20.1%
1920	259		−13.4%
1930	254		−1.9%
1940	232		−8.7%
1950	179		−22.8%
1960	245		36.9%
1970	249		1.6%
1980	229		−8.0%
1990	161		−29.7%
2000	190		18.0%
2010	146		−23.2%
2020	136		−6.8%
U.S. Decennial Census

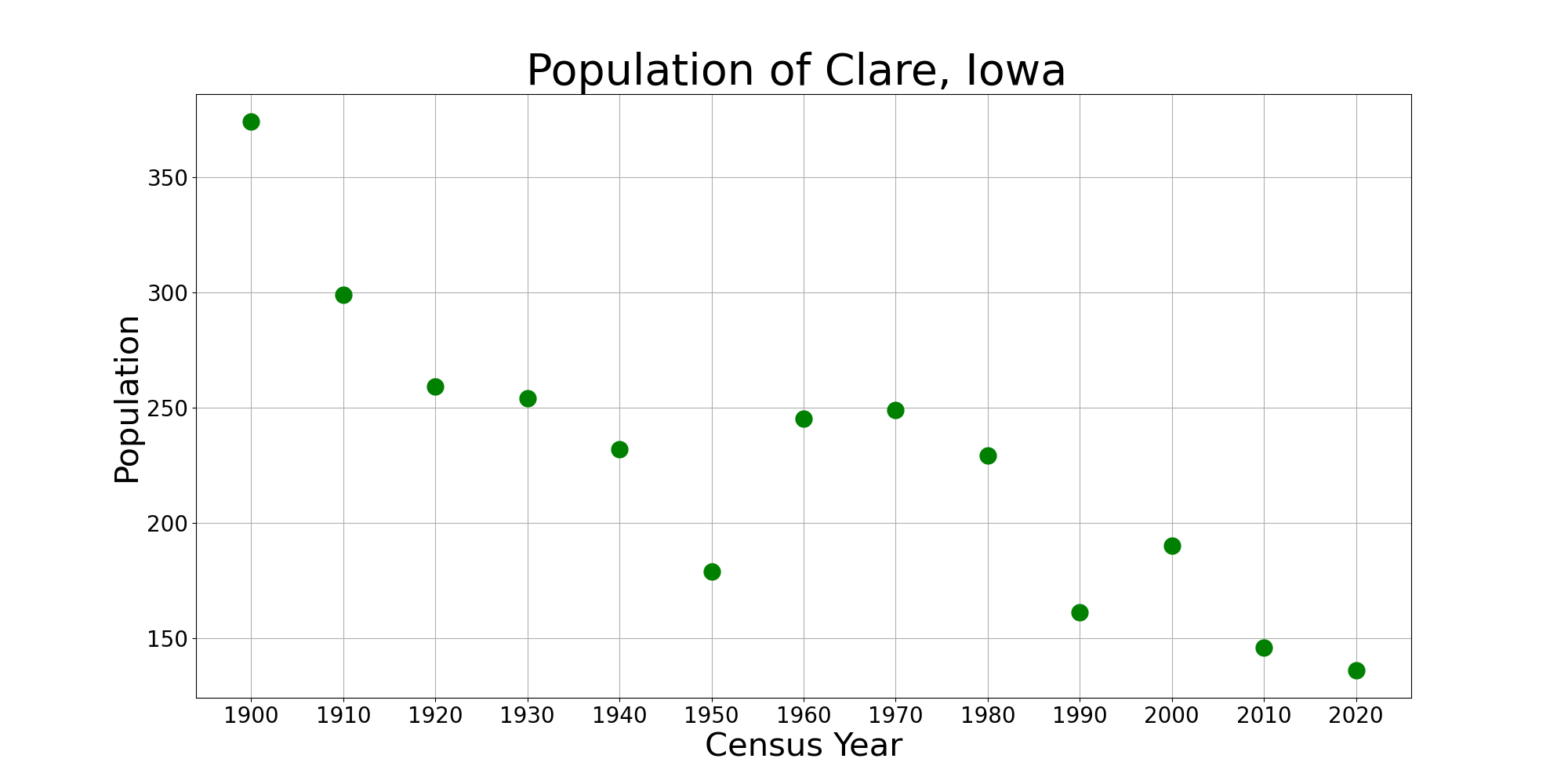
The population of Clare, Iowa, from US census data

=== 2020 census ===
As of the census of 2020, there were 136 people, 51 households, and 37 families residing in the city. The population density was 274.3 inhabitants per square mile (105.9/km^{2}). There were 68 housing units at an average density of 137.2 per square mile (53.0/km^{2}). The racial makeup of the city was 94.1% White, 0.0% Black or African American, 1.5% Native American, 0.0% Asian, 0.0% Pacific Islander, 0.7% from other races and 3.7% from two or more races. Hispanic or Latino persons of any race comprised 1.5% of the population.

Of the 51 households, 25.5% of which had children under the age of 18 living with them, 60.8% were married couples living together, 2.0% were cohabitating couples, 13.7% had a female householder with no spouse or partner present and 23.5% had a male householder with no spouse or partner present. 27.5% of all households were non-families. 27.5% of all households were made up of individuals, 17.6% had someone living alone who was 65 years old or older.

The median age in the city was 37.8 years. 25.7% of the residents were under the age of 20; 5.1% were between the ages of 20 and 24; 25.7% were from 25 and 44; 19.1% were from 45 and 64; and 24.3% were 65 years of age or older. The gender makeup of the city was 55.9% male and 44.1% female.

=== 2010 census ===
As of the census of 2010, there were 146 people, 65 households, and 41 families living in the city. The population density was 286.3 inhabitants per square mile (110.5/km^{2}). There were 74 housing units at an average density of 145.1 per square mile (56.0/km^{2}). The racial makeup of the city was 97.3% White, 2.1% African American, and 0.7% from other races. Hispanic or Latino of any race were 1.4% of the population.

There were 65 households, of which 21.5% had children under the age of 18 living with them, 53.8% were married couples living together, 7.7% had a female householder with no husband present, 1.5% had a male householder with no wife present, and 36.9% were non-families. 30.8% of all households were made up of individuals, and 15.4% had someone living alone who was 65 years of age or older. The average household size was 2.25 and the average family size was 2.80.

The median age in the city was 42.5 years. 19.2% of residents were under the age of 18; 9% were between the ages of 18 and 24; 23.2% were from 25 to 44; 30% were from 45 to 64; and 18.5% were 65 years of age or older. The gender makeup of the city was 53.4% male and 46.6% female.

=== 2000 census ===
As of the census of 2000, there were 190 people, 79 households, and 50 families living in the city. The population density was 374.4 inhabitants per square mile (144.6/km^{2}). There were 79 housing units at an average density of 155.7 per square mile (60.1/km^{2}). The racial makeup of the city was 98.42% White, 0.53% Native American, and 1.05% from two or more races.

There were 79 households, out of which 29.1% had children under the age of 18 living with them, 50.6% were married couples living together, 3.8% had a female householder with no husband present, and 36.7% were non-families. 29.1% of all households were made up of individuals, and 15.2% had someone living alone who was 65 years of age or older. The average household size was 2.41 and the average family size was 3.00.

In the city, the population was spread out, with 25.3% under the age of 18, 8.9% from 18 to 24, 23.7% from 25 to 44, 25.3% from 45 to 64, and 16.8% who were 65 years of age or older. The median age was 41 years. For every 100 females, there were 106.5 males. For every 100 females age 18 and over, there were 108.8 males.

The median income for a household in the city was $24,500, and the median income for a family was $40,000. Males had a median income of $31,875 versus $20,833 for females. The per capita income for the city was $13,838. None of the families and 6.0% of the population were living below the poverty line.

== Education ==
The Manson–Northwest Webster Community School District serves the community. It was established on July 1, 1993, with the merger of the Manson and Northwest Webster districts.
