= Eagle Grove Community School District =

Public school district in Eagle Grove, Iowa, United States

Coordinates: 42.667001°N 93.904959°W

Location
- Eagle Grove, Iowa Wright, Humboldt, and Webster counties United States
- Coordinates: 42.667001, -93.904959

District information
- Type: Local school district
- Grades: K–12
- Superintendent: Jess Toliver
- Schools: 3
- Budget: $17,176,000 (2020-21)
- NCES District ID: 1909990

Students and staff
- Students: 1000 (2022-23)
- Teachers: 78.96 FTE
- Staff: 93.93 FTE
- Student–teacher ratio: 12.66
- Athletic conference: Top of Iowa
- District mascot: Eagles
- Colors: Purple and Gold

Other information
- Website: www.eagle-grove.k12.ia.us

The Eagle Grove Community School District is a rural public school district headquartered in Eagle Grove, Iowa.

The district covers area of Wright, Humboldt, and Webster counties. and serves Eagle Grove, Thor, Vincent, Woolstock, and the surrounding rural areas.

Jess Toliver has been the superintendent since 2009. On December 26, 2018, his home was destroyed by a fire. The family was home, but managed to escape the fire.

During a broadcast of a high school basketball game between Eagle Grove and Forest City on November 28, 2017, two employees were recorded making racist comments regarding some Eagle Grove players who they perceived to be "Español people", saying they were foreigners who should "go back where they came from." The superintendent was issued an apology, and the two employees were fired from the KIOW radio in Forest City.

In 2018, Wright County awarded $1.5 Million in TIF funds to Eagle Grove to help fund a $6 million addition to the elementary school, leading the superintendent of the Belmond–Klemme Community School District to criticize the decision, as he felt Eagle Grove was being favored over the other districts in the county.

== Schools ==
The district operates three schools, in one facility in Eagle Grove:

- Eagle Grove Elementary School
- Eagle Grove Middle School
- Eagle Grove High School

== See also ==
- List of school districts in Iowa
