= Dayton Township, Webster County, Iowa =

Coordinates: 42.62°N 94.14°W

Dayton Township
- Township
- Country: United States
- State: Iowa
- County: Webster County
- Established: September 14, 1858
- Time zone: UTC-6 (CST)
  - Summer (DST): UTC-5 (CDT)

Dayton Township is a township in Webster County, Iowa.
