= Fort Dodge Senior High School =

Public secondary school in Fort Dodge, Iowa, United States

Location
- 819 North 25th Street; Fort Dodge, Iowa 50501; United States
- 42.513°N 94.163°W

Information
- Type: Public high school
- School district: Fort Dodge Community School District
- Superintendent: Josh Porter
- Principal: Staci Laird
- Teaching staff: 57.23 (FTE)
- Grades: 9–12
- Enrollment: 1,057 (2023-2024)
- Student to teacher ratio: 18.47
- Colors: Crimson and black
- Nickname: Dodgers
- Rival: Mason City
- Newspaper: Little Dodger
- Yearbook: Big Dodger
- Website: www.fdschools.org/page/fort-dodge-senior-high

Fort Dodge Senior High School (commonly abbreviated FDSH) is the only public high school in Fort Dodge, Iowa, United States. The school is located in the north-central part of Fort Dodge between Martin Luther King Drive and North 25th Street. It is a part of the Fort Dodge Community School District (FDCSD).

In addition to Fort Dodge, Badger and Otho are in the district boundaries, and therefore the high school's attendance boundaries. The district also serves the Coalville census-designated place.

== History ==
Currently covering 248,300 square feet (23,070 m^{2}), Fort Dodge Senior High School was built in 1958, replacing the 1922 building. The swimming pool and additional physical education areas were completed in 1974. The last addition, the vocational area, was completed in 1979. Its open-floor design and industrial-style architecture is representative of the spacious neo-futuristic school designs that originated in California and other warmer climates during the middle to late 1950s. In 2008 and 2009, the kitchen, cafeteria, and surrounding sections of the interior received extensive renovations, part of a five-year plan to improve the student environment and to update the decor. The band, choir, and orchestra rooms were remodeled in 2009. Additional renovations are planned to classroom areas as well as athletic/fitness facilities. These updates are expected to cost more than $50 million and are planned to be completed in short phases over many years.

== Campus ==
In 2018 the district established a 19,865-square-foot (1,845.5 m^{2}) "Freshman Academy" to allow for easier transitions of 9th grade students to high school, with sixteen renovated classes and two classrooms placed in the library. Multiple athletic facilities were also added: a 200-seat new 9,141-square-foot (849.2 m^{2}) auxiliary gymnasium with three basketball courts and three volleyball courts; a 6,678-square-foot (620.4 m^{2}) wrestling room; as well as four locker rooms in a 11,016-square-foot (1,023.4 m^{2}) area with two each for male and female students, were established that year.

== Athletics ==
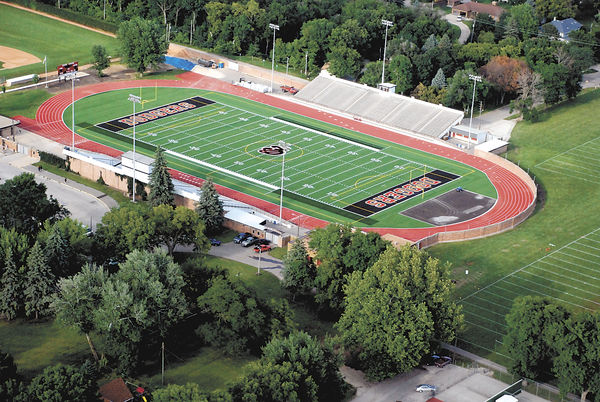
Dodger Stadium – new artificial turf installed in Summer 2008

Brick-walled Dodger Stadium is home to Fort Dodge Senior High football, baseball, soccer and track teams. It is also home to Saint Edmond Catholic High School and Iowa Central Community College football teams. It remains one of the state's best athletic facilities, with permanent seating for 5,000 in the two concrete bleacher sections. The stadium is located in the north central section of the community on an 18-acre (73,000 m^{2}) tract of land. Built in 1939–1940, Dodger Stadium is a product of President Franklin D. Roosevelt's plan to get depression-era America back to work. In 2008, the school district received just under $1,000,000 in pledges for private donations to renovate the stadium's locker rooms and grandstands and replace the natural grass playing surface with artificial turf. Work was completed on the turf in August 2008, with the inaugural game taking place on August 29, 2008. Renovation plans for the restroom and locker room areas have stalled due to lack of funding. Also included in the plan are new bleachers and a new scoreboard.

Fort Dodge Senior High School hosts the Iowa Girls' High School Athletic Union's state softball tournament and the Iowa High School Athletic Association's state cross country championships. The softball tournament is held at Harlan Rogers Sports Complex, while the cross country championships are located at Lakeside Golf Course at John F. Kennedy Park.

The Dodgers are members of the Iowa Alliance Conference, and participate in the following sports:

- Fall
  - Football
  - Volleyball
    - 2-time State Champions (1971, 1984)
  - Cross country
  - Boys' golf
  - Girls' swimming
- Winter
  - Basketball
    - Boys' 2-time State Champions (1919, 1988)
    - Girl's 1986 State Champions
  - Bowling
    - Boys' 3-time Class 2a State Champions (2015, 2020, 2023)
  - Wrestling
    - 12-time State Champions (1927, 1929, 1930, 1931, 1932, 1934, 1936, 1937, 1941, 1980, 1985, 2018)
    - 2018 Class 3A Duals Meet State Champions
  - Boys' swimming
- Spring
  - Track and field
  - Soccer
  - Tennis
  - Girls' golf
- Summer
  - Baseball
    - 1969 State Champions
  - Softball

== Music ==
Composer Karl L. King wrote and conducted the majority of his music in Fort Dodge from 1920 to 1971, making marching band a popular activity for students and the community. The All-American Dodger Marching Band performs at all varsity home football games and competes in several regional field marching competitions throughout the year. The marching band performed during halftime of the 2010 Alamo Bowl in San Antonio, Texas and the 2014 Outback Bowl in Tampa, Florida.

A Cappella Choir, a concert choir for mixed voices, was founded in 1931. The choir has traveled and performed throughout the United States. The choir program offers four curricular choirs, two extra-curricular choirs, independent study in composition, and music appreciation.

Every spring, FDSH's choir students perform a musical. These productions have taken place every year since 1927, making it the longest consecutively running high school musical theatre tradition in the United States. The spring of 2018 marked the 91st annual musical with the performance of Beauty and the Beast. Senior High's 90th annual musical, The Pajama Game, gained multiple recognitions from the Iowa High School Musical Theater Awards, including Outstanding Musical Production. In 1990, the A Cappella Choir performed the amateur debut of Stephen Sondheim's Into the Woods.

== Notable alumni ==
- Bill Koll - 3-time NCAA Champion wrestler, Olympian, Head Coach of Wrestling at Penn State and UNC
- Steve Stark – television producer, production manager, casting, and actor
- Lisa Uhl – elite distance runner
- Dale Warland – acclaimed choral conductor and composer

== See also ==
- List of high schools in Iowa
