= James Davis (Iowa politician) =

American politician

James Davis (26 July 1826 – 22 April 1897) was an American politician from Iowa.

Davis was born in Sullivan County, Indiana, on 26 July 1826. Aged 20, he settled in Highland Center, a community in Wapello County, and was elected to the Iowa Senate as a Whig from District 4 in 1846. He stepped down from the state senate at the end of his term in 1848. Davis married Rhoda Stephens on 23 September 1858. The couple had three children. He died on 22 April 1897.
