= Duncombe, Iowa =

- City
- Location of Duncombe, Iowa
- Coordinates: 42°28′12″N 94°00′10″W
- Country: USA
- State: Iowa
- County: Webster

Area
  - Total: 1.96 sq mi (5.08 km^{2})
  - Land: 1.96 sq mi (5.08 km^{2})
  - Water: 0 sq mi (0.00 km^{2})
- Elevation: 1,109 ft (338 m)

Population (2020)
  - Total: 381
  - Density: 194.1/sq mi (74.95/km^{2})
- Time zone: UTC-6 (Central (CST))
  - Summer (DST): UTC-5 (CDT)
- ZIP code: 50532
- Area code: 515
- FIPS code: 19-22755
- GNIS feature ID: 2394571
- Website: cityofduncombe.com

Duncombe is a city in Webster County, Iowa, United States. The population was 381 at the time of the 2020 census.

== History ==
Duncombe is named for Hon. J. F. Duncombe.

== Geography ==
According to the United States Census Bureau, the city has a total area of 1.97 square miles (5.10 km^{2}), all land.

== Demographics ==
Historical populations
Year	Pop.	±%
1900	350	—
1910	418	+19.4%
1920	442	+5.7%
1930	354	−19.9%
1940	341	−3.7%
1950	378	+10.9%
1960	355	−6.1%
1970	418	+17.7%
1980	504	+20.6%
1990	488	−3.2%
2000	474	−2.9%
2010	410	−13.5%
2020	381	−7.1%
Source:"U.S. Census website". United States Census Bureau. and Iowa Data Center; Source: U.S. Decennial Census

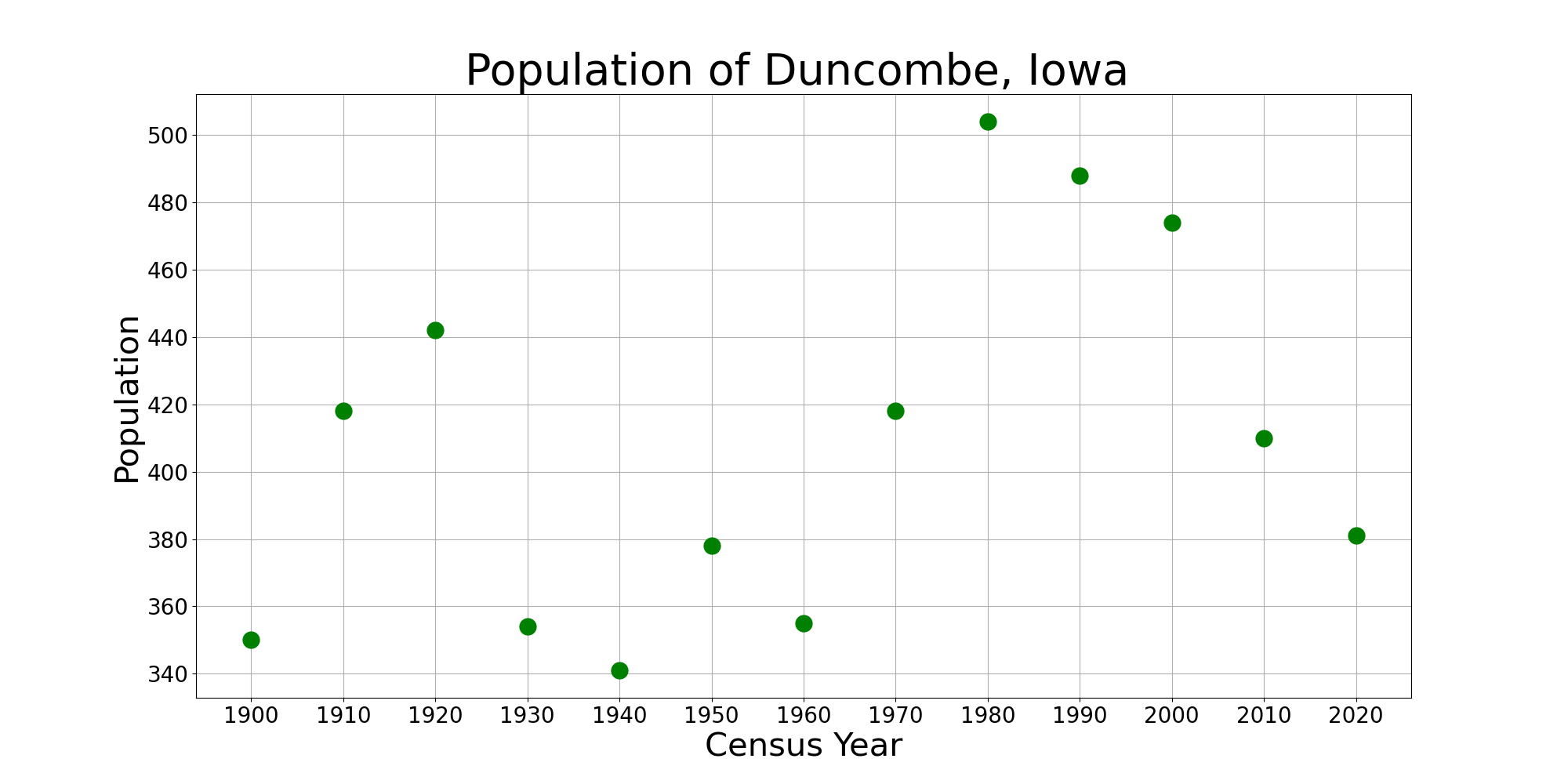
The population of Duncombe, Iowa from US census data

=== 2020 census ===
As of the census of 2020, there were 381 people, 169 households, and 99.5 families residing in the city. The population density was 194.1 inhabitants per square mile (75.0/km^{2}). There were 180 housing units at an average density of 91.7 per square mile (35.4/km^{2}). The racial makeup of the city was 92.9% White, 0.5% Black or African American, 0.0% Native American, 0.8% Asian, 0.0% Pacific Islander, 2.1% from other races and 3.7% from two or more races. Hispanic or Latino persons of any race comprised 5.5% of the population.

Of the 169 households, 25.4% of which had children under the age of 18 living with them, 36.7% were married couples living together, 11.2% were cohabitating couples, 28.4% had a female householder with no spouse or partner present and 23.7% had a male householder with no spouse or partner present. 41.4% of all households were non-families. 29.6% of all households were made up of individuals, 17.8% had someone living alone who was 65 years old or older.

The median age in the city was 40.5 years. 25.7% of the residents were under the age of 20; 6.0% were between the ages of 20 and 24; 22.3% were from 25 and 44; 28.3% were from 45 and 64; and 17.6% were 65 years of age or older. The gender makeup of the city was 51.2% male and 48.8% female.

=== 2010 census ===
As of the census of 2010, there were 410 people, 180 households, and 109 families living in the city. The population density was 208.1 inhabitants per square mile (80.3/km^{2}). There were 193 housing units at an average density of 98.0 per square mile (37.8/km^{2}). The racial makeup of the city was 96.1% White, 0.5% African American, 0.7% Asian, and 2.7% from two or more races. Hispanic or Latino of any race were 1.0% of the population.

There were 180 households, of which 28.9% had children under the age of 18 living with them, 41.1% were married couples living together, 15.6% had a female householder with no husband present, 3.9% had a male householder with no wife present, and 39.4% were non-families. 31.1% of all households were made up of individuals, and 15% had someone living alone who was 65 years of age or older. The average household size was 2.28 and the average family size was 2.77.

The median age in the city was 40.5 years. 24.6% of residents were under the age of 18; 8% were between the ages of 18 and 24; 24% were from 25 to 44; 27.6% were from 45 to 64; and 15.6% were 65 years of age or older. The gender makeup of the city was 48.8% male and 51.2% female.

=== 2000 census ===
As of the census of 2000, there were 474 people, 192 households, and 124 families living in the city. The population density was 241.0 inhabitants per square mile (93.1/km^{2}). There were 196 housing units at an average density of 99.6 per square mile (38.5/km^{2}). The racial makeup of the city was 98.31% White, 0.84% Native American, 0.21% Asian, and 0.63% from two or more races. Hispanic or Latino of any race were 0.63% of the population.

There were 192 households, out of which 32.3% had children under the age of 18 living with them, 52.6% were married couples living together, 9.4% had a female householder with no husband present, and 35.4% were non-families. 29.2% of all households were made up of individuals, and 15.1% had someone living alone who was 65 years of age or older. The average household size was 2.47 and the average family size was 3.09.

In the city, the population was spread out, with 26.6% under the age of 18, 8.9% from 18 to 24, 29.5% from 25 to 44, 19.4% from 45 to 64, and 15.6% who were 65 years of age or older. The median age was 36 years. For every 100 females, there were 88.8 males. For every 100 females age 18 and over, there were 91.2 males.

The median income for a household in the city was $34,750, and the median income for a family was $41,591. Males had a median income of $29,107 versus $23,958 for females. The per capita income for the city was $14,915. About 3.3% of families and 7.7% of the population were below the poverty line, including 6.8% of those under age 18 and 17.9% of those age 65 or over.

== Education ==
Webster City Community School District operates area public schools.
