= Moorland, Iowa =

- City
- Location of Moorland, Iowa
- Coordinates: 42°26′30″N 94°17′43″W
- Country: USA
- State: Iowa
- County: Webster

Area
  - Total: 1.49 sq mi (3.86 km^{2})
  - Land: 1.49 sq mi (3.86 km^{2})
  - Water: 0 sq mi (0.00 km^{2})
- Elevation: 1,148 ft (350 m)

Population (2020)
  - Total: 168
  - Density: 112.8/sq mi (43.56/km^{2})
- Time zone: UTC-6 (Central (CST))
  - Summer (DST): UTC-5 (CDT)
- ZIP code: 50566
- Area code: 515
- FIPS code: 19-53895
- GNIS feature ID: 2395394

Moorland is a small city in Webster County, Iowa, United States. The population was 168 at the time of the 2020 census.

== Geography ==
According to the United States Census Bureau, the city has a total area of 1.48 square miles (3.83 km^{2}), all land.

== Demographics ==
Historical populations
Year	Pop.	±%
1910	137	—
1920	181	+32.1%
1930	179	−1.1%
1940	215	+20.1%
1950	248	+15.3%
1960	281	+13.3%
1970	269	−4.3%
1980	257	−4.5%
1990	209	−18.7%
2000	197	−5.7%
2010	169	−14.2%
2020	168	−0.6%
Source:"U.S. Census website". United States Census Bureau. and Iowa Data Center; Source: U.S. Decennial Census

=== 2020 census ===
As of the census of 2020, there were 168 people, 74 households, and 41 families residing in the city. The population density was 112.8 inhabitants per square mile (43.6/km^{2}). There were 81 housing units at an average density of 54.4 per square mile (21.0/km^{2}). The racial makeup of the city was 91.7% White, 0.6% Black or African American, 0.0% Native American, 0.6% Asian, 0.0% Pacific Islander, 1.8% from other races and 5.4% from two or more races. Hispanic or Latino persons of any race comprised 2.4% of the population.

Of the 74 households, 25.7% of which had children under the age of 18 living with them, 43.2% were married couples living together, 12.2% were cohabitating couples, 17.6% had a female householder with no spouse or partner present and 27.0% had a male householder with no spouse or partner present. A total of 44.6% of all households were non-families. 32.4% of all households were made up of individuals, and 9.5% had someone living alone who was 65 years old or older.

The median age in the city was 40.0 years. 23.8% of the residents were under the age of 20; 5.4% were between the ages of 20 and 24; 26.8% were from 25 and 44; 26.2% were from 45 and 64; and 17.9% were 65 years of age or older. The gender makeup of the city was 52.4% male and 47.6% female.

=== 2010 census ===
As of the census of 2010, there were 169 people, 77 households, and 50 families living in the city. The population density was 114.2 inhabitants per square mile (44.1/km^{2}). There were 85 housing units at an average density of 57.4 per square mile (22.2/km^{2}). The racial makeup of the city was 99.4% White and 0.6% from two or more races. Hispanic or Latino of any race were 1.8% of the population.

There were 77 households, of which 24.7% had children under the age of 18 living with them, 45.5% were married couples living together, 7.8% had a female householder with no husband present, 11.7% had a male householder with no wife present, and 35.1% were non-families. 33.8% of all households were made up of individuals, and 10.4% had someone living alone who was 65 years of age or older. The average household size was 2.19 and the average family size was 2.74.

The median age in the city was 46.1 years. 19.5% of residents were under the age of 18; 8.8% were between the ages of 18 and 24; 20.7% were from 25 to 44; 34.3% were from 45 to 64; and 16.6% were 65 years of age or older. The gender makeup of the city was 53.3% male and 46.7% female.

=== 2000 census ===
As of the census of 2000, there were 197 people, 81 households, and 57 families living in the city. The population density was 197.1 inhabitants per square mile (76.1/km^{2}). There were 83 housing units at an average density of 83.0 per square mile (32.0/km^{2}). The racial makeup of the city was 98.48% White, 0.51% from other races, and 1.02% from two or more races. Hispanic or Latino of any race were 2.03% of the population.

There were 81 households, out of which 30.9% had children under the age of 18 living with them, 58.0% were married couples living together, 7.4% had a female householder with no husband present, and 29.6% were non-families. 27.2% of all households were made up of individuals, and 11.1% had someone living alone who was 65 years of age or older. The average household size was 2.43 and the average family size was 2.84.

In the city, the population was spread out, with 25.9% under the age of 18, 9.1% from 18 to 24, 24.4% from 25 to 44, 27.4% from 45 to 64, and 13.2% who were 65 years of age or older. The median age was 39 years. For every 100 females, there were 93.1 males. For every 100 females age 18 and over, there were 94.7 males.

The median income for a household in the city was $43,750, and the median income for a family was $51,875. Males had a median income of $32,188 versus $25,417 for females. The per capita income for the city was $16,051. About 3.7% of families and 6.6% of the population were below the poverty line, including 9.8% of those under the age of eighteen and 8.3% of those 65 or over.

== Education ==
It is in the Southeast Valley Community School District. Southeast Valley High School in Gowrie is that district's comprehensive high school.

Moorland was served by the Prairie Valley Community School District, which formed on July 1, 1993, with the merger of the Cedar Valley Community School District and the Prairie Community School District. In 2023 that district merged into the Southeast Valley district.
