= Fort Dodge Community School District =

Public school district in Fort Dodge, Iowa, United States

Coordinates: 42.504774°N 94.175370°W

Location
- Fort Dodge, Iowa Webster County United States
- Coordinates: 42.504774, -94.175370

District information
- Type: Local school district
- Grades: K-12
- Superintendent: Josh Porter
- Schools: 7
- Budget: $61,703,000 (2020-21)
- NCES District ID: 1911820

Students and staff
- Students: 3676 (2022-23)
- Teachers: 235.05 FTE
- Staff: 286.59 FTE
- Student–teacher ratio: 15.64
- Athletic conference: Central Iowa Metro League
- District mascot: Dodgers
- Colors: Red and Black

Other information
- Website: www.fdschools.org

Fort Dodge Community School District (FDCSD) is a public school district headquartered in Fort Dodge, Iowa.

The district is entirely in Webster County. In addition to Fort Dodge, Badger and Otho are in the district boundaries. It also serves the Coalville census-designated place.

== History ==
Jesse Ulrich became superintendent in 2018 when all members of the FDCSD school board voted to hire him.

In 2018 the district's elementary school boundaries were modified. That year it also placed an enrollment cap in its elementary schools. Butler and Duncombe elementaries however would have eight extra spaces for new students who move into their attendance zones, while Cooper and Feelhaver each have four.

== Schools ==
Secondary

- Fort Dodge Senior High School
- Fort Dodge Middle School

Elementary

- Butler Elementary School
- Cooper Elementary School
- Duncombe Elementary School
  - In 2018, the school had about 350 students. The current 65,342-square-foot (6,070.5 m^{2}) facility, with a capacity of 450, began construction in 2016 and opened in 2018; the Fair Oaks Middle School building housed Duncombe students during construction.
- Feelhaver Elementary School

Preschool

- Riverside Early Learning Center

== See also ==
- List of school districts in Iowa
