= Fort Dodge Regional Airport =

Airport in Iowa, United States

- IATA: FOD; ICAO: KFOD; FAA LID: FOD

Summary
- Airport type: Public
- Owner: City of Fort Dodge
- Serves: Fort Dodge, Iowa
- Elevation AMSL: 1,156 ft (352 m)
- Coordinates: 42°33′04″N 094°11′31″W
- Website: www.fortdodgeiowa.org

Map
- Location of airport in Iowa FOD (the United States)

Runways
Direction	Length		Surface
Direction	ft	m	Surface
6/24	6,547	1,996	Asphalt
12/30	5,301	1,616	Asphalt

Statistics (2023)
- Aircraft operations (year ending 3/1/2023): 10,598
- Based aircraft (2023): 22
- Departing passengers (12 months ending July 2020): 5,590
- Source: Federal Aviation Administration

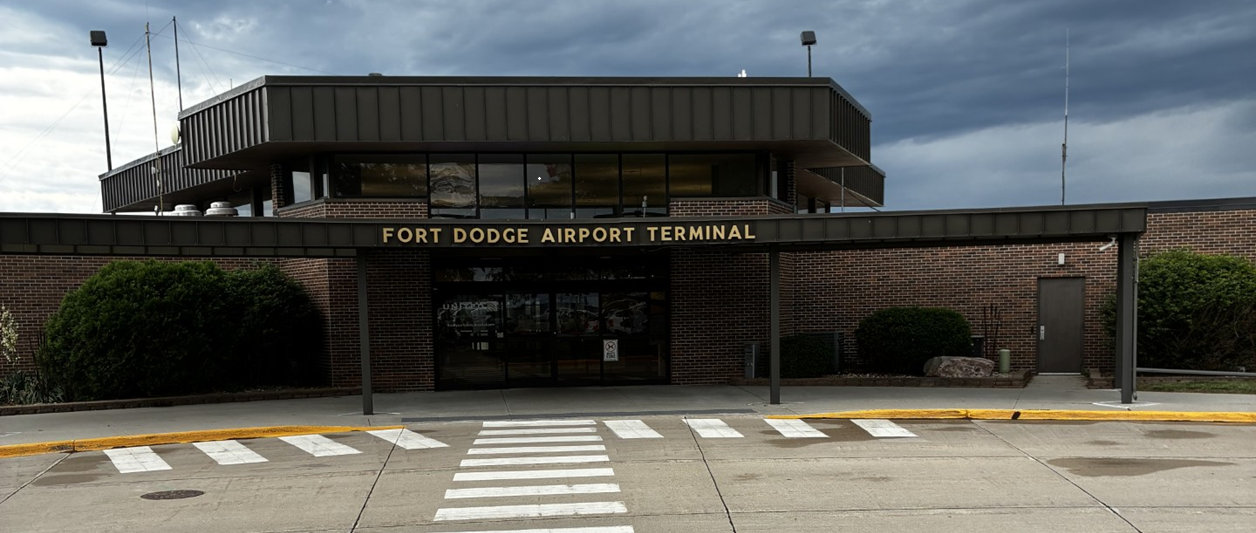
Fort Dodge airport terminal

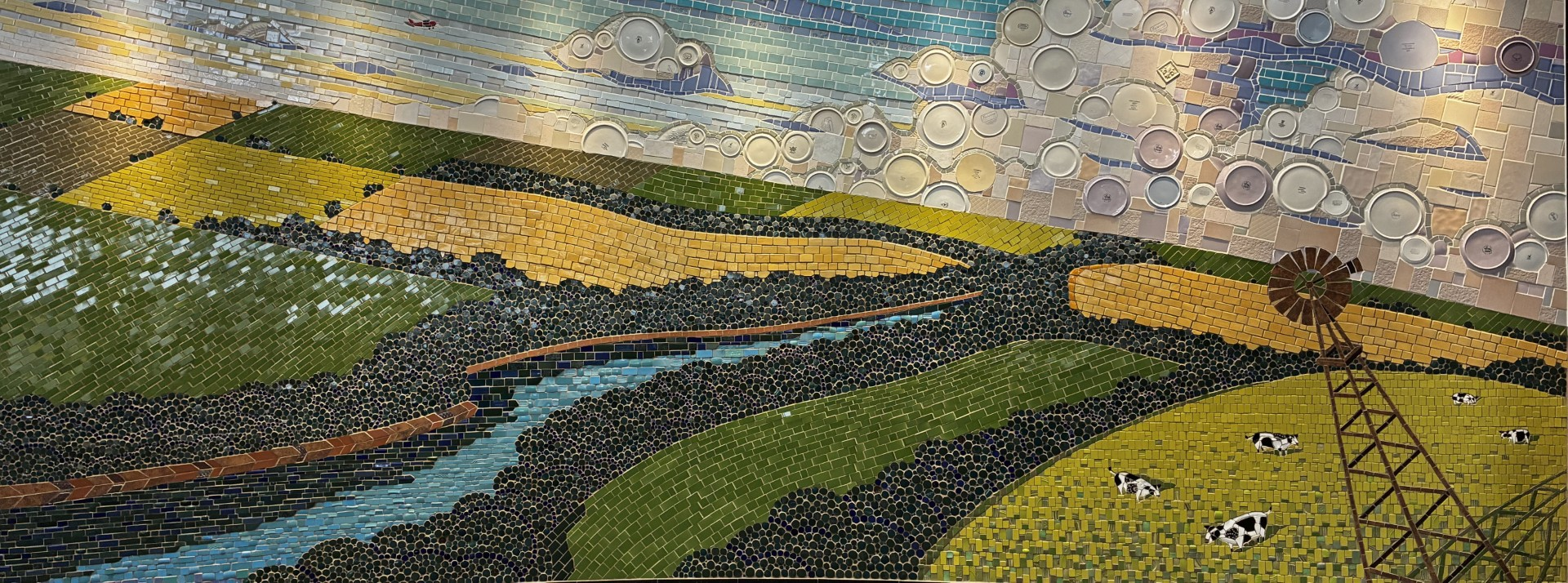
Fort Dodge airport mosaic mural

Fort Dodge Regional Airport (IATA: FOD, ICAO: KFOD, FAA LID: FOD) is a city owned public use airport located three nautical miles (6 km) north of the central business district of Fort Dodge, a city in Webster County, Iowa, United States. It is mostly used for general aviation, but is also served by one commercial airline United Airlines, a service that is subsidized by the federal government's Essential Air Service program at a cost of $3,892,174 (per year).

The National Plan of Integrated Airport Systems for 2021–2025 categorized it as a non-primary commercial service airport.

== History ==
Mesaba Airlines, operating as Delta Connection, formerly had daily service to Minneapolis-St. Paul with a stop in Mason City. Effective June 10, 2010, the stop in Mason City ended and Fort Dodge had nonstop flights to Minneapolis-St. Paul.

Great Lakes Airlines announced began service from Fort Dodge to Minneapolis/St. Paul to replace service by Delta Connection effective April 10, 2012. Great Lakes service ended January 31, 2014.

Air Choice One announced it would begin service from Fort Dodge to Chicago O'Hare to replace service by Great Lakes Airlines on February 23, 2015.

SkyWest Airlines, operating as United Express, announced that it would begin service from Fort Dodge to Chicago O'Hare to replace service by Air Choice One on March 1, 2021. Skywest also operates daily flights to and from Denver International Airport.

== Facilities and aircraft ==
Fort Dodge Regional Airport covers an area of 967 acres (391 ha) at an elevation of 1,156 feet (352 m) above mean sea level. It has two asphalt paved runways: 6/24 is 6,547 by 150 feet (1,996 x 46 m) and 12/30 is 5,301 by 100 feet (1,616 x 30 m).

For the 12-month period ending March 1, 2023, the airport had 10,598 aircraft operations, an average of 29 per day: 85% general aviation, 12% scheduled commercial, 2% air taxi and 1% military. In March 2023, there were 22 aircraft based at this airport: 19 single-engine, 2 multi-engine and 1 helicopter.

== Airline and destination ==
Airlines	Destinations
United Express	Chicago–O'Hare

Destinations map
Destinations from Fort Dodge Regional Airport
Red = Year-round destination
Green = Seasonal destination
Blue = Future destination

=== Statistics ===
Carrier shares: January 2025 - December 2025
Carrier	Passengers (arriving and departing)
SkyWest Airlines	17,340(100%)

Top domestic destinations: January 2025 - December 2025
Rank	City	Airport name & IATA code	Passengers
1	Chicago, IL	Chicago O'Hare (ORD)	9,010

== Recent Developments (2024–2025) ==
Fort Dodge Regional Airport saw several significant changes in 2024 and 2025: Air service operations continued under SkyWest Airlines operating as United Express, maintaining direct flights to Chicago O’Hare International Airport under a federal Essential Air Service (EAS) contract extended until March 31, 2027; former Director of Aviation Rhonda Chambers announced her retirement effective July 31, 2025, and the city began the search for her successor. Fort Dodge Regional Airport received $1.2 million in federal grants to replace outdated taxiway lighting and reconstruct two taxiways, with an additional $375,000 from the Iowa Department of Transportation for additional rehabilitation projects. With the 27th Brushy Creek Area Honour Flight set for May 7, 2025, the airport keeps providing facilities, including free parking, TSA PreCheck, and passenger services using United Airlines. Community involvement is still strong.

== See also ==
- List of airports in Iowa

== Other sources ==
- Essential Air Service documents (Docket OST-2001-10682) from the U.S. Department of Transportation:
  - Order 2005-6-13 (June 20, 2005): selecting Mesaba Aviation, Inc. d/b/a Northwest Airlink, an affiliate of Northwest Airlines, to provide subsidized Essential Air Service (EAS) for the two-year period beginning June 1, 2005, at an annual subsidy of $777,709 for Thief River Falls and a combined annual subsidy of $2,160,770 for Fort Dodge and Mason City.
  - Order 2007-6-3 (June 11, 2007): re-selecting Mesaba Aviation Inc., d/b/a Northwest Airlink, to continue to provide subsidized Essential Air Service (EAS) at Fort Dodge and Mason City, Iowa, and Thief River Falls, Minnesota, for the two-year period beginning June 1, 2007. Service will consist of 18 round trips per week at Fort Dodge and Mason City, routed Fort Dodge-Mason City-Minneapolis/St. Paul, at the combined annual subsidy rate of $21,113,865. Service at Thief River Falls will consist of 12 one-stop round trips per week to Minneapolis/St. Paul at the annual subsidy rate of $1,065,639. All service will be provided with 34-seat Saab 340 aircraft as Northwest Airlink.
  - Order 2009-4-20 (April 27, 2009): re-selecting Mesaba Aviation, Inc., d/b/a Delta Connection, to continue providing subsidized Essential Air Service (EAS) at Fort Dodge and Mason City, IA, and Thief River Falls, MN, for the two-year period beginning June 1, 2009, at the annual subsidy rates of $2,225,213 for Fort Dodge and Mason City, and $1,230,322 for Thief River Falls.
  - Order 2011-6-7 (June 8, 2011): re-selecting Mesaba Aviation, Inc., d/b/a Delta Connection, to provide Essential Air Service (EAS) at Fort Dodge and Mason City, Iowa, at annual subsidy rates of $1,910,995 and $1,017,545 at Mason City, respectively, for the five-month period June 1, 2011, through October 31, 2011.
  - Ninety Day Notice (July 15, 2011): of MESABA AVIATION, INC. and PINNACLE AIRLINES, INC. of termination of service at Fort Dodge, IA
  - Order 2011-11-30 (November 23, 2011): selecting Great Lakes Aviation, Ltd., to provide Essential Air Service (EAS) at six communities at the following annual subsidy rates: Brainerd, Minnesota, $959,865; Fort Dodge, $1,798,693; Iron Mountain, $1,707,841; Mason City, $1,174,468; Thief River Falls, Minnesota, $1,881,815; and Watertown, $1,710,324, for the two-year period beginning when Great Lakes inaugurates full EAS at all six communities
  - Great Lakes Airlines press release (January 27, 2014): Effective February 1, 2014, Great Lakes Airlines will be suspending service from Devils Lake and Jamestown, ND; Fort Dodge and Mason City, IA; Ironwood, MI; and Thief River Falls, MN due to the severe industry-wide pilot shortage and its relative acute impact on Great Lakes.
  - Order 2014-1-20 (January 31, 2014): requesting proposals from carriers interested in providing Essential Air Service (EAS) at Fort Dodge and/or Mason City, Iowa. The communities will be without air service effective February 1, 2014.
  - Order 2014-4-26 (April 24, 2014): directing interested persons to show cause as to why the Department should not terminate the eligibility ... under the Essential Air Service (EAS) program based on criteria passed by Congress in the FAA Modernization and Reform Act of 2012 (Public Law No. 112-95). We find that Fort Dodge is within 175 miles of a large or medium hub, Omaha Airport-Eppley Airfield (OMA), a medium hub, and, thus, is subject to the 10-enplanement statutory criterion. We also find that during fiscal year 2013, Fort Dodge generated a total of 5,868 passengers (inbound plus outbound). Consistent with the methodology described above, that results in an average of 9.4 enplanements per day, below the 10-enplanement statutory criterion necessary to remain eligible in the EAS program.
