= Newark Township, Webster County, Iowa =

Coordinates: 42.62°N 94.14°W

Newark Township
- Township
- Country: United States
- State: Iowa
- County: Webster County
- Time zone: UTC-6 (CST)
  - Summer (DST): UTC-5 (CDT)

Newark Township is a township in Webster County, Iowa.
