= Webster County, Iowa =

County in Iowa, United States

- County
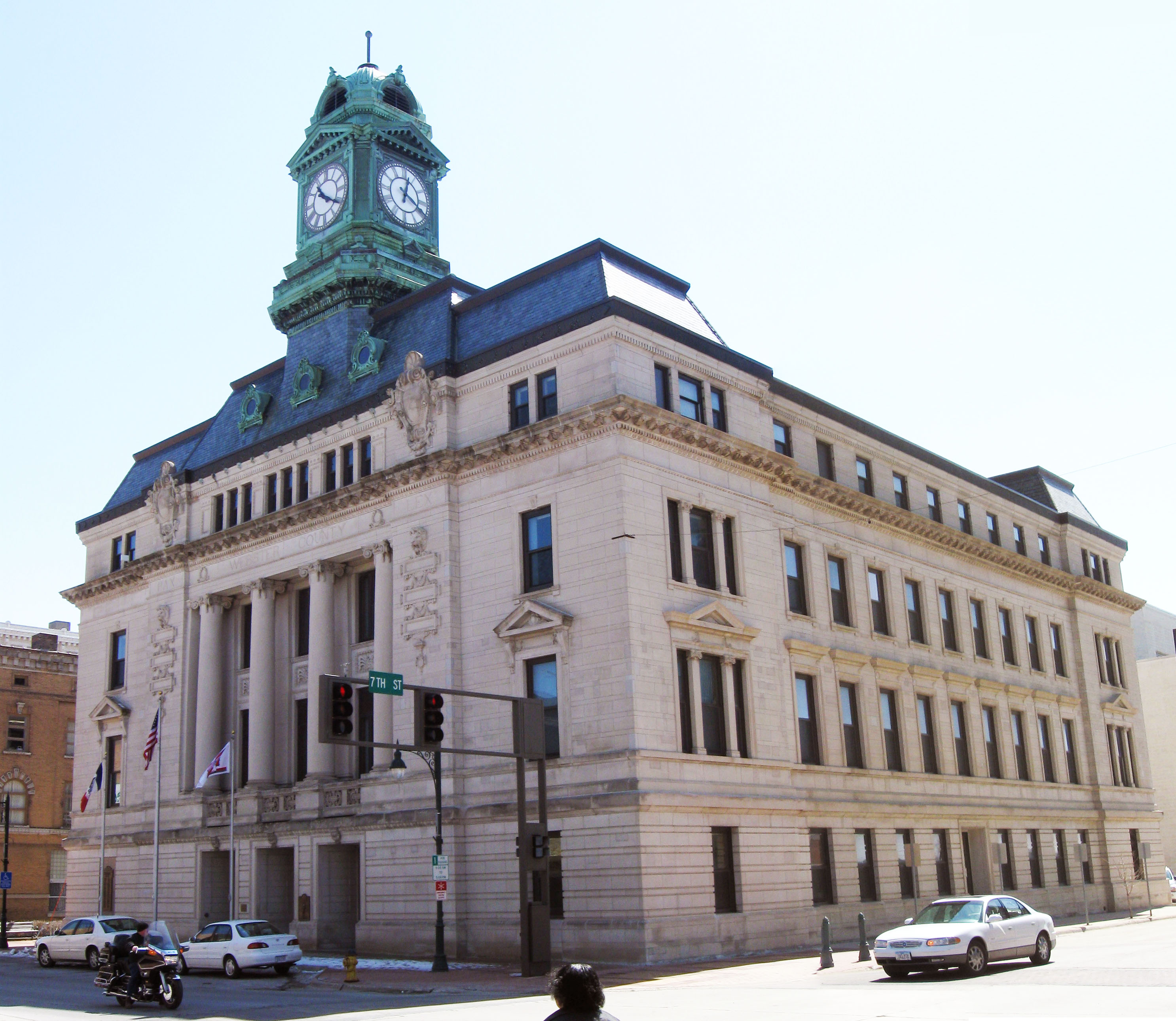
- The courthouse in Fort Dodge is on the NRHP.

- Location within the U.S. state of Iowa
- Coordinates: 42°25′34″N 94°11′19″W
- Country: United States
- State: Iowa
- Founded: January 15, 1851
- Named for: Daniel Webster
- Seat: Fort Dodge
- Largest city: Fort Dodge

Area
  - Total: 718 sq mi (1,860 km^{2})
  - Land: 716 sq mi (1,850 km^{2})
  - Water: 2.8 sq mi (7.3 km^{2}) 0.4%

Population (2020)
  - Total: 36,999
  - Estimate (2025): 36,838 ▼
  - Density: 51.7/sq mi (20.0/km^{2})
- Time zone: UTC−6 (Central)
  - Summer (DST): UTC−5 (CDT)
- Congressional district: 4th
- Website: www.webstercountyia.gov
- Iowa county number 94

Webster County is a county in the U.S. state of Iowa. As of the 2020 census, the population was 36,999. The county seat is Fort Dodge. The county was established in January 1851, one of 43 counties established by a legislative package. This county was named after Daniel Webster, an American statesman noted for his moving oratory.

Webster County comprises the Fort Dodge, IA Micropolitan statistical area.

== Geography ==
According to the United States Census Bureau, the county has an area of 718 square miles (1,860 km^{2}), of which 716 square miles (1,850 km^{2}) is land and 2.8 square miles (7.3 km^{2}) (0.4%) is water.

=== Major highways ===
- U.S. Highway 20 – runs east–west across central Webster County, through Moorland and Coalville.
- U.S. Highway 169 – enters northern Webster County at mid-county and runs south to Harcourt. It runs four miles east, then turns south to exit the county.
- Iowa Highway 7 – enters western Webster County running east from Manson. It runs east to its terminus at US Highway 169 at Fort Dodge.
- Iowa Highway 175 – enters southeastern Webster County, running west from Stratford. It runs west and south–north to its connection to US Highway 169, four miles east of Harcourt.
- Iowa Highway 144 – enters southern Webster County near its midpoint. It runs north to its connection to Iowa Highway 175, three miles west of Harcourt.

=== Transit ===
- Dodger Area Rapid Transit

=== Airport ===
The Fort Dodge Regional Airport (FOD) is located just north of Fort Dodge. It is primarily a general aviation airport. Daily direct flights are operated to Lambert-St. Louis International Airport and Minneapolis-Saint Paul International Airport, with connecting service through Mason City to Chicago O'Hare International Airport.

=== Adjacent counties ===
- Boone County (southeast)
- Calhoun County (west)
- Greene County (southwest)
- Hamilton County (east)
- Humboldt County (north)
- Pocahontas County (northwest)
- Wright County (northeast)

== Demographics ==
Historical population
Census	Pop.	Note	%±
1860	2,504		—
1870	10,484		318.7%
1880	15,951		52.1%
1890	21,582		35.3%
1900	31,757		47.1%
1910	34,629		9.0%
1920	37,611		8.6%
1930	40,425		7.5%
1940	41,521		2.7%
1950	44,241		6.6%
1960	47,810		8.1%
1970	48,391		1.2%
1980	45,953		−5.0%
1990	40,342		−12.2%
2000	40,235		−0.3%
2010	38,013		−5.5%
2020	36,999		−2.7%
2025 (est.)	36,838	▼	−0.4%
U.S. Decennial Census; 1790–1960 1900–1990; 1990–2000 2010–2020

=== 2020 census ===
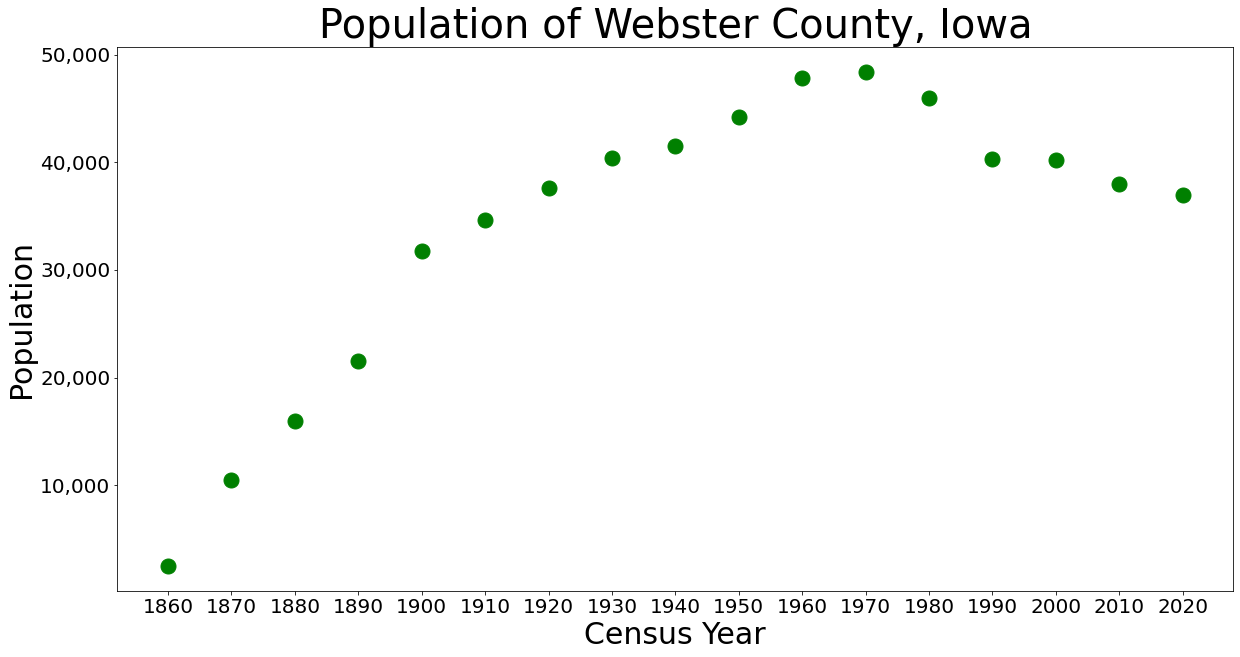
Population of Webster County from the U.S. census data

As of the 2020 census, the county had a population of 36,999 and a population density of 51.5/sq mi (19.9/km^{2}). The median age was 40.2 years, with 21.1% of residents under the age of 18 and 19.8% 65 years of age or older.

For every 100 females there were 107.3 males, and for every 100 females age 18 and over there were 107.1 males age 18 and over.

The racial makeup was 86.8% White, 4.9% Black or African American, 0.5% American Indian and Alaska Native, 0.8% Asian, <0.1% Native Hawaiian and Pacific Islander, 1.8% from some other race, and 5.1% from two or more races. Hispanic or Latino residents of any race comprised 5.6% of the population.

Webster County Racial Composition
Race	Number	Percent
White (NH)	31,372	84.8%
Black or African American (NH)	1,773	4.8%
Native American (NH)	112	0.3%
Asian (NH)	295	0.8%
Pacific Islander (NH)	16	0.04%
Other/Mixed (NH)	1,368	3.7%
Hispanic or Latino	2,063	5.6%

The county's DHC data show that 66.8% of residents lived in urban areas while 33.2% lived in rural areas, and 94.86% reported being of one race.

There were 15,046 households in the county, of which 25.8% had children under the age of 18 living in them. Of all households, 42.7% were married-couple households, 21.9% were households with a male householder and no spouse or partner present, and 27.8% were households with a female householder and no spouse or partner present. About 35.1% of all households were made up of individuals and 15.5% had someone living alone who was 65 years of age or older.

There were 16,937 housing units, of which 11.2% were vacant. Among occupied housing units, 70.0% were owner-occupied and 30.0% were renter-occupied. The homeowner vacancy rate was 2.1% and the rental vacancy rate was 14.6%.

=== 2010 census ===
As of the 2010 census recorded a population of 38,013 in the county, with a population density of 53.1/sq mi (20.5/km^{2}). There were 17,035 housing units, of which 15,580 were occupied.

=== 2000 census ===
As of the 2000 census, there were 40,235 people, 15,878 households, and 10,304 families in the county. The population density was 56 people per square mile (22 people/km^{2}). There were 16,969 housing units at an average density of 24 per square mile (9.3/km^{2}). The racial makeup of the county was 93.39% White, 3.39% Black or African American, 0.30% Native American, 0.66% Asian, 0.02% Pacific Islander, 1.10% from other races, and 1.15% from two or more races. 2.35% of the population were Hispanic or Latino of any race.

There were 15,878 households 30.20% had children under the age of 18 living with them, 51.80% were married couples living together, 9.50% had a female householder with no husband present, and 35.10% were non-families. 30.30% of households were one person and 13.10% were one person aged 65 or older. The average household size was 2.38 and the average family size was 2.97.

The age distribution was 24.50% under the age of 18, 11.10% from 18 to 24, 25.50% from 25 to 44, 21.60% from 45 to 64, and 17.40% 65 or older. The median age was 38 years. For every 100 females there were 100.30 males. For every 100 females age 18 and over, there were 98.20 males.

The median household income was $35,334 and the median family income was $43,772. Males had a median income of $31,047 versus $23,042 for females. The per capita income for the county was $17,857. About 6.70% of families and 10.00% of the population were below the poverty line, including 12.30% of those under age 18 and 7.00% of those age 65 or over.

=== Population ranking ===
The population ranking of the following table is based on the 2020 census of Webster County.

† county seat

Rank	City/Town/etc.	Municipal type	Population (2020 Census)
1	† Fort Dodge	City	24,871
2	Gowrie	City	952
3	Dayton	City	772
4	Coalville	CDP	651
5	Badger	City	522
6	Otho	City	429
7	Lehigh	City	395
8	Duncombe	City	381
9	Callender	City	368
10	Harcourt	City	264
11	Barnum	City	175
12	Moorland	City	168
13	Clare	City	136
14	Vincent	City	130
15	Stratford (mostly in Hamilton County)	City	22 (707 total)
16	Farnhamville (mostly in Calhoun County)	City	0 (383 total)

== Communities ==
=== Cities ===
- Badger
- Barnum
- Callender
- Clare
- Dayton
- Duncombe
- Fort Dodge
- Gowrie
- Harcourt
- Lehigh
- Moorland
- Otho
- Stratford (in Webster and Hamilton Counties)
- Vincent

=== Census-designated place ===
- Coalville

=== Unincorporated communities ===
- Burnside
- Judd
- Lanyon
- Lundgren
- Palm Grove
- Roelyn
- Slifer

=== Townships ===
Townships include:

- Badger
- Burnside
- Clay
- Colfax
- Cooper
- Dayton
- Deer Creek
- Douglas
- Elkhorn
- Fulton
- Gowrie
- Hardin
- Jackson
- Johnson
- Lost Grove
- Newark
- Otho
- Pleasant Valley
- Roland
- Sumner
- Wahkonsa
- Washington
- Webster
- Yell

== Education ==
School districts include:

- Eagle Grove Community School District
- Fort Dodge Community School District
- Gilmore City-Bradgate Community School District
- Humboldt Community School District
- Manson Northwest Webster Community School District
- Southeast Valley Community School District - Formed on July 1, 2023.
- Stratford Community School District
- Webster City Community School District

Former districts

- Prairie Valley Community School District - Merged into Southeast Valley on July 1, 2023.
- Southeast Webster-Grand Community School District - Merged into Southeast Valley on July 1, 2023.

== Notable people ==
- Robert Schliske, member of the Wyoming House of Representatives, 1971–1975, born in Webster County

== Politics ==
In every U.S. presidential election from 1984 to 2012, the Democratic candidate has won a majority in Webster County, but in 2016 the county voted for Republican Donald Trump by a wide margin, a nearly 27 point swing from 2012. In 2020, Trump received a larger percentage of the county's vote (over 61%) than any presidential candidate since Lyndon Johnson in 1964.

United States presidential election results for Webster County, Iowa
Year	Republican		Democratic		Third party(ies)	
Year	No.	%	No.	%	No.	%
1896	3,691	58.08%	2,557	40.24%	107	1.68%
1900	4,221	63.31%	2,266	33.99%	180	2.70%
1904	4,358	66.87%	1,714	26.30%	445	6.83%
1908	3,658	56.52%	2,374	36.68%	440	6.80%
1912	2,123	29.79%	2,370	33.25%	2,634	36.96%
1916	3,917	53.50%	3,196	43.66%	208	2.84%
1920	8,312	64.00%	2,804	21.59%	1,872	14.41%
1924	6,641	46.00%	2,076	14.38%	5,721	39.62%
1928	8,525	56.39%	6,497	42.97%	97	0.64%
1932	5,243	34.68%	8,957	59.25%	917	6.07%
1936	6,494	37.81%	9,885	57.56%	795	4.63%
1940	7,583	41.29%	10,731	58.43%	52	0.28%
1944	6,935	42.11%	9,477	57.55%	56	0.34%
1948	6,951	40.73%	9,508	55.71%	607	3.56%
1952	12,336	57.69%	8,681	40.59%	368	1.72%
1956	11,097	52.72%	9,901	47.04%	51	0.24%
1960	10,741	50.11%	10,680	49.83%	14	0.07%
1964	6,576	33.49%	13,005	66.23%	54	0.28%
1968	9,349	48.96%	8,572	44.89%	1,176	6.16%
1972	11,133	55.96%	8,358	42.01%	402	2.02%
1976	9,068	45.35%	10,543	52.73%	384	1.92%
1980	10,438	49.63%	9,001	42.80%	1,591	7.57%
1984	9,619	48.58%	9,930	50.15%	253	1.28%
1988	6,926	39.82%	10,267	59.03%	200	1.15%
1992	6,992	36.95%	8,562	45.25%	3,367	17.80%
1996	6,275	38.43%	8,380	51.32%	1,673	10.25%
2000	8,172	47.94%	8,479	49.74%	397	2.33%
2004	8,959	48.09%	9,561	51.32%	111	0.60%
2008	8,337	44.93%	9,917	53.44%	302	1.63%
2012	8,469	46.30%	9,537	52.14%	286	1.56%
2016	10,056	57.69%	6,305	36.17%	1,069	6.13%
2020	10,938	61.37%	6,613	37.11%	271	1.52%
2024	10,850	64.78%	5,641	33.68%	257	1.53%

== See also ==
- Webster County Courthouse
- National Register of Historic Places listings in Webster County, Iowa
