= Deer Creek Township, Webster County, Iowa =

Deer Creek Township, Webster County
- Township
- Coordinates: 42°36′08″N 094°16′09″W
- Country: United States
- State: Iowa
- County: Webster

Area
  - Total: 34.28 sq mi (88.79 km^{2})
  - Land: 34.12 sq mi (88.36 km^{2})
  - Water: 0.17 sq mi (0.43 km^{2})
- Elevation: 1,120 ft (340 m)

Population (2000)
  - Total: 437
  - Density: 13/sq mi (4.9/km^{2})
- FIPS code: 19-90936
- GNIS feature ID: 0467694

Deer Creek Township is one of twenty-four townships in Webster County, Iowa, USA. As of the 2000 census, its population was 437.

== Geography ==
Deer Creek Township covers an area of 34.28 square miles (88.8 km^{2}) and contains no incorporated settlements. According to the USGS, it contains one cemetery, Trinity Lutheran.
