= Badger Township, Webster County, Iowa =

Coordinates: 42.62°N 94.14°W

Badger Township
- Township
- Country: United States
- State: Iowa
- County: Webster County
- Established: October 10, 1865

Area
  - Land: 37.0 sq mi (96 km^{2})
  - Water: 0.2 sq mi (0.52 km^{2})

Population
  - Total: 314
- Time zone: UTC-6 (CST)
  - Summer (DST): UTC-5 (CDT)

Badger Township is in Webster County, Iowa, United States. The population is 1,287 with 646 males and 641 females. The land area is 37.0 square miles (96 km^{2}) and the water area 0.2 square miles (0.52 km^{2}) The township got its name from Badger Creek, which itself got its name when a group of soldiers from Fort Dodge in the early 1850s saw a badger for the first time.

The township has three cemeteries: Blossom Hill, Hovey, and Pioneer.
