= Area code 515 =

Telephone area code for north-central Iowa

Numbering plan areas of Iowa with the red area indicating area code 515

Area code 515 is a telephone area code in the North American Numbering Plan (NANP) for most of the north-central part of the U.S. state of Iowa. The numbering plan area includes Des Moines, Ames, Ankeny, Humboldt, Boone, Fort Dodge, Jefferson, Johnston, Urbandale, Algona and Indianola.

Despite its relatively low population, Iowa was originally divided into three numbering plan areas (NPAs), with each border line running roughly in north–south directions.

Area code 515 originally served the central part of the state, stretching border to border from Minnesota to Missouri. In 2000, the eastern and southern portions of the area were split off with area code 641, leaving 515 with only about one-fourth of its original area, including Des Moines and the area northwest of the city. Only one small portion in the north of the numbering plan area borders another state, Minnesota.

Prior to October 2021, area code 515 had telephone numbers assigned for the central office code 988. In 2020, 988 was designated nationwide as a dialing code for the National Suicide Prevention Lifeline, which created a conflict for exchanges that permit seven-digit dialing. This area code was therefore scheduled to transition to ten-digit dialing by October 24, 2021.

The heavy metal music band Slipknot, being from Des Moines, named the song "(515)" in the album Iowa after the area code.

Iowa area codes: 319, 515, 563, 641, 712
	North: 507/924	
West: 712	515	East: 641
	South: 641	
Minnesota area codes: 218, 320, 507/924, 612, 651, 763, 952
