= Wacousta Township, Humboldt County, Iowa =

Wacousta Township
- Township
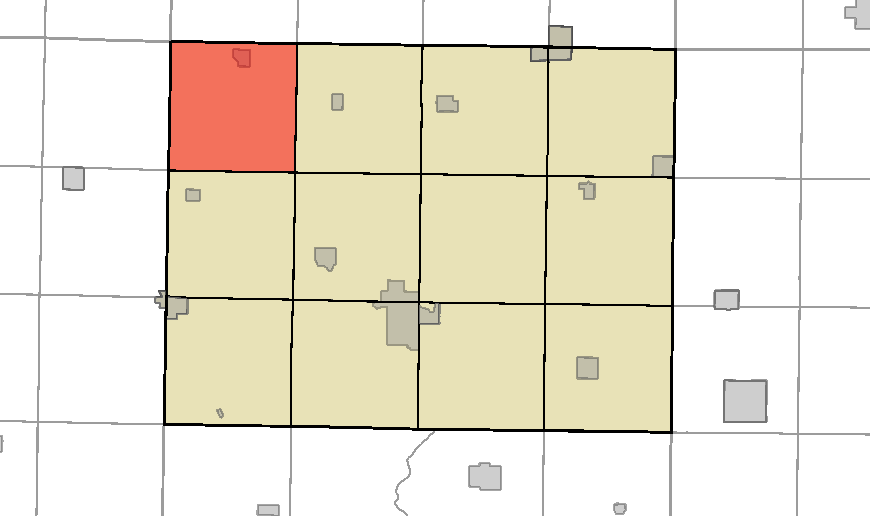
- Location in Humboldt County
- Coordinates: 42°51′40″N 94°23′18″W
- Country: United States
- State: Iowa
- County: Humboldt
- Established: 1857

Area
  - Total: 36.6 sq mi (95 km^{2})
  - Land: 36.6 sq mi (95 km^{2})
  - Water: 0.0 sq mi (0 km^{2})
- Elevation: 1,138 ft (347 m)

Population (2000)
  - Total: 246
  - Density: 7/sq mi (2.7/km^{2})
- Time zone: UTC-6 (CST)
  - Summer (DST): UTC-5 (CDT)
- ZIP codes: 50570 (Ottosen)
- GNIS feature ID: 0468877

Wacousta Township is one of twelve townships in Humboldt County, Iowa, United States. As of the 2000 census, its population was 246.

== History ==
Wacousta Township was organized in 1858.

== Geography ==
According to the United States Census Bureau, Wacousta Township covers an area of 36.6 square miles (95 km^{2}); all of this land.

=== Cities, towns, villages ===
- Ottosen

=== Adjacent townships ===
- Garfield Township, Kossuth County (north)
- Riverdale Township, Kossuth County (northeast)
- Delana Township (east)
- Rutland Township (southeast)
- Avery Township (south)
- Garfield Township, Pocahontas County (southwest)
- Des Moines Township, Pocahontas County (west)
- West Bend Township, Palo Alto County (northwest)

== Political districts ==
- Iowa's 4th congressional district
- State House District 4

== Cemeteries ==
Wacousta Township contains McKnight Cemetery and Union Cemetery, in addition to the Omer-Thorsen Farm.
