= Delana Township, Humboldt County, Iowa =

Delana Township
- Township
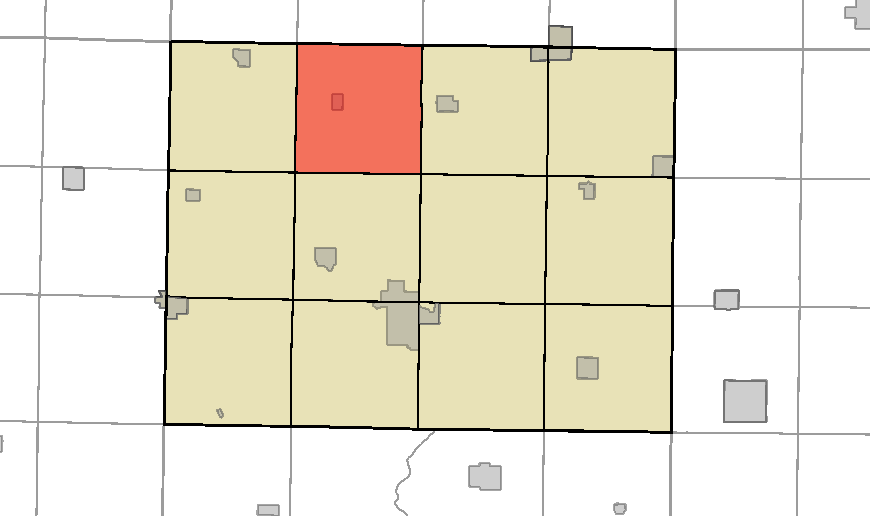
- Location in Humboldt County
- Coordinates: 42°51′50″N 94°16′17″W
- Country: United States
- State: Iowa
- County: Humboldt
- Established: 1870

Area
  - Total: 36.3 sq mi (94 km^{2})
  - Land: 36.3 sq mi (94 km^{2})
  - Water: 0.0 sq mi (0 km^{2})
- Elevation: 1,135 ft (346 m)

Population (2000)
  - Total: 532
  - Density: 15/sq mi (5.8/km^{2})
- Time zone: UTC-6 (CST)
  - Summer (DST): UTC-5 (CDT)
- ZIP codes: 50519 (Bode)
- GNIS feature ID: 0467697

Delana Township is one of twelve townships in Humboldt County, Iowa, United States. As of the 2000 census, its population was 532.

== History ==
Delana Township was organized in 1871.

== Geography ==
According to the United States Census Bureau, Delana Township covers an area of 36.3 square miles (94 km^{2}), all of this is land.

=== Cities, towns, villages ===
- Bode

=== Adjacent townships ===
- Riverdale Township, Kossuth County (north)
- Sherman Township, Kossuth County (northeast)
- Humboldt Township (east)
- Grove Township (southeast)
- Rutland Township (south)
- Avery Township (southwest)
- Wacousta Township (west)
- Garfield Township, Kossuth County (northwest)

=== Cemeteries ===
The township contains St. Olaf Cemetery, and Union Cemetery, also Bode Memorial Park.

== Political districts ==
- Iowa's 4th congressional district
- State House District 4
