= St. Joseph, Iowa =

- Census-designated place
- Location within Iowa Location within the United States
- Coordinates: 42°54′47″N 94°14′27″W
- Country: United States
- State: Iowa
- County: Kossuth
- Township: Riverdale

Area
  - Total: 0.86 sq mi (2.23 km^{2})
  - Land: 0.86 sq mi (2.23 km^{2})
  - Water: 0 sq mi (0.00 km^{2})
- Elevation: 1,142 ft (348 m)

Population (2020)
  - Total: 51
  - Density: 59.2/sq mi (22.85/km^{2})
- Time zone: Central (CST)
- ZIP code: 50519
- Area code: 515
- FIPS code: 19-70005
- GNIS feature ID: 2585486

St. Joseph or Saint Joseph is an unincorporated community and census-designated place (CDP) in Riverdale Township, Kossuth County, Iowa, United States. As of the 2020 census, St. Joseph had a population of 51.

== Geography ==
The community is located in southern Kossuth County, in the southeast part of Riverdale Township, 11 miles (18 km) south of Algona along US 169 very close to the Humboldt County line. It is 13 miles (21 km) north of Humboldt via US 169. Iowa Highway 408 leads east from St. Joseph 7 miles (11 km) to Lu Verne.

According to the U.S. Census Bureau, the St. Joseph CDP has an area of 0.85 square miles (2.2 km^{2}), all land. It is bordered to the east by the East Fork of the Des Moines River.

== History ==
One of the earliest histories states "the town was never laid out, as far as the records show, but grew by evolution." The settlement of St. Joseph was formerly known as "Hale". St. Joe began its official existence in 1865 when Oscar Hale, the first landowner of the area, started a post office and hotel. The new community then became known as Hale's post office or Hale.

In 1870, George Hollenbeck came from Wisconsin and started a general store. Casper Waldbillig moved from Dubuque in 1878 and opened a saloon. One of the early settlers was John Devine, who owned a large herd of cattle and was nicknamed the "cattle baron". Many of the early family names are still found in the vicinity today.

In 1871, Gregory Hollenbeck and Margaret Schreiber Hollenbeck donated land on which to build a church in Hale. Father Lenihan was the circuit pastor at that time, and the first church was built in 1872 at a cost of about $1,800.

St. Joseph's population was 72 in 1902, and 100 in 1925.

Since the town of St. Joe is small and unincorporated, the community's life and activities revolve almost entirely around their church and school. In 1996, the parish numbered 141 families. The parish school had 87 students attending grades K through 12.

== Demographics ==
=== 2020 census ===
As of the census of 2020, there were 51 people, 16 households, and 15 families residing in the community. The population density was 59.2 inhabitants per square mile (22.9/km^{2}). There were 23 housing units at an average density of 26.7 per square mile (10.3/km^{2}). The racial makeup of the community was 96.1% White, 0.0% Black or African American, 0.0% Native American, 0.0% Asian, 0.0% Pacific Islander, 0.0% from other races and 3.9% from two or more races. Hispanic or Latino persons of any race comprised 5.9% of the population.

Of the 16 households, 6.2% of which had children under the age of 18 living with them, 87.5% were married couples living together, 0.0% were cohabitating couples, 12.5% had a female householder with no spouse or partner present and 0.0% had a male householder with no spouse or partner present. 6.2% of all households were non-families. 6.2% of all households were made up of individuals, 0.0% had someone living alone who was 65 years old or older.

The median age in the community was 61.2 years. 19.6% of the residents were under the age of 20; 0.0% were between the ages of 20 and 24; 15.7% were from 25 and 44; 37.3% were from 45 and 64; and 27.5% were 65 years of age or older. The gender makeup of the community was 35.3% male and 64.7% female.
