= Humboldt Township, Humboldt County, Iowa =

Humboldt Township
- Township
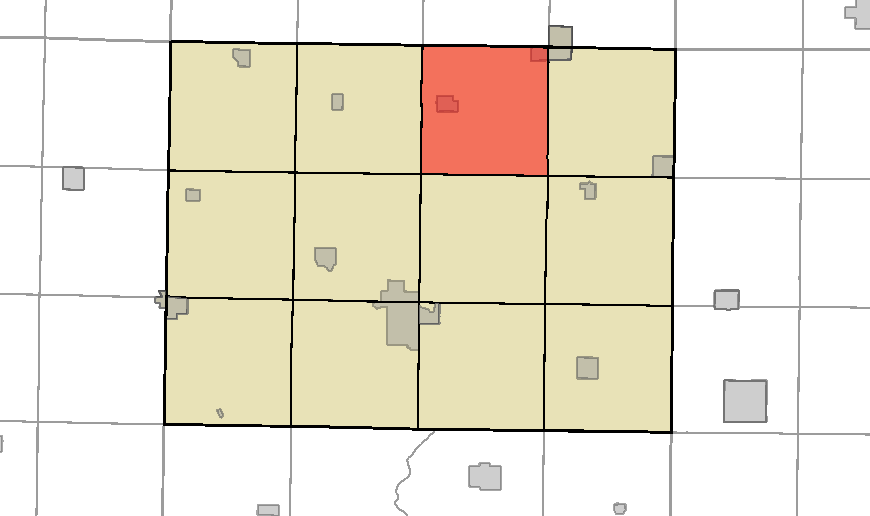
- Location in Humboldt County
- Coordinates: 42°51′40″N 91°09′14″W
- Country: United States
- State: Iowa
- County: Humboldt
- Established: 1857

Area
  - Total: 36.6 sq mi (95 km^{2})
  - Land: 36.6 sq mi (95 km^{2})
  - Water: 0.0 sq mi (0 km^{2})
- Elevation: 915 ft (279 m)

Population (2000)
  - Total: 624
  - Density: 17/sq mi (6.6/km^{2})
- Time zone: UTC-6 (CST)
  - Summer (DST): UTC-5 (CDT)
- ZIP codes: 50558 (Livermore); 50560 (Lu Verne)
- GNIS feature ID: 0468060

Humboldt Township is one of twelve townships in Humboldt County, Iowa, United States. As of the 2000 census, its population was 624. Despite its name, the township does not contain the City of Humboldt.

== Geography ==
According to the United States Census Bureau, Humboldt Township covers an area of 36.6 square miles (95 km^{2}); all of this is land.

=== Cities, towns, villages ===
- Livermore
- Lu Verne

=== Adjacent townships ===
- Sherman Township, Kossuth County (north)
- Lu Verne Township, Kossuth County (northeast)
- Vernon Township (east)
- Lake Township (southeast)
- Grove Township (south)
- Rutland Township (southwest)
- Delana Township (west)
- Riverdale Township, Kossuth County (northwest)

=== Cemetery ===
The township contains Mount Calvary Cemetery.

== Political districts ==
- Iowa's 4th congressional district
- State House District 4
