= Grove Township, Humboldt County, Iowa =

Grove Township
- Township
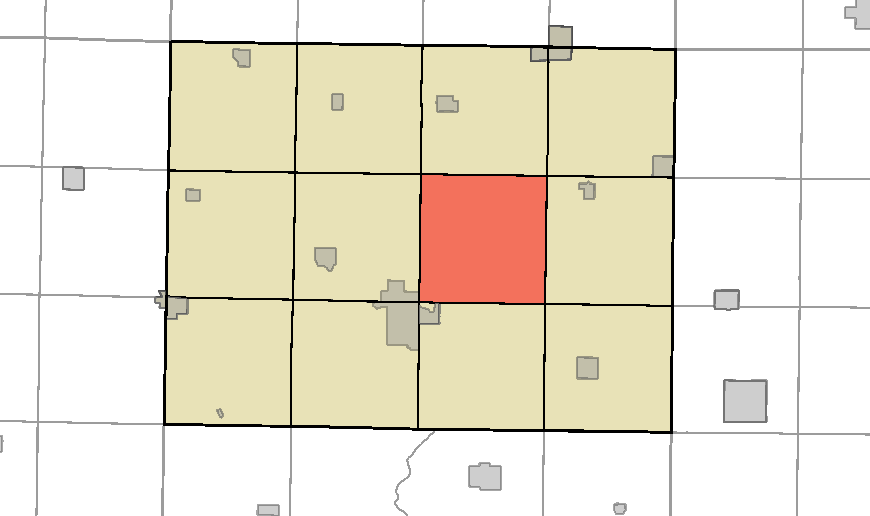
- Location of Grove Township in Humboldt County
- Coordinates: 42°51′50″N 94°16′17″W
- Country: United States
- State: Iowa
- County: Humboldt
- Established: 1873

Area
  - Total: 36.3 sq mi (94 km^{2})
  - Land: 36.2 sq mi (94 km^{2})
  - Water: 0.1 sq mi (0.26 km^{2})
- Elevation: 1,135 ft (346 m)

Population (2000)
  - Total: 316
  - Density: 9/sq mi (3.5/km^{2})
- Time zone: UTC-6 (CST)
  - Summer (DST): UTC-5 (CDT)
- ZIP codes: 50519 (Bode)
- GNIS feature ID: 467983

Grove Township is one of twelve townships in Humboldt County, Iowa, United States. As of the 2000 census, its population was 316.

== History ==
Grove Township was organized in 1873.

== Geography ==
According to the United States Census Bureau, Grove Township covers an area of 36.3 square miles (94 km^{2}); 36.2 square miles (94 km^{2}) of this is land, and the remaining 0.1 square miles (0.26 km^{2}) is water.

=== Cities, towns, villages ===
- Arnold (unincorporated)

A community named Randolph contained a post office from 1874 to 1875. A post office also existed for the community Arnold, formerly Grove, from 1900 to 1929. Both of these historic communities were located in the northwest corner of Grove Township.

=== Adjacent townships ===
- Humboldt Township (north)
- Vernon Township (northeast)
- Lake Township (east)
- Norway Township (southeast)
- Beaver Township (south)
- Corinth Township (southwest)
- Rutland Township (west)
- Delana Township (northwest)

=== Cemeteries ===
The township contains Hands Grove Township Cemetery.

== Political districts ==
- Iowa's 4th congressional district
- State House District 4
