= List of county routes in Humboldt County, Iowa =

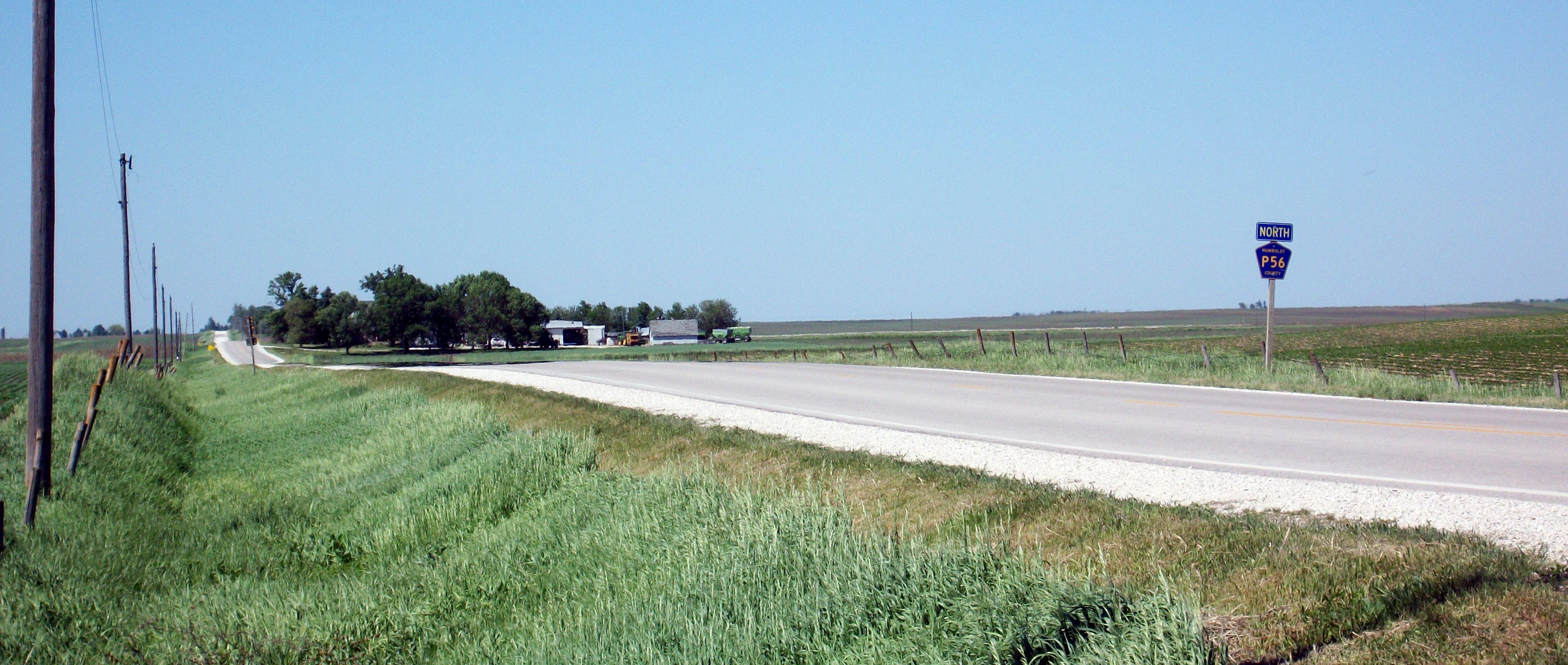
"County K" north of Humboldt, Iowa.

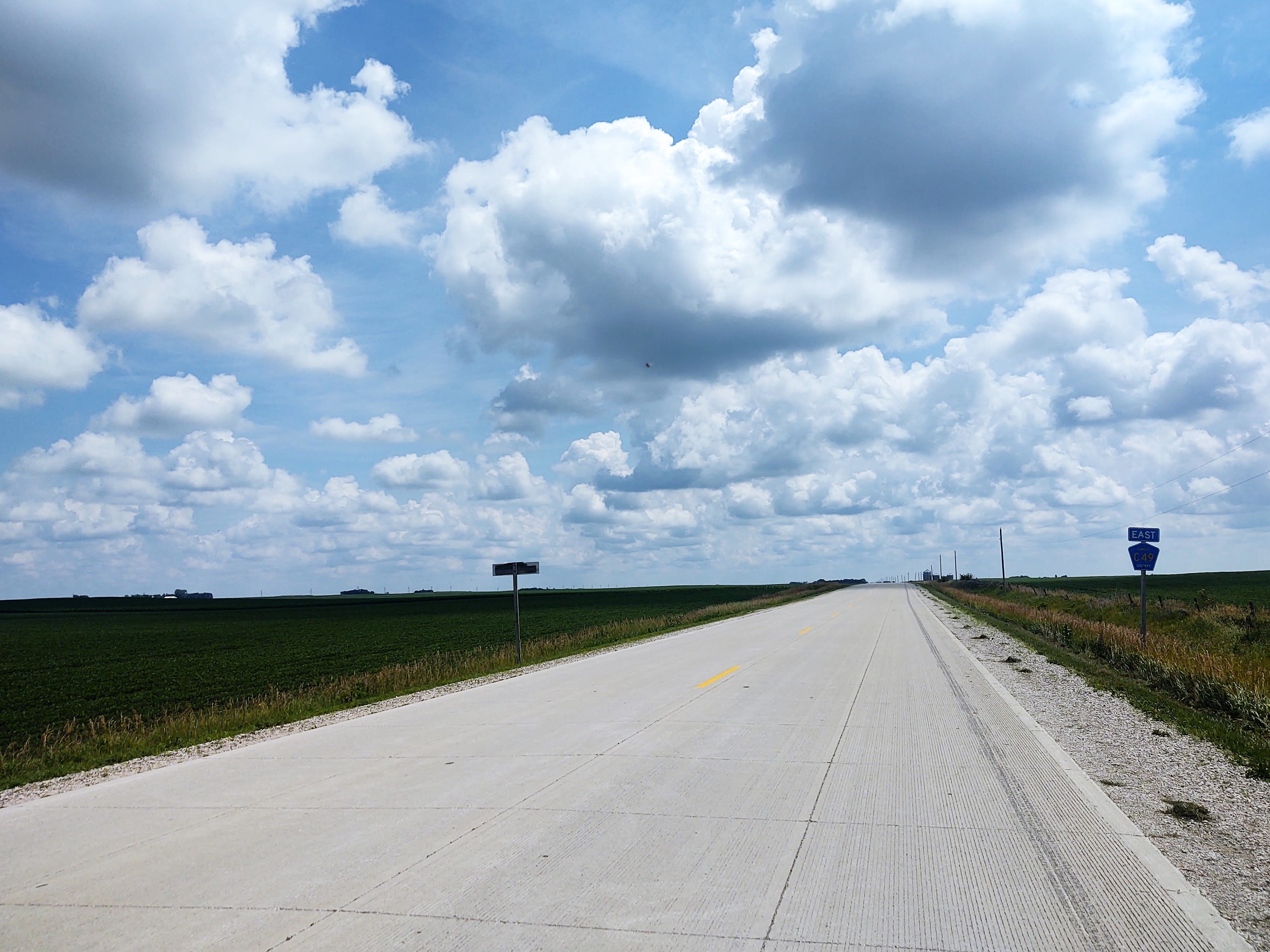
CR C49 near Pioneer, Iowa

The following is a list of county routes in Humboldt County, Iowa. All county roads are maintained by the county in which they reside, and all are marked with standard MUTCD approved county road shields. Humboldt County's routes all follow Iowa's alphanumeric system.

== List of current County Routes in Humboldt County, Iowa ==
This list is up to date as of December 2017.

#	Surface	Direction and Termini				Mileage (km)	Notes
CR C12	Paved	E/W	US 169	to	IA 17	13.0 miles (20.9 km)	Former Iowa 408
CR C18	Paved/Gravel	E/W	Pocahontas CR C18	to	Bode	9.0 miles (14.5 km)	
CR C20	Paved	E/W	IA 15	to	IA 17	26.9 miles (43.3 km)	Portions former Iowa 222
CR C23	Gravel	E/W	P33	to	P56	5.5 miles (8.9 km)	
CR C26	Paved	E/W	Pocahontas CR C26	to	Wright CR C26	26.5 miles (42.6 km)	
CR C28	Gravel	E/W	P66	to	Smith St., Renwick	3.5 miles (5.6 km)	
CR C29	Paved/Gravel	E/W	P19	to	US 169	12.1 miles (19.5 km)	East portion formerly Iowa 367
CR C30	Paved	E/W	P66	to	IA 17	4.0 miles (6.4 km)	
CR C44	Paved/Gravel	E/W	P19	to	US 169	11.0 miles (17.7 km)	Locally Wildcat Road
CR C44	Gravel	E/W	P56	to	P66	6.7 miles (10.8 km)	
CR C46	Paved/Gravel	E/W	P19	to	US 169	11.0 miles (17.7 km)	
CR C48	Paved	E/W	P56	to	Thor	6.6 miles (10.6 km)	
CR C49	Paved	E/W	Pocahontas CR C49	to	US 169	11.0 miles (17.7 km)	
CR C54	Paved	E/W	P66	to	Wright County Line	4.0 miles (6.4 km)	
CR P19	Paved	N/S	C49	to	IA 15	17.2 miles (27.7 km)	
CR P20	Paved	N/S	C26	to	Kossuth CR P20	7.5 miles (12.1 km)	
CR P23	Paved/Gravel	N/S	C49	to	C26, Bradgate	14.9 miles (24.0 km)	
CR P29	Paved	N/S	Webster CR P29	to	IA 3	6.0 miles (9.7 km)	
CR P30	Paved	N/S	C20	to	Kossuth CR P30	1.2 miles (1.9 km)	
CR P33	Paved/Gravel	N/S	Webster County line	to	C20, Bode	15.5 miles (24.9 km)	
CR P56	Paved/Gravel	N/S	Webster County line	to	C12	20.6 miles (33.2 km)	Colloquially "County K"
CR P57	Gravel	N/S	IA 3	to	C20	11.9 miles (19.2 km)	
CR P59	Paved	N/S	Webster CR 59	to	C48	3.0 miles (4.8 km)	
CR P60	Paved	N/S	C20	to	C12, Lu Verne	2.4 miles (3.9 km)	
CR P63	Paved/Gravel	N/S	Webster CR	to	C26	11.0 miles (17.7 km)	
CR P66	Paved	N/S	C48, Thor	to	C12	15.3 miles (24.6 km)	
CR P76	Gravel	N/S	IA 17, Renwick	to	C12	6.4 miles (10.3 km)	
