= Weaver Township, Humboldt County, Iowa =

Weaver Township
- Township
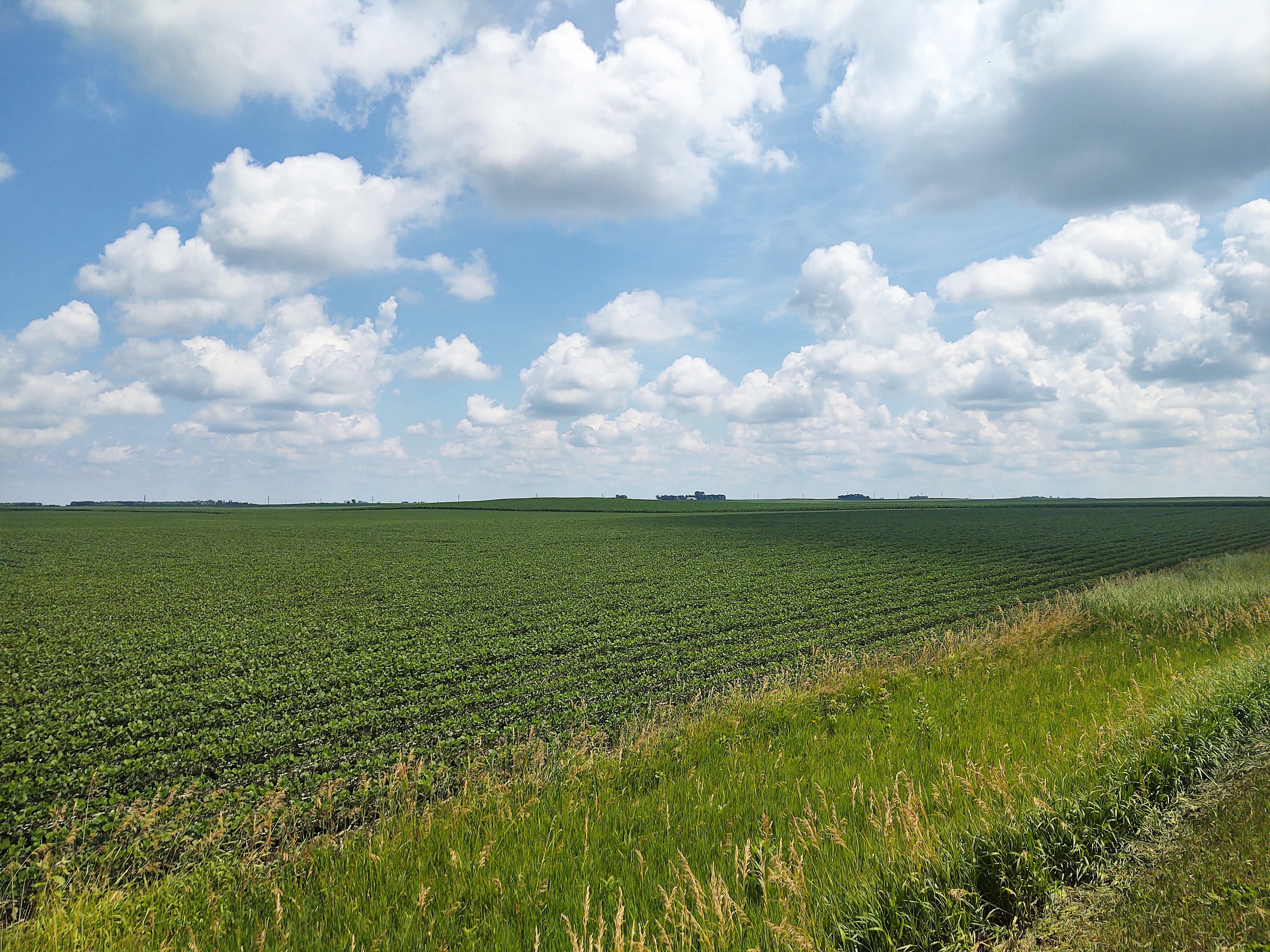
- Farmland in Weaver Township near Pioneer

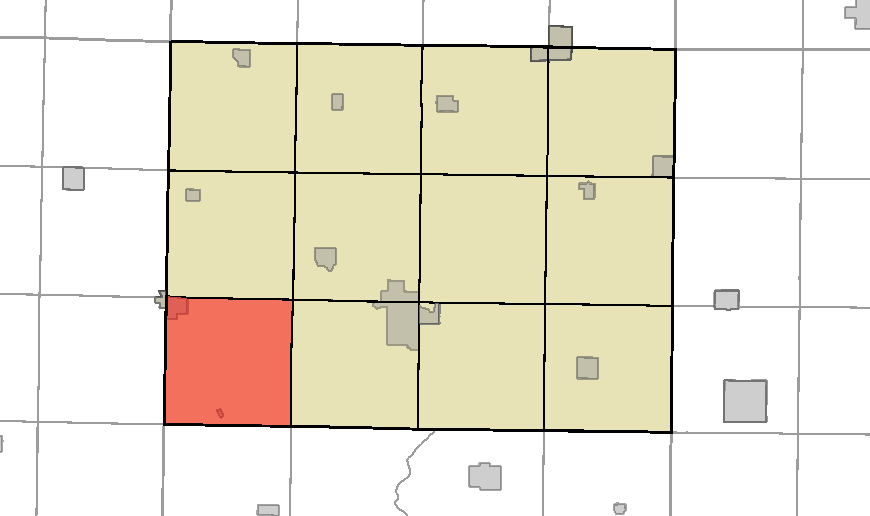
- Location in Humboldt County
- Coordinates: 42°41′24″N 94°22′35″W
- Country: United States
- State: Iowa
- County: Humboldt
- Established: 1873

Area
  - Total: 36.1 sq mi (93 km^{2})
  - Land: 36.1 sq mi (93 km^{2})
  - Water: 0.0 sq mi (0 km^{2})
- Elevation: 1,171 ft (357 m)

Population (2000)
  - Total: 508
  - Density: 14/sq mi (5.4/km^{2})
- Time zone: UTC-6 (CST)
  - Summer (DST): UTC-5 (CDT)
- ZIP codes: 50541 (Gilmore City, Pioneer)
- GNIS feature ID: 0468960

Weaver Township is one of twelve townships in Humboldt County, Iowa, United States. As of the 2000 census, its population was 508.

== History ==
Weaver Township was organized in 1874. It was named for John N. Weaver, who gave a well-received speech on the Fourth of July, 1873.

== Geography ==
According to the United States Census Bureau, Weaver Township covers an area of 36.1 square miles (93 km^{2}); all of this land.

=== Cities, towns, villages ===
- Gilmore City, also partially in Pocahontas County
- Pioneer, unincorporated community
- Unique, former community that existed from 1879 to 1900, now unincorporated

=== Adjacent townships ===
- Avery Township (north)
- Rutland Township (northeast)
- Corinth Township (east)
- Deer Creek Township, Webster County (southeast)
- Jackson Township, Webster County (south)
- Lincoln Township, Calhoun County (southwest)
- Lake Township, Pocahontas County (west)
- Garfield Township, Pocahontas County (northwest)

=== Cemeteries ===
The township contains Weaver Township Cemetery and Marble Valley Cemetery.

== Political districts ==
- Iowa's 4th congressional district
- State House District 4
