= Avery Township, Humboldt County, Iowa =

Avery Township
- Township
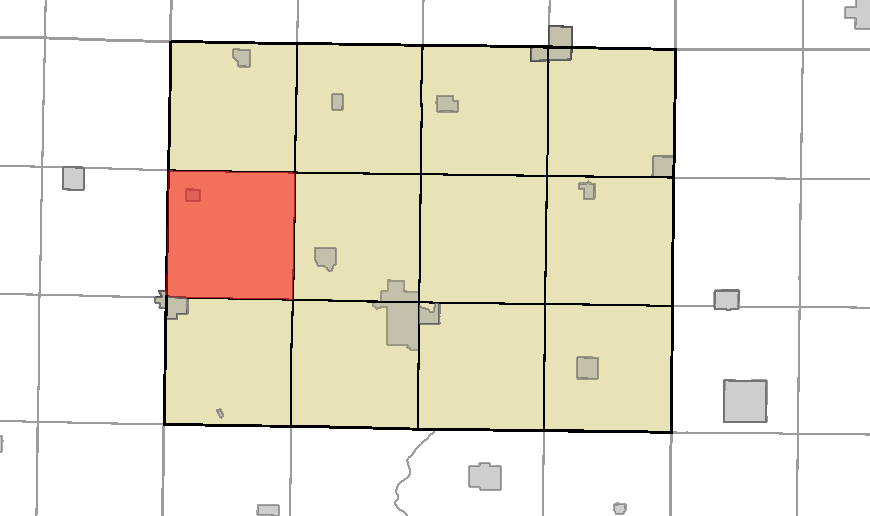
- Location in Humboldt County

- Humboldt County's location in Iowa
- Coordinates: 42.947°N 93.562°W
- Country: United States
- State: Iowa
- County: Humboldt
- Named for: Oscar Fitzgalen Avery

Area
  - Total: 36.2 sq mi (94 km^{2})
  - Land: 35.8 sq mi (93 km^{2})
  - Water: 0.4 sq mi (1.0 km^{2})
- Elevation: 1,142 ft (348 m)

Population (2000)
  - Total: 316
- Time zone: UTC-6 (CST)
  - Summer (DST): UTC-5 (CDT)
- ZIP codes: 50520 (Bradgate)
- GNIS feature ID: 0467405

Avery Township is one of twelve townships in Humboldt County, Iowa, United States. As of the 2000 census, its population was 316.

== History ==
Avery Township was organized in 1873. It is named for O. F. Avery, a pioneer settler.

== Geography ==
According to the United States Census Bureau, Avery Township covers an area of 36.2 square miles (94 km^{2}); of this, 35.8 square miles (93 km^{2}) is land and 0.4 square miles (1.0 km^{2}) is water.

=== Cities, towns, villages ===
- Bradgate

=== Adjacent townships ===
- Wacousta Township (north)
- Delana Township (northeast)
- Rutland Township (east)
- Corinth Township (southeast)
- Weaver Township (south)
- Lake Township, Pocahontas County (southwest)
- Garfield Township, Pocahontas County (west)
- Des Moines Township, Pocahontas County (northwest)

=== Cemeteries ===
The township does not contain any cemeteries.

== Political districts ==
- Iowa's 4th congressional district
- State House District 4
