= Arnold, Iowa =

- Unincorporated community
- Location within Iowa
- Coordinates: 42°48′39″N 94°11′55″W
- Country: United States
- State: Iowa
- County: Humboldt
- Elevation: 1,132 ft (345 m)
- Time zone: UTC-6 (Central (CST))
  - Summer (DST): UTC-5 (CDT)
- Area code: 515
- GNIS feature ID: 464448

Arnold is an unincorporated community in Grove Township, Humboldt County, Iowa, United States.

== Geography ==
Arnold is located along Michigan Avenue, 6.3 miles (10.1 km) north of Humboldt.

== History ==
Arnold was originally named Grove, and was located on the Minneapolis and St. Paul Railroad. It was renamed in 1900 in honor of Hiram Arnold, an early settler.

Arnold's population was 26 in 1902.

On July 3, 1920, a major train accident occurred 0.5 miles (0.80 km) north of Arnold on a bridge over Bloody Run Creek. Eight passengers perished and many others were injured when the bridge collapsed.

The population of Arnold was 20 in 1940.

== See also ==
- Pioneer, Iowa
