= Unique, Iowa =

- Ghost town
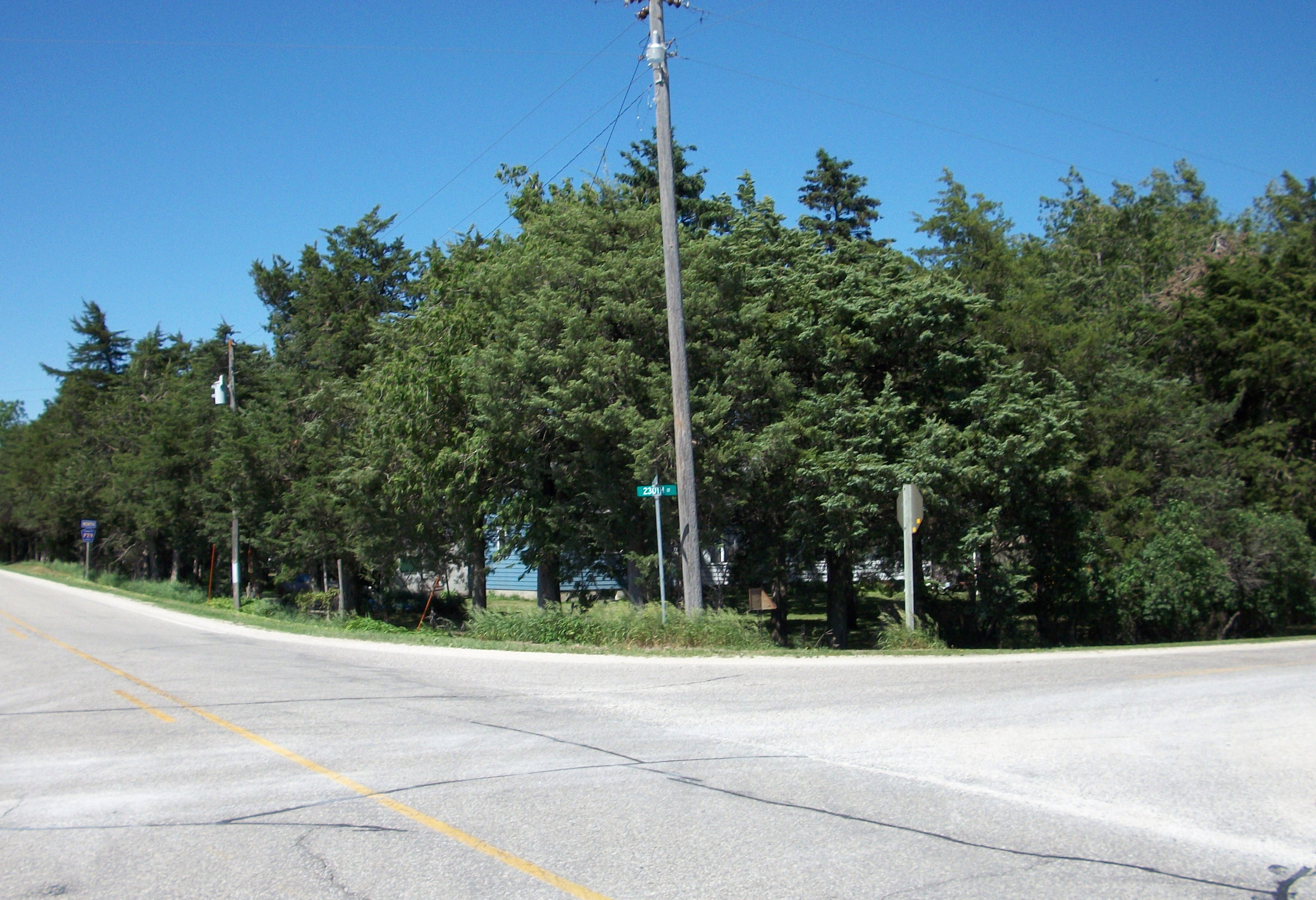
- Unique as seen in 2010. The small metal sign formerly said "Unique, Iowa".

- Unique's position in Iowa.
- Coordinates: 42°43′02″N 94°20′43″W
- Country: United States
- State: Iowa
- County: Humboldt
- Post Office opened: April 16, 1878
- Elevation: 1,152 ft (351 m)
- Time zone: UTC-6 (Central (CST))
  - Summer (DST): UTC-5 (CDT)
- GNIS feature ID: 465624

Unique was a hamlet in Weaver Township, Humboldt County, Iowa, United States.

The town contained a post office from April 1878 until September 1891. It was re-established April 1892 and discontinued permanently January 1902.

== History ==
Settlers began building in the area when it was believed that a railroad would pass through the marshland. The Barker School was built at Unique in either 1873 or 1879. A post office was established in 1878. The state of Iowa moved the post office in 1880, to its present-day location in the northeast corner. An argument over where the Methodist Church should be established with the Reed's Corner settlement (two miles to the south) had to be settled by church authorities. The church was built in 1889 just north of the Unique schoolhouse. The first school building was replaced in 1937, and the second school closed in 1944.

== Today ==
A rusted metal sign is all that remains of Unique. It formerly said "Unique, Iowa", but is now illegible. The intersection of Humboldt County Route C44 (230th Street) and Humboldt County Route P29 (Florida Avenue) is often referred to colloquially as "Unique Corner". The settlement still appears on the Iowa DOT Map and Google Maps.

== Notable person ==
- Roy L. Pinn, Wisconsin politician, was born in Unique.
