= Rutland Township, Humboldt County, Iowa =

Rutland Township
- Township
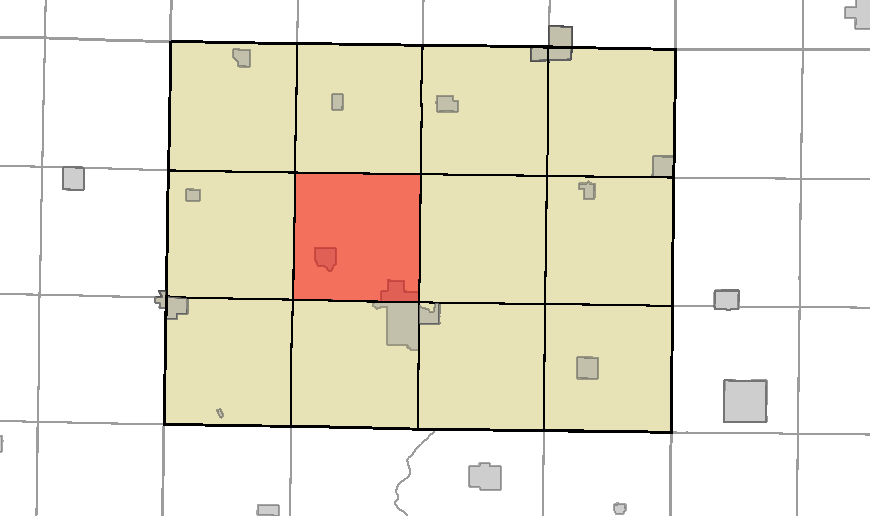
- Location in Humboldt County
- Coordinates: 42°40′17″N 94°00′19″W
- Country: United States
- State: Iowa
- County: Humboldt
- Established: 1867

Area
  - Total: 34.8 sq mi (90 km^{2})
  - Land: 34.5 sq mi (89 km^{2})
  - Water: 0.3 sq mi (0.78 km^{2})
- Elevation: 1,152 ft (351 m)

Population (2000)
  - Total: 529
  - Density: 15/sq mi (5.8/km^{2})
- Time zone: UTC-6 (CST)
  - Summer (DST): UTC-5 (CDT)
- ZIP codes: 50582 (Rutland)
- GNIS feature ID: 0468648

Rutland Township is one of twelve townships in Humboldt County, Iowa, United States. As of the 2000 census, its population was 529.

== History ==
Rutland Township was organized in 1867.

== Geography ==
According to the United States Census Bureau, Rutland Township covers an area of 34.8 square miles (90 km^{2}); 34.5 square miles (89 km^{2}) of this is land, and the remaining 0.3 square miles (0.78 km^{2}) is water.

=== Cities, towns, villages ===
- Rutland

=== Adjacent townships ===
- Delana Township (north)
- Humboldt Township (northeast)
- Grove Township (east)
- Beaver Township (southeast)
- Corinth Township (south)
- Weaver Township (southwest)
- Avery Township (west)
- Wacousta Township (northwest)

=== Cemeteries ===
The township contains Rutland Township Cemetery.

== Political districts ==
- Iowa's 4th congressional district
- State House District 4
