= Lake Township, Humboldt County, Iowa =

Lake Township
- Township
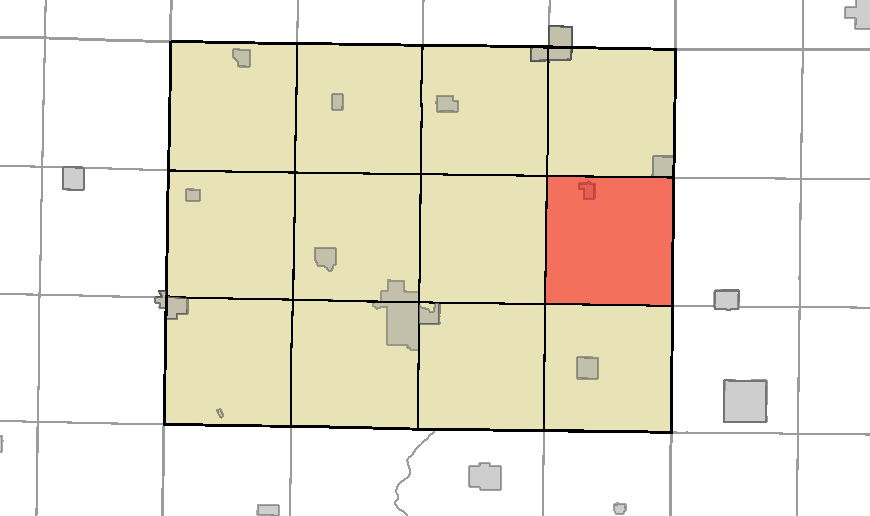
- Location in Humboldt County
- Coordinates: 42°46′56″N 94°02′25″W
- Country: United States
- State: Iowa
- County: Humboldt
- Established: 1870

Area
  - Total: 36.5 sq mi (95 km^{2})
  - Land: 36.5 sq mi (95 km^{2})
  - Water: 0.0 sq mi (0 km^{2})
- Elevation: 1,148 ft (350 m)

Population (2000)
  - Total: 290
  - Density: 8/sq mi (3.1/km^{2})
- Time zone: UTC-6 (CST)
  - Summer (DST): UTC-5 (CDT)
- ZIP codes: 50545 (Hardy)
- GNIS feature ID: 0468180

Lake Township is one of twelve townships in Humboldt County, Iowa, United States. As of the 2000 census, its population was 290.

== History ==
Lake Township was organized in 1870.

== Geography ==
According to the United States Census Bureau, Lake Township covers an area of 36.5 square miles (95 km^{2}); all of this is land.

=== Cities, towns, villages ===
- Hardy

=== Adjacent townships ===
- Vernon Township (north)
- Boone Township, Wright County (northeast)
- Liberty Township, Wright County (east)
- Eagle Grove Township, Wright County (southeast)
- Norway Township (south)
- Beaver Township (southwest)
- Grove Township (west)
- Humboldt Township (northwest)

=== Cemeteries ===
The township contains Hardy Trinity Lutheran Cemetery and Lake Church Cemetery.

== Political districts ==
- Iowa's 4th congressional district
- State House District 4
