= Twin Rivers Community School District =

School district in Iowa

Coordinates: 42.867314°N 94.289760°W

Location
- Bode, Iowa Humboldt and Kossuth counties United States
- Coordinates: 42.867314, -94.289760

District information
- Type: Local school district
- Grades: K–5
- Superintendent: Greg Darling
- Schools: Twin Rivers Elementary School
- Budget: $2,771,000 (2020-21)
- NCES District ID: 1928200

Students and staff
- Students: 49 (2022-23)
- Teachers: 7.96 FTE
- Staff: 8.71 FTE
- Student–teacher ratio: 6.16

Other information
- Website: www.tr.k12.ia.us

Twin Rivers Community School District is a rural public school district headquartered in Bode, Iowa.

The district is mostly in Humboldt County with a section in Kossuth County. The district serves Bode, Livermore, and Ottosen.

== History ==
The district previously had a grade sharing agreement with the Gilmore City–Bradgate Community School District.

In July 2011, the district began a whole grade sharing agreement with the Humboldt Community School District. In 2015, 37 students living in the Twin Rivers district in grades 6–12 attended the middle-high school operated by Humboldt.
