= Gilmore City–Bradgate Community School District =

School district in Iowa

Coordinates: 42.726794°N 94.439366°W

Address
- 402 SE East Ave Humboldt, Pocahontas, and Webster counties Gilmore City, Iowa, 50541; United States
- Coordinates: 42.726794, -94.439366

District information
- Motto: A Great Start, Close to Home
- Grades: Pre-school–6
- Superintendent: Amanda Schmidt
- Schools: 1
- Budget: $3,283,000 (2020-21)
- NCES District ID: 1931680

Students and staff
- Students: 119 (2022-23)
- Teachers: 10.89 FTE
- Staff: 16.54 FTE
- Student–teacher ratio: 10.93
- District mascot: Wolverines
- Colors: Purple, gold, and black

Other information
- Telephone: (515) 373-6124
- Website: Gilmore City–Bradgate School District

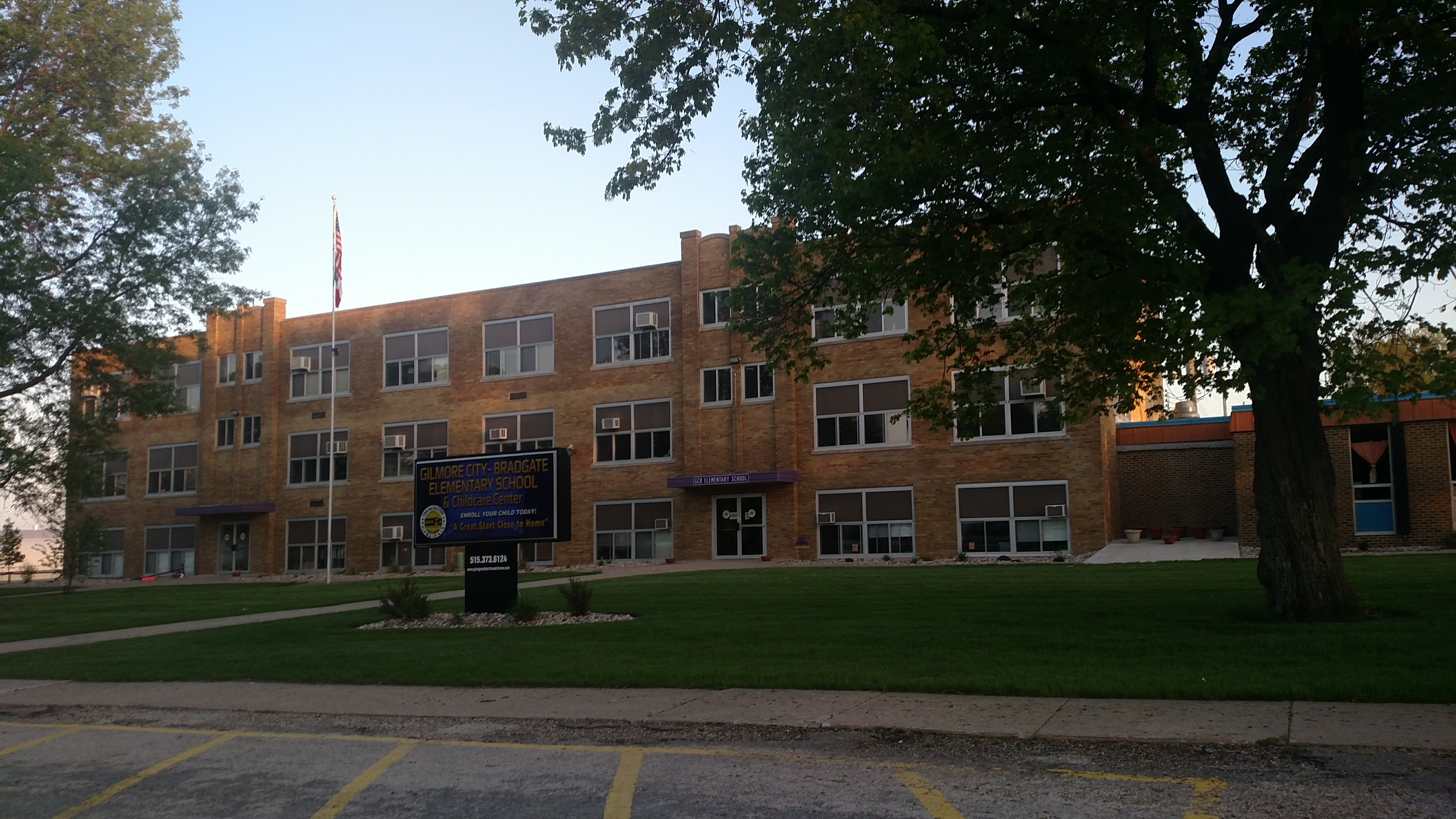
Gilmore City–Bradgate Elementary School

The Gilmore City–Bradgate Community School District is a rural public school district headquartered in Gilmore City, Iowa.

The district is located in sections of Humboldt, Pocahontas, and Webster counties. It serves Gilmore City, Bradgate, and Pioneer.

== History ==
The district previously had a grade-sharing agreement with the Twin Rivers Community School District.

The district initially began a grade-sharing agreement with the West Bend–Mallard Community School District in which GC-B sent its high school students to WB-M. By 2012 the two districts were in talks to also have GC-B sent middle school grades 7–8 to WB-M, as GC-B only had 11 students in those grades.

== Schools ==
The Gilmore City–Bradgate School District has a daycare and an elementary school. 7–12 students attend West Bend–Mallard under a whole-grade sharing agreement.

=== Elementary school ===
- Gilmore City Elementary School
