= Livermore, Iowa =

- City
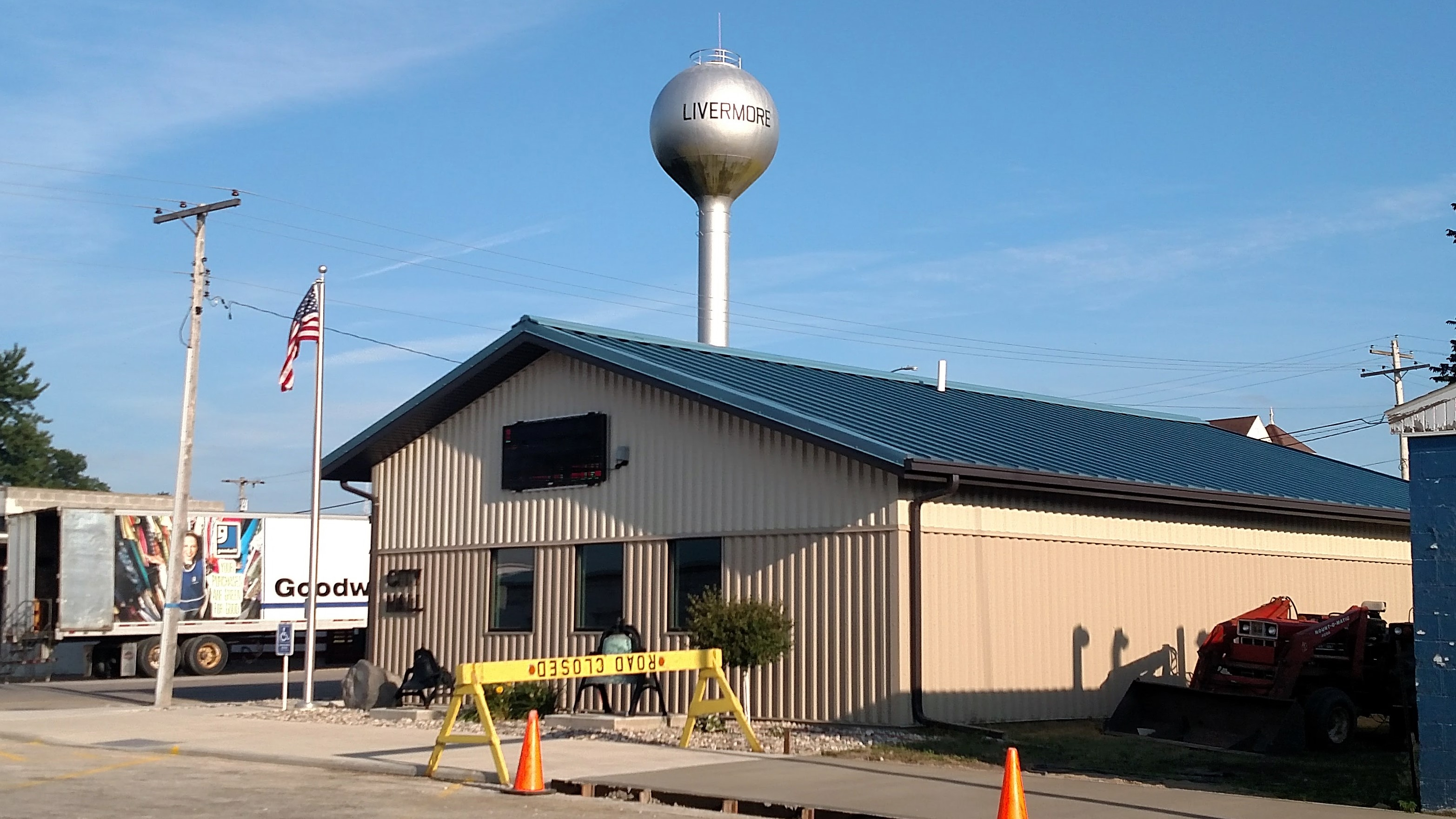
- City Hall in Livermore

- Location of Livermore, Iowa
- Coordinates: 42°52′05″N 94°11′03″W
- Country: US
- State: Iowa
- County: Humboldt
- Incorporated: March 11, 1882

Area
  - Total: 0.69 sq mi (1.78 km^{2})
  - Land: 0.69 sq mi (1.78 km^{2})
  - Water: 0 sq mi (0.00 km^{2})
- Elevation: 1,145 ft (349 m)

Population (2020)
  - Total: 381
  - Density: 555.8/sq mi (214.61/km^{2})
- Time zone: UTC-6 (Central (CST))
  - Summer (DST): UTC-5 (CDT)
- ZIP code: 50558
- Area code: 515
- FIPS code: 19-45975
- GNIS feature ID: 2395739
- Website: www.livermoreiowa.org

Livermore is a city in Humboldt County, Iowa, United States. The population was 381 at the time of the 2020 census. Livermore is the hometown of former University of Iowa and NFL tight end Dallas Clark.

== History ==
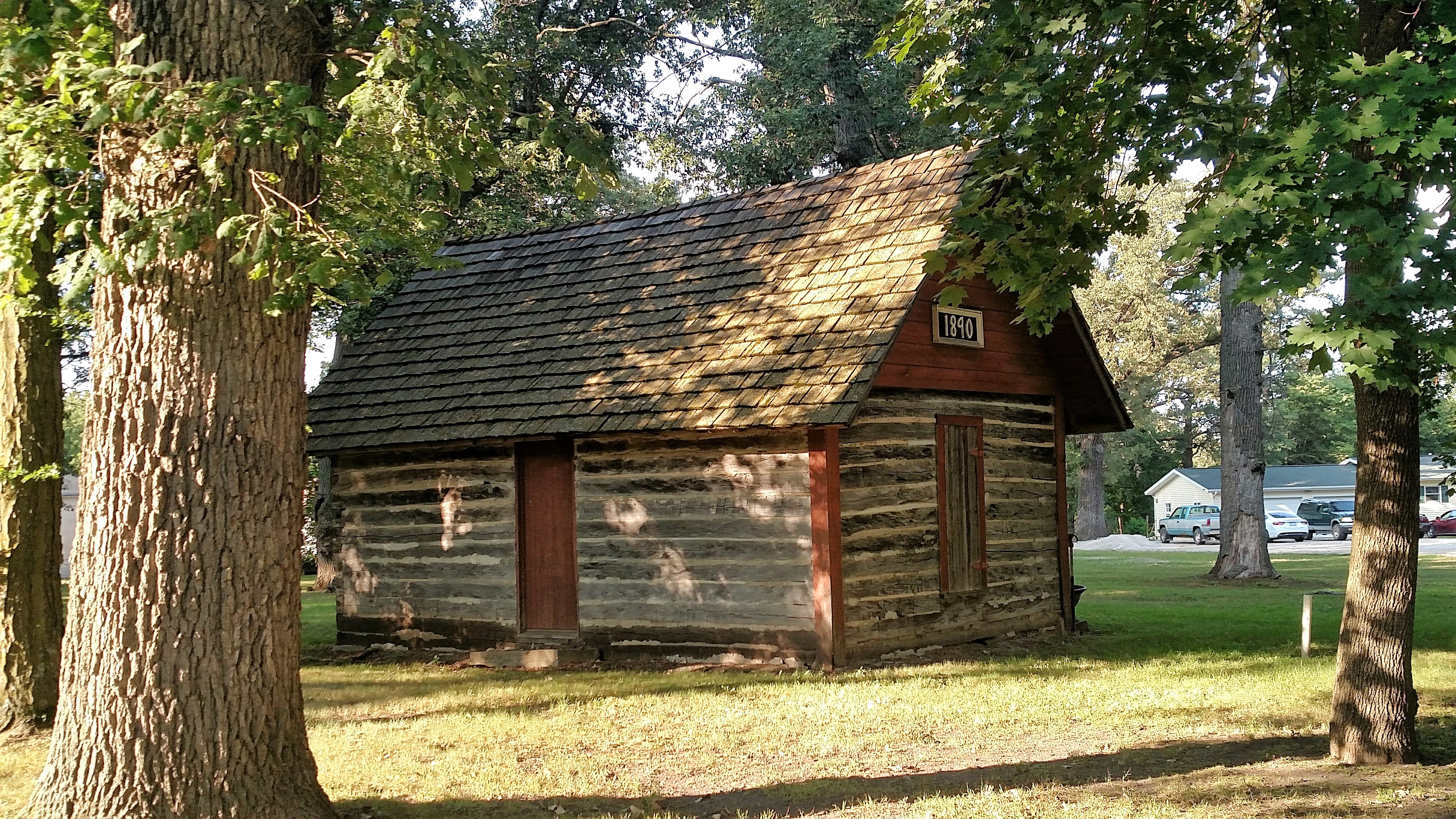
1890 log cabin in Old Settlers Park

Livermore was founded in 1879. The community grew in importance as an agricultural center with grain elevators and feed mills and merchants serving the surrounding rich farmland. The community is located adjacent to the confluence of the East Fork Des Moines River and Lott's Creek. Early industries included a brick and tile factory and agricultural products processing. As north central Iowa's rural population dwindled, so has Livermore's population. Its remaining elementary school closed in 2005.

== Geography ==
Livermore is located at the confluence of Lotts Creek with the East Fork Des Moines River.

According to the United States Census Bureau, the city has a total area of 0.70 square miles (1.81 km^{2}), all land.

=== Climate ===
Livermore has a humid continental climate (Köppen Dfa), including all four seasons characterized by harsh winters, and mild summers.

July is the hottest month of the year, with an average high of 84 °F (29 °C) and an average low of 62 °F (17 °C). Temperatures above 100 °F (38 °C) are uncommon. January is the coldest month with an average high of 25 °F (−4 °C) and an average low of 7 °F (−14 °C). The city's highest temperature was 104 °F (40.0 °C), recorded in 1982. The lowest temperature recorded was −33 °F (−36 °C), in 1985.

Climate data for Livermore, Iowa
Month	Jan	Feb	Mar	Apr	May	Jun	Jul	Aug	Sep	Oct	Nov	Dec	Year
Record high °F (°C)	63 (17)	67 (19)	87 (31)	95 (35)	98 (37)	104 (40)	102 (39)	100 (38)	98 (37)	95 (35)	19 (−7)	65 (18)	104 (40)
Mean daily maximum °F (°C)	25 (−4)	31 (−1)	44 (7)	59 (15)	72 (22)	81 (27)	84 (29)	81 (27)	74 (23)	62 (17)	43 (6)	29 (−2)	57 (14)
Mean daily minimum °F (°C)	7 (−14)	14 (−10)	25 (−4)	37 (3)	49 (9)	58 (14)	62 (17)	60 (16)	50 (10)	38 (3)	25 (−4)	12 (−11)	36 (2)
Record low °F (°C)	−33 (−36)	−31 (−35)	−22 (−30)	6 (−14)	25 (−4)	34 (1)	41 (5)	37 (3)	25 (−4)	14 (−10)	−14 (−26)	−26 (−32)	−33 (−36)
Average precipitation inches (mm)	0.88 (22)	0.80 (20)	2.16 (55)	3.28 (83)	3.89 (99)	4.79 (122)	4.29 (109)	4.12 (105)	2.95 (75)	2.28 (58)	1.74 (44)	1.07 (27)	32.25 (819)
Average snowfall inches (cm)	5.3 (13)	6.0 (15)	5.4 (14)	0.5 (1.3)	0 (0)	0 (0)	0 (0)	0 (0)	0 (0)	0.1 (0.25)	2.1 (5.3)	6.8 (17)	26.2 (65.85)
Average precipitation days (≥ 0.01 in Days)	2.5	3.0	4.1	5.6	6.8	7.3	5.7	6.6	5.6	3.5	2.8	2.8	56.3
Source: Weatherbase

== Demographics ==
Historical populations
Year	Pop.	±%
1880	168	—
1890	459	+173.2%
1900	618	+34.6%
1910	578	−6.5%
1920	648	+12.1%
1930	666	+2.8%
1940	736	+10.5%
1950	615	−16.4%
1960	545	−11.4%
1970	510	−6.4%
1980	490	−3.9%
1990	436	−11.0%
2000	431	−1.1%
2010	384	−10.9%
2020	381	−0.8%
Source:"United Stztes Census Bureau". United States Census Bureau. and Iowa Data Center; Source: US Decennial Census

=== 2020 census ===
As of the census of 2020, there were 381 people, 157 households, and 95 families residing in the city. The population density was 555.8 inhabitants per square mile (214.6/km^{2}). There were 184 housing units at an average density of 268.4 per square mile (103.6/km^{2}). The racial makeup of the city was 90.3% White, 0.5% Black or African American, 0.0% Native American, 0.3% Asian, 1.6% Pacific Islander, 1.0% from other races and 6.3% from two or more races. Hispanic or Latino persons of any race comprised 3.1% of the population.

Of the 157 households, 26.1% of which had children under the age of 18 living with them, 45.9% were married couples living together, 14.0% were cohabitating couples, 19.7% had a female householder with no spouse or partner present and 20.4% had a male householder with no spouse or partner present. 39.5% of all households were non-families. 29.3% of all households were made up of individuals, 14.0% had someone living alone who was 65 years old or older.

The median age in the city was 36.4 years. 25.7% of the residents were under the age of 20; 5.8% were between the ages of 20 and 24; 24.1% were from 25 and 44; 27.8% were from 45 and 64; and 16.5% were 65 years of age or older. The gender makeup of the city was 49.6% male and 50.4% female.

=== 2010 census ===
As of the census of 2010, there were 384 people, 164 households, and 106 families residing in the city. The population density was 548.6 inhabitants per square mile (211.8/km^{2}). There were 197 housing units at an average density of 281.4 per square mile (108.6/km^{2}). The racial makeup of the city was 96.9% White, 0.5% African American, 0.3% Native American, 1.0% from other races, and 1.3% from two or more races. Hispanic or Latino of any race were 2.3% of the population.

There were 164 households, of which 28.0% had children under the age of 18 living with them, 49.4% were married couples living together, 8.5% had a female householder with no husband present, 6.7% had a male householder with no wife present, and 35.4% were non-families. 29.3% of all households were made up of individuals, and 14.6% had someone living alone who was 65 years of age or older. The average household size was 2.34 and the average family size was 2.83.

The median age in the city was 41 years. 24.5% of residents were under the age of 18; 3.8% were between the ages of 18 and 24; 27.1% were from 25 to 44; 28.7% were from 45 to 64; and 15.9% were 65 years of age or older. The gender makeup of the city was 49.7% male and 50.3% female.

=== 2000 census ===
As of the census of 2000, there were 431 people, 183 households, and 109 families residing in the city. The population density was 616.4 inhabitants per square mile (238.0/km^{2}). There were 204 housing units at an average density of 291.7 per square mile (112.6/km^{2}). The racial makeup of the city was 99.77% White and 0.23% Pacific Islander. Hispanic or Latino of any race were 0.46% of the population.

There were 183 households, out of which 29.5% had children under the age of 18 living with them, 45.9% were married couples living together, 7.7% had a female householder with no husband present, and 39.9% were non-families. 35.0% of all households were made up of individuals, and 23.0% had someone living alone who was 65 years of age or older. The average household size was 2.35 and the average family size was 2.94.

In the city, the population was spread out, with 23.9% under the age of 18, 8.4% from 18 to 24, 25.5% from 25 to 44, 24.1% from 45 to 64, and 18.1% who were 65 years of age or older. The median age was 42 years. For every 100 females, there were 89.0 males. For every 100 females age 18 and over, there were 95.2 males.

The median income for a household in the city was $26,328, and the median income for a family was $32,411. Males had a median income of $25,789 versus $19,583 for females. The per capita income for the city was $13,714. About 10.6% of families and 12.6% of the population were below the poverty line, including 7.2% of those under age 18 and 14.5% of those age 65 or over.

== Education ==
It is within the Twin Rivers Community School District.

== Community ==
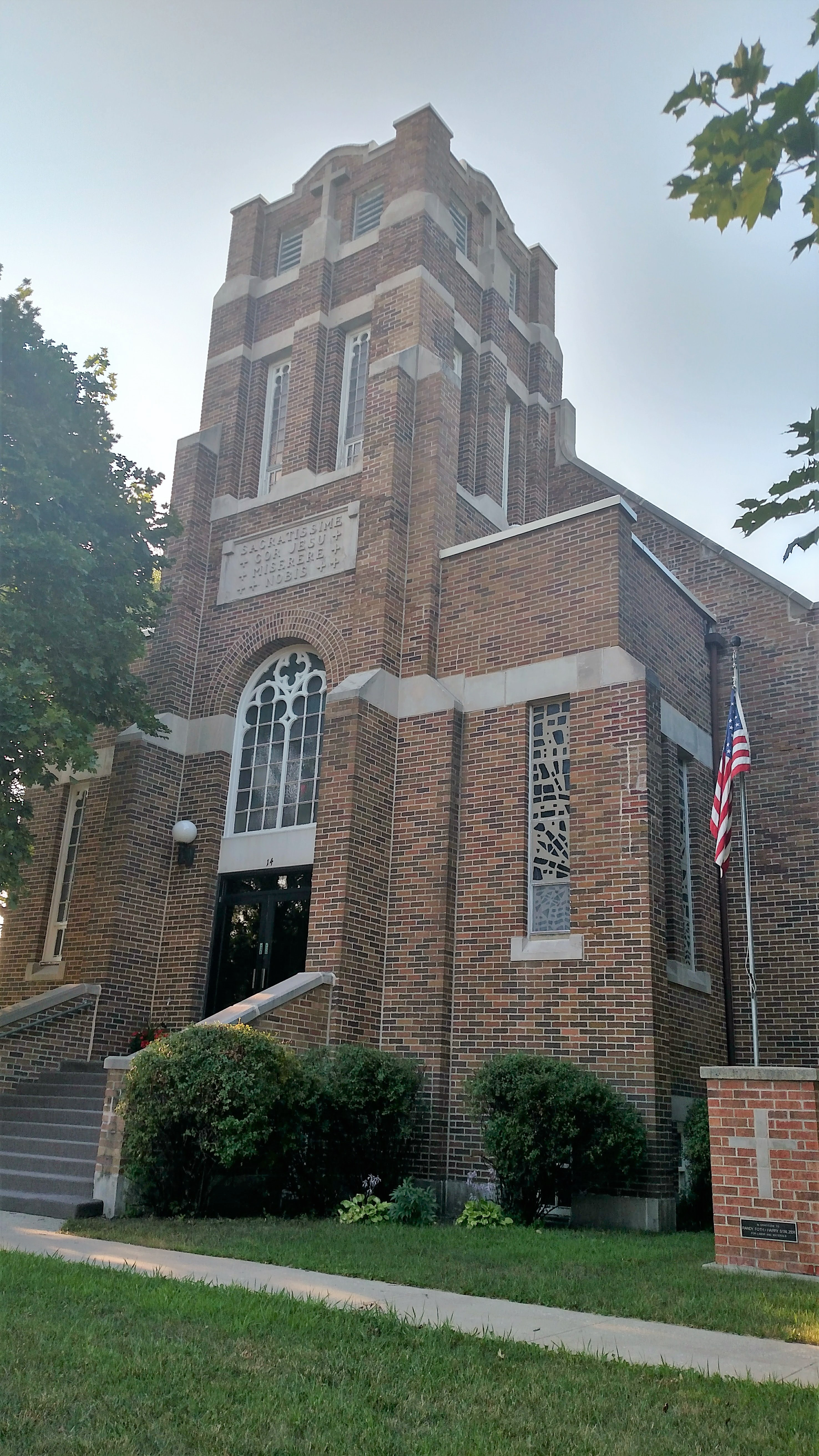
Sacred Heart Catholic Church in Livermore

With a sizeable German Catholic population surrounding Livermore, the community's largest church is Sacred Heart Catholic, followed by Livermore United Methodist and Immanuel Lutheran. Bethel Presbyterian Church closed in the late 1970s and the building is now home to the Livermore Community Club and museum. Other community attractions include Old Settlers' Park, which dates to 1890, when early Livermore families each contributed a log to build a cabin in the thickly wooded park located at the west entrance to the community. The town also features a library, community swimming pool and a high school baseball/softball complex. Just north of Livermore is the picturesque Spring Valley Golf Club, named Iowa's best nine-hole course, before it was expanded to 18 holes. Otto Field American Legion Post 415 is located in Livermore and the town's Friends & Neighbors Club is an active seniors organization with its own building. Livermore Daze is an annual celebration that brings together antique car enthusiasts, parade participants and hundreds of residents and visitors to the weekend event.

== Notable person ==
- Dallas Clark (1979– ) football player for the University of Iowa Hawkeyes and Indianapolis Colts of the NFL, 2003–2011.
