= Ottosen, Iowa =

- City
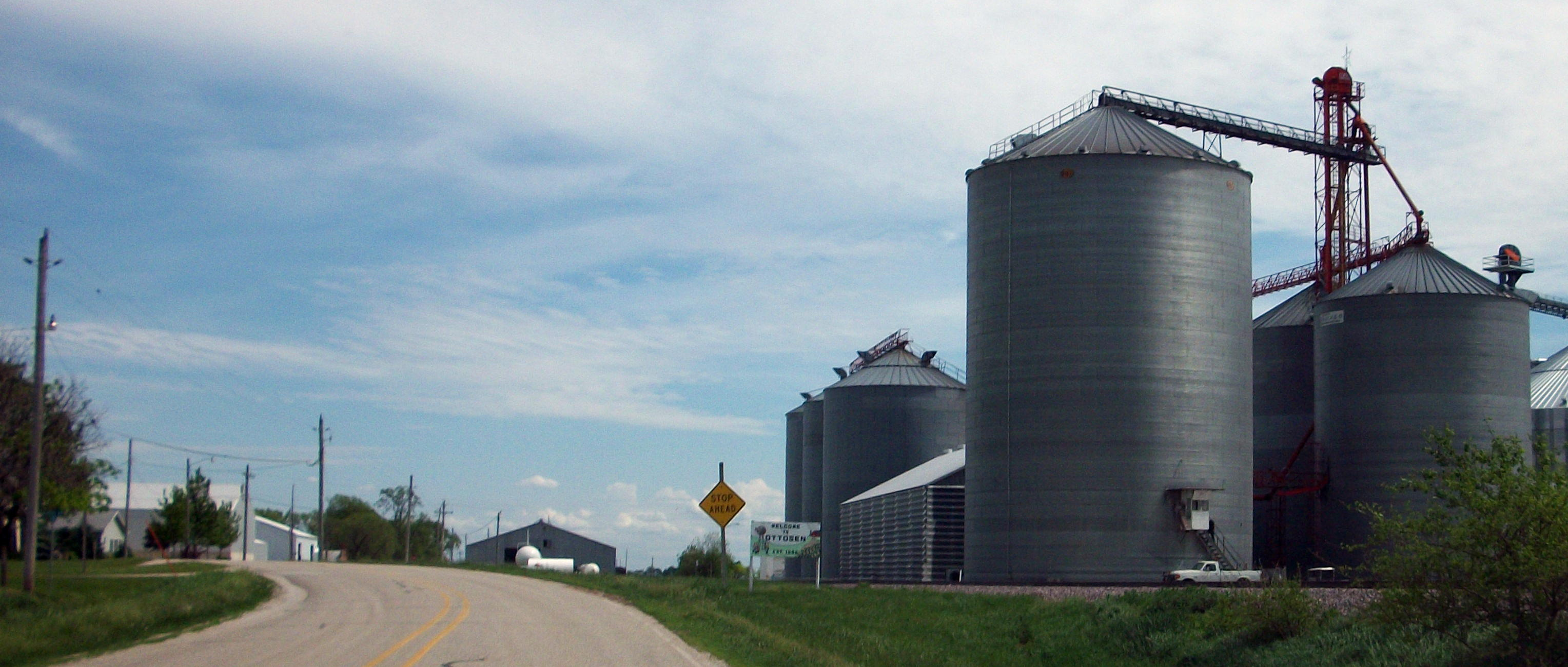
- Ottosen Elevator

- Location of Ottosen, Iowa
- Coordinates: 42°53′51″N 94°22′27″W
- Country: USA
- State: Iowa
- County: Humboldt
- Established: 1906
- Incorporated: July 16, 1909

Area
  - Total: 0.49 sq mi (1.26 km^{2})
  - Land: 0.49 sq mi (1.26 km^{2})
  - Water: 0 sq mi (0.00 km^{2})
- Elevation: 1,152 ft (351 m)

Population (2020)
  - Total: 40
  - Density: 82.3/sq mi (31.77/km^{2})
- Time zone: UTC-6 (Central (CST))
  - Summer (DST): UTC-5 (CDT)
- ZIP code: 50570
- Area code: 515
- FIPS code: 19-60420
- GNIS feature ID: 2396109

Ottosen is a city in Humboldt County, Iowa, United States. The population was 40 in the 2020 census, a decline from 61 in 2000.

== History ==
Ottosen, Iowa was founded in 1896 when Chris Ottosen, a grain dealer in Russel Switch, Iowa petitioned the postmaster general to have a post office. It was rejected because of a similar name in use, so Senator Dolliver resubmitted it under the name of Ottosen. Much of the town burned in a fire in the mid 20th century and was never rebuilt.

== Geography ==
According to the United States Census Bureau, the city has a total area of 0.57 square miles (1.48 km^{2}), all land.

== Demographics ==
Historical population
Census	Pop.	Note	%±
1910	147		—
1920	234		59.2%
1930	191		−18.4%
1940	152		−20.4%
1950	127		−16.4%
1960	92		−27.6%
1970	93		1.1%
1980	92		−1.1%
1990	72		−21.7%
2000	61		−15.3%
2010	55		−9.8%
2020	40		−27.3%
U.S. Decennial Census

=== 2020 census ===
As of the census of 2020, there were 40 people, 15 households, and 11 families residing in the city. The population density was 82.3 inhabitants per square mile (31.8/km^{2}). There were 19 housing units at an average density of 39.1 per square mile (15.1/km^{2}). The racial makeup of the city was 95.0% White, 0.0% Black or African American, 0.0% Native American, 0.0% Asian, 0.0% Pacific Islander, 0.0% from other races and 5.0% from two or more races. Hispanic or Latino persons of any race comprised 5.0% of the population.

Of the 15 households, 33.3% of which had children under the age of 18 living with them, 60.0% were married couples living together, 6.7% were cohabitating couples, 20.0% had a female householder with no spouse or partner present and 13.3% had a male householder with no spouse or partner present. 26.7% of all households were non-families. 20.0% of all households were made up of individuals, 6.7% had someone living alone who was 65 years old or older.

The median age in the city was 55.5 years. 22.5% of the residents were under the age of 20; 10.0% were between the ages of 20 and 24; 10.0% were from 25 and 44; 35.0% were from 45 and 64; and 22.5% were 65 years of age or older. The gender makeup of the city was 55.0% male and 45.0% female.

=== 2010 census ===
As of the census of 2010, there were 55 people, 23 households, and 17 families living in the city. The population density was 96.5 inhabitants per square mile (37.3/km^{2}). There were 26 housing units at an average density of 45.6 per square mile (17.6/km^{2}). The racial makeup of the city was 90.9% White and 9.1% from two or more races. Hispanic or Latino of any race were 3.6% of the population.

There were 23 households, of which 30.4% had children under the age of 18 living with them, 65.2% were married couples living together, 4.3% had a female householder with no husband present, 4.3% had a male householder with no wife present, and 26.1% were non-families. 26.1% of all households were made up of individuals, and 8.6% had someone living alone who was 65 years of age or older. The average household size was 2.39 and the average family size was 2.65.

The median age in the city was 44.8 years. 29.1% of residents were under the age of 18; 1.8% were between the ages of 18 and 24; 20.1% were from 25 to 44; 30.9% were from 45 to 64; and 18.2% were 65 years of age or older. The gender makeup of the city was 47.3% male and 52.7% female.

=== 2000 census ===
As of the census of 2000, there were 61 people, 24 households, and 19 families living in the city. The population density was 107.1 inhabitants per square mile (41.4/km^{2}). There were 31 housing units at an average density of 54.4 per square mile (21.0/km^{2}). The racial makeup of the city was 100.00% White.

There were 24 households, out of which 41.7% had children under the age of 18 living with them, 58.3% were married couples living together, 12.5% had a female householder with no husband present, and 20.8% were non-families. 16.7% of all households were made up of individuals, and 16.7% had someone living alone who was 65 years of age or older. The average household size was 2.54 and the average family size was 2.89.

In the city, the population was spread out, with 31.1% under the age of 18, 3.3% from 18 to 24, 27.9% from 25 to 44, 27.9% from 45 to 64, and 9.8% who were 65 years of age or older. The median age was 38 years. For every 100 females, there were 117.9 males. For every 100 females age 18 and over, there were 110.0 males.

The median income for a household in the city was $34,000, and the median income for a family was $34,000. Males had a median income of $25,714 versus $25,000 for females. The per capita income for the city was $15,525. There were no families and 3.8% of the population living below the poverty line, including no under eighteens and 33.3% of those over 64.

== Education ==
It is within the Twin Rivers Community School District.
