= Humboldt County, Iowa =

County in Iowa, United States

- County
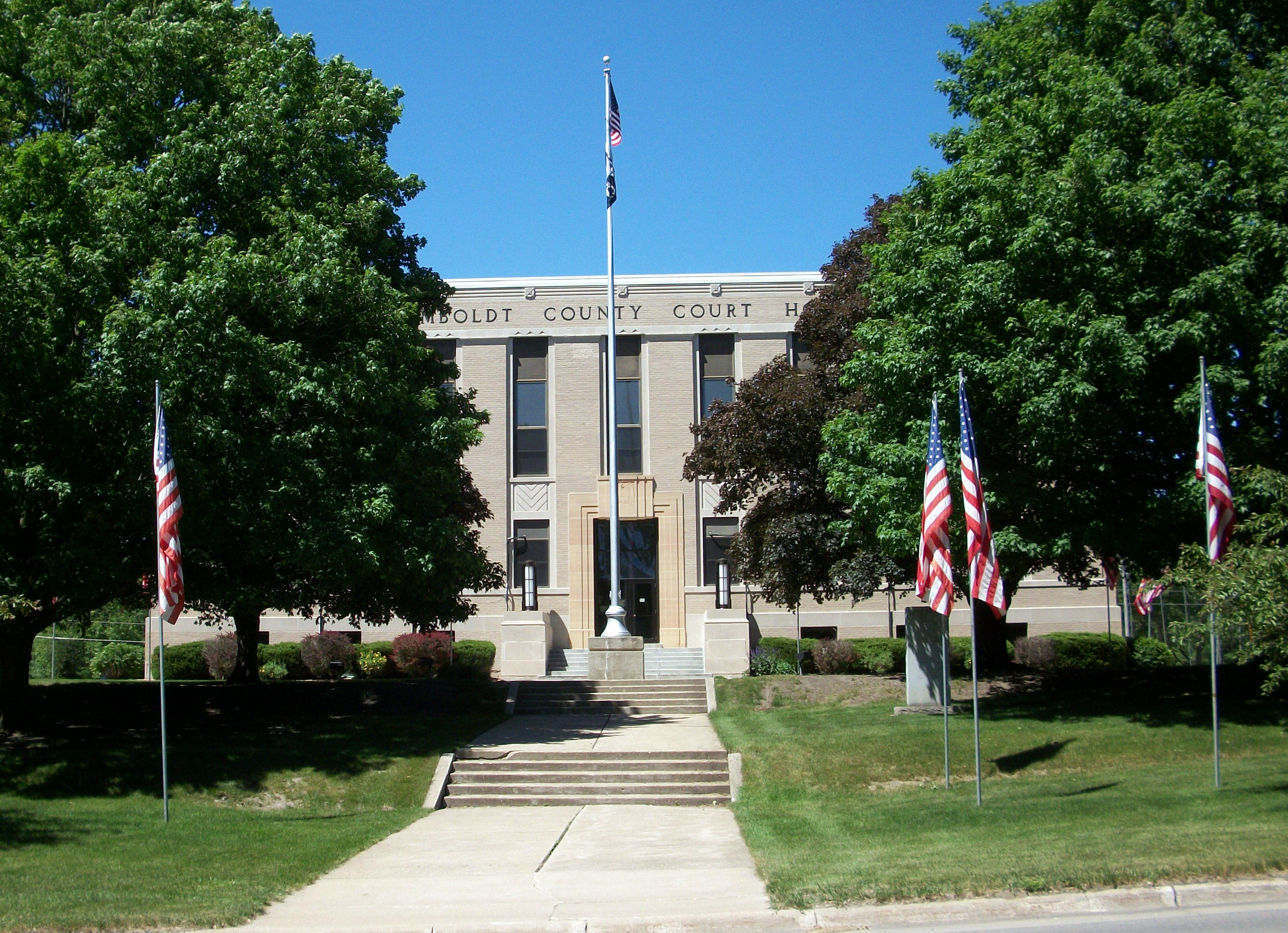
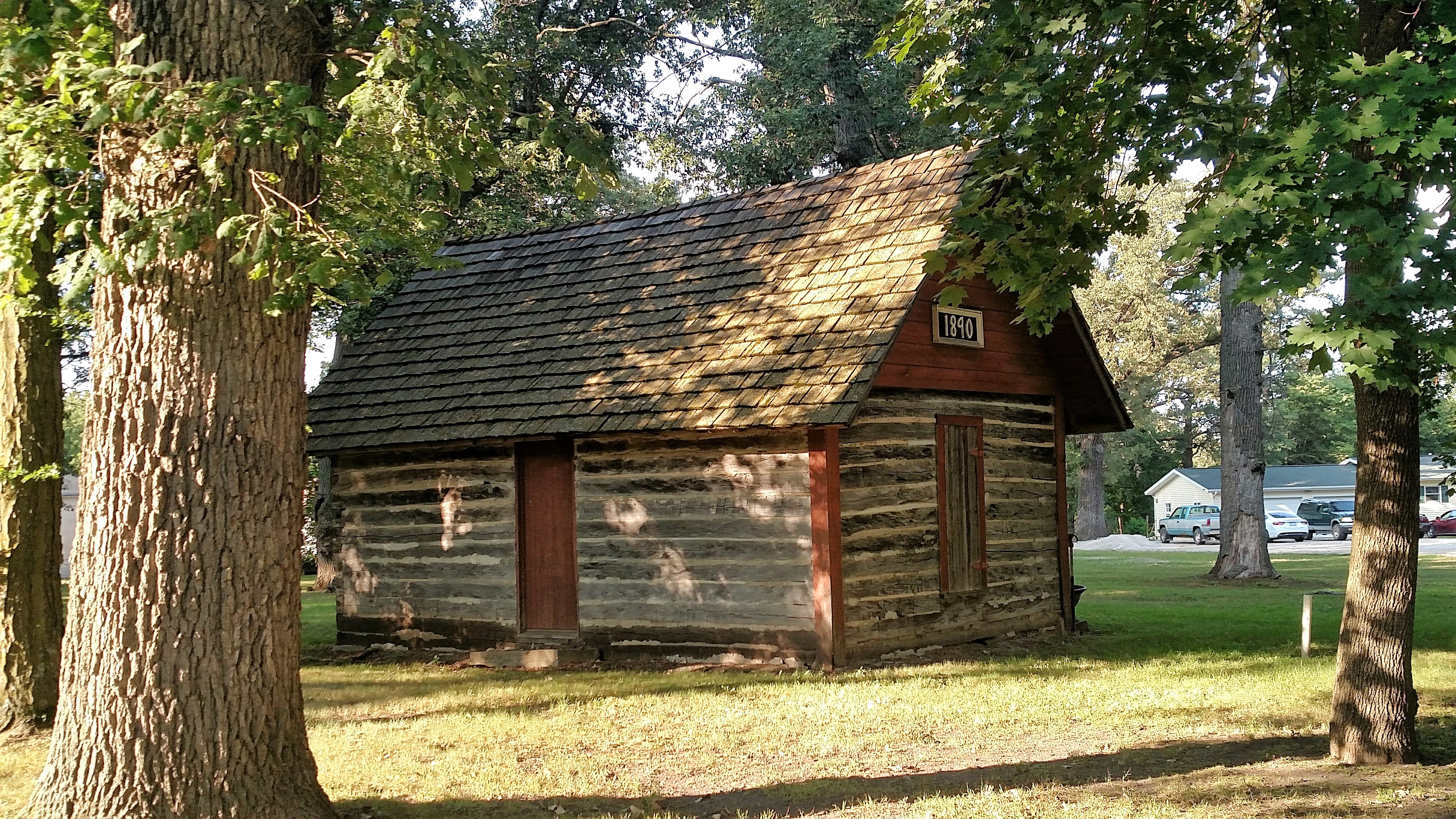
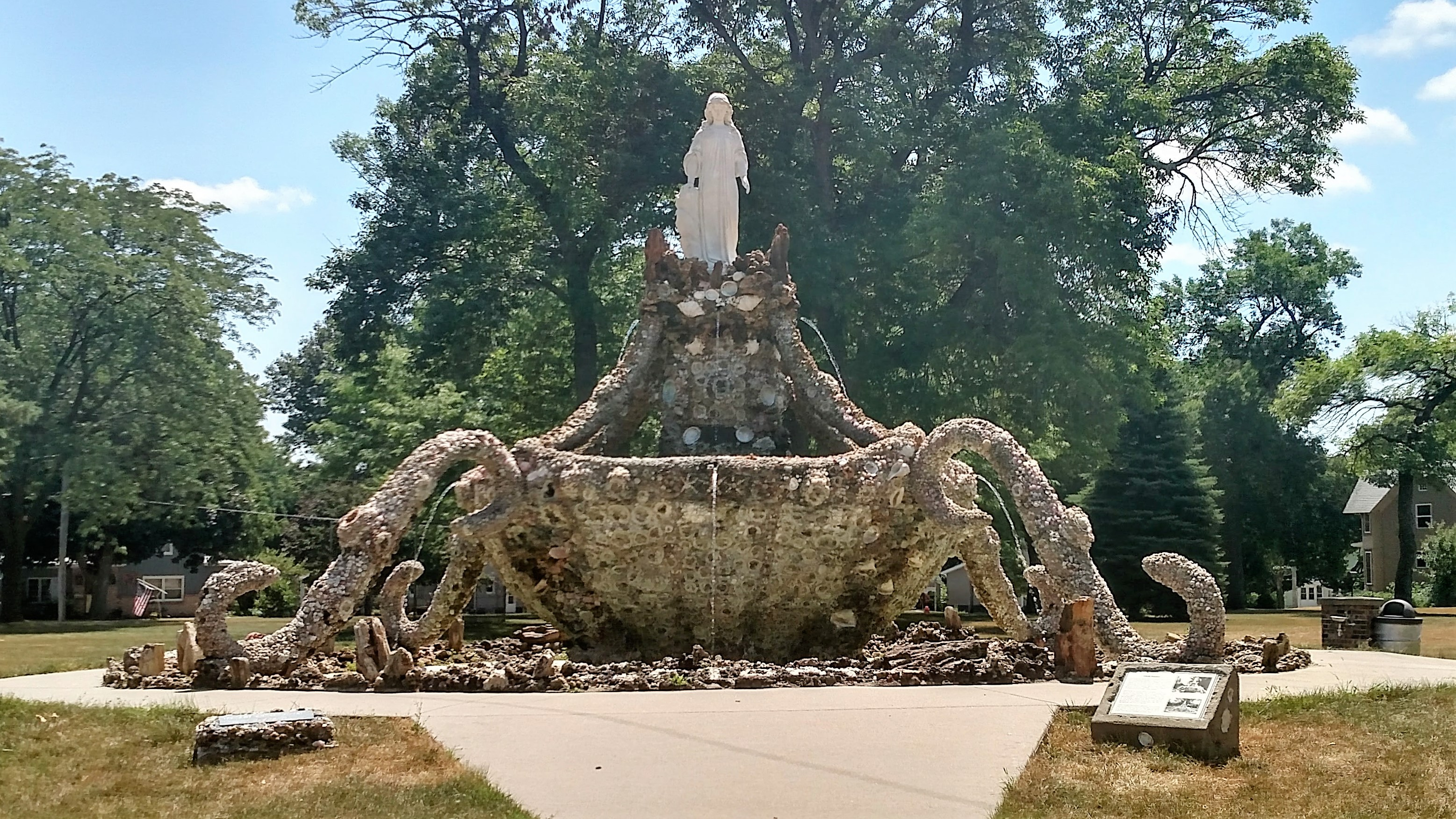
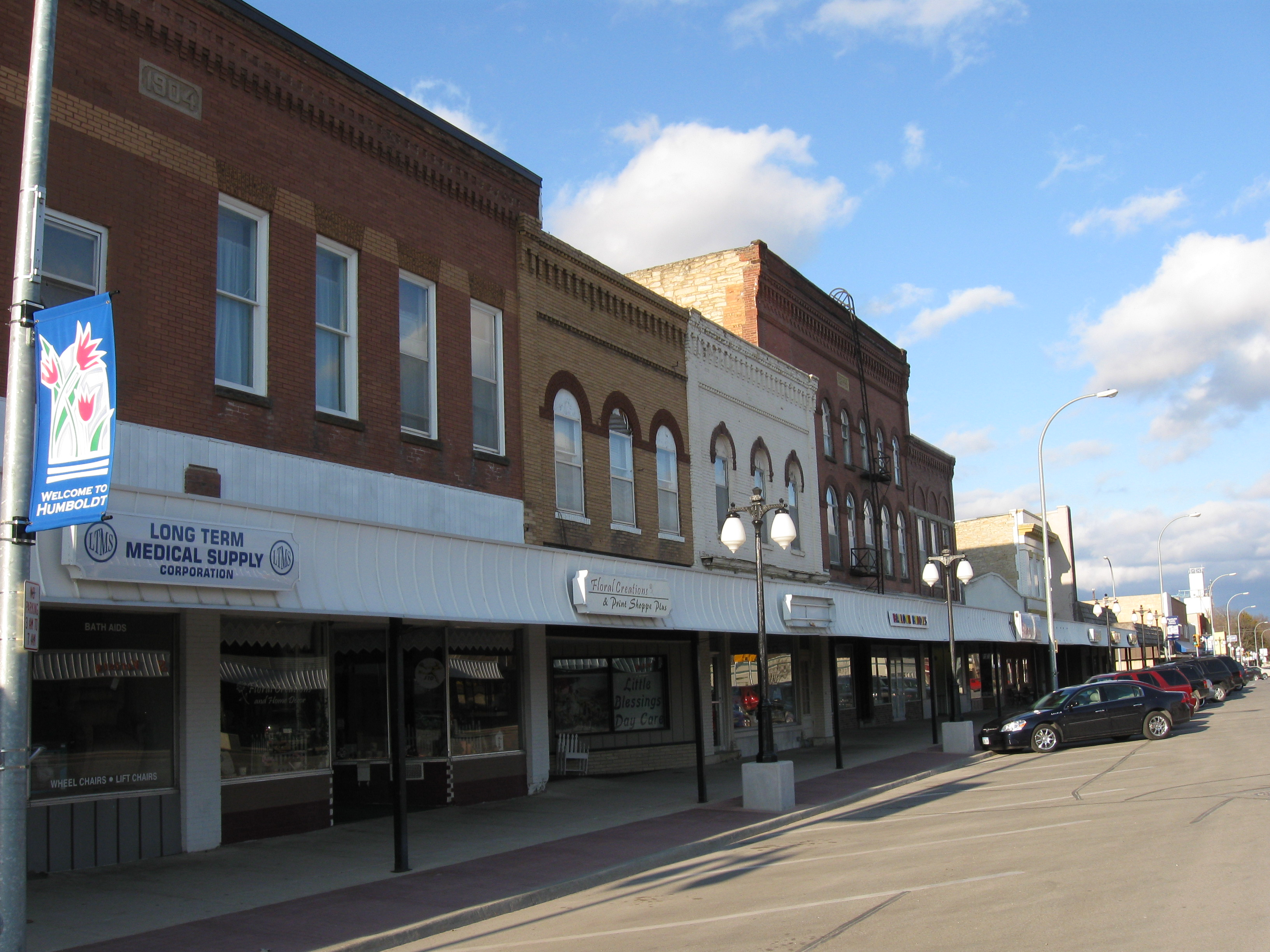
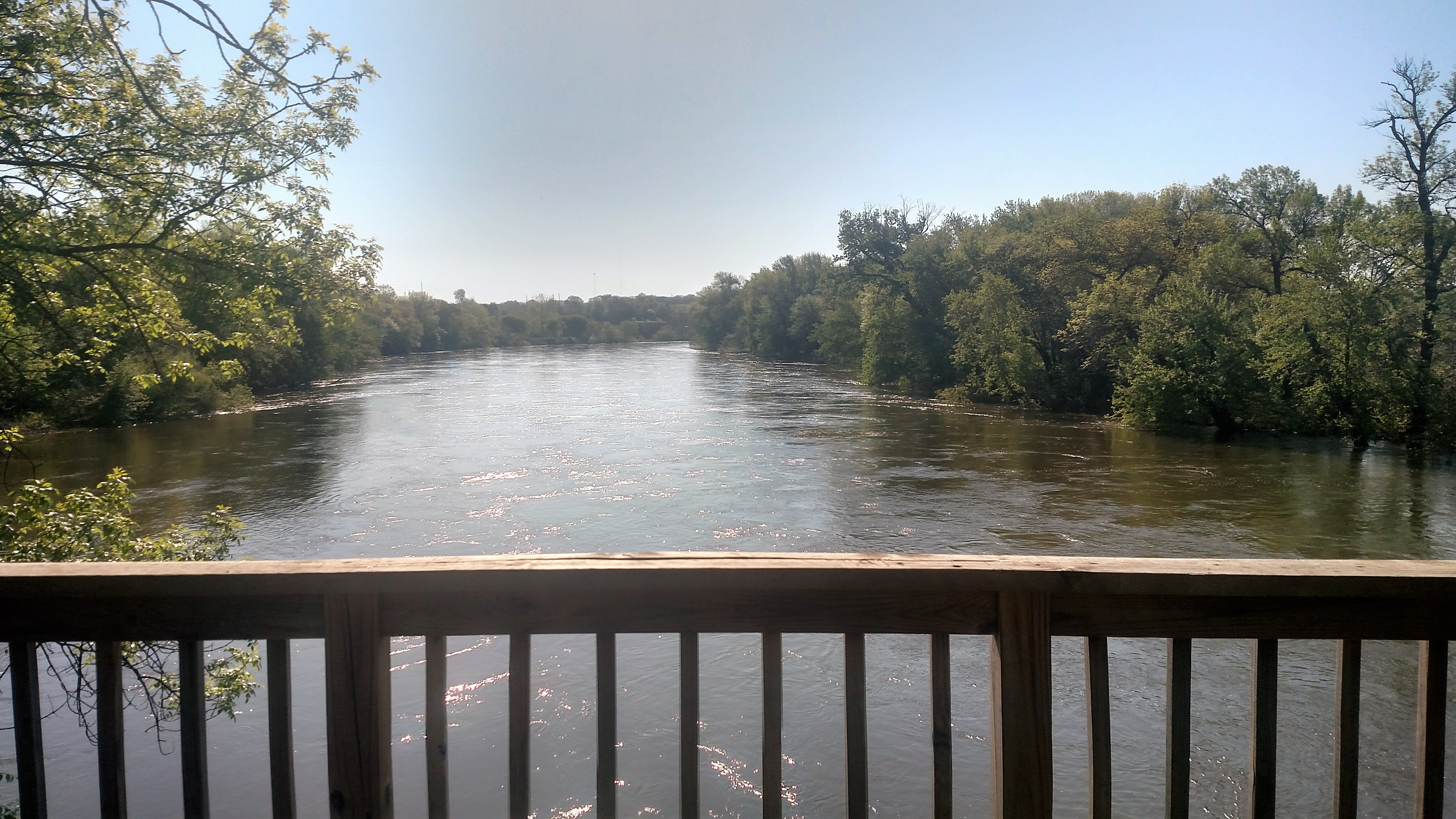
- Humboldt County Courthouse Old Settler's Park in Livermore Fountain in Humboldt's John Brown Park Sumner Avenue in Humboldt The Des Moines River at Gotch Park

- Location within the U.S. state of Iowa
- Coordinates: 42.782221°N 94.202775°W
- Country: United States
- State: Iowa
- Founded: January 15, 1851 (created); February 26, 1857 (re-created)
- Named for: Alexander von Humboldt
- Seat: Dakota City
- Largest city: Humboldt

Area
  - Total: 435.674 sq mi (1,128.39 km^{2})
  - Land: 434.372 sq mi (1,125.02 km^{2})
  - Water: 1.302 sq mi (3.37 km^{2}) 0.3%

Population (2020)
  - Total: 9,597
  - Estimate (2025): 9,409 ▼
  - Density: 22.09/sq mi (8.531/km^{2})
- Time zone: UTC−6 (Central)
  - Summer (DST): UTC−5 (CDT)
- Area code: 515
- Congressional district: 4th
- Website: humboldtcounty.iowa.gov
- Iowa county number 46

Humboldt County is a county in the U.S. state of Iowa. As of the 2020 census, the population was 9,597, and was estimated to be 9,409 in 2025. The county seat is Dakota City and the largest city is Humboldt. The county was created on January 15, 1851, re-created on February 26, 1857, and named in honor of Alexander von Humboldt.

== History ==
=== Founding ===
Iowa's entry to the union was approved by Congress on March 3, 1845, with statehood beginning on December 28, 1846, following approval of the state's constitution and boundaries. In order to establish county government across the state, the Iowa General Assembly passed an act on January 15, 1851, which created fifty counties in the half of the state where county government had not yet been established. Humboldt County was created by this act, containing its present area, as well as four townships in present-day Webster County: Jackson, Deer Creek, Badger, and Newark. It was named after Alexander von Humboldt. On January 21, 1855, an act merged the northern half of Humboldt County and Bancroft County into Kossuth County, with the southern half of Humboldt County merging into Webster County.

The Sixth General Assembly passed another act, reestablishing Humboldt County. The act was passed on January 28, 1857, and went into effect on February 26. However, an error omitted the lower four townships (Jackson, Deer Creek, Badger, and Newark) from returning to Humboldt County. The error was not caught until the next session of the general assembly, and the general assembly passed a bill redefining Humboldt County to include the four townships on March 11, 1858. However, in the interceding time, the Constitution of Iowa came into effect, including the provision that "future laws altering county boundaries should be submitted to a vote of the people of the counties concerned and must be approved by them before going into effect". In a court case originating in the disputed area, the Iowa Supreme Court was asked to decide which county court had original jurisdiction. In their clarification, they ruled the March 11, 1858, clarification of Humboldt County's boundaries unconstitutional, as it had not been submitted to a public vote in the counties involved. In his decision, Chief Justice Ralph P. Lowe wrote, "We are compelled to conclude that township 90, in ranges 27 to 30, west of the 5th principal meridian, is still in and forms a part of Webster county. Of course we can pay no attention to conjectural surmises and vague suspicions, which have been made and entertained in relation to some unfairness which may have been practiced in the final passage of the act of 1857, creating the county of Humboldt. If such was the case, no evidence of the fact has been presented to us." The "vague suspicions" include a rumor that John Duncombe of Fort Dodge (namesake of Duncombe, Iowa and plaintiff in the lawsuit) had tricked Humboldt County into ceding the southern four townships to Webster County "on loan", or was otherwise responsible for the "error".

In 1872, Humboldt College was opened and closed in 1916 because there was no agreement with the county about taxation.

== Geography ==
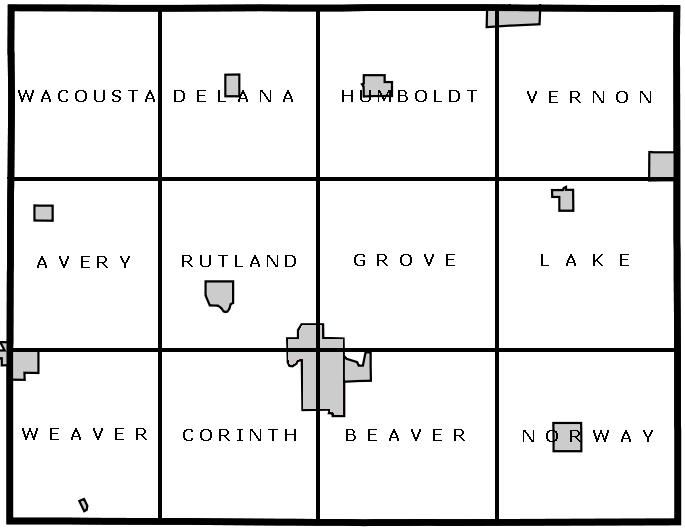
Humboldt County is divided into 12 townships.

According to the United States Census Bureau, the county has a total area of 435.674 square miles (1,128.39 km^{2}), of which 434.372 square miles (1,125.02 km^{2}) is land and 1.302 square miles (3.37 km^{2}) (0.3%) is water. It is the 83rd largest county in Iowa by total area.

Unlike all counties to its east and west, Humboldt County has only 12 townships. Although founded with the standard 16 townships on January 15, 1851, the county was removed from existence in 1855.

=== Adjacent counties ===
- Kossuth County (north)
- Wright County (east)
- Webster County (south)
- Pocahontas County (west)

=== Ecology ===
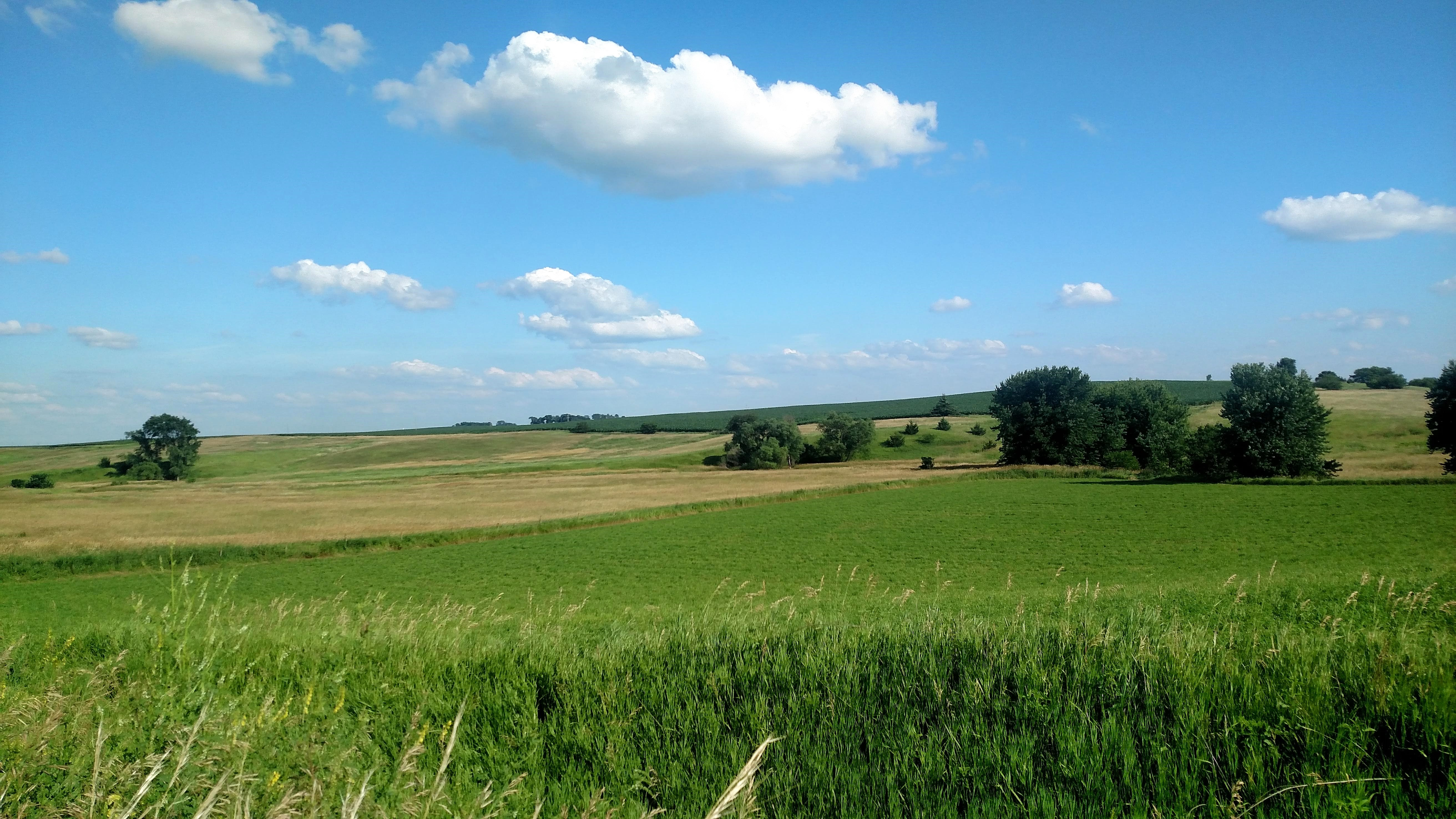
Rolling topography along Indian Creek in southern Humboldt County

Humboldt County is located entirely within the Des Moines Lobe of the Western Corn Belt Plains ecoregion, as defined by the United States Environmental Protection Agency (EPA). One of the flattest regions in Iowa, the Des Moines Lobe ecoregion is a distinctive area naturally defined by Wisconsin glaciation but modified by humans for extensive agriculture. In general, the land is level to gently rolling with some areas of relief defined by glacial features like moraines, hummocky knobs, and kettles, and outwash deposits. The lobe does not have any loess deposits like the Loess Hills to the west.

The stream network is poorly developed and widely spaced, with major rivers carving valleys that are relatively deep and steep-sided. Almost all of the natural lakes of Iowa are found in the northern part of this region (the Iowa Great Lakes). Most of the region has been converted from wet prairie to agricultural use with substantial surface water drainage. Only a small fraction of the wetlands remain, and many natural lakes have been drained as a result of agricultural drainage projects via drainage tiles or ditches.

=== Hydrology ===
Looking upstream along West Fork Des Moines River at US 169 bridge in Humboldt

Humboldt County is located within the Des Moines River watershed. The East and West Forks of the Des Moines River merge at Frank Gotch State Park in southern Humboldt County. The eastern part of Humboldt County is within the Boone River watershed, a tributary of the Des Moines.

=== Protected areas ===
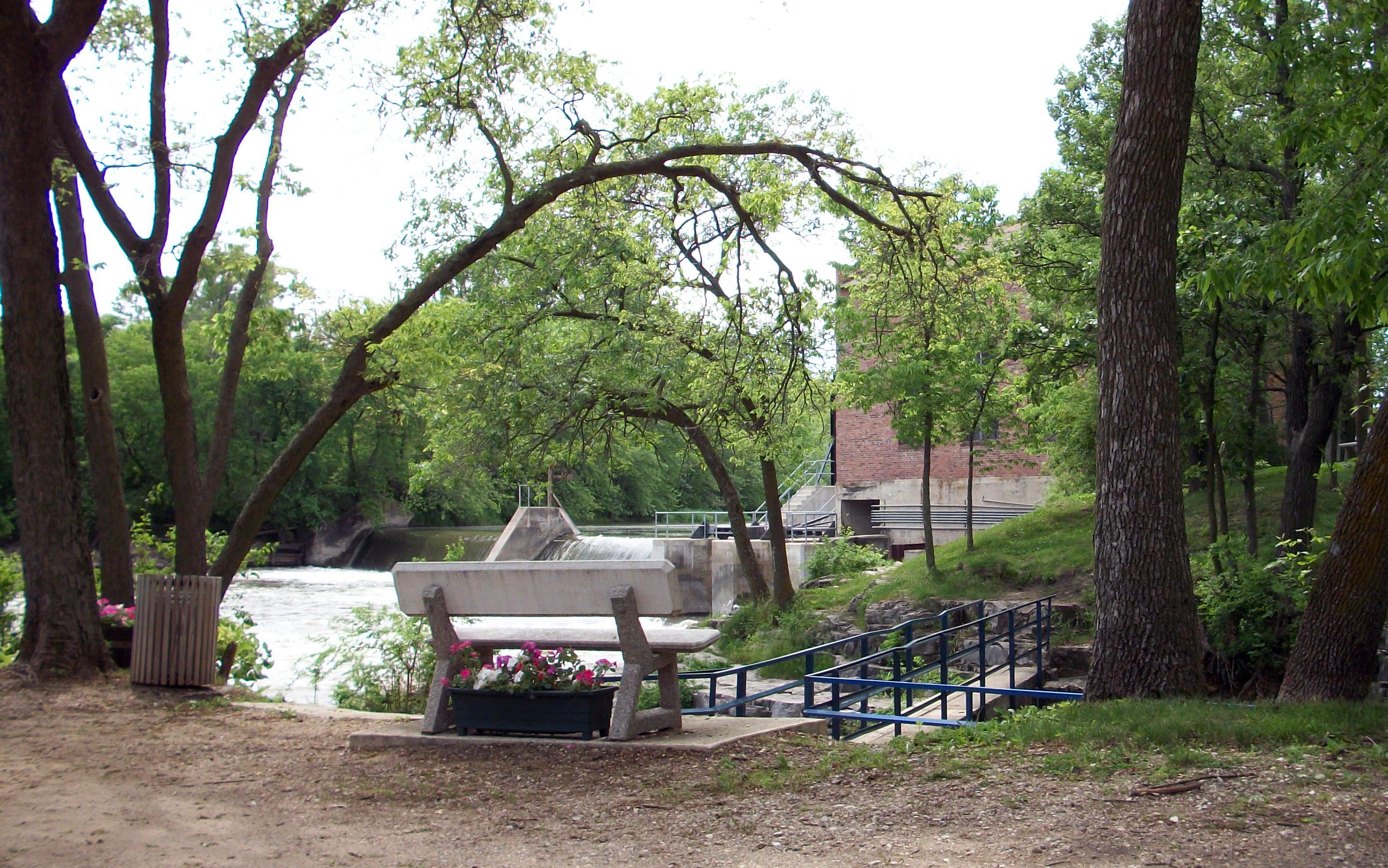
The Rutland dam in Rose Mill Park.

While Humboldt County does not have any state parks, it has county parks. South of Humboldt is Frank A. Gotch County Park. It is named for Frank Gotch, a world-champion, undefeated wrestler from Humboldt. The park is near his childhood farm and is also home to the confluence of the East and West Forks of the Des Moines River. The park features campgrounds and a well-known converted railroad bridge used by the Minneapolis and St. Louis Railway. The bridge is part of the Three Rivers Trail, a converted rail route that runs from Eagle Grove west to Rolfe.

Near Bradgate is the Willow Access Area. The terrain is very wooded. In south Rutland is Rose Mill Park. The area can be used for camping and also has access to the Rutland Dam and West Fork of the Des Moines River. The dam is being restored, and most of the park is new. The river is known for its forested limestone bluffs and grassy banks.

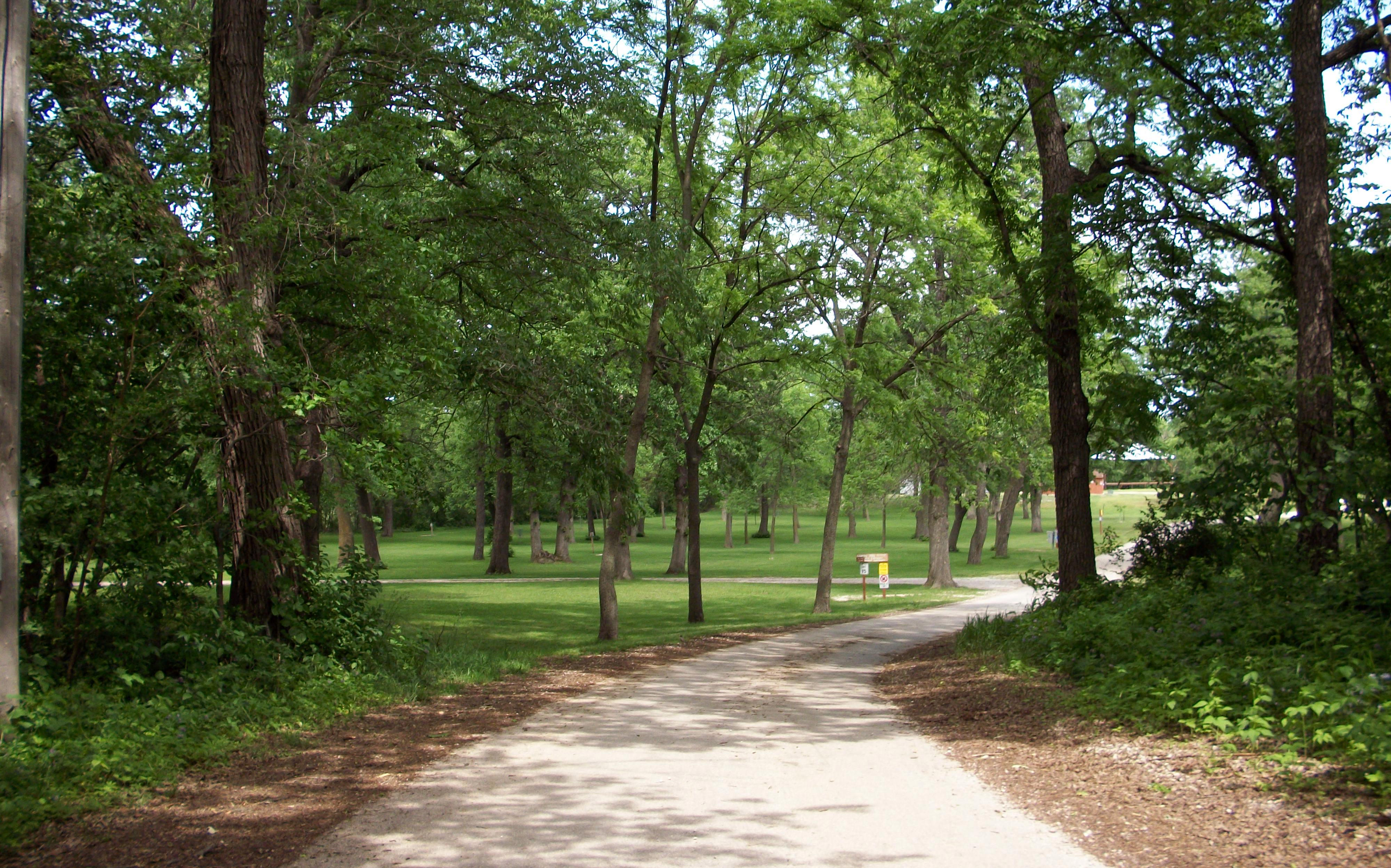
The lower portion of Joe Sheldon Park.

Further downriver near Humboldt is Oxbow Park, which contains boating access ramps and much scenic open space. The park's southern border is Iowa Highway 3, and south of that is Joe Sheldon County Park. The park is split into two sections, one mostly for camping and one focused on recreation. There is access to the West Fork of the Des Moines River from the lower part of the park.

Continuing along the river, the Lake Nokomis area begins, popular for its woods and small ponds. The Cottonwood Trail also runs through the area.

West of Livermore, Lott's Park allows access to Lott's Creek. The park has many benches and picnic tables. South of Ottosen is the Ottosen Marsh State Game Management Area, colloquially the Ottosen Potholes. East of Dakota City is the Dakota City River Park, near an old dam and the Humboldt County Historical Museum. Near the unincorporated community of Pioneer is the Pioneer Prairie Pothole Wildlife Area.

== Demographics ==
Historical population
Census	Pop.	Note	%±
1860	332		—
1870	2,596		681.9%
1880	5,341		105.7%
1890	9,836		84.2%
1900	12,667		28.8%
1910	12,182		−3.8%
1920	12,951		6.3%
1930	13,202		1.9%
1940	13,459		1.9%
1950	13,117		−2.5%
1960	13,156		0.3%
1970	12,519		−4.8%
1980	12,246		−2.2%
1990	10,756		−12.2%
2000	10,381		−3.5%
2010	9,815		−5.5%
2020	9,597		−2.2%
2025 (est.)	9,409	▼	−2.0%
U.S. Decennial Census; 1790–1960 1900–1990; 1990–2000 2010–2020

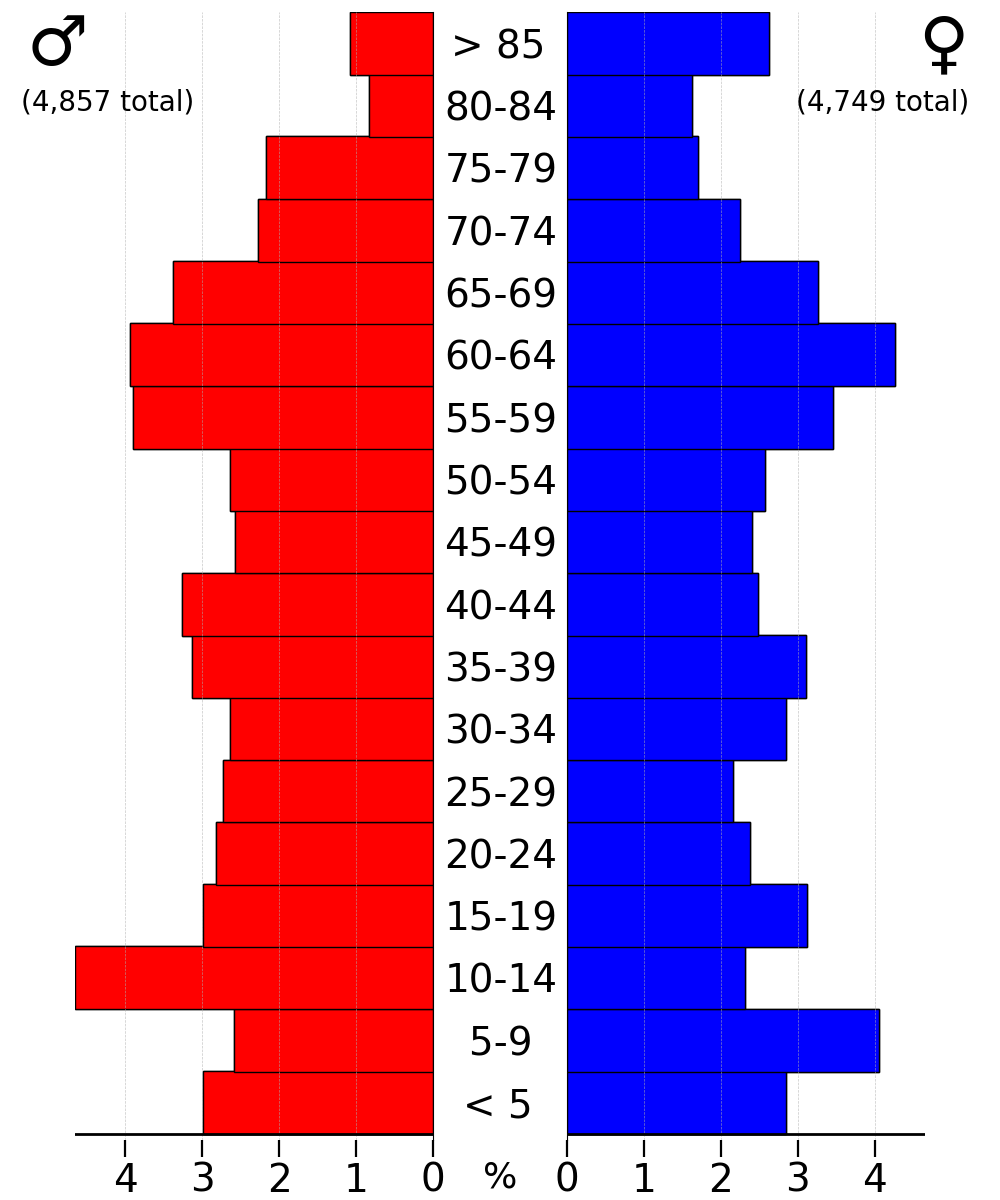
2022 US Census population pyramid for Humboldt County from ACS 5-year estimates

As of the second quarter of 2025, the median home value in Humboldt County was $165,277.

As of the 2023 American Community Survey, there are 4,236 estimated households in Humboldt County with an average of 2.23 persons per household. The county has a median household income of $66,994. Approximately 13.7% of the county's population lives at or below the poverty line. Hamilton County has an estimated 61.7% employment rate, with 19.3% of the population holding a bachelor's degree or higher and 93.6% holding a high school diploma. There were 4,600 housing units at an average density of 10.59 per square mile (4.1/km^{2}).

The top five reported languages (people were allowed to report up to two languages, thus the figures will generally add to more than 100%) were English (94.8%), Spanish (3.8%), Indo-European (0.4%), Asian and Pacific Islander (0.9%), and Other (0.0%).

The median age in the county was 41.8 years.

Humboldt County, Iowa – racial and ethnic composition Note: the US Census treats Hispanic/Latino as an ethnic category. This table excludes Latinos from the racial categories and assigns them to a separate category. Hispanics/Latinos may be of any race.
Race / ethnicity (NH = non-Hispanic)	Pop. 1980	Pop. 1990	Pop. 2000	Pop. 2010	Pop. 2020
White alone (NH)	12,150 (99.22%)	10,670 (99.20%)	10,188 (98.14%)	9,288 (94.63%)	8,823 (91.93%)
Black or African American alone (NH)	11 (0.09%)	9 (0.08%)	7 (0.07%)	39 (0.40%)	53 (0.55%)
Native American or Alaska Native alone (NH)	7 (0.06%)	15 (0.14%)	6 (0.06%)	14 (0.14%)	16 (0.17%)
Asian alone (NH)	13 (0.11%)	25 (0.23%)	24 (0.23%)	31 (0.32%)	21 (0.22%)
Pacific Islander alone (NH)	—	—	10 (0.10%)	0 (0.00%)	6 (0.06%)
Other race alone (NH)	12 (0.10%)	0 (0.00%)	0 (0.00%)	4 (0.04%)	22 (0.23%)
Mixed race or multiracial (NH)	—	—	46 (0.44%)	82 (0.84%)	226 (2.35%)
Hispanic or Latino (any race)	53 (0.43%)	37 (0.34%)	100 (0.96%)	357 (3.64%)	430 (4.48%)
Total	12,246 (100.00%)	10,756 (100.00%)	10,381 (100.00%)	9,815 (100.00%)	9,597 (100.00%)

=== 2024 estimate ===
As of the 2024 estimate, there were 9,617 people, 4,236 households, and _ families residing in the county. The population density was 22.14 inhabitants per square mile (8.5/km^{2}). There were 4,600 housing units at an average density of 10.59 per square mile (4.1/km^{2}). The racial makeup of the county was 96.3% White (90.1% NH White), 1.1% African American, 0.5% Native American, 0.6% Asian, 0.0% Pacific Islander, _% from some other races and 1.5% from two or more races. Hispanic or Latino people of any race were 7.0% of the population.

=== 2020 census ===
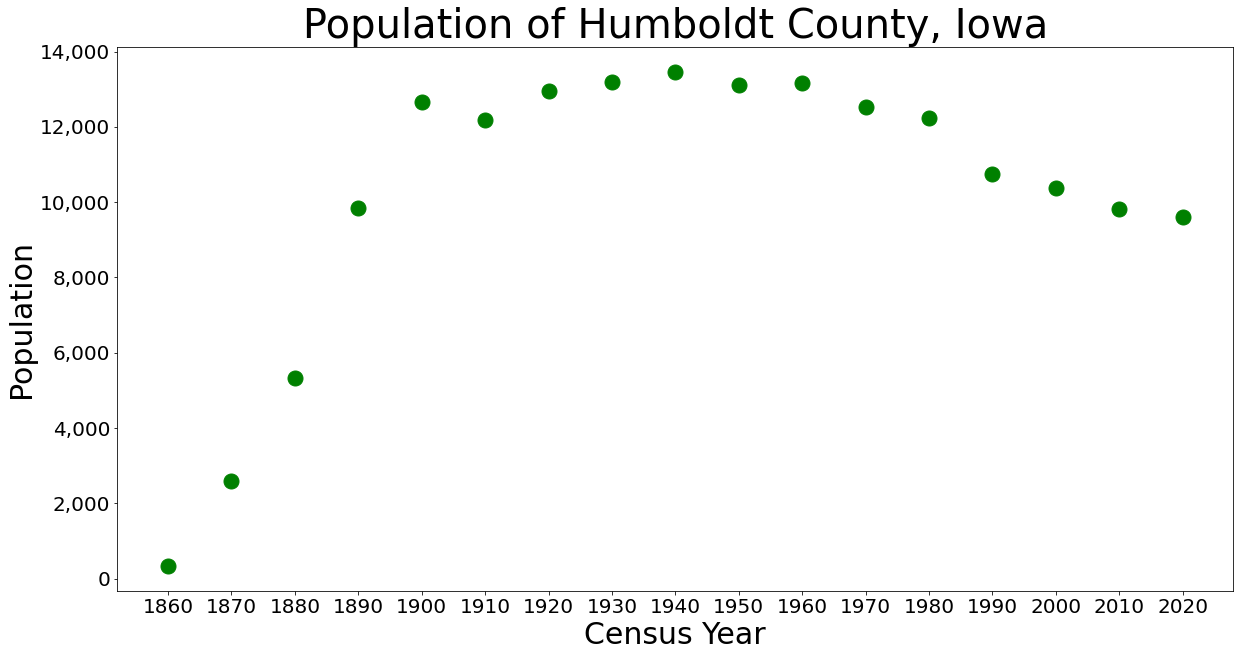
Population of Humboldt County from US census data

As of the 2020 census, there were 9,597 people, 4,073 households, and 2,568 families residing in the county. The population density was 22.09 inhabitants per square mile (8.5/km^{2}). There were 4,571 housing units at an average density of 10.52 per square mile (4.1/km^{2}). The racial makeup of the county was 92.95% White, 0.58% African American, 0.17% Native American, 0.22% Asian, 0.06% Pacific Islander, 2.81% from some other races and 3.21% from two or more races. Hispanic or Latino people of any race were 4.48% of the population.

The median age was 41.8 years. 24.3% of residents were under the age of 18 and 21.1% of residents were 65 years of age or older. For every 100 females there were 97.6 males, and for every 100 females age 18 and over there were 98.1 males age 18 and over.

55.6% of residents lived in urban areas, while 44.4% lived in rural areas.

There were 4,073 households in the county, of which 27.6% had children under the age of 18 living in them. Of all households, 50.8% were married-couple households, 19.8% were households with a male householder and no spouse or partner present, and 23.4% were households with a female householder and no spouse or partner present. About 32.0% of all households were made up of individuals and 15.4% had someone living alone who was 65 years of age or older. The 4,571 housing units included 4,073 occupied units (10.9% vacant); among occupied units, 75.4% were owner-occupied and 24.6% were renter-occupied. The homeowner vacancy rate was 2.3% and the rental vacancy rate was 7.7%.

=== 2010 census ===
As of the 2010 census, there were 9,815 people in the county, with a population density of 22.6/sq mi (8.7/km^{2}). There were 4,684 housing units, of which 4,209 were occupied.

=== 2000 census ===
As of the 2000 census, there were 10,381 people, 4,295 households, and 2,881 families residing in the county. The population density was 24 people per square mile (9.3 people/km^{2}). There were 4,645 housing units at an average density of 11 units per square mile (4.2 units/km^{2}). The racial makeup of the county was 98.63% White, 0.11% Black or African American, 0.06% Native American, 0.23% Asian, 0.10% Pacific Islander, 0.40% from other races, and 0.47% from two or more races. 0.96% of the population were Hispanic or Latino of any race.

There were 4,295 households, out of which 29.70% had children under the age of 18 living with them, 57.40% were married couples living together, 6.40% had a female householder with no husband present, and 32.90% were non-families. 29.80% of all households were made up of individuals, and 16.30% had someone living alone who was 65 years of age or older. The average household size was 2.38 and the average family size was 2.94.

In the county, the population was spread out, with 24.90% under the age of 18, 7.00% from 18 to 24, 24.60% from 25 to 44, 22.50% from 45 to 64, and 21.00% who were 65 years of age or older. The median age was 41 years. For every 100 females there were 95.70 males. For every 100 females age 18 and over, there were 92.20 males.

The median income for a household in the county was $38,201, and the median income for a family was $46,510. Males had a median income of $31,004 versus $22,312 for females. The per capita income for the county was $18,300. About 5.30% of families and 8.30% of the population were below the poverty line, including 13.80% of those under age 18 and 5.10% of those age 65 or over.

== Communities ==
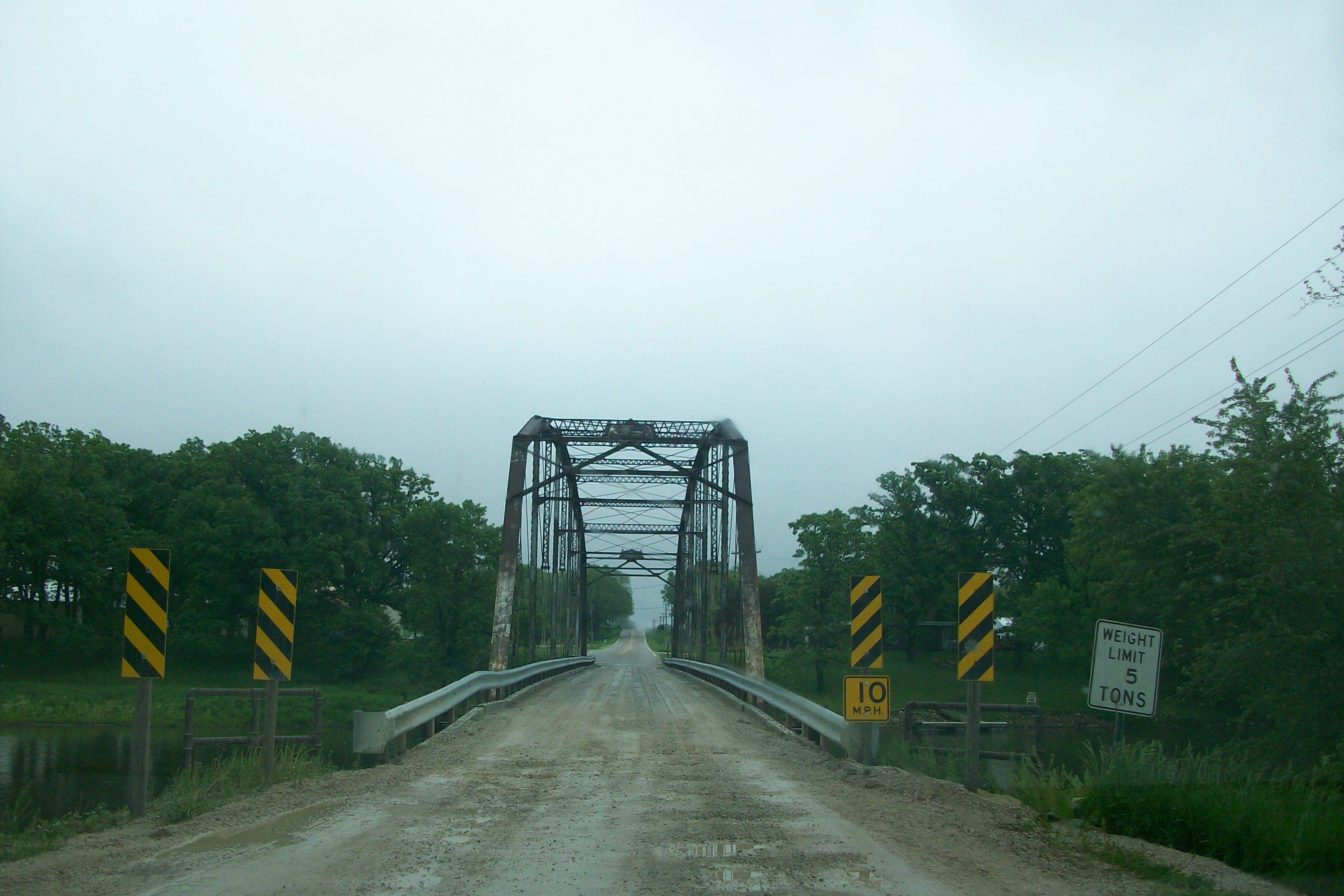
Berkhimer Bridge, located northwest of Humboldt, was built in 1899.

=== Cities ===
- Bode
- Bradgate
- Dakota City
- Gilmore City
- Hardy
- Humboldt
- Livermore
- Lu Verne
- Ottosen
- Renwick
- Rutland
- Thor

=== Unincorporated communities ===
- Arnold
- Pioneer

=== Ghost town ===
- Unique

=== Townships ===
- Avery
- Beaver
- Corinth
- Delana
- Grove
- Humboldt
- Lake
- Norway
- Rutland
- Vernon
- Wacousta
- Weaver

=== Population ranking ===
The population ranking of the following table is based on the 2020 census of Humboldt County.

† county seat

Rank	City/Town/etc.	Municipal type	Population (2020 Census)
1	Humboldt	City	4,792
2	† Dakota City	City	759
3	Livermore	City	381
4	Bode	City	302
5	Gilmore City (partially in Pocahontas County)	City	270 (487 total)
6	Renwick	City	234
7	Thor	City	181
8	Rutland	City	113
9	Bradgate	City	75
10	Hardy	City	57
11	Ottosen	City	40
12	Lu Verne (partially in Kossuth County)	City	30 (258 total)
13	Pioneer	City	4

== Politics ==
Beginning in 1952, Humboldt County has been strongly Republican, only voting Democratic twice in that span, in 1964 during a nationwide landslide for Lyndon B. Johnson and in 1988 for Michael Dukakis who performed very strongly throughout Iowa in part due to the ongoing farm crisis.

United States presidential election results for Humboldt County, Iowa
Year	Republican		Democratic		Third party(ies)	
Year	No.	%	No.	%	No.	%
1896	2,010	71.18%	783	27.73%	31	1.10%
1900	2,214	77.88%	595	20.93%	34	1.20%
1904	1,950	81.76%	369	15.47%	66	2.77%
1908	1,818	73.66%	587	23.78%	63	2.55%
1912	477	18.76%	634	24.93%	1,432	56.31%
1916	1,676	66.69%	809	32.19%	28	1.11%
1920	3,577	82.82%	681	15.77%	61	1.41%
1924	2,841	59.71%	370	7.78%	1,547	32.51%
1928	2,828	62.52%	1,679	37.12%	16	0.35%
1932	2,028	41.48%	2,804	57.35%	57	1.17%
1936	2,262	39.02%	3,420	59.00%	115	1.98%
1940	2,853	46.44%	3,268	53.20%	22	0.36%
1944	2,525	47.73%	2,749	51.97%	16	0.30%
1948	2,498	45.99%	2,855	52.56%	79	1.45%
1952	4,534	67.94%	2,124	31.82%	16	0.24%
1956	3,747	57.58%	2,756	42.35%	4	0.06%
1960	3,537	56.66%	2,706	43.34%	0	0.00%
1964	2,250	39.96%	3,376	59.96%	4	0.07%
1968	3,239	59.87%	1,940	35.86%	231	4.27%
1972	3,622	62.53%	2,062	35.60%	108	1.86%
1976	3,075	52.65%	2,677	45.83%	89	1.52%
1980	3,575	60.60%	1,840	31.19%	484	8.20%
1984	3,396	57.92%	2,406	41.04%	61	1.04%
1988	2,594	48.42%	2,713	50.64%	50	0.93%
1992	2,299	44.34%	1,765	34.04%	1,121	21.62%
1996	2,236	45.33%	2,080	42.17%	617	12.51%
2000	2,846	57.61%	1,949	39.45%	145	2.94%
2004	3,162	59.10%	2,146	40.11%	42	0.79%
2008	2,895	56.51%	2,160	42.16%	68	1.33%
2012	3,099	60.08%	1,972	38.23%	87	1.69%
2016	3,568	70.14%	1,252	24.61%	267	5.25%
2020	3,819	71.69%	1,442	27.07%	66	1.24%
2024	3,770	74.17%	1,236	24.32%	77	1.51%

== Infrastructure ==
=== Major highways ===
- U.S. Highway 169
- Iowa Highway 3
- Iowa Highway 15
- Iowa Highway 17
- Humboldt County routes

== Education ==
School districts include:

- Algona Community School District
- Clarion-Goldfield-Dows Community School District
- Eagle Grove Community School District
- Gilmore City-Bradgate Community School District
- Humboldt Community School District
- Twin Rivers Community School District
- West Bend-Mallard Community School District

Former school districts:

- Clarion-Goldfield Community School District, consolidated into Clarion-Goldfield-Dows CSD on July 1, 2014.
- Lu Verne Community School District, consolidated into Algona CSD on July 1, 2023.
- Boone Valley Community School District, Renwick, dissolved July 1, 1988

== See also ==
- National Register of Historic Places listings in Humboldt County, Iowa
