= Garfield Township, Kossuth County, Iowa =

Township in Kossuth County, Iowa, U.S.

Coordinates: 42.9517°N 94.3839°W

Garfield Township is a township in Kossuth County, Iowa, United States.

== History ==
Garfield Township was organized in 1885. It is named for President James A. Garfield.
