= Garfield Township, Pocahontas County, Iowa =

Township in Pocahontas County, Iowa, USA

Coordinates: 42.775°N 94.501°W

Garfield Township is a township in Pocahontas County, Iowa, United States.

== History ==
Garfield Township was created from land given by Clinton Township in 1903.
