= Riverdale Township, Kossuth County, Iowa =

Township in Kossuth County, Iowa, U.S.

Coordinates: 42.9517°N 94.2661°W

Riverdale Township is a township in Kossuth County, Iowa, United States.

== History ==
Riverdale Township was organized in 1885.
