= Rutland, Iowa =

- City
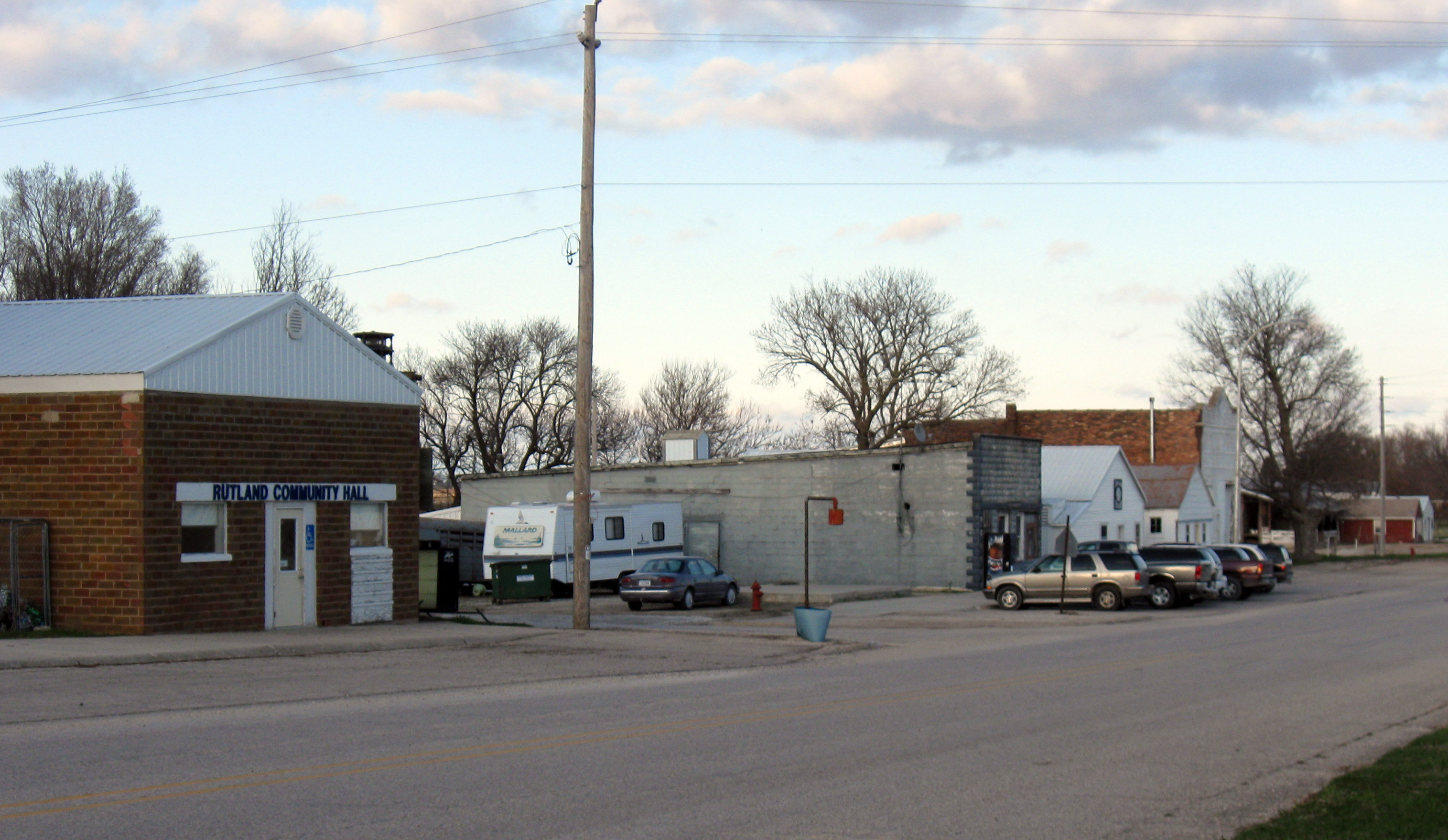
- Streetside in Rutland

- Location of Rutland, Iowa
- Coordinates: 42°45′41″N 94°17′43″W
- Country: USA
- State: Iowa
- County: Humboldt

Area
  - Total: 0.90 sq mi (2.33 km^{2})
  - Land: 0.90 sq mi (2.33 km^{2})
  - Water: 0 sq mi (0.00 km^{2})
- Elevation: 1,135 ft (346 m)

Population (2020)
  - Total: 113
  - Density: 125.7/sq mi (48.52/km^{2})
- Time zone: UTC-6 (Central (CST))
  - Summer (DST): UTC-5 (CDT)
- ZIP code: 50582
- Area code: 515
- FIPS code: 19-69375
- GNIS feature ID: 2396461

Rutland is a city in Humboldt County, Iowa, United States. The population was 113 at the time of the 2020 census.

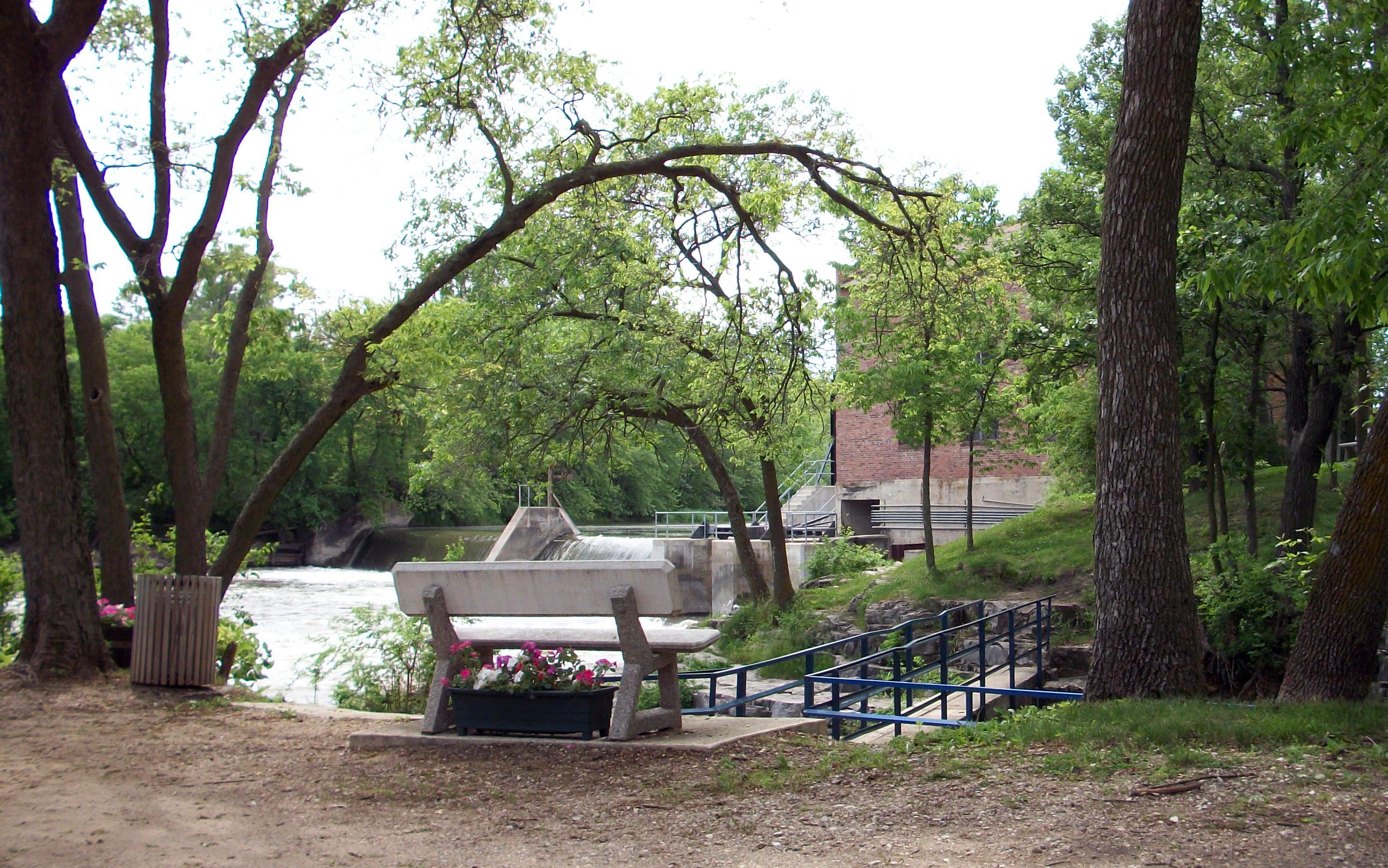
The Rutland dam is a big attraction in Humboldt County.

== History ==
Rutland was platted in 1869. It was named after Rutland, Vermont.

Rutland was formerly serviced by Iowa Highway 367, which was decommissioned in 1980.

== Geography ==
Rutland is located on the West Fork Des Moines River.

According to the United States Census Bureau, the city has a total area of 0.90 square miles (2.33 km^{2}), all land.

== Demographics ==
Historical populations
Year	Pop.	±%
1910	212	—
1920	197	−7.1%
1930	222	+12.7%
1940	255	+14.9%
1950	225	−11.8%
1960	221	−1.8%
1970	215	−2.7%
1980	163	−24.2%
1990	149	−8.6%
2000	145	−2.7%
2010	126	−13.1%
2020	113	−10.3%
Sources: Source: U.S. Decennial Census

=== 2020 census ===
As of the census of 2020, there were 113 people, 54 households, and 33 families residing in the city. The population density was 125.7 inhabitants per square mile (48.5/km^{2}). There were 65 housing units at an average density of 72.3 per square mile (27.9/km^{2}). The racial makeup of the city was 99.1% White, 0.0% Black or African American, 0.0% Native American, 0.0% Asian, 0.0% Pacific Islander, 0.0% from other races and 0.9% from two or more races. Hispanic or Latino persons of any race comprised 0.0% of the population.

Of the 54 households, 22.2% of which had children under the age of 18 living with them, 40.7% were married couples living together, 7.4% were cohabitating couples, 25.9% had a female householder with no spouse or partner present and 25.9% had a male householder with no spouse or partner present. 38.9% of all households were non-families. 31.5% of all households were made up of individuals, 16.7% had someone living alone who was 65 years old or older.

The median age in the city was 48.5 years. 20.4% of the residents were under the age of 20; 4.4% were between the ages of 20 and 24; 21.2% were from 25 and 44; 27.4% were from 45 and 64; and 26.5% were 65 years of age or older. The gender makeup of the city was 48.7% male and 51.3% female.

=== 2010 census ===
As of the census of 2010, there were 126 people, 63 households, and 37 families residing in the city. The population density was 140.0 inhabitants per square mile (54.1/km^{2}). There were 66 housing units at an average density of 73.3 per square mile (28.3/km^{2}). The racial makeup of the city was 99.2% White and 0.8% from two or more races.

There were 63 households, of which 15.9% had children under the age of 18 living with them, 47.6% were married couples living together, 6.3% had a female householder with no husband present, 4.8% had a male householder with no wife present, and 41.3% were non-families. 28.6% of all households were made up of individuals, and 15.8% had someone living alone who was 65 years of age or older. The average household size was 2.00 and the average family size was 2.43.

The median age in the city was 49 years. 14.3% of residents were under the age of 18; 10.4% were between the ages of 18 and 24; 20.6% were from 25 to 44; 34.9% were from 45 to 64; and 19.8% were 65 years of age or older. The gender makeup of the city was 50.0% male and 50.0% female.

=== 2000 census ===
As of the census of 2000, there were 145 people, 64 households, and 40 families residing in the city. The population density was 161.3 inhabitants per square mile (62.3/km^{2}). There were 69 housing units at an average density of 76.7 per square mile (29.6/km^{2}). The racial makeup of the city was 97.24% White, 0.69% Native American, and 2.07% from two or more races.

There were 64 households, out of which 29.7% had children under the age of 18 living with them, 53.1% were married couples living together, 6.3% had a female householder with no husband present, and 37.5% were non-families. 34.4% of all households were made up of individuals, and 14.1% had someone living alone who was 65 years of age or older. The average household size was 2.27 and the average family size was 2.93.

In the city, the population was spread out, with 24.8% under the age of 18, 6.2% from 18 to 24, 23.4% from 25 to 44, 28.3% from 45 to 64, and 17.2% who were 65 years of age or older. The median age was 42 years. For every 100 females, there were 116.4 males. For every 100 females age 18 and over, there were 98.2 males.

The median income for a household in the city was $30,556, and the median income for a family was $32,321. Males had a median income of $24,375 versus $15,500 for females. The per capita income for the city was $13,432. There were none of the families and 2.7% of the population living below the poverty line, including no under eighteens and 9.1% of those over 64.

== Education ==
The Humboldt Community School District operates public schools. The city is served by Mease Elementary (Dakota City), Taft Elementary School (Humboldt), Humboldt Middle School, and Humboldt High School.

== Notable person ==
- Doreen Wilber, archery gold medalist at the 1972 Summer Olympics.
