= Renwick, Iowa =

- City
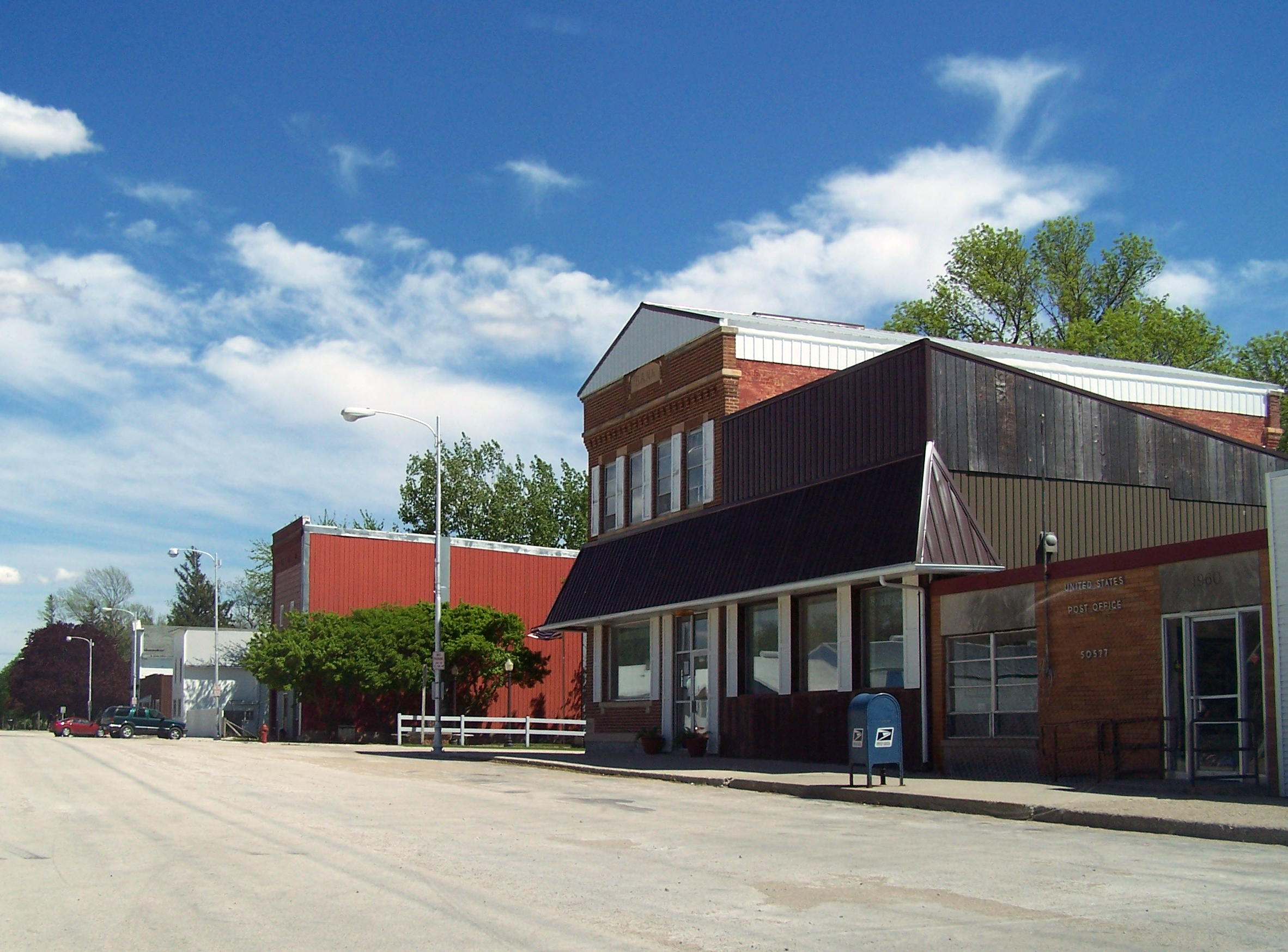
- Streetside in Renwick
- Motto: There's only one Renwick, and it's in Iowa
- Location of Renwick, Iowa
- Coordinates: 42°49′37″N 93°58′53″W
- Country: United States
- State: Iowa
- County: Humboldt
- Incorporated: October 17, 1891

Area
  - Total: 1.00 sq mi (2.60 km^{2})
  - Land: 1.00 sq mi (2.60 km^{2})
  - Water: 0 sq mi (0.00 km^{2})
- Elevation: 1,158 ft (353 m)

Population (2020)
  - Total: 234
  - Density: 233.4/sq mi (90.13/km^{2})
- Time zone: UTC-6 (Central (CST))
  - Summer (DST): UTC-5 (CDT)
- ZIP code: 50577
- Area code: 515
- FIPS code: 19-66450
- GNIS feature ID: 2396351

Renwick is a city in Humboldt County, Iowa, United States. The population was 234 at the time of the 2020 census.

== History ==
Renwick was platted in 1882.

In 1970 the population was 480. By 1987, this was down to 350. By then, there was no longer a bank branch that provided all services for customers, nor was there a hardware store. Bob Secter of the Los Angeles Times stated that year that Renwick was "already a shadow of what it was a decade ago."

== Geography ==
According to the United States Census Bureau, the city has a total area of 1.00 square mile (2.59 km^{2}), all land.

Renwick's population density is estimated at 261 people per square mile, which is considered very low for urban areas.

== Demographics ==
Historical populations
Year	Pop.	±%
1900	350	—
1910	372	+6.3%
1920	501	+34.7%
1930	491	−2.0%
1940	470	−4.3%
1950	474	+0.9%
1960	477	+0.6%
1970	429	−10.1%
1980	410	−4.4%
1990	287	−30.0%
2000	306	+6.6%
2010	242	−20.9%
2020	234	−3.3%
Sources: Source: U.S. Decennial Census

=== 2020 census ===
As of the census of 2020, there were 234 people, 121 households, and 62 families residing in the city. The population density was 233.4 inhabitants per square mile (90.1/km^{2}). There were 140 housing units at an average density of 139.7 per square mile (53.9/km^{2}). The racial makeup of the city was 82.9% White, 0.9% Black or African American, 0.0% Native American, 0.0% Asian, 0.0% Pacific Islander, 3.8% from other races and 12.4% from two or more races. Hispanic or Latino persons of any race comprised 3.0% of the population.

Of the 121 households, 17.4% of which had children under the age of 18 living with them, 40.5% were married couples living together, 5.8% were cohabitating couples, 20.7% had a female householder with no spouse or partner present and 33.1% had a male householder with no spouse or partner present. 48.8% of all households were non-families. 44.6% of all households were made up of individuals, 21.5% had someone living alone who was 65 years old or older.

The median age in the city was 50.5 years. 17.1% of the residents were under the age of 20; 6.8% were between the ages of 20 and 24; 18.8% were from 25 and 44; 34.2% were from 45 and 64; and 23.1% were 65 years of age or older. The gender makeup of the city was 52.6% male and 47.4% female.

=== 2010 census ===
As of the census of 2010, there were 242 people, 119 households, and 70 families residing in the city. The population density was 242.0 inhabitants per square mile (93.4/km^{2}). There were 141 housing units at an average density of 141.0 per square mile (54.4/km^{2}). The racial makeup of the city was 97.9% White, 0.4% African American, 0.4% Asian, 0.4% from other races, and 0.8% from two or more races. Hispanic or Latino of any race were 1.2% of the population.

There were 119 households, of which 23.5% had children under the age of 18 living with them, 49.6% were married couples living together, 3.4% had a female householder with no husband present, 5.9% had a male householder with no wife present, and 41.2% were non-families. 37.0% of all households were made up of individuals, and 13.5% had someone living alone who was 65 years of age or older. The average household size was 2.03 and the average family size was 2.63.

The median age in the city was 46.1 years. 19.8% of residents were under the age of 18; 5.8% were between the ages of 18 and 24; 21.5% were from 25 to 44; 31.9% were from 45 to 64; and 21.1% were 65 years of age or older. The gender makeup of the city was 50.4% male and 49.6% female.

=== 2000 census ===
As of the census of 2000, there were 306 people, 135 households, and 76 families residing in the city. The population density was 308.4 inhabitants per square mile (119.1/km^{2}). There were 150 housing units at an average density of 151.2 per square mile (58.4/km^{2}). The racial makeup of the city was 99.35% White, 0.33% Asian, and 0.33% from two or more races. Hispanic or Latino of any race were 0.33% of the population.

There were 135 households, out of which 29.6% had children under the age of 18 living with them, 53.3% were married couples living together, 2.2% had a female householder with no husband present, and 43.0% were non-families. 37.0% of all households were made up of individuals, and 18.5% had someone living alone who was 65 years of age or older. The average household size was 2.27 and the average family size was 3.04.

In the city, the population was spread out, with 23.9% under the age of 18, 7.8% from 18 to 24, 28.4% from 25 to 44, 19.9% from 45 to 64, and 19.9% who were 65 years of age or older. The median age was 40 years. For every 100 females, there were 102.6 males. For every 100 females age 18 and over, there were 92.6 males.

The median income for a household in the city was $33,333, and the median income for a family was $38,750. Males had a median income of $27,344 versus $18,333 for females. The per capita income for the city was $18,609. About 5.8% of families and 7.5% of the population were below the poverty line, including 10.3% of those under the age of eighteen and 10.2% of those 65 or over.

== Education ==
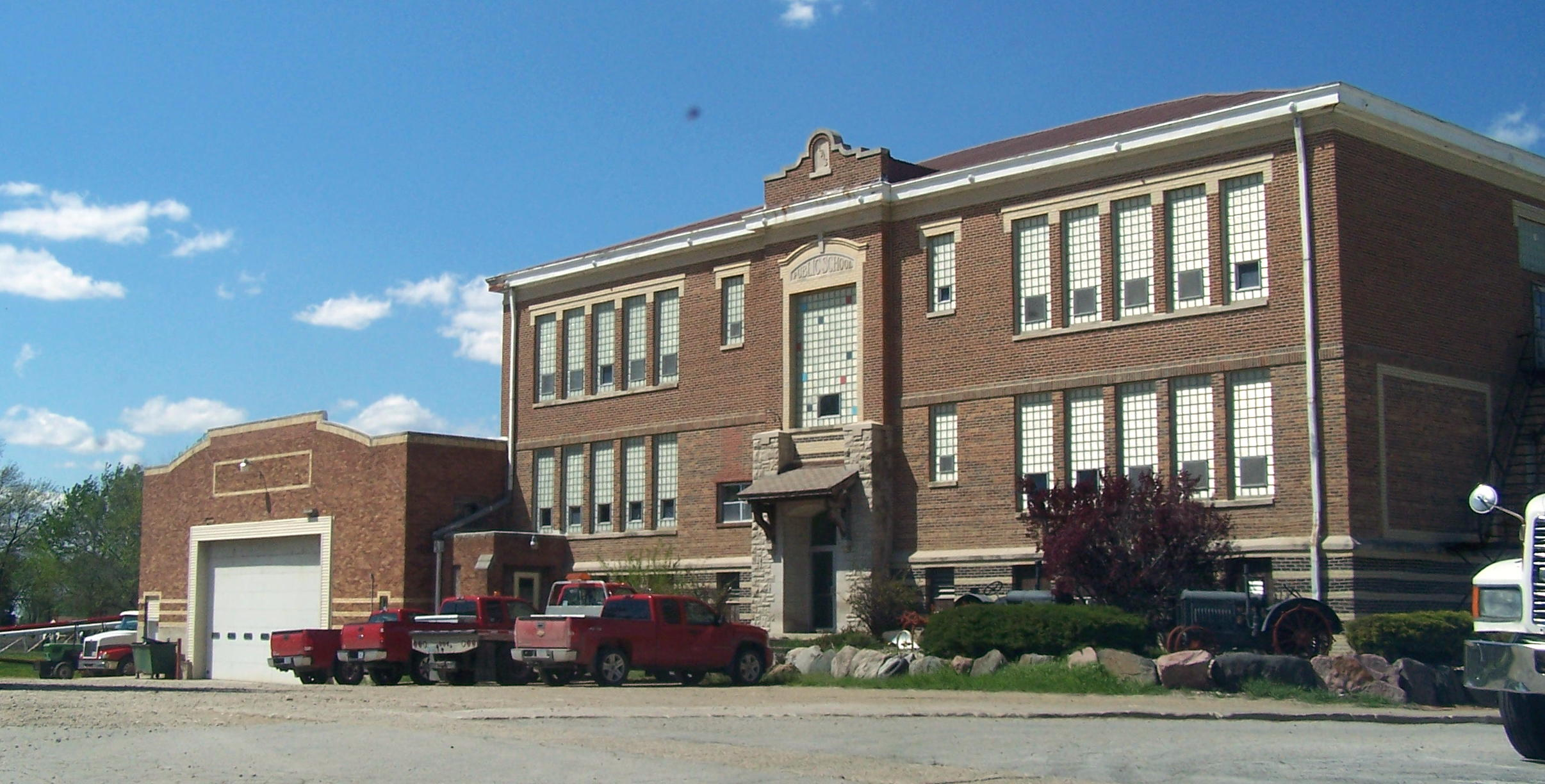
The old Renwick Public School building, which was used by the Boone Valley Community School District.

The Humboldt Community School District operates public schools. The city is served by Mease Elementary (Dakota City), Taft Elementary School (Humboldt), Humboldt Middle School, and Humboldt High School.

Previously Renwick was served by the Boone Valley Community School District, which operated the Boone Valley School, built in 1915, in Renwick. On January 1, 1988, the Boone Valley district dissolved, with a portion absorbed by other school districts. That year the Boone Valley School closed, and in 1989 alumnus Frank Siemens and his family bought it for $5,000. The business Boone Valley Implement is in the former school. By 2015 Siemens spent $500,000 to refurbish the building. In 2015 Jason Clayworth and Charles Litchfield of the Des Moines Register stated "A large portion of the older section of the school remains relatively unused."

Renwick Public Library has in its collection 5,351 books, 131 audio materials, 532 video materials, and 23 serial subscriptions.

== Arts and culture ==
Annual festivals

Donkey Daze is Renwick's town festival held every year during the first Saturday in June and features a six court volleyball tournament. As many as 25 teams from around North Central Iowa have participated in past years.

== Transportation ==
Renwick has a privately owned airport licensed in 1991 called the Flying S Ranch Airport. The airport is located approximately 2 miles (3.2 km) from the center of town.
