= Humboldt County Courthouse (Iowa) =

- U.S. National Register of Historic Places
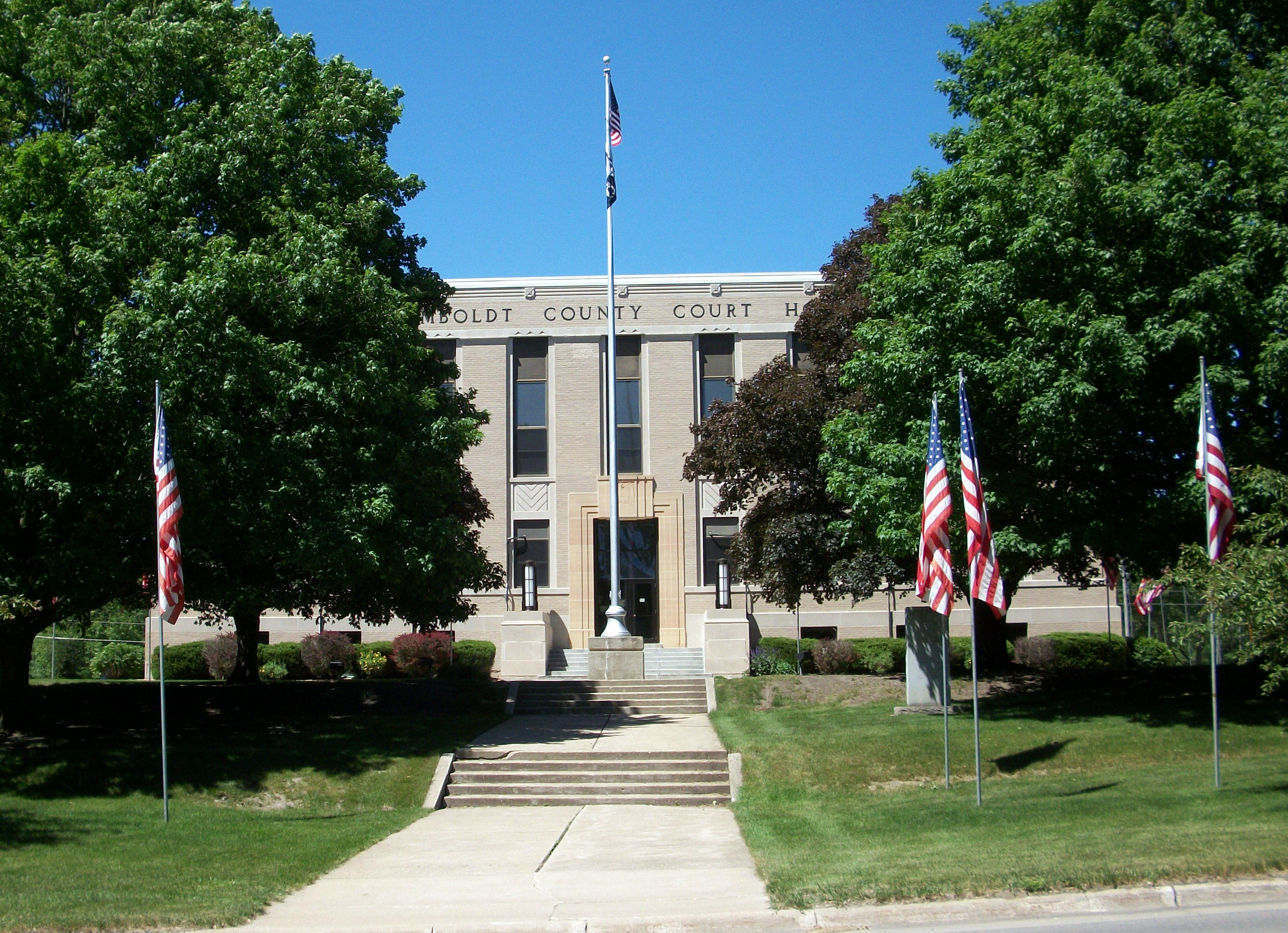

- Location within Iowa Location within the United States
- Location: 203 Main St. Dakota City, Iowa
- Coordinates: 42°43′21″N 94°12′58″W
- Area: 4.9 acres (2.0 ha)
- Built: 1939
- Architect: Dougher, Rich and Woodburn
- Architectural style: PWA Moderne/Art Deco
- MPS: PWA-Era County Courthouses of IA
- NRHP reference No.: 03000823
- Added to NRHP: August 28, 2003

The Humboldt County Courthouse is located in Dakota City, Iowa, United States, and dates from 1939. It was listed on the National Register of Historic Places in 2003 as a part of the PWA-Era County Courthouses of IA Multiple Properties Submission. The courthouse is the second building the county has used for court functions and county administration.

== History ==
Dakota City was established as the county seat in 1857, but a courthouse was not built until 1873. The two-story building was constructed for $5,000. Plans to build a new courthouse were defeated in 1923 when voters suspected plans to move the county seat to neighboring Humboldt.

Plans for the current courthouse were approved in 1936. The Des Moines architectural firm of Dougher, Rich & Woodburn were retained to design the building. The county applied to the Public Works Administration, or PWA, to assist with the funding. The grant was approved in 1937. The contract to build the building was given to Holtze Construction Co. of Sioux City, Iowa. The cornerstone was laid on April 30, 1938, and the new building was dedicated on February 25, 1939. The courthouse was built for $185,000. Iowa Supreme Court Justice Richard Mitchell delivered the main address at an open house.

== Architecture ==
The courthouse is a rectangular structure that measures 105 by 66 feet (32 by 20 m). The architectural style of the building is known as Depression Modern or PWA Moderne. The building features a symmetrical façade. Two lower sections were designed to flank the main block, but were never built. The exterior is composed of buff-colored brick and Bedford limestone trim. It is three stories tall and built on a raised basement. On the interior, the central corridors extend the length of the building, with the county offices opening onto the corridors. The building features multi-colored terrazzo floors, marble wainscoting and acoustic tiles. The courtroom was originally decorated in dark wood tones and Art Deco ornamentation. The third floor contained the county jail cell and three-bedroom apartment the county sheriff lived in, as well as a custodian's apartment, until remodeled in 1982.

The building is located on the courthouse square immediately west of the central business district and just to the east of Humboldt. The previous courthouse was also located here. The square itself is a contributing site on the courthouse's nomination to the National Register of Historic Places, and the original flagpole in front of the building is a contributing object.

== See also ==
- Humboldt County, Iowa
- List of Iowa county courthouses
