= Humboldt High School (Iowa) =

Public secondary school in Humboldt, Iowa, United States

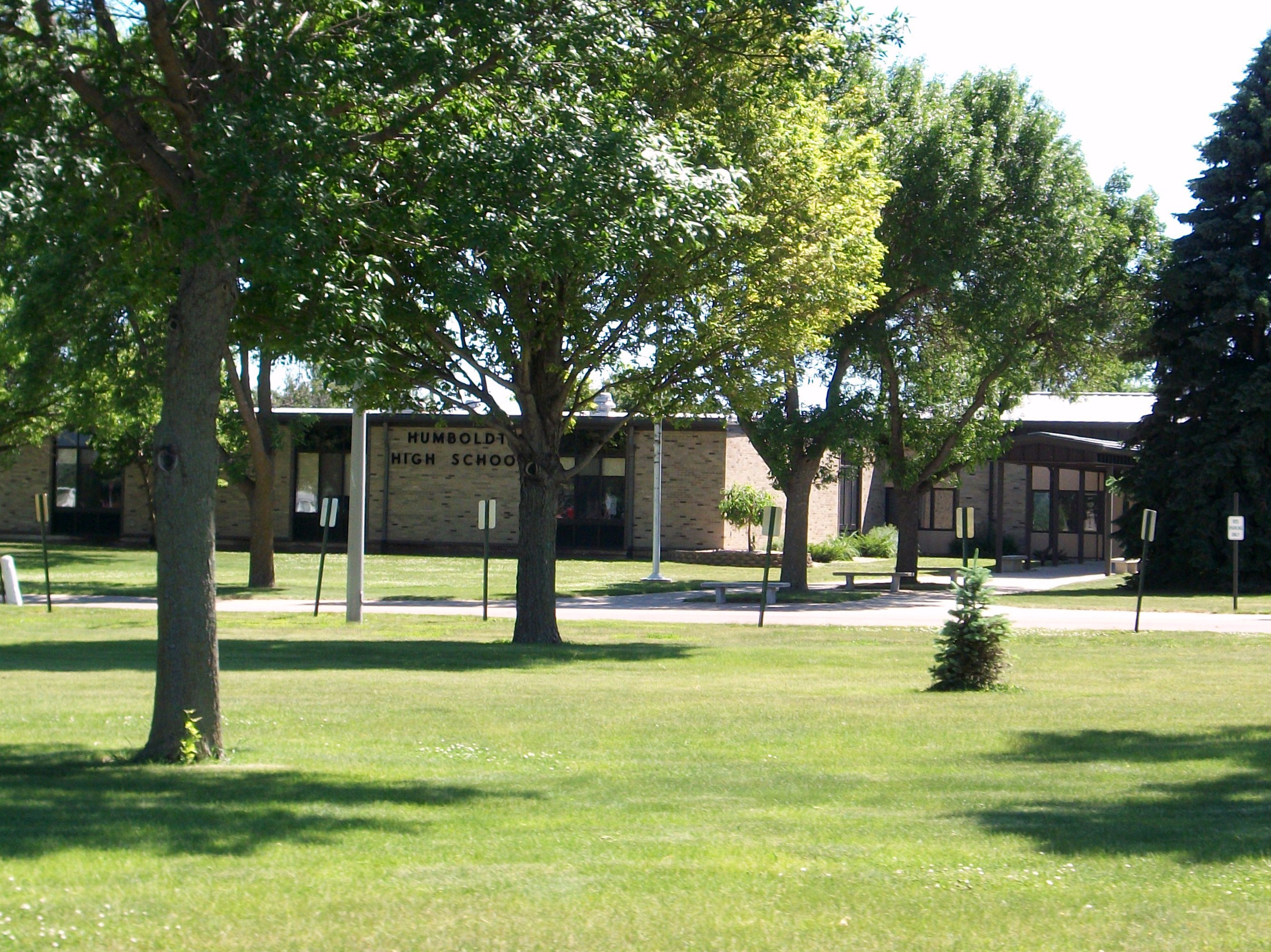

Location
- 1500 Wildcat Rd. Humboldt, Iowa 50548; United States; 42°42′58″N 94°13′48″W

Information
- Type: Public High School
- Motto: Learning and Successful for All
- Established: 1967
- School district: Humboldt Community School District
- Principal: Lori Westhoff
- Faculty: 29.95 (FTE)
- Grades: 9-12
- Student to teacher ratio: 15.49
- Campus: Rural
- Colors: Royal Blue & Gold
- Athletics conference: North Central Conference
- Mascot: Victor E
- Nickname: Wildcats
- Website: District Website

Humboldt High School is a public, co-educational high school in Humboldt, Iowa. It is a part of Humboldt Community School District, and serves grades nine through twelve.As the sole high school in its district, it serves Humboldt, Dakota City, Hardy, Renwick, and Rutland.

== History ==
In 1987, the Boone Valley Community School District began sending middle and high school students to Humboldt as part of a grade sharing agreement. The Boone Valley district would then dissolve on July 1, 1988, with a portion absorbed by Humboldt.

The school was founded by local citizens in 1863.

== Academics ==
Humboldt High School has about a 17:1 student / teacher ratio. There are about 389 students enrolled in Humboldt High.

== Activities ==
Humboldt High School offers many opportunities through athletic and co-curricular activities.

=== Athletic ===
The Wildcats compete in the North Central Conference. Humboldt High offers many athletics a student can be involved in. Some include volleyball, football, girls and boys cross country, girls and boys basketball, wrestling, girls and boys track & field, soccer, girls and boys golf, baseball, and softball .

==== State championships ====
- Humboldt Football was 12-1 in 2006, and won a Class 3A State Championship.
- Boys' Cross Country - 1994 Class 2A State Champions
- Wrestling - 1968 Class A State Champions
- Boys' Track and Field - 1995 Class 3A State Champions
- Girls' Golf - 3-time State Champions (1985, 1987, 2017)

=== Co-curricular ===
Humboldt High also offers many co-curricular activities to their students. Some of these are vocal and instrumental music, musicals, KMO, Quiz Bowl, JETS, Science Bowl, and FFA.

== Notable alumni ==
- Bruce Reimers, an offensive lineman for the Cincinnati Bengals and Tampa Bay Buccaneers from 1984–1993.
- Frank Gotch, a wrestler who went 154-6 in his wrestling career, winning the world heavyweight championship in 1908.
- Frank Gotch (MD), American physician who derived the mathematical expressions Kt/V and standardized Kt/V used internationally to quantify and prescribe dialysis therapy for kidney failure.
- Jon Porter, former member of the United States House of Representatives in Nevada.
- Kevin Dresser, Head coach of wrestling at Iowa State University.

== Notable faculty ==
- Dick Schultz, baseball and basketball coach at Humboldt High School and later the University of Iowa

== See also ==
- List of high schools in Iowa
