= Hardy, Iowa =

- City
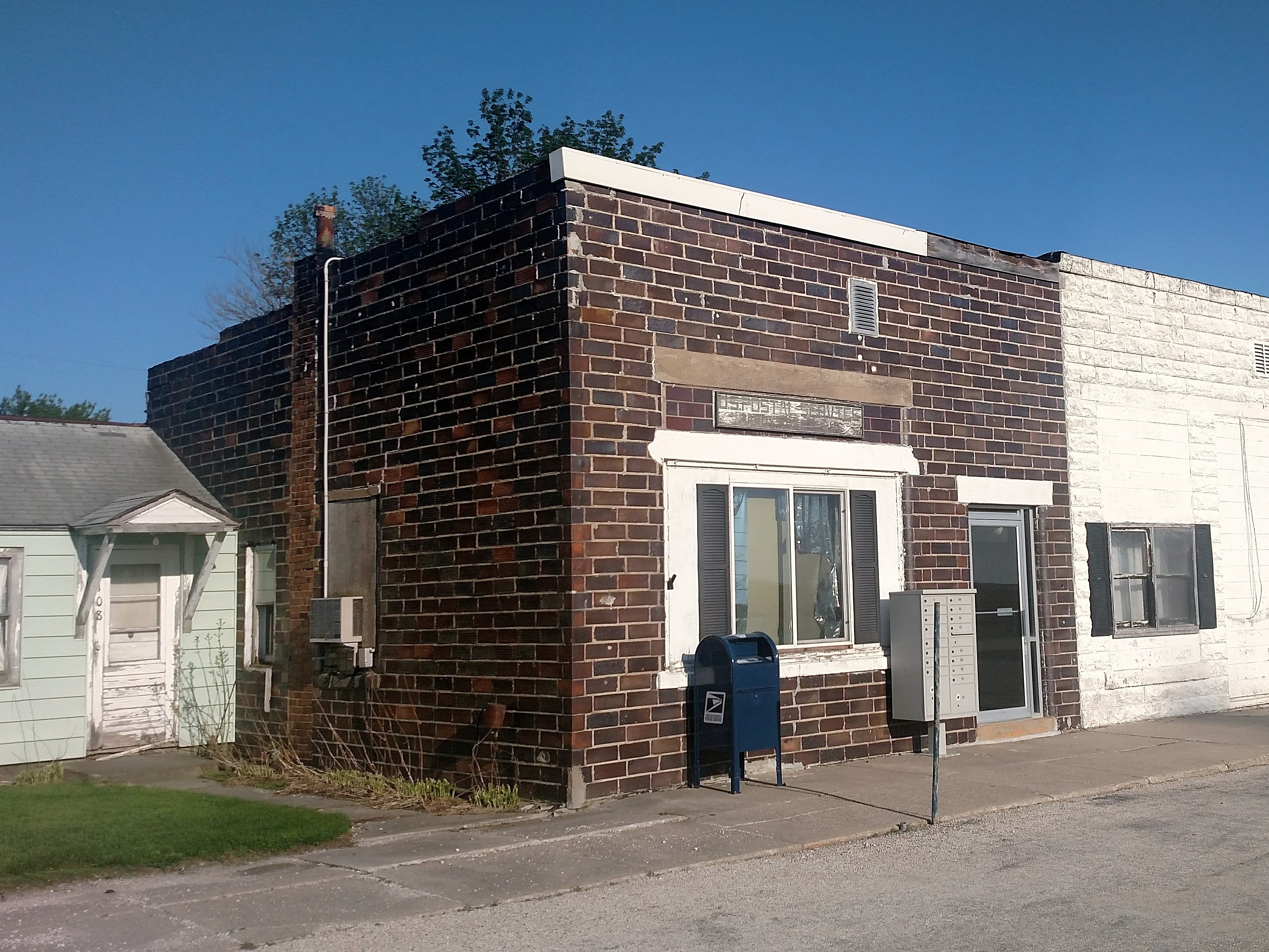
- Post office in downtown Hardy, Iowa

- Location of Hardy, Iowa
- Coordinates: 42°48′37″N 94°03′04″W
- Country: USA
- State: Iowa
- County: Humboldt

Area
  - Total: 0.45 sq mi (1.17 km^{2})
  - Land: 0.45 sq mi (1.17 km^{2})
  - Water: 0 sq mi (0.00 km^{2})
- Elevation: 1,135 ft (346 m)

Population (2020)
  - Total: 57
  - Density: 126.7/sq mi (48.92/km^{2})
- Time zone: UTC-6 (Central (CST))
  - Summer (DST): UTC-5 (CDT)
- ZIP code: 50545
- Area code: 515
- FIPS code: 19-34455
- GNIS feature ID: 2394298
- Website: https://cityofhardy.godaddysites.com/

Hardy is a city in Humboldt County, Iowa, United States. The population was 57 at the time of the 2020 census.

== History ==
Hardy got its start in the year 1881, following construction of the Cedar Rapids, Iowa Falls and Northwestern Railway through that territory.

== Geography ==
According to the United States Census Bureau, the city has a total area of 0.44 square miles (1.14 km^{2}), all land.

== Demographics ==
Historical populations
| Year | Pop. | ±% |
|---|---|---|
| 1920 | 128 | — |
| 1930 | 147 | +14.8% |
| 1940 | 168 | +14.3% |
| 1950 | 139 | −17.3% |
| 1960 | 110 | −20.9% |
| 1970 | 73 | −33.6% |
| 1980 | 72 | −1.4% |
| 1990 | 47 | −34.7% |
| 2000 | 57 | +21.3% |
| 2010 | 47 | −17.5% |
| 2020 | 57 | +21.3% |
Sources: Source: U.S. Decennial Census

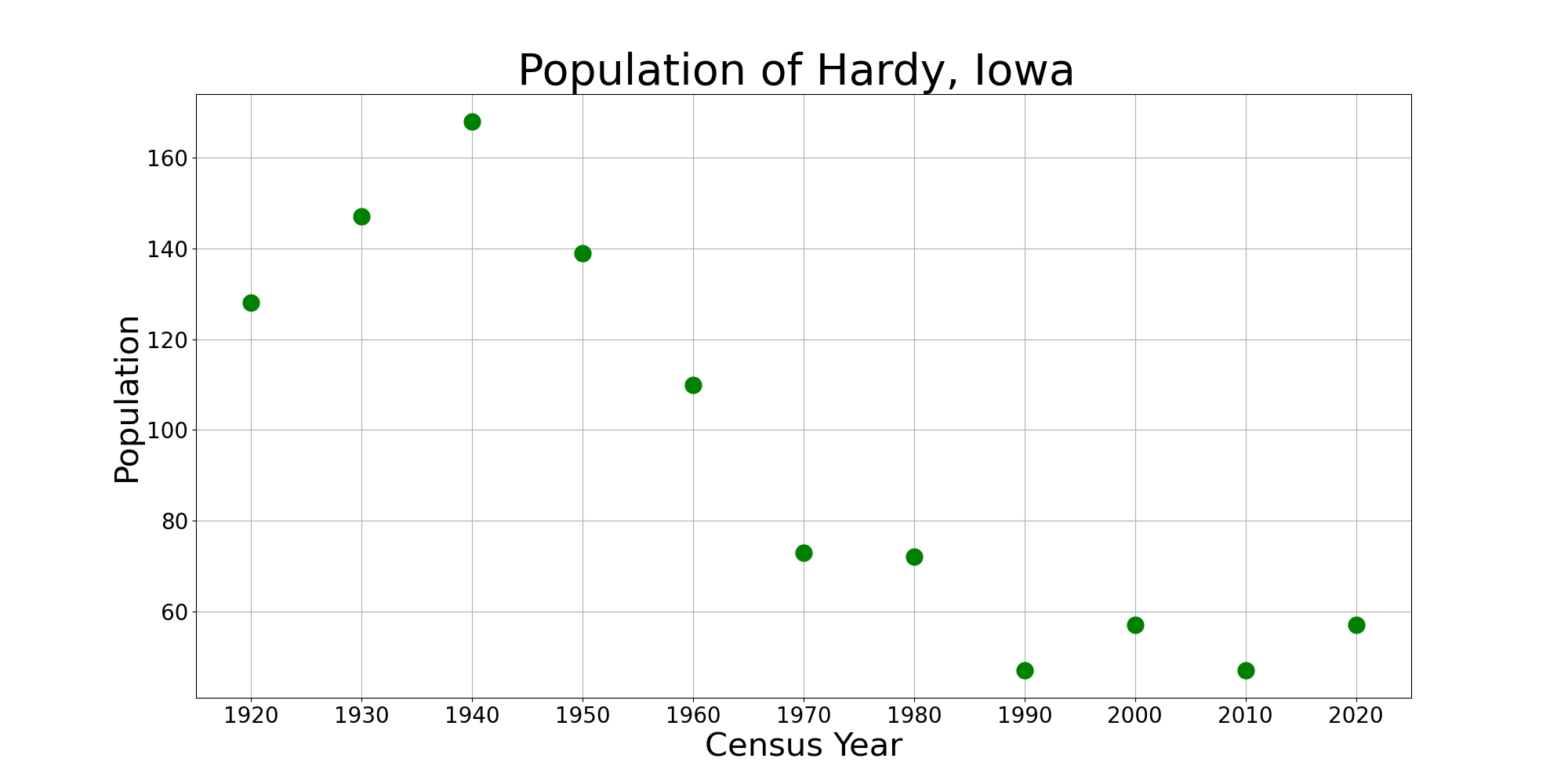
The population of Hardy, Iowa from US census data

=== 2020 census ===
As of the census of 2020, there were 57 people, 21 households, and 17 families residing in the city. The population density was 126.7 inhabitants per square mile (48.9/km^{2}). There were 25 housing units at an average density of 55.6 per square mile (21.5/km^{2}). The racial makeup of the city was 91.2% White, 1.8% Black or African American, 0.0% Native American, 0.0% Asian, 0.0% Pacific Islander, 0.0% from other races and 7.0% from two or more races. Hispanic or Latino persons of any race comprised 3.5% of the population.

Of the 21 households, 47.6% of which had children under the age of 18 living with them, 47.6% were married couples living together, 9.5% were cohabitating couples, 19.0% had a female householder with no spouse or partner present and 23.8% had a male householder with no spouse or partner present. 19.0% of all households were non-families. 14.3% of all households were made up of individuals, 4.8% had someone living alone who was 65 years old or older.

The median age in the city was 32.8 years. 35.1% of the residents were under the age of 20; 3.5% were between the ages of 20 and 24; 19.3% were from 25 and 44; 31.6% were from 45 and 64; and 10.5% were 65 years of age or older. The gender makeup of the city was 49.1% male and 50.9% female.

=== 2010 census ===
As of the census of 2010, there were 47 people, 19 households, and 11 families living in the city. The population density was 106.8 inhabitants per square mile (41.2/km^{2}). There were 26 housing units at an average density of 59.1 per square mile (22.8/km^{2}). The racial makeup of the city was 93.6% White and 6.4% from two or more races.

There were 19 households, of which 26.3% had children under the age of 18 living with them, 47.4% were married couples living together, 5.3% had a female householder with no husband present, 5.3% had a male householder with no wife present, and 42.1% were non-families. 36.8% of all households were made up of individuals, and 10.5% had someone living alone who was 65 years of age or older. The average household size was 2.47 and the average family size was 3.36.

The median age in the city was 45.3 years. 34% of residents were under the age of 18; 2.2% were between the ages of 18 and 24; 12.8% were from 25 to 44; 36.1% were from 45 to 64; and 14.9% were 65 years of age or older. The gender makeup of the city was 48.9% male and 51.1% female.

=== 2000 census ===
As of the census of 2000, there were 57 people, 25 households, and 20 families living in the city. The population density was 128.9 inhabitants per square mile (49.8/km^{2}). There were 30 housing units at an average density of 67.9 per square mile (26.2/km^{2}). The racial makeup of the city was 96.49% White, and 3.51% from two or more races.

There were 25 households, out of which 36.0% had children under the age of 18 living with them, 52.0% were married couples living together, 16.0% had a female householder with no husband present, and 20.0% were non-families. 16.0% of all households were made up of individuals, and 8.0% had someone living alone who was 65 years of age or older. The average household size was 2.28 and the average family size was 2.35.

In the city, the population was spread out, with 21.1% under the age of 18, 7.0% from 18 to 24, 35.1% from 25 to 44, 17.5% from 45 to 64, and 19.3% who were 65 years of age or older. The median age was 40 years. For every 100 females, there were 90.0 males. For every 100 females age 18 and over, there were 95.7 males.

The median income for a household in the city was $28,929, and the median income for a family was $26,250. Males had a median income of $28,750 versus $16,875 for females. The per capita income for the city was $12,910. There were 5.6% of families and 15.4% of the population living below the poverty line, including 22.2% of under eighteens and none of those over 64.

== Education ==
The Humboldt Community School District operates public schools. The city is served by Mease Elementary (Dakota City), Taft Elementary School (Humboldt), Humboldt Middle School, and Humboldt High School.
