= Dakota City =

Dakota City may refer to several places:

== Places ==
- Dakota City, Iowa
- Dakota City, Nebraska

== Fiction ==
- Dakota City (comics), the main fictional setting of Milestone Media's comics universe
