= Dick Schultz =

American sports coach and administrator (born 1929)

Biographical details
- Born: September 5, 1929 (age 97)

Playing career

Football
- c. 1950: Central (IA)

Basketball
- c. 1950: Central (IA)

Baseball
- c. 1950: Central (IA)

Coaching career (HC unless noted)

Basketball
- 1960–1970: Iowa (assistant)
- 1970–1974: Iowa

Baseball
- 1961–1962: Iowa (assistant)
- 1963–1970: Iowa

Administrative career (AD unless noted)
- 1976–1981: Cornell
- 1981–1987: Virginia
- 1988–1993: NCAA (president)
- 1995–2000: USOC (executive director)

Head coaching record
- Overall: 41–55 (college basketball); 129–106 (college baseball)

Dick Schultz (born September 5, 1929) is an American retired sports coach and administrator. He served as the head baseball coach at the University of Iowa from 1963 to 1970 and as the school's head men's basketball coach from 1970 to 1974. Schultz was the athletic director at Cornell University from 1976 to 1981 and the University of Virginia from 1981 to 1987. He was as the executive director of the National Collegiate Athletic Association (NCAA) from 1988 to 1993 and the United States Olympic Committee (USOC) from 1995 to 2000.

== Biography ==
Schultz is a native of Kellogg, Iowa. After graduation from Central College in Pella, Iowa, in 1950, Schultz began his coaching career at Humboldt High School in Humboldt, Iowa. He turned down a chance to play baseball for the St. Louis Browns organization in order to teach and coach. Over a ten-year period, Schultz taught biology and served as an assistant football, and head baseball and basketball coach.

=== Coaching career ===
In 1960, Schultz was hired as an assistant baseball and men's basketball coach at the University of Iowa. Schultz had a 129–106 record in 7 1/2 seasons as baseball coach. In 1970, when Ralph Miller abruptly left the Iowa basketball program for Oregon State, Schultz was made the men's head basketball coach. Schultz had a 41–55 mark in four seasons as Iowa's basketball coach before being replaced by Lute Olson.

=== Athletic director ===
From 1976 to 1981, Schultz was athletic director at Cornell University, where he hired a new football coach (Bob Blackman) and worked toward financial self-sufficiency for his department. Schultz became the athletic director at the University of Virginia in 1981 and held that position until 1987.

=== NCAA executive director ===
In 1987, he succeeded Walter Byers to become the second executive director of the National Collegiate Athletic Association (NCAA). During his five-year tenure, he helped to strengthened the organization's integrity and reform by opening lines of communication with member colleges. In 1993, irregularities were discovered at the University of Virginia, some that occurred when he served as athletic director. Although cleared of all charges and receiving a vote of confidence from the membership board, Schultz thought it was appropriate to resign.

=== USOC executive director ===
In 1995, he accepted the position as executive director of the United States Olympic Committee (USOC), where he served until 2000.

== Personal life ==
In 2003, he became the 174th inductee into the Des Moines Sunday Register's Iowa Sports Hall of Fame. Schultz lives in Colorado Springs, Colorado.

== Head coaching record ==
=== College basketball ===
Record table
Season	Team	Overall	Conference	Standing	Postseason
Iowa Hawkeyes (Big Ten Conference) (1970–1974)
1970–71	Iowa	9–15	4–10	T–7th	
1971–72	Iowa	11–13	5–9	T–8th	
1972–73	Iowa	13–11	6–8	T–6th	
1973–74	Iowa	8–16	5–9	7th	
Iowa:		41–55	20–36		
Total:		41–55			
