= Humboldt College =

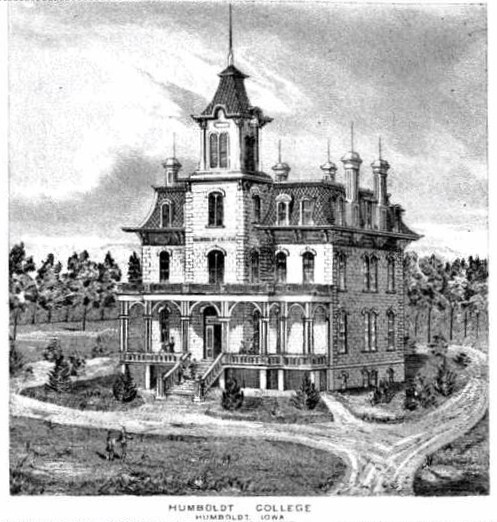
- Humboldt College sits atop Bedford Avenue c. 1895
- Type: 9–12 followed by collegiate work
- Active: 1872–1916
- President: Stephen H. Taft
- Location: Humboldt, Iowa, United States; 42°44′02″N 94°13′14″W
- Campus: Rural

Humboldt College was an institution of higher learning in Humboldt, Iowa, United States. From 1872 until it closed in 1916, only three people ever obtained degrees from Humboldt College.

== History ==
=== Creating the "Harvard of the West" ===
Stephen Taft moved from New York to the prairie of Iowa in 1862, with hopes of founding an intellectual community that would rival the Eastern cities. He had five goals for his city, but the most important goal was founding a college "of university importance" that would not dissent into "factional disputes or denominational barriers". The Springvale Collegiate Association met for the first time in 1866, and upon renaming of the community to Humboldt, the group would meet again in 1869. Despite the excitement in the town for a college, the voters of Humboldt denied Taft the funds to purchase swampland on the city's northern boundary.

Not defeated, Taft looked East for financial backing, but funds were still scarce. Taft almost missed a deadline that would have caused an automatic default on his loan, but was wired the money with half an hour to spare. Eventually, Taft raised the necessary funds to buy the swamp, and the groundbreaking ceremony was held on June 17, 1870. Taft ended his convocation to the attendees by saying "Hundreds are here present today. Tens of thousands shall gather here a hundred years hence to commemorate the birth of the institution and rejoice in the blessings it shall have conferred."

=== Opening ===
The first day of class at Humboldt College was September 13, 1872. As was the case with most period colleges, the first three years of education were material covered in today's high schools, since the public education ended at eighth grade. The first (and final) graduating class would come in 1879 and consist of three people. Taft had failed to make an endowment fund large enough to ensure permanency, and following financial crises in the East, the college would close in 1916.

=== Closing ===
The building was put up for rent, but with the Great Depression approaching, tenants could not be found. The college was razed in 1926. The academics were moved to Minneapolis, Minnesota, where it operated as the Humboldt Institute until the mid-seventies.

== Humboldt now ==
Without the college to attract intellectuals, Humboldt fell short of Taft's lofty expectations. There is only one remaining building from the college, and it is privately owned.
