= Bruce Reimers =

American football player (born 1960)

No. 75, 66
- Position: Guard

Personal information
- Born: September 28, 1960 (age 66); Algona, Iowa, U.S.
- Listed height: 6 ft 7 in (2.01 m)
- Listed weight: 280 lb (127 kg)

Career information
- High school: Humboldt (Humboldt, Iowa)
- College: Iowa State
- NFL draft: 1984: 8th round, 204th overall pick

Career history
- Cincinnati Bengals (1984–1991); Tampa Bay Buccaneers (1992–1993)

Awards and highlights
- First-team All-Big Eight (1983)

Career NFL statistics
- Games played: 135
- Games started: 91
- Fumble recoveries: 2
- Stats at Pro Football Reference

Bruce Reimers (born September 28, 1960) is an American former professional football player who was a guard for 10 seasons with the Cincinnati Bengals and Tampa Bay Buccaneers of the National Football League (NFL). He played college football for the Iowa State Cyclones.

== Early life ==
From 1975 to 1979 Reimers played at Humboldt High School in Humboldt, Iowa. Weighing 225 pounds, he earned 1st team defense honors and was nominated into the IHSAA Football Hall of Fame.

== College career ==
Reimers played four years at Iowa State University. During his first year of college he was switched from defensive line to offensive line due to injury. While playing offensive guard he put on 45 pounds, going from his high school weight of 225 to 270 at the end of his college career, and now felt he had enough strength and experience to enter the NFL draft. He was selected in the eighth round of the 1984 NFL draft by the Cincinnati Bengals.

== Professional career ==
Reimers was selected in the 1984 NFL draft, and played in 15 games for the Bengals that season. He led them to an average 8–8 season, but fell short of the playoffs. He played mostly offensive guard and occasionally offensive tackle the majority of the games throughout his first three years for the Bengals. In the 1987 season, Reimers was plagued by an ankle injury, only playing in 10 games where the Bengals went 4–11, but bounced back in the 1988 season, in which he played in all 16 games of the regular season and all the way to Super Bowl XXIII, which they lost to the San Francisco 49ers.

Reimers played 15 games in the 1989 season, and suffered a severe ankle injury in 1990. He finished his career with the Bengals in the 1991 season where they went 3–13, and was traded to the Tampa Bay Buccaneers where he played in two more seasons, going 5–11 in each of his last two NFL seasons.
