= Humboldt Community School District =

Public school district in Humboldt, Iowa, United States

Coordinates: 42.721621°N 94.203857°W

Location
- Humboldt, Iowa Humboldt, Webster and Wright counties United States
- Coordinates: 42.721621, -94.203857

District information
- Type: Local school district
- Grades: K-12
- Superintendent: Ryan Fedders
- Schools: 4
- Budget: $21,646,000 (2020-21)
- NCES District ID: 1931680

Students and staff
- Students: 1516 (2022-23)
- Teachers: 98.36 FTE
- Staff: 94.74 FTE
- Student–teacher ratio: 15.41
- Athletic conference: North Central Conference
- District mascot: Wildcats
- Colors: Royal Blue and Gold

Other information
- Website: www.humboldt.k12.ia.us/district

Humboldt Community School District is a rural public school district headquartered in Humboldt, Iowa. It is mostly in Humboldt County, with portions in Webster and Wright counties. It serves Dakota City, Humboldt, Hardy, Renwick, and Rutland.

== History ==
At one time the Humboldt district had an enrollment of 2,000. By 1987 that was down to below 1,300.

In 1987 the Boone Valley Community School District began sending middle and high school students to Humboldt as part of a grade sharing agreement. It also began using Humboldt's administration, which meant Wes Carlson, previously the Boone Valley superintendent and at this point the Humboldt superintendent, began again providing superintendent services to Boone Valley.

On July 1, 1988, the Boone Valley Community School District dissolved, with a portion absorbed by Humboldt.

In July 2011 the district began a whole grade sharing agreement with the Twin Rivers Community School District. In 2015, 37 students living in the Twin Rivers district in grades 6-12 attended the middle-high school operated by Humboldt.

== Schools ==
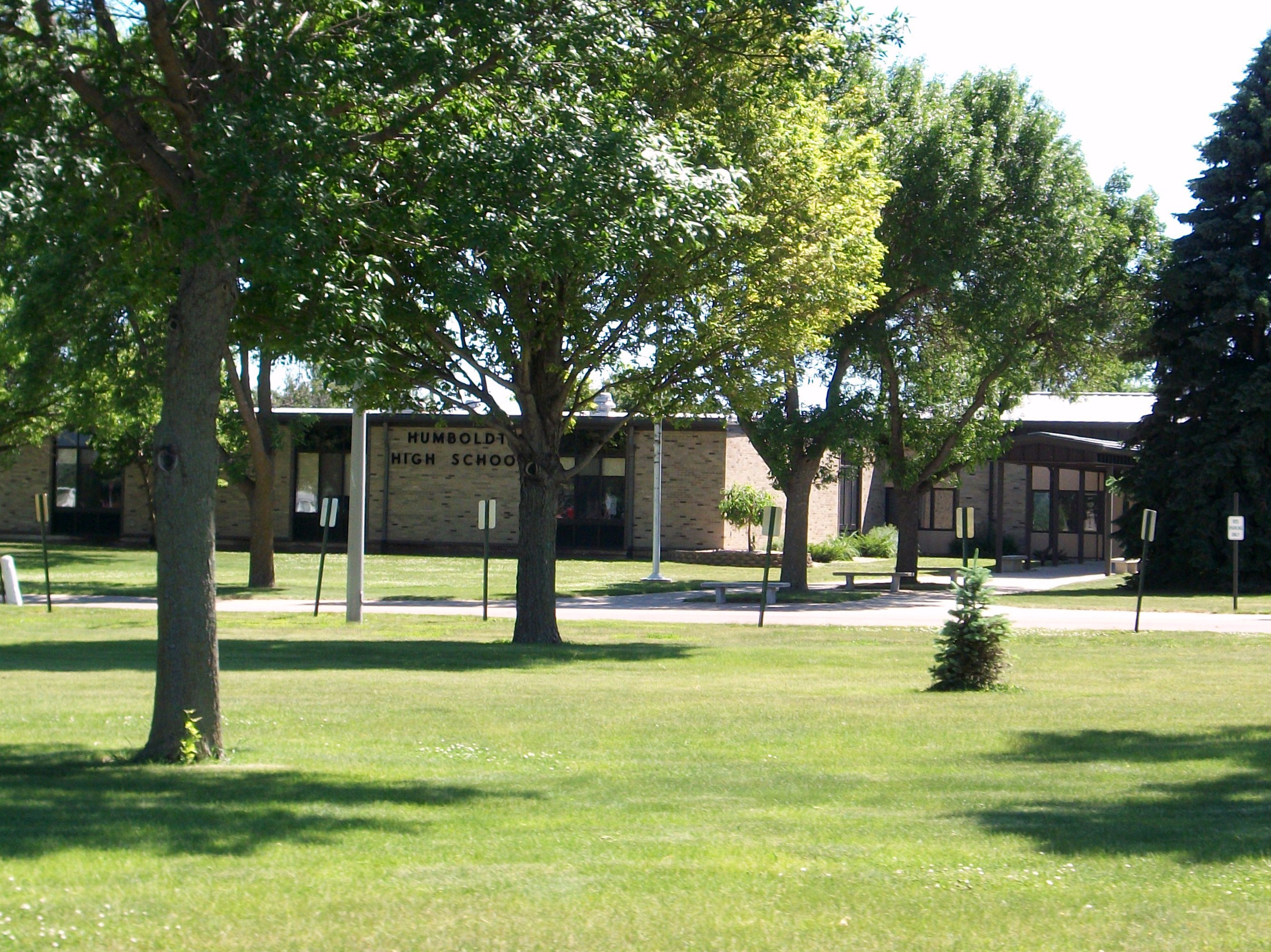
Humboldt High School

- Humboldt High School
- Humboldt Middle School
- Taft Elementary School
- Clyde D. Mease Elementary School (Dakota City)
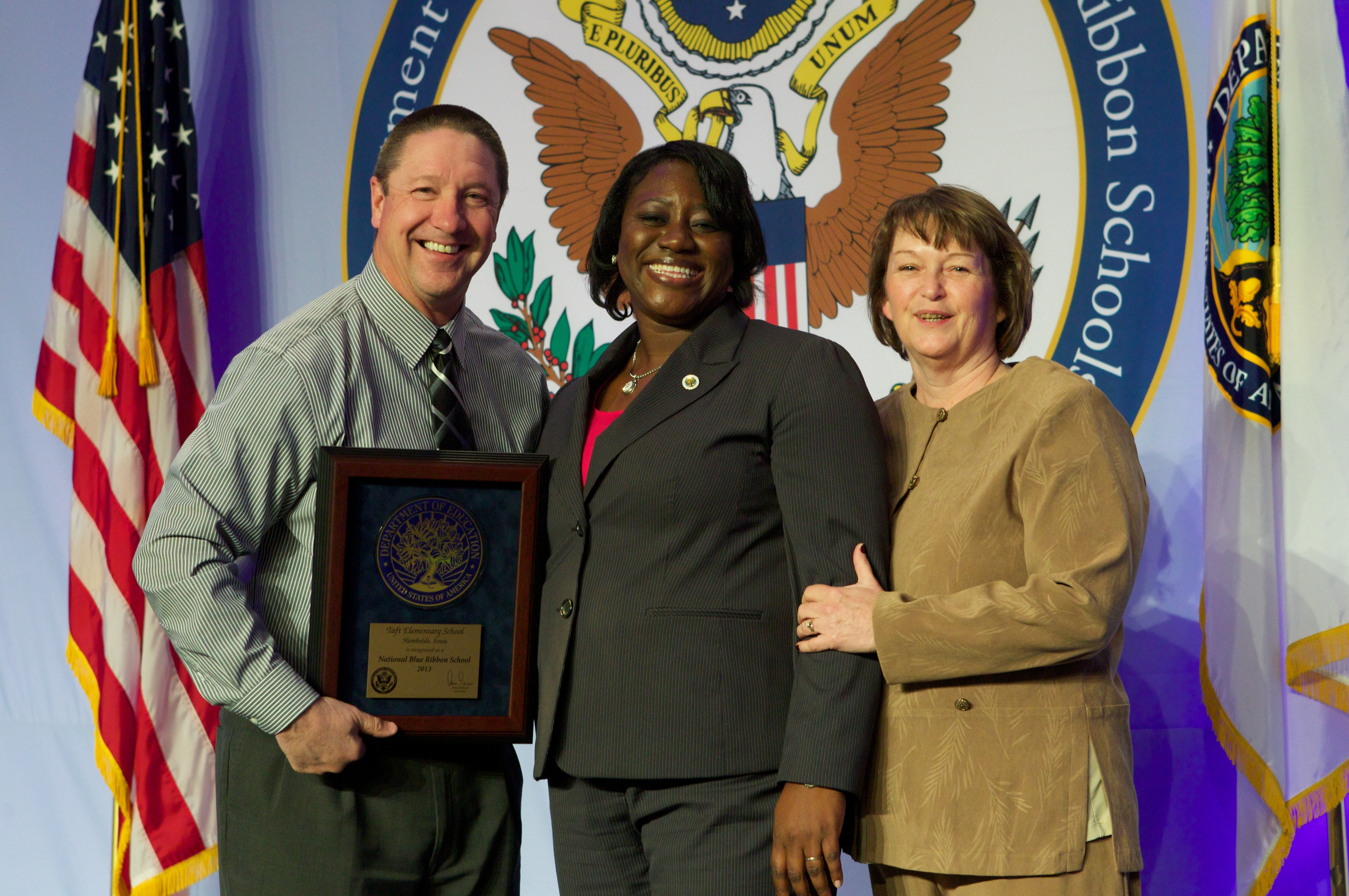
- Taft Elementary School 2013 National Blue Ribbon Schools winner

== See also ==
- List of school districts in Iowa
