= Boone Valley Community School District =

School district in Iowa, United States

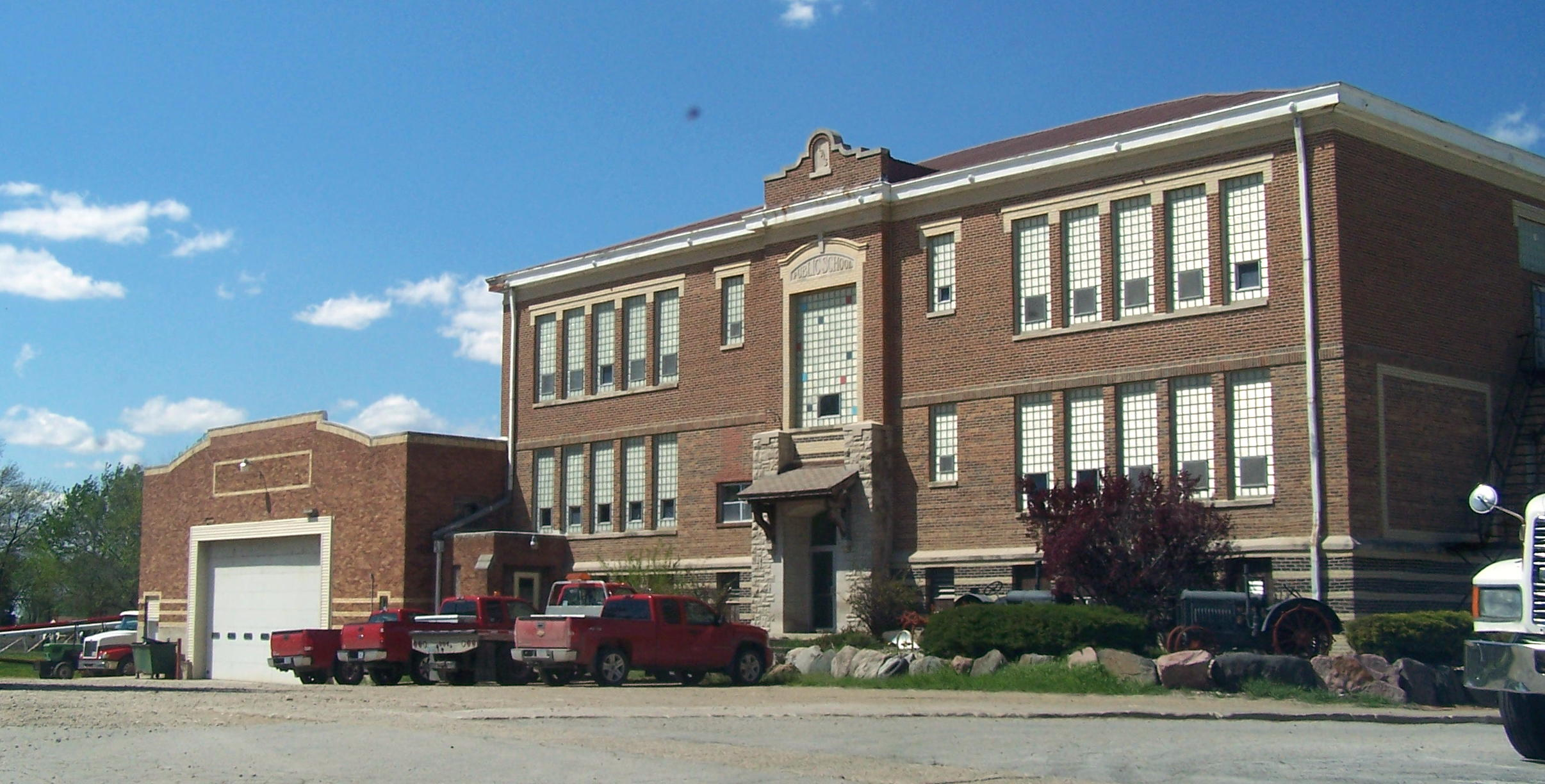
The old Renwick Public School building.

Boone Valley Community School District was a school district in Iowa, based in Renwick.

== History ==
What became the Boone Valley School was built in 1915.

The school district began operations in 1956, via the merger of the Hardy Community School, the Renwick Community School, and the Vernon Community School. The district placed Kindergarten and grade 1 in Renwick, grades 204 in Hardy, grades 5–8 in Vernon, and high school in Renwick. In 1963, when enrollment was around 425, the district built an addition to the school building in Renwick.

In 1964, the school district had 450 students. Wesley Carlson became superintendent circa 1958 and was in that role until 1964, when he took the superintendent position at the North Fayette County Community School District.

The district had 440, 240, 109, and 110 students under its jurisdiction in 1966, 1984, 1987, and 1988, respectively.

The population of Renwick as well as the district's school declined by 1987. The district previously covered all grades, but it closed its middle and high schools effective fall 1987. Beginning circa 1987, the school district had a grade sharing agreement with the Humboldt Community School District where it contracted preschool, middle school, and high school levels to that district. The district's school took grades 1-6 only. In 1987 four people worked as full time teachers for the school. Other teaching staff were on a part-time basis.

In 1987 the district's board of trustees chose to stop using its own administrators and to use the administration of the Humboldt district. That meant Carlson, now working for the Humboldt district, received superintendent duties once more for the Boone Valley district. Bob Secter stated that, by then, the district was "anticipating its own demise".

In 1988, the district educated 54 students, while 56 students at the secondary level were in the district's boundary.

=== Closure ===
In February 1988 there was a referendum, held at Renwick City Hall, on whether the district should cease to exist (different from being annexed by another school district). 200 residents voted for the closure of the district, while 162 voted against. This meant that the district was the first in Iowa history to be dissolved. There were about 600 eligible voters, so the turnout was about 60%.

On July 1, 1988, the district ceased to exist. Secter stated in 1987 that 15 people would lose their jobs with the end of the district. The Humboldt district absorbed about 62% of the Boone Valley territory, while about 33% went to the Clarion Community School District (which later merged into the Clarion–Goldfield Community School District). The remainder was divided between the Corwith-Wesley, Goldfield, and LuVerne districts. The Eagle Grove Eagle stated that the projected number of Boone Valley students who were to go to Humboldt was 92, and that the Humboldt district would be "the big gainer". The Clarion and Humboldt districts came to an agreement that any students who were redistricted in the Clarion district but who were already attending high school in Humboldt could continue to attend high school in Humboldt.

The Boone Valley School itself closed in 1988, and the Humboldt district immediately took possession of the building. In 1989 alumnus Frank Siemens and his family bought it for $5,000. The business Boone Valley Implement is in the former school. By 2015 Siemens spent $500,000 to refurbish the building. In 2015 Jason Clayworth and Charles Litchfield of the Des Moines Register stated "A large portion of the older section of the school remains relatively unused."
