= Corydon Brown House =

Historic house in Iowa, United States

- U.S. National Register of Historic Places
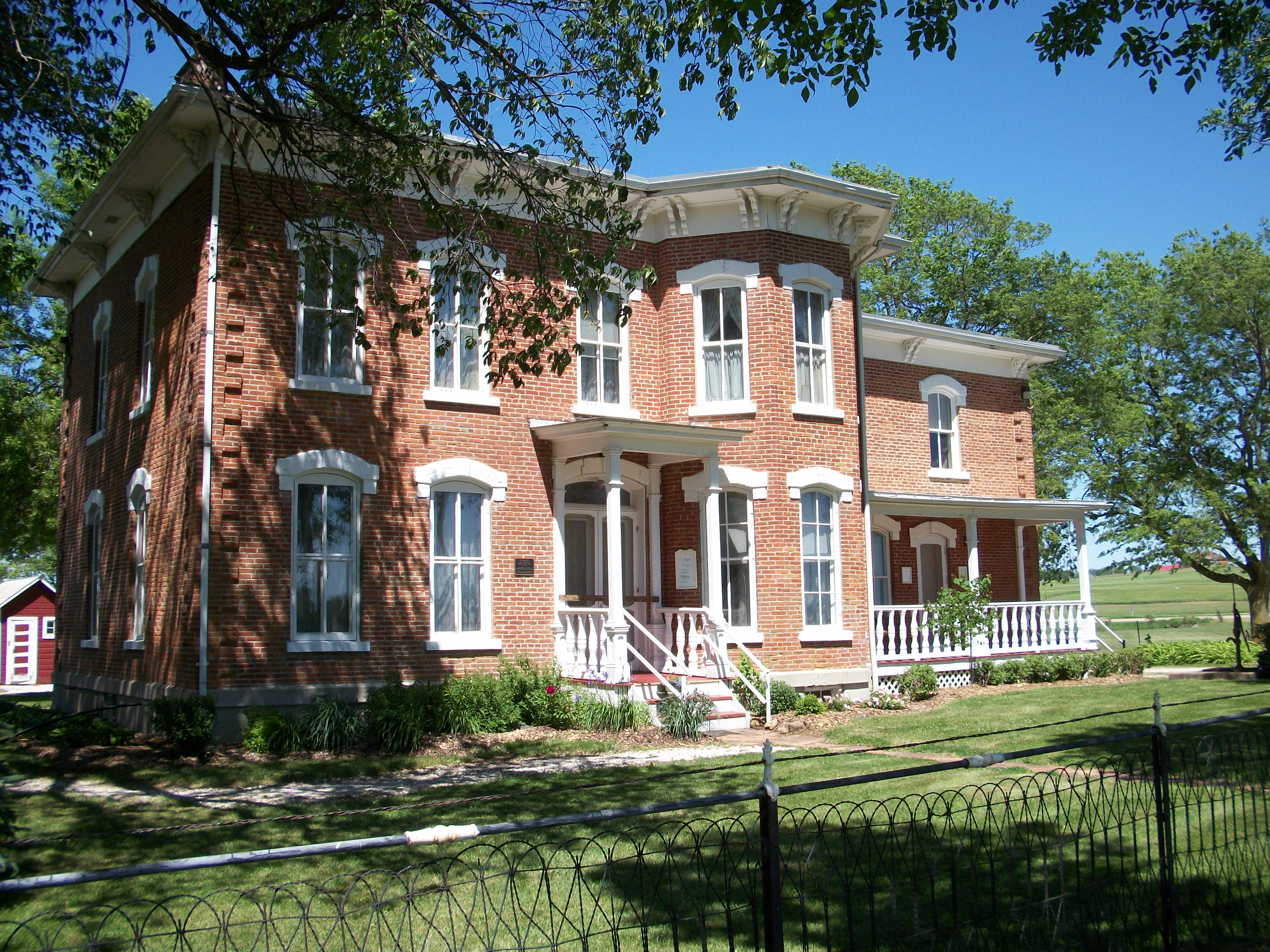

- Location within Iowa Location within the United States
- Location: Humboldt County Historical Museum (off IA 3), Dakota City, Iowa
- Coordinates: 42°43′28″N 94°11′27″W
- Area: 0.6 acres (0.24 ha)
- Built: 1878
- Architectural style: Italianate
- NRHP reference No.: 7800122378001223
- Added to NRHP: November 14, 1978

The Corydon Brown House is a house in Dakota City, Iowa, United States. It was listed on the National Register of Historic Places on November 14, 1978. Corydon Brown, the former owner of the house, was a miller, and the house was a social hub for many years.

== Early Days of the House ==
Corydon Brown, a member of a well-to-do family in Syracuse, New York, decided to move to Dakota City, Iowa in the 1860s. Brown's wife did not want to leave the comforts of the city for the hard prairie living that was guaranteed in Iowa. Brown, without his wife, took a train to Dubuque, Iowa, a stagecoach to Fort Dodge, Iowa, and followed a Native American horse trail north to Dakota City. When Brown reached Dakota City, he found men living in log cabins and caves near the Des Moines River. Brown purchased over 600 acres (240 ha) of prairie, and began to build a home using area clay for bricks and limestone. Brown's wife said she would move to Iowa only when she could move into a house of comparable quality, and after eleven years, she followed her husband to the prairie.

== The Browns move on ==
Corydon and his wife lived in the house for eleven years until following one of their five children to Des Moines, Iowa. As tradition dictated, the eldest son took over the property. However, he did not want to live on a farm, so the property was passed to the second-eldest son. The property was sold to another family, and was later converted to apartments. A buyer purchased the farmland and apartments, but did not use the house. The formerly stately home was used as a dumping ground by neighbors.

== Donation ==
The grounds were donated to the Humboldt County Historical Association. It was renovated, and many other historical buildings have been moved to the site, now named the Humboldt County Mill Farm Historical Museum.

== Architecture ==
The Corydon Brown House is vernacular form of Italianate residential architecture. The two-story brick structure measures 30 by 60 feet (9.1 by 18.3 m). The bricks for the house were manufactured on site. The house features a bracketed cornice on the front and side elevations, and brick quoining on the corners, and two porches with flat roofs and narrow wooden posts.

== See also ==
- Humboldt County, Iowa
- National Register of Historic Places listings in Iowa
