= Humboldt, Iowa =

- City
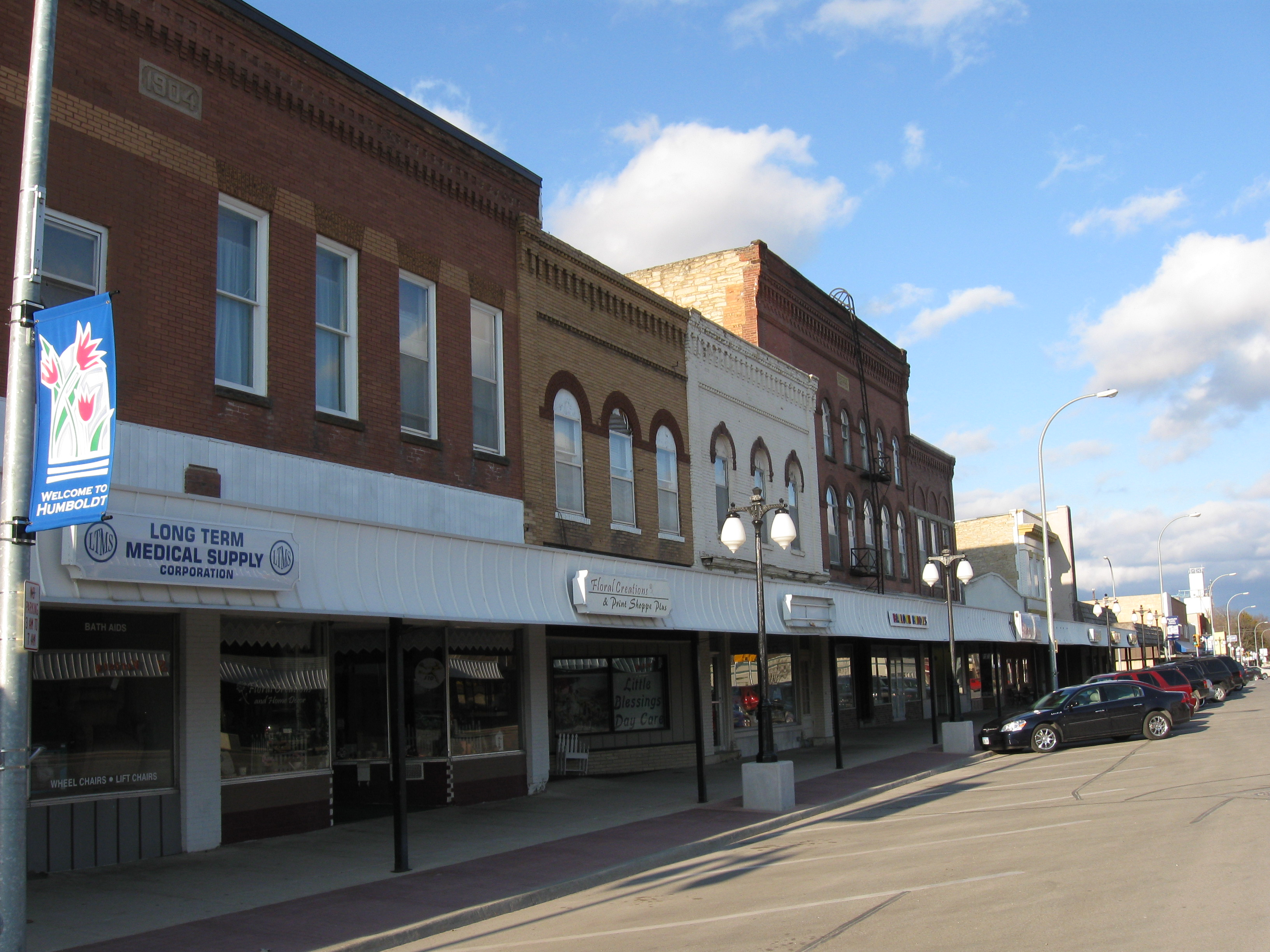
- Streetside in Humboldt

- Location of Humboldt, Iowa
- Coordinates: 42°43′22″N 94°13′28″W
- Country: US
- State: Iowa
- County: Humboldt
- Established: 1863

Area
  - Total: 4.68 sq mi (12.13 km^{2})
  - Land: 4.53 sq mi (11.73 km^{2})
  - Water: 0.15 sq mi (0.40 km^{2})
- Elevation: 1,079 ft (329 m)

Population (2020)
  - Total: 4,792
  - Density: 1,058.1/sq mi (408.54/km^{2})
- Time zone: UTC-6 (Central (CST))
  - Summer (DST): UTC-5 (CDT)
- ZIP code: 50548
- Area code: 515
- FIPS code: 19-37560
- GNIS feature ID: 468059
- Website: http://www.ci.humboldt.ia.us/

Humboldt is a city in Humboldt County, Iowa, United States. The population was 4,792 at the time of the 2020 census, gaining 102 people over the 2010 total.

== History ==
Frank A. Gotch Park (just south of present-day Humboldt and Dakota City) was the location of prehistoric and some Dakota Indian villages, near where the two forks of the Des Moines River meet. During westward expansion in the 1800s, this area is thought to have been the location of a fort/trading post called Fort Confederation. According to federal records, in 1825, permission was granted to build the fort to trade with the Ihanktonwan Dakota (Yankton Sioux) Indians. Information about the exact details of the fort are unclear, such as if American, French Canadian, or Metis traders built it, bringing up many questions about this fort.

The founder of modern Humboldt, Stephen Harris Taft, laid out the plans for Springvale, the original name of the town, in 1863. It was named Springvale because of the several natural springs found near the Des Moines River. Taft had very big plans for the community, and expected many intellectuals from the East to move to his new community.

Taft had five goals for his idyllic community.

- The town shall be surrounded and full of trees and forests.
- The town shall be free of the sale of intoxicants.
- The town shall be founded upon a saw mill and grist mill on the Des Moines River
- The town shall have the moral fortitude of a solid church and good schools, and that it shall become a town of thinkers and beauty.
- The town shall grow with a college of university importance, and have a church that will not dissent into factions.

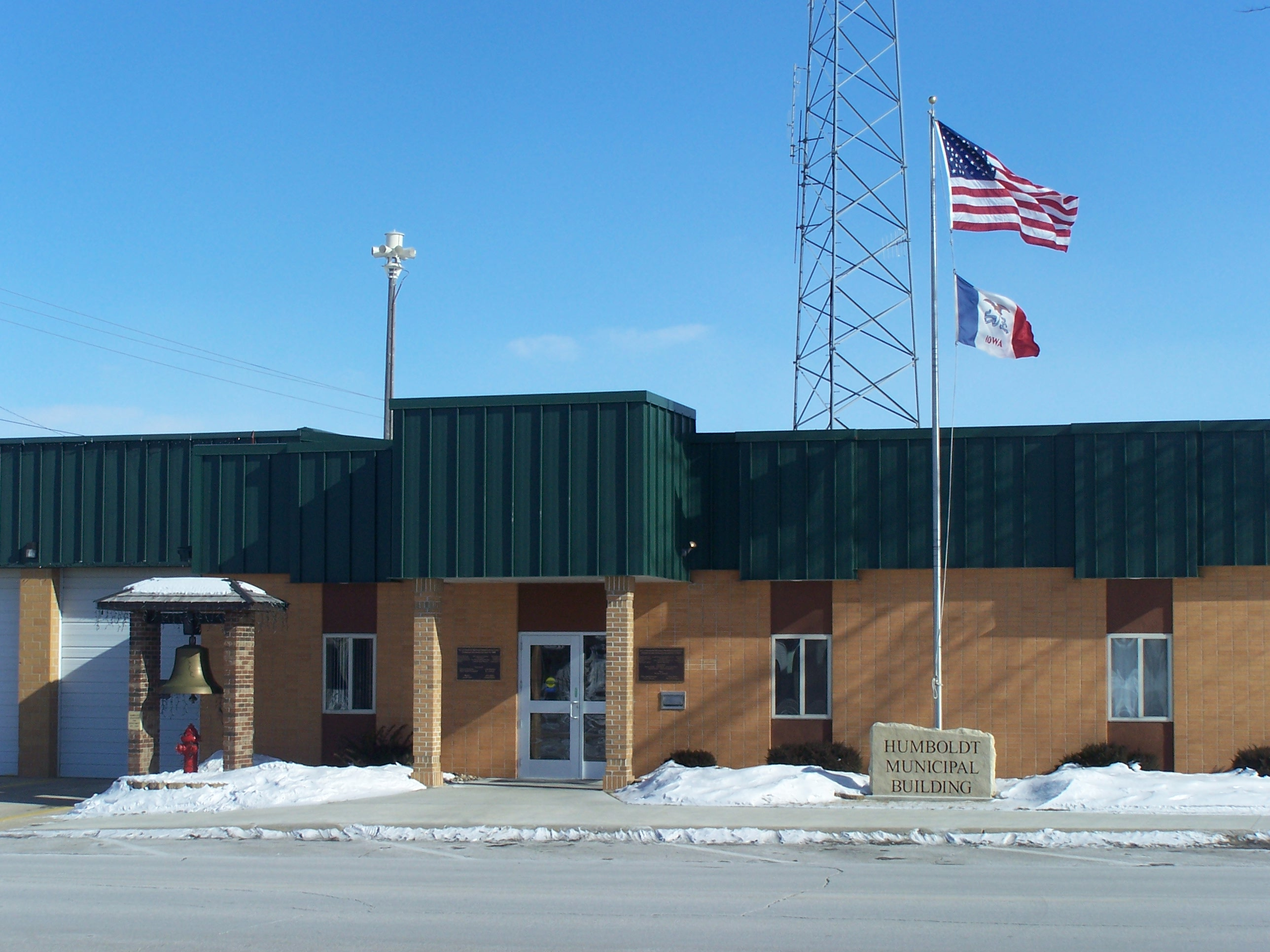
Humboldt Municipal Building

Taft undertook the great task of turning empty, blooming prairie into the community of his dreams. He brought out a group of settlers (including a doctor) in 1863, and they lived together in the few houses that had been built. The grist mill was built, known now as the Corydon Brown House. The first few years were spent laying out the town. Taft wanted very wide boulevards throughout the town, and the community is still known for its streets. Taft also edited the Humboldt County True Democrat through the offices of the Fort Dodge Sentinel in Fort Dodge.

Springvale was renamed Humboldt (after the German explorer and naturalist Alexander von Humboldt) in hope of a merger between Springvale and Dakota City (the county seat of Humboldt County), but no merger took place. This is the first of two major shortcomings that would stunt Humboldt's growth and keep it from reaching Taft's goals.

A meeting in 1866 occurred that formed the Springvale Collegiate Association, led by Taft. After the flood in 1867 that destroyed the town's dam, the issue became popular again in 1869. The association was renamed to Humboldt Collegiate Association in accordance with the town's name change. It was reported that "great enthusiasm" was the feeling in the room, however when the question was posed to the county's voters on October 12, 1869, the measure to appropriate swampland for a Northern Iowa College was defeated. Taft was not defeated, however, and looked East for funding. After almost missing a payment deadline that would've sunk the college for good, Taft broke ground on June 17, 1870. He ended his address by saying "Hundreds are here present today. Tens of thousands shall gather here a hundred years hence to commemorate the birth of the institution and rejoice in the blessings it shall have conferred."

Humboldt College opened its doors on September 13, 1872. The first three years were designed as preparatory work intended to supplement the pupils' public education that ended around eighth grade. The subsequent four years were college work. June 1879 brought the first graduation class of three families. They would be the only students to ever receive a degree from the institution. At this time, Taft and the college were in financial trouble. An endowment fund capable of supporting Taft's vision seemed impossible to create, and following turbulent financial times in the East, the college closed in 1916. The building was razed in 1926, following unsuccessful attempts to rent the structure. Without the college, Taft's dreams of Humboldt becoming an intellectual center of knowledge in the West could not be realized.

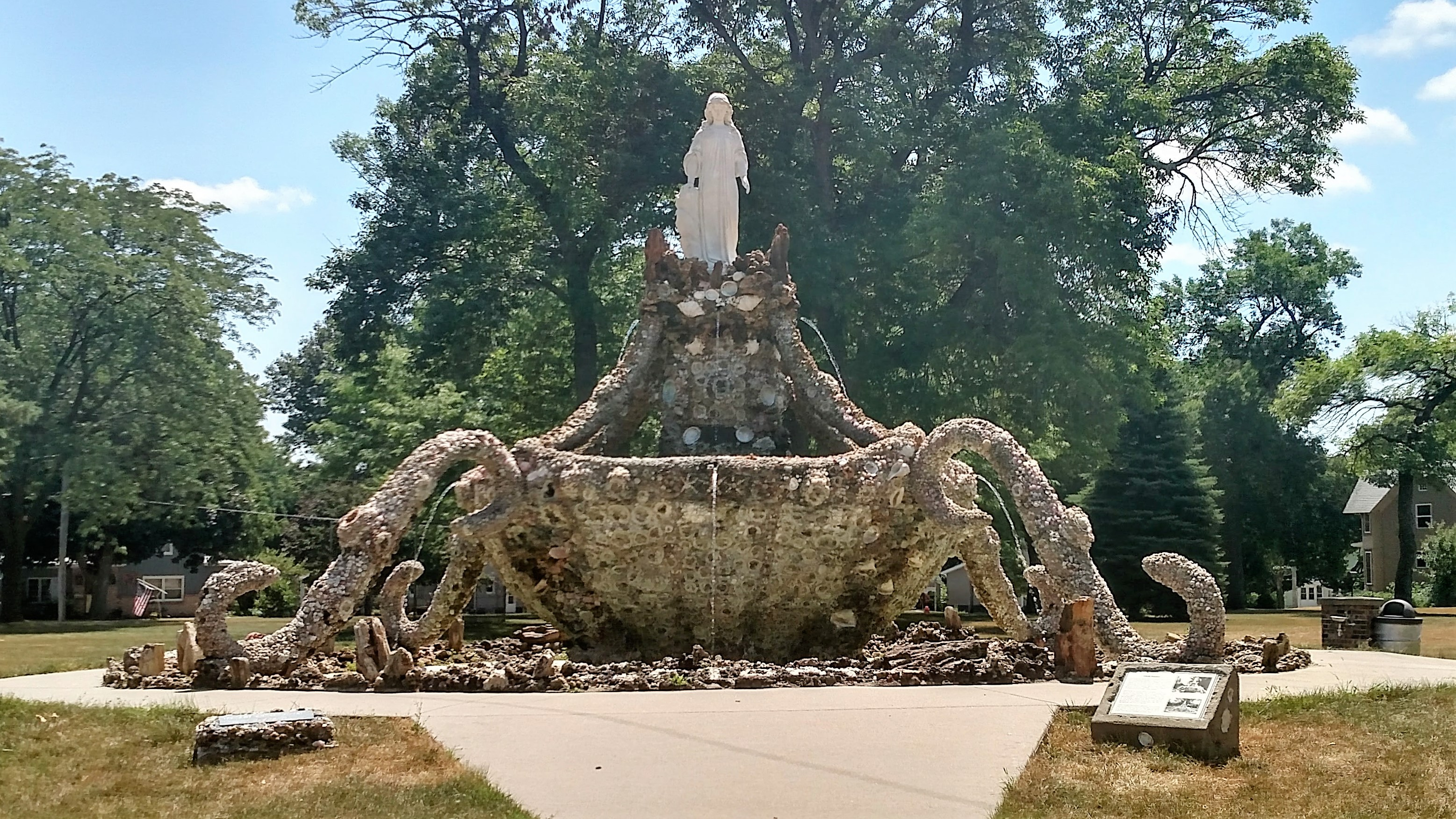
The Liberty Fountain was built in John Brown Park in 1918 by Paul Dobberstein, best known for the nearby Grotto of the Redemption

In July 1955, when contacts between Americans and Soviets were rare, Humboldt hosted a delegation of Soviet officials (and national and international reporters) for an overnight glimpse of rural American life.

On March 27, 1972, ABC-TV broadcast a half-hour documentary on Humboldt entitled "A Small Town in Iowa." The program was written and produced by Andy Rooney and narrated by Harry Reasoner, a Humboldt native. The show portrayed Humboldt as a kind of paradise that struggled to keep its most talented youth from leaving for larger cities, and asked, "what is it about paradise that's turning the bright kids off?" The answer, according to Reasoner and Rooney, was that "what seems to be missing is more a shortcoming of ours, than of the small town. It is that those of us with ego and ambition are not usually happy performing in front of an audience the size a small town provides."

The First National Bank of Humboldt and its shareholders were the primary victims of what the Des Moines Register described as “one of the most spectacular white-collar crimes in state history.” In 1982 Humboldt native Gary Vance Lewellyn, then a Des Moines stockbroker, attempted to pump up the value of the stock of a high-tech company by singlehandedly creating phony market demand for it. To carry out the scheme, he illegally obtained access to bonds of the First National Bank of Humboldt valued at $16.7 million, and secretly pledged the Bank's bonds as security for his personal orders of the company's stock through Wall Street investment firms. When Lewellyn missed margin calls on his stock purchases, the firms obtained the bonds. Suspicious federal regulators closed the Humboldt Bank when it could not account for its missing bonds (and considered, but rejected, the idea of liquidating it). Its accountholders were protected by federal insurance but the shares in the bank became worthless. For his crime, Lewellyn was sentenced to twenty years in prison, but served only five years. Lewellyn died in 2012.

== Geography ==
According to the United States Census Bureau, the city has a total area of 4.80 square miles (12.43 km^{2}), of which 4.64 square miles (12.02 km^{2}) is land and 0.16 square miles (0.41 km^{2}) is water.

Humboldt County is located entirely within the Des Moines Lobe of the Western Corn Belt Plains ecoregion, as defined by the United States Environmental Protection Agency (EPA). One of the flattest regions in Iowa, the Des Moines Lobe ecoregion is a distinctive area naturally defined by Wisconsin glaciation but modified by humans for extensive agriculture. In general, the land is level to gently rolling with some areas of relief defined by glacial features like moraines, hummocky knobs, and kettles, and outwash deposits. The lobe does not have any loess deposits like the Loess Hills to the west.

The stream network is poorly developed and widely spaced, with major rivers carving valleys that are relatively deep and steep-sided. Almost all of the natural lakes of Iowa are found in the northern part of this region (the Iowa Great Lakes). Most of the region has been converted from wet prairie to agricultural use with substantial surface water drainage. Only a small fraction of the wetlands remain, and many natural lakes have been drained as a result of agricultural drainage projects via drainage tiles or ditches.

=== Climate ===
Humboldt, like almost all of Iowa, has a humid continental climate (Köppen Dfa). Humboldt experiences all four seasons characterized by cold winters, wet springs, hot summers, and relatively short autumns. Wide temperature ranges are common within this climate zone.

Climate data for Humboldt, Iowa
Month	Jan	Feb	Mar	Apr	May	Jun	Jul	Aug	Sep	Oct	Nov	Dec	Year
Record high °F (°C)	63 (17)	70 (21)	87 (31)	97 (36)	106 (41)	106 (41)	109 (43)	111 (44)	102 (39)	95 (35)	81 (27)	65 (18)	111 (44)
Mean daily maximum °F (°C)	25 (−4)	31 (−1)	44 (7)	59 (15)	72 (22)	81 (27)	84 (29)	81 (27)	74 (23)	62 (17)	43 (6)	29 (−2)	57 (14)
Mean daily minimum °F (°C)	7 (−14)	14 (−10)	25 (−4)	37 (3)	49 (9)	58 (14)	62 (17)	60 (16)	50 (10)	38 (3)	25 (−4)	12 (−11)	36 (2)
Record low °F (°C)	−42 (−41)	−33 (−36)	−22 (−30)	3 (−16)	19 (−7)	34 (1)	37 (3)	34 (1)	21 (−6)	−2 (−19)	−14 (−26)	−25 (−32)	−42 (−41)
Average precipitation inches (mm)	0.88 (22)	0.80 (20)	2.16 (55)	3.28 (83)	3.89 (99)	4.79 (122)	4.29 (109)	4.12 (105)	2.95 (75)	2.28 (58)	1.74 (44)	1.07 (27)	32.25 (819)
Source: The Weather Channel

== Demographics ==
Historical populations
Year	Pop.	±%
1870	335	—
1880	606	+80.9%
1890	1,075	+77.4%
1900	1,474	+37.1%
1910	1,809	+22.7%
1920	2,232	+23.4%
1930	2,251	+0.9%
1940	2,819	+25.2%
1950	3,219	+14.2%
1960	4,031	+25.2%
1970	4,665	+15.7%
1980	4,794	+2.8%
1990	4,438	−7.4%
2000	4,452	+0.3%
2010	4,690	+5.3%
2020	4,792	+2.2%
Source:"U.S. Census website". United States Census Bureau. and Iowa Data Center; Source: U.S. Decennial Census

=== 2020 census ===
As of the 2020 census, there were 4,792 people, 2,051 households, and 1,234 families residing in the city. The population density was 1,058.1 inhabitants per square mile (408.5/km^{2}). There were 2,256 housing units at an average density of 498.1 per square mile (192.3/km^{2}).

The median age was 40.7 years. 24.1% of residents were under the age of 18 and 23.4% were 65 years of age or older. 26.5% of residents were under the age of 20; 4.5% were between the ages of 20 and 24; 23.4% were from 25 to 44; and 22.2% were from 45 to 64. For every 100 females, there were 92.4 males, and for every 100 females age 18 and over there were 90.9 males age 18 and over. The gender makeup of the city was 48.0% male and 52.0% female.

94.2% of residents lived in urban areas, while 5.8% lived in rural areas.

Of the 2,051 households, 26.9% had children under the age of 18 living in them. Of all households, 48.2% were married-couple households, 5.0% were cohabiting-couple households, 18.4% were households with a male householder and no spouse or partner present, and 28.3% were households with a female householder and no spouse or partner present. About 39.8% of households were non-families, 35.3% were made up of individuals, and 17.6% had someone living alone who was 65 years of age or older.

There were 2,256 housing units, of which 9.1% were vacant. The homeowner vacancy rate was 3.2% and the rental vacancy rate was 8.1%.

Racial composition as of the 2020 census
Race	Number	Percent
White	4,392	91.7%
Black or African American	42	0.9%
American Indian and Alaska Native	7	0.1%
Asian	16	0.3%
Native Hawaiian and Other Pacific Islander	0	0.0%
Some other race	192	4.0%
Two or more races	143	3.0%
Hispanic or Latino (of any race)	303	6.3%

=== 2010 census ===
As of the census of 2010, there were 4,690 people, 2,091 households, and 1,250 families residing in the city. The population density was 1,010.8 inhabitants per square mile (390.3/km^{2}). There were 2,246 housing units at an average density of 484.1 per square mile (186.9/km^{2}). The racial makeup of the city was 94.9% White, 0.6% African American, 0.1% Native American, 0.4% Asian, 3.0% from other races, and 0.9% from two or more races. Hispanic or Latino of any race were 5.0% of the population.

There were 2,091 households, of which 24.9% had children under the age of 18 living with them, 48.2% were married couples living together, 7.9% had a female householder with no husband present, 3.7% had a male householder with no wife present, and 40.2% were non-families. 35.8% of all households were made up of individuals, and 17.9% had someone living alone who was 65 years of age or older. The average household size was 2.18 and the average family size was 2.80.

The median age in the city was 45.3 years. 22.4% of residents were under the age of 18; 7.3% were between the ages of 18 and 24; 19.9% were from 25 to 44; 26% were from 45 to 64; and 24.5% were 65 years of age or older. The gender makeup of the city was 47.7% male and 52.3% female.

=== 2000 census ===
As of the census of 2000, there were 4,452 people, 1,965 households, and 1,202 families residing in the city. The population density was 957.7 inhabitants per square mile (369.8/km^{2}). There were 2,090 housing units at an average density of 449.6 per square mile (173.6/km^{2}). The racial makeup of the city was 98.41% White, 0.20% African American, 0.04% Native American, 0.25% Asian, 0.65% from other races, and 0.45% from two or more races. Hispanic or Latino of any race were 1.50% of the population.

There were 1,965 households, out of which 24.9% had children under the age of 18 living with them, 52.3% were married couples living together, 6.6% had a female householder with no husband present, and 38.8% were non-families. 35.9% of all households were made up of individuals, and 21.1% had someone living alone who was 65 years of age or older. The average household size was 2.18 and the average family size was 2.84.

Age spread: 21.8% under the age of 18, 6.7% from 18 to 24, 22.9% from 25 to 44, 22.0% from 45 to 64, and 26.5% who were 65 years of age or older. The median age was 44 years. For every 100 females, there were 86.4 males. For every 100 females age 18 and over, there were 82.1 males.

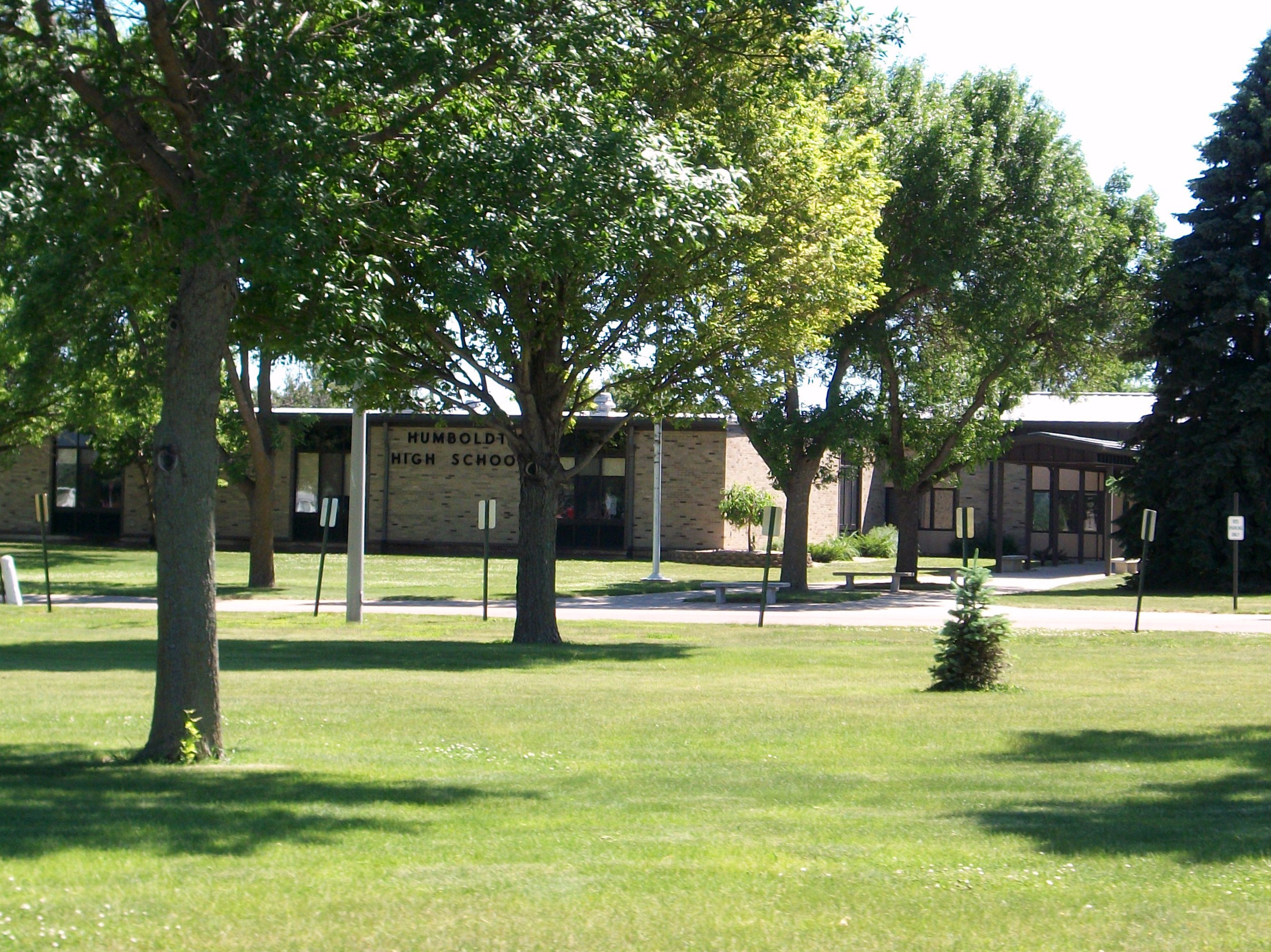
Humboldt High School

The median income for a household in the city was $39,338, and the median income for a family was $49,526. Males had a median income of $32,438 versus $22,586 for females. The per capita income for the city was $19,656. About 4.4% of families and 7.3% of the population were below the poverty line, including 15.0% of those under age 18 and 4.0% of those age 65 or over.

== Education ==
The Humboldt Community School District operates public schools. The city is served by Mease Elementary (Dakota City), Taft Elementary School, Humboldt Middle School, and Humboldt High School.

== Notable people ==
- G. Duncan Bauman (1912–2003) - Newspaper reporter, editor, publisher of the St. Louis Globe-Democrat, 1977-84
- Jack Clancy - Football player for the Miami Dolphins
- Christian Clemenson - Emmy Award-winning actor
- Kevin Dresser - Head wrestling coach, and 1986 national wrestling champion at the University of Iowa
- Theodore G. Garfield - Second-longest-serving justice of the Iowa Supreme Court, 1941–1969
- Frank A. Gotch - world heavyweight wrestling champion from 1908 to 1915
- Frank A. Gotch (MD) - American physician
- L. W. Housel - Former Connecticut State Legislator (1901–1902). (1928 and 1932).
- Byron McKeeby - American artist, educator and master printmaker
- John H. Mitchell (1899–1992) - Iowa state representative and attorney general
- Jon Porter - U.S. Representative from Nevada
- Harry Reasoner - CBS and ABC news correspondent and television host
- Bruce Reimers - NFL offensive guard for Cincinnati and Tampa Bay
- Dick Schultz - College sports coach, executive director of the United States Olympic Committee
