= Dakota City, Iowa =

- City
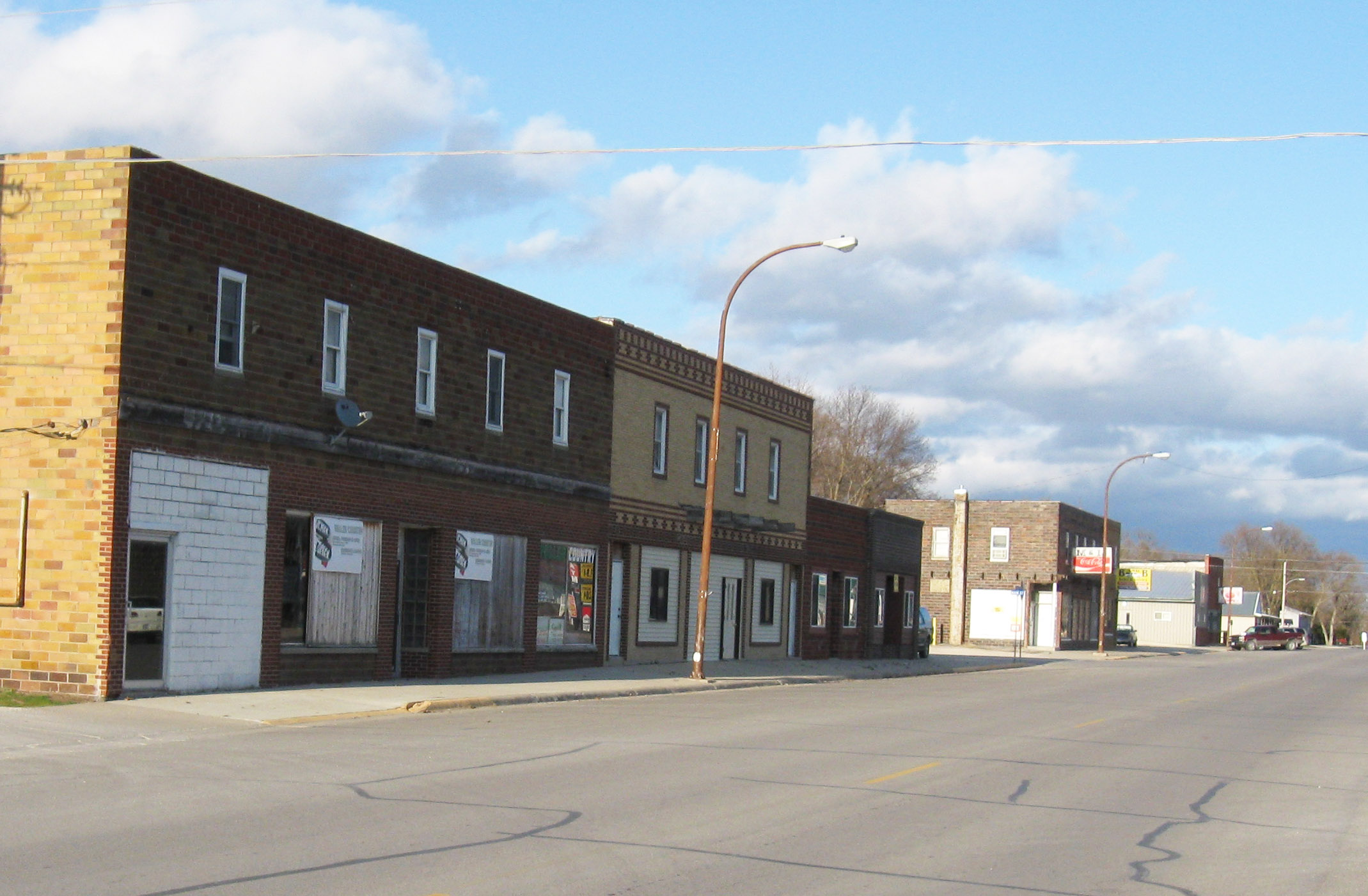
- Street in downtown Dakota City

- Location of Dakota City, Iowa
- Coordinates: 42°43′22″N 94°11′52″W
- Country: United States
- State: Iowa
- County: Humboldt

Area
  - Total: 0.77 sq mi (1.99 km^{2})
  - Land: 0.73 sq mi (1.89 km^{2})
  - Water: 0.039 sq mi (0.10 km^{2})
- Elevation: 1,129 ft (344 m)

Population (2020)
  - Total: 759
  - Density: 1,040/sq mi (401.4/km^{2})
- Time zone: UTC-6 (Central (CST))
  - Summer (DST): UTC-5 (CDT)
- ZIP code: 50529
- Area code: 515
- FIPS code: 19-18075
- GNIS feature ID: 467672
- Website: dakotacityiowa.com

Dakota City is a city in and the county seat of Humboldt County, Iowa, United States. The population was 759 at the time of the 2020 census. Dakota City shares its western border with the much larger city of Humboldt. It is the least populous county seat in Iowa.

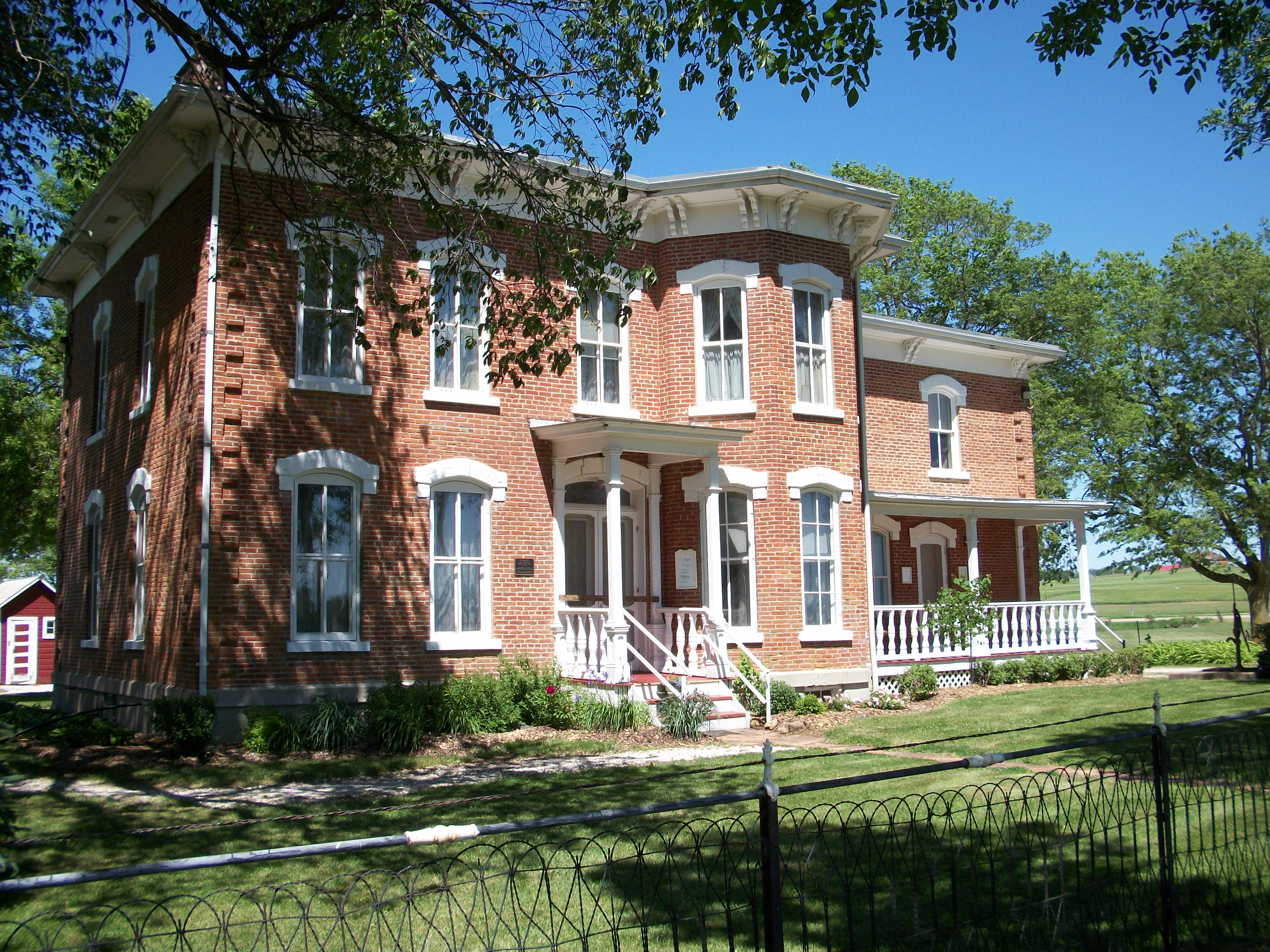
Corydon Brown House

== History ==
Dakota City was laid out in 1855 and was named after the Dakota people. A post office was established as Dakotah in 1856, and renamed Dakota City in 1924.

== Geography ==
According to the United States Census Bureau, the city has a total area of 0.78 square miles (2.02 km^{2}), of which 0.74 square miles (1.92 km^{2}) is land and 0.04 square miles (0.10 km^{2}) is water.

== Demographics ==
Historical populations
Year	Pop.	±%
1870	162	—
1880	248	+53.1%
1890	353	+42.3%
1900	362	+2.5%
1910	391	+8.0%
1920	439	+12.3%
1930	448	+2.1%
1940	537	+19.9%
1950	637	+18.6%
1960	706	+10.8%
1970	746	+5.7%
1980	1,072	+43.7%
1990	1,024	−4.5%
2000	911	−11.0%
2010	843	−7.5%
2020	759	−10.0%
Sources: Source: U.S. Decennial Census

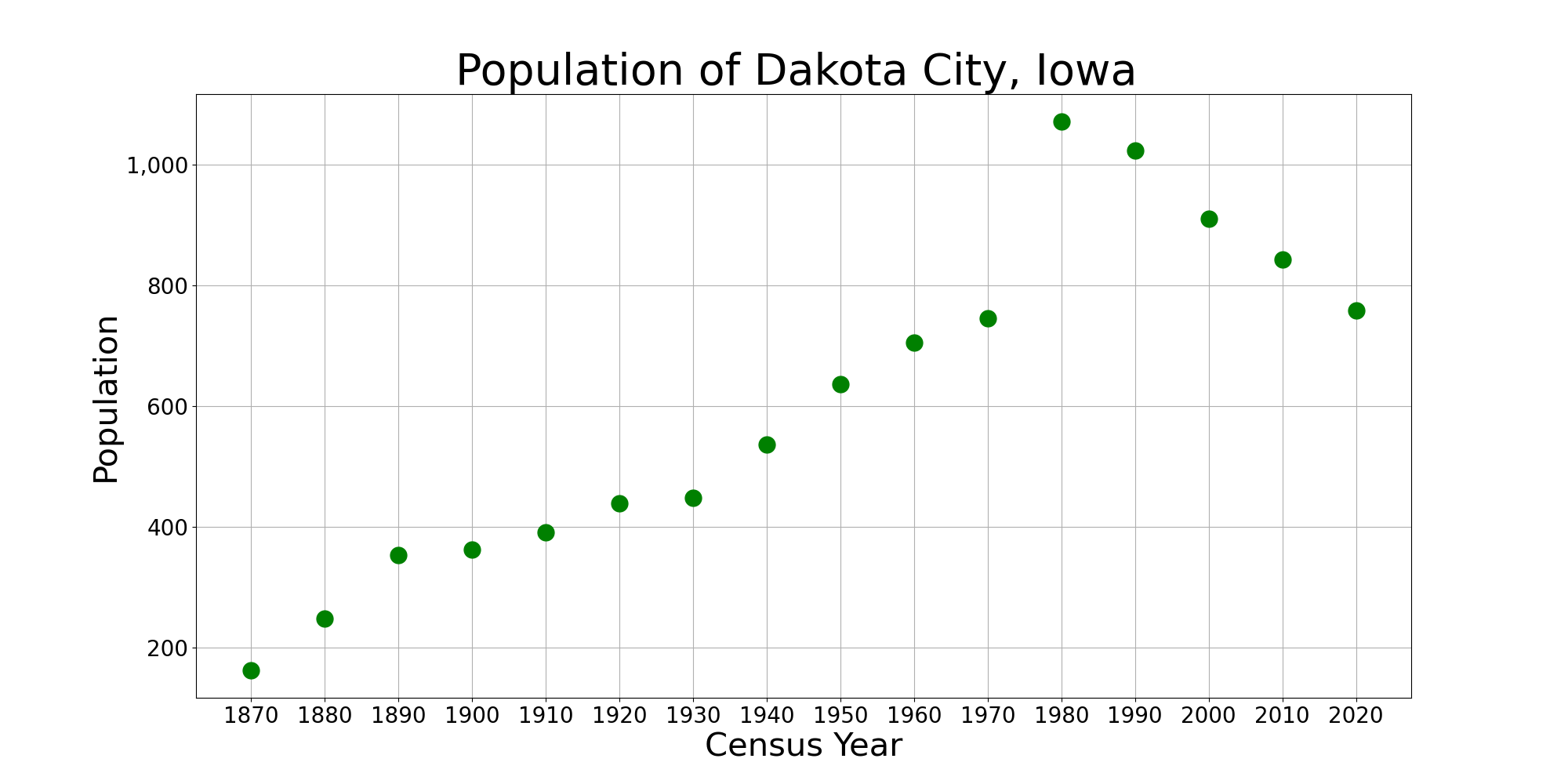
The population of Dakota City, Iowa from US census data

=== 2020 census ===
As of the census of 2020, there were 759 people, 347 households, and 209 families residing in the city. The population density was 1,039.6 inhabitants per square mile (401.4/km^{2}). There were 377 housing units at an average density of 516.4 per square mile (199.4/km^{2}). The racial makeup of the city was 95.4% White, 0.3% Black or African American, 0.4% Native American, 0.1% Asian, 0.0% Pacific Islander, 1.3% from other races and 2.5% from two or more races. Hispanic or Latino persons of any race comprised 3.7% of the population.

Of the 347 households, 27.4% of which had children under the age of 18 living with them, 45.8% were married couples living together, 7.2% were cohabitating couples, 23.1% had a female householder with no spouse or partner present and 23.9% had a male householder with no spouse or partner present. 39.8% of all households were non-families. 34.0% of all households were made up of individuals, 14.4% had someone living alone who was 65 years old or older.

The median age in the city was 41.9 years. 24.1% of the residents were under the age of 20; 4.5% were between the ages of 20 and 24; 25.8% were from 25 and 44; 27.7% were from 45 and 64; and 17.9% were 65 years of age or older. The gender makeup of the city was 50.1% male and 49.9% female.

=== 2010 census ===
As of the census of 2010, there were 843 people, 351 households, and 238 families residing in the city. The population density was 1,139.2 inhabitants per square mile (439.8/km^{2}). There were 382 housing units at an average density of 516.2 per square mile (199.3/km^{2}). The racial makeup of the city was 96.0% White, 0.1% African American, 0.5% Native American, 0.4% Asian, 1.4% from other races, and 1.7% from two or more races. Hispanic or Latino of any race were 4.2% of the population.

There were 351 households, of which 32.2% had children under the age of 18 living with them, 56.4% were married couples living together, 6.6% had a female householder with no husband present, 4.8% had a male householder with no wife present, and 32.2% were non-families. 25.6% of all households were made up of individuals, and 11.7% had someone living alone who was 65 years of age or older. The average household size was 2.40 and the average family size was 2.89.

The median age in the city was 39.3 years. 23.7% of residents were under the age of 18; 8% were between the ages of 18 and 24; 26.3% were from 25 to 44; 27.7% were from 45 to 64; and 14.4% were 65 years of age or older. The gender makeup of the city was 51.0% male and 49.0% female.

=== 2000 census ===
As of the census of 2000, there were 911 people, 356 households, and 253 families residing in the city. The population density was 1,238.0 inhabitants per square mile (478.0/km^{2}). There were 379 housing units at an average density of 515.0 per square mile (198.8/km^{2}). The racial makeup of the city was 99.01% White, 0.11% Native American, 0.11% Asian, 0.44% from other races, and 0.33% from two or more races. Hispanic or Latino of any race were 1.43% of the population.

There were 356 households, out of which 38.5% had children under the age of 18 living with them, 57.3% were married couples living together, 9.6% had a female householder with no husband present, and 28.9% were non-families. 25.0% of all households were made up of individuals, and 11.5% had someone living alone who was 65 years of age or older. The average household size was 2.56 and the average family size was 3.04.

In the city, the population was spread out, with 28.0% under the age of 18, 9.9% from 18 to 24, 31.0% from 25 to 44, 19.9% from 45 to 64, and 11.3% who were 65 years of age or older. The median age was 34 years. For every 100 females, there were 101.5 males. For every 100 females age 18 and over, there were 94.1 males.

The median household income was $33,977 and the median family income was $39,306. Males had a median income of $30,250 versus $23,229 for females. The per capita income for the city was $15,441. About 5.2% of families and 6.6% of the population were below the poverty line, including 6.3% of those under age 18 and 7.3% of those age 65 or over.

== Education ==
The Humboldt Community School District operates public schools. The city is served by Mease Elementary (Dakota City), Taft Elementary School (Humboldt), Humboldt Middle School, and Humboldt High School.

== Point of interest ==
The Three Rivers Bike Trail, built on an abandoned railroad grade, passes through town. One of its interesting features is a trestle just south of its highway 3 overpass where it crosses another abandoned railway — also converted to a trail. The "Three Rivers" refers to the East and West Forks of the Des Moines River and to the Boone River, all of which it spans.

== Notable person ==
- Harry Reasoner - CBS correspondent

== See also ==
- Corydon Brown House is listed on the National Register of Historic Places
- Humboldt County Courthouse
