= High Point Township, Decatur County, Iowa =

High Point Township
- Township
- Location in Decatur County
- Coordinates: 40°46′15″N 93°36′48″W
- Country: United States
- State: Iowa
- County: Decatur

Area
  - Total: 36.44 sq mi (94.37 km^{2})
  - Land: 36.42 sq mi (94.33 km^{2})
  - Water: 0.015 sq mi (0.04 km^{2}) 0.04%
- Elevation: 1,056 ft (322 m)

Population (2000)
  - Total: 169
  - Density: 4.7/sq mi (1.8/km^{2})
- GNIS feature ID: 0468044

High Point Township is a township in Decatur County, Iowa, United States. As of the 2000 census, its population was 169.

== Geography ==
High Point Township covers an area of 36.43 square miles (94.37 square kilometers); of this, 0.02 square miles (0.04 square kilometers) or 0.04 percent is water. The streams of Cobbville Creek, Conner Branch and Jonathan Creek run through this township.

=== Unincorporated towns ===
- High Point

(This list is based on USGS data and may include former settlements.)

=== Adjacent townships ===
- Garden Grove Township (north)
- Richman Township, Wayne County (northeast)
- Clay Township, Wayne County (east)
- Jefferson Township, Wayne County (southeast)
- Woodland Township (south)
- Eden Township (southwest)
- Center Township (west)
- Franklin Township (northwest)

=== Cemeteries ===
The township contains three cemeteries: High Point, McCullough and Trullinger.
