= Woodland Township, Decatur County, Iowa =

Woodland Township
- Township
- Location in Decatur County
- Coordinates: 40°41′10″N 93°37′02″W
- Country: United States
- State: Iowa
- County: Decatur

Area
  - Total: 36.34 sq mi (94.11 km^{2})
  - Land: 36.34 sq mi (94.11 km^{2})
  - Water: 0 sq mi (0 km^{2}) 0%
- Elevation: 932 ft (284 m)

Population (2000)
  - Total: 95
  - Density: 2.6/sq mi (1/km^{2})
- GNIS feature ID: 0469015

Woodland Township is a township in Decatur County, Iowa, United States. As of the 2000 census, its population was 95.

== History ==
Woodland Township was named for the valuable timber which once grew there.

== Geography ==
Woodland Township covers an area of 36.34 square miles (94.11 square kilometers). The streams of Brush Creek, Hog Creek and Turkey Run run through this township.

=== Unincorporated towns ===
- Bracewell
- Woodland

(This list is based on USGS data and may include former settlements.)

=== Adjacent townships ===
- High Point Township (north)
- Clay Township, Wayne County (northeast)
- Jefferson Township, Wayne County (east)
- Grand River Township, Wayne County (southeast)
- Morgan Township (south)
- Hamilton Township (southwest)
- Eden Township (west)
- Center Township (northwest)

=== Cemeteries ===
The township contains five cemeteries: Baker, Beaver, Lentz, Saint Marys and Shields.
