= Morgan Township, Decatur County, Iowa =

Morgan Township
- Township
- Location in Decatur County
- Coordinates: 40°36′25″N 93°37′02″W
- Country: United States
- State: Iowa
- County: Decatur

Area
  - Total: 24.69 sq mi (63.95 km^{2})
  - Land: 24.69 sq mi (63.95 km^{2})
  - Water: 0 sq mi (0 km^{2}) 0%
- Elevation: 1,007 ft (307 m)

Population (2000)
  - Total: 75
  - Density: 3.1/sq mi (1.2/km^{2})
- GNIS feature ID: 0468405

Morgan Township is a township in Decatur County, Iowa, United States. As of the 2000 census, its population was 75.

== History ==
Morgan Township was created in 1850. It was named for county commissioner Josiah Morgan.

== Geography ==
Morgan Township covers an area of 24.69 square miles (63.95 square kilometers). The streams of Caleb Creek, Lick Branch and Steel Creek run through this township.

=== Unincorporated towns ===
- Morgan

(This list is based on USGS data and may include former settlements.)

=== Adjacent townships ===
- Woodland Township (north)
- Jefferson Township, Wayne County (northeast)
- Grand River Township, Wayne County (east)
- Hamilton Township (west)
- Eden Township (northwest)

=== Cemeteries ===
The township contains six cemeteries: Elm, Fugate, Gatliff, Logan, Union and White Oak.
