= Monroe Township, Iowa =

Monroe Township may refer to one of the following places in the State of Iowa:

- Monroe Township, Benton County, Iowa
- Monroe Township, Butler County, Iowa
- Monroe Township, Fremont County, Iowa
- Monroe Township, Johnson County, Iowa
- Monroe Township, Linn County, Iowa
- Monroe Township, Madison County, Iowa
- Monroe Township, Mahaska County, Iowa
- Monroe Township, Monroe County, Iowa
- Monroe Township, Ringgold County, Iowa
- Monroe Township, Shelby County, Iowa
- Monroe Township, Wayne County, Iowa

== See also ==
- Monroe Township (disambiguation)
