= Confidence, Iowa =

- Unincorporated community
- Location within Iowa
- Coordinates: 40°51′46″N 93°07′32″W
- Country: United States
- State: Iowa
- County: Wayne
- Elevation: 1,033 ft (315 m)
- Time zone: UTC-6 (Central (CST))
  - Summer (DST): UTC-5 (CDT)
- Area code: 641
- GNIS feature ID: 455574

Confidence is an unincorporated community in Wayne County, Iowa, United States. Located in south central Iowa, the community lies along County Highway J18 in the northeastern corner of its county, just west of Rathbun Lake.

== History ==
Confidence was originally platted in 1858, and its population and economic activity peaked in the 1920s, the peak of coal mining activity in the area. The first coal mines in the area date from approximately the 1860s, although in the 19th century, they were small, serving only the local market. By the end of the 19th century, L. Frye was the principal mine owner in the area. Frye's mines were in the Mystic coal seam, which was not much over 2 feet (0.61 m) thick in this area. In 1905, he opened a new mine with a 110-foot (34 m) shaft and a steam hoist. This mine was just 1/4 mile south of an older Frye mine that had mined out just 15 acres (61,000 m^{2}) of coal. Other mines in the area included the J. Hayhurst Bank and the Jared Bank.

Confidence's population was 51 in 1902, and 77 in 1925.

The town changed drastically as a result of the Great Depression. In its prime, the town boasted a millinery, a tavern, a shoe shop, and a bank. The bank paid off all its deposits upon closing in 1935.

The population was 77 in 1940.

By the end of the 20th century, Confidence was a virtual ghost town, with only a handful of occupied houses, a derelict church, a cemetery, a park, and the New Providence Baptist Church , housed in its current building since 1981. Its postal address designations are split between Melrose, ZIP code 52569, and Plano, ZIP code 52581. Its area is part of the Wayne Community School District, based in Corydon.

Other nearby towns include Russell, in Lucas County; Albia, seat of Monroe County; Centerville and Moravia, in Appanoose County.
