= Lineville, Iowa =

- City
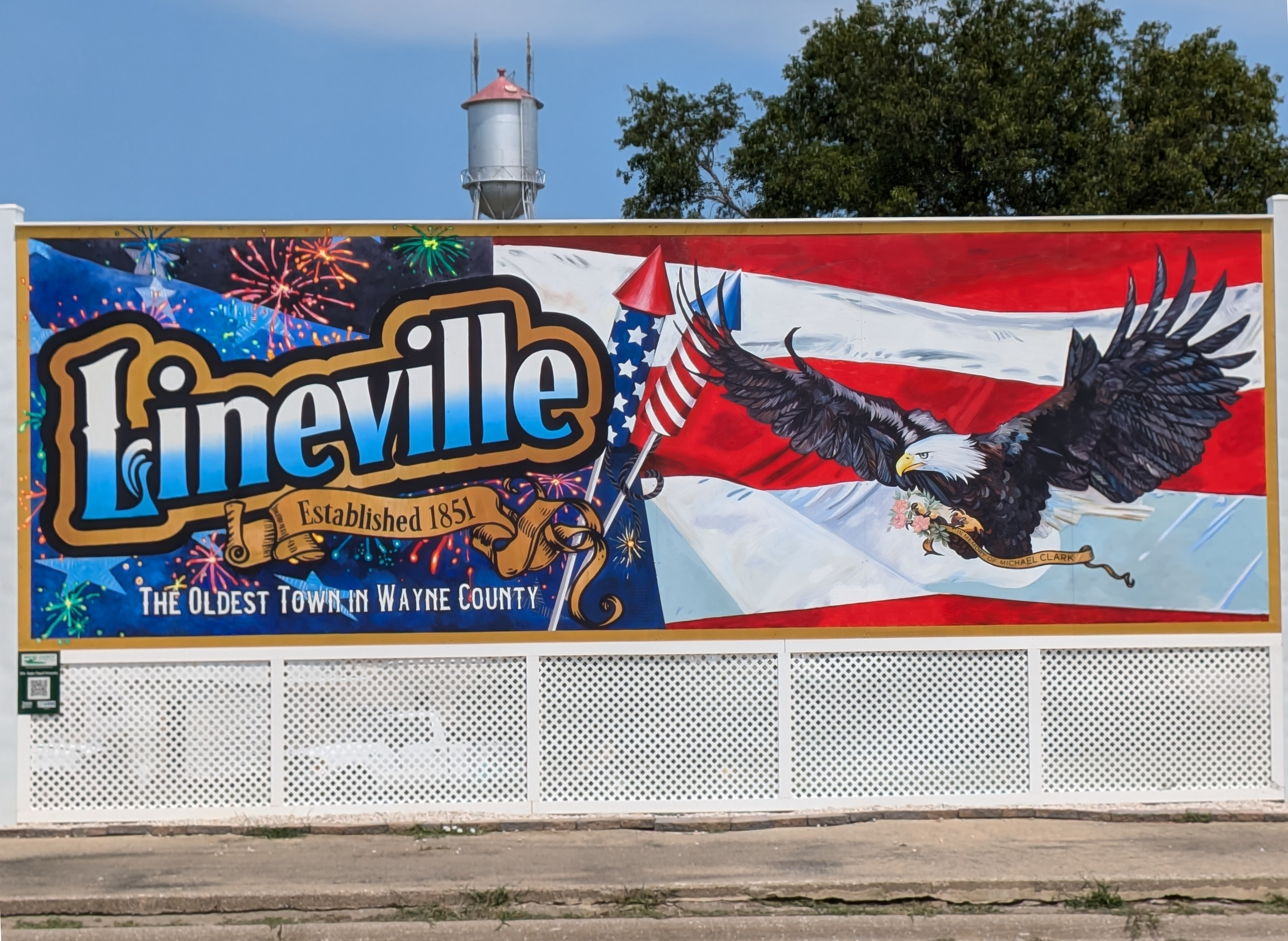
- Lineville town sign

- Location of Lineville, Iowa
- Coordinates: 40°35′13″N 93°31′24″W
- Country: USA
- State: Iowa
- County: Wayne

Area
  - Total: 0.90 sq mi (2.33 km^{2})
  - Land: 0.90 sq mi (2.33 km^{2})
  - Water: 0 sq mi (0.00 km^{2})
- Elevation: 1,089 ft (332 m)

Population (2020)
  - Total: 195
  - Density: 216.5/sq mi (83.59/km^{2})
- Time zone: UTC-6 (Central (CST))
  - Summer (DST): UTC-5 (CDT)
- ZIP code: 50147
- Area code: 641
- FIPS code: 19-45435
- GNIS feature ID: 2395718

Lineville is a city in Wayne County, Iowa, United States. The population was 195 at the time of the 2020 census.

== Geography ==
According to the United States Census Bureau, the city has a total area of 0.90 square miles (2.33 km^{2}), all land.

== History ==
Lineville has been called the oldest town in Wayne County, but was not noted on early maps or in the 1850 state line survey, and probably attracted settlers from a nearby short-lived community called Grand River after the state line dispute was settled. Lineville was platted in 1858.

Because part of the town is in Missouri and part in Iowa, it was named Lineville. The town square sits on the Iowa–Missouri border with the business on the south side of the square in South Lineville, Missouri. When Wayne County was dry, liquor by the drink could be purchased at the bars on the Missouri side of the square.

During the 1968 Illinois earthquake, the quake was felt as a long shaking in Lineville. The quake damaged the town's water tower which began to leak 300 gallons of water an hour.

Lineville used to be part of ACL Community Schools for the three namesake towns of Allerton, Clio and Lineville until 1966 when Allerton voted to join with Cambria-Corydon Community Schools to form Wayne Community Schools. Lineville and Clio then formed Lineville–Clio which survived until 2010. All classes were held in Lineville. It was one of the smallest school districts in the state of Iowa. In 2010, the State of Iowa ordered Lineville–Clio closed as its small size and tax base made it impossible to meet State of Iowa educational standards. Lineville–Clio has since merged with Wayne Community Schools with all classes being held in Corydon (22 road miles away).

== Transportation ==
Lineville is located on U.S. Route 65. The city is served by the Union Pacific Railroad, which was originally the CRI&P (Rock Island). Rail traffic has increased considerably on this line since it was purchased by the Union Pacific. Lineville once had rail passenger service, which was discontinued in the 1960s.

== Demographics ==
Historical populations
Year	Pop.	±%
1880	622	—
1890	606	−2.6%
1900	690	+13.9%
1910	600	−13.0%
1920	707	+17.8%
1930	531	−24.9%
1940	520	−2.1%
1950	482	−7.3%
1960	452	−6.2%
1970	385	−14.8%
1980	319	−17.1%
1990	289	−9.4%
2000	273	−5.5%
2010	217	−20.5%
2020	195	−10.1%
Source:"U.S. Census website". United States Census Bureau. and Iowa Data Center; Source: U.S. Decennial Census

=== 2020 census ===
As of the census of 2020, there were 195 people, 103 households, and 58 families residing in the city. The population density was 216.5 inhabitants per square mile (83.6/km^{2}). There were 111 housing units at an average density of 123.2 per square mile (47.6/km^{2}). The racial makeup of the city was 90.3% White, 1.5% Black or African American, 0.5% Native American, 2.6% Asian, 0.0% Pacific Islander, 0.0% from other races and 5.1% from two or more races. Hispanic or Latino persons of any race comprised 3.6% of the population.

Of the 103 households, 28.2% of which had children under the age of 18 living with them, 35.9% were married couples living together, 8.7% were cohabitating couples, 26.2% had a female householder with no spouse or partner present and 29.1% had a male householder with no spouse or partner present. 43.7% of all households were non-families. 35.9% of all households were made up of individuals, 10.7% had someone living alone who was 65 years old or older.

The median age in the city was 48.2 years. 23.6% of the residents were under the age of 20; 4.6% were between the ages of 20 and 24; 17.9% were from 25 and 44; 35.9% were from 45 and 64; and 17.9% were 65 years of age or older. The gender makeup of the city was 49.7% male and 50.3% female.

=== 2010 census ===
As of the census of 2010, there were 217 people, 108 households, and 60 families living in the city. The population density was 241.1 inhabitants per square mile (93.1/km^{2}). There were 135 housing units at an average density of 150.0 per square mile (57.9/km^{2}). The racial makeup of the city was 99.1% White, 0.5% Asian, and 0.5% from two or more races.

There were 108 households, of which 18.5% had children under the age of 18 living with them, 44.4% were married couples living together, 3.7% had a female householder with no husband present, 7.4% had a male householder with no wife present, and 44.4% were non-families. 39.8% of all households were made up of individuals, and 22.3% had someone living alone who was 65 years of age or older. The average household size was 2.01 and the average family size was 2.68.

The median age in the city was 48.2 years. 16.1% of residents were under the age of 18; 6% were between the ages of 18 and 24; 22.1% were from 25 to 44; 30.4% were from 45 to 64; and 25.3% were 65 years of age or older. The gender makeup of the city was 51.2% male and 48.8% female.

=== 2000 census ===
As of the census of 2000, there were 273 people, 126 households, and 75 families living in the city. The population density was 300.5 inhabitants per square mile (116.0/km^{2}). There were 150 housing units at an average density of 165.1 per square mile (63.7/km^{2}). The racial makeup of the city was 99.63% White and 0.37% Pacific Islander.

There were 126 households, out of which 22.2% had children under the age of 18 living with them, 52.4% were married couples living together, 5.6% had a female householder with no husband present, and 39.7% were non-families. 36.5% of all households were made up of individuals, and 23.8% had someone living alone who was 65 years of age or older. The average household size was 2.17 and the average family size was 2.82.

In the city, the population was spread out, with 22.3% under the age of 18, 4.8% from 18 to 24, 23.8% from 25 to 44, 17.2% from 45 to 64, and 31.9% who were 65 years of age or older. The median age was 44 years. For every 100 females, there were 88.3 males. For every 100 females age 18 and over, there were 91.0 males.

The median income for a household in the city was $30,625, and the median income for a family was $35,357. Males had a median income of $31,094 versus $18,750 for females. The per capita income for the city was $18,414. About 18.1% of families and 24.0% of the population were below the poverty line, including 32.1% of those under the age of eighteen and 22.7% of those 65 or over.

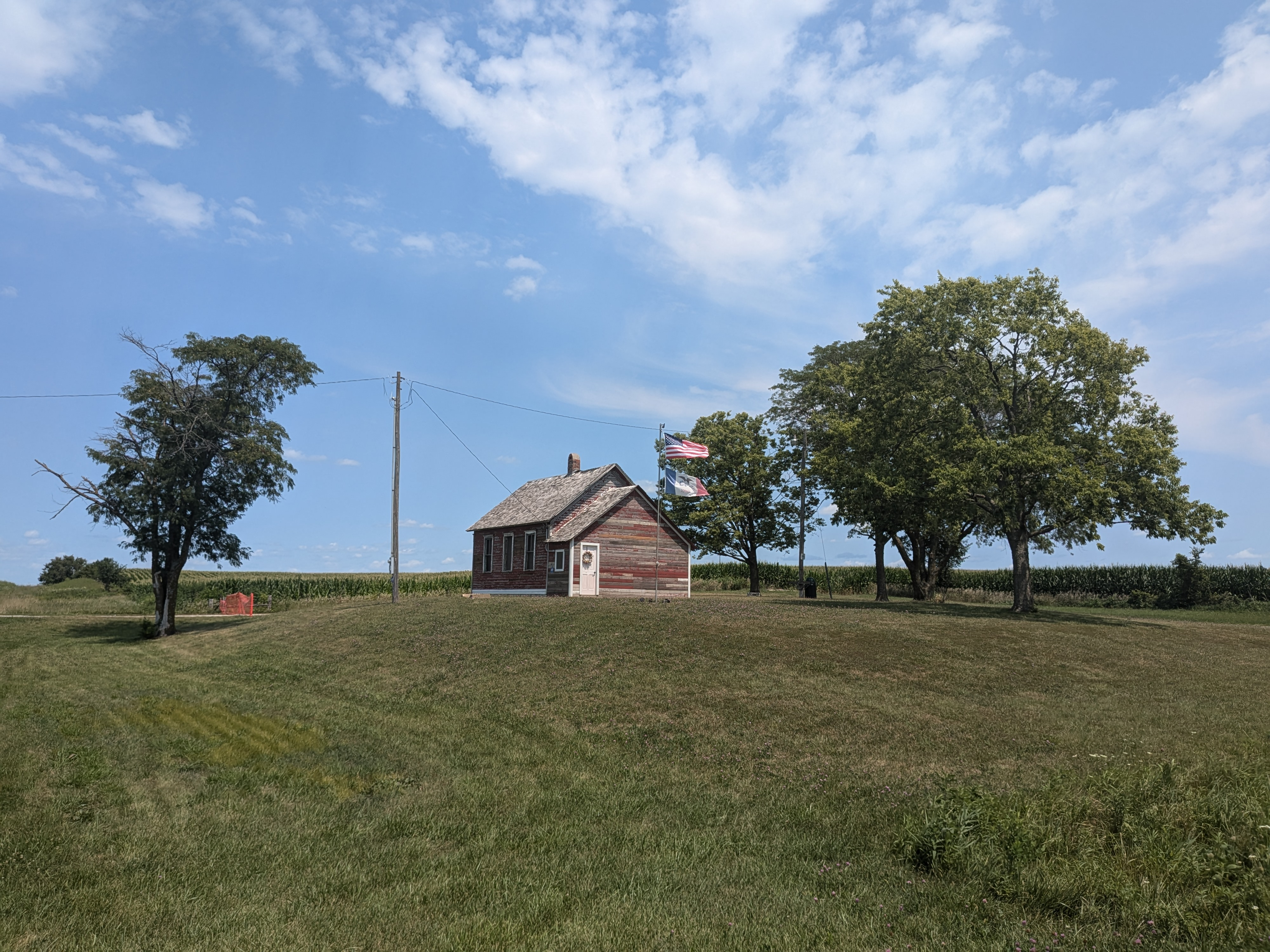
Lineville landmark "The Little Red Schoolhouse"

== Education ==
Wayne Community School District operates public schools serving the community.

It was in the Lineville–Clio Community School District until that district decided to disband in 2010. Lineville–Clio merged into Wayne on July 1, 2011.

== Notable person ==
- Irene Cozad (1888-1970), ragtime composer, born in Lineville
