= Wayne Community School District =

Public school district on Corydon, Iowa, United States

Coordinates: 40.757802°N 93.320641°W

Location
- Corydon, Iowa Wayne, Decatur, and Lucas counties United States
- Coordinates: 40.757802, -93.320641

District information
- Type: Local school district
- Grades: K-12
- Established: 1966
- Superintendent: Mike Still
- Schools: 2
- Budget: $9,312,000 (2020-21)
- NCES District ID: 1930560

Students and staff
- Students: 625 (2022-23)
- Teachers: 47.75 FTE
- Staff: 56.85 FTE
- Student–teacher ratio: 13.09
- Athletic conference: Pride of Iowa
- District mascot: Falcons
- Colors: Black and Silver

Other information
- Website: www.wayne.k12.ia.us

Wayne Community School District or Wayne Community Schools (WCS) is a rural public school district headquartered in Corydon, Iowa. It operates Wayne Elementary School and Wayne Junior/Senior High School.

The district is mostly in Wayne County with small sections in Decatur and Lucas counties. Communities in its service area include Corydon, Allerton, Clio, Lineville, and Millerton.

== History ==
In 1959, the Cambria and Corydon school districts merged to form the Cambria–Corydon Community School District. The Wayne Community School District was formed in 1966 with the merger of the Cambria–Corydon Community School District with the Millerton School District and the former Allerton School District that had for a time been a part of the Allerton–Clio–Lineville (ACL) District. ACL then became the Lineville–Clio Community School District. After the 2008 dissolution of the Russell Community School District, the district absorbed some of the former students of the Russell District. The Lineville–Clio Community School District merged into Wayne on July 1, 2011.

== Schools ==
- Wayne Elementary School
- Wayne Junior/Senior High School

=== Wayne Junior/Senior High School ===
==== Athletics ====
The Falcons compete in the Pride of Iowa Conference in the following sports:

- Football
- Volleyball
- Cross Country
- Basketball
- Wrestling
- Golf
- Track and Field
- Baseball
- Softball

== See also ==
- List of school districts in Iowa
- List of high schools in Iowa
