= Allerton, Iowa =

- City
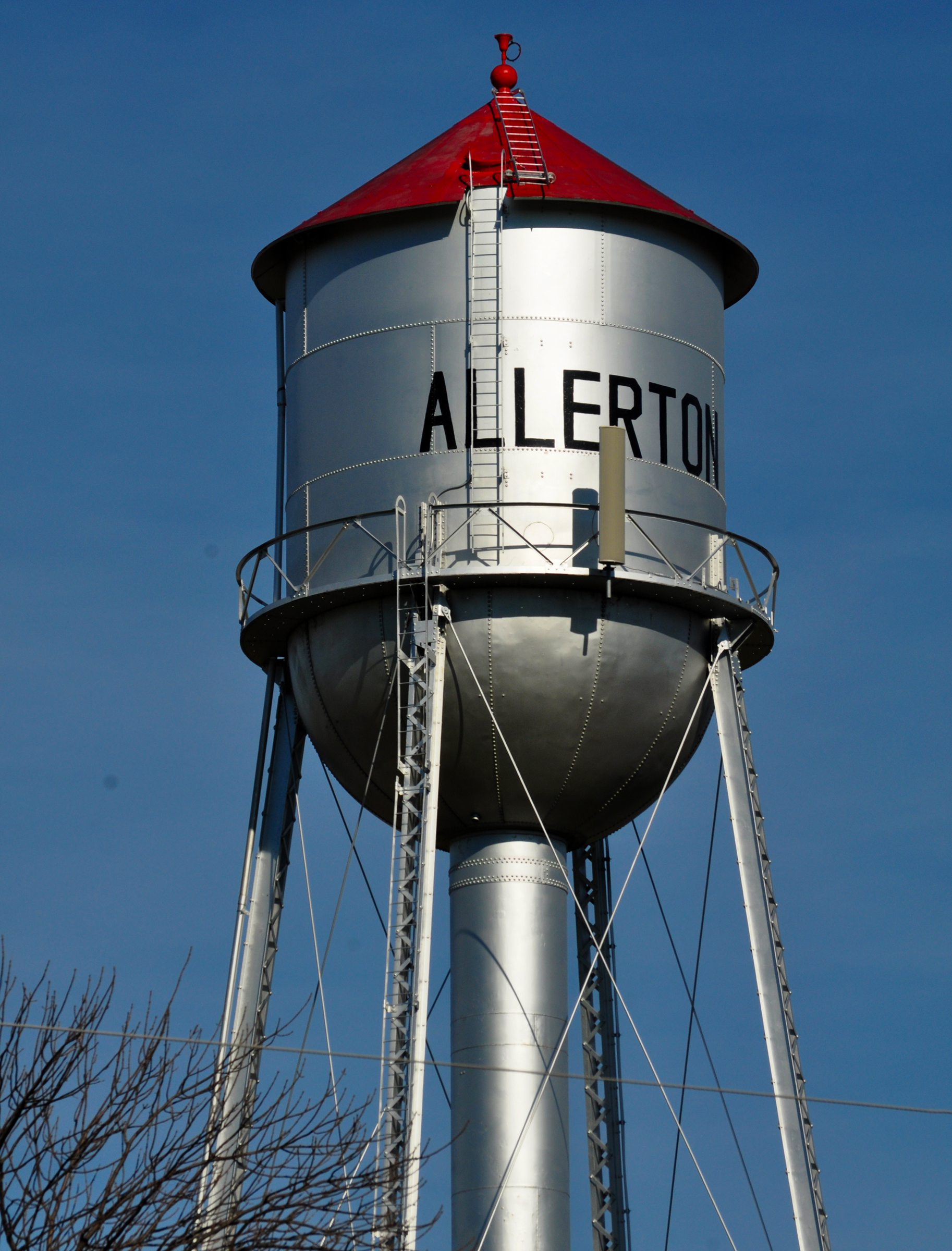
- Allerton water tower

- Location of Allerton, Iowa
- Coordinates: 40°42′27″N 93°22′20″W
- Country: USA
- State: Iowa
- County: Wayne

Area
  - Total: 1.19 sq mi (3.08 km^{2})
  - Land: 1.19 sq mi (3.08 km^{2})
  - Water: 0 sq mi (0.00 km^{2})
- Elevation: 1,099 ft (335 m)

Population (2020)
  - Total: 430
  - Density: 362.2/sq mi (139.84/km^{2})
- Time zone: UTC-6 (Central (CST))
  - Summer (DST): UTC-5 (CDT)
- ZIP code: 50008
- Area code: 641
- FIPS code: 19-01270
- GNIS feature ID: 2393922
- Website: www.townofallerton.org

Allerton is a city in Wayne County, Iowa. The population was 430 at the time of the 2020 census.

== Geography ==
According to the United States Census Bureau, the city has a total area of 1.14 square miles (2.95 km^{2}), all land. Allerton reservoir and Bob White State Park are located approximately three miles west of Allerton.

== Transportation ==
Allerton was served by Iowa Highway 40 until it was turned over to Wayne County and made a county road. There is a network of paved farm to market roads starting in Allerton and connecting with the surrounding towns.

Allerton was a division point on the Chicago, Rock Island and Pacific Railroad until the bankruptcy of the line in 1980. The old Golden State Route that ran east from Allerton through Seymour, Fairfield and Chicago was then abandoned. There had been some talk of relaying the track from Allerton to Seymour on the old Rock Island right of way to provide a connection between the Canadian Pacific (old Milwaukee Road) and the Union Pacific. This idea has since been dropped due to the objections of the adjacent landowners. The remaining line is now known as Union Pacific's Spine Line. It was purchased by the Chicago & Northwestern after the bankruptcy as a direct line between Kansas City and Minneapolis. It has seen a marked increase in traffic since the Chicago & Northwestern merger with Union Pacific. The last passenger train on the old Rock Island system through Allerton was the Plainsman from Kansas City to Des Moines and Minneapolis. It was discontinued in 1970.

== History ==
Allerton was platted by the Rock Island Railroad when it came through the area in 1870. It became a legal town in 1874 and had a peak population of 1,600 in 1913. Allerton and Corydon were rivals for the Wayne County seat. On several occasions, during the early establishment of the two towns, county records were moved back and forth, sometimes illegally, before Corydon was declared the county seat.

The southeastern side of the town was heavily damaged by an EF2 tornado on March 5, 2022.

== Demographics ==
Historical populations
Year	Pop.	±%
1880	888	—
1890	807	−9.1%
1900	950	+17.7%
1910	862	−9.3%
1920	954	+10.7%
1930	784	−17.8%
1940	782	−0.3%
1950	761	−2.7%
1960	692	−9.1%
1970	643	−7.1%
1980	670	+4.2%
1990	599	−10.6%
2000	559	−6.7%
2010	501	−10.4%
2020	430	−14.2%
Source:"U.S. Census website". United States Census Bureau. and Iowa Data Center; Source: U.S. Decennial Census

=== 2020 census ===
As of the census of 2020, there were 430 people, 197 households, and 119 families residing in the city. The population density was 362.2 inhabitants per square mile (139.8/km^{2}). There were 230 housing units at an average density of 193.7 per square mile (74.8/km^{2}). The racial makeup of the city was 97.4% White, 0.0% Black or African American, 0.0% Native American, 0.5% Asian, 0.0% Pacific Islander, 0.0% from other races and 2.1% from two or more races. Hispanic or Latino persons of any race comprised 0.7% of the population.

Of the 197 households, 31.5% of which had children under the age of 18 living with them, 40.6% were married couples living together, 7.1% were cohabitating couples, 33.5% had a female householder with no spouse or partner present and 18.8% had a male householder with no spouse or partner present. 39.6% of all households were non-families. 33.5% of all households were made up of individuals, 14.7% had someone living alone who was 65 years old or older.

The median age in the city was 39.8 years. 27.0% of the residents were under the age of 20; 2.1% were between the ages of 20 and 24; 26.0% were from 25 and 44; 25.3% were from 45 and 64; and 19.5% were 65 years of age or older. The gender makeup of the city was 48.4% male and 51.6% female.

=== 2010 census ===
As of the census of 2010, there were 501 people, 217 households, and 146 families living in the city. The population density was 439.5 inhabitants per square mile (169.7/km^{2}). There were 250 housing units at an average density of 219.3 per square mile (84.7/km^{2}). The racial makeup of the city was 99.2% White, 0.2% Native American, and 0.6% from two or more races. Hispanic or Latino of any race were 0.2% of the population.

There were 217 households, of which 28.1% had children under the age of 18 living with them, 52.1% were married couples living together, 10.1% had a female householder with no husband present, 5.1% had a male householder with no wife present, and 32.7% were non-families. 28.1% of all households were made up of individuals, and 13.4% had someone living alone who was 65 years of age or older. The average household size was 2.31 and the average family size was 2.77.

The median age in the city was 44.6 years. 21.6% of residents were under the age of 18; 6.2% were between the ages of 18 and 24; 23% were from 25 to 44; 31.6% were from 45 to 64; and 17.8% were 65 years of age or older. The gender makeup of the city was 47.9% male and 52.1% female.

=== 2000 census ===
As of the census of 2000, there were 559 people, 231 households, and 155 families living in the city. The population density was 490.4 inhabitants per square mile (189.3/km^{2}). There were 287 housing units at an average density of 251.8 per square mile (97.2/km^{2}). The racial makeup of the city was 99.28% White, 0.18% Asian, and 0.54% from two or more races. Hispanic or Latino of any race were 0.89% of the population.

There were 231 households, out of which 34.6% had children under the age of 18 living with them, 51.9% were married couples living together, 12.1% had a female householder with no husband present, and 32.5% were non-families. 30.7% of all households were made up of individuals, and 17.3% had someone living alone who was 65 years of age or older. The average household size was 2.42 and the average family size was 2.99.

27.5% are under the age of 18, 5.9% from 18 to 24, 26.8% from 25 to 44, 23.3% from 45 to 64, and 16.5% who were 65 years of age or older. The median age was 38 years. For every 100 females, there were 94.8 males. For every 100 females age 18 and over, there were 91.9 males.

The median income for a household in the city was $28,929, and the median income for a family was $35,000. Males had a median income of $23,854 versus $17,614 for females. The per capita income for the city was $12,218. About 17.6% of families and 18.5% of the population were below the poverty line, including 23.5% of those under age 18 and 15.0% of those age 65 or over.

== Education ==
The Allerton–Lineville–Clio School District formed upon the consolidation of Allerton, Clio, and Lineville school districts, which occurred between 1962 and 1966. In 1966, Allerton de-merged and merged into the Cambria-Corydon School District to become Wayne County Community School District in 1967, while the remaining district became the Lineville–Clio Community School District.

The Wayne Community School District operated public schools serving the community. Kindergarten and the lower elementary grades for the Allerton children continued to be held in the Allerton school along with seventh and eight grade for the entire Wayne Community School District beginning in 1967. This arrangement continued until the Allerton School building was deemed deficient and all classes are now held in Corydon.
