= Kirby Park (disambiguation) =

Kirby Park is an urban park in Wilkes-Barre, Pennsylvania.

Kirby Park may also refer to:

- Kirby Park (Aspley), a sports venue for the Aspley Broncos
- Kirby Park (country house), a country house in Kirby Bellars
- Kirby Park railway station, a railway station named for the park around Kirbymount
- Kirby Park (California), a park on Elkhorn Slough
- Kirby Park (Cambria), a park in Cambria, Iowa
- Kirby Park (Houston), a park in River Oaks, Houston, Texas
- Kirby Park (Illinois), a park in Hall Township, Bureau County, Illinois
- Kirby Stud Park, an equestrian facility used by Grace Bowman
