= Burrell Township =

Burrell Township may refer to the following townships in the United States:

- Burrell Township, Decatur County, Iowa
- Burrell Township, Armstrong County, Pennsylvania
- Burrell Township, Indiana County, Pennsylvania
