= Garden Grove Township, Decatur County, Iowa =

Garden Grove Township
- Township
- Location in Decatur County
- Coordinates: 40°51′29″N 93°36′56″W
- Country: United States
- State: Iowa
- County: Decatur

Area
  - Total: 35.73 sq mi (92.55 km^{2})
  - Land: 35.69 sq mi (92.43 km^{2})
  - Water: 0.042 sq mi (0.11 km^{2}) 0.12%
- Elevation: 1,070 ft (326 m)

Population (2000)
  - Total: 428
  - Density: 12/sq mi (4.6/km^{2})
- GNIS feature ID: 0467889

Garden Grove Township is a township in Decatur County, Iowa, United States. As of the 2000 census, its population was 428.

== History ==
Garden Grove Township was created in 1850.

== Geography ==
Garden Grove Township covers an area of 35.73 square miles (92.5 km^{2}); of this, 0.04 square miles (0.10 km^{2}) or 0.12 percent is water. The streams of Mormon Pool and Weldon Creek run through this township.

=== Cities and towns ===
- Le Roy
- Garden Grove

=== Adjacent townships ===
- Franklin Township, Clarke County (north)
- Union Township, Lucas County (northeast)
- Richman Township, Wayne County (east)
- High Point Township (south)
- Center Township (southwest)
- Franklin Township (west)
- Green Bay Township, Clarke County (northwest)

=== Cemeteries ===
The township contains five cemeteries: Doze, Garden Grove, Metier, Morman and Winters.
