= Wayne County Courthouse =

Wayne County Courthouse may refer to:

- Wayne County Courthouse (Georgia), Jesup, Georgia, listed on the National Register of Historic Places (NRHP)
- Wayne County Courthouse (Illinois), in Fairfield, Illinois, built in 1890s
- Wayne County Courthouse (Indiana), in Richmond, Indiana, 1893-built, NRHP-listed
- Wayne County Courthouse (Iowa), in Corydon, Iowa
- Wayne County Building, Detroit, Michigan, formerly known as Wayne County Courthouse, NRHP-listed
- Wayne County Courthouse (Nebraska), in Wayne, Nebraska, 1899-built and NRHP-listed
- Wayne County Courthouse District, in Wooster, Ohio, 1879-built and NRHP-listed
- Wayne County Courthouse (Tennessee), Waynesboro, Tennessee, NRHP-listed
