= Cozad =

Cozad may refer to:

- Cozad, Nebraska, city
- Adam Cozad, screenwriter
- Amy Cozad (born 1991), American diver
- Irene Cozad (1888–1970), American pianist
- Kyle Cozad, military officer

== See also ==
- Cozad–Bates House, historic building in Ohio
- Cozad Singers, drum group
