= Terre Haute, Iowa =

- Unincorporated community
- Location within Iowa
- Coordinates: 40°41′00″N 93°52′00″W
- Country: United States
- State: Iowa
- County: Decatur
- Elevation: 928 ft (283 m)
- Time zone: UTC-6 (Central (CST))
  - Summer (DST): UTC-5 (CDT)
- Area code: 641
- GNIS feature ID: 462197

Terre Haute is an unincorporated community in Burrell Township, Decatur County, Iowa, United States. Terre Haute is located along County Highway R30, 5.5 miles (8.9 km) northeast of Lamoni.
