= Warren Township, Wayne County, Iowa =

Township in Wayne County, Iowa

Coordinates: 40.681°N 93.385°W

Warren Township is a township in Wayne County, Iowa, USA.

== History ==
Warren Township is named for General Joseph Warren. It composes an area of 525 square miles (1,360 km^{2}).
