= Center Township, Decatur County, Iowa =

Center Township
- Township
- Location in Decatur County
- Coordinates: 40°46′31″N 93°43′36″W
- Country: United States
- State: Iowa
- County: Decatur

Area
  - Total: 33.10 sq mi (85.74 km^{2})
  - Land: 32.69 sq mi (84.66 km^{2})
  - Water: 0.42 sq mi (1.08 km^{2}) 1.26%
- Elevation: 1,122 ft (342 m)

Population (2000)
  - Total: 317
  - Density: 9.6/sq mi (3.7/km^{2})
- GNIS feature ID: 0467573

Center Township is a township in Decatur County, Iowa, United States. As of the 2000 census, its population was 317.

== Geography ==
Center Township covers an area of 33.11 square miles (85.74 square kilometers); of this, 0.42 square miles (1.08 square kilometers) or 1.26 percent is water. The stream of West Little River runs through this township. The community of Leon is located in the southwest quadrant of the township. Leon became the county seat in 1853, then separated politically from the township by incorporating as a city in 1858.

=== Adjacent townships ===
- Franklin Township (north)
- Garden Grove Township (northeast)
- High Point Township (east)
- Woodland Township (southeast)
- Eden Township (south)
- Burrell Township (southwest)
- Decatur Township (west)
- Long Creek Township (northwest)

=== Cemeteries ===
The township contains one cemetery, Franklin.

=== Major highways ===
- U.S. Route 69

=== Airports and landing strips ===
- Decatur County Hospital Heliport
- McMillian Field
