= Seymour Community School District =

Public school district in Seymour, Iowa, United States

Coordinates: 40.680748°N 93.116074°W

Location
- Seymour, Iowa Wayne and Appanoose counties United States
- Coordinates: 40.680748, -93.116074

District information
- Type: Public
- Grades: K–12
- Superintendent: Scott Valentine
- Schools: 2
- Budget: $4,962,000 (2020-21)
- NCES District ID: 1925620

Students and staff
- Students: 223 (2022-23)
- Teachers: 26.54 FTE
- Staff: 33.16 FTE
- Student–teacher ratio: 8.40
- Athletic conference: Bluegrass
- District mascot: Warriors
- Colors: Red and Black

Other information
- Website: www.seymourcsd.org

The Seymour Community School District is a rural public school district headquartered in Seymour, Iowa.

The district spans western Appanoose County and eastern Wayne County. The district serves the city of Seymour, the towns of Promise City, Plano, the hamlet of Jerome, and surrounding rural areas. A portion of Numa extends into the Seymour district.

== Schools ==
The district operates two schools in a single facility at 100 South Park in Seymour:

- Seymour Elementary School
- Seymour High School

== Seymour High School ==
=== Athletics ===
The school's mascot is the Warriors. Their colors are red and black. The Warriors compete in the Bluegrass Conference, including the following sports:

- Volleyball
- Football (8-man)
- Basketball (boys and girls)
- Track and Field (boys and girls)
- Baseball
- Softball

== See also ==
- List of school districts in Iowa
- List of high schools in Iowa
