= New Buda Township, Decatur County, Iowa =

New Buda Township
- Township
- Location in Decatur County
- Coordinates: 40°36′38″N 93°50′40″W
- Country: United States
- State: Iowa
- County: Decatur

Area
  - Total: 25.28 sq mi (65.47 km^{2})
  - Land: 25.19 sq mi (65.24 km^{2})
  - Water: 0.089 sq mi (0.23 km^{2}) 0.35%
- Elevation: 938 ft (286 m)

Population (2000)
  - Total: 270
  - Density: 11/sq mi (4.1/km^{2})
- GNIS feature ID: 0468429

New Buda Township is a township in Decatur County, Iowa, United States. As of the 2000 census, its population was 270.

== History ==
The name New Buda is derived from Buda, now the part of Budapest, given by the Hungarian and Romanian immigrants who settled there.

== Geography ==
New Buda Township covers an area of 25.28 square miles (65.47 square kilometers); of this, 0.09 square miles (0.23 square kilometers) or 0.35 percent, is water. The stream of Dickersons Branch runs through this township.

=== Cities and towns ===
- Davis City (southwest quarter)

=== Unincorporated towns ===
- New Buda
- Togo (historical)

(This list is based on USGS data and may include former settlements.)

=== Adjacent townships ===
- Burrell Township (north)
- Eden Township (northeast)
- Hamilton Township (east)
- Fayette Township (west)
- Lamoni Township (west)
- Bloomington Township (northwest)

=== Cemeteries ===
The township contains two cemeteries: Creveling and New Buda.

=== Major highways ===
- Interstate 35
- U.S. Route 69

== See also ==
- George Pomutz
