= Wayne County, Iowa =

County in Iowa, United States

- County
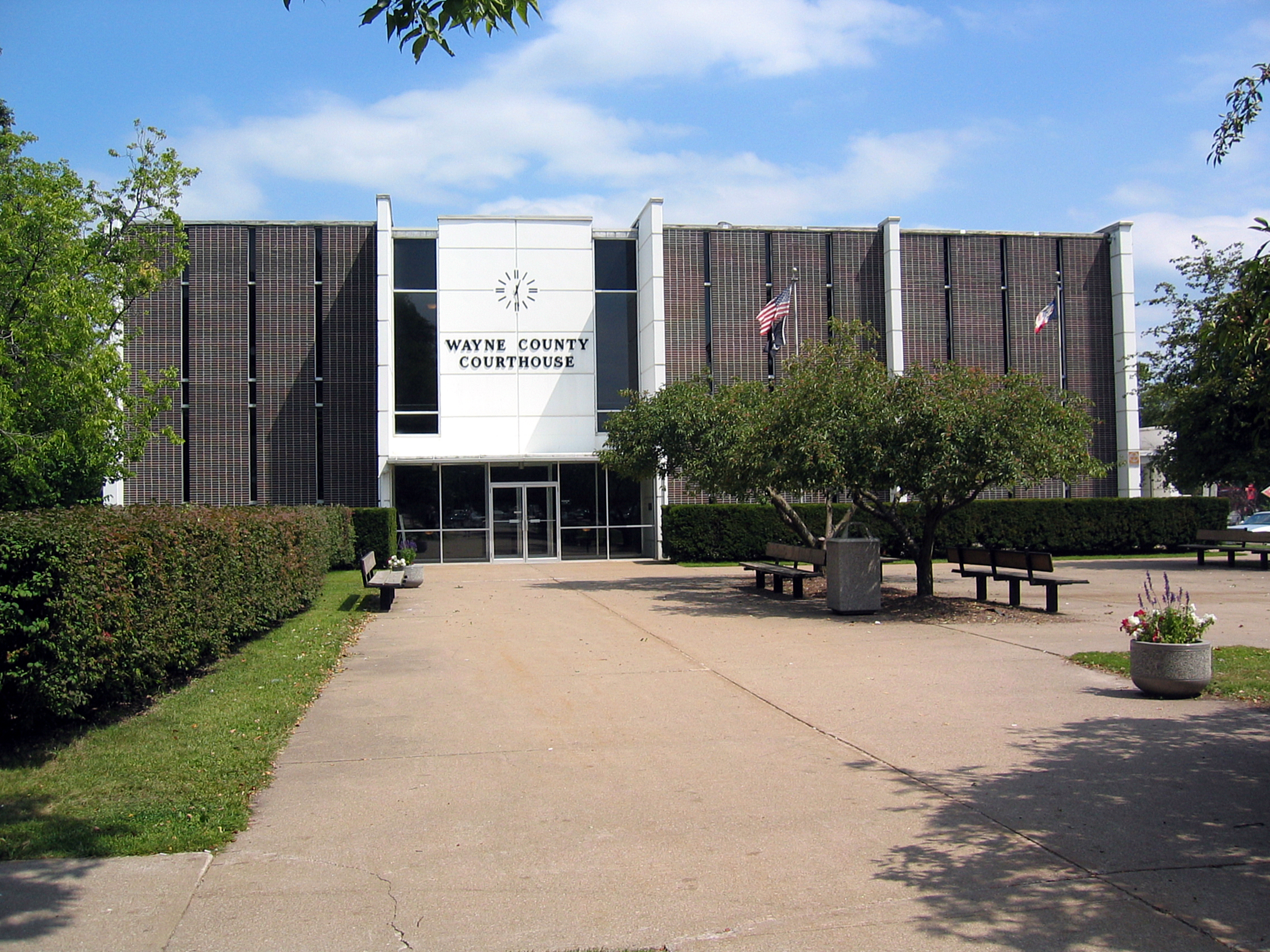
- The Wayne County Courthouse in Corydon

- Location within the U.S. state of Iowa
- Coordinates: 40.739983°N 93.332613°W
- Country: United States
- State: Iowa
- Created: January 13, 1846
- Organized: January 27, 1851
- Named for: Anthony Wayne
- Seat: Corydon
- Largest city: Corydon

Area
  - Total: 527.119 sq mi (1,365.23 km^{2})
  - Land: 525.469 sq mi (1,360.96 km^{2})
  - Water: 1.650 sq mi (4.27 km^{2}) 0.31%

Population (2020)
  - Total: 6,497
  - Estimate (2025): 6,738 ▲
  - Density: 12.8/sq mi (4.9/km^{2})
- Time zone: UTC−6 (Central)
  - Summer (DST): UTC−5 (CDT)
- Area code: 641
- Congressional district: 3rd
- Website: waynecounty.iowa.gov
- Iowa county number 93

Wayne County is a county located in the U.S. state of Iowa. As of the 2020 census, the population was 6,497, making it the sixth-least populous county in Iowa. The county seat and the largest city is Corydon.

== History ==
Wayne County was formed in 1846 but was still attached to other counties for governmental purposes. It was named after General Anthony Wayne.

Its southern border with Missouri was uncertain until the states got a decision from the US Supreme Court in 1848 which held the 1816 Sullivan line (re-marked in 1850), originally run as the northern boundary of an Osage Indian cession. This line is not a true east–west line so the county does not have an exactly rectangular shape.

There had been settlement in this county as early as 1841 by persons thinking they were in Missouri, but the first settlers intending to be in Iowa came in about 1848. Its government was organized and the county seat was selected in 1851.

== Geography ==
According to the United States Census Bureau, the county has a total area of 527 square miles (1,360 km^{2}), of which 525 square miles (1,360 km^{2}) is land and 1.7 square miles (4.4 km^{2}) (0.31%) is water.

=== Major highways ===
- U.S. Highway 65
- Iowa Highway 2
- Iowa Highway 14

=== Adjacent counties ===
- Lucas County (north)
- Appanoose County (east)
- Putnam County, Missouri (southeast)
- Mercer County, Missouri (southwest)
- Decatur County (west)

== Demographics ==
Historical population
Census	Pop.	Note	%±
1850	340		—
1860	6,409		1,785.0%
1870	11,287		76.1%
1880	16,127		42.9%
1890	15,670		−2.8%
1900	17,491		11.6%
1910	16,184		−7.5%
1920	15,378		−5.0%
1930	13,787		−10.3%
1940	13,308		−3.5%
1950	11,737		−11.8%
1960	9,800		−16.5%
1970	8,405		−14.2%
1980	8,199		−2.5%
1990	7,067		−13.8%
2000	6,730		−4.8%
2010	6,403		−4.9%
2020	6,497		1.5%
2025 (est.)	6,738	▲	3.7%
U.S. Decennial Census:

=== 2020 census ===
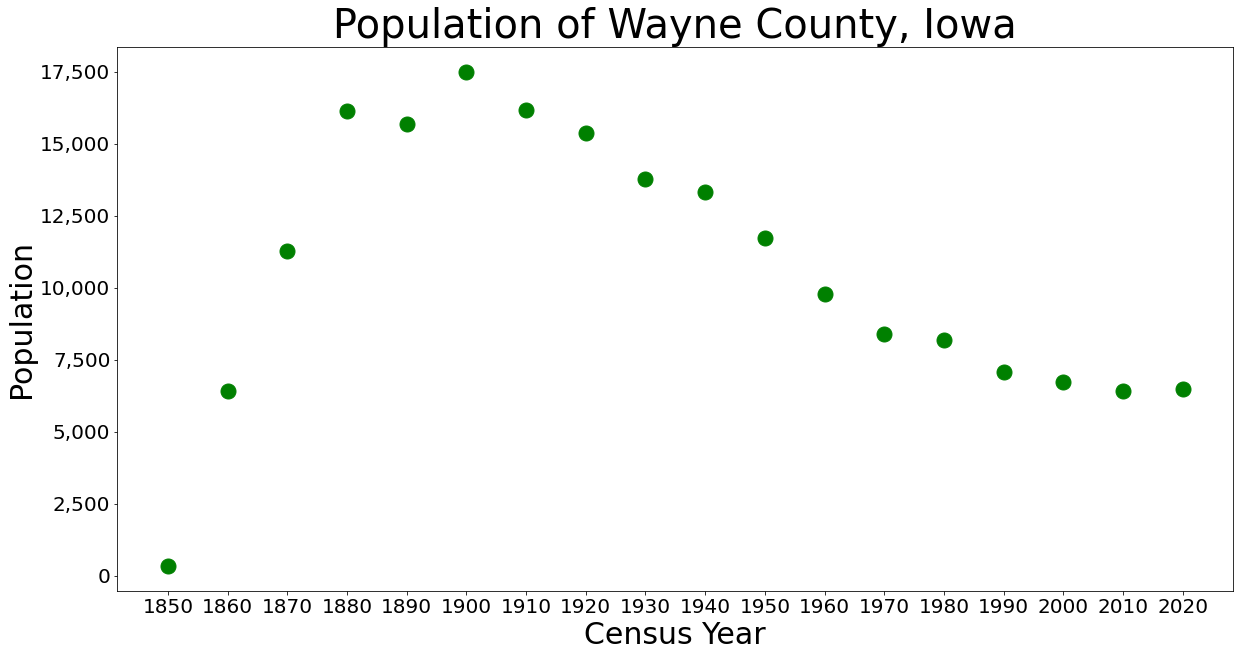
Population of Wayne County from the U.S. census data

As of the 2020 census, the county had a population of 6,497 and a population density of 12.4/sq mi (4.8/km^{2}).

The median age was 40.3 years, 26.2% of residents were under the age of 18, and 21.1% were 65 years of age or older. For every 100 females there were 96.8 males, and for every 100 females age 18 and over there were 94.4 males.

97.38% of the population reported being of one race. The racial makeup of the county was 96.4% White, 0.2% Black or African American, 0.3% American Indian and Alaska Native, 0.4% Asian, <0.1% Native Hawaiian and Pacific Islander, 0.2% from some other race, and 2.6% from two or more races. Hispanic or Latino residents of any race comprised 0.9% of the population.

<0.1% of residents lived in urban areas, while 100.0% lived in rural areas.

There were 2,585 households in the county, of which 28.2% had children under the age of 18 living in them. Of all households, 51.5% were married-couple households, 18.9% were households with a male householder and no spouse or partner present, and 24.0% were households with a female householder and no spouse or partner present. About 30.3% of all households were made up of individuals and 15.2% had someone living alone who was 65 years of age or older.

There were 3,025 housing units, of which 2,585 were occupied; 14.5% of the housing units were vacant. Among occupied units, 78.5% were owner-occupied and 21.5% were renter-occupied. The homeowner vacancy rate was 1.9% and the rental vacancy rate was 7.2%.

=== 2010 census ===
As of the 2010 census recorded a population of 6,403 in the county, with a population density of 12.2/sq mi (4.7/km^{2}). There were 3,212 housing units, of which 2,652 were occupied.

=== 2000 census ===
As of the 2000 census, there were 6,730 people, 2,821 households, and 1,918 families residing in the county. The population density was 13 people per square mile (5.0 people/km^{2}). There were 3,357 housing units at an average density of 6 units per square mile (2.3 units/km^{2}). The racial makeup of the county was 98.78% White, 0.06% Black or African American, 0.12% Native American, 0.15% Asian, 0.06% Pacific Islander, 0.19% from other races, and 0.64% from two or more races. 0.71% of the population were Hispanic or Latino of any race.

There were 2,821 households, out of which 27.30% had children under the age of 18 living with them, 58.20% were married couples living together, 6.40% had a female householder with no husband present, and 32.00% were non-families. 29.80% of all households were made up of individuals, and 17.90% had someone living alone who was 65 years of age or older. The average household size was 2.34 and the average family size was 2.89.

In the county, the population was spread out, with 23.90% under the age of 18, 5.90% from 18 to 24, 23.40% from 25 to 44, 23.00% from 45 to 64, and 23.80% who were 65 years of age or older. The median age was 43 years. For every 100 females there were 91.70 males. For every 100 females age 18 and over, there were 90.80 males.

The median income for a household in the county was $29,380, and the median income for a family was $35,534. Males had a median income of $26,018 versus $18,310 for females. The per capita income for the county was $15,613. About 10.80% of families and 14.00% of the population were below the poverty line, including 17.20% of those under age 18 and 14.20% of those age 65 or over.

== Religion ==
Religion in Wayne County, according to ARDA (2020)
1. Mainline Protestant churches (18.4%)
2. Anabaptist churches (Amish) (14.8%)
3. Evangelical churches (11.4%)
4. Catholic Church (0.90%)
5. None* (54.5%)

See chart; "None" is an unclear category. It is a heterogenous group of the not religious and intermittently religious. Researchers argue that most of the "Nones" should be considered "unchurched", rather than objectively nonreligious, especially since most "Nones" do hold some religious-spiritual beliefs and a notable amount participate in religious behaviors. For example, 72% of American "Nones" believe in God or a higher power.

== Communities ==
=== Cities ===
- Allerton
- Clio
- Corydon
- Humeston
- Lineville
- Millerton
- Promise City
- Seymour

=== Unincorporated communities ===
- Cambria
- Confidence
- Harvard
- New York
- Sewal

=== Ghost town ===
- Big Spring

=== Townships ===
- Benton
- Clay
- Clinton
- Corydon
- Grand River
- Howard
- Jackson
- Jefferson
- Monroe
- Richman
- South Fork
- Union
- Walnut
- Warren
- Washington
- Wright

=== Population ranking ===
The population ranking of the following table is based on the 2020 census of Wayne County.

† denotes county seat.

Rank	City/town/etc.	Municipal type	Population (2020 Census)
1	† Corydon	City	1,526
2	Seymour	City	634
3	Humeston	City	465
4	Allerton	City	430
5	Lineville	City	195
6	Promise City	City	88
7	Clio	City	67
8	Millerton	City	36

== Politics ==
Formerly a moderate county, Wayne has become staunchly Republican since Donald Trump's first run for president in 2016.

United States presidential election results for Wayne County, Iowa
Year	Republican		Democratic		Third party(ies)	
Year	No.	%	No.	%	No.	%
1896	2,101	48.93%	2,115	49.25%	78	1.82%
1900	2,294	51.78%	2,001	45.17%	135	3.05%
1904	2,290	56.11%	1,452	35.58%	339	8.31%
1908	2,092	52.09%	1,756	43.73%	168	4.18%
1912	1,193	31.64%	1,581	41.93%	997	26.44%
1916	1,936	48.68%	1,935	48.65%	106	2.67%
1920	4,234	62.51%	2,434	35.94%	105	1.55%
1924	3,322	49.97%	1,826	27.47%	1,500	22.56%
1928	3,911	59.46%	2,579	39.21%	88	1.34%
1932	2,311	36.52%	3,896	61.57%	121	1.91%
1936	3,609	48.43%	3,778	50.70%	65	0.87%
1940	3,748	50.64%	3,625	48.98%	28	0.38%
1944	3,098	50.31%	3,025	49.12%	35	0.57%
1948	2,738	44.72%	3,314	54.12%	71	1.16%
1952	3,995	61.23%	2,497	38.27%	33	0.51%
1956	3,340	56.64%	2,553	43.29%	4	0.07%
1960	3,401	59.51%	2,307	40.37%	7	0.12%
1964	1,994	39.39%	3,062	60.49%	6	0.12%
1968	2,553	55.83%	1,723	37.68%	297	6.49%
1972	2,681	62.00%	1,574	36.40%	69	1.60%
1976	1,781	44.58%	2,145	53.69%	69	1.73%
1980	2,221	54.12%	1,627	39.64%	256	6.24%
1984	2,061	51.26%	1,927	47.92%	33	0.82%
1988	1,467	42.19%	1,988	57.18%	22	0.63%
1992	1,299	36.24%	1,632	45.54%	653	18.22%
1996	1,295	39.64%	1,650	50.51%	322	9.86%
2000	1,666	55.15%	1,300	43.03%	55	1.82%
2004	1,733	55.31%	1,379	44.02%	21	0.67%
2008	1,565	52.50%	1,357	45.52%	59	1.98%
2012	1,583	54.59%	1,251	43.14%	66	2.28%
2016	2,069	70.37%	719	24.46%	152	5.17%
2020	2,338	75.20%	727	23.38%	44	1.42%
2024	2,426	77.66%	643	20.58%	55	1.76%

== Education ==
School districts include:

- Mormon Trail Community School District
- Seymour Community School District
- Wayne Community School District

Former school districts

- Lineville-Clio Community School District - merged into the Wayne district on July 1, 2011
- Russell Community School District - involuntarily dissolved on January 1, 2008

== See also ==
- National Register of Historic Places listings in Wayne County, Iowa
