= Woodland, Iowa =

- Unincorporated community
- Location within Iowa
- Coordinates: 40°41′46″N 93°35′53″W
- Country: United States
- State: Iowa
- County: Decatur
- Elevation: 1,086 ft (331 m)
- Time zone: UTC-6 (Central (CST))
  - Summer (DST): UTC-5 (CDT)
- Area code: 641
- GNIS feature ID: 463183

Woodland is an unincorporated community in Woodland Township, Decatur County, Iowa, United States. Woodland is located at the intersection of county highways J46 and R69, 8.4 miles (13.5 km) east-southeast of Leon.

== History ==
Woodland's population was 78 in 1902, and was 79 in 1925. The population was 50 in 1940.
