= New Buda, Iowa =

- Former unincorporated community
- Location within Iowa
- Coordinates: 40°36′05″N 93°48′38″W
- Country: United States
- State: Iowa
- County: Decatur
- Elevation: 928 ft (283 m)
- Time zone: UTC-6 (Central (CST))
  - Summer (DST): UTC-5 (CDT)
- Area code: 641
- GNIS feature ID: 1822764

New Buda was an unincorporated community in New Buda Township, Decatur County, Iowa, United States. New Buda was located along 270th Avenue, 2.6 miles (4.2 km) south of Davis City.

== History ==
New Buda was founded as a Hungarian settlement in the summer of 1850 by László Újházi. Újházi hoped to colonize the area with German-speaking Hungarians fleeing the revolution in Hungary. The New Buda post office opened that fall, with Újházi listed as postmaster. The townsite was platted in 1851. According to Vassady (1991), Hungarian settlers "came to the incipient colony during its first two years, but few remained permanently."

Although more than 100 emigres planned to settle the New Buda area, the community remained small. The hardships of pioneer life proved too much for the settlers. The Hungarians' "experience managing developed estates in Hungary was of little help in breaking prairie soil or in the use of survival techniques until the first crops came in." The Hungarian settlers gradually left New Buda, some moving to Davenport, where Hungarians had already settled.

Between 1853 and 1858, New Buda had around 70-80 residents, with eight houses along the Grand River. But by the 1870s, the community was in decline. The Ausgleich of 1867 had granted amnesty to the Hungarians, and many of them returned to Austria-Hungary, while others fought in the American Civil War. By 1875, the New Buda schoolhouse was abandoned; Ignác Hainer, the last postmaster, recommended the closure of the post office in 1880.
