= Clinton Township, Wayne County, Iowa =

Township in Wayne County, Iowa, U.S.

Coordinates: 40.6161°N 93.3819°W

Clinton Township is a township in Wayne County, Iowa, United States.

== History ==
Clinton Township is named for DeWitt Clinton.
