= New York, Iowa =

- Ghost town
- Location within Iowa Location within the United States
- Coordinates: 40°51′06″N 93°15′36″W
- Country: United States
- State: Iowa
- County: Wayne
- Elevation: 1,056 ft (322 m)
- Time zone: UTC-6 (Central (CST))
  - Summer (DST): UTC-5 (CDT)
- Area code: 641
- GNIS feature ID: 459496

New York is a former town in Wayne County, in the U.S. state of Iowa. It was located at 40°51′06″N 93°15′36″W.

== History ==
A post office called New York was established in 1856 and remained in operation until 1903. The community was named after the state of New York. Old maps show two churches and a school as well as other buildings, but none of these structures still stand.
