= High Point, Iowa =

- Unincorporated community
- Location within Iowa
- Coordinates: 40°45′40″N 93°35′40″W
- Country: United States
- State: Iowa
- County: Decatur
- Elevation: 1,099 ft (335 m)
- Time zone: UTC-6 (Central (CST))
  - Summer (DST): UTC-5 (CDT)
- Area code: 641
- GNIS feature ID: 464578

High Point is an unincorporated community in High Point Township, Decatur County, Iowa, United States. High Point is located along Iowa Highway 2, 8.2 miles (13.2 km) east of Leon.

== History ==
High Point's population was 31 in 1925. The population was 25 in 1940.
