= Franklin Township, Decatur County, Iowa =

Franklin Township
- Township
- Location in Decatur County
- Coordinates: 40°51′21″N 93°43′48″W
- Country: United States
- State: Iowa
- County: Decatur

Area
  - Total: 36.19 sq mi (93.74 km^{2})
  - Land: 36.17 sq mi (93.67 km^{2})
  - Water: 0.027 sq mi (0.07 km^{2}) 0.07%
- Elevation: 1,096 ft (334 m)

Population (2000)
  - Total: 370
  - Density: 10/sq mi (4/km^{2})
- GNIS feature ID: 0467853

Franklin Township is a township in Decatur County, Iowa, United States. As of the 2000 census, its population was 370.

== Geography ==
Franklin Township covers an area of 36.19 square miles (93.74 square kilometers); of this, 0.03 square miles (0.07 square kilometers) or 0.07 percent is water.

=== Cities and towns ===
- Weldon

=== Adjacent townships ===
- Green Bay Township, Clarke County (north)
- Franklin Township, Clarke County (northeast)
- Garden Grove Township (east)
- High Point Township (southeast)
- Center Township (south)
- Decatur Township (southwest)
- Long Creek Township (west)
- Knox Township, Clarke County (northwest)

=== Cemeteries ===
The township contains two cemeteries: Johnson and Kline.

=== Major highways ===
- U.S. Route 69
