= Big Spring, Iowa =

- Ghost town
- Location of Big Spring in Iowa Big Spring, Iowa (the United States)
- Coordinates: 40°41′00″N 93°31′37″W
- Country: USA
- County: Wayne
- Elevation: 324 m (1,063 ft)
- Time zone: UTC-6 (Central (CST))
  - Summer (DST): UTC-5 (CDT)
- GNIS feature ID: 464327

Big Spring is a ghost town located in Wayne County, Iowa, United States.

By 1887, several mineral springs had been located nearby.

The settlement had a post office from 1875 to 1901.

All that remains of the settlement is the Big Springs Cemetery.
