= Corydon Township, Wayne County, Iowa =

Township in Iowa, United States

Coordinates: 40.7681°N 93.2695°W

Corydon Township is a township in Wayne County, Iowa.

== History ==
Corydon Township was given its name by a county judge who hailed from Corydon, Indiana.
