= Lineville–Clio Community School District =

Former school district in Lineville, Iowa

Lineville–Clio Community School District (L-C) was a school district headquartered in Lineville, Iowa, United States. It served Lineville and Clio.

Its schools included Lineville Elementary School and Lineville High School.

== History ==
The district originated from a school built in Lineville in 1850. The ACL district, which had schools in Allerton and Lineville, formed with the consolidation of Clio, Lineville, and Allerton school districts, occurring between 1962 and 1966. Allerton de-merged from ACL and merged into the Wayne Community School District in 1967. The name was changed from ACL to Lineville–Clio on July 1, 1987.

In 1995, the district had 115 students, making it the school district in the state with the lowest enrollment, and sixteen faculty members who worked full time.

The final elementary school building of the district opened in 2004.

The district decided to wind down in 2010, with students moved to Wayne Community School District and/or Mormon Trail Community School District. Lineville Elementary was not closed at that time. The Lineville–Clio merger with Wayne was effective July 1, 2011.

== Operations ==
In 1995, it had an agreement with the Fremont Community School District and the Russell Community School District to have a single superintendent.

== Campus ==
Its school building was constructed of brick circa 1915. In 1995 Mark Siebert of the Des Moines Register described the school building as "decaying".

== Curriculum ==
In 1995, Lineville-Clio students taking Spanish classes did so at the North Mercer School District in Mercer, Missouri.

== Athletics ==
In 1995, students played on athletic teams at Mormon Trail High School in Humeston, Iowa, including its American football and volleyball teams.
