= Benton Township, Wayne County, Iowa =

Township in Wayne County, Iowa, U.S.

Coordinates: 40.7694°N 93.3914°W

Benton Township is a township in Wayne County, Iowa, USA.

== History ==
Benton Township is named for Missouri statesman Thomas Hart Benton.
