= Jackson Township, Wayne County, Iowa =

Township in Wayne County, Iowa, U.S.

Coordinates: 40°40′52″N 93°16′12″W

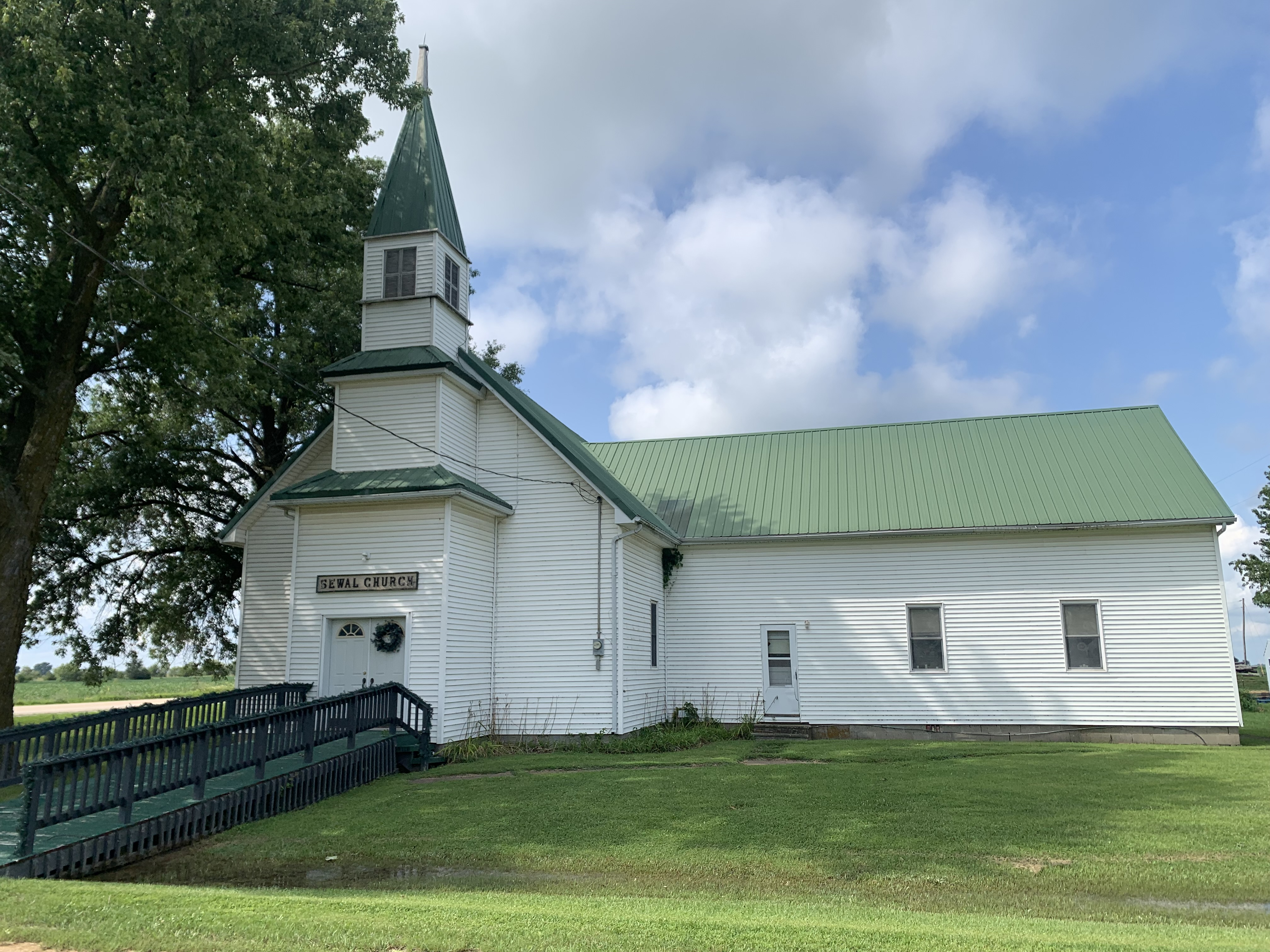
Sewal Church in Sewal, Iowa

Jackson Township is a township in Wayne County, Iowa, USA.

== History ==
Jackson Township is named for Andrew Jackson.
