= Hamilton Township, Decatur County, Iowa =

Hamilton Township
- Township
- Location in Decatur County
- Coordinates: 40°36′36″N 93°43′26″W
- Country: United States
- State: Iowa
- County: Decatur

Area
  - Total: 25.30 sq mi (65.53 km^{2})
  - Land: 25.16 sq mi (65.17 km^{2})
  - Water: 0.14 sq mi (0.35 km^{2}) 0.53%
- Elevation: 991 ft (302 m)

Population (2000)
  - Total: 180
  - Density: 7.3/sq mi (2.8/km^{2})
- GNIS feature ID: 0467991

Hamilton Township is a township in Decatur County, Iowa, United States. As of the 2000 census, its population was 180.

== History ==
Hamilton Township was created in 1850. It is named for county commissioner William Hamilton.

== Geography ==
Hamilton Township covers an area of 25.3 square miles (65.53 square kilometers); of this, 0.14 square miles (0.35 square kilometers) or 0.53 percent is water. The streams of Kilgore Creek and Marks Branch run through this township.

=== Cities and towns ===
- Pleasanton

=== Adjacent townships ===
- Eden Township (north)
- Woodland Township (northeast)
- Morgan Township (east)
- New Buda Township (west)
- Burrell Township (northwest)

=== Cemeteries ===
The township contains seven cemeteries: Campbell, Chase (historical), Cowles, Dale, Gammill, Hamilton and New Salem.
