= Cambria, Iowa =

- Unincorporated community
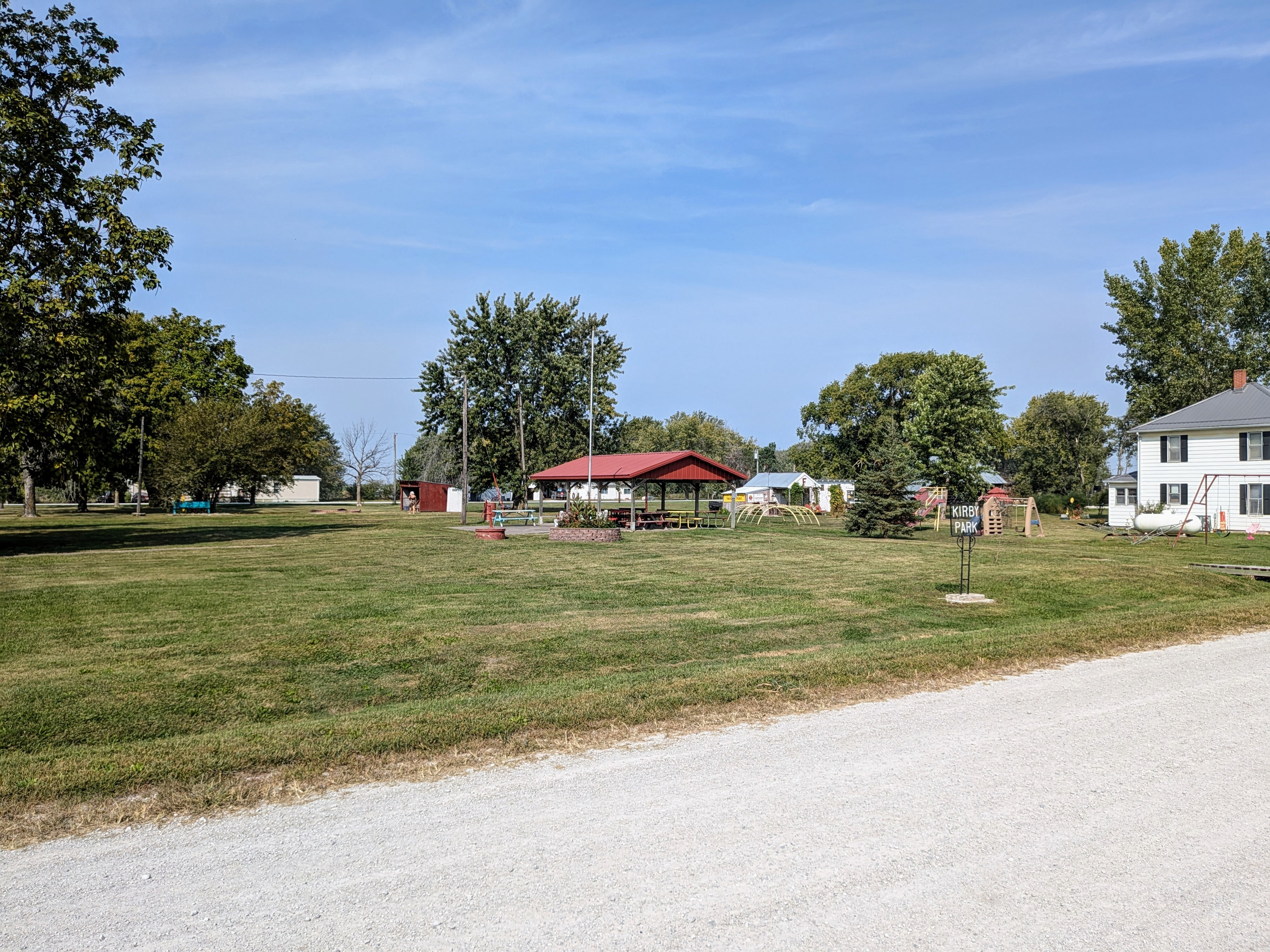
- Kirby Park in Cambria

- Location within Iowa
- Coordinates: 40°50′16″N 93°24′09″W
- Country: United States
- State: Iowa
- County: Wayne
- Elevation: 1,093 ft (333 m)
- Time zone: UTC-6 (Central (CST))
  - Summer (DST): UTC-5 (CDT)
- Area code: 641
- GNIS feature ID: 455097

Cambria is an unincorporated community in Washington Township, Wayne County, Iowa, United States. It has never been incorporated, but it has existed since 1849. Although Cambria had the first post office in the county, its post office has since been closed, and its residents now have rural Corydon addresses.

== History ==
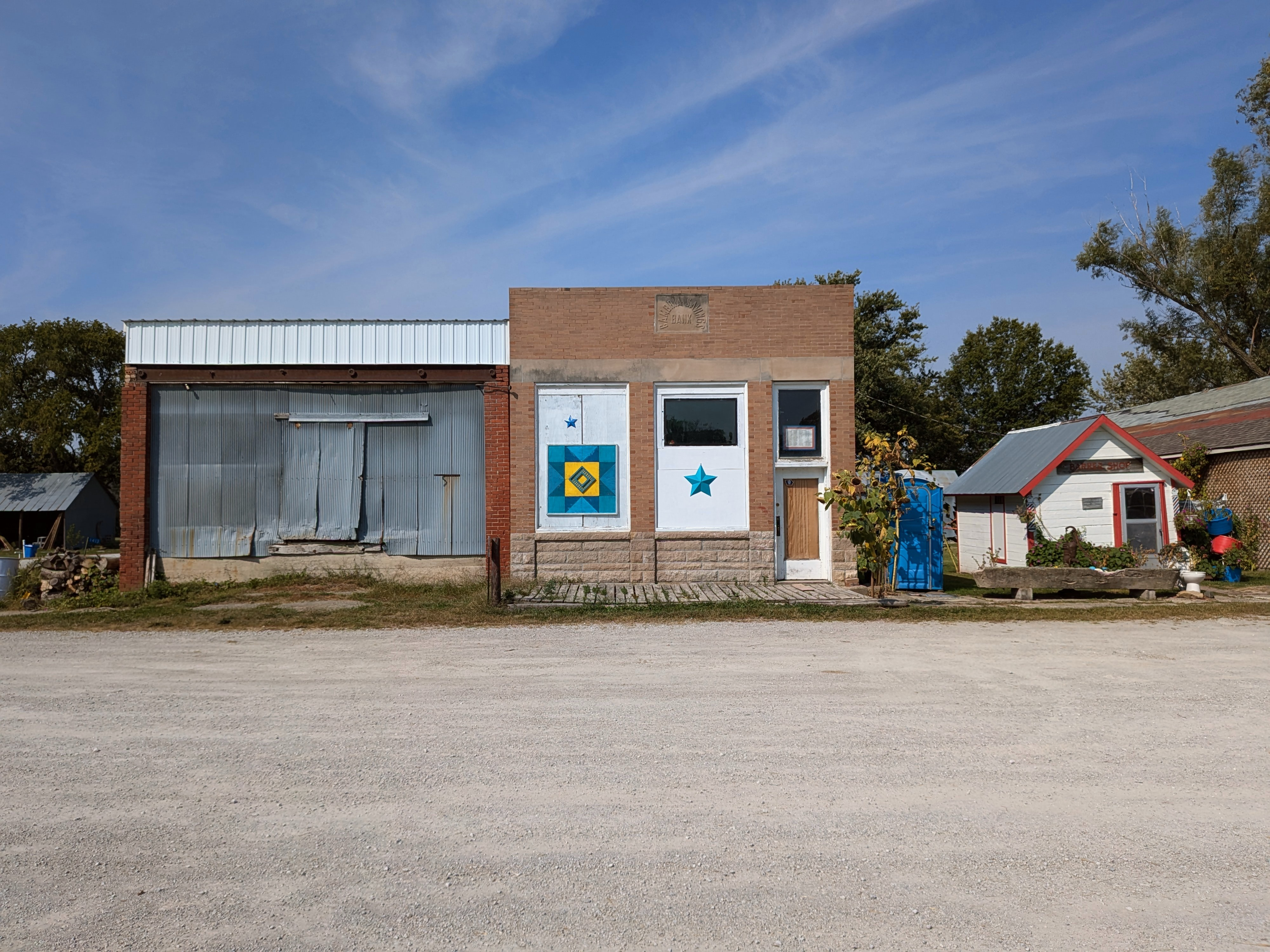
The old bank and post office

In 1879, when a branch of the CB&Q Railroad was built one mile west of the existing town, Cambria was replatted and moved to the railroad. It became a thriving small town with a grocery store, hotel, lumberyard, livestock yards and a bank, as well as many other businesses of that era. The Cambria Cemetery is located near the original town site. The Cambria Savings Bank was incorporated on July 1, 1901 and served the surrounding area until July 26, 1926. Railroad service was discontinued in the mid-1970s and the tracks were torn out shortly thereafter.

== Population ==
The population was 146 in 1940.

Cambria had as many as 300 residents at its peak. Kirby Park is one of the focal points in the community. Its area is part of the Wayne Community school district.
