= Millerton, Iowa =

- City
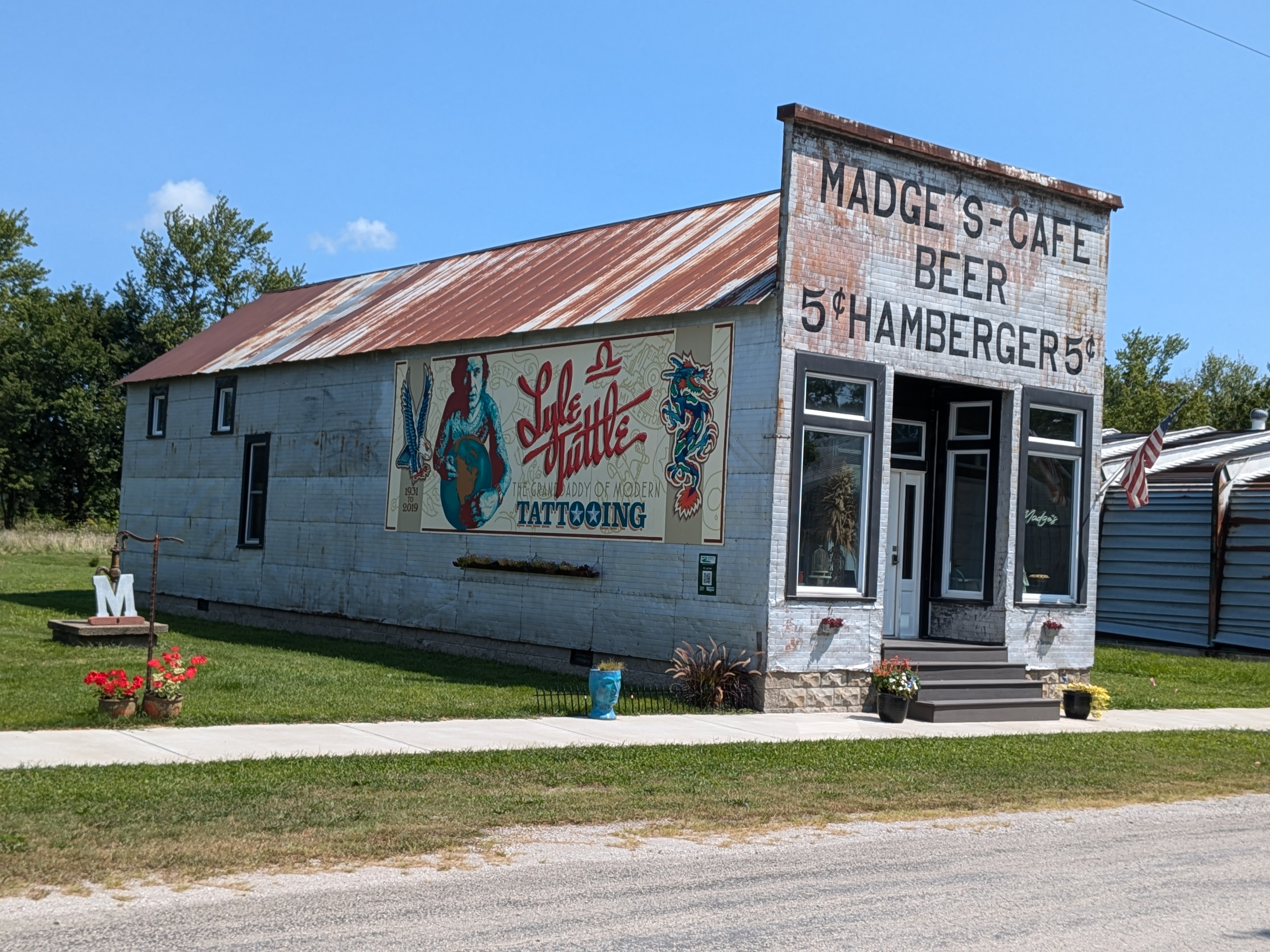
- Madge's Cafe, a landmark in Millerton, Iowa

- Location of Millerton, Iowa
- Coordinates: 40°50′59″N 93°18′25″W
- Country: USA
- State: Iowa
- County: Wayne

Area
  - Total: 0.29 sq mi (0.76 km^{2})
  - Land: 0.29 sq mi (0.76 km^{2})
  - Water: 0 sq mi (0.00 km^{2})
- Elevation: 1,073 ft (327 m)

Population (2020)
  - Total: 36
  - Density: 123.4/sq mi (47.64/km^{2})
- Time zone: UTC-6 (Central (CST))
  - Summer (DST): UTC-5 (CDT)
- ZIP code: 50165
- Area code: 641
- FIPS code: 19-52275
- GNIS feature ID: 2395329

Millerton is a city in Wayne County, Iowa, United States. The population was 36 at the time of the 2020 census.

== Geography ==
According to the United States Census Bureau, the city has a total area of 0.21 square miles (0.54 km^{2}), all land.

== Demographics ==
Historical populations
Year	Pop.	±%
1920	159	—
1930	162	+1.9%
1940	163	+0.6%
1950	140	−14.1%
1960	90	−35.7%
1970	82	−8.9%
1980	72	−12.2%
1990	44	−38.9%
2000	48	+9.1%
2010	45	−6.2%
2020	36	−20.0%
Source:"U.S. Census website". United States Census Bureau. and Iowa Data Center; Source: U.S. Decennial Census

=== 2020 census ===
As of the census of 2020, there were 36 people, 12 households, and 10 families residing in the city. The population density was 123.4 inhabitants per square mile (47.6/km^{2}). There were 24 housing units at an average density of 82.3 per square mile (31.8/km^{2}). The racial makeup of the city was 94.4% White, 0.0% Black or African American, 0.0% Native American, 0.0% Asian, 0.0% Pacific Islander, 0.0% from other races and 5.6% from two or more races. Hispanic or Latino persons of any race comprised 0.0% of the population.

Of the 12 households, 41.7% of which had children under the age of 18 living with them, 66.7% were married couples living together, 8.3% were cohabitating couples, 16.7% had a female householder with no spouse or partner present and 8.3% had a male householder with no spouse or partner present. 16.7% of all households were non-families. 8.3% of all households were made up of individuals, 8.3% had someone living alone who was 65 years old or older.

The median age in the city was 49.5 years. 25.0% of the residents were under the age of 20; 0.0% were between the ages of 20 and 24; 19.4% were from 25 and 44; 36.1% were from 45 and 64; and 19.4% were 65 years of age or older. The gender makeup of the city was 47.2% male and 52.8% female.

=== 2010 census ===
As of the census of 2010, there were 45 people, 18 households, and 10 families living in the city. The population density was 214.3 inhabitants per square mile (82.7/km^{2}). There were 26 housing units at an average density of 123.8 per square mile (47.8/km^{2}). The racial makeup of the city was 95.6% White, 2.2% African American, and 2.2% Native American.

There were 18 households, of which 27.8% had children under the age of 18 living with them, 44.4% were married couples living together, 5.6% had a female householder with no husband present, 5.6% had a male householder with no wife present, and 44.4% were non-families. 22.2% of all households were made up of individuals, and 11.2% had someone living alone who was 65 years of age or older. The average household size was 2.50 and the average family size was 3.20.

The median age in the city was 40.3 years. 22.2% of residents were under the age of 18; 20% were between the ages of 18 and 24; 11% were from 25 to 44; 24.5% were from 45 to 64; and 22.2% were 65 years of age or older. The gender makeup of the city was 46.7% male and 53.3% female.

=== 2000 census ===
As of the census of 2000, there were 48 people, 22 households, and 10 families living in the city. The population density was 230.1 inhabitants per square mile (88.8/km^{2}). There were 28 housing units at an average density of 134.2 per square mile (51.8/km^{2}). The racial makeup of the city was 100.00% White.

There were 22 households, out of which 27.3% had children under the age of 18 living with them, 45.5% were married couples living together, and 54.5% were non-families. 54.5% of all households were made up of individuals, and 40.9% had someone living alone who was 65 years of age or older. The average household size was 2.18 and the average family size was 3.60.

In the city, the population was spread out, with 27.1% under the age of 18, 6.3% from 18 to 24, 25.0% from 25 to 44, 20.8% from 45 to 64, and 20.8% who were 65 years of age or older. The median age was 39 years. For every 100 females, there were 65.5 males. For every 100 females age 18 and over, there were 75.0 males.

The median income for a household in the city was $19,286, and the median income for a family was $43,750. Males had a median income of $26,250 versus $25,625 for females. The per capita income for the city was $10,650. None of the population and none of the families were below the poverty line.

== Education ==
Wayne Community School District operates public schools serving the community.
