= South Fork Township, Wayne County, Iowa =

Township in Wayne County, Iowa, U.S.

Coordinates: 40.768°N 93.155°W

South Fork Township is a township in Wayne County, Iowa, USA.

== History ==
South Fork Township is named from its location on that part of the river.
