= Wayne County Courthouse (Iowa) =

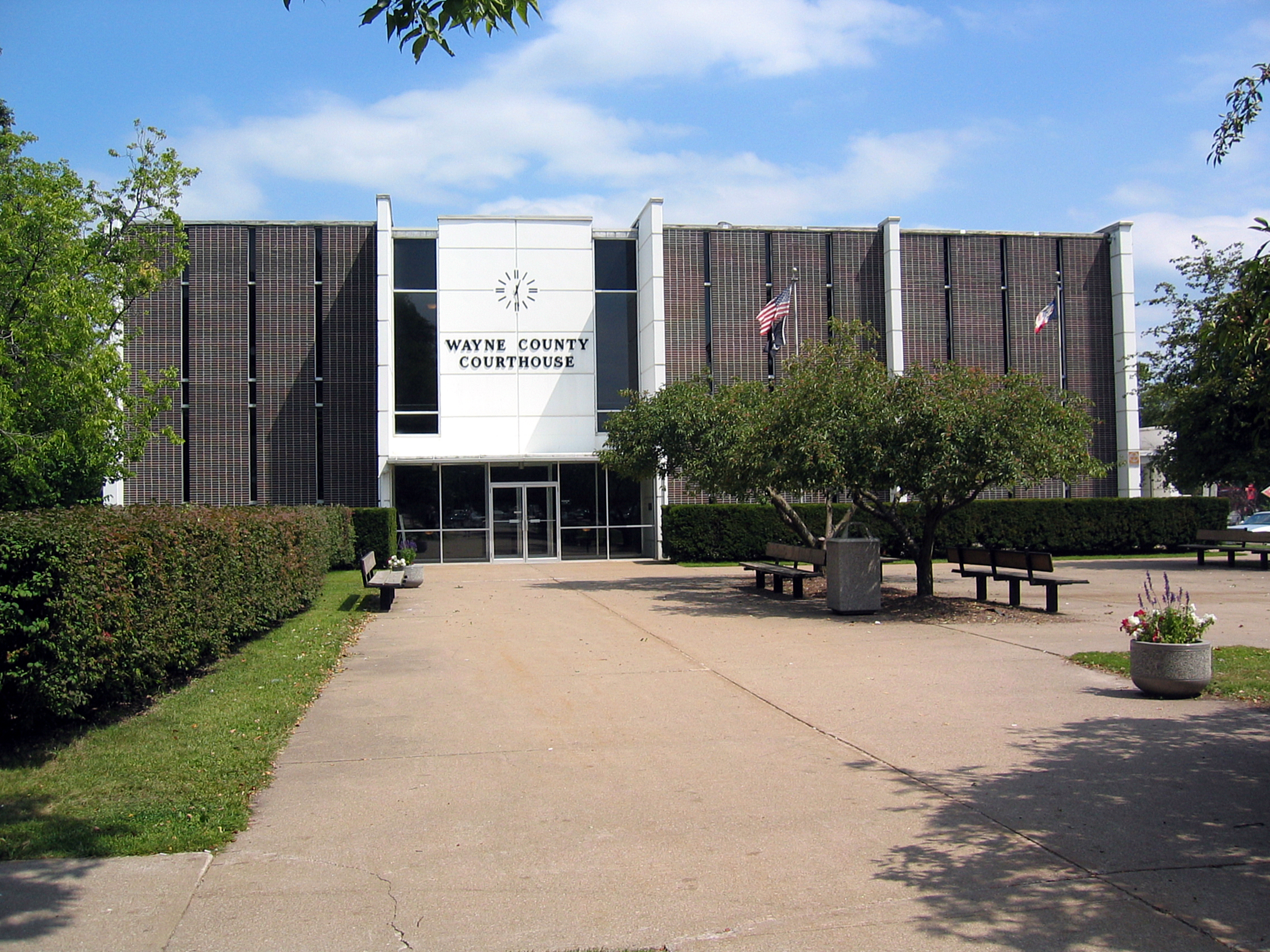
- Wayne County Courthouse
- Interactive map of the Wayne County Courthouse area

General information
- Type: Courthouse
- Architectural style: Modern
- Location: N. Franklin Street, Corydon, Iowa, United States
- Coordinates: 40.757778°N 93.317600°W
- Completed: 1964

Technical details
- Floor count: Two

Design and construction
- Architecture firm: Frankhiser & Hutchens
- Main contractor: Grabau Construction

The Wayne County Courthouse is located in Corydon, Iowa, United States. Three buildings have served Wayne County as its courthouse.

== History ==
The first building was a two-story structure completed in 1856 for $600. Offices were located on the second floor and the courtroom was on the first floor. The citizens of Corydon raised $18,000 to build a new courthouse, and keep it in town. The two-story brick building with a clock tower was completed in 1890. The old courthouse was moved out of town and converted into a farmhouse. The present Modernist structure replaced it in 1964 for under $450,000. Frankhiser & Hutchens designed the building, and it was built by Grabau Construction.

The courthouse is a two-story concrete structure. The main facade is divided into four bays by concrete dividers. The main entrance is in the second bay that features a white concrete wall and a clock. The other bays are faced with dark brown brick with narrow windows. The north and south elevations are faced with white concrete. The roof is flat.
