= Walnut Township, Wayne County, Iowa =

Township in Wayne County, Iowa, U.S.

Coordinates: 40.681°N 93.155°W

Walnut Township is a township in Wayne County, Iowa, USA.

== History ==
Walnut Township was named from Walnut Creek.
