= Eden Township, Decatur County, Iowa =

Eden Township
- Township
- Location in Decatur County
- Coordinates: 40°41′12″N 93°43′14″W
- Country: United States
- State: Iowa
- County: Decatur

Area
  - Total: 36.17 sq mi (93.67 km^{2})
  - Land: 36.13 sq mi (93.58 km^{2})
  - Water: 0.035 sq mi (0.09 km^{2}) 0.1%
- Elevation: 1,086 ft (331 m)

Population (2000)
  - Total: 279
  - Density: 7.8/sq mi (3/km^{2})
- GNIS feature ID: 0467763

Eden Township is a township in Decatur County, Iowa, United States. As of the 2000 census, its population was 279.

== Geography ==
Eden Township covers an area of 36.17 square miles (93.67 square kilometers); of this, 0.03 square miles (0.09 square kilometers) or 0.1 percent is water. The streams of Britton Branch and McGruder Creek run through this township.

=== Unincorporated towns ===
- Blockly

(This list is based on USGS data and may include former settlements.)

=== Adjacent townships ===
- Center Township (north)
- High Point Township (northeast)
- Woodland Township (east)
- Morgan Township (southeast)
- Hamilton Township (south)
- New Buda Township (southwest)
- Burrell Township (west)
- Decatur Township (northwest)
- Leon Township (northwest)

=== Cemeteries ===
The township contains eight cemeteries: Bethel, Campbell, Chastain, County Home, Hatfield, Manchester, Meek and Mount Tabor.

=== Major highways ===
- U.S. Route 69

=== Climate ===
This region has significant seasonal temperature differences, going from warm summers to very cold winters. There is precipitation year-round, and snowfall occurs in almost areas. Most summer rainfall occurs during thunderstorms and a very occasional tropical system. Area is only classified as humid because it is not dry enough to be classified as semi-arid or arid.

Climate data for Eden Township, Iowa
Month	Jan	Feb	Mar	Apr	May	Jun	Jul	Aug	Sep	Oct	Nov	Dec	Year
Mean daily maximum °C (°F)	−2 (28)	1 (33)	8 (46)	17 (62)	22 (72)	27 (81)	29 (85)	28 (83)	24 (76)	18 (64)	8 (47)	0 (32)	15 (59)
Mean daily minimum °C (°F)	−12 (10)	−9 (15)	−3 (26)	3 (38)	9 (49)	14 (58)	17 (62)	16 (60)	11 (51)	5 (41)	−2 (28)	−9 (16)	3 (38)
Average precipitation days	1.1	1.0	2.1	3.4	4.2	4.4	3.9	3.7	3.4	2.4	1.8	1.4	32.7
Source: Weatherbase
