= Howard Township, Wayne County, Iowa =

Township in Wayne County, Iowa, U.S.

Coordinates: 40.61°N 93.27°W

Howard Township is a township in Wayne County, Iowa, USA.

== History ==
Howard Township is named for Tilghman Howard.
