= Wright Township, Wayne County, Iowa =

American township in Wayne County, Iowa

Wright Township is an American township in Wayne County, Iowa. It was named for Greenwood Wright, a pioneer settler.
