= Burrell Township, Decatur County, Iowa =

Burrell Township
- Township
- Location in Decatur County
- Coordinates: 40°40′52″N 93°50′24″W
- Country: United States
- State: Iowa
- County: Decatur

Area
  - Total: 35.80 sq mi (92.72 km^{2})
  - Land: 35.68 sq mi (92.42 km^{2})
  - Water: 0.12 sq mi (0.3 km^{2}) 0.32%
- Elevation: 945 ft (288 m)

Population (2000)
  - Total: 354
  - Density: 9.8/sq mi (3.8/km^{2})
- GNIS feature ID: 0467509

Burrell Township is a township in Decatur County, Iowa, United States. As of the 2000 census, its population was 354.

== Geography ==
Burrell Township covers an area of 35.8 square miles (92.72 square kilometers); of this, 0.12 square miles (0.3 square kilometers) or 0.32 percent is water. The streams of Elk Creek and Potteroff Creek run through this township.

== History ==
Burrell Township was created in 1850. It is named for county commissioner Asa Burrell.

=== Cities and towns ===
- Davis City (northwest three-quarters)

=== Unincorporated towns ===
- Barrell
- Terre Haute

(This list is based on USGS data and may include former settlements.)

=== Adjacent townships ===
- Decatur Township (north)
- Center Township (northeast)
- Eden Township (east)
- Hamilton Township (southeast)
- New Buda Township (south)
- Fayette Township (southwest)
- Bloomington Township (west)
- Grand River Township (northwest)

=== Cemeteries ===
The township contains five cemeteries: Bucy, Davis City, Gore, Miller and Terre Haute.

=== Major highways ===
- Interstate 35
- U.S. Route 69
