= Russell Community School District =

School district in Iowa, United States

Russell Community School District was a school district headquartered in Russell, Iowa. It operated two schools: Russell Elementary School and Russell Jr./Sr. High School.

It included parts of Lucas, Monroe, and Wayne counties.

== History ==
In the 1950s the bluebirds were the school mascot, but it was changed to the trojans because opposing teams had mocked the bluebirds.

In April 2008 the district had about 154 students in all grade levels, including 12 in the 12th grade, making it Iowa's 19th-smallest school district. That year, over 40% of the pupils living in the Russell district boundaries attended other public school districts, with the Chariton Community School District taking the majority of students in that group.

In May 2008 all members of the Iowa Board of Education voted to permanently close the Russell district. The state voted so because of financial issues in the Russell district; the district spent funds on general expenses and salaries that were supposed to be used for facilities only. The state gained the authority to force districts to close for financial reasons because of a law passed in 2007. Russell was the second district ever forced to close by the Iowa state board. The closure was effective July 1, 2008. Of the employers in Russell, the school district had the most employees. Reid Forgrave of The Des Moines Register stated that because the school closed, the Russell community had its identity damaged. In July 2008 the Chariton district, desiring to sell the Russell building, decided to remove material from the Russell School.

The city of Russell is now in the Chariton district. In addition to the Chariton district, Russell district students were also reassigned to the Albia Community School District and the Wayne Community School District.

== See also ==
School districts forced by the Iowa Board of Education to merge

- Farragut Community School District
- Hedrick Community School District
