= Monroe Township, Wayne County, Iowa =

Township in Wayne County, Iowa, U.S.

Coordinates: 40.610°N 93.155°W

Monroe Township is a township in Wayne County, Iowa, USA.

== History ==
Monroe Township is named after James Monroe.
