= Irene Cozad =

American pianist, piano teacher, and composer

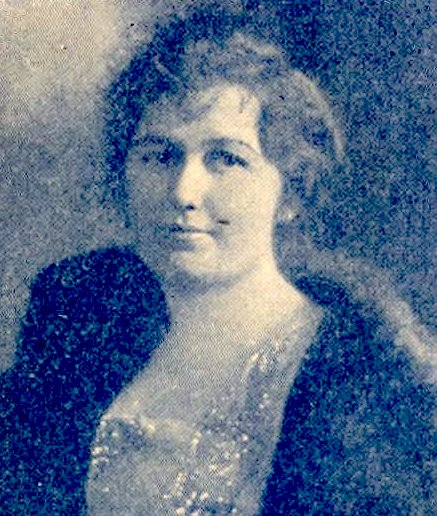
- Irene Cozad Sherer, from sheet music published in 1920.
- Born: Irene Bazelle Cozad; July 4, 1888; Lineville, Iowa
- Died: August 2, 1970 (aged 82); Kansas City, Missouri
- Other names: Irene Cozad-Sherer, I. C. Sherer
- Occupation: composer

Irene Cozad (July 4, 1888 – August 2, 1970), later known as Irene Cozad-Sherer, was an American pianist, piano teacher, and composer of ragtime music.

== Early life ==
Irene Bazelle Cozad was born in Lineville, Iowa, one of the nine children of Joseph Addison Cozad and Olive Jane Vanderbeck Cozad. Her father was a school teacher and worked at a newspaper.

== Career ==
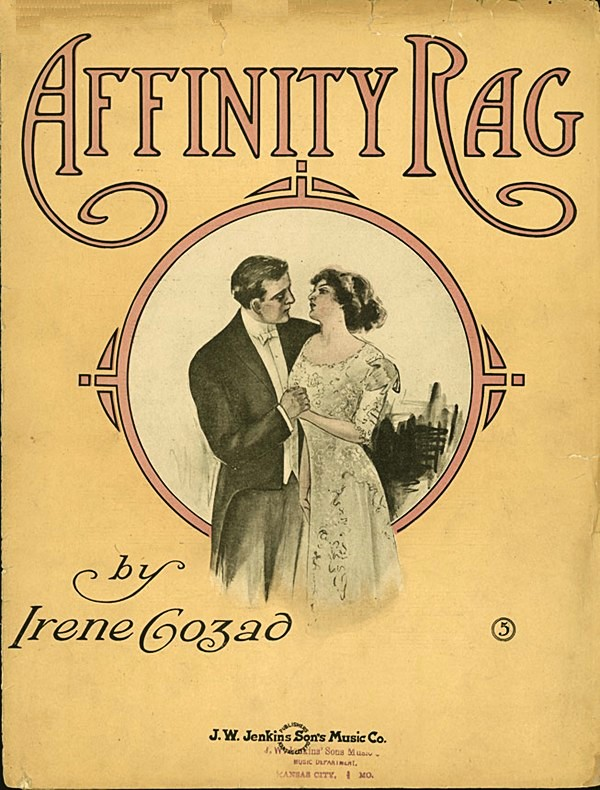
Affinity Rag (1910), sheet music cover.

Cozad played and taught piano in Kansas City, Missouri. Compositions by Cozad included "Affinity Rag" (1910), "Eatin' Time Rag" (1913), "That Sunday Wedding Day" (1914, words by Gwen Meredith), "The Minute Circle Whirl" (1916), "Because", and "Kansas City Town" (1920). The last, "Kansas City Town", was written for a contest marking the year that the city's population reached one million. Her compositions are considered an example of the Kansas City Folk Rag genre.

== Personal life ==
Irene Cozad married Joseph Whitman Sherer, a medical doctor, in 1912. They had a daughter, Jeanne, and a son, Joseph Jr. Her husband died in a car accident in 1940; she died in Kansas City in 1970, aged 82 years.

Her compositions are sometimes featured in recordings and performances of ragtime works by women, including the collections Pickles and Peppers (1987) and Fluffy Ruffle Girls: Women in Ragtime (1999), both by Virginia Eskin.
