= Seymour, Iowa =

- City
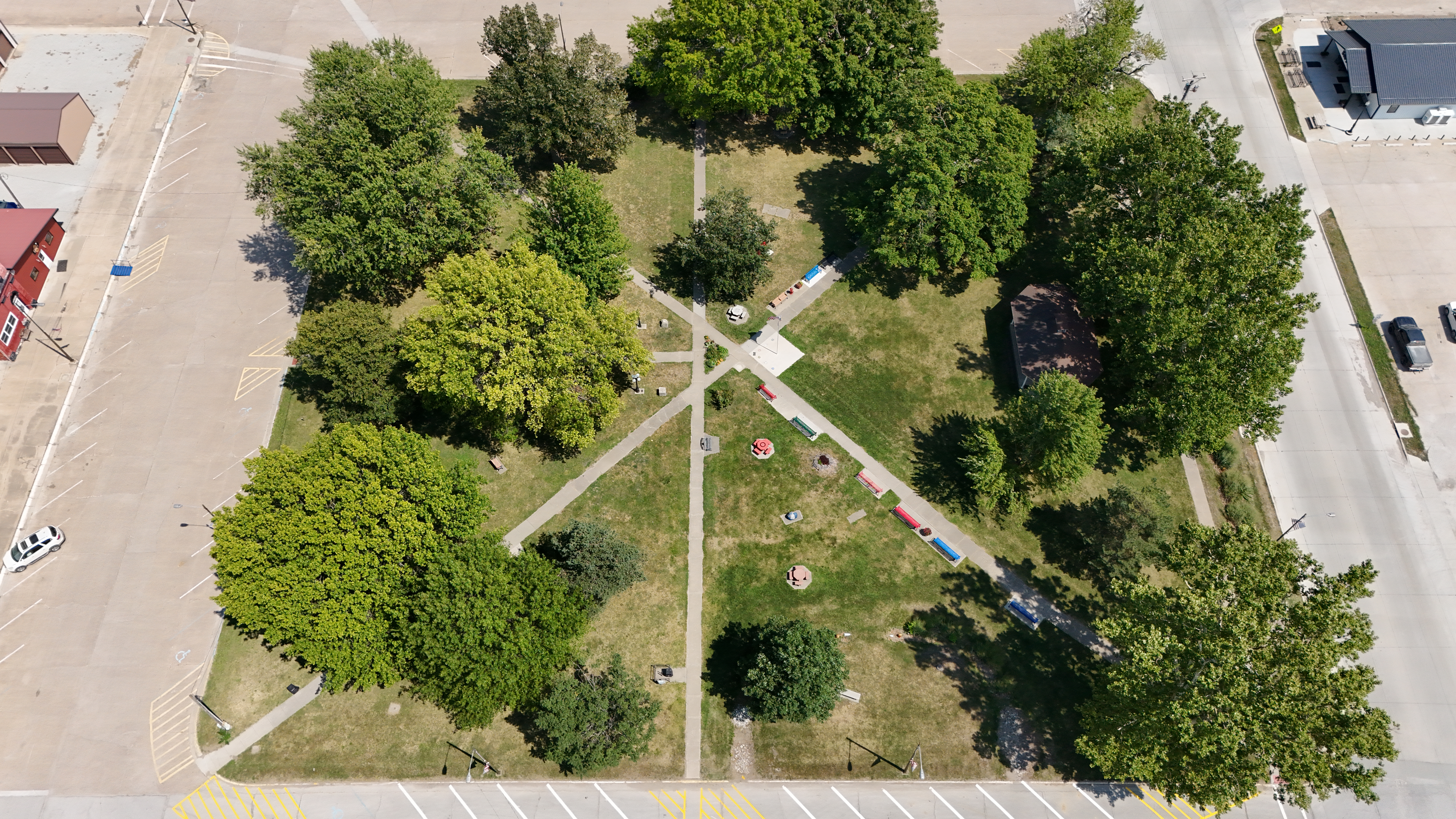
- A city park in the central square of Seymour, Iowa

- Location of Seymour, Iowa
- Coordinates: 40°40′56″N 93°07′16″W
- Country: USA
- State: Iowa
- County: Wayne

Area
  - Total: 2.39 sq mi (6.20 km^{2})
  - Land: 2.39 sq mi (6.20 km^{2})
  - Water: 0 sq mi (0.00 km^{2})
- Elevation: 1,076 ft (328 m)

Population (2020)
  - Total: 634
  - Density: 265.0/sq mi (102.32/km^{2})
- Time zone: UTC−6 (Central (CST))
  - Summer (DST): UTC−5 (CDT)
- ZIP code: 52590
- Area code: 641
- FIPS code: 19-71760
- GNIS feature ID: 2395851

Seymour is a city in Wayne County, Iowa, United States. The population was 634 at the time of the 2020 census.

== History ==
The first coal mines in Seymour were opened in 1884. In 1902, the Numa Block Coal Company took over these mines. In 1908, the largest coal mine in Appanoose-Wayne Coalfield was Numa Block number 2, known as "Big Jim." "Big Jim" was located just 1 mile (1.6 km) east of the Chicago, Milwaukee and St. Paul Railway Depot, and was able to produce 100,000 tons of coal per year at full capacity. The Mystic coal seam was just over 2 feet (0.61 m) thick here, reached by a 202-foot-long (62 m) shaft. Numa Block Mine number 3, the Sunshine Mine, was in the southeast part of town, served by the Rock Island, with a 240-foot-long (73 m) shaft to the Mystic seam.

In 1884, Local Assembly 3143 of the Knights of Labor, based in Seymour, had 40 members. In 1912, United Mine Workers Local 206 in Seymour had 299 members, approximately 13% of the entire population.

In December 1996 an Old Order Amish settlement near Seymour was founded by a family from Van Buren County, Iowa. In 2025 it had a total population of 1,180 people in 9 church districts and it was the fourth largest in Iowa.

On March 6, 2017, an EF-2 tornado (confirmed by National Weather Service WFO, Des Moines, IA damage survey) hit Seymour at approximately 8:00 pm CST, damaging homes, businesses and the high school.

== Geography ==
According to the United States Census Bureau, the city has a total area of 2.35 square miles (6.09 km^{2}), all land.

== Transportation ==
Seymour is served by a county-maintained road which used to be Iowa Highway 55 and is now County Road S60.

Seymour is served by the CPKC Railroad, formerly Canadian Pacific Railway which currently operates the former Milwaukee Railroad tracks.

Seymour was also served by the CRI&P (Rock Island) until the early 1980s. This line passed on the southwest corner of the town square with the depot in this location. This line was abandoned when the Rock Island went bankrupt. It used to be part of the Golden State Route which was a luxury passenger train operated by the Rock Island and the Southern Pacific.

The two railroad lines crossed at the western edge of Seymour and was protected by an interlocking tower until the Rock Island was abandoned.

== Demographics ==
Historical populations
Year	Pop.	±%
1880	501	—
1890	1,058	+111.2%
1900	1,703	+61.0%
1910	2,290	+34.5%
1920	1,746	−23.8%
1930	1,571	−10.0%
1940	1,539	−2.0%
1950	1,223	−20.5%
1960	1,117	−8.7%
1970	931	−16.7%
1980	1,036	+11.3%
1990	869	−16.1%
2000	810	−6.8%
2010	701	−13.5%
2020	634	−9.6%
Iowa Data Center; Source: U.S. Decennial Census

=== 2020 census ===
As of the census of 2020, there were 634 people, 274 households, and 167 families residing in the city. The population density was 265.0 inhabitants per square mile (102.3/km^{2}). There were 312 housing units at an average density of 130.4 per square mile (50.4/km^{2}). The racial makeup of the city was 93.1% White, 0.0% Black or African American, 0.8% Native American, 0.3% Asian, 0.0% Pacific Islander, 0.0% from other races and 5.8% from two or more races. Hispanic or Latino persons of any race comprised 1.6% of the population.

Of the 274 households, 27.7% of which had children under the age of 18 living with them, 41.2% were married couples living together, 4.0% were cohabitating couples, 33.2% had a female householder with no spouse or partner present and 21.5% had a male householder with no spouse or partner present. 39.1% of all households were non-families. 35.4% of all households were made up of individuals, 16.1% had someone living alone who was 65 years old or older.

The median age in the city was 41.6 years. 26.3% of the residents were under the age of 20; 5.5% were between the ages of 20 and 24; 21.0% were from 25 and 44; 26.7% were from 45 and 64; and 20.5% were 65 years of age or older. The gender makeup of the city was 48.1% male and 51.9% female.

=== 2010 census ===
As of the census of 2010, there were 701 people, 295 households, and 192 families residing in the city. The population density was 298.3 inhabitants per square mile (115.2/km^{2}). There were 348 housing units at an average density of 148.1 per square mile (57.2/km^{2}). The racial makeup of the city was 98.7% White, 0.4% Asian, and 0.9% from two or more races. Hispanic or Latino of any race were 1.6% of the population.

There were 295 households, of which 26.1% had children under the age of 18 living with them, 45.1% were married couples living together, 16.3% had a female householder with no husband present, 3.7% had a male householder with no wife present, and 34.9% were non-families. 30.5% of all households were made up of individuals, and 13.3% had someone living alone who was 65 years of age or older. The average household size was 2.38 and the average family size was 2.80.

The median age in the city was 47.1 years. 20.8% of residents were under the age of 18; 7.3% were between the ages of 18 and 24; 20% were from 25 to 44; 27.4% were from 45 to 64; and 24.5% were 65 years of age or older. The gender makeup of the city was 48.5% male and 51.5% female.

=== 2000 census ===
As of the census of 2000, there were 810 people, 336 households, and 219 families residing in the city. The population density was 344.5 inhabitants per square mile (133.0/km^{2}). There were 393 housing units at an average density of 167.1 per square mile (64.5/km^{2}). The racial makeup of the city was 97.53% White, 0.37% Native American, 0.99% from other races, and 1.11% from two or more races. Hispanic or Latino of any race were 2.10% of the population.

There were 336 households, out of which 27.1% had children under the age of 18 living with them, 53.3% were married couples living together, 8.9% had a female householder with no husband present, and 34.8% were non-families. 31.5% of all households were made up of individuals, and 17.3% had someone living alone who was 65 years of age or older. The average household size was 2.30 and the average family size was 2.89.

In the city, the population was spread out, with 23.0% under the age of 18, 6.4% from 18 to 24, 24.9% from 25 to 44, 20.9% from 45 to 64, and 24.8% who were 65 years of age or older. The median age was 42 years. For every 100 females, there were 91.0 males. For every 100 females age 18 and over, there were 90.8 males.

The median income for a household in the city was $26,172, and the median income for a family was $32,692. Males had a median income of $24,531 versus $20,833 for females. The per capita income for the city was $13,581. About 12.7% of families and 22.0% of the population were below the poverty line, including 37.3% of those under age 18 and 12.3% of those age 65 or over.

== Education ==
The Seymour Community School District operates local area public schools.

== Notable people ==
- Marcus Collins, actor and singer with The Texas Tenors
- John C. Mabee, thoroughbred racehorse owner/breeder
- Jane Wilson, artist
