= Washington Township, Wayne County, Iowa =

Township in Wayne County, Iowa, U.S.

Coordinates: 40.8483°N 93.3939°W

Washington Township is a township in Wayne County, Iowa, USA.

== History ==
Washington Township is named for George Washington.
