= Promise City, Iowa =

- City
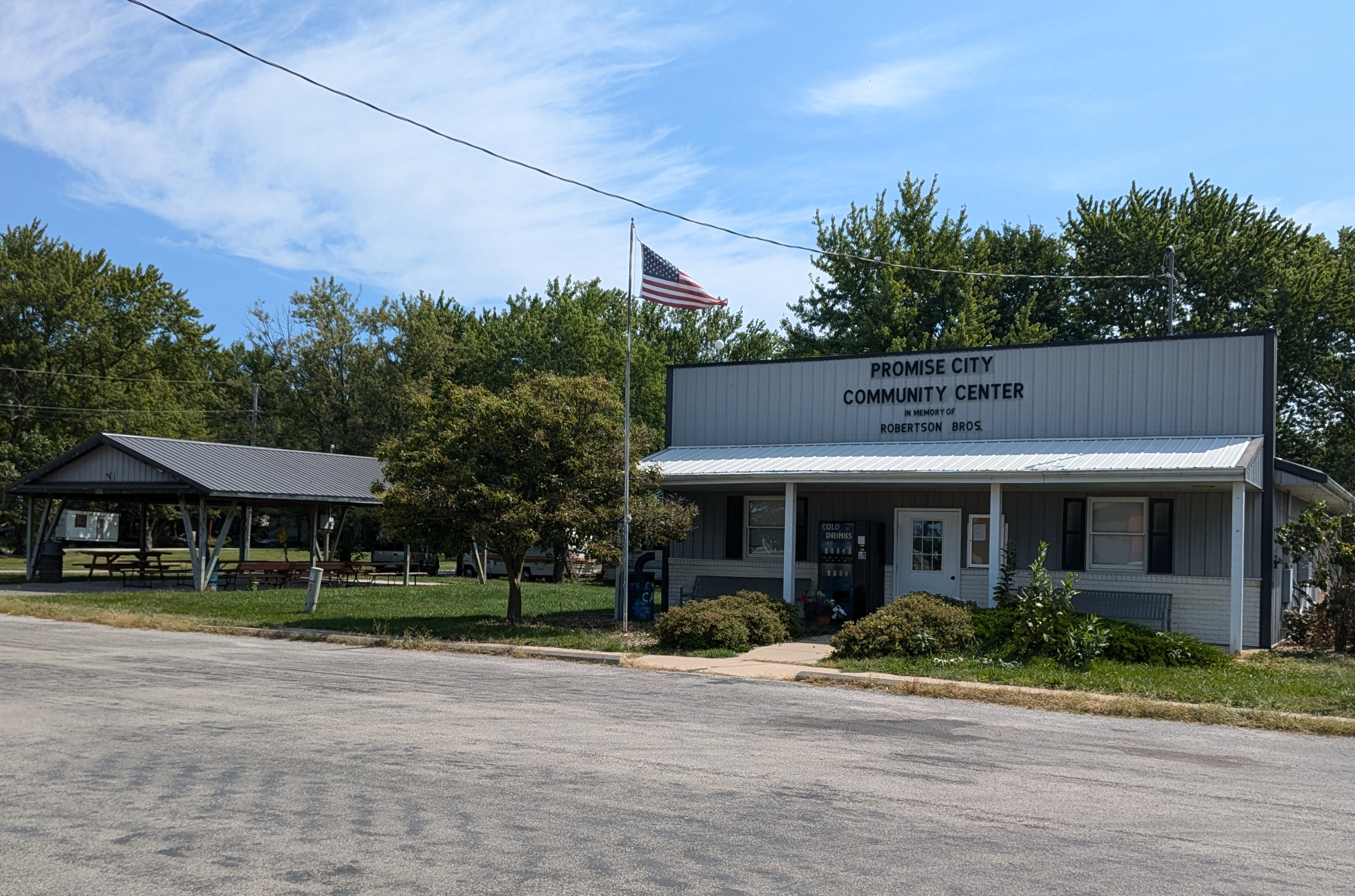
- Promise City, Iowa, Community Center and city park

- Location of Promise City, Iowa
- Coordinates: 40°44′56″N 93°09′00″W
- Country: USA
- State: Iowa
- County: Wayne

Area
  - Total: 0.19 sq mi (0.49 km^{2})
  - Land: 0.19 sq mi (0.48 km^{2})
  - Water: 0.0039 sq mi (0.01 km^{2})
- Elevation: 1,056 ft (322 m)

Population (2020)
  - Total: 88
  - Density: 477.0/sq mi (184.17/km^{2})
- Time zone: UTC-6 (Central (CST))
  - Summer (DST): UTC-5 (CDT)
- ZIP code: 52583
- Area code: 641
- FIPS code: 19-64875
- GNIS feature ID: 2396286

Promise City is a city in Wayne County, Iowa, United States. The population was 88 at the time of the 2020 census.

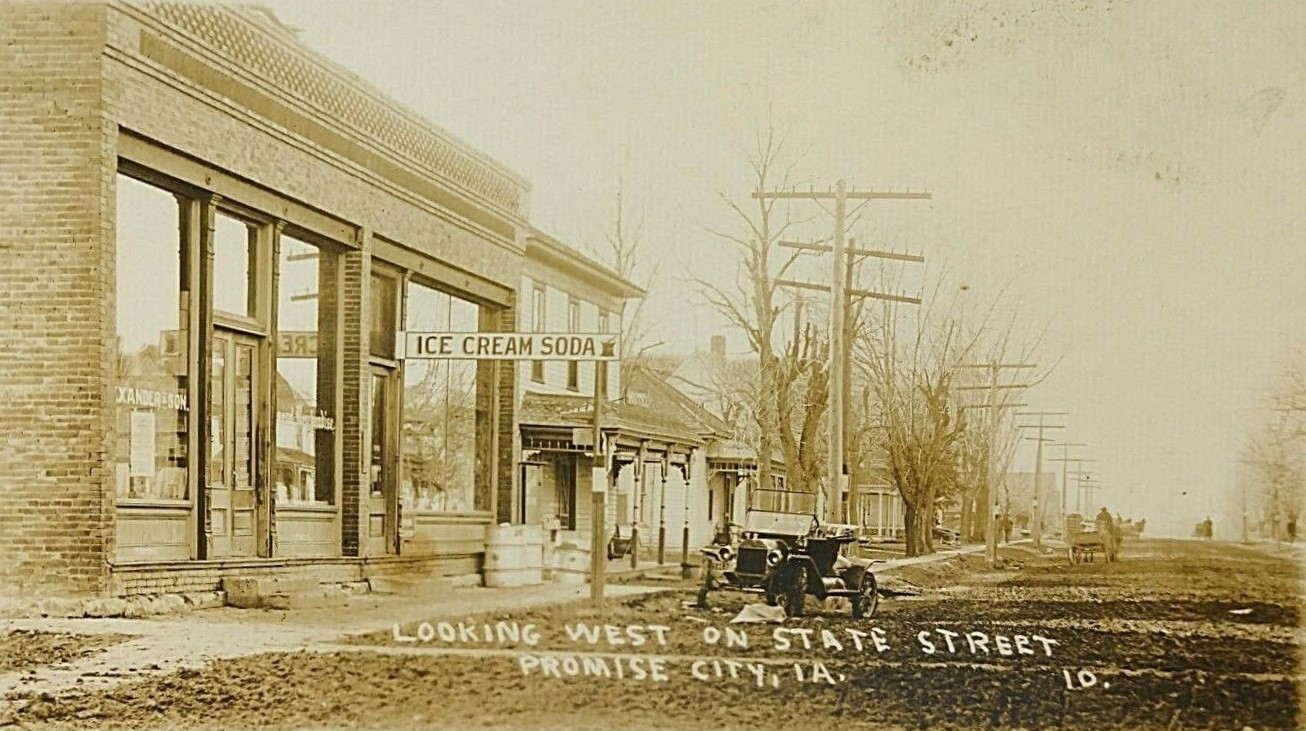
Looking west on State Street, Promise City, Iowa, c. 1915

== Geography ==
According to the United States Census Bureau, the city has a total area of 0.19 square miles (0.49 km^{2}), all land.

== Demographics ==
Historical populations
Year	Pop.	±%
1880	203	—
1910	274	+35.0%
1920	267	−2.6%
1930	226	−15.4%
1940	225	−0.4%
1950	218	−3.1%
1960	161	−26.1%
1970	148	−8.1%
1980	149	+0.7%
1990	132	−11.4%
2000	105	−20.5%
2010	111	+5.7%
2020	88	−20.7%
Source:"U.S. Census website". United States Census Bureau. and Iowa Data Center; Source: U.S. Decennial Census

=== 2020 census ===
As of the census of 2020, there were 88 people, 35 households, and 20 families residing in the city. The population density was 477.0 inhabitants per square mile (184.2/km^{2}). There were 54 housing units at an average density of 292.7 per square mile (113.0/km^{2}). The racial makeup of the city was 98.9% White, 0.0% Black or African American, 0.0% Native American, 0.0% Asian, 0.0% Pacific Islander, 0.0% from other races and 1.1% from two or more races. Hispanic or Latino persons of any race comprised 0.0% of the population.

Of the 35 households, 25.7% of which had children under the age of 18 living with them, 37.1% were married couples living together, 8.6% were cohabitating couples, 20.0% had a female householder with no spouse or partner present and 34.3% had a male householder with no spouse or partner present. 42.9% of all households were non-families. 37.1% of all households were made up of individuals, 25.7% had someone living alone who was 65 years old or older.

The median age in the city was 40.0 years. 27.3% of the residents were under the age of 20; 4.5% were between the ages of 20 and 24; 20.5% were from 25 and 44; 25.0% were from 45 and 64; and 22.7% were 65 years of age or older. The gender makeup of the city was 48.9% male and 51.1% female.

=== 2010 census ===
At the 2010 census, there were 111 people, 49 households and 29 families living in the city. The population density was 584.2 inhabitants per square mile (225.6/km^{2}). There were 57 housing units at an average density of 300.0 per square mile (115.8/km^{2}). The racial makeup of the city was 97.3% White, 1.8% Asian, and 0.9% from other races. Hispanic or Latino of any race were 0.9% of the population.

There were 49 households, of which 16.3% had children under the age of 18 living with them, 51.0% were married couples living together, 6.1% had a female householder with no husband present, 2.0% had a male householder with no wife present, and 40.8% were non-families. 32.7% of all households were made up of individuals, and 16.4% had someone living alone who was 65 years of age or older. The average household size was 2.27 and the average family size was 3.00.

The median age was 46.1 years. 17.1% of residents were under the age of 18; 8.1% were between the ages of 18 and 24; 20.7% were from 25 to 44; 31.5% were from 45 to 64; and 22.5% were 65 years of age or older. The population was 55.9% male and 44.1% female.

=== 2000 census ===
At the 2000 census, there were 105 people, 50 households and 29 families living in the city. The population density was 561.6 inhabitants per square mile (216.8/km^{2}). There were 64 housing units at an average density of 342.3 per square mile (132.2/km^{2}). The racial makeup of the city was 99.05% White, and 0.95% from two or more races. Hispanic or Latino of any race were 0.95% of the population.

There were 50 households, of which 24.0% had children under the age of 18 living with them, 50.0% were married couples living together, 4.0% had a female householder with no husband present, and 42.0% were non-families. 38.0% of all households were made up of individuals, and 22.0% had someone living alone who was 65 years of age or older. The average household size was 2.10 and the average family size was 2.69.

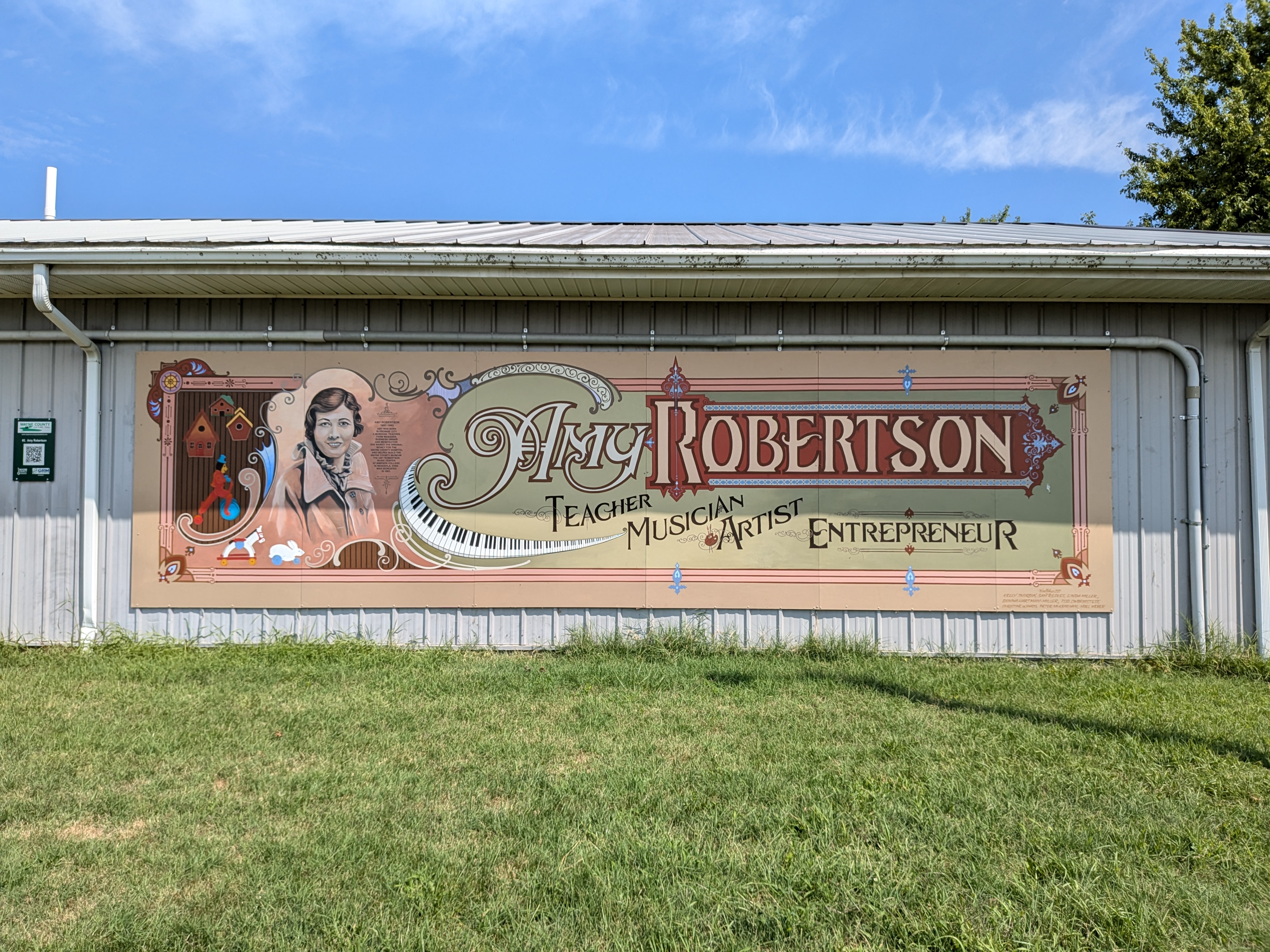
A painting in Promise City commemorating Amy Robertson (1897 - 1992) a musician, teacher, farm manager, business owner and benefactor, born in Promise City

19.0% of the population were under the age of 18, 3.8% from 18 to 24, 27.6% from 25 to 44, 25.7% from 45 to 64, and 23.8% who were 65 years of age or older. The median age was 43 years. For every 100 females, there were 94.4 males. For every 100 females age 18 and over, there were 88.9 males.

The median household income was $17,917 and the median family income was $25,000. Males had a median income of $19,000 compared with $18,750 for females. The per capita income was $10,637. There were 23.1% of families and 19.8% of the population living below the poverty line, including no under eighteens and 13.8% of those over 64.

== Education ==
The Seymour Community School District operates local area public schools.
