= Grand River Township, Wayne County, Iowa =

Township in Wayne County, Iowa, U.S.

Coordinates: 40.609°N 93.499°W

Grand River Township is a township in Wayne County, Iowa, USA.

== History ==
This township is named from the Grand River, which runs through its northeastern section.
