= Richman Township, Wayne County, Iowa =

Township in Wayne County, Iowa, U.S.

Coordinates: 40.855°N 93.499°W

Richman Township is a township in Wayne County, Iowa, USA.

== History ==
Richman Township was named after M. H. Richman, a pioneer settler.
