= Clay Township, Wayne County, Iowa =

Township in Wayne County, Iowa, U.S.

Coordinates: 40.7683°N 93.4994°W

Clay Township is a township in Wayne County, Iowa, USA.

== History ==
Clay Township is named for Kentucky statesman Henry Clay.
