= Corydon, Iowa =

- City
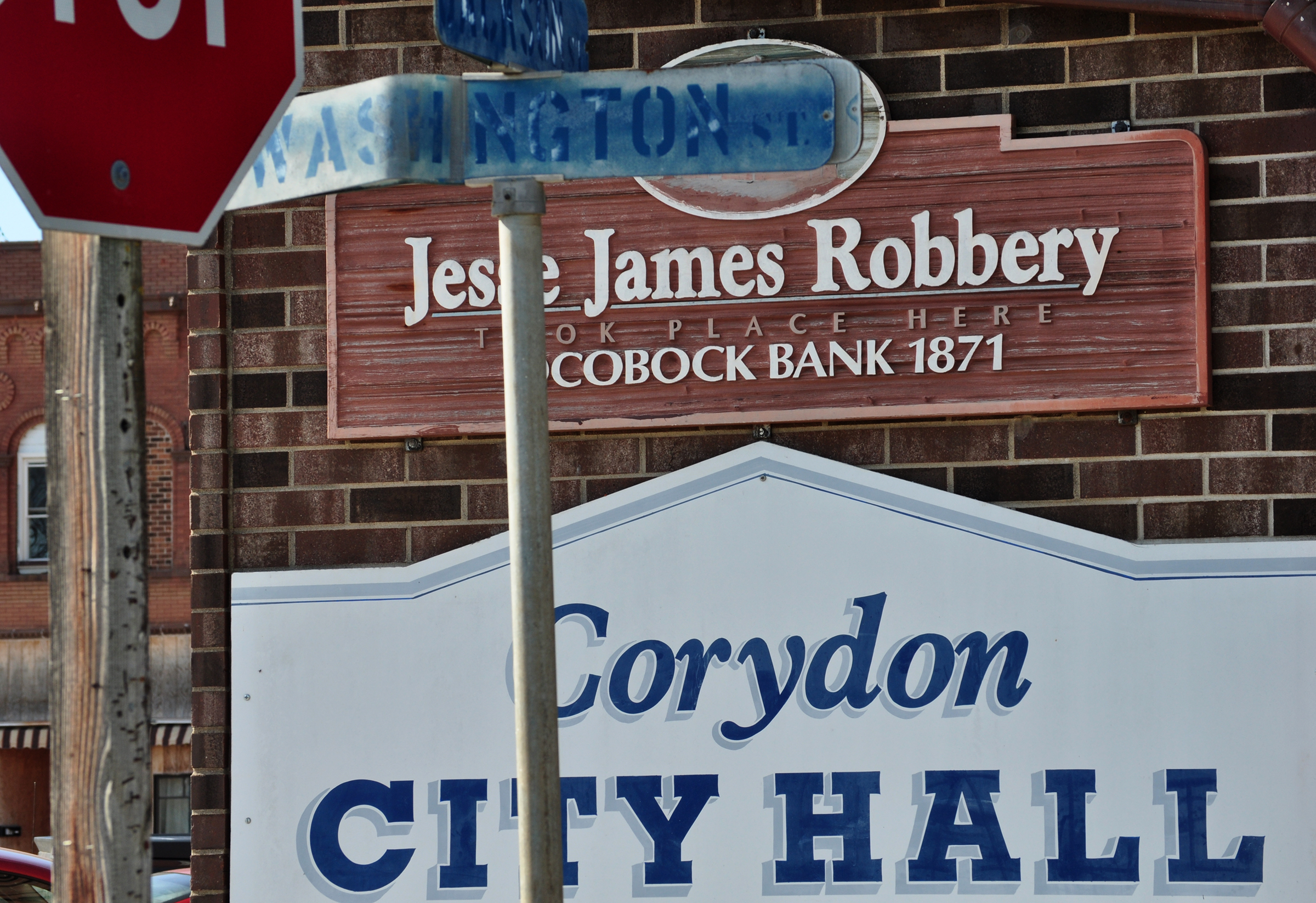
- Corydon bank and city hall

- Location of Corydon, Iowa
- Coordinates: 40°45′13″N 93°18′53″W
- Country: USA
- State: Iowa
- County: Wayne
- Incorporated: April 27, 1867

Area
  - Total: 1.35 sq mi (3.49 km^{2})
  - Land: 1.35 sq mi (3.49 km^{2})
  - Water: 0 sq mi (0.00 km^{2})
- Elevation: 1,093 ft (333 m)

Population (2020)
  - Total: 1,526
  - Density: 1,131.0/sq mi (436.69/km^{2})
- Time zone: UTC-6 (Central (CST))
  - Summer (DST): UTC-5 (CDT)
- ZIP code: 50060
- Area code: 641
- FIPS code: 19-16635
- GNIS feature ID: 2393642
- Website: www.cityofcorydoniowa.com

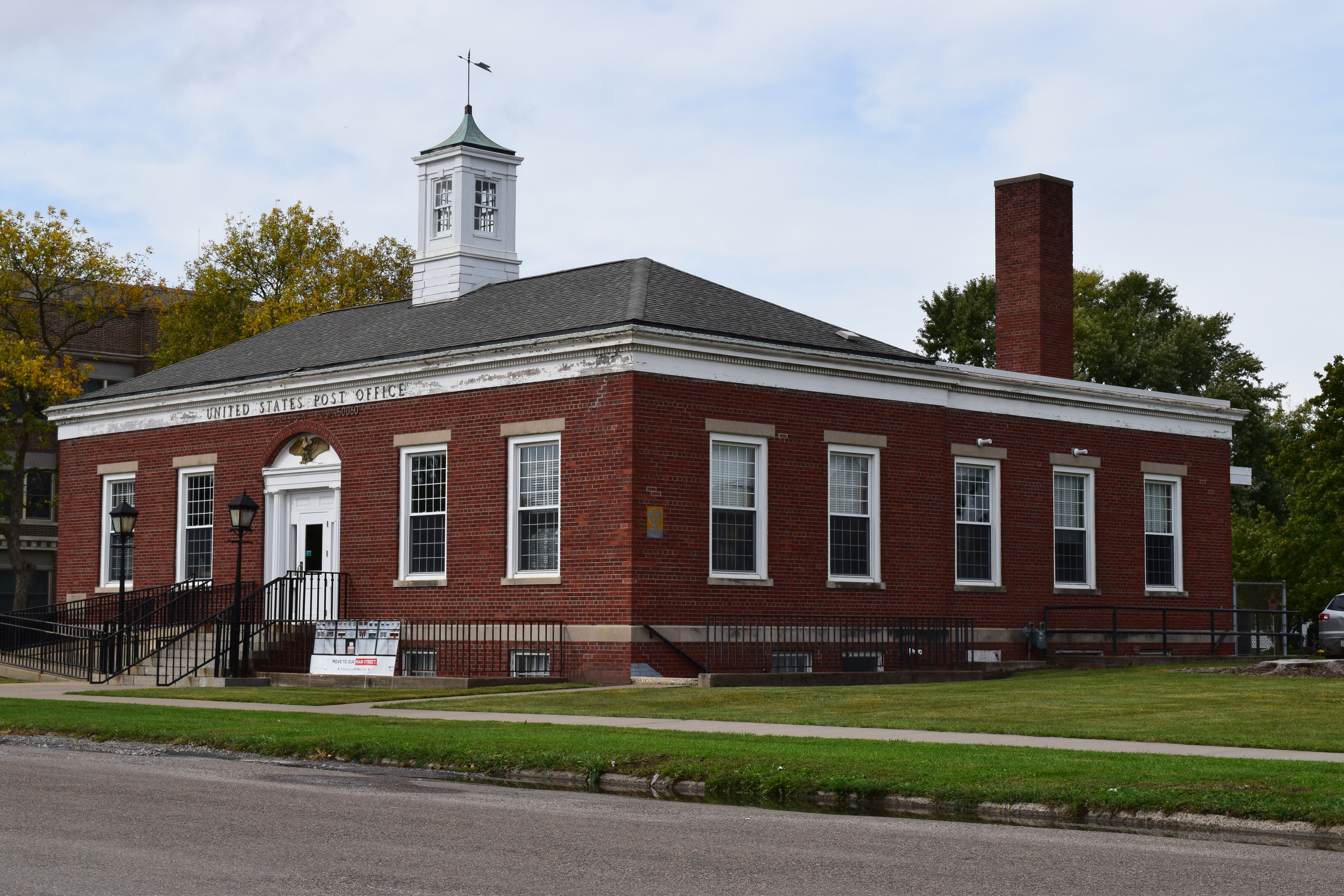
Historic post office in Corydon.

Corydon is a city in Wayne County, Iowa, United States. The population was 1,526 in the 2020 census, a decline from 1,591 in 2000. It is the county seat of Wayne County.

== History ==
The town was laid out and platted in 1851 and later that year designated as the county seat. The town was named by county judge Seth Anderson after his old hometown of Corydon, Indiana.

== Geography ==
According to the United States Census Bureau, the city has a total area of 1.39 square miles (3.60 km^{2}), all land.

== Demographics ==
Historical population
Census	Pop.	Note	%±
1860	254		—
1870	618		143.3%
1880	801		29.6%
1890	962		20.1%
1900	1,477		53.5%
1910	1,669		13.0%
1920	1,867		11.9%
1930	1,768		−5.3%
1940	1,872		5.9%
1950	1,870		−0.1%
1960	1,687		−9.8%
1970	1,745		3.4%
1980	1,818		4.2%
1990	1,675		−7.9%
2000	1,591		−5.0%
2010	1,585		−0.4%
2020	1,526		−3.7%
U.S. Decennial Census

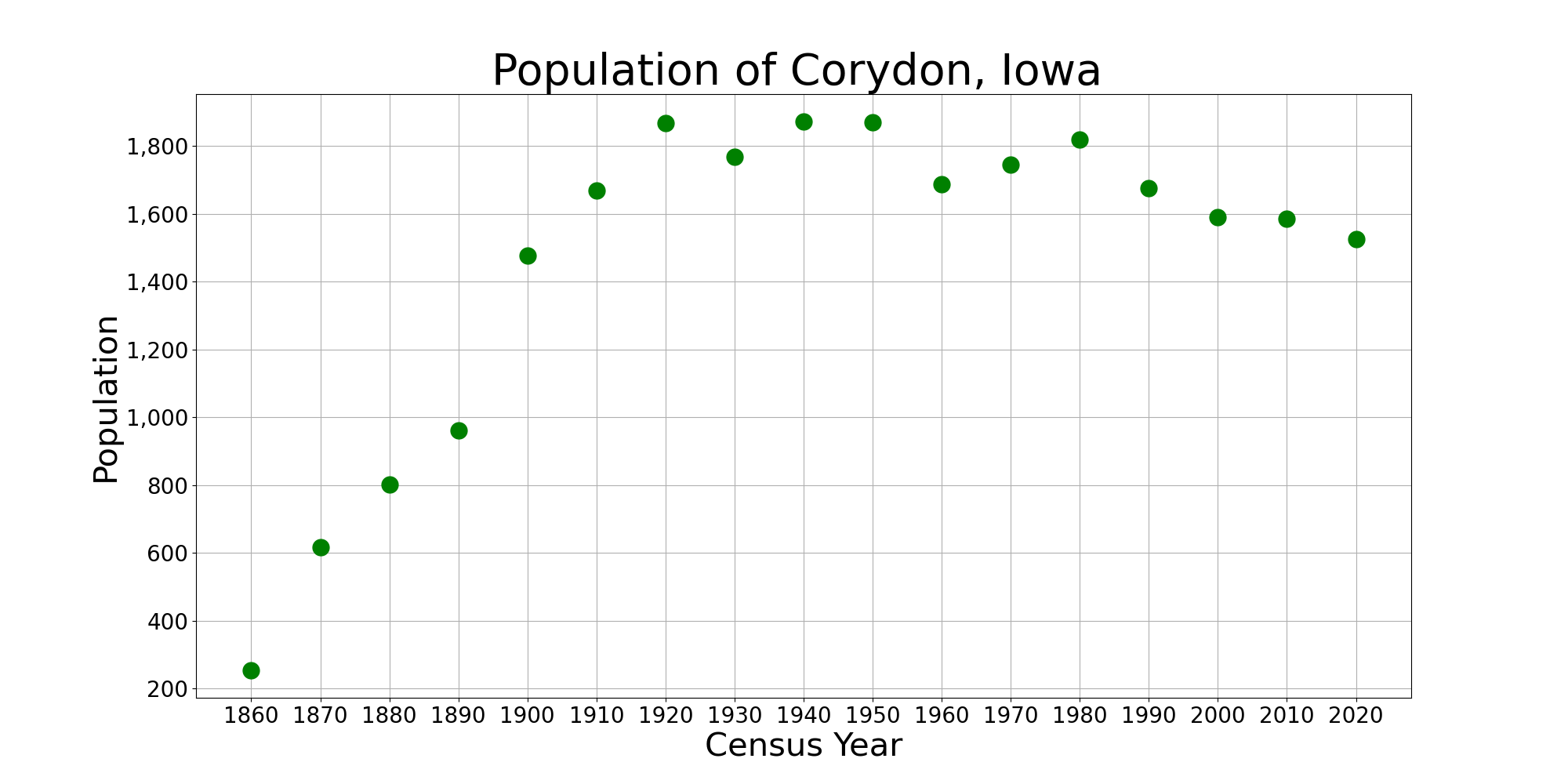
The population of Corydon, Iowa from US census data

=== 2020 census ===
As of the 2020 census, there were 1,526 people, 653 households, and 372 families residing in the city. The population density was 1,131.0 inhabitants per square mile (436.7/km^{2}). There were 761 housing units at an average density of 564.0 per square mile (217.8/km^{2}).

The median age was 43.1 years. 20.8% of residents were under the age of 18 and 25.3% were 65 years of age or older. 23.1% of residents were under the age of 20; 4.1% were between the ages of 20 and 24; 24.8% were from 25 to 44; and 22.8% were from 45 to 64. For every 100 females, there were 83.0 males, and for every 100 females age 18 and over there were 77.6 males age 18 and over.

Of the 653 households, 25.4% had children under the age of 18 living in them. Of all households, 42.4% were married-couple households, 7.7% were cohabiting-couple households, 17.0% were households with a male householder and no spouse or partner present, and 32.9% were households with a female householder and no spouse or partner present. About 43.0% of all households were non-families, 36.3% were made up of individuals, and 18.9% had someone living alone who was 65 years of age or older.

Of all housing units, 14.2% were vacant. The homeowner vacancy rate was 1.3% and the rental vacancy rate was 7.8%. 0.0% of residents lived in urban areas, while 100.0% lived in rural areas.

Racial composition as of the 2020 census
Race	Number	Percent
White	1,472	96.5%
Black or African American	6	0.4%
American Indian and Alaska Native	4	0.3%
Asian	4	0.3%
Native Hawaiian and Other Pacific Islander	1	0.1%
Some other race	5	0.3%
Two or more races	34	2.2%
Hispanic or Latino (of any race)	14	0.9%

=== 2010 census ===
As of the census of 2010, there were 1,585 people, 680 households, and 411 families residing in the city. The population density was 1,140.3 inhabitants per square mile (440.3/km^{2}). There were 785 housing units at an average density of 564.7 per square mile (218.0/km^{2}). The racial makeup of the city was 99.0% White, 0.1% African American, 0.2% Native American, 0.1% Asian, 0.2% from other races, and 0.5% from two or more races. Hispanic or Latino of any race were 0.4% of the population.

There were 680 households, of which 26.8% had children under the age of 18 living with them, 47.1% were married couples living together, 9.1% had a female householder with no husband present, 4.3% had a male householder with no wife present, and 39.6% were non-families. 34.7% of all households were made up of individuals, and 21.6% had someone living alone who was 65 years of age or older. The average household size was 2.20 and the average family size was 2.82.

The median age in the city was 46.7 years. 20.6% of residents were under the age of 18; 9% were between the ages of 18 and 24; 18.1% were from 25 to 44; 24.6% were from 45 to 64; and 27.7% were 65 years of age or older. The gender makeup of the city was 45.9% male and 54.1% female.

=== 2000 census ===
As of the census of 2000, there were 1,591 people, 718 households, and 432 families residing in the city. The population density was 1,144.3 inhabitants per square mile (441.8/km^{2}). There were 802 housing units at an average density of 576.8 per square mile (222.7/km^{2}). The racial makeup of the city was 99.43% White, 0.06% African American, 0.06% Asian, 0.13% Pacific Islander, and 0.31% from two or more races. Hispanic or Latino of any race were 0.19% of the population.

There were 718 households, out of which 22.7% had children under the age of 18 living with them, 49.3% were married couples living together, 8.1% had a female householder with no husband present, and 39.7% were non-families. 38.0% of all households were made up of individuals, and 24.8% had someone living alone who was 65 years of age or older. The average household size was 2.10 and the average family size was 2.73.

Age spread: 20.7% under the age of 18, 6.1% from 18 to 24, 19.5% from 25 to 44, 21.7% from 45 to 64, and 31.9% who were 65 years of age or older. The median age was 48 years. For every 100 females, there were 82.5 males. For every 100 females age 18 and over, there were 76.9 males.

The median income for a household in the city was $28,542, and the median income for a family was $40,231. Males had a median income of $31,250 versus $18,523 for females. The per capita income for the city was $17,496. About 9.7% of families and 12.1% of the population were below the poverty line, including 14.2% of those under age 18 and 15.4% of those age 65 or over.

== Arts and culture ==
The Prairie Trails Museum of Wayne County houses 25,000 artifacts in five galleries covering over 21,000 sq ft (2,000 m^{2}), and a large barn with farm antiques. Permanent exhibits include a tribute to the Mormon Trail and depiction of the Ocobock Bank in Corydon along with the original safe that was robbed by Jesse James and other members of the James-Younger Gang on June 3, 1871.

The Corydon post office contains a mural entitled Volunteer Fire Department, painted in 1942 by Marion Gilmore. Murals were produced from 1934 to 1943 in the United States through the Section of Painting and Sculpture, later called the Section of Fine Arts, of the Treasury Department.

== Education ==
Wayne Community School District operates public schools serving the community.

== Infrastructure ==
=== Transportation ===
Corydon is served by Iowa Highways 2 and 14 which make up the southern, eastern and northeastern portion of the town square.

Rail service through Corydon is provided by the Union Pacific Railroad. Since the Union Pacific merged with the Chicago and North Western Railway (C&NW) in 1995, there has been a considerable increase in rail traffic on the line. The line was originally the Rock Island's Short line from Allerton to Minneapolis. After the Rock Island ceased operations, its main track between Kansas City and Allerton was combined with the Short Line to form C&NW's "Spine Line" between Kansas City and Minneapolis and that designation has been retained by Union Pacific. The Rock Island depot was removed in the late 1950s with passenger service provided through Allerton, six miles to the southwest until about 1970.

Corydon was also served by the CB&Q Railroad. The line originally was the Keokuk & Western line from Humeston in the northwest part of Wayne County through Corydon, Promise City, Centerville and into northeastern Missouri. It then became part of the Chicago, Burlington and Quincy Railroad. The line was abandoned between Corydon and Centerville in 1958. The line was completely abandoned from Corydon to Humeston in the early 1970s. Depot service was maintained until abandonment, the last few years by a mobile depot that serviced Humeston, Mt. Ayr, Corydon, and Leon on set days of the week. The CB&Q and Rock Island depots in Corydon were just 1/4 mile apart, with the Rock Island depot being on Depot Street at the end of Greeley Street. The Burlington depot still existed as a warehouse into the 2010s but has been razed.

== Notable people ==
- Hiram K. Evans (1863–1941), U.S. representative from Iowa
- Karl M. LeCompte (1887–1972), U.S. representative from Iowa
- Katherine Marlowe, film actress, most notably in the film Dodsworth
- George Saling (1909–1933), 1932 Summer Olympics gold medal winner
