= Jefferson Township, Wayne County, Iowa =

Township in Wayne County, Iowa, U.S.

Coordinates: 40.6815°N 93.4994°W

Jefferson Township is a township in Wayne County, Iowa, USA.

== History ==
Jefferson Township is named for Thomas Jefferson.
