= 1937 Melrose High School (Iowa) Shamrocks =

High school basketball team season

The 1937 Melrose High School (Iowa) Shamrocks were the Iowa state high school basketball champions. With an enrollment of only 66, the Melrose Shamrocks were the smallest school ever to win a single-class state basketball title in Iowa. The team finished their season 33–0, the first undefeated boys basketball team in Iowa history. In 2012, the Des Moines Register recognized the Shamrocks as one of the ten best State tournament teams in Iowa history. In May 2012, the Iowa House of Representatives officially congratulated the 1937 Melrose Shamrocks basketball team on the 75th anniversary of their championship.

== Background ==
In 1937, the Iowa High School Athletic Association held a single tournament to determine the boys' basketball championship. Eight larger schools (Class A schools) and eight small schools (Class B schools) were invited to the tournament. Although the large Class A schools were favored, several small schools won the state championship during this era, including Dunkerton in 1933, Melrose in 1937, and Diagonal in 1938.

Melrose High School did not have a gym for the 1937 team to use or for its home games. Instead, they used the floor of the town opera house. The court measured 30 feet (9.1 meters) in width by 40 to 45 feet (12 to 14 meters) in length. One corner of the playing floor featured a pot-belly wood stove, which heated the building. The circles around the foul lines intersected the circle at center court. The Melrose opera house floor was less than 30 percent the size of the Drake University Fieldhouse floor, where the State tournament was played. That floor measured 50 by 94 feet (15 by 29 meters).

During the 1937 season, the teams had a center jump ball after each score. This allowed teams with a tall center, like Melrose, to control the tempo of a game. It would also allow a team that was behind to more easily rally as the players could regain possession of the ball after each basket. The Iowa High School Athletic Association, like other associations, changed this rule after the 1937 season to its current rule.

The Melrose coach was Adolph "Ad" Hlubek, the school superintendent. He told people that he learned most of what he knew about coaching basketball from a 10 cent paperback book. He also said that he learned the sliding zone defense they used from a friend in Kansas.

== The 1936–37 Season ==
=== Team roster ===
The team roster had only one change during the 1936–37 season. Freshman Bernard Lee joined the team part way through the season when Dan Ryan had to quit to help out at home.

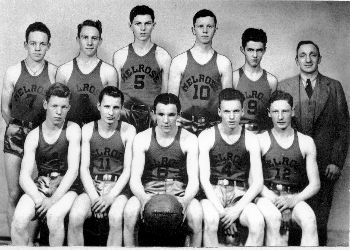
1937 Melrose Basketball Team Front: Robert Parks, George Pavlik, Walt O'Connor, Jim Carr, Mike Kasper. Back: Ray Parks, Ed Callahan, Jim Thynne, Ray Navin, Bernard Lee, Coach Ad Hlubek

Player	Year	Position
Walt O'Connor	Senior	Forward
Jim Thynne	Sophomore	Center
Ray Parks	Junior	Guard
Jim Carr	Junior	Forward/Guard
Mike Kasper	Sophomore	Forward
Ed Callahan	Sophomore	Guard
Ray Navin	Senior	Center
George Pavlik	Senior	Guard
Robert Parks	Senior	Forward
Bernard Lee	Freshman	Guard

Coach: Adolph "Ad" Hlubek

=== Schedule ===
The Shamrock's season consisted of a regular season and five tournaments. The tournaments included the Monroe County tournament, the Chariton Valley Conference tournament, the sectional and district qualifying tournaments, and the State tournament.

Regular Season

Team	Score	Team	Score
Melrose	23	Bussey	18
Melrose	25	Bussey	24
Melrose	31	Albia	27
Melrose	33	Williamson	13
Melrose	39	Derby	21
Melrose	66	Lucas	28
Melrose	56	Hiteman	39
Melrose	64	Russell	32
Melrose	62	Lovilia	24
Melrose	45	Hiteman	11
Melrose	39	Williamson	34
Melrose	34	Russell	18
Melrose	65	Lucas	10
Melrose	54	Central Catholic	18
Melrose	49	Derby	26
Melrose	37	Rathbun	34
Melrose	35	Lovilia	20
Melrose	37	Central Catholic	20

Melrose finished the regular season with a 19–0 record, having outscored their opponents 794–417. The team had two close games at the beginning of the season, when their center Jim Thynne was out with broken ribs. The other big test for the Shamrocks in the regular season was the game against Rathbun. Melrose trailed 34–28 with 1:45 to play. They rallied and scored nine straight points to win the game.

Monroe County Tournament

Team	Score	Team	Score
Melrose	37	Albia Frosh-Sophomore	18
Melrose	34	Hiteman	23

Chariton Valley Tournament

Team	Score	Team	Score
Melrose	47	Cambria	14
Melrose	39	Williamson	20
Melrose	37	Russell	15

Sectional Tournament

Team	Score	Team	Score
Melrose	28	Hiteman	19
Melrose	34	Derby	15
Melrose	26	Blakesburg	25

District Tournament

Team	Score	Team	Score
Melrose	42	Hillsboro	20
Melrose	37	Douds	17
Melrose	30	Martinsburg	20

State Tournament

Team	Score	Team	Score
Melrose	35	Geneseo	34
Melrose	20	Newton	15
Melrose	29	Rolfe	13
Melrose	35	Marshalltown	17

Melrose finished the season with a 33–0 record and outscored their opponents 1,304–702.

== 1937 Iowa High School Athletic Association Boys Basketball Tournament ==
The 1937 State tournament was held in the Drake University Fieldhouse from Thursday, March 18, 1937, to Saturday, March 20, 1937. The tournament used a single elimination format with the semifinal and final games held on the same day.

=== Qualifiers ===
The following teams qualified for the State tournament from the various sectional tournaments around the State.

Class A	Class B
Centerville	Blencoe
Clarinda	Bronson
Davenport	Delhi
Marshalltown	Geneseo
Newton	Maloy
Rolfe	Melrose
Sioux City East	Mitchellville
Waterloo East	Ottosen

=== Lead Up to the Finals ===
Melrose vs. Geneseo The first test for Melrose was Geneseo Consolidated. Melrose dominated early in the first half, but Geneseo stormed back and took the lead in the second half. Melrose was down four points with 3:30 to go in the game, but rallied to win the game 35–34. The final basket came after Walt O'Connor made a floor-length pass to Jim Thynne who then made a sensational shot. Some of the Melrose players had problems handling the ball in the first half because their hands were slippery from the hair grease they put on to impress the big city crowd. They cleaned their hands at half time and did not have the same problem in the second half.

Melrose vs. Newton Newton was a much larger school than Melrose. Newton's enrollment of 1,426 dwarfed the Melrose enrollment of 66 and far surpassed the population of the entire town of Melrose, which was only 420 people. Melrose played tight defense and defeated the heavily favored Newton team 20–15. Melrose defeated Newton by playing only five players (Walt O'Connor, Jim Thynne, Jim Carr, Ray Parks, and Ed Callahan).

Semifinal Game: Melrose vs. Rolfe The semifinal game of Melrose versus Rolfe pitted the tournament's remaining two undefeated teams. Melrose entered the game with a 31–0 record. Rolfe brought a 29–0 record into the match. Although Rolfe was favored, Melrose easily beat them 29–13.

=== Final Game: Melrose vs. Marshalltown ===
After the semifinal games were over in the afternoon, the players on both Melrose and Marshalltown had to prepare for the finals that night. The teams played in front of a sold-out crowd of 7,800 fans in the Drake University Fieldhouse.

Marshalltown was heavily favored. Not only was Marshalltown High School much bigger than Melrose High School (1,077 vs. 66), but the Marshalltown team was one of the pre-tournament favorites. The game was close at the half, with Melrose leading 14–12. However, Melrose dominated the second half to win easily 35–17. The 18–point win was the largest margin of victory for any championship team up to that point.

Melrose beat Marshalltown by playing only five players (Walt O'Connor, Jim Thynne, Jim Carr, Ray Parks, and Mike Kasper). Coach Hlubek stated afterwards that he was so excited it did not occur to him to substitute some of the other players into the game when they had a big lead. O'Connor, Thynne, and Parks were named to the tournament all-star teams.

== Aftermath ==
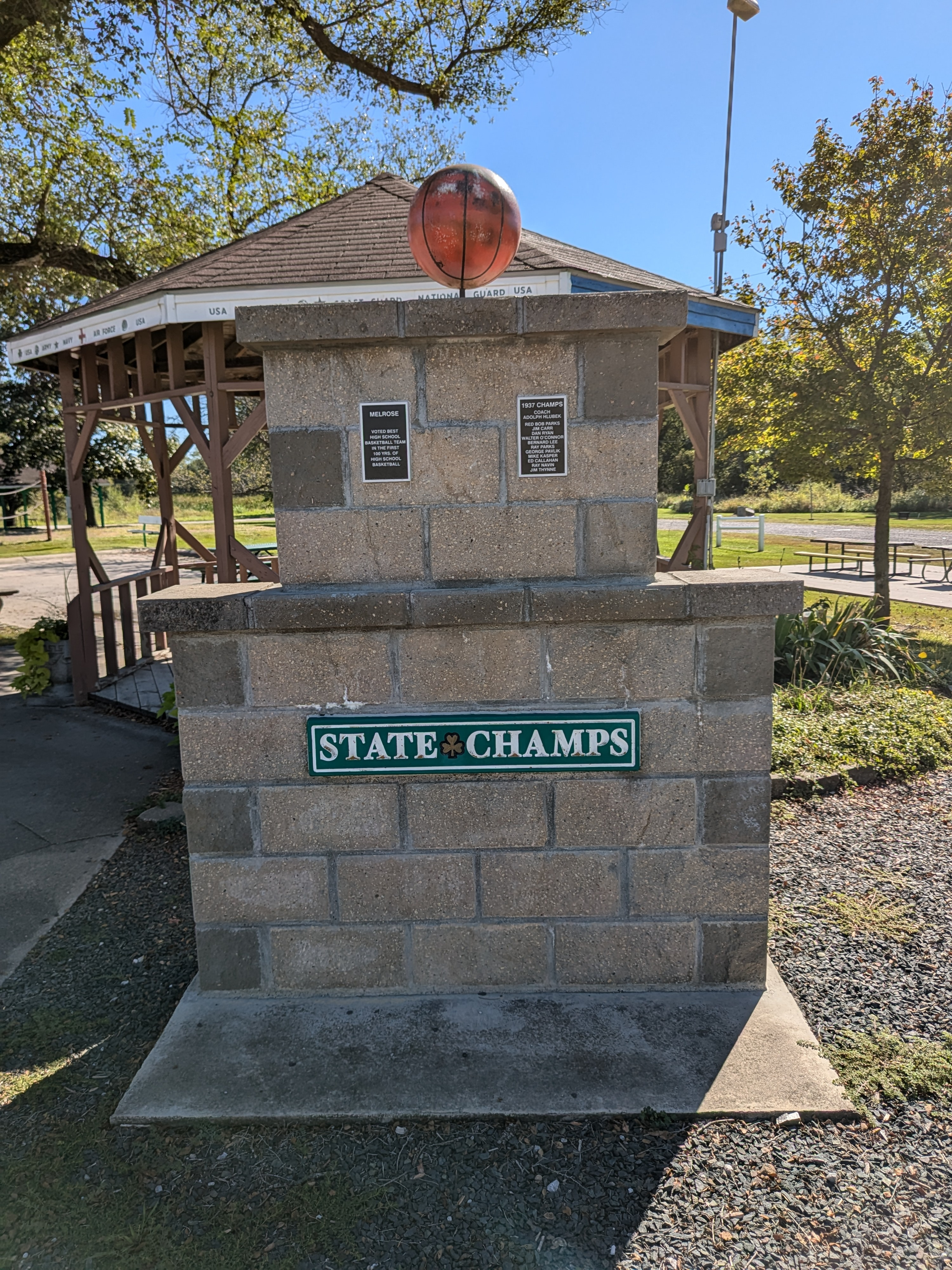
A monument in Melrose, commemorating the team.

When the team returned to Melrose on Sunday, it kicked off a large celebration. The team was celebrated around the State of Iowa, not only because they were a small school that defeated many large schools, but also because they were the first Iowa high school team to have an undefeated season.

Years later, Walt O'Connor and Jim Thynne were inducted into the Iowa High School Athletic Association Hall of Fame. O'Connor went on to play three sports for Drake University and was named the "outstanding Iowa amateur" for 1940 by the Amateur Athletic Association and was inducted into the Des Moines Register's Iowa Sports Hall of Fame in 1980. O'Connor was also named to the Drake University All-Century Basketball team. In March 2012, the Iowa High School Athletic Association inducted Coach Ad Hlubek into the Hall of Fame as a coach.

In May 2012, the Iowa House of Representatives officially congratulated the 1937 Melrose Shamrocks basketball team on the 75th anniversary of their championship. The resolution recounted the accomplishments of the 1937 team and encouraged "all Iowans to follow its example in striving to accomplish goals that seem impossible." In late 2012, the city of Melrose erected a monument in the center of town honoring the 1937 basketball team and its selection in a Des Moines Register poll as the top team in the first 100 years of boys’ basketball in Iowa.
