= Norwood, Iowa =

- Unincorporated community
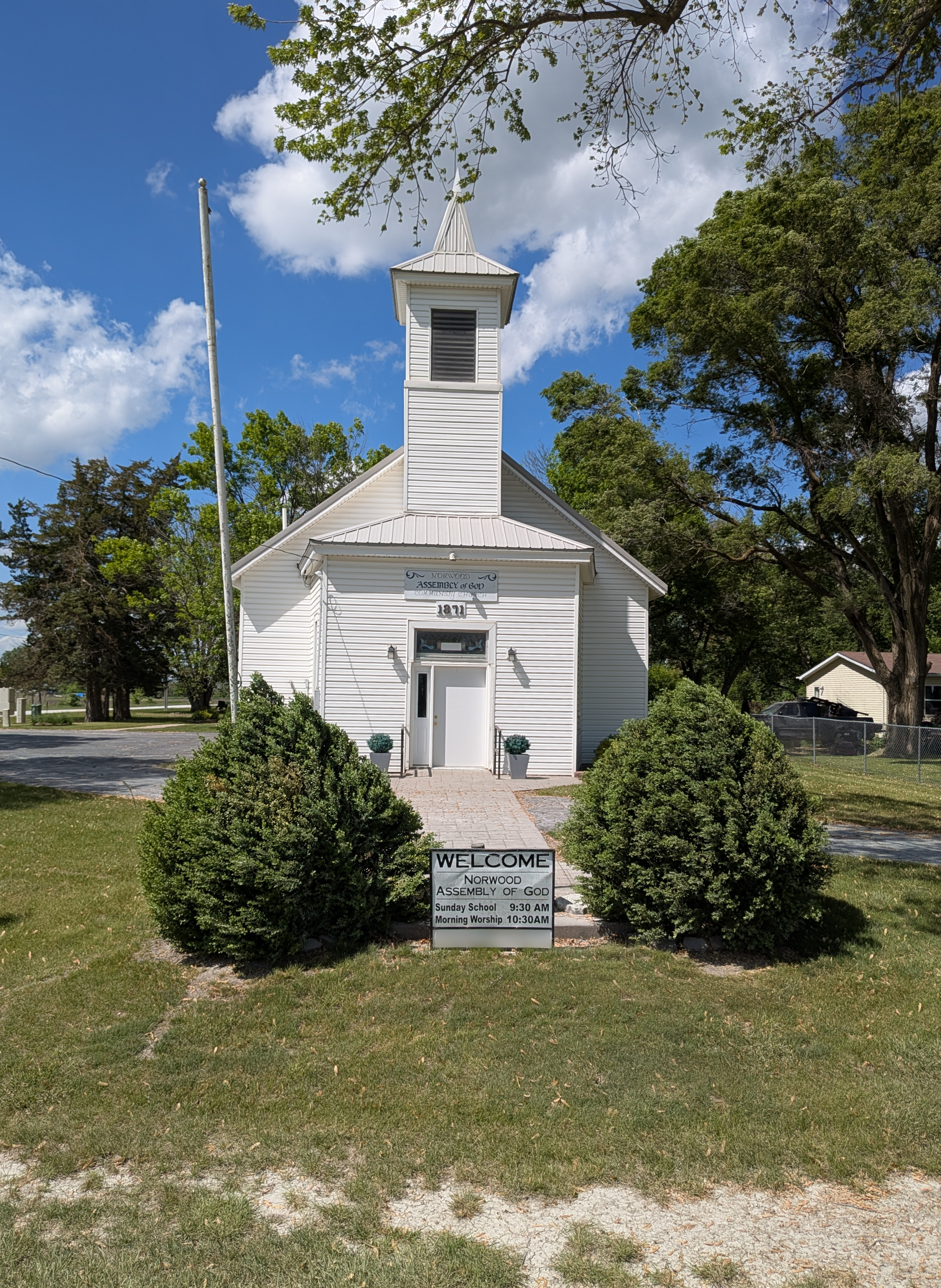
- Assembly of God church in Norwood

- Location within Iowa Location within the United States
- Coordinates: 41°07′00″N 93°28′44″W
- Country: United States
- State: Iowa
- County: Lucas
- Township: Otter Creek
- Elevation: 1,040 ft (320 m)
- Time zone: UTC-6 (Central (CST))
  - Summer (DST): UTC-5 (CDT)
- Area code: 641
- GNIS feature ID: 459672

Norwood is an unincorporated community in Otter Creek Township, Lucas County, Iowa, United States. Norwood is located along U.S. Route 65, 6.2 miles (10.0 km) north of Lucas.

== History ==
Norwood's population was 31 in 1902, and was 50 in 1925. The population was 35 in 1940.
