= Jackson Township, Iowa =

Jackson Township is the name of thirty-two townships in Iowa:

- Jackson Township, Adair County
- Jackson Township, Benton County
- Jackson Township, Boone County
- Jackson Township, Bremer County
- Jackson Township, Butler County
- Jackson Township, Calhoun County
- Jackson Township, Clarke County
- Jackson Township, Crawford County
- Jackson Township, Des Moines County
- Jackson Township, Greene County
- Jackson Township, Guthrie County
- Jackson Township, Hardin County
- Jackson Township, Harrison County
- Jackson Township, Henry County
- Jackson Township, Jackson County
- Jackson Township, Jones County
- Jackson Township, Keokuk County
- Jackson Township, Lee County
- Jackson Township, Linn County
- Jackson Township, Lucas County
- Jackson Township, Madison County
- Jackson Township, Monroe County
- Jackson Township, Poweshiek County
- Jackson Township, Sac County
- Jackson Township, Shelby County
- Jackson Township, Taylor County
- Jackson Township, Van Buren County
- Jackson Township, Warren County
- Jackson Township, Washington County
- Jackson Township, Wayne County
- Jackson Township, Webster County
- Jackson Township, Winneshiek County

== See also ==
- Jackson Township (disambiguation)
