= St. Joseph's Catholic Church (Bauer, Iowa) =

- St. Joseph's Roman Catholic Church and Cemetery Historic District
- U.S. National Register of Historic Places
- U.S. Historic district
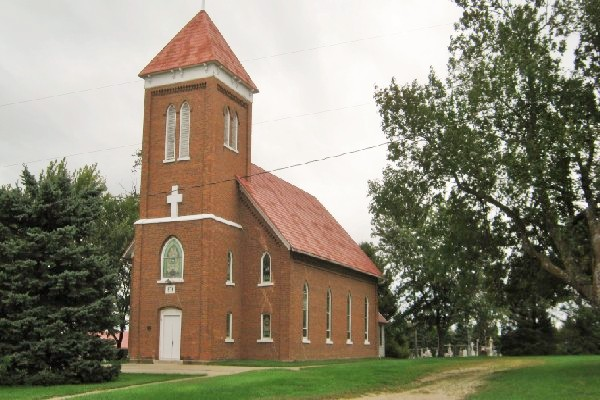

- Location within Iowa Location within the United States
- Location: 1 mile east of the junction of County Road G76 and SE 97th Street, Lacona, Iowa
- Coordinates: 41°12′12″N 93°18′29″W
- Area: 2 acres (0.81 ha)
- Built: 1876
- Architectural style: Romanesque Revival; Late Gothic Revival
- NRHP reference No.: 94001580
- Added to NRHP: January 24, 1995

St. Joseph's Catholic Church is a former parish of the Diocese of Davenport. The church is located in Dallas Township in the unincorporated community of Bauer, somewhat close to the ghost town of Newbern, both of which are in rural Marion County, Iowa, United States. The closest communities besides Bauer are the cities of Melcher-Dallas and Lacona. The church building still stands and together with the adjacent cemetery comprises an historic district listed on the National Register of Historic Places.

== History ==
St. Joseph's was founded in 1853 to serve German immigrants in a place in western Marion County called Newbern, or New Bern. The unincorporated village that was built around the church was later called Bauer after the family name of the area's earliest German settlers. The parish was founded in the Diocese of Dubuque during the episcopate of Bishop Mathias Loras. The church building was built in 1876 under the leadership of Bishop John Hennessy. Initially, the parish did not have a resident priest and was served by priests located at St. Patrick’s in Georgetown. Its first two church buildings were log structures that were built on the same property of the present church. The Rev. John Baumann was assigned as the first resident parish priest. The first rectory was built in 1873.

Baumann blessed the cornerstone for the present church on October 3, 1875, and the Rev. S. Cann preached a sermon. Limestone, which is abundant in this area, was from a quarry located southeast of the church and used for the foundation. The clay for the bricks was excavated from the property, and the bricks were formed and fired on site under the direction of parishioner Jacob Metz. Other members of the parish built the building. The finished church building was dedicated in 1876. Shortly after the church was built Father Wieland replaced Baumann as pastor. The high altar and the altar of the Blessed Virgin Mary were created by Buscher & Kramer and installed in 1880. The Saint Joseph altar was installed sometime later. The pews were installed the following year, as were the bells in the tower. The bells were produced by J. G. Struckstede and Brother of St. Louis, Missouri. Bells are dedicated to the honor of the saints (Ad Honorem Sts.) and St. Joseph (Sancta Joseph). In 1881 the parish became part of the Davenport Diocese when it was established. A reed organ built by the Estey Organ Company of Brattleboro, Vermont was installed around 1900. The plaster Stations of the Cross were added in 1916.

Other parishes were founded from Bauer in Melcher, Knoxville, Rose Mount, and Lacona. German remained the language used for sermons and church services, when Latin was not required, until March 1913 during the pastorate of the Rev. Charles Dohrmann. The younger members of the parish had insisted up until that time that at least some of the sermons be preached in English. That same year a new rectory was built across the road from the church. It is a 2½-story, frame, American Foursquare dwelling. As the 20th century progressed the German population at Bauer became more aligned with the mainstream American culture and the influence of ethnic traditions was reduced. As the numbers of clergy started to decline, St. Joseph’s lost its resident priest in 1969 and it was clustered with other parishes. The rectory was sold in 1972 and remains in place as a private home. The number of parishioners declined as well and the parish was closed in the 1990s.

== Parochial school ==
The parish supported a school that was begun as late as 1877 with a lay teacher. Eventually the school was staffed by the School Sisters of St. Francis from Milwaukee. A 2½ story, frame, school building and convent, no longer extant, was built in 1904 to the north of the church.

St. Joseph's was one of seven parochial schools in the Davenport Diocese that operated as public schools. All of these areas were predominantly Catholic, nearly 100%. In the early 20th century the state of Iowa required all districts to have a school. Parochial schools fulfilled the requirement. Funds were used to pay at least some of the Sister’s salaries, books (except for religion), equipment and other items per the contract with the state. In Bauer, the salary that was paid to the Sisters was so low that the superintendent chose not to report it so as to not bring down the salary level of the other teachers in the district. A map was the only piece of equipment that was provided, and $50 a year was provided for coal to heat the school. Starting in 1937 lawsuits were brought against the districts challenging their legal right to employ the Sisters. The District Court upheld the practice, but the state Supreme Court overturned the decision and left it open for a retrial. The case was dropped as was one in 1941. While the state could not restrict employing teachers based on their religious beliefs, they could restrict what they wore. The Sisters continued to wear their habits, but they removed their rosaries and reliquaries. In 1953 the state legislature passed a law that refused state aid to these parish-based schools. The school at St. Joseph’s became a parochial school and remained open until 1964. After the school was discontinued the building remained on the church grounds into the 1990s and served as a parish hall and local community center.

== Architecture ==
St. Joseph's Church is a 60-by-41-foot (18 by 12 m) brick structure built on a limestone foundation. It is rectangular in shape and its main facade is dominated by a square tower that projects from it. The tower is divided into two sections by a course of stone that is surmounted by a large stone cross. It is capped by a hip roof and a cross. Brick corbelling is found underneath the eaves of the west, north, and south elevations of the building, and around the top of the bell chamber. The corbelling on the main facade (west elevation) is laid on a diagonal, parallel to the slope of the gabled roof. The east elevation does not have corbelling, but features instead double rose windows with the lower window being somewhat larger. While the upper window cannot be seen on the interior, its original mullions remain in place. The side elevations feature four lancet windows that are evenly spaced. Metal shingles cover the roof of the nave. A single-story, frame sacristy protrudes from the east wall of the church. It is a later addition to the larger structure.

The altar platform is located on the east end of the interior. The high altar is no longer extant, but the side altars remain in place. The pews are organized in four sections across the width of the nave, with three aisles separating them. Some of the original pews remain in the gallery, but those of the main floor were added at a later date. The stained glass windows depict the Blessed Virgin Mary, Saint Joseph, Saint Boniface (the apostle to the Germans), Saint Francis of Assisi, Saint Barbara, and Saint Catherine of Siena.

== Cemetery ==
St. Joseph's Cemetery measures 183 by 258 feet (56 by 79 m) with burial plots laid out in a grid pattern. It is located directly east of the church with an entrance on the west side adjacent to the church. An iron gateway arch with the words "St. Joseph's Cemetery" marks the entrance. A pedestrian walk down the middle terminates at an altar towards the center and divides the cemetery into three sections. The altar was built of flagstone on two poured concrete steps. It features a sculpture of the Crucifixion that is about 10 feet (3 m) in height with a cross made out of wood. It is flanked by life-size statues of the Virgin Mary and St. John the Evangelist. The statues are painted metal and are believed to date sometime prior to World War I.

The first five rows in the north section of the cemetery are restricted to the burial of children. There are no restrictions in the rest of the cemetery. The earliest grave markers are from 1851, which was two years before the parish was established. The markers are made from various kinds of stone, notably limestone and granite, and were executed in a variety of styles. One of the more prominent styles include 40 cross-on-stone markers that can be divided into three basic forms. The oldest form is used in seven grave markers. It is a cross-on-tablet marker that consists of a small, tablet-like marker that is surmounted by a stone cross. While they vary in height they are typically 2.5 feet (1 m) high. With 21 examples the cross-on-shaft grave marker is the most popular. They date from the last quarter of the 19th century. This style features a stepped base, a narrow rectangular column, and a carved stone cross at the top. They also vary in height, but several of them measure 5 feet (2 m) in height. The third form is the largest of the three. Called a cross-on-block it consists of a large, rectangular block, that is capped with a cross. They also vary in height, but there are several examples that are 6 feet (2 m) in height. The 12 examples of this style date from the first two decades of the 20th century. There are also variations of this style which include the cross being inscribed on the block itself. A heart is another prominent symbol used on grave markers in the cemetery. It is found prominently in the children's section and on the marker for Sister Columba, the only professed religious buried in the cemetery. There are only a few grave markers that feature urns, which were popular in Victorian cemeteries in Iowa. Noticeably absent are iron cross grave markers that are found in the several German settlements in Iowa.
