= St. Patrick's Catholic Church (Georgetown, Iowa) =

- St. Patrick’s Roman Catholic Church
- U.S. National Register of Historic Places
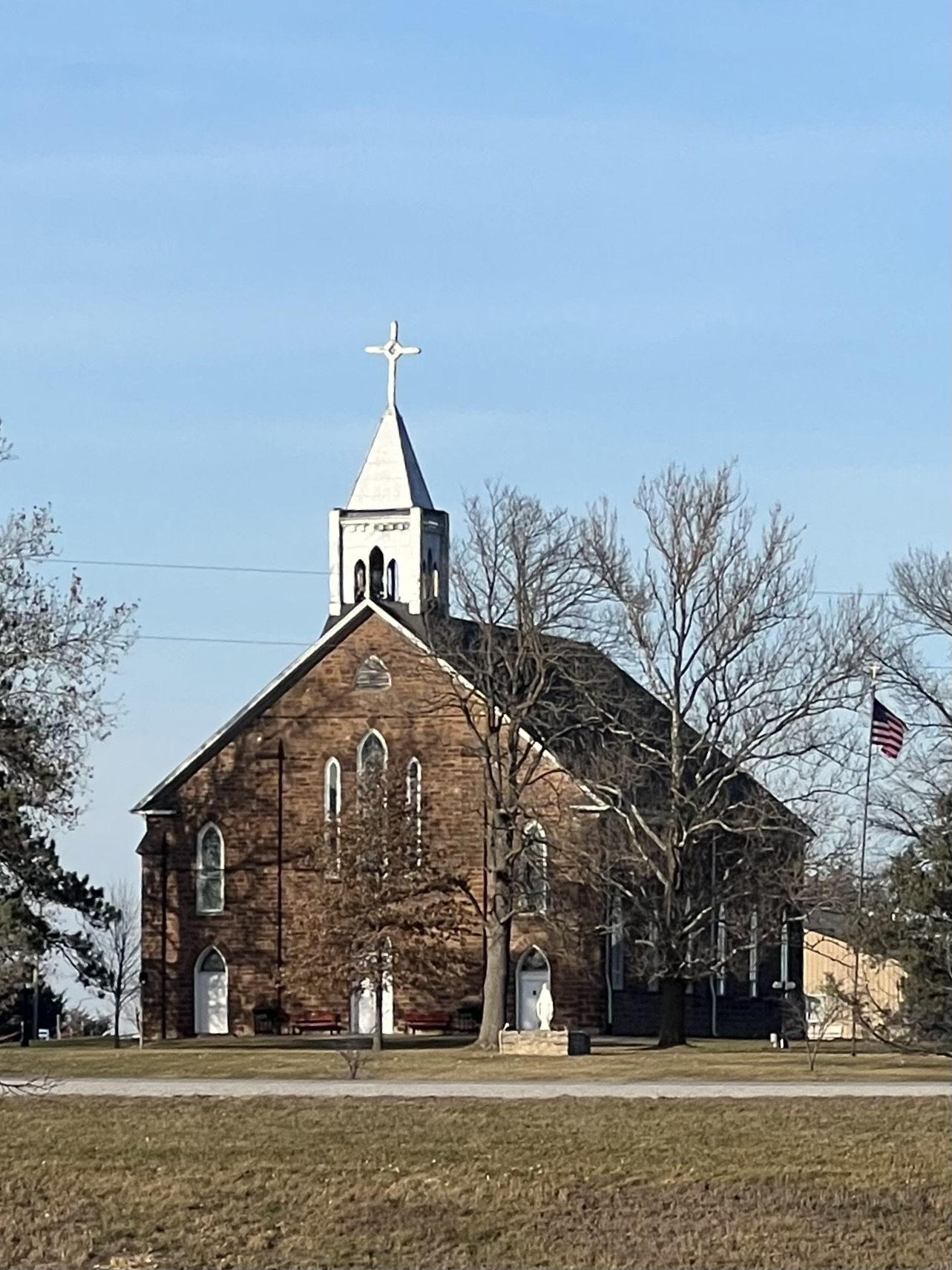
- St Patrick's Church in 2023

- Location within Iowa Location within the United States
- Location: US Highway 34, west of Albia, Iowa
- Coordinates: 41°0′48″N 92°57′20″W
- Area: 1.7 acres (0.69 ha)
- Built: 1865
- Architect: Rev. Timothy Clifford
- Architectural style: Gothic Revival
- NRHP reference No.: 92000426
- Added to NRHP: May 6, 1992

St. Patrick's Catholic Church is a parish of the Diocese of Davenport. The church is located in rural Monroe County, Iowa, United States, on U.S. Highway 34, west of Albia, Iowa. It is located in the unincorporated community that is known as the Irish settlement of Georgetown and is listed on the National Register of Historic Places.

== History ==
=== Foundation ===
The area that would come to be known as Georgetown was settled by people of Irish descent from St. Louis, Missouri and Pennsylvania. Many who settled the area came to build the first railroad west of the Des Moines River and they originally named the settlement Staceyville. At the time the entire state of Iowa was part of the Diocese of Dubuque. The Rev. Jean Villars from Keokuk visited the area starting in 1848 and celebrated Mass in people's homes. In the 1850s the Rev. John Kreckel from St. Mary of the Visitation in Ottumwa started visiting the area monthly until a small log church called St. Gregory's was built in 1851.

As the community grew, in large part because of Irish immigration, a new church building was needed. They decided to build a mile west, closer to the village of Staceyville. Construction on the new St. Gregory's Church was begun in 1860 and completed in 1865, the same year the Rev. Bernard P. McMenomy was assigned to the parish. The American Civil War had delayed construction of the church. The church was designed by the Rev. Timothy Clifford and constructed of brick and sandstone in the Gothic Revival style by Carr & Cullen. The sandstone was quarried by hand from Babb's Quarry a few miles away. The parish became a missionary center in southern Iowa. The pastor visited communities in Afton, Bauer, Chariton, Dutch Settlement, Irish Settlement (Decatur County), Leon, Melrose, Osceola, and Woodburn.

The church was renamed St. Patrick's in 1872 in acknowledgment of the parishioners’ Irish ancestry. Staceyville was renamed Georgetown sometime later. The parish became a part of the Davenport Diocese when it was established in 1881.

The stained glass windows were added to the church in 1892. The small bell tower with a short spire that sits on top of the roof above the main entrance of the church was added in 1903. It houses a bell that the congregation bought in 1896. A renovation of the church's interior from 1905 to 1906 included building an inclined floor, a pressed tin ceiling, new pews, altars, and statues. The pipe organ was installed in the back gallery in 1924.

=== Parochial School ===
The parish supported a school staffed by the Congregation of the Humility of Mary from Ottumwa. It was one of seven parochial schools in the diocese that operated as public schools. All of these areas were predominantly Catholic, nearly 100%. In the early 20th century the state of Iowa required all districts to have a school. Parochial schools fulfilled the requirement. Funds were used to pay at least some of the Sister's salaries, books (except for religion), equipment and other items per the contract with the state. Starting in 1937 lawsuits were brought against the districts challenging their legal right to employ the Sisters. The District Court upheld the practice, but the state Supreme Court overturned the decision and left it open for a retrial. The case was dropped as was one in 1941. While the state could not restrict employing teachers based on their religious beliefs, they could restrict what they wore. The Sisters continued to wear their habits, but they removed their rosaries and reliquaries. In 1953 the state legislature passed a law that refused state aid to these schools. The school at Georgetown chose to replace the Sisters with lay teachers so they could continue to receive financial aid from the state. The school closed in 1959.

=== The Modern era ===
The church building was extensively renovated in the late 1950s. The altar was moved forward and a central heating system was installed. A kitchen and meeting rooms were added to the church's north side. The ceiling was lowered, obscuring the tin ceiling, and new walls and flooring were installed. The side entrances into the church were closed off and replaced with shrines. Running water and electricity were added to the sacristy and social rooms.

Two tornadoes struck St. Patrick's in 1963 and 1969. On both occasions the church's roof was damaged.

As the numbers of clergy started to decline, St. Patrick's lost its resident priest and it was clustered with other parishes in Monroe County. It has been run by a lay Parish Life Coordinator under the direction of a Canonical Pastor since the 1990s. The church building was added to the National Register of Historic Places in 1992.

Other additions to the parish grounds include a memorial garden with a new statue of St. Patrick. It was added in 2002 as a memorial to a former pastor, the Rev. Mark Swanson. A new parish hall was built in 2006.

== Architecture ==
St. Patrick's Church is a 100-by-60-foot (30 by 18 m) sandstone structure. The stones vary in color from beige to brown. They are roughly cut and measure 8 inches (20 cm) to 20 inches (51 cm) in length and 6 inches (15 cm) to 10 inches (25 cm) in width. The main facade features a central, double-door entryway that is flanked by two single-door entryways. The two side entrances were closed in a renovation project between 1959 and 1960. The facade is divided into three bays by four non load-bearing buttresses. Lancet windows are located above all three entryways with three windows located in the central bay. There are six-pointed arch windows located along the east and west elevations of the church. The north elevation features a rose window, which can no longer be seen on the interior because of a dropped ceiling and wall that were added to the church's interior in 1956.
