= Washington Township, Lucas County, Iowa =

Township in Lucas County, Iowa, U.S.

Coordinates: 40.9411°N 93.1628°W

Washington Township is a township in Lucas County, Iowa, USA.

== History ==
Washington Township was established in 1852.
