= Chariton Community School District =

Public school district in Chariton, Iowa, United States

Coordinates: 41.006592°N 93.291264°W

Location
- Chariton, Iowa Lucas County and Marion County United States
- Coordinates: 41.006592, -93.291264

District information
- Type: Public school district
- Grades: K to 12
- Superintendent: Larry Achenbach
- Schools: 4
- Budget: $18,092,000 (2020-21)
- NCES District ID: 1907050

Students and staff
- Students: 1282 (2022-23)
- Teachers: 92.51 FTE
- Staff: 88.20 FTE
- Student–teacher ratio: 13.86
- Athletic conference: South Central
- District mascot: Chargers
- Colors: Red and White

Other information
- Website: www.chariton.k12.ia.us

The Chariton Community School District is a rural public school district headquartered in Chariton, Iowa, USA. The district is mostly within Lucas County; a small portion is in Marion County. Its service area includes Chariton, Lucas, Russell, and Williamson.

== History ==
After the 2008 dissolution of the Russell Community School District, the district absorbed some of the former students of the Russell district.

== Schools ==
The district operates four schools, all in Chariton:

Elementary schools

- Columbus Elementary School
- Van Allen Elementary School

Middle schools

- Chariton Middle School

High schools

- Chariton High School

PreSchools

- Headstart
- Chariton PreSchool
