= Whitebreast Township, Lucas County, Iowa =

Township in Lucas County, Iowa, U.S.

Coordinates: 41.0342°N 93.3806°W

Whitebreast Township is a township in Lucas County, Iowa, USA.

== History ==
Whitebreast Township was established in 1852.
