= Chariton High School =

Public secondary school in Chariton, Iowa, United States

Location
- 501 N. Grand; Chariton, Iowa 50049; United States; 41.019°N 93.307°W

Information
- Type: Public secondary
- School district: Chariton Community School District
- Principal: Tracy Hall
- Teaching staff: 27.74 (FTE)
- Grades: 9–12
- Enrollment: 375 (2023-2024)
- Student to teacher ratio: 13.52
- Campus type: Town: Remote
- Colors: Red and White
- Athletics conference: South Central
- Mascot: Chargers
- Website: www.charitonschools.org/high_school/

Chariton High School is located in Chariton, Iowa, part of the Chariton Community School District.

There are students from six towns including Chariton, Russell, Williamson, Lucas enrolled in the school.

== Athletics ==
Athletic teams of Chariton High School are known as the Chargers. School colors have changed over the years. Currently the school colors are Red and White, though many uniforms are trimmed in silver. The Chargers participate in the South Central Conference in the following sports.

- Football
- Cross Country
  - Boys' 1969 Class A State Champions
- Volleyball
- Basketball
- Wrestling
- Golf
- Tennis
- Track and Field
- Soccer
- Baseball
- Softball

== Notable alumni ==
- Paul Engebretsen, National Football League player
- T. J. Hockenson, National Football League player

== See also ==
- List of high schools in Iowa
