= Belmont Township, Warren County, Iowa =

Township in Warren County, Iowa, U.S.

Coordinates: 41.2913°N 93.3855°W

Belmont Township is a township in Warren County, Iowa, USA.

== History ==
Many early settlers of Belmont Township hailed from Belmont County, Ohio, hence the name. The construction and operation of the railroad led to the founding of Milo within the township, which grew to become a politically separate municipality.
