= Benton Township, Lucas County, Iowa =

Township in Lucas County, Iowa, U.S.

Coordinates: 40.9472°N 93.2714°W

Benton Township is a township in Lucas County, Iowa, United States.

== History ==
Benton Township was organized in 1853. It is named for Thomas Hart Benton, a senator from Missouri.
