= Southeast Warren Community School District =

Public school district in Liberty Center, Iowa, United States

Coordinates: 41.205475°N 93.496271°W

Location
- Liberty Center, Iowa Warren County and Lucas County United States
- Coordinates: 41.205475, -93.496271

District information
- Type: Local school district
- Grades: K-12
- Superintendent: Delane Galvin
- Schools: 3
- Budget: $8,298,000 (2020-21)
- NCES District ID: 1926850

Students and staff
- Students: 455 (2022-23)
- Teachers: 41.65 FTE
- Staff: 62.70 FTE
- Student–teacher ratio: 10.92
- Athletic conference: Pride of Iowa
- District mascot: Warhawks
- Colors: Green and White

Other information
- Website: www.se-warren.k12.ia.us

Southeast Warren Community School District is a rural public school district headquartered in Liberty Center in unincorporated Warren County, Iowa.

The district is mostly in Warren County while there are portions in Lucas County. Incorporated communities in its service area include Lacona and Milo. Unincorporated communities include Liberty Center, which the high school is located near. The district was founded in 1959.

== History ==
It was established in 1959 as a consolidation of the Lacona, Liberty Center, and Milo schools. As of 2018, the district had about 500 students.

In 2015, a veto by the Governor for one-time money added to the state budget cost the district it's librarian due to lack of funds.

== Schools ==
- Southeast Warren Primary School - Milo
- Southeast Warren Intermediate School - Lacona
- Southeast Warren Junior-Senior High School - Liberty Center

=== Southeast Warren Junior-Senior High School ===
==== Athletics ====
The Warhawks compete in the Pride of Iowa Conference in the following sports:

- Football
- Volleyball
- Cross Country
- Basketball
- Wrestling
- Bowling
- Golf
- Track and Field
- Baseball
- Softball
  - 4-time State Champions (1961 (summer), 1961 (fall), 1962 (fall) and 1968 (summer))

== See also ==
- List of school districts in Iowa
- List of high schools in Iowa
