= Lincoln Township, Lucas County, Iowa =

Township in Lucas County, Iowa

Coordinates: 41.0247°N 93.2683°W

- Township
- Elevation: 304 m (997 ft)

Population (2023)
  - Total: 385

Lincoln Township is a township in Lucas County, Iowa, USA. It was established in 1876. As of 2023, the population is 385.
