= Bauer, Iowa =

- Unincorporated community
- Location within Iowa Location within the United States
- Coordinates: 41°12′14″N 93°18′26″W
- Country: United States
- State: Iowa
- County: Marion County
- Time zone: UTC-6 (Central (CST))
  - Summer (DST): UTC-5 (CDT)
- GNIS feature ID: 454390

Bauer is an unincorporated community in Marion County, in the U.S. state of Iowa.

== Geography ==
It is located in the western part of Dallas Township, in the northwest corner of section 20.

== History ==
Bauer was founded in the 1800s; no plat was ever recorded. By 1919, Bauer was "a little hamlet in the western part of Dallas Township, about twenty miles southwest of Knoxville".

Bauer was named for a local settler. It grew up around St. Joseph's Catholic Church, which was founded in Bauer in 1853 and is now on the National Register of Historic Places. St. Joseph's Catholic School of Bauer was founded in 1904. By 1919, it had 72 students.

The community's population was 20 in 1890, 25 in 1900, and 20 in 1920.

== See also ==
- Tracy, Iowa
