= English Township, Lucas County, Iowa =

Township in Lucas County, Iowa, U.S.

Coordinates: 41.1181°N 93.2714°W

English Township is a township in Lucas County, Iowa, United States.

== History ==
English Township was established in 1852.
