= Cedar Township, Lucas County, Iowa =

Township in Lucas County, Iowa, U.S.

Coordinates: 41.0303°N 93.1558°W

Cedar Township is a township in Lucas County, Iowa, United States.

== History ==
Cedar Township was established in 1852.
