= Milo, Iowa =

City in Warren County, Iowa, US

- City
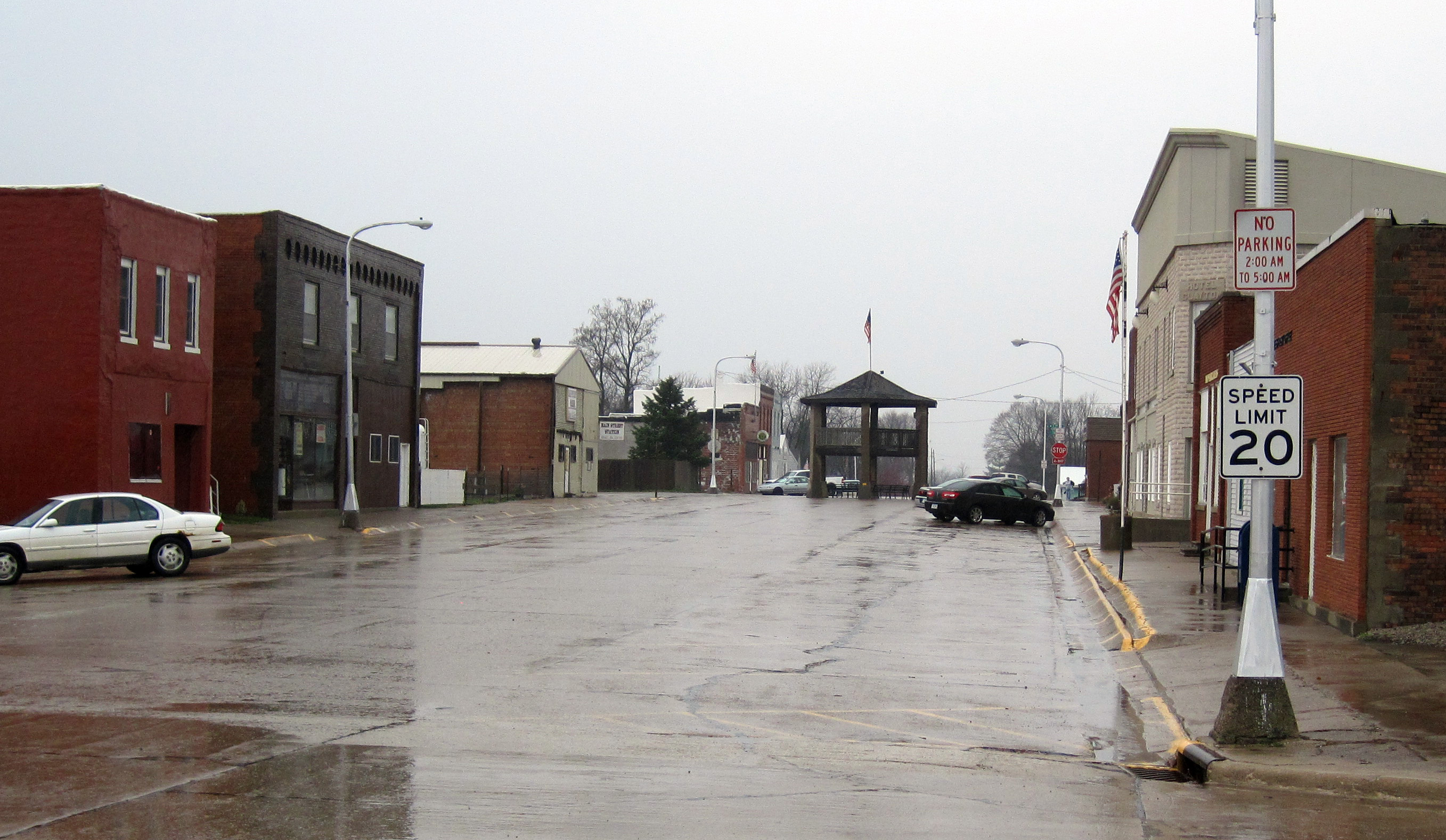
- Streetside in Milo

- Location of Milo, Iowa
- Coordinates: 41°17′21″N 93°26′25″W
- Country: US
- State: Iowa
- County: Warren

Area
  - Total: 0.61 sq mi (1.57 km^{2})
  - Land: 0.61 sq mi (1.57 km^{2})
  - Water: 0 sq mi (0.00 km^{2})
- Elevation: 968 ft (295 m)

Population (2020)
  - Total: 778
  - Density: 1,279.5/sq mi (494.01/km^{2})
- Time zone: UTC-6 (Central (CST))
  - Summer (DST): UTC-5 (CDT)
- ZIP code: 50166
- Area code: 641
- FIPS code: 19-52455
- GNIS feature ID: 2395333
- Website: cityofmilo.com

Milo is a city in Warren County, Iowa, United States. The population was 778 at the time of the 2020 census. It is part of the Des Moines–West Des Moines Metropolitan Statistical Area.

== History ==
Milo had its start in the year 1878 by the building of the railroad through Belmont Township.

== Geography ==
According to the United States Census Bureau, the city has a total area of 0.62 square miles (1.61 km^{2}), all of it land.

== Demographics ==
Historical populations
Year	Pop.	±%
1880	100	—
1890	318	+218.0%
1900	585	+84.0%
1910	519	−11.3%
1920	560	+7.9%
1930	542	−3.2%
1940	528	−2.6%
1950	525	−0.6%
1960	468	−10.9%
1970	561	+19.9%
1980	778	+38.7%
1990	864	+11.1%
2000	839	−2.9%
2010	775	−7.6%
2020	778	+0.4%
Source:"U.S. Census website". United States Census Bureau. and Iowa Data Center; Source: U.S. Decennial Census

=== 2020 census ===
As of the census of 2020, there were 778 people, 304 households, and 217 families residing in the city. The population density was 1,282.3 inhabitants per square mile (495.1/km^{2}). There were 322 housing units at an average density of 530.7 per square mile (204.9/km^{2}). The racial makeup of the city was 94.0% White, 0.3% Black or African American, 0.1% Native American, 0.3% Asian, 0.0% Pacific Islander, 0.9% from other races and 4.5% from two or more races. Hispanic or Latino persons of any race comprised 1.8% of the population.

Of the 304 households, 36.8% of which had children under the age of 18 living with them, 56.6% were married couples living together, 6.2% were cohabitating couples, 17.8% had a female householder with no spouse or partner present and 19.4% had a male householder with no spouse or partner present. 28.6% of all households were non-families. 25.3% of all households were made up of individuals, 11.5% had someone living alone who was 65 years old or older.

The median age in the city was 37.4 years. 28.0% of the residents were under the age of 20; 6.2% were between the ages of 20 and 24; 26.1% were from 25 and 44; 23.4% were from 45 and 64; and 16.3% were 65 years of age or older. The gender makeup of the city was 51.2% male and 48.8% female.

=== 2010 census ===
As of the census of 2010, there were 775 people, 300 households, and 217 families living in the city. The population density was 1,250.0 inhabitants per square mile (482.6/km^{2}). There were 327 housing units at an average density of 527.4 per square mile (203.6/km^{2}). The racial makeup of the city was 97.5% White, 0.3% African American, 0.4% Native American, 0.1% Asian, 0.6% from other races, and 1.0% from two or more races. Hispanic or Latino of any race were 1.3% of the population.

There were 300 households, of which 37.0% had children under the age of 18 living with them, 60.0% were married couples living together, 5.7% had a female householder with no husband present, 6.7% had a male householder with no wife present, and 27.7% were non-families. 23.3% of all households were made up of individuals, and 14.3% had someone living alone who was 65 years of age or older. The average household size was 2.58 and the average family size was 3.02.

The median age in the city was 37 years. 27.7% of residents were under the age of 18; 6.7% were between the ages of 18 and 24; 27.3% were from 25 to 44; 23% were from 45 to 64; and 15.4% were 65 years of age or older. The gender makeup of the city was 48.6% male and 51.4% female.

=== 2000 census ===
As of the census of 2000, there were 891 people, 312 households, and 242 families living in the city. The population density was 1,353.2 inhabitants per square mile (522.5/km^{2}). There were 328 housing units at an average density of 529.0 per square mile (204.2/km^{2}). The racial makeup of the city was 99.52% White, 0.12% Native American, and 0.36% from two or more races. Hispanic or Latino of any race were 0.12% of the population.

There were 312 households, out of which 38.5% had children under the age of 18 living with them, 66.3% were married couples living together, 6.7% had a female householder with no husband present, and 22.4% were non-families. 20.2% of all households were made up of individuals, and 12.8% had someone living alone who was 65 years of age or older. The average household size was 2.69 and the average family size was 3.07.

In the city, the population was spread out, with 28.6% under the age of 18, 7.6% from 18 to 24, 31.5% from 25 to 44, 18.7% from 45 to 64, and 13.6% who were 65 years of age or older. The median age was 34 years. For every 100 females, there were 98.3 males. For every 100 females age 18 and over, there were 93.2 males.

The median income for a household in the city was $41,927, and the median income for a family was $46,125. Males had a median income of $32,153 versus $24,250 for females. The per capita income for the city was $16,263. About 4.9% of families and 6.2% of the population were below the poverty line, including 6.2% of those under age 18 and 8.9% of those age 65 or over.

== Education ==
Southeast Warren Community School District, which serves the municipality, was formed in 1959 as a consolidation of area schools. It operates SE Warren Elementary in Milo, SE Warren Intermediate in Lacona, and SE Warren Junior-Senior High in Liberty Center.
