= Union Township, Lucas County, Iowa =

Township in Lucas County, Iowa, U.S.

Coordinates: 40.9425°N 93.4964°W

Union Township is a township in Lucas County, Iowa, USA.

== History ==
Union Township was established in 1852.
