= Warren Township, Lucas County, Iowa =

Township in Lucas County, Iowa, U.S.

Coordinates: 40.9478°N 93.3872°W

Warren Township is a township in Lucas County, Iowa, USA.

== History ==
Warren Township was established in 1852.
