= Liberty Center, Iowa =

- Unincorporated community
- Liberty Center, Iowa
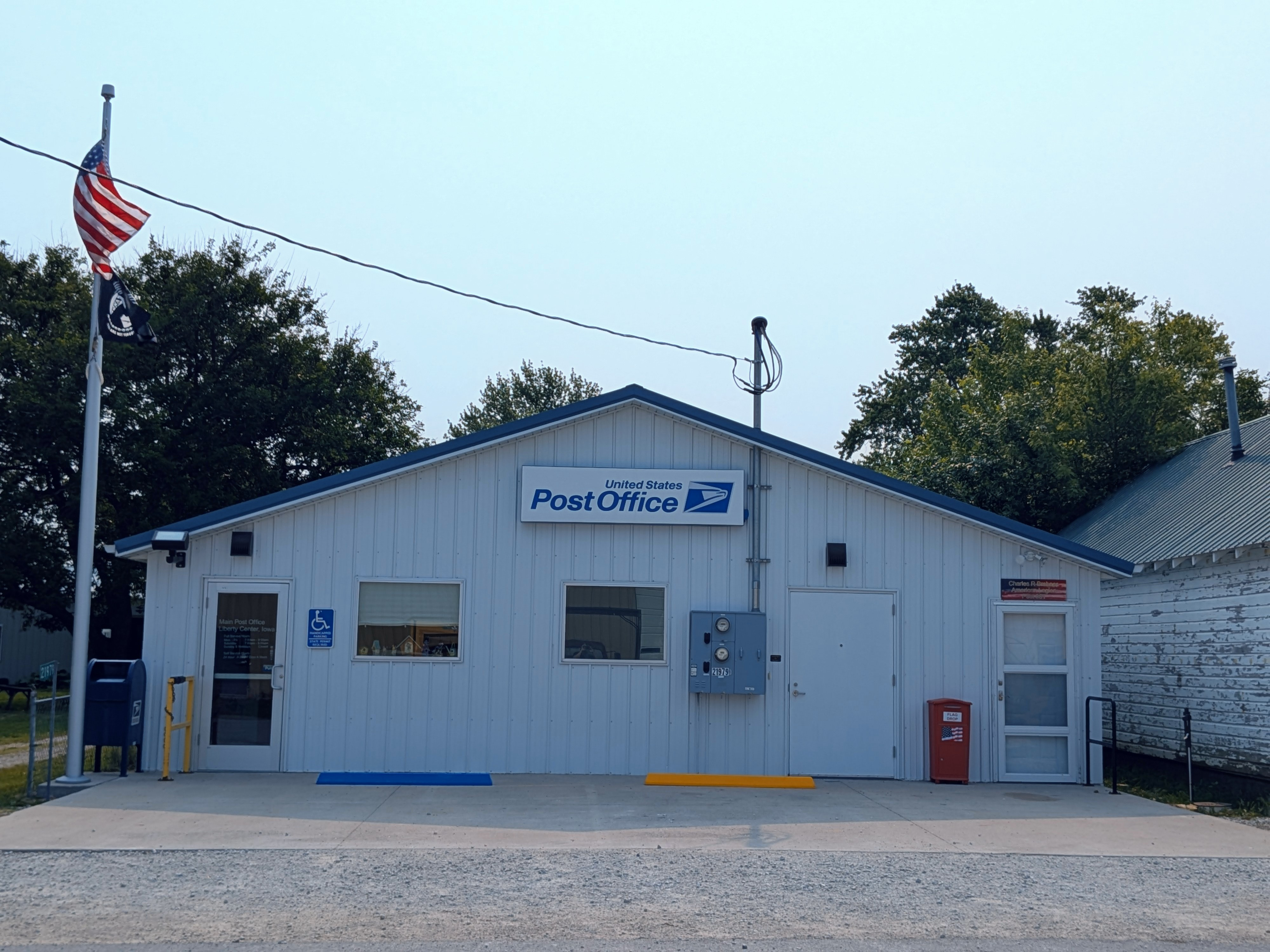
- Liberty Center Post Office

- Location within the state of Iowa Liberty Center, Iowa (the United States)
- Coordinates: 41°12′15″N 93°30′0″W
- Country: United States
- State: Iowa
- County: Warren
- Elevation: 1,024 ft (312 m)
- Time zone: UTC-6 (Central (CST))
  - Summer (DST): UTC-5 (CDT)
- Zip Codes: 50145
- Area code: 641
- GNIS feature ID: 458322

Liberty Center is an unincorporated community in southern Warren County, Iowa, United States. It lies along U.S. Route 65 south of the city of Indianola, the county seat of Warren County. Its elevation is 1,024 feet (312 m), and it is located at about 41°12′16″N 93°30′0″W (41.2043016, -93.4999210). Although Liberty Center is unincorporated, it has a post office, with the ZIP code of 50145, which opened on 7 March 1865.

== History ==
Liberty Center was laid out in 1875. Its population in 1915 was 74. The population was 130 in 1940.

== Education ==
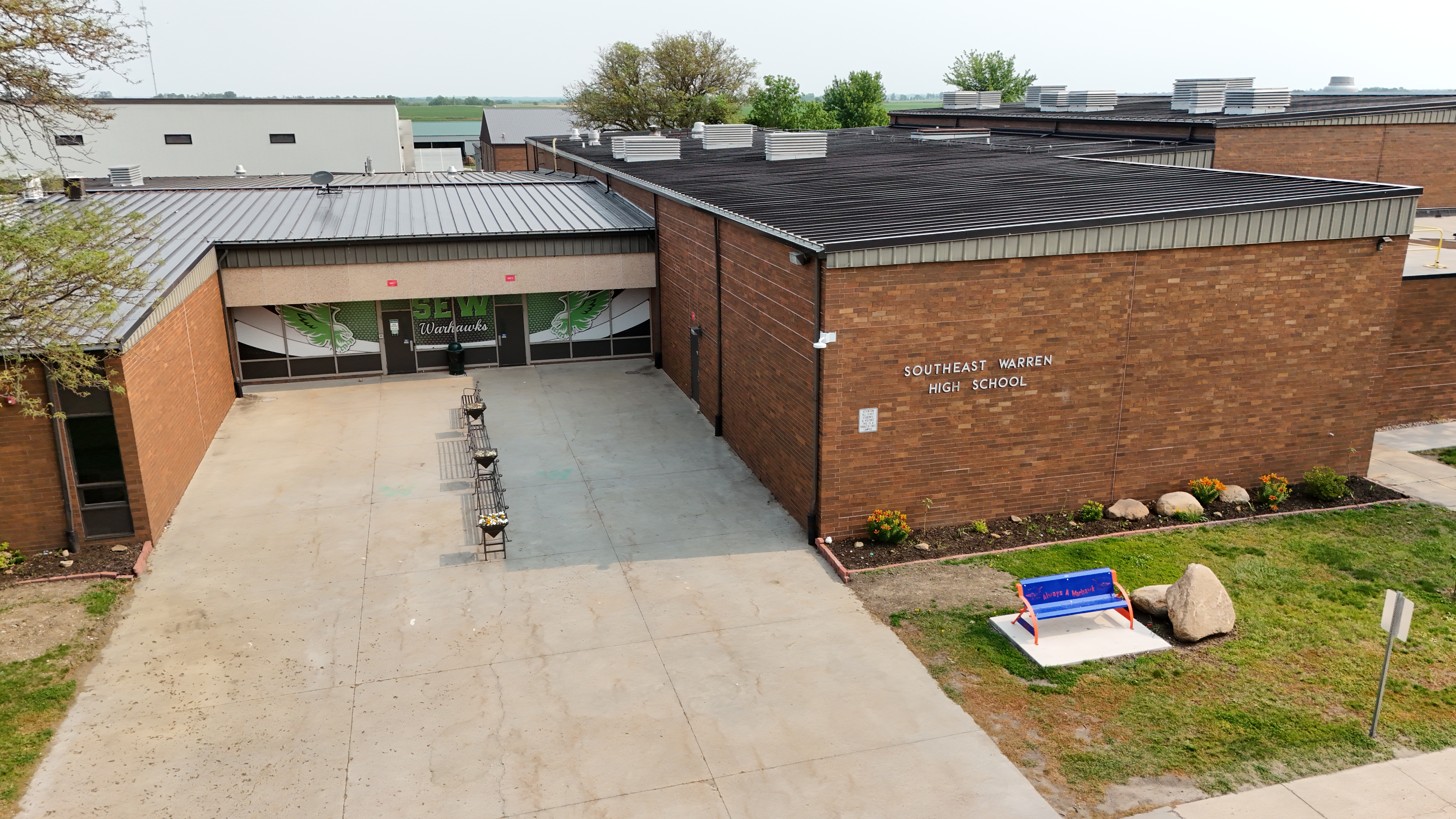
Southeast Warren High School in Liberty Center

Southeast Warren Community School District, headquartered in Liberty Center, was formed in 1959 as a consolidation of area schools. It operates SE Warren Elementary in Milo, SE Warren Intermediate in Lacona, and SE Warren Junior-Senior High in Liberty Center.
