= Lacona, Iowa =

- City
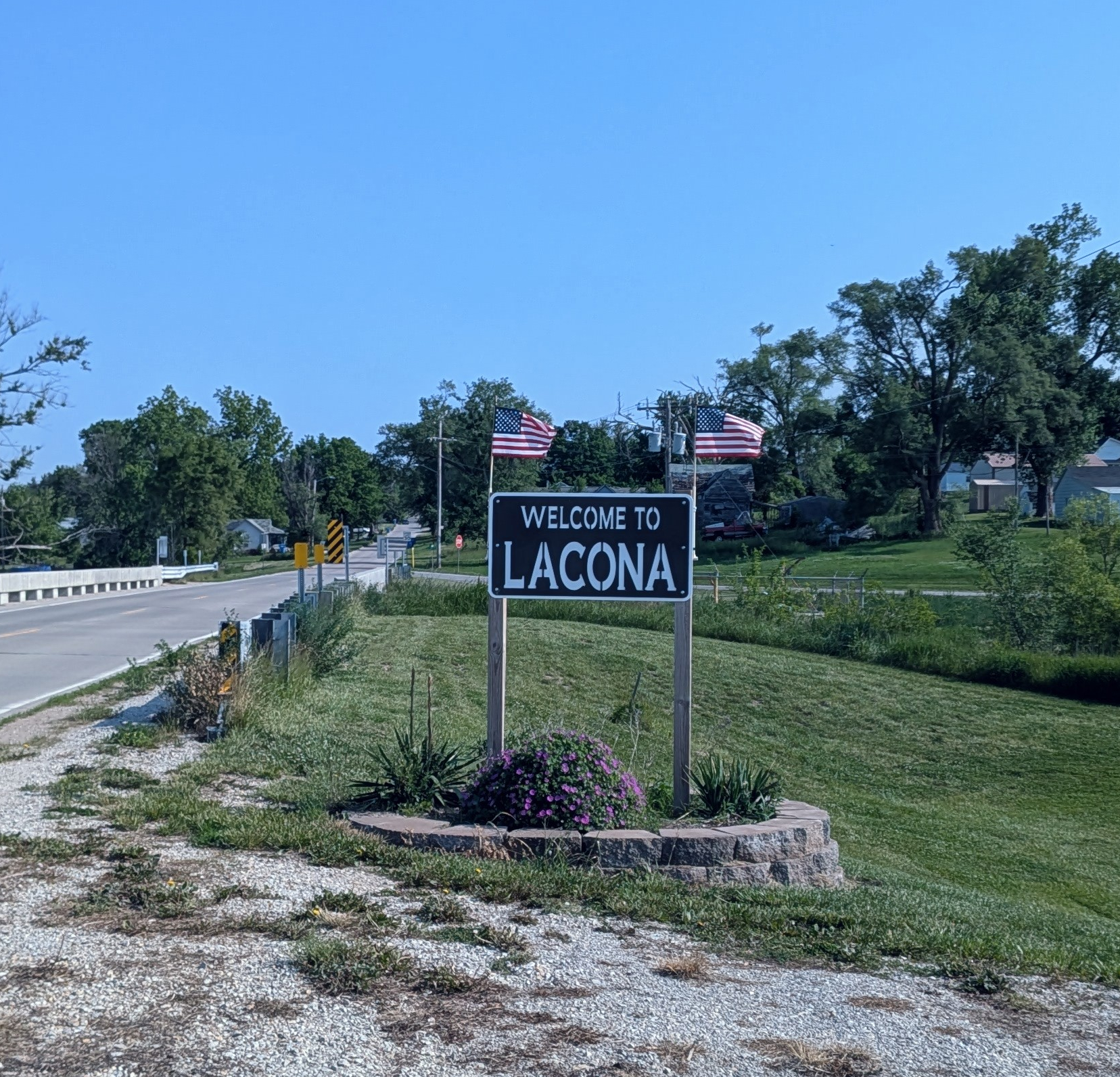
- Lacona welcome sign

- Location of Lacona, Iowa
- Coordinates: 41°11′24″N 93°23′06″W
- Country: USA
- State: Iowa
- County: Warren

Area
  - Total: 0.33 sq mi (0.86 km^{2})
  - Land: 0.33 sq mi (0.86 km^{2})
  - Water: 0 sq mi (0.00 km^{2})
- Elevation: 863 ft (263 m)

Population (2020)
  - Total: 345
  - Density: 1,041.8/sq mi (402.25/km^{2})
- Time zone: UTC-6 (Central (CST))
  - Summer (DST): UTC-5 (CDT)
- ZIP code: 50139
- Area code: 641
- FIPS code: 19-42285
- GNIS feature ID: 2395579

Lacona is a city in Warren County, Iowa, United States. The population was 345 at the time of the 2020 census. It is part of the Des Moines metropolitan area.

== History ==
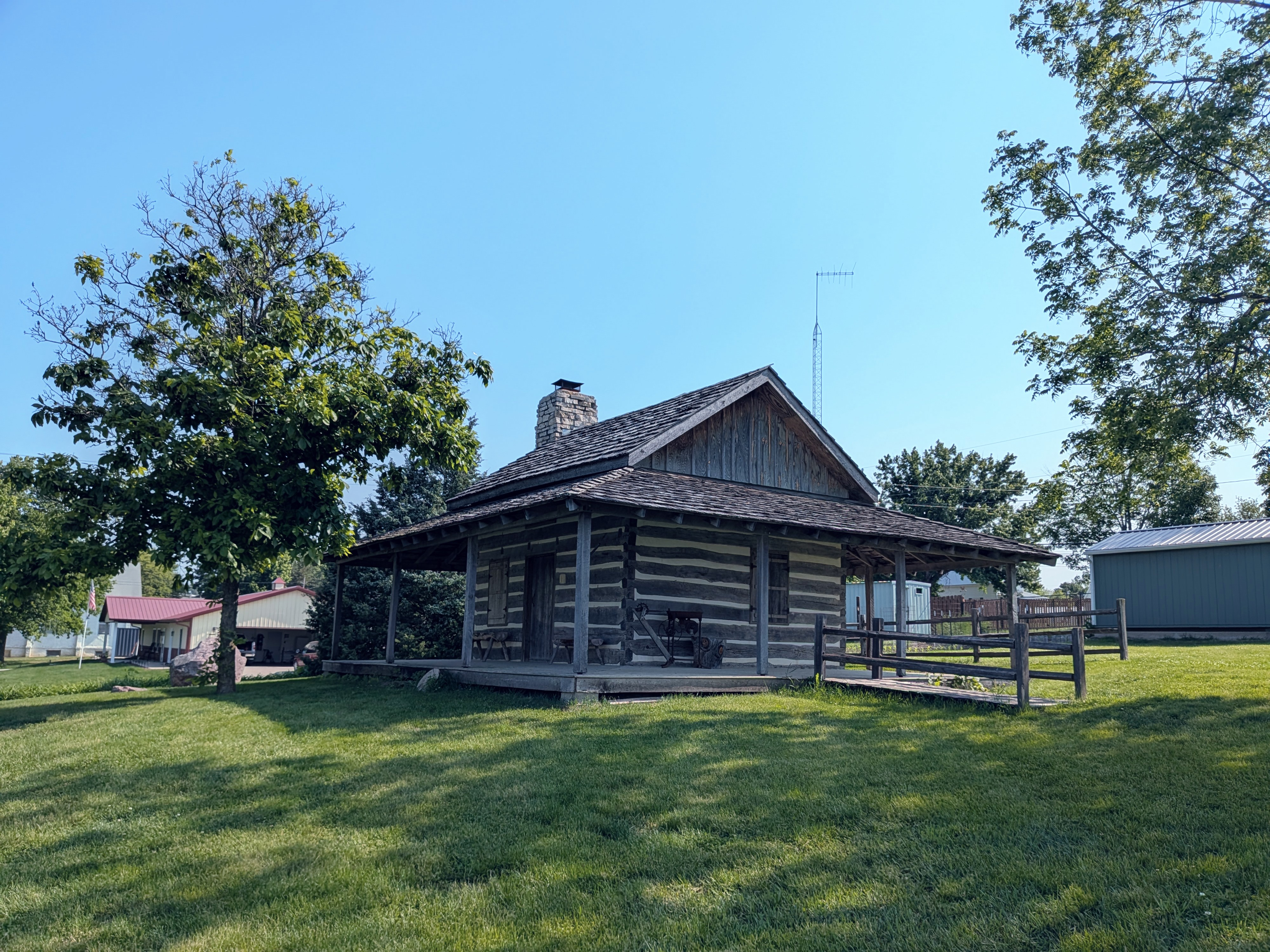
Willis Cabin, a local landmark

Lacona was laid out in 1856. It was incorporated in 1881.

== Geography ==
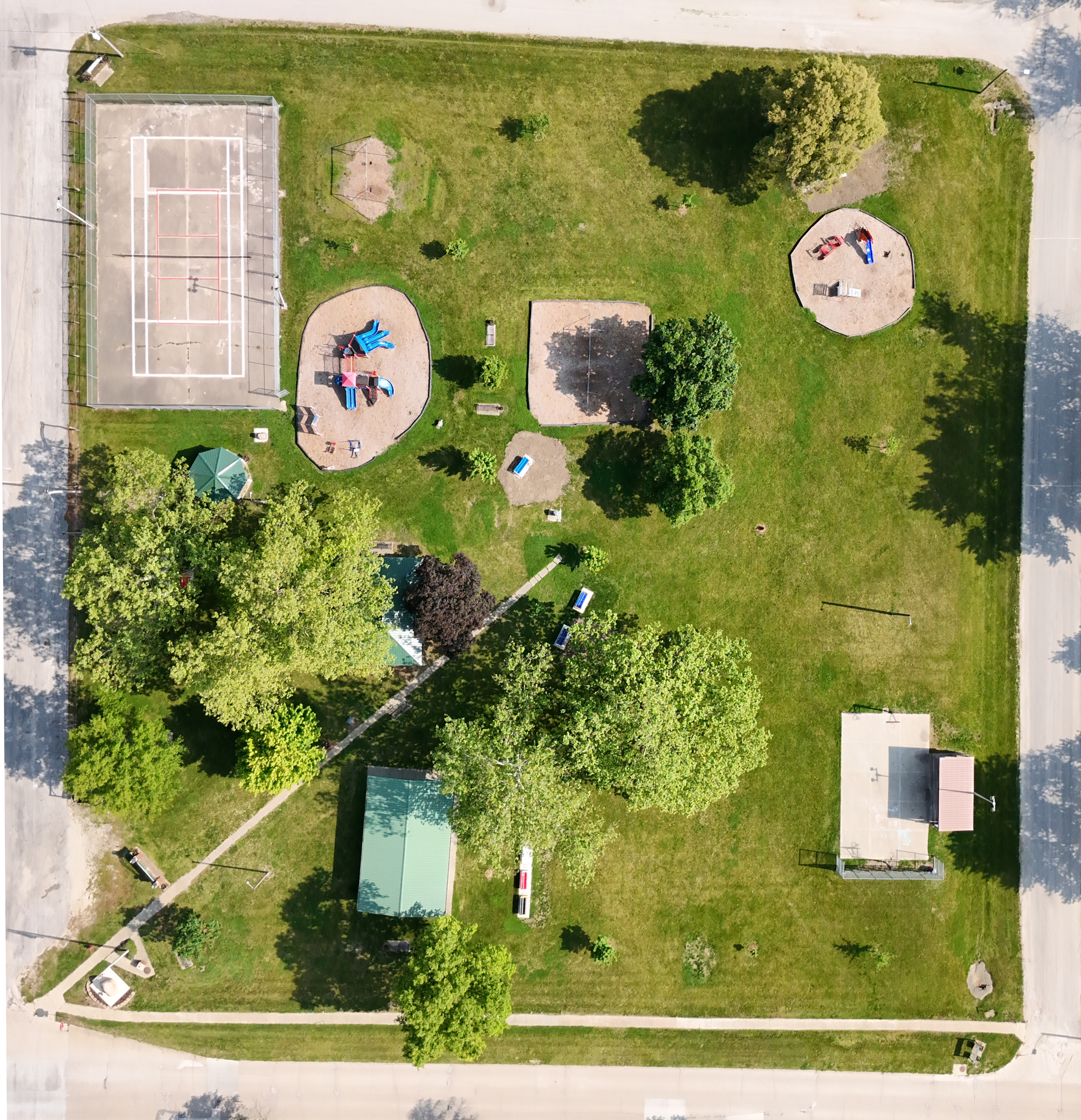
Lacona city park

According to the United States Census Bureau, the city has a total area of 0.36 square miles (0.93 km^{2}), all of it land.

== Demographics ==
Historical populations
Year	Pop.	±%
1880	282	—
1890	301	+6.7%
1900	496	+64.8%
1910	517	+4.2%
1920	502	−2.9%
1930	443	−11.8%
1940	424	−4.3%
1950	430	+1.4%
1960	396	−7.9%
1970	424	+7.1%
1980	376	−11.3%
1990	357	−5.1%
2000	360	+0.8%
2010	361	+0.3%
2020	345	−4.4%
Source:"U.S. Census website". United States Census Bureau. and Iowa Data Center; Source: U.S. Decennial Census

=== 2020 census ===
As of the census of 2020, there were 345 people, 132 households, and 88 families residing in the city. The population density was 1,046.2 inhabitants per square mile (403.9/km^{2}). There were 151 housing units at an average density of 457.9 per square mile (176.8/km^{2}). The racial makeup of the city was 97.7% White, 0.3% Black or African American, 0.0% Native American, 0.0% Asian, 0.0% Pacific Islander, 0.3% from other races and 1.7% from two or more races. Hispanic or Latino persons of any race comprised 0.6% of the population.

Of the 132 households, 34.8% of which had children under the age of 18 living with them, 50.8% were married couples living together, 3.8% were cohabitating couples, 25.8% had a female householder with no spouse or partner present and 19.7% had a male householder with no spouse or partner present. 33.3% of all households were non-families. 28.8% of all households were made up of individuals, 9.1% had someone living alone who was 65 years old or older.

The median age in the city was 39.0 years. 29.3% of the residents were under the age of 20; 3.5% were between the ages of 20 and 24; 24.9% were from 25 and 44; 25.5% were from 45 and 64; and 16.8% were 65 years of age or older. The gender makeup of the city was 47.8% male and 52.2% female.

=== 2010 census ===
As of the census of 2010, there were 361 people, 152 households, and 102 families residing in the city. The population density was 1,002.8 inhabitants per square mile (387.2/km^{2}). There were 165 housing units at an average density of 458.3 per square mile (177.0/km^{2}). The racial makeup of the city was 99.7% White and 0.3% from two or more races. Hispanic or Latino of any race were 0.6% of the population.

There were 152 households, of which 32.9% had children under the age of 18 living with them, 55.3% were married couples living together, 10.5% had a female householder with no husband present, 1.3% had a male householder with no wife present, and 32.9% were non-families. 28.9% of all households were made up of individuals, and 11.1% had someone living alone who was 65 years of age or older. The average household size was 2.38 and the average family size was 2.96.

The median age in the city was 37.6 years. 27.1% of residents were under the age of 18; 5% were between the ages of 18 and 24; 26% were from 25 to 44; 25.2% were from 45 to 64; and 16.6% were 65 years of age or older. The gender makeup of the city was 49.0% male and 51.0% female.

=== 2000 census ===
As of the census of 2000, there were 360 people, 151 households, and 97 families residing in the city. The population density was 993.2 inhabitants per square mile (383.5/km^{2}). There were 159 housing units at an average density of 438.7 per square mile (169.4/km^{2}). The racial makeup of the city was 98.61% White, 0.28% Asian, and 1.11% from two or more races.

There were 151 households, out of which 31.1% had children under the age of 18 living with them, 55.6% were married couples living together, 5.3% had a female householder with no husband present, and 35.1% were non-families. 31.8% of all households were made up of individuals, and 19.9% had someone living alone who was 65 years of age or older. The average household size was 2.38 and the average family size was 3.08.

In the city, the population was spread out, with 24.2% under the age of 18, 9.4% from 18 to 24, 30.0% from 25 to 44, 20.6% from 45 to 64, and 15.8% who were 65 years of age or older. The median age was 38 years. For every 100 females, there were 97.8 males. For every 100 females age 18 and over, there were 93.6 males.

The median income for a household in the city was $39,375, and the median income for a family was $47,083. Males had a median income of $35,625 versus $25,750 for females. The per capita income for the city was $17,897. About 7.9% of families and 7.0% of the population were below the poverty line, including 5.9% of those under age 18 and 10.5% of those age 65 or over.

== Education ==
Southeast Warren Community School District, which serves the municipality, was formed in 1959 as a consolidation of area schools. It operates SE Warren Elementary in Milo, SE Warren Intermediate in Lacona, and SE Warren Junior-Senior High in Liberty Center.

== Notable people ==
- Dave Baker, pro baseball player
- Cliff Clevenger, United States Representative from Ohio 1939-1959
