= Russell, Iowa =

- City
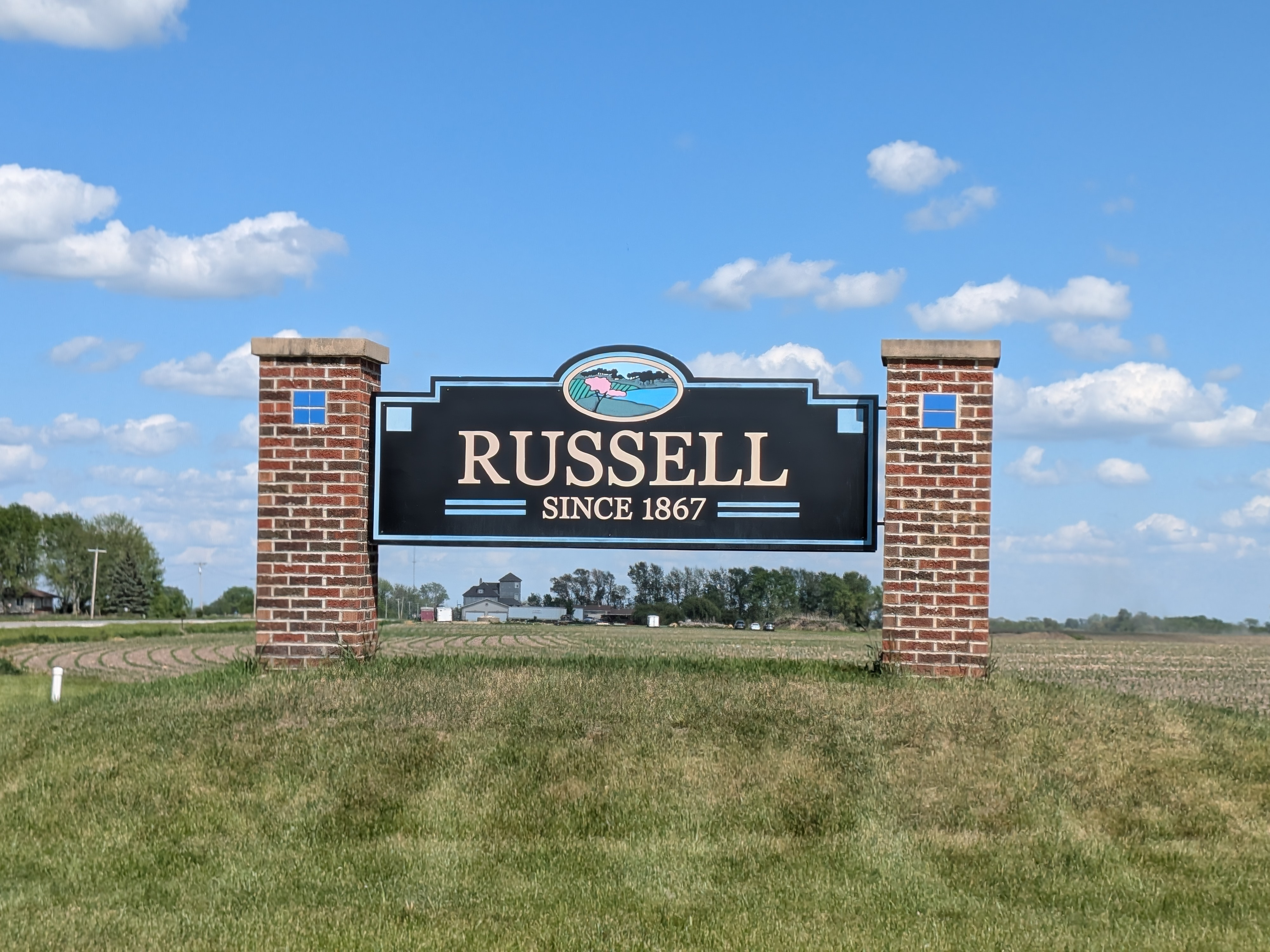

- Location of Russell, Iowa
- Coordinates: 40°58′49″N 93°12′02″W
- Country: United States
- State: Iowa
- County: Lucas
- Incorporated: April 25, 1887

Area
  - Total: 1.03 sq mi (2.66 km^{2})
  - Land: 1.03 sq mi (2.66 km^{2})
  - Water: 0 sq mi (0.00 km^{2})
- Elevation: 1,024 ft (312 m)

Population (2020)
  - Total: 472
  - Density: 460.4/sq mi (177.75/km^{2})
- Time zone: UTC-6 (Central (CST))
  - Summer (DST): UTC-5 (CDT)
- ZIP code: 50238
- Area code: 641
- FIPS code: 19-69285
- GNIS feature ID: 2396456
- Website: cityofrusselliowa.com

Russell is a city in Lucas County, Iowa, United States. The population was 472 in the 2020 census, a decline from the 559 population in 2000.

== History ==
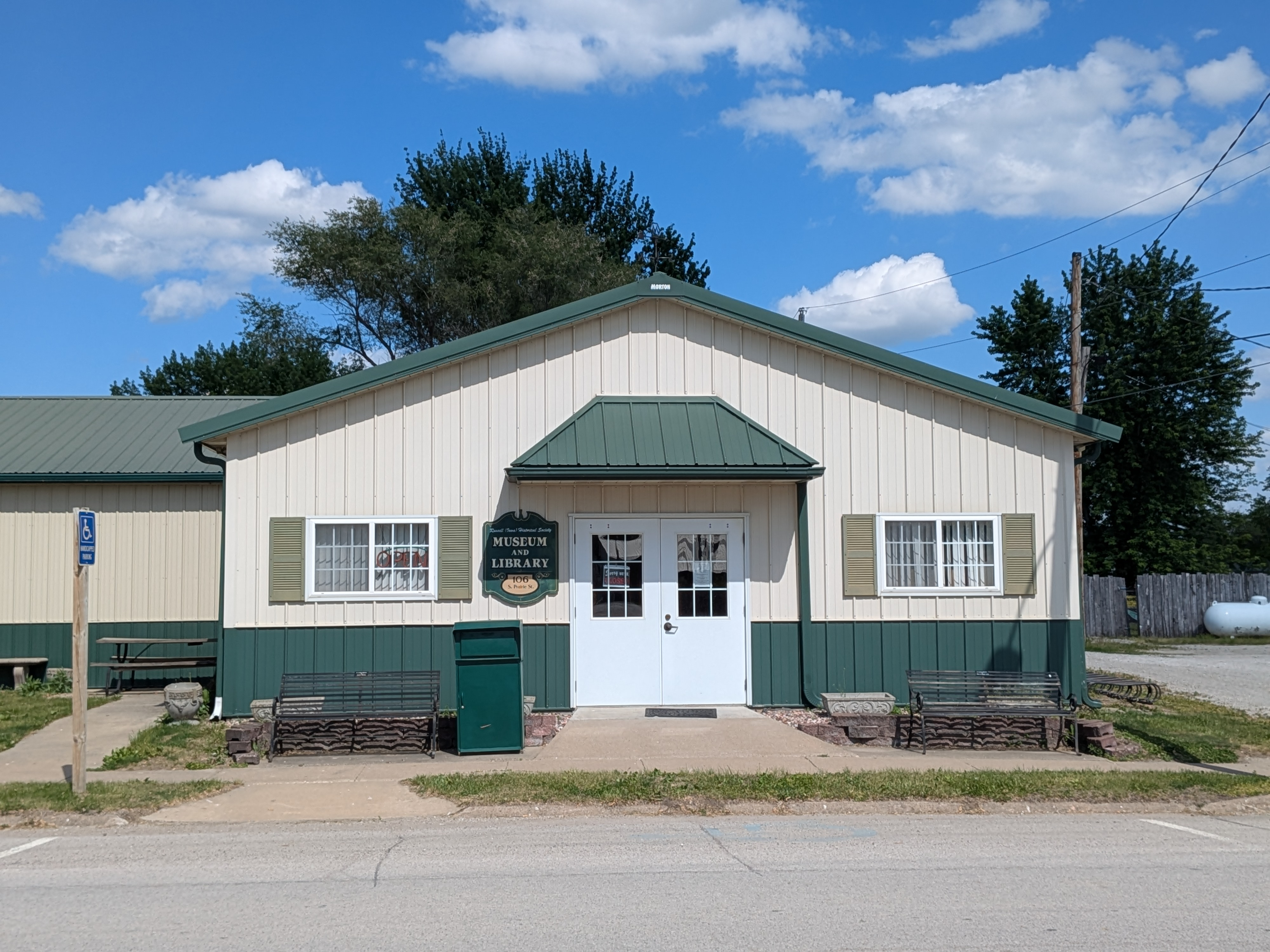
City museum and library

Russell was incorporated as a city on April 25, 1887.

The town was originally settled by German and Irish settlers in the 1850s. By the early 1860s the town of Russell had been made into a farming community and provided a source of food for surrounding communities. After being incorporated, a railway and railroad grain-tower were constructed along the town's edge allowing excess produce to be travelled elsewhere on the frontier.

In 1935, the town suffered a fire on the town square that burned down the eastern side and killed 3 people.

== Geography ==
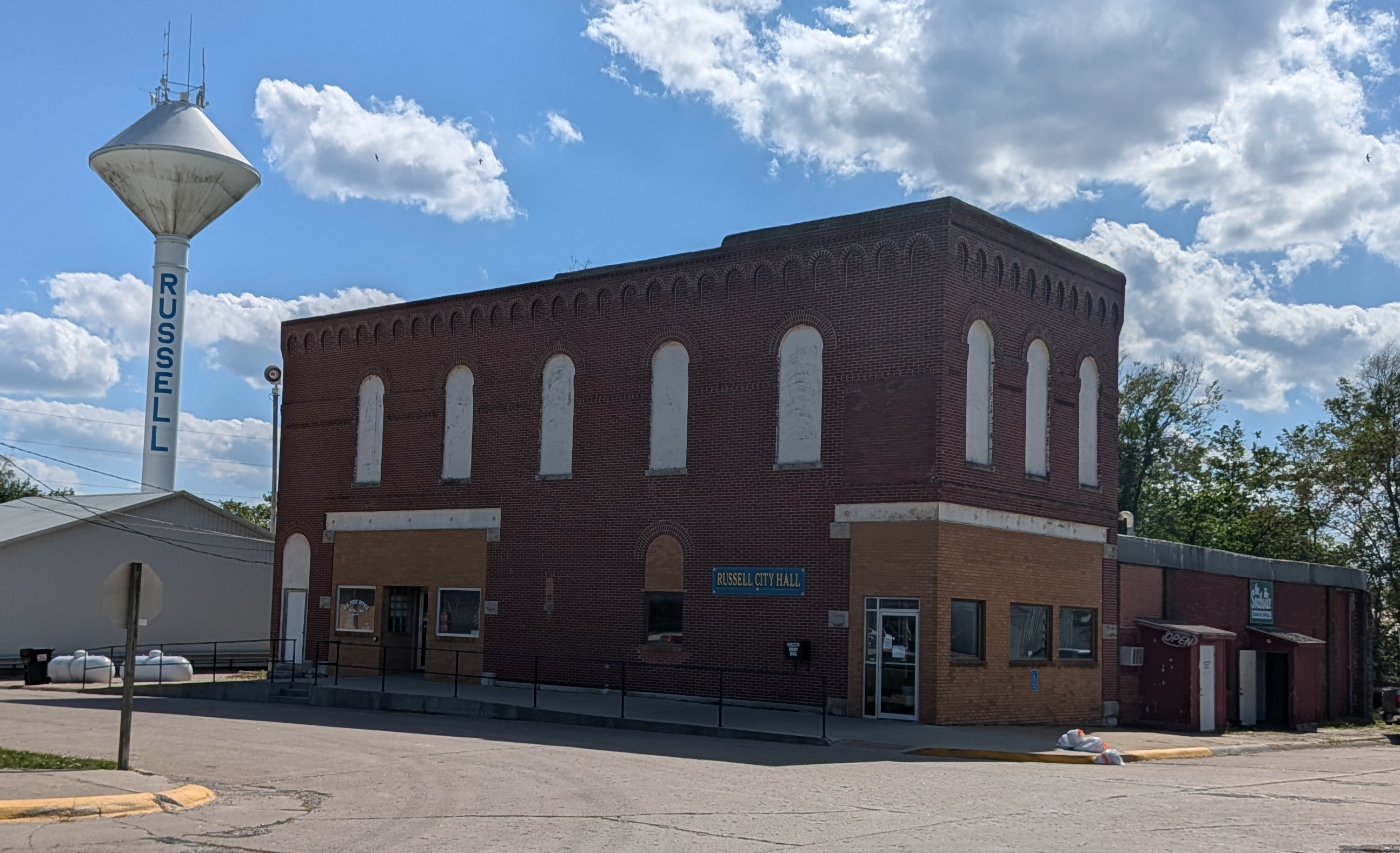
Russell City Hall

According to the United States Census Bureau, the city has a total area of 1.04 square miles (2.69 km^{2}), all land.

== Demographics ==
Historical population
Census	Pop.	Note	%±
1870	175		—
1880	345		97.1%
1890	443		28.4%
1900	636		43.6%
1910	612		−3.8%
1920	633		3.4%
1930	571		−9.8%
1940	642		12.4%
1950	566		−11.8%
1960	577		1.9%
1970	591		2.4%
1980	593		0.3%
1990	531		−10.5%
2000	559		5.3%
2010	554		−0.9%
2020	472		−14.8%
U.S. Decennial Census

=== 2020 census ===
As of the census of 2020, there were 472 people, 202 households, and 124 families residing in the city. The population density was 460.4 inhabitants per square mile (177.8/km^{2}). There were 227 housing units at an average density of 221.4 per square mile (85.5/km^{2}). The racial makeup of the city was 96.0% White, 0.0% Black or African American, 0.0% Native American, 0.0% Asian, 0.0% Pacific Islander, 0.0% from other races and 4.0% from two or more races. Hispanic or Latino persons of any race comprised 0.4% of the population.

Of the 202 households, 26.7% of which had children under the age of 18 living with them, 46.5% were married couples living together, 7.4% were cohabitating couples, 21.3% had a female householder with no spouse or partner present and 24.8% had a male householder with no spouse or partner present. 38.6% of all households were non-families. 31.2% of all households were made up of individuals, 12.4% had someone living alone who was 65 years old or older.

The median age in the city was 45.6 years. 24.8% of the residents were under the age of 20; 3.0% were between the ages of 20 and 24; 21.4% were from 25 and 44; 29.4% were from 45 and 64; and 21.4% were 65 years of age or older. The gender makeup of the city was 48.1% male and 51.9% female.

=== 2010 census ===
As of the census of 2010, there were 554 people, 212 households, and 146 families residing in the city. The population density was 532.7 inhabitants per square mile (205.7/km^{2}). There were 250 housing units at an average density of 240.4 per square mile (92.8/km^{2}). The racial makeup of the city was 96.9% White, 0.4% African American, 2.2% Native American, and 0.5% from other races. Hispanic or Latino of any race were 2.0% of the population.

There were 212 households, of which 34.9% had children under the age of 18 living with them, 53.3% were married couples living together, 11.3% had a female householder with no husband present, 4.2% had a male householder with no wife present, and 31.1% were non-families. 27.4% of all households were made up of individuals, and 17.4% had someone living alone who was 65 years of age or older. The average household size was 2.61 and the average family size was 3.10.

The median age in the city was 39.4 years. 29.6% of residents were under the age of 18; 6.4% were between the ages of 18 and 24; 22.7% were from 25 to 44; 23.7% were from 45 to 64; and 17.7% were 65 years of age or older. The gender makeup of the city was 49.8% male and 50.2% female.

=== 2000 census ===
As of the census of 2000, there were 559 people, 239 households, and 144 families residing in the city. The population density was 539.7 inhabitants per square mile (208.4/km^{2}). There were 265 housing units at an average density of 255.8 per square mile (98.8/km^{2}). The racial makeup of the city was 98.57% White, 0.18% Native American, 0.36% Asian, and 0.89% from two or more races. Hispanic or Latino of any race were 0.36% of the population.

There were 239 households, out of which 29.3% had children under the age of 18 living with them, 50.2% were married couples living together, 6.7% had a female householder with no husband present, and 39.7% were non-families. 33.1% of all households were made up of individuals, and 19.7% had someone living alone who was 65 years of age or older. The average household size was 2.34 and the average family size was 2.97.

In the city, the population was spread out, with 27.0% under the age of 18, 6.8% from 18 to 24, 24.0% from 25 to 44, 19.3% from 45 to 64, and 22.9% who were 65 years of age or older. The median age was 40 years. For every 100 females, there were 89.5 males. For every 100 females age 18 and over, there were 92.5 males.

The median income for a household in the city was $28,125, and the median income for a family was $29,688. Males had a median income of $26,094 versus $16,406 for females. The per capita income for the city was $13,093. About 16.5% of families and 23.6% of the population were below the poverty line, including 42.6% of those under age 18 and 9.0% of those age 65 or over.

== Schools ==
The city is within the Chariton Community School District, which operates Chariton High School.

The Russell Community School District at one time maintained its own K-12 school, with a five-member board of education overseeing operation of the district. Athletic teams were known as the Trojans.

The Russell School District was forced to close in 2008, making it the second time this happened in the state of Iowa; the other was Hedrick in 1990. The Iowa Board of Education cited the district's financial problems, which left Russell school officials unable to provide students with a first-rate education.

== Notable people ==
- Rich Arnold (born 1945), Iowa House Representative 1995–current (2011)
- George McGill (1879–1963), United States Senator from Kansas 1930–39
- Paul McKinley Iowa Senator 2001–2013
