= Otter Creek Township, Lucas County, Iowa =

Township in Lucas County, Iowa, U.S.

Coordinates: 41.1236°N 93.4925°W

Otter Creek Township is a township in Lucas County, Iowa, USA.

== History ==
Otter Creek Township was established in 1853.
