= Jackson Township, Lucas County, Iowa =

Township in Lucas County, Iowa, U.S.

Coordinates: 41.0353°N 93.5039°W

Jackson Township is a township in Lucas County, Iowa, United States.

== History ==
Jackson Township was established in 1855.
