= Melrose, Iowa =

- City
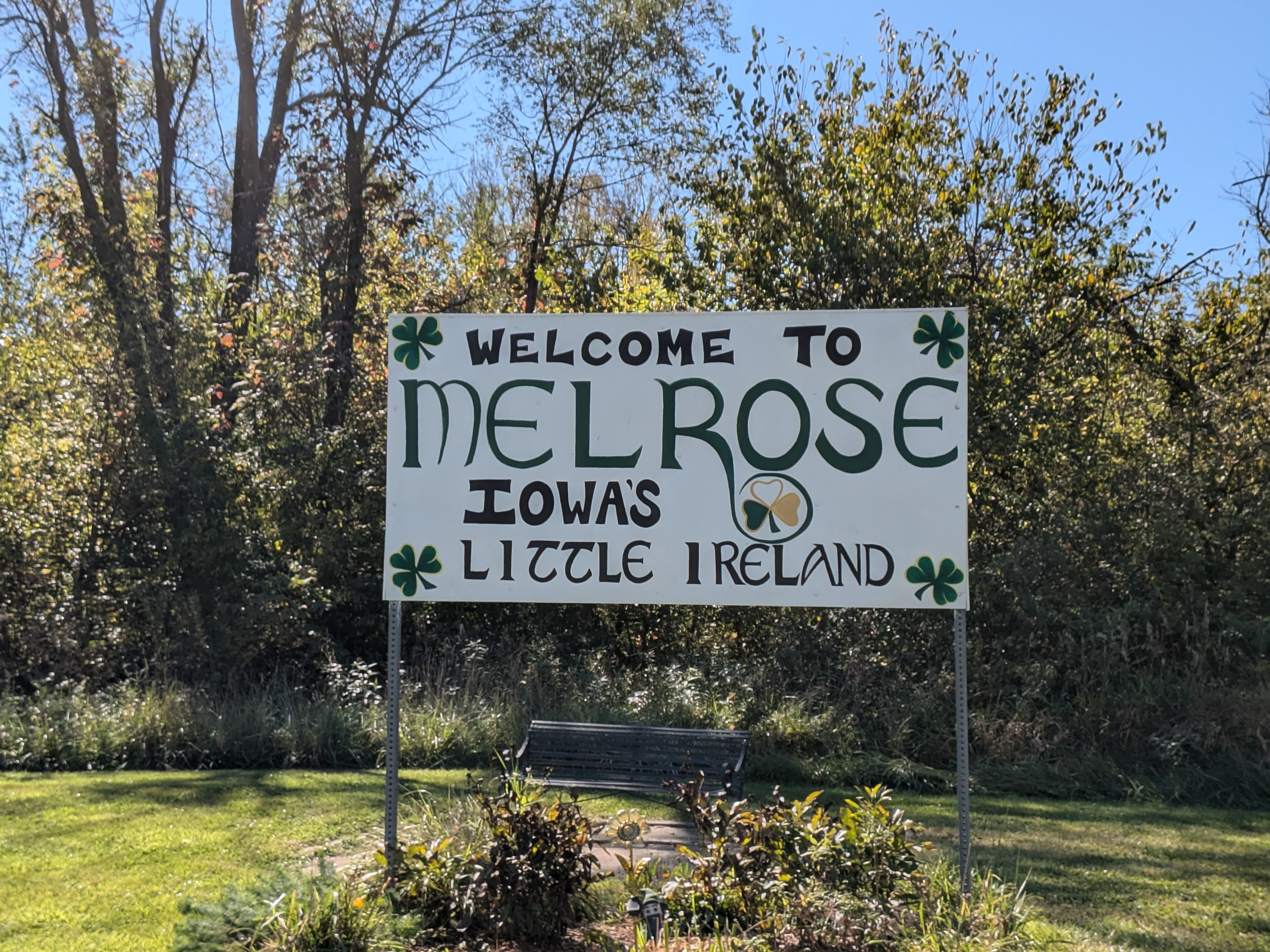
- Welcome Sign in Melrose

- Location of Melrose, Iowa
- Coordinates: 40°58′45″N 93°03′03″W
- Country: USA
- State: Iowa
- County: Monroe

Area
  - Total: 1.02 sq mi (2.63 km^{2})
  - Land: 1.02 sq mi (2.63 km^{2})
  - Water: 0 sq mi (0.00 km^{2})
- Elevation: 971 ft (296 m)

Population (2020)
  - Total: 110
  - Density: 108.5/sq mi (41.89/km^{2})
- Time zone: UTC-6 (Central (CST))
  - Summer (DST): UTC-5 (CDT)
- ZIP code: 52569
- Area code: 641
- FIPS code: 19-50970
- GNIS feature ID: 2395089
- Website: www.melroseiowa.com

Melrose is a small city in Monroe County, Iowa, United States. The population was 110 at the time of the 2020 census. Melrose is known as Iowa's "Little Ireland". As such, the majority of the 110 population are Irish Catholics. Melrose is part of Iowa's 3rd congressional district.

== History ==
Melrose was platted in 1866 when the railroad was built through that territory.

== Events ==
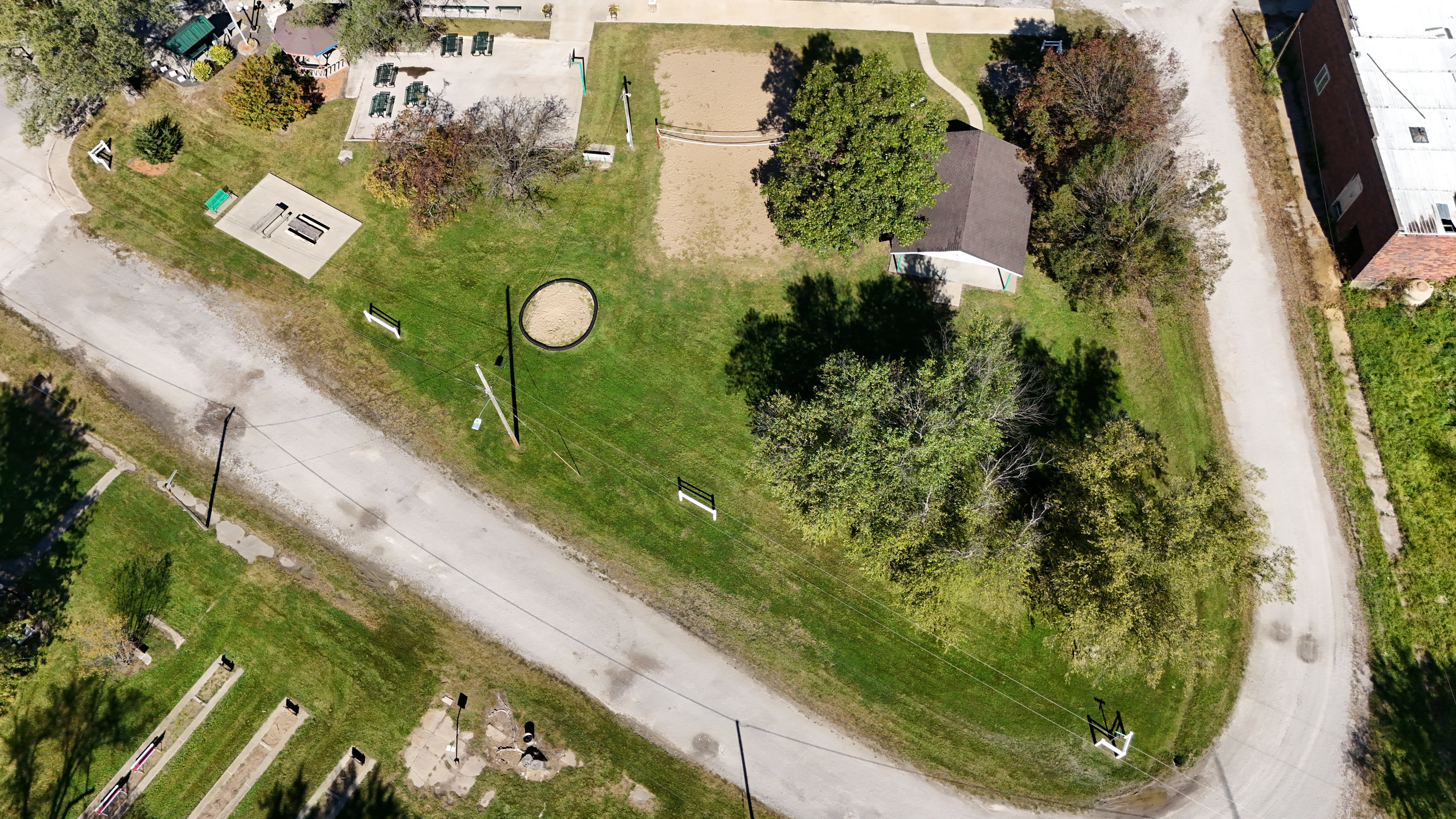
Tolendol Park in Melrose

Every year the city hosts an Independence Day celebration as a fundraiser for the Melrose Volunteer Fire Department. The event includes a parade, food, a frog race, tug of war, and concludes with a firework show. The celebration takes place the Saturday after July 4.

== Geography ==
According to the United States Census Bureau, the city has a total area of 1.01 square miles (2.62 km^{2}), all land.

== Demographics ==
Historical populations
Year	Pop.	±%
1880	378	—
1890	395	+4.5%
1900	400	+1.3%
1910	459	+14.7%
1920	450	−2.0%
1930	417	−7.3%
1940	451	+8.2%
1950	310	−31.3%
1960	214	−31.0%
1970	192	−10.3%
1980	218	+13.5%
1990	150	−31.2%
2000	130	−13.3%
2010	112	−13.8%
2020	110	−1.8%
Source:"U.S. Census website". United States Census Bureau. and Iowa Data Center; Source: U.S. Decennial Census

=== 2020 census ===
As of the census of 2020, there were 110 people, 50 households, and 36 families residing in the city. The population density was 108.5 inhabitants per square mile (41.9/km^{2}). There were 57 housing units at an average density of 56.2 per square mile (21.7/km^{2}). The racial makeup of the city was 94.5% White, 0.0% Black or African American, 1.8% Native American, 0.0% Asian, 0.0% Pacific Islander, 0.9% from other races and 2.7% from two or more races. Hispanic or Latino persons of any race comprised 1.8% of the population.

Of the 50 households, 40.0% of which had children under the age of 18 living with them, 48.0% were married couples living together, 10.0% were cohabitating couples, 12.0% had a female householder with no spouse or partner present and 30.0% had a male householder with no spouse or partner present. 28.0% of all households were non-families. 24.0% of all households were made up of individuals, 10.0% had someone living alone who was 65 years old or older.

The median age in the city was 37.0 years. 33.6% of the residents were under the age of 20; 3.6% were between the ages of 20 and 24; 20.0% were from 25 and 44; 14.5% were from 45 and 64; and 28.2% were 65 years of age or older. The gender makeup of the city was 49.1% male and 50.9% female.

=== 2010 census ===
As of the census of 2010, there were 112 people, 51 households, and 34 families residing in the city. The population density was 110.9 inhabitants per square mile (42.8/km^{2}). There were 67 housing units at an average density of 66.3 per square mile (25.6/km^{2}). The racial makeup of the city was 96.4% White, 0.9% Asian, and 2.7% from two or more races.

There were 51 households, of which 13.7% had children under the age of 18 living with them, 62.7% were married couples living together, 3.9% had a male householder with no wife present, and 33.3% were non-families. 29.4% of all households were made up of individuals, and 11.8% had someone living alone who was 65 years of age or older. The average household size was 2.20 and the average family size was 2.71.

The median age in the city was 54 years. 16.1% of residents were under the age of 18; 3.6% were between the ages of 18 and 24; 24.2% were from 25 to 44; 30.3% were from 45 to 64; and 25.9% were 65 years of age or older. The gender makeup of the city was 53.6% male and 46.4% female.

=== 2000 census ===
As of the census of 2000, there were 130 people, 56 households, and 38 families residing in the city. The population density was 153.7 inhabitants per square mile (59.3/km^{2}). There were 67 housing units at an average density of 79.2 per square mile (30.6/km^{2}). The racial makeup of the city was 97.69% White, 0.77% Asian, 0.77% from other races, and 0.77% from two or more races.

There were 56 households, out of which 21.4% had children under the age of 18 living with them, 51.8% were married couples living together, 12.5% had a female householder with no husband present, and 32.1% were non-families. 28.6% of all households were made up of individuals, and 10.7% had someone living alone who was 65 years of age or older. The average household size was 2.32 and the average family size was 2.87.

In the city, the population was spread out, with 18.5% under the age of 18, 12.3% from 18 to 24, 15.4% from 25 to 44, 34.6% from 45 to 64, and 19.2% who were 65 years of age or older. The median age was 47 years. For every 100 females, there were 88.4 males. For every 100 females age 18 and over, there were 92.7 males.

The median income for a household in the city was $34,583, and the median income for a family was $32,917. Males had a median income of $30,417 versus $25,417 for females. The per capita income for the city was $15,507. There were 25.6% of families and 21.1% of the population living below the poverty line, including 44.0% of under eighteens and none of those over 64.

== Education ==
Albia Community School District operates public schools serving the community.

== Sports ==
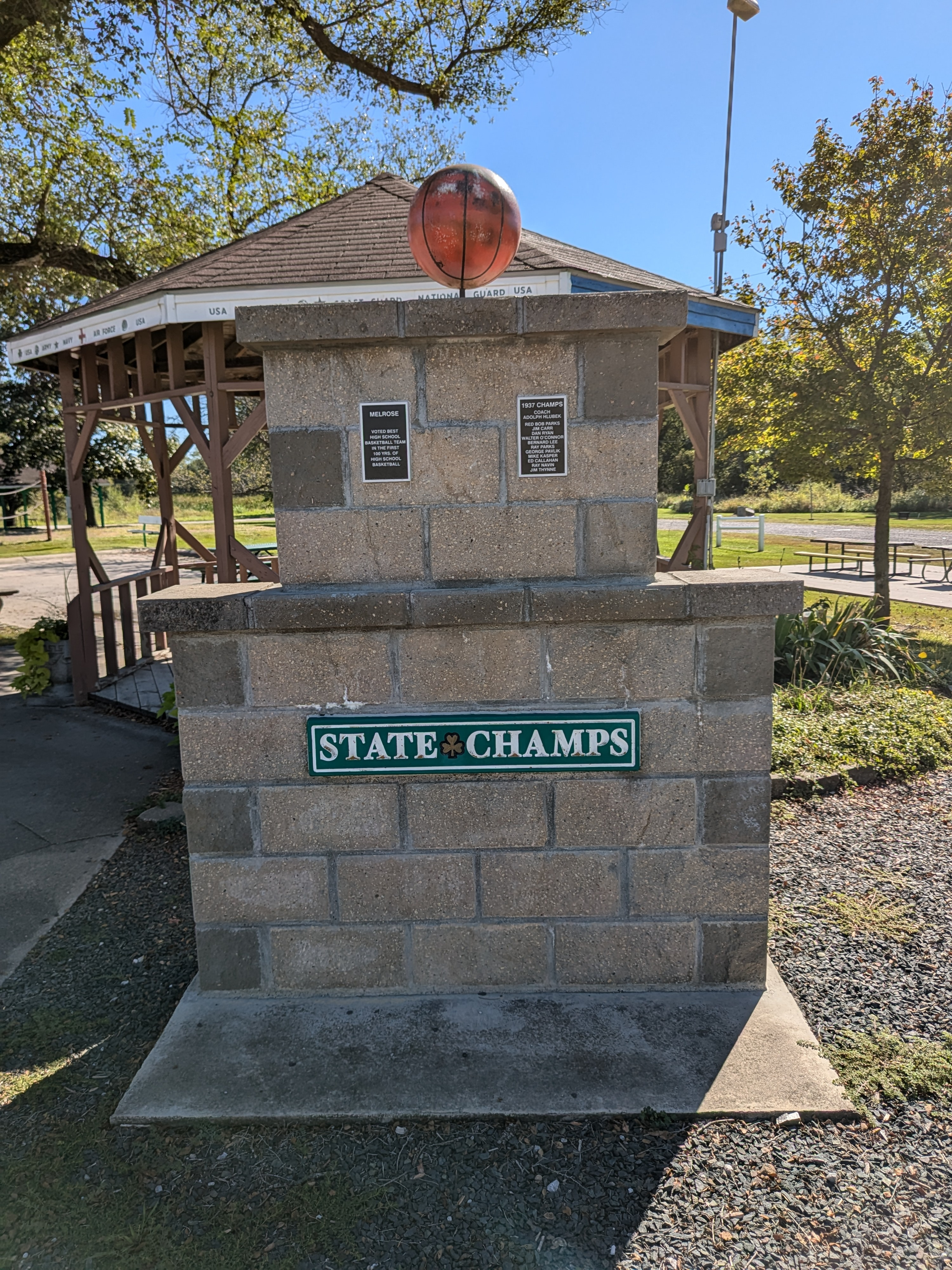
A monument in Melrose, commemorating the 1937 basketball team.

The 1937 Melrose Shamrocks were the Iowa state high school basketball champions. With an enrollment of only 66, the Shamrocks were the smallest school ever to win a single-class state basketball title in Iowa. The team finished their season 33–0, the first undefeated boys basketball team in Iowa history. In 2012, the Des Moines Register recognized the Shamrocks as one of the ten best State tournament teams in Iowa history. The Shamrocks made the State boys' basketball tournament again in 1938, 1950, and 1959.

Walt O'Connor and Jim Thynne from the 1937 team and Donald Knowles, a 1942 Melrose graduate, were inducted into the Iowa High School Athletic Association Hall of Fame. In March 2012, the Iowa High School Athletic Association inducted Coach Ad Hlubek into the Hall of Fame as a coach. In May 2012, the Iowa House of Representatives officially congratulated the 1937 Melrose Shamrocks basketball team on the 75th anniversary of their championship. The resolution recounted the accomplishments of the 1937 team and encouraged "all Iowans to follow its example in striving to accomplish goals that seem impossible." In late 2012, the city of Melrose, erected a monument in the center of town honoring the 1937 basketball team and its selection in a Des Moines Register poll as the top team in the first 100 years of boys’ basketball in Iowa.

== Notable people ==
- Thomas E. Martin Former U.S. Congressman
