= Lucas County, Iowa =

County in Iowa, United States

- County
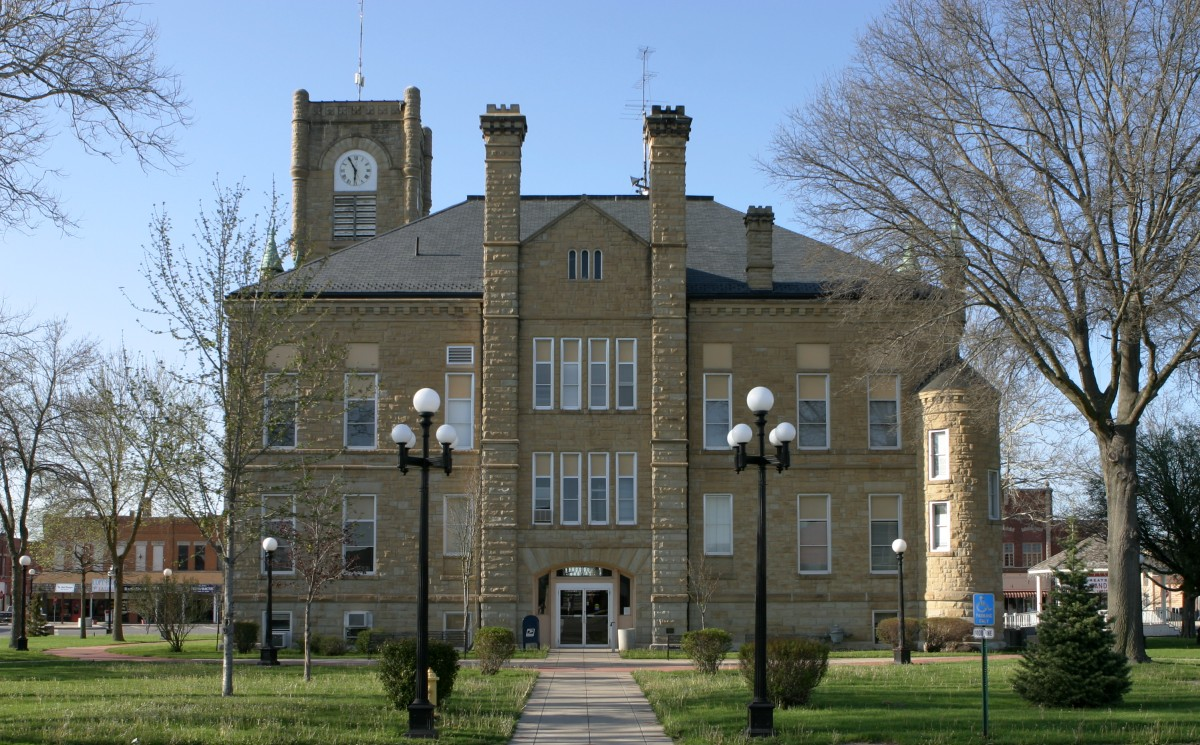
- The Lucas County Courthouse in Chariton

- Location within the U.S. state of Iowa
- Coordinates: 41°01′34″N 93°19′42″W
- Country: United States
- State: Iowa
- Founded: 1846
- Named for: Robert Lucas
- Seat: Chariton
- Largest city: Chariton

Area
  - Total: 434 sq mi (1,120 km^{2})
  - Land: 431 sq mi (1,120 km^{2})
  - Water: 3.8 sq mi (9.8 km^{2}) 0.9%

Population (2020)
  - Total: 8,634
  - Estimate (2025): 8,847 ▲
  - Density: 20.5/sq mi (7.9/km^{2})
- Time zone: UTC−6 (Central)
  - Summer (DST): UTC−5 (CDT)
- Congressional district: 3rd
- Website: lucascounty.iowa.gov
- Iowa county number 59

Lucas County is a county located in the U.S. state of Iowa. As of the 2020 census, the population was 8,634. The county seat is Chariton. The county was formed in 1846 and was named after Robert Lucas, a Governor of the Territory.

== Geography ==
According to the United States Census Bureau, the county has a total area of 434 square miles (1,120 km^{2}), of which 431 square miles (1,120 km^{2}) is land and 3.8 square miles (9.8 km^{2}) (0.9%) is water.

=== Major highways ===
- U.S. Highway 34
- U.S. Highway 65
- Iowa Highway 14

=== Adjacent counties ===
- Warren County (northwest)
- Marion County (northeast)
- Monroe County (east)
- Wayne County (south)
- Clarke County (west)

== Demographics ==
Historical population
Census	Pop.	Note	%±
1850	471		—
1860	5,766		1,124.2%
1870	10,388		80.2%
1880	14,530		39.9%
1890	14,563		0.2%
1900	16,126		10.7%
1910	13,462		−16.5%
1920	15,686		16.5%
1930	15,114		−3.6%
1940	14,571		−3.6%
1950	12,069		−17.2%
1960	10,923		−9.5%
1970	10,163		−7.0%
1980	10,313		1.5%
1990	9,070		−12.1%
2000	9,422		3.9%
2010	8,898		−5.6%
2020	8,634		−3.0%
2025 (est.)	8,847	▲	2.5%
U.S. Decennial Census; 1790–1960 1900–1990; 1990–2000 2010–20 2025

=== 2020 census ===
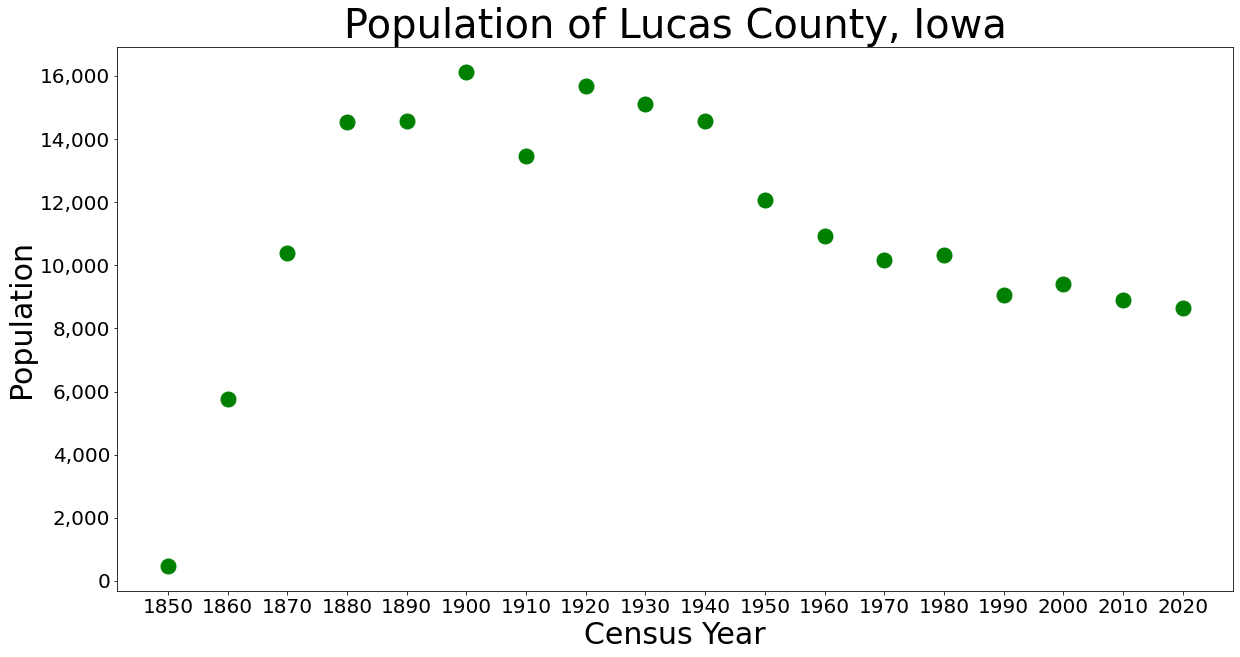
Population of Lucas County from the U.S. census data

As of the 2020 census, the county had a population of 8,634 and a population density of 20.0/sq mi (7.7/km^{2}). The census counted 96.75% of residents as belonging to a single race—92.76% were non-Hispanic White, 0.27% were Black, 0.08% were Native American, 0.34% were Asian, 0.00% were Native Hawaiian or Pacific Islander, and 4.26% identified with some other race or more than one race.

The racial makeup of the county was 95.1% White, 0.3% Black or African American, 0.1% American Indian and Alaska Native, 0.3% Asian, <0.1% Native Hawaiian or Pacific Islander, 1.0% from some other race, and 3.3% from two or more races; Hispanic or Latino residents of any race comprised 2.3% of the population.

The median age was 43.4 years, 23.4% of residents were under the age of 18, and 21.9% were 65 years of age or older; for every 100 females there were 100.1 males, and for every 100 females age 18 and over there were 100.3 males.

There were 3,608 households in the county, of which 27.1% had children under the age of 18 living in them; 52.5% of households were married-couple households, 20.1% were households with a male householder and no spouse or partner present, and 21.9% were households with a female householder and no spouse or partner present. About 31.3% of all households were made up of individuals and 15.3% had someone living alone who was 65 years of age or older.

There were 4,058 housing units, of which 3,608 were occupied, leaving 11.1% vacant; among occupied units, 77.3% were owner-occupied and 22.7% were renter-occupied, with a homeowner vacancy rate of 2.0% and a rental vacancy rate of 11.4%.

Less than 0.1% of residents lived in urban areas, while 100.0% lived in rural areas.

=== 2010 census ===
The 2010 census recorded a population of 8,898 in the county, with a population density of 20.7/sq mi (8.0/km^{2}). There were 4,238 housing units, of which 3,689 were occupied.

=== 2000 census ===
As of the 2000 census, there were 9,422 people, 3,811 households, and 2,560 families residing in the county. The population density was 22 people per square mile (8.5 people/km^{2}). There were 4,239 housing units at an average density of 10 units per square mile (3.9 units/km^{2}). The racial makeup of the county was 98.44% White, 0.13% Black or African American, 0.11% Native American, 0.30% Asian, 0.01% Pacific Islander, 0.37% from other races, and 0.65% from two or more races. 0.87% of the population were Hispanic or Latino of any race.

There were 3,811 households, out of which 28.30% had children under the age of 18 living with them, 56.70% were married couples living together, 7.00% had a female householder with no husband present, and 32.80% were non-families. 28.70% of all households were made up of individuals, and 14.60% had someone living alone who was 65 years of age or older. The average household size was 2.42 and the average family size was 2.98.

In the county, the population was spread out, with 25.40% under the age of 18, 7.30% from 18 to 24, 24.60% from 25 to 44, 23.40% from 45 to 64, and 19.30% who were 65 years of age or older. The median age was 40 years. For every 100 females there were 94.50 males. For every 100 females age 18 and over, there were 91.10 males.

The median income for a household in the county was $30,876, and the median income for a family was $38,352. Males had a median income of $31,243 versus $21,293 for females. The per capita income for the county was $15,341. About 8.40% of families and 13.70% of the population were below the poverty line, including 19.10% of those under age 18 and 9.60% of those age 65 or over.

== Communities ==
=== Cities ===
- Chariton
- Derby
- Lucas
- Russell
- Williamson

=== Townships ===
- Benton
- Cedar
- English
- Jackson
- Liberty
- Lincoln
- Otter Creek
- Pleasant
- Union
- Warren
- Washington
- Whitebreast

=== Unincorporated areas ===
- Norwood

=== Population ranking ===
The population ranking of the following table is based on the 2020 census of Lucas County.

† county seat

Rank	City/Town/etc.	Municipal type	Population (2020 Census)
1	† Chariton	City	4,193
2	Russell	City	472
3	Lucas	City	172
4	Williamson	City	120
5	Derby	City	90

== Education ==
School districts include:

- Chariton Community School District
- Clarke Community School District
- Mormon Trail Community School District
- Southeast Warren Community School District
- Wayne Community School District

Former school districts:

- Russell Community School District - Involuntarily dissolved on January 1, 2008.

== Notable people ==
- T. J. Hockenson, Minnesota Vikings tight end (2022–Present)
- John L. Lewis, labor union

== Politics ==
United States presidential election results for Lucas County, Iowa
Year	Republican		Democratic		Third party(ies)	
Year	No.	%	No.	%	No.	%
1896	1,859	52.43%	1,621	45.71%	66	1.86%
1900	2,225	57.58%	1,488	38.51%	151	3.91%
1904	2,259	65.73%	878	25.55%	300	8.73%
1908	1,757	55.41%	1,267	39.96%	147	4.64%
1912	939	32.11%	968	33.11%	1,017	34.78%
1916	1,672	47.91%	1,536	44.01%	282	8.08%
1920	3,775	68.56%	1,463	26.57%	268	4.87%
1924	3,288	52.64%	824	13.19%	2,134	34.17%
1928	3,811	66.01%	1,888	32.70%	74	1.28%
1932	2,381	39.84%	3,434	57.46%	161	2.69%
1936	3,414	46.25%	3,773	51.11%	195	2.64%
1940	3,806	53.24%	3,255	45.53%	88	1.23%
1944	3,139	54.94%	2,526	44.21%	48	0.84%
1948	2,656	48.51%	2,697	49.26%	122	2.23%
1952	3,921	63.09%	2,217	35.67%	77	1.24%
1956	3,397	58.25%	2,431	41.68%	4	0.07%
1960	3,512	59.88%	2,344	39.97%	9	0.15%
1964	1,935	36.79%	3,310	62.93%	15	0.29%
1968	2,543	53.18%	1,942	40.61%	297	6.21%
1972	2,851	60.79%	1,759	37.51%	80	1.71%
1976	2,071	42.32%	2,733	55.84%	90	1.84%
1980	2,593	52.61%	1,989	40.35%	347	7.04%
1984	2,630	51.72%	2,422	47.63%	33	0.65%
1988	1,776	41.86%	2,454	57.84%	13	0.31%
1992	1,734	37.10%	2,072	44.33%	868	18.57%
1996	1,586	37.68%	2,168	51.51%	455	10.81%
2000	2,262	52.57%	1,934	44.95%	107	2.49%
2004	2,543	55.63%	1,987	43.47%	41	0.90%
2008	2,330	52.06%	2,029	45.33%	117	2.61%
2012	2,254	52.14%	1,987	45.96%	82	1.90%
2016	2,877	66.08%	1,239	28.46%	238	5.47%
2020	3,287	70.99%	1,284	27.73%	59	1.27%
2024	3,400	73.18%	1,169	25.16%	77	1.66%

== See also ==
- National Register of Historic Places listings in Lucas County, Iowa
- Lucas County Courthouse
- Red Haw State Park
