= Lucas, Iowa =

- City
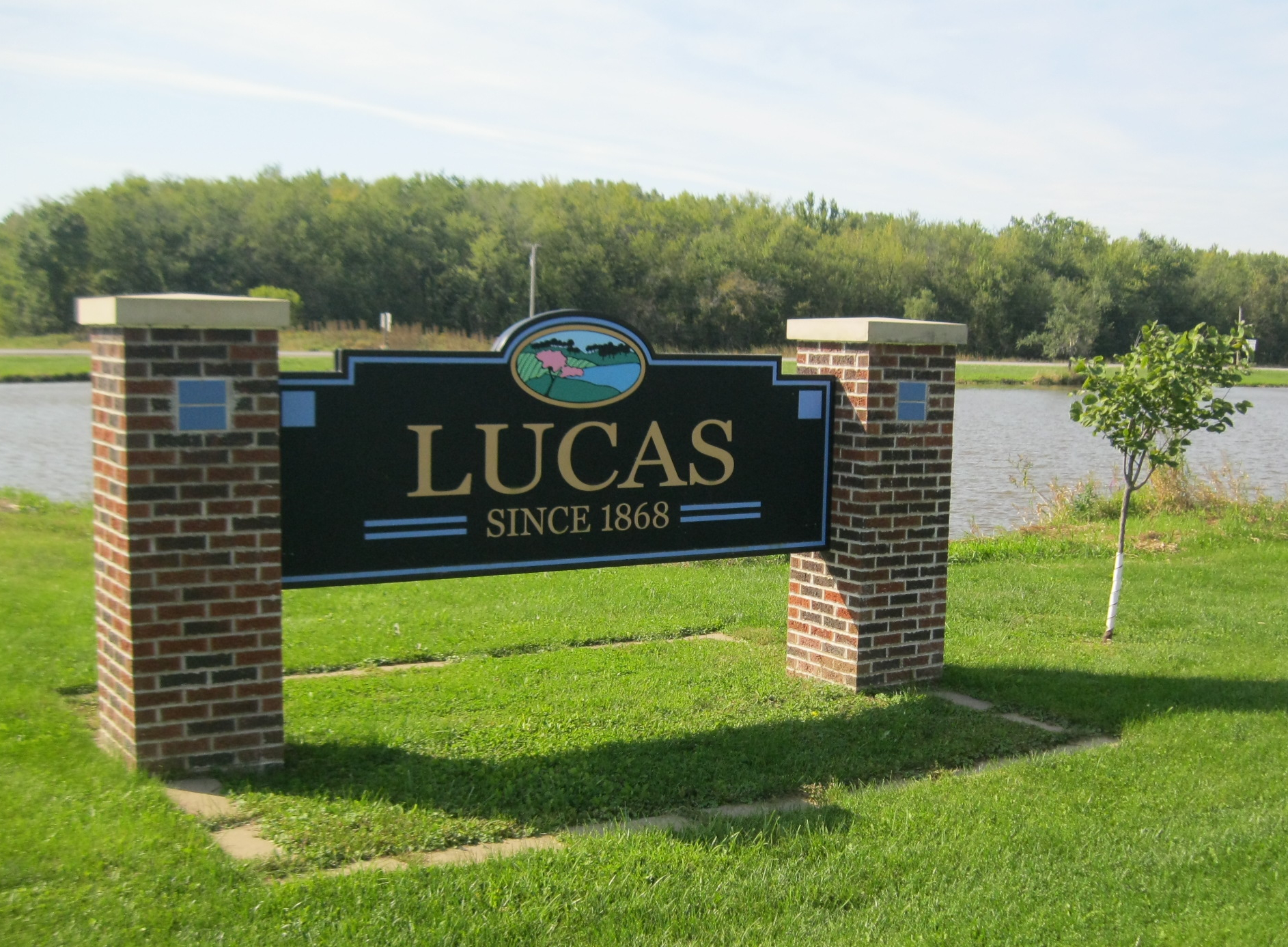
- Lucas, Iowa

- Location of Lucas, Iowa
- Coordinates: 41°01′56″N 93°27′40″W
- Country: USA
- State: Iowa
- County: Lucas

Area
  - Total: 0.99 sq mi (2.57 km^{2})
  - Land: 0.98 sq mi (2.54 km^{2})
  - Water: 0.0077 sq mi (0.02 km^{2})
- Elevation: 961 ft (293 m)

Population (2020)
  - Total: 172
  - Density: 175/sq mi (67.6/km^{2})
- Time zone: UTC-6 (Central (CST))
  - Summer (DST): UTC-5 (CDT)
- ZIP code: 50151
- Area code: 641
- FIPS code: 19-47100
- GNIS feature ID: 2395783

Lucas is a city in Lucas County, Iowa, United States. The population was 172 at the time of the 2020 census.

== History ==
The Burlington and Missouri River Railroad Company established a station at Lucas in 1866, named after Lucas County and Robert Lucas. A plat for the town was filed on May 9, 1868 and the town was incorporated on March 18, 1887. The town grew slowly until coal was discovered in the area.

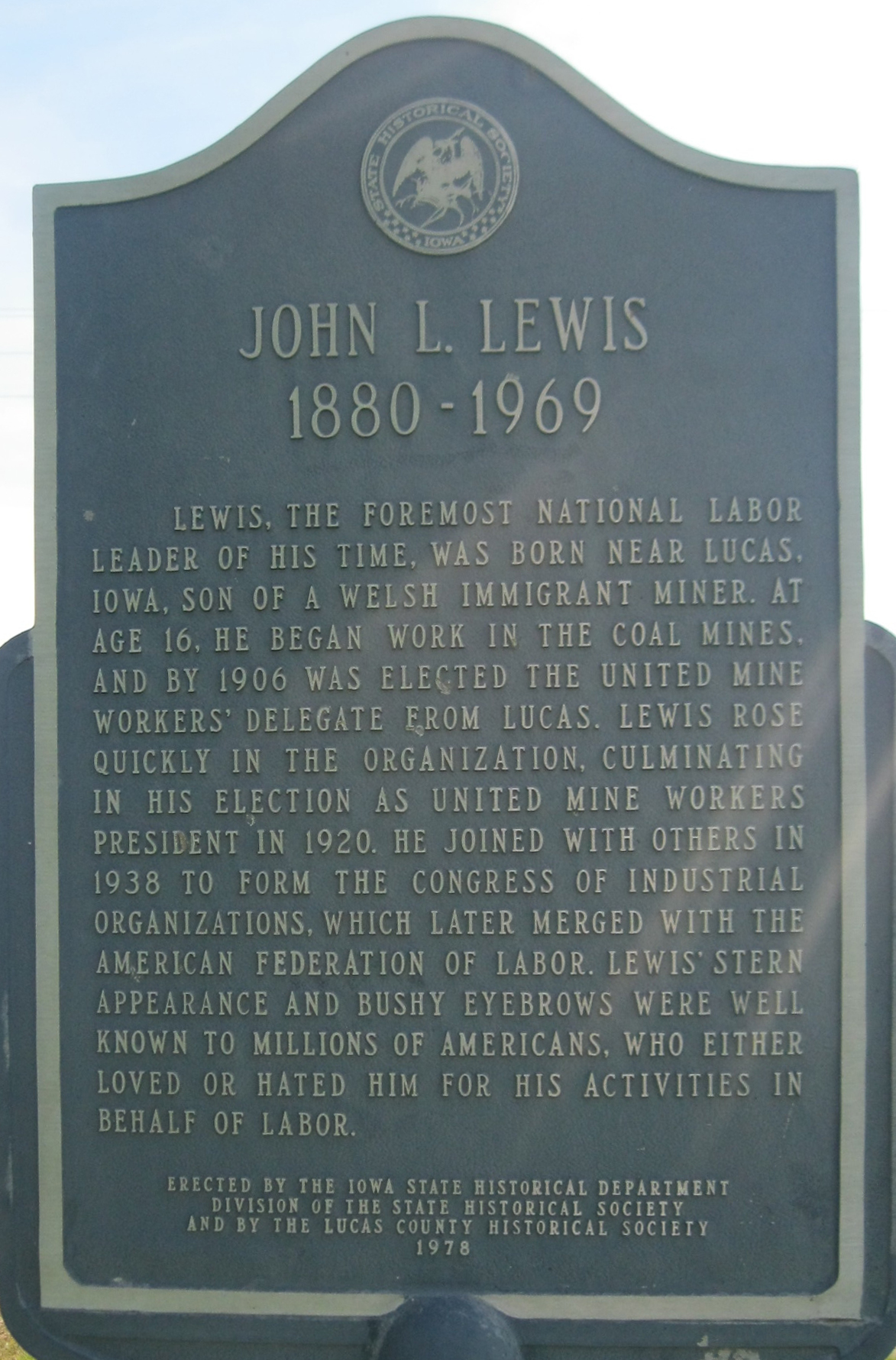
John L. Lewis, United Mine Workers President plaque located in Lucas, Iowa

In 1876, the Whitebreast Coal and Mining Company began working a 250-foot (76 m) shaft one mile (1.6 km) east of Lucas. This proved successful, and in 1878, they platted a company town there, which they named Cleveland 41°1′57.21″N 93°26′38.71″W. By 1880, Cleveland had a population of 380, and the first mine was producing 650 to 700 tons of coal per day by the labor of 280 miners and 33 mule drivers. A second mine was opened 3/4 mile from the first, and the two mines sold coal to the Chicago, Burlington and Quincy Railroad, and several other railroads to the south and west. The Cleveland post office was open from 1877 to 1891 and then reopened between 1899 and 1908. Very little remained of Cleveland by the 1930s.

In 1893, the Lucas Coal Company was working a two-foot coal seam 83 feet (25 m) down, employing 24 men.

The Big Hill mine in Lucas worked a 4-foot-thick (1.2 m) coal seam 274 feet (84 m) below the surface using room and pillar methods, with a shaft not far from the Burlington station. This mine was closed in April 1904 and stripped of equipment, but by mid-1905, plans were in place to reopen it. The reopening lasted until 1907, when the mine was again closed, as the rock directly above the coal was sandstone and it was saturated with water. This mine is noteworthy because John L Lewis got his first coal mining job here, before going on to head the United Mine Workers of America.

United Mine Workers local 799 was organized in Lucas in 1899; its membership was 121 in 1902, but it fell to 57 in 1907 and just 24 in 1912. UMW local 1120 was organized in Cleveland in 1899; membership was 350 in 1902, fell to 125 in 1907 and no membership was reported in 1912. Mine wages varied from $2.36 to $2.56 per day in Cleveland in 1907 (there are no wage figures for Lucas that year).

In 1919, Lucas was home to the second most productive coal mine in Iowa, Mine No. 2 of the Central Iowa Fuel Company. This produced 217,169 tons of coal that year and employed 360 men. The last coal mine in the Lucas area was the Iowa-Nebraska Mine, closed in 1923. This mine was located about 1.5 miles (2.4 km) southwest of Lucas (41°0′50.65″N 93°28′50.03″W). The former mine site is now in the Lucas Unit of the Stephens State Forest. The site is now the site of Mine Pond and the Mine Pond Campground in the state forest. This forest was a base of operations for the Civilian Conservation Corps in the 1930s. The CCC established the pine and hardwood forest that now dominates this land.

== Geography ==
Lucas is located on the north bank of White Breast Creek, a tributary of the Des Moines River that flows east through the Southern Iowa drift plain.

According to the United States Census Bureau, the city has a total area of 0.98 square miles (2.54 km^{2}), of which 0.97 square miles (2.51 km^{2}) is land and 0.01 square miles (0.03 km^{2}) is water.

== Demographics ==
Historical populations
Year	Pop.	±%
1880	981	—
1890	1,320	+34.6%
1900	1,132	−14.2%
1910	666	−41.2%
1920	614	−7.8%
1930	514	−16.3%
1940	534	+3.9%
1950	420	−21.3%
1960	357	−15.0%
1970	247	−30.8%
1980	292	+18.2%
1990	224	−23.3%
2000	243	+8.5%
2010	216	−11.1%
2020	172	−20.4%
Iowa Data Center; Source: U.S. Decennial Census

=== 2020 census ===
As of the census of 2020, there were 172 people, 76 households, and 44 families residing in the city. The population density was 175.1 inhabitants per square mile (67.6/km^{2}). There were 92 housing units at an average density of 93.7 per square mile (36.2/km^{2}). The racial makeup of the city was 90.7% White, 0.6% Black or African American, 0.0% Native American, 0.0% Asian, 0.0% Pacific Islander, 0.0% from other races and 8.7% from two or more races. Hispanic or Latino persons of any race comprised 1.2% of the population.

Of the 76 households, 31.6% of which had children under the age of 18 living with them, 52.6% were married couples living together, 1.3% were cohabitating couples, 17.1% had a female householder with no spouse or partner present and 28.9% had a male householder with no spouse or partner present. 42.1% of all households were non-families. 39.5% of all households were made up of individuals, 18.4% had someone living alone who was 65 years old or older.

The median age in the city was 36.5 years. 23.3% of the residents were under the age of 20; 7.0% were between the ages of 20 and 24; 29.1% were from 25 and 44; 19.2% were from 45 and 64; and 21.5% were 65 years of age or older. The gender makeup of the city was 50.0% male and 50.0% female.

=== 2010 census ===
As of the census of 2010, there were 216 people, 89 households, and 59 families residing in the city. The population density was 222.7 inhabitants per square mile (86.0/km^{2}). There were 112 housing units at an average density of 115.5 per square mile (44.6/km^{2}). The racial makeup of the city was 95.4% White, 0.5% African American, and 4.2% from two or more races. Hispanic or Latino of any race were 1.9% of the population.

There were 89 households, of which 27.0% had children under the age of 18 living with them, 50.6% were married couples living together, 6.7% had a female householder with no husband present, 9.0% had a male householder with no wife present, and 33.7% were non-families. 28.1% of all households were made up of individuals, and 12.3% had someone living alone who was 65 years of age or older. The average household size was 2.43 and the average family size was 2.88.

The median age in the city was 47.4 years. 22.2% of residents were under the age of 18; 7% were between the ages of 18 and 24; 16.7% were from 25 to 44; 34.2% were from 45 to 64; and 19.9% were 65 years of age or older. The gender makeup of the city was 53.2% male and 46.8% female.

=== 2000 census ===
As of the census of 2000, there were 243 people, 95 households, and 68 families residing in the city. The population density was 251.4 inhabitants per square mile (97.1/km^{2}). There were 101 housing units at an average density of 104.5 per square mile (40.3/km^{2}). The racial makeup of the city was 98.77% White, 0.82% Asian, and 0.41% from two or more races. Hispanic or Latino of any race were 0.82% of the population.

There were 95 households, out of which 37.9% had children under the age of 18 living with them, 60.0% were married couples living together, 3.2% had a female householder with no husband present, and 28.4% were non-families. 26.3% of all households were made up of individuals, and 8.4% had someone living alone who was 65 years of age or older. The average household size was 2.56 and the average family size was 3.07.

In the city, the population was spread out, with 28.4% under the age of 18, 7.4% from 18 to 24, 31.3% from 25 to 44, 21.4% from 45 to 64, and 11.5% who were 65 years of age or older. The median age was 36 years. For every 100 females, there were 91.3 males. For every 100 females age 18 and over, there were 100.0 males.

The median income for a household in the city was $31,250, and the median income for a family was $38,750. Males had a median income of $26,458 versus $21,607 for females. The per capita income for the city was $13,145. About 6.9% of families and 10.6% of the population were below the poverty line, including 13.4% of those under the age of eighteen and none of those 65 or over.

== Education ==
Chariton Community School District serves the community. The district operates Chariton High School.

== Notable people ==
- George Bennard, composer of "The Old Rugged Cross"
- John L. Lewis, president of the UMW
- Thomas W. Williams, school principal in Lucas at the age of 18
