= Bluegrass Conference (Iowa) =

Iowa High School athletic conference

- Conference: IHSAA / IGHSAU
- Founded: 1939
- Sports fielded: 13
- No. of teams: 10
- Region: South Central Iowa
- Website: https://www.bluegrassconference.org/

The Bluegrass Conference is a high school sports league in Iowa. Located in south-central Iowa, the conference is home to some of the smallest schools in the state, including the smallest public school district in Iowa, Diagonal.

== Members ==
Institution	Location	Mascot	Colors	Affiliation	2026-2027 BEDS
East Division
Melcher-Dallas	Melcher-Dallas	Saints		Public	67
Moravia	Moravia	Mohawks		Public	88
Moulton-Udell	Moulton	Eagles		Public	38
Seymour	Seymour	Warriors		Public	44
Twin Cedars	Bussey	Sabers		Public	64
West Division
Ankeny Christian Academy	Ankeny	Eagles		Private	121
Diagonal	Diagonal	Maroons		Public	27
Lamoni	Lamoni	Demons		Public	59
Mormon Trail	Garden Grove	Saints		Public	59
Murray	Murray	Mustangs		Public	77

== History ==
The conference originated before 1960. Some of the members in the early days included Osceola, Bedford, Mount Ayr, Lamoni, Seymour, Corydon, and Leon. Lenox and Mormon Trail of Humeston joined the conference in 1960, as Osceola departed. In 1962, four schools left the conference to join the newly formed Tall Corn Conference. This left the conference with Lamoni, Leon, Mormon Trail, Corydon, Seymour, and Moravia. As the years went by, some schools changed names and Southeast Warren and Melcher-Dallas joined the conference, so that by 1990 the conference looked like this:

- Lamoni
- Melcher-Dallas
- Moravia
- Mormon Trail
- Wayne
- S.E. Warren
- Central Decatur (of Leon)
- Seymour

After losing some of the bigger schools to other conferences, the Bluegrass reached out to many of the smaller schools in the area. These new schools were some of the smallest in the state. The Bluegrass Conference operated with 12 teams for a while, but with three schools having been shut down in recent years, the conference is now left with just nine schools. In 2002, Fox Valley Community School in Milton closed its doors, after the district voted to shut down the school and allow the pupils to open enroll where they wished. The next casualty came in 2008, when Russell became the first public school to be shut down by the state in over a decade. East Monona had been the most recent. Then, in 2010, Lineville-Clio was closed by the state. Currently, the conference hosts three of the six smallest public schools in the state, with Diagonal (26 BEDs), Moulton-Udell (38), and Mormon Trail (45).

Starting in the 2013–14 academic year, the following schools joined the conference:

- Ankeny Christian Academy (Ankeny)
- Grand View Christian School (Des Moines)
- Iowa Christian Academy (West Des Moines)
- Orient-Macksburg

Despite the enrollment figures, all schools but Diagonal and Orient-Macksburg play football, fielding 8-man teams. Before Russell and Fox Valley shut down, they also played 8-man football. Most of the schools also field teams in baseball, softball, volleyball, basketball, and track and field.

Iowa Christian Academy officials announced on November 28, 2018, that the school would close. Students were encouraged to attend Grandview Christian School.

On June 11, 2024, Orient-Macksburg School Board voted to dissolve the school district, citing low enrollment, staffing issues, and financial shortfalls. This will effectively remove them from the conference.

== Conference Champs ==
=== Boys Basketball ===
- 2025-2026 ACA
- 2024-2025 ACA
- 2023-2024 ACA
- 2022-2023 Moravia
- 2021-2022 ACA
- 2020-2021 ACA
- 2019-2020 Lamoni
- 2018-2019 ACA
- 2017-2018 ACA
- 2016-2017 Grand View Christian
- 2015-2016 Grand View Christian
- 2014-2015 Grand View Christian
- 2013-2014 Lamoni
- 2012-2013 Lamoni
- 2011-2012 Murray
- 2010-2011 Murray
- 2009-2010 Murray
- 2008-2009 Moulton-Udel
- 2007-2008 Moulton-Udel
- 2006-2007 Murray
- pre 2006-2007 No comfirmed champions

=== Girls Basketball ===
- 2025-2026 ACA
- 2024-2025 Lamoni
- 2023-2024 Melcher-Dallas
- 2022-2023 ACA
- 2021-2022 Lamoni
- 2020-2021 Moravia
- 2019-2020 Lamoni
- 2018-2019 Seymour
- 2017-2018 Seymour
- 2016-2017 Grand View Christian
- 2015-2016 Grand View Christian
- 2014-2015 Murray
- 2013-2014 Murray
- 2012-2013 Twin Cedars
- 2011-2012 Twin Cedars
- 2010-2011 Mormon Trail
- 2009-2010 Moulton-Udell
- 2008-2009 Lamoni
- 2007-2008 Twin Cedars
- pre 2006-2007 No comfirmed champions

=== Baseball ===
- 2024-2025 Moravia
- 2023-2024 ACA
- 2022-2023 Moravia
- 2021-2022 ACA
- 2020-2021 ACA
- 2019-2020 Lamoni
- 2018-2019 Lamoni
- 2017-2018 Moravia
- 2016-2017 Twin Cedars
- 2015-2016 Moravia
- 2014-2015 Iowa Christian Academy
- 2013-2014 Twin Cedars
- 2012-2013 Twin Cedars
- 2011-2012 Twin Cedars
- 2010-2011 Murray
- pre 2010-2011 No comfirmed champions

=== Boys Track ===
- 2024-2025 ACA
- 2023-2024 ACA
- 2022-2023 Moravia
- 2021-2022 Lamoni
- 2020-2021 Lamoni
- 2019-2020 canceled due to COVID-19
- 2018-2019 Lamoni
- pre 2018-2019 No comfirmed champions
