= J.J. McClung House =

Historic house in Iowa, United States

- U.S. National Register of Historic Places
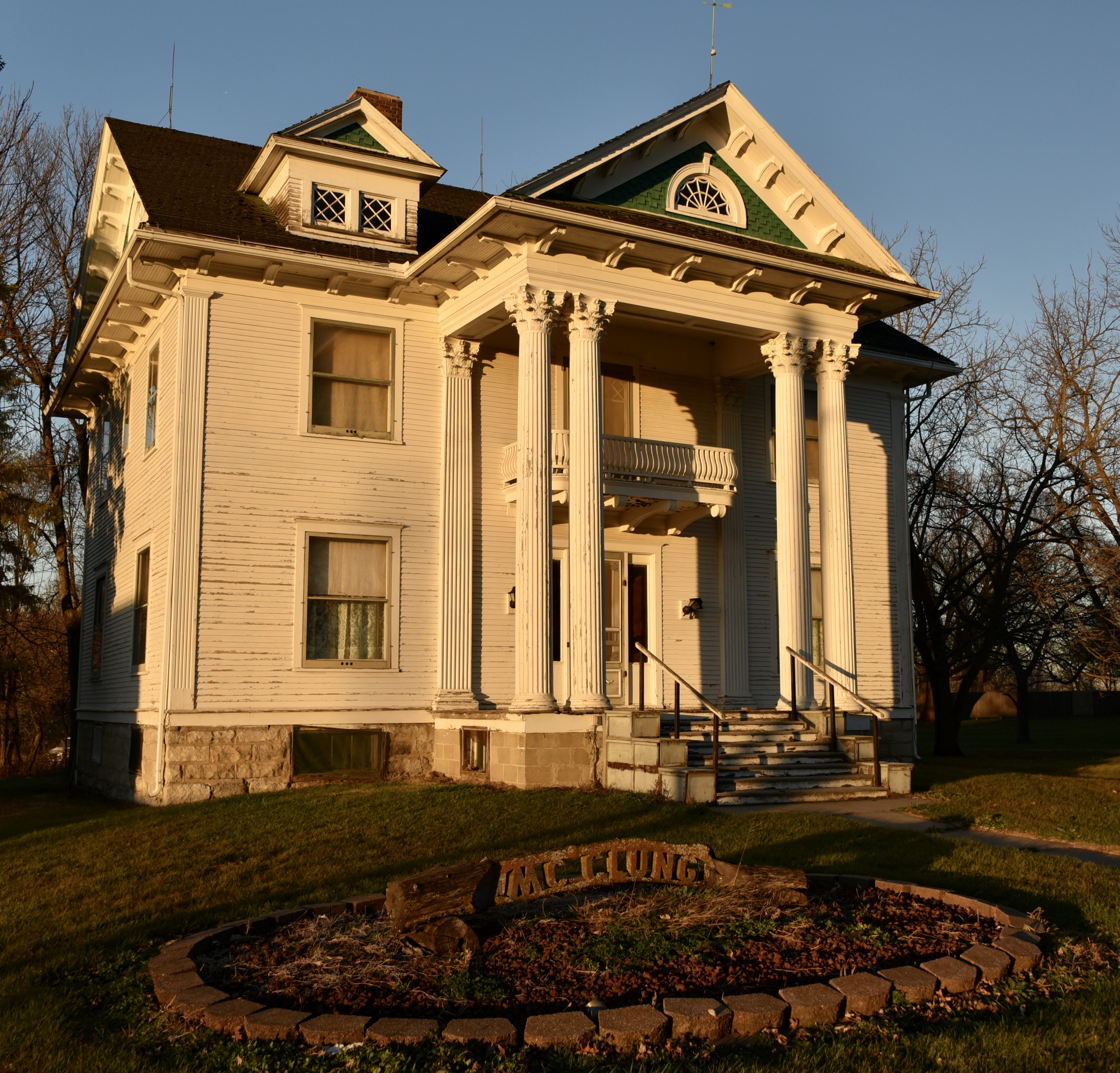

- Location within Iowa Location within the United States
- Location: Junction of Main and Vine Sts., Garden Grove, Iowa
- Coordinates: 40°49′38″N 93°37′37″W
- Area: less than one acre
- Built: 1908-1909
- Built by: Wiley Sells
- Architect: Charles F. Church
- Architectural style: Neoclassical; Colonial Revival
- NRHP reference No.: 90001856
- Added to NRHP: December 6, 1990

The J.J. McClung House is a historic structure located in Garden Grove, Iowa, United States. A native of Ohio, James Johnson McClung moved to Garden Grove in 1879. He owned and operated a livery and dray business, where he carried the mail from the train to the post office for 53 years. With the advent of the automobile, he built the first service station in Decatur County in 1925. The house was built from 1908 to 1909 by Wiley Sells of Leon, Iowa and remained in the McClung family for 80 years. It was added to the National Register of Historic Places in 1990.

The McClung house is a 2½-story, frame structure. Lamoni, Iowa architect Charles F. Church designed the house in a combination of the Neoclassical and Colonial Revival styles. The Neoclassical Revival elements include full height entry porch that is supported by paired fluted columns in the Corinthian order. They support a plain entablature and triangular pediment. Other Neoclassical elements include the second story porch treatment, architrave window trim, and fluted pilaster corner boards. The Colonial Revival elements are found in the Palladian windows located in the gable ends, the lunette in the porch pediment, and the scalloped brackets under the eaves. It is currently owned by author Sarah A. Chrisman and her husband Gabriel.
