= David Dancer =

American politician in Iowa (1896–1982)

Member of the Iowa House of Representatives from the 6th district
- In office 14 January 1935 – 10 January 1943
- Preceded by: Walter Osborn
- Succeeded by: Roy B. Hawkins

Personal details
- Born: David Anderson Dancer; 7 October 1896 Lamoni, Iowa, United States
- Died: 11 October 1982 (aged 86) Sun City, Arizona, United States
- Party: Republican
- Spouse: Florence Messerli (m. 1917)
- Education: Graceland University; University of Washington; University of Iowa
- Occupation: farmer

David Anderson Dancer (7 October 1896 – 11 October 1982) was an American politician.

== Personal life and early career ==
Born in Lamoni, Iowa, on 7 October 1896, Dancer attended school in his hometown, and enrolled at Graceland College and the University of Washington before graduating from the University of Iowa in 1917. He served in the United States Army with the rank of first lieutenant for twenty two months during World War I. After he ended his military service, Dancer returned to Iowa in 1919 as a farmer, serving on the board of directors for the Farmers Grain and Seed Company, as president of the Decatur Farm Bureau and chairman of the board of the Lamoni Cooperative Creamery Association.

David Dancer married Florence Messerli, a native of West Union, Iowa, on 17 November 1917. He died on 11 October 1982, in Sun City, Arizona.

== Public service career ==
Dancer served ten years on the Lamoni City Council before winning four consecutive terms as a Republican Party legislator of the Iowa House of Representatives for District 6 between 14 January 1935 and 10 January 1943. During the 48th Iowa General Assembly from 1939 to 1941, he contested the house speakership, and lost. During his final term as a state representative, Dancer was speaker pro tempore. Dancer subsequently ran in the 1942 Republican party primary for the position of Secretary of Agriculture of Iowa. Following the loss in the primary, Dancer was appointed secretary of the Iowa Board of Regents from 1942, and stepped down from the position by 1968.

== Legacy ==
The University of Iowa named Dancer the recipient of its 1964 Distinguished Service Award, acknowledging "...the broad span of the years of his service to the people of Iowa," and his "...rare trilogy of strengths; tenaciousness, an infinite patience, a selflessness remarkable by any measure." His tenure as secretary of the Iowa Board of Regents was also commemorated by Iowa State University's inaugural Honorary Alumni Award in 1968, and the University of Northern Iowa's dedication of Dancer Hall, a residence hall constructed between 1967 and 1969.
