= Ankeny Christian Academy =

Private school in Ankeny, Iowa, United States

Coordinates: 41.732353°N 93.622338°W

Location
- 1604 West 1st Street; Ankeny, Iowa; United States

Information
- Type: Private Christian
- Established: 1993
- Grades: K-12
- Enrollment: 506 (2023-2024)
- Website: acaeagles.net

Ankeny Christian Academy (ACA) is a private Christian school located in Ankeny, Polk County, Iowa. It is an independent, non-denominational school serving students from preschool through 12th grade. The school is accredited by the state of Iowa.

== History ==
ACA began in February 1992. In August 1993, meeting in a church, ACA opened with 27 students and 3 teachers in grades kindergarten through sixth grade. For the next seven years, the school rented rooms in several churches and a remodeled warehouse office building. In the spring of 2000 it purchased property at 1604 West 1st St. as its permanent location.

ACA added secondary grades in the fall of 1996. The first senior class graduated in 2000.

== Sports ==
The junior high and high school sports program includes boys and girls golf, track and field, cross-country, girls volleyball, boys and girls basketball, and football. The athletic teams are called the Eagles. The school is a member of the Bluegrass Conference.

== Facilities ==
In April 2000 the school purchased a 50,000-square-foot (4,600 m^{2}) strip mall at 1604 West 1st Street, Ankeny, Iowa. It remodeled most of the facility into a school.

After initial remodeling the facility included 13 classrooms, a chapel/auditorium seating 360, a computer room, a recreation/physical education room, a music room, a library, and a lunchroom and kitchen. The preschool was completed in January 2002 with three additional classrooms and an office. A gymnasium was completed in November 2003, with the addition of locker rooms in 2008 and a weight room in 2009 but is now used as a storage room. A new secondary science lab opened in August 2009. In 2010 more space was converted from tenants to school; The school eventually converted the entire facility for the school's sole use.

== Staff and Faculty ==
The school is headed by Brent Knoll. The elementary portion of the school is principled by Dr. Jo Aukes. The high school principal is Joe Venema.

== Admission requirement ==
As of the 2026-2027 school year, each ACA student must come from a home where at least one parent or guardian is a professing born-again Christian.

== See also ==
- List of high schools in Iowa
