= Melcher-Dallas Community School District =

Public school district in Melcher-Dallas, Iowa, United States

Coordinates: 41.221560°N 93.241454°W

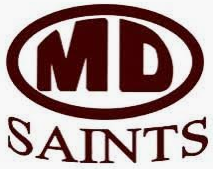

Location
- Melcher-Dallas, Iowa Marion County United States
- Coordinates: 41.221560, -93.241454

District information
- Type: Public
- Grades: K–12
- Superintendent: Scott Bridges
- Schools: 2
- Budget: $6,068,000 (2020-21)
- NCES District ID: 1918960

Students and staff
- Students: 330 (2022-23)
- Teachers: 26.88 FTE
- Staff: 34.47 FTE
- Student–teacher ratio: 12.28
- Athletic conference: Bluegrass
- District mascot: Saints
- Colors: Maroon and White

Other information
- Website: www.melcher-dallascsd.org

Melcher-Dallas Community School District is a rural public school district headquartered in Melcher-Dallas, Iowa.

The district is completely within Marion County. The district serves the city of Melcher-Dallas and surrounding rural areas.

The school's mascot is the Saints. Their colors are maroon and white.

== Schools ==
- Melcher-Dallas Elementary School
- Melcher-Dallas High School

== Melcher-Dallas High School ==
=== Athletics ===
The Saints compete in the Bluegrass Conference, including the following sports:

- Volleyball
- Football (8-man)
- Basketball (boys and girls)
- Wrestling (as part of Southeast Warren)
- Track and Field (boys and girls)
- Golf (boys and girls)
- Baseball
- Softball

== See also ==
- List of school districts in Iowa
- List of high schools in Iowa
