= Marysville, Iowa =

- City
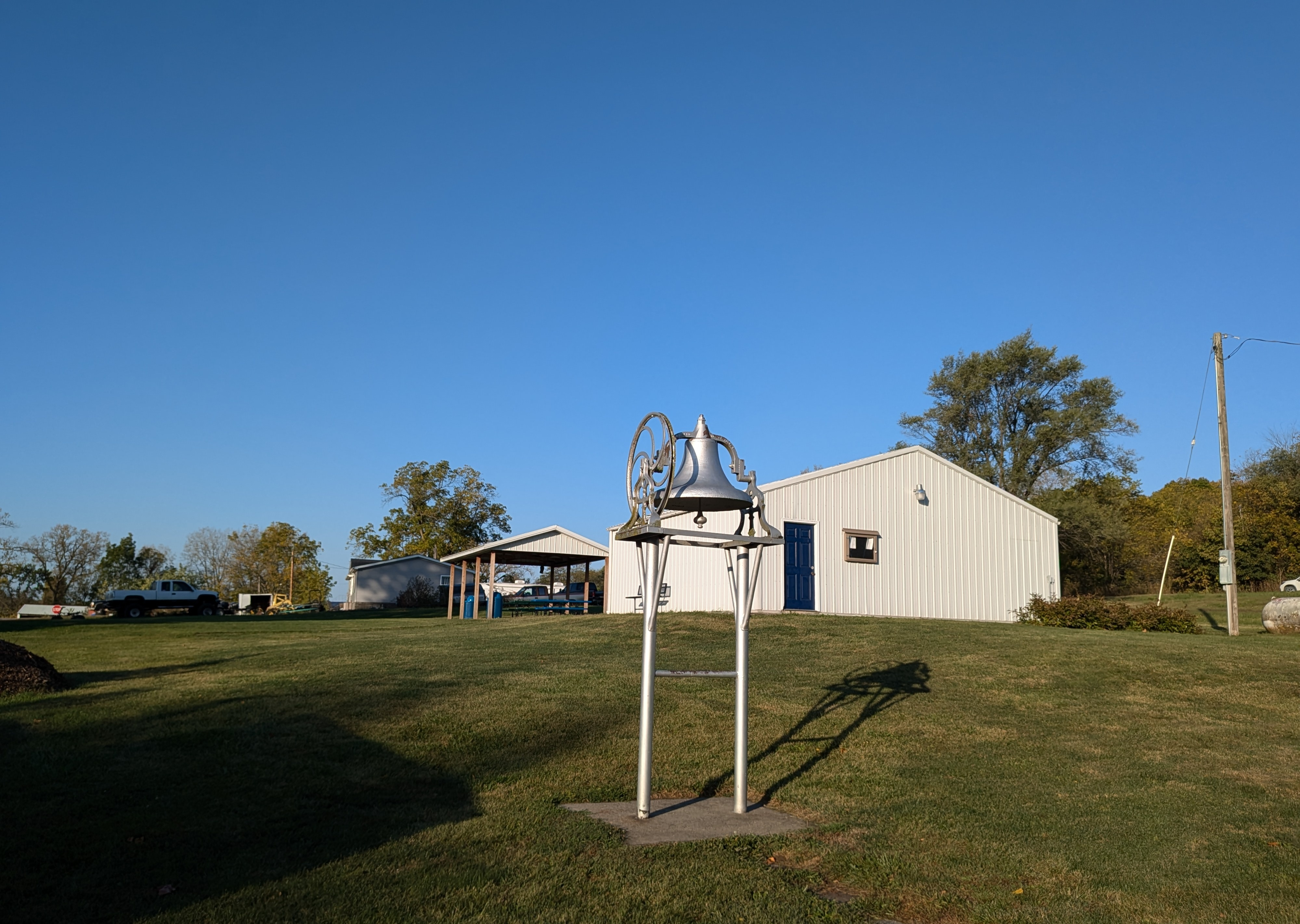
- The Town Hall in Marysville

- Location of Marysville, Iowa
- Coordinates: 41°10′51″N 92°57′14″W
- Country: USA
- State: Iowa
- County: Marion

Area
  - Total: 0.54 sq mi (1.40 km^{2})
  - Land: 0.54 sq mi (1.40 km^{2})
  - Water: 0 sq mi (0.00 km^{2})
- Elevation: 745 ft (227 m)

Population (2020)
  - Total: 44
  - Density: 81.7/sq mi (31.53/km^{2})
- Time zone: UTC-6 (Central (CST))
  - Summer (DST): UTC-5 (CDT)
- ZIP code: 50116
- Area code: 641
- FIPS code: 19-50070
- GNIS feature ID: 2395036

Marysville is a city in Marion County, Iowa, United States. The population was 44 at the time of the 2020 census.

== Geography ==
Marysville is located on the north bank of Cedar Creek, 15 miles southeast of Knoxville, the county seat of Marion County.

According to the United States Census Bureau, the city has a total area of 0.37 square miles (0.96 km^{2}), all of it land.

== History ==
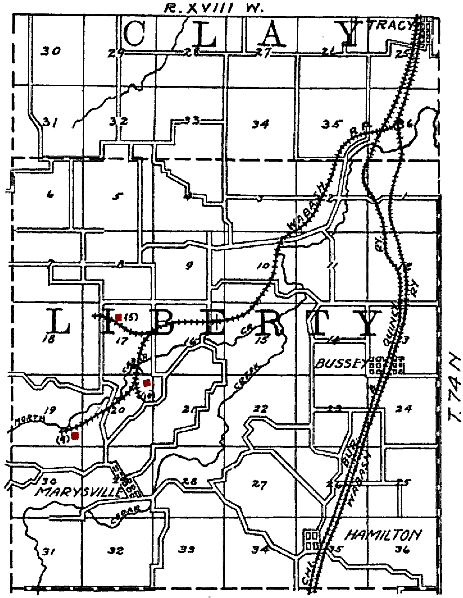
Map of the Marysville area from 1908, showing the railroads and coal mines (shown in red) of the region. Marysville is in the lower left quadrant.

There are numerous coal exposures on the banks of the branches of Cedar Creek both north and south of Marysville. In 1846, one exposure south of Marysville was found to be on fire, and this fire continued until June 1851, when heavy rains and flooding extinguished the fire.

The county surveyor, Joseph Brobst, filed a plat for Marysville on March 4, 1851, creating 26 lots and a public square that was later subdivided into additional lots. Marysville was named after the 5 members of the Brobst family who were named Mary. Originally, the Marysville post office was named Ely or Ely's. A Methodist church was established in 1867, a weekly newspaper, the Marysville Miner, was established in 1871, and a woolen factory was opened in 1872. Marysville was officially incorporated as a town in the late 1870s, and by 1910, it had three general stores, a post office, a 4-teacher public school, and telephone service.

A five-foot bed of coal was exposed along North Cedar Creek about 2 miles north of Marysville, and by 1867, several coal banks were open in the Marysville area and Jacob Kline had opened a mine about a mile north of Marysville, where the coal was 10 feet thick. By 1908, eleven different mines had been worked in the Marysville area, primarily by the Mammoth Vein Coal Company, which took over from the O.K. Coal Company in 1903. The Wabash Railroad built a 7-mile spur line to serve the mines.

=== Everist ===
The coal camp of Everist, Iowa was located about 2 miles north of Marysville near 41°12′35″N 92°57′40.72″W. The camp post office operated from 1905 to 1918. Everist served mines operated by the Mammoth Vein Coal Company and later the Empire Coal Company. Employment in 1914 was seasonal, varying from 90 to 300 men, and the mines at Everist shipped up to 800 carloads of coal per day circa 1914. The nearest railroad station was 6 miles away (by road) in Bussey. As is typical of coal camps, the coal company owned the houses in Everist and met the residents' needs through a company store. Scrip tokens for The Everist Mercantile Co. are occasionally found on the collectors' market. United Mine Workers local 981 was organized in Everist in 1905; by 1907, it had 480 members. Mine wages varied from $1.13 to $2.56 per day.

== Demographics ==
Historical populations
Year	Pop.	±%
1860	75	—
1870	266	+254.7%
1880	340	+27.8%
1890	348	+2.4%
1900	322	−7.5%
1910	319	−0.9%
1920	234	−26.6%
1930	149	−36.3%
1940	203	+36.2%
1950	165	−18.7%
1960	113	−31.5%
1970	91	−19.5%
1980	84	−7.7%
1990	65	−22.6%
2000	54	−16.9%
2010	66	+22.2%
2020	44	−33.3%
Source:"U.S. Census website". United States Census Bureau. and Iowa Data Center; Source: U.S. Decennial Census

=== 2020 census ===
As of the census of 2020, there were 44 people, 11 households, and 9 families residing in the city. The population density was 81.7 inhabitants per square mile (31.5/km^{2}). There were 20 housing units at an average density of 37.1 per square mile (14.3/km^{2}). The racial makeup of the city was 97.7% White, 0.0% Black or African American, 0.0% Native American, 0.0% Asian, 0.0% Pacific Islander, 0.0% from other races and 2.3% from two or more races. Hispanic or Latino persons of any race comprised 0.0% of the population.

Of the 11 households, 18.2% of which had children under the age of 18 living with them, 63.6% were married couples living together, 18.2% were cohabitating couples, 9.1% had a female householder with no spouse or partner present and 9.1% had a male householder with no spouse or partner present. 18.2% of all households were non-families. 0.0% of all households were made up of individuals, 0.0% had someone living alone who was 65 years old or older.

The median age in the city was 48.0 years. 34.1% of the residents were under the age of 20; 2.3% were between the ages of 20 and 24; 9.1% were from 25 and 44; 45.5% were from 45 and 64; and 9.1% were 65 years of age or older. The gender makeup of the city was 52.3% male and 47.7% female.

=== 2010 census ===
As of the census of 2010, there were 66 people, 23 households, and 21 families residing in the city. The population density was 178.4 inhabitants per square mile (68.9/km^{2}). There were 29 housing units at an average density of 78.4 per square mile (30.3/km^{2}). The racial makeup of the city was 93.9% White and 6.1% from two or more races.

There were 23 households, of which 39.1% had children under the age of 18 living with them, 82.6% were married couples living together, 8.7% had a female householder with no husband present, and 8.7% were non-families. 8.7% of all households were made up of individuals, and 4.3% had someone living alone who was 65 years of age or older. The average household size was 2.87 and the average family size was 3.05.

The median age in the city was 37.3 years. 30.3% of residents were under the age of 18; 6.1% were between the ages of 18 and 24; 28.7% were from 25 to 44; 24.2% were from 45 to 64; and 10.6% were 65 years of age or older. The gender makeup of the city was 51.5% male and 48.5% female.

=== 2000 census ===
As of the census of 2000, there were 54 people, 21 households, and 17 families residing in the city. The population density was 148.7 inhabitants per square mile (57.4/km^{2}). There were 23 housing units at an average density of 63.3 per square mile (24.4/km^{2}). The racial makeup of the city was 94.44% White, and 5.56% from two or more races.

There were 21 households, out of which 33.3% had children under the age of 18 living with them, 61.9% were married couples living together, 4.8% had a female householder with no husband present, and 19.0% were non-families. 19.0% of all households were made up of individuals, and 9.5% had someone living alone who was 65 years of age or older. The average household size was 2.57 and the average family size was 2.82.

In the city, the population was spread out, with 27.8% under the age of 18, 7.4% from 18 to 24, 31.5% from 25 to 44, 27.8% from 45 to 64, and 5.6% who were 65 years of age or older. The median age was 36 years. For every 100 females, there were 134.8 males. For every 100 females age 18 and over, there were 129.4 males.

The median income for a household in the city was $43,750, and the median income for a family was $53,750. Males had a median income of $34,375 versus $29,375 for females. The per capita income for the city was $17,135. None of the population and none of the families were below the poverty line.

== Education ==
The Twin Cedars Community School District operates local public schools.
