= Orient-Macksburg Community School District =

School district in Iowa

Location
- Orient, Iowa Adair, Madison, Adams, and Union counties United States
- Coordinates: 41.200590, -94.414181

District information
- Type: Public
- Grades: PreK-12
- Established: 1960
- Superintendent: Dr. Bill Szakacs
- Budget: $3,521,000 (2020-21)
- NCES District ID: 1921810

Students and staff
- Students: 150 (2022-23)
- Teachers: 12.37 FTE
- Staff: 21.16 FTE
- Student–teacher ratio: 12.13
- Athletic conference: Bluegrass Conference
- District mascot: Bulldogs
- Colors: Red and White

Other information
- Website: o-mschools.org

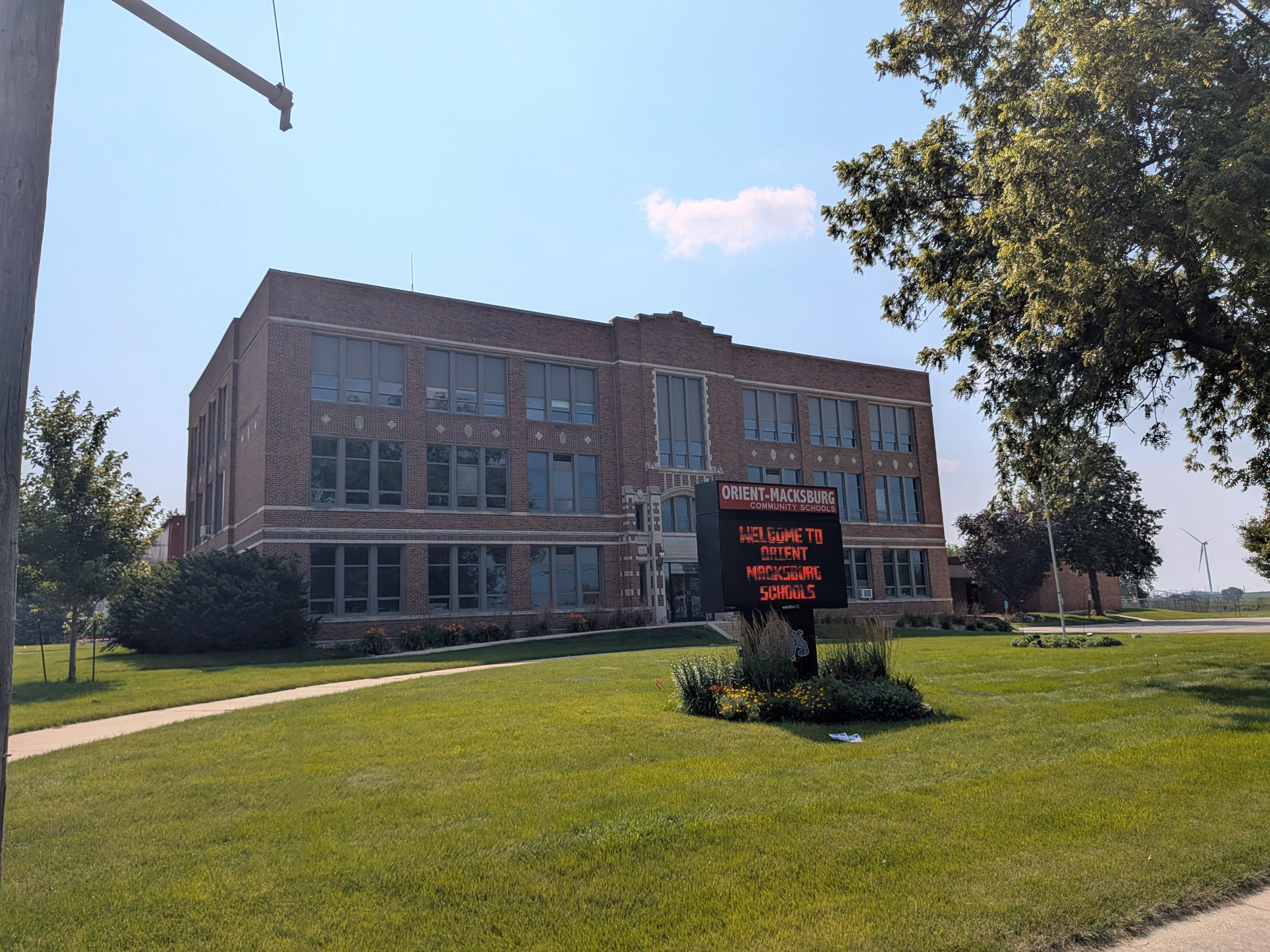
Orient-Macksburg Community School District facility

Orient-Macksburg Community School District (O-M) was a public school district headquartered in Orient, Iowa. It was in operation from 1960 until 2026, when the district dissolved.

The district, which included Orient and Macksburg, occupied portions of Adair, Madison, Adams, and Union counties in the southwest of the state.

== History ==
It is the result of the consolidation of schools in the communities of Orient and Macksburg, which occurred in fall 1960. All grades pre-kindergarten through 12th were housed in one property in Orient; the elementary portion was built in 1979. Another elementary addition, built through spring 1998, was funded by a bond approved by voters in March 1997. The school's mascot is the Bulldog.

As of June 11, 2024, the School Board had voted to dissolve the school district. Reasons cited were low enrollment, staffing issues, and financial shortfalls. There were 160 students in June 2024, and this was down to 87 in the final school year of the district's schools. On the final figure, principal Dan Grandfield stated, "That cannot sustain, we’re gonna be negative balance, so we can’t sustain a building anymore or a district." The last dissolution to have occurred was the 2015 dissolution of the Corwith-Wesley Community School District. The decision to dissolve was put up for a referendum for voters in the school district. The voters agreed to dissolve the district on a 203-18 basis according to unofficial results. Jeff Kruse, the superintendent, stated if the result had not been for a dissolution, "it is extremely likely that the Department of Education would come in and dissolve the district anyway."

The district's schools closed in 2025. For the 2025-2026 school year, the district did a whole grade sharing agreement, where the district sends students to another district's schools, with the Nodaway Valley Community School District, which took 57 students from Orient-Macksburg, or about 90% of the students from that district. Some students at Orient-Macksburg were scheduled to attend schools in the Creston Community School District, the Winterset Community School District, and the Diagonal Community School District.

In 2026 the district chose to sell the elementary building and to dismantle the secondary building.

The dissolution of the district itself was effective on July 1, 2026. The Nodaway Valley district and the Winterset district took territory from the former Orient-Macksburg district.

== Schools ==
- Orient-Macksburg Elementary School
- Orient-Macksburg High School

== Enrollment ==
The school district had a 2009-2010 certified enrollment of 212 students.

=== Total Enrollment (Basic Educational Data Survey (BEDS)) ===
Year	District Total	High School (9th-12th)	Middle School (6th-8th)	Elementary (K-5th)
2009-2010	178	73	34	71
2008-2009	187	88	37	62
2007-2008	219	99	54	66
2006-2007	240	110	57	73
2005-2006	257	119	60	78
2004-2005	302	118	83	101
2003-2004	308	105	96	107

=== Projections ===
The Orient-Macksburg School District is projected to continue a decline in enrollment. The Iowa Department of Education predicts an average decrease of 12 students per year over the next five years. That would peg the district's K-12 enrollment at 126 students for the 2013-2014 school year, with an estimated certified enrollment during that year of 154 students

== Faculty and staff ==
In 2009-2010, Orient-Macksburg employed 20 full-time and one part-time teachers. The average regular annual salary of a full-time instructor in the district was $39,081. An average beginning teacher saw a starting salary of $28,000.

Teachers at Orient-Macksburg carried an average 17.0 years of experience in the educational field, exceeding the state average of 14.8. Instructors have spent a slightly longer amount of time at Orient-Macksburg compared to those at most other Iowa school districts, with an average 12.6 years in the district. Statewide, teachers have been at their current district for 11.2 years. The average age of instructors at the school is 45.7 years-old, older than the state average of 42.2. Of the 20 teachers, one (5.0%) holds an advanced degree.

== Technology ==
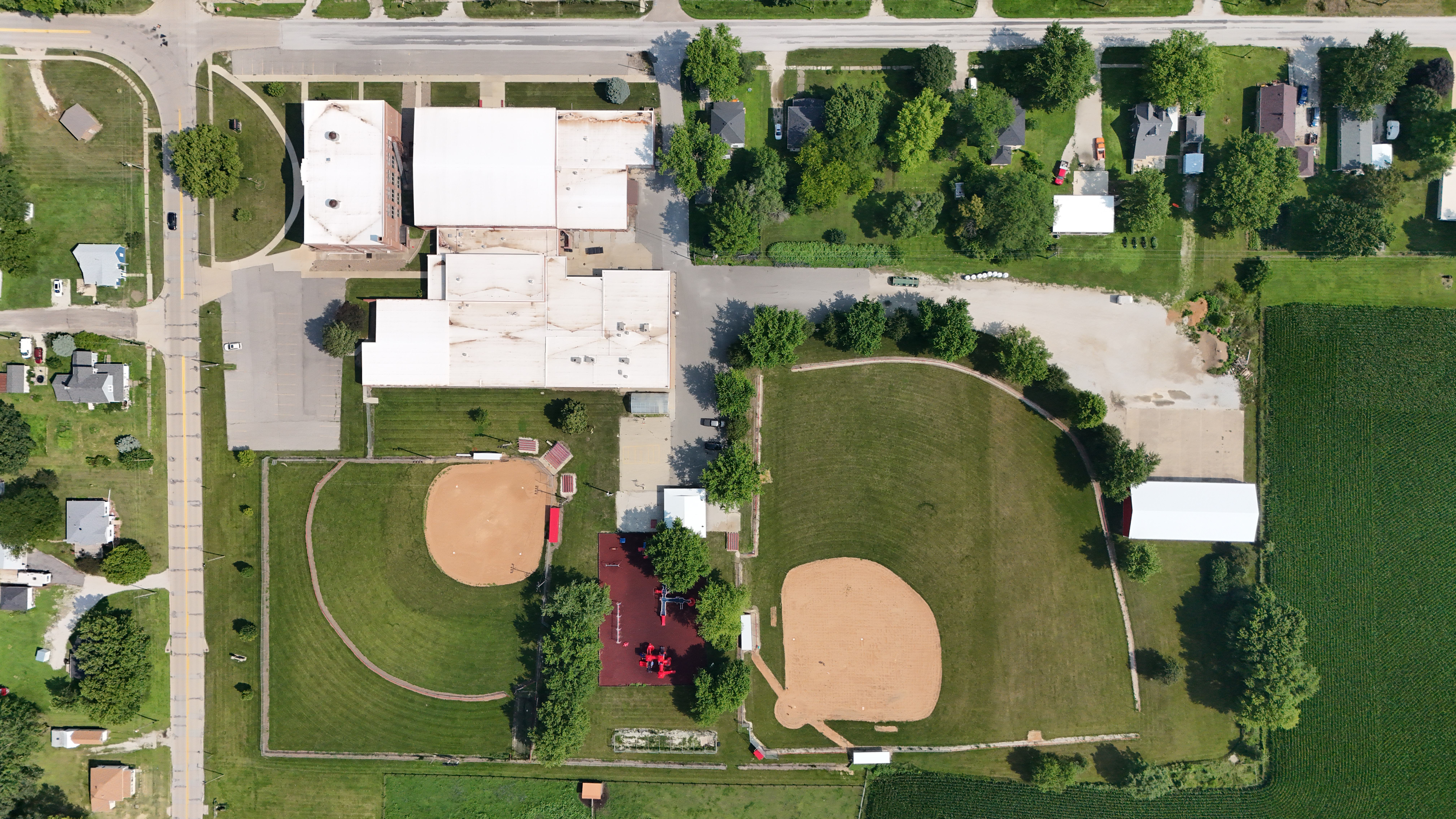
School campus in Orient

Orient-Macksburg's 2009-2010 student-to-computer ratio was 1.5 students per computer, nearly twice the statewide rate of 2.9 students per computer. In the 2005-2006 school year, the district offered three courses via telecommunication. One of those courses was available through the Iowa Communications Network (ICN). The other two were internet classes. During the 2009-2010 school year, the district's internet access was via the Iowa Communications Network, administered through its area education agency. Wireless networking is available throughout the facilities.

== Student makeup and diversity ==
In 2008-2009, the Orient-Macksburg School District reported 41.7% female students compared to 58.3% male students in K-12 enrollment. During the same school year, White students composed 94.1% of the student body in grades K-12, while 0.0% were African-American, 1.1% Asian, 2.1% Hispanic, and 2.7% Native American.

The school district reported 0.0% of enrollment as migrants or immigrants in 2006-2007.

== Early childhood/preschool ==
The Orient-Macksburg School District offers Shared Visions Preschool, which is accredited through the National Association for the Education of Young Children (NAEYC). The program is one of 141 in the state of Iowa with this certification.

An early childhood special education program is also offered at Orient-Macksburg.
