= Mormon Trail Community School District =

Public school district in Humeston, Iowa, United States

Coordinates: 40.855115°N 93.499848°W

Location
- Humeston, Iowa Decatur County, Iowa United States
- Coordinates: 40.855115, -93.499848

District information
- Type: Public Coed
- Grades: K–12
- Established: 1959
- Superintendent: Kerry Phillips
- Schools: 2
- Budget: $4,275,000 (2020-21)
- NCES District ID: 1931680

Students and staff
- Students: 223 (2022-23)
- Teachers: 21.53 FTE
- Staff: 30.59 FTE
- Student–teacher ratio: 10.36
- Athletic conference: Bluegrass
- District mascot: Saints
- Colors: Gold and Black

Other information
- Website: www.mormontrailcsdk12.org

Mormon Trail Community School District is a rural public school district headquartered in Humeston, Iowa. It operates Mormon Trail Elementary and Mormon Trail Junior/Senior High School.

It covers sections of Clarke, Decatur, Lucas, and Wayne counties. Communities in its service area include Humeston, Derby, Garden Grove, and Le Roy.

== History ==
The district was formed in 1959 as a consolidation of schools in Garden Grove, Humeston, and LeRoy.

The school's mascot is the Saints. Their colors are gold and black.

During the 1980s, the districts facilities began to draw scrutiny from the state department of education as well as the fire marshall. Neither school was ADA compliant, and the 1907 elementary school in Humeston had ventilation, fire code, and electrical violations. In 1996 voters passed a bond issue to build a new elementary school in humeston. The 1907 building was razed.

By 2022 the Garden Grove school was beginning to show its age with many of the same issues that the Humeston building had. Voters again approved a bond issue that same year for a Jr/Sr High School addition to the elementary school in Humeston. Students occupied the end facility for the first time in the fall of 2023.

== Schools ==
- Mormon Trail Elementary School, Humeston
- Mormon Trail Jr-Sr High School, Garden Grove

== Mormon Trail High School ==
=== Athletics ===
The Saints compete in the Bluegrass Conference, including the following sports:

- Volleyball
- Football (8-man)
- Basketball (boys and girls)
- Wrestling (with Central Decatur in the Pride of Iowa Conference)
- Track and Field (boys and girls)
- Baseball
- Softball

In 1995 students of the Lineville–Clio Community School District played for Mormon Trail teams, including American football and volleyball.

== See also ==
- List of school districts in Iowa
- List of high schools in Iowa
