= Hamilton, Iowa =

- City
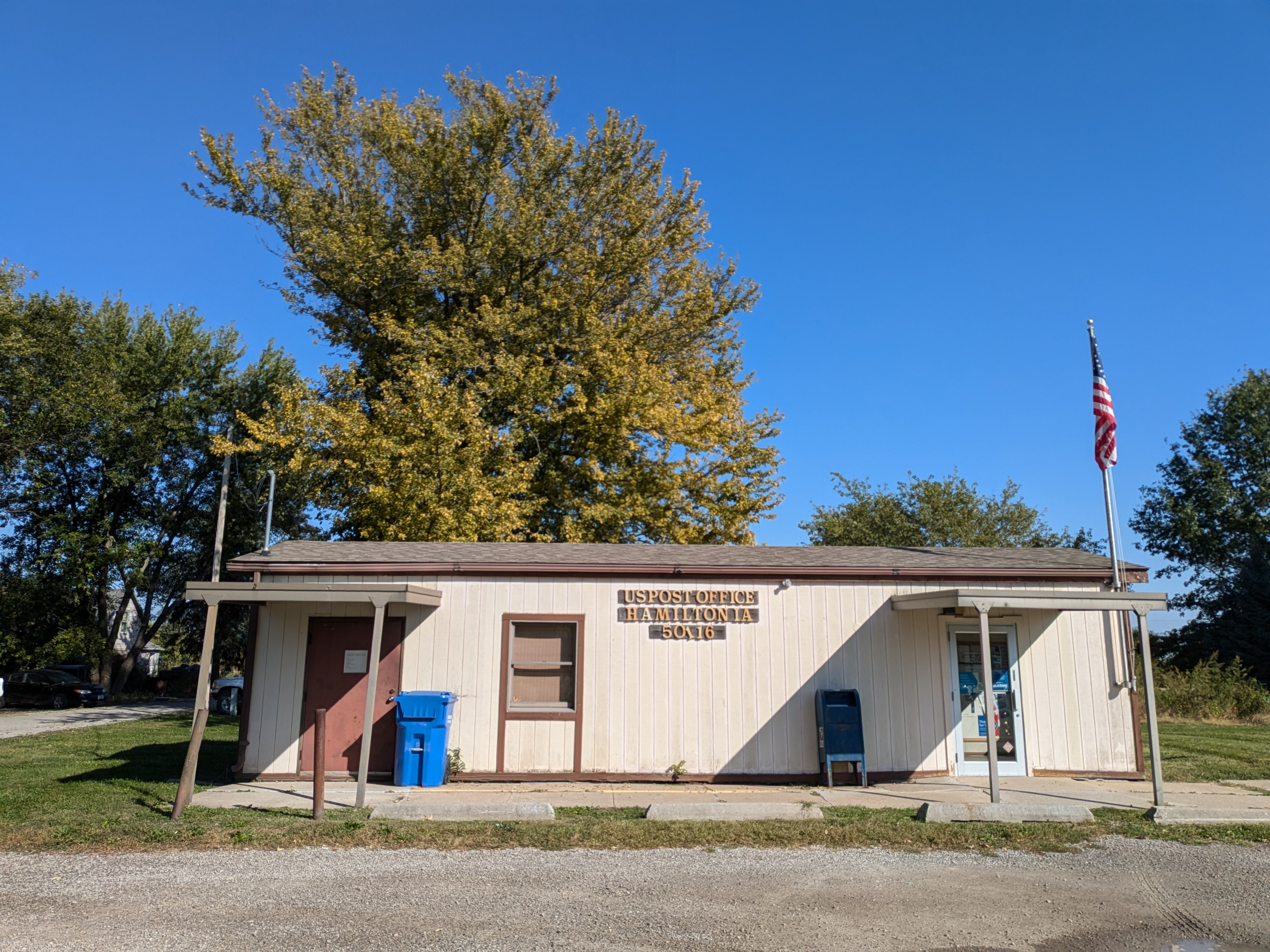
- Hamilton Post Office

- Location of Hamilton, Iowa
- Coordinates: 41°10′14″N 92°54′15″W
- Country: USA
- State: Iowa
- County: Marion

Area
  - Total: 0.51 sq mi (1.31 km^{2})
  - Land: 0.51 sq mi (1.31 km^{2})
  - Water: 0 sq mi (0.00 km^{2})
- Elevation: 912 ft (278 m)

Population (2020)
  - Total: 119
  - Density: 235.0/sq mi (90.75/km^{2})
- Time zone: UTC-6 (Central (CST))
  - Summer (DST): UTC-5 (CDT)
- ZIP code: 50116
- Area code: 641
- FIPS code: 19-33870
- GNIS feature ID: 2394276

Hamilton is a city in Marion County, Iowa, United States. The population was 119 at the time of the 2020 census.

== Geography ==
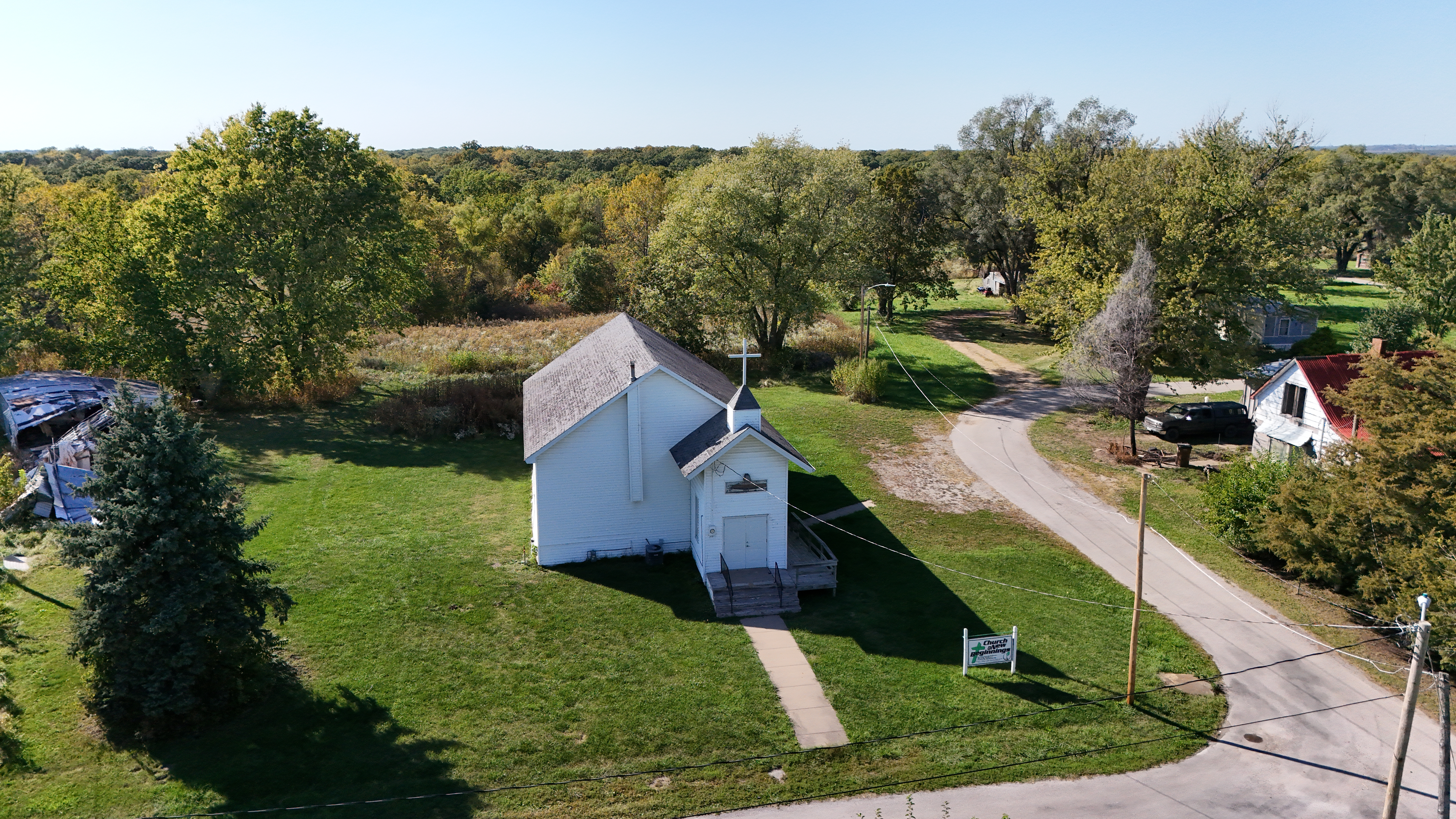
Church of New Beginnings in Hamilton

According to the United States Census Bureau, the city has a total area of 0.54 square miles (1.40 km^{2}), all of it land.

== Demographics ==
Historical populations
Year	Pop.	±%
1860	107	—
1870	133	+24.3%
1880	123	−7.5%
1890	116	−5.7%
1900	538	+363.8%
1910	391	−27.3%
1920	474	+21.2%
1930	296	−37.6%
1940	291	−1.7%
1950	245	−15.8%
1960	197	−19.6%
1970	186	−5.6%
1980	163	−12.4%
1990	115	−29.4%
2000	144	+25.2%
2010	130	−9.7%
2020	119	−8.5%
Source:"U.S. Census website". United States Census Bureau. and Iowa Data Center; Source: U.S. Decennial Census

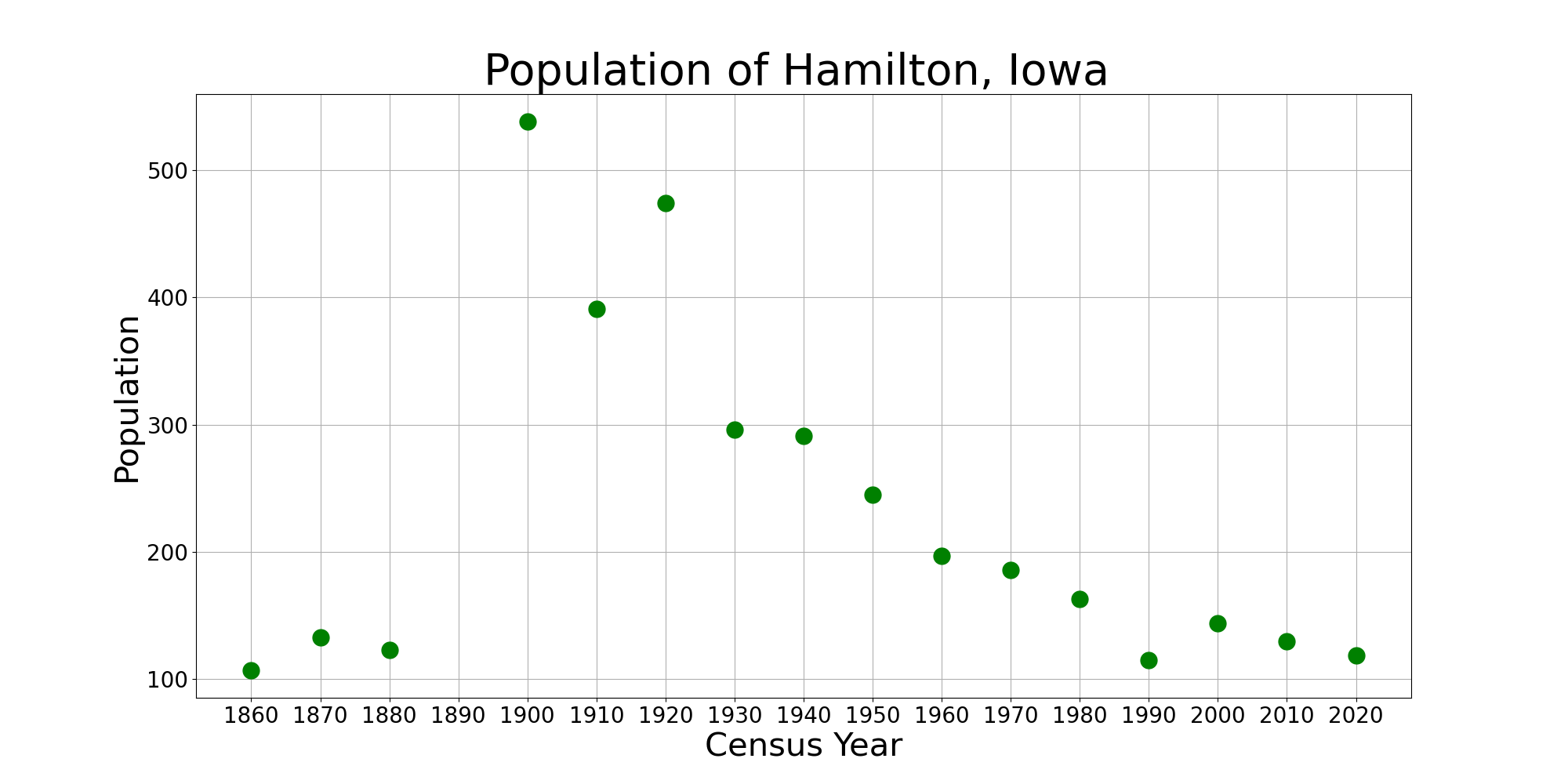
The population of Hamilton, Iowa from US census data

=== 2020 census ===
As of the census of 2020, there were 119 people, 52 households, and 39 families residing in the city. The population density was 235.0 inhabitants per square mile (90.8/km^{2}). There were 56 housing units at an average density of 110.6 per square mile (42.7/km^{2}). The racial makeup of the city was 90.8% White, 0.0% Black or African American, 0.0% Native American, 3.4% Asian, 0.0% Pacific Islander, 0.0% from other races and 5.9% from two or more races. Hispanic or Latino persons of any race comprised 0.0% of the population.

Of the 52 households, 36.5% of which had children under the age of 18 living with them, 51.9% were married couples living together, 9.6% were cohabitating couples, 15.4% had a female householder with no spouse or partner present and 23.1% had a male householder with no spouse or partner present. 25.0% of all households were non-families. 17.3% of all households were made up of individuals, 5.8% had someone living alone who was 65 years old or older.

The median age in the city was 36.3 years. 31.1% of the residents were under the age of 20; 0.8% were between the ages of 20 and 24; 27.7% were from 25 and 44; 31.1% were from 45 and 64; and 9.2% were 65 years of age or older. The gender makeup of the city was 59.7% male and 40.3% female.

=== 2010 census ===
As of the census of 2010, there were 130 people, 49 households, and 36 families living in the city. The population density was 240.7 inhabitants per square mile (92.9/km^{2}). There were 54 housing units at an average density of 100.0 per square mile (38.6/km^{2}). The racial makeup of the city was 100.0% White. Hispanic or Latino of any race were 1.5% of the population.

There were 49 households, of which 38.8% had children under the age of 18 living with them, 40.8% were married couples living together, 22.4% had a female householder with no husband present, 10.2% had a male householder with no wife present, and 26.5% were non-families. 24.5% of all households were made up of individuals, and 12.3% had someone living alone who was 65 years of age or older. The average household size was 2.65 and the average family size was 2.97.

The median age in the city was 39.5 years. 24.6% of residents were under the age of 18; 9.4% were between the ages of 18 and 24; 26.2% were from 25 to 44; 28.4% were from 45 to 64; and 11.5% were 65 years of age or older. The gender makeup of the city was 52.3% male and 47.7% female.

=== 2000 census ===
As of the census of 2000, there were 144 people, 53 households, and 36 families living in the city. The population density was 265.7 inhabitants per square mile (102.6/km^{2}). There were 55 housing units at an average density of 101.5 per square mile (39.2/km^{2}). The racial makeup of the city was 97.92% White, 0.69% African American, 0.69% Native American, and 0.69% from two or more races.

There were 53 households, out of which 32.1% had children under the age of 18 living with them, 54.7% were married couples living together, 9.4% had a female householder with no husband present, and 30.2% were non-families. 28.3% of all households were made up of individuals, and 18.9% had someone living alone who was 65 years of age or older. The average household size was 2.72 and the average family size was 3.38.

In the city, the population was spread out, with 29.2% under the age of 18, 7.6% from 18 to 24, 31.3% from 25 to 44, 18.1% from 45 to 64, and 13.9% who were 65 years of age or older. The median age was 36 years. For every 100 females, there were 114.9 males. For every 100 females age 18 and over, there were 117.0 males.

The median income for a household in the city was $37,083, and the median income for a family was $46,250. Males had a median income of $29,375 versus $30,000 for females. The per capita income for the city was $42,935. There were 5.1% of families and 10.5% of the population living below the poverty line, including 9.1% of under eighteens and 11.1% of those over 64.

== Education ==
The Twin Cedars Community School District operates local public schools.
