= Humeston, Iowa =

- City
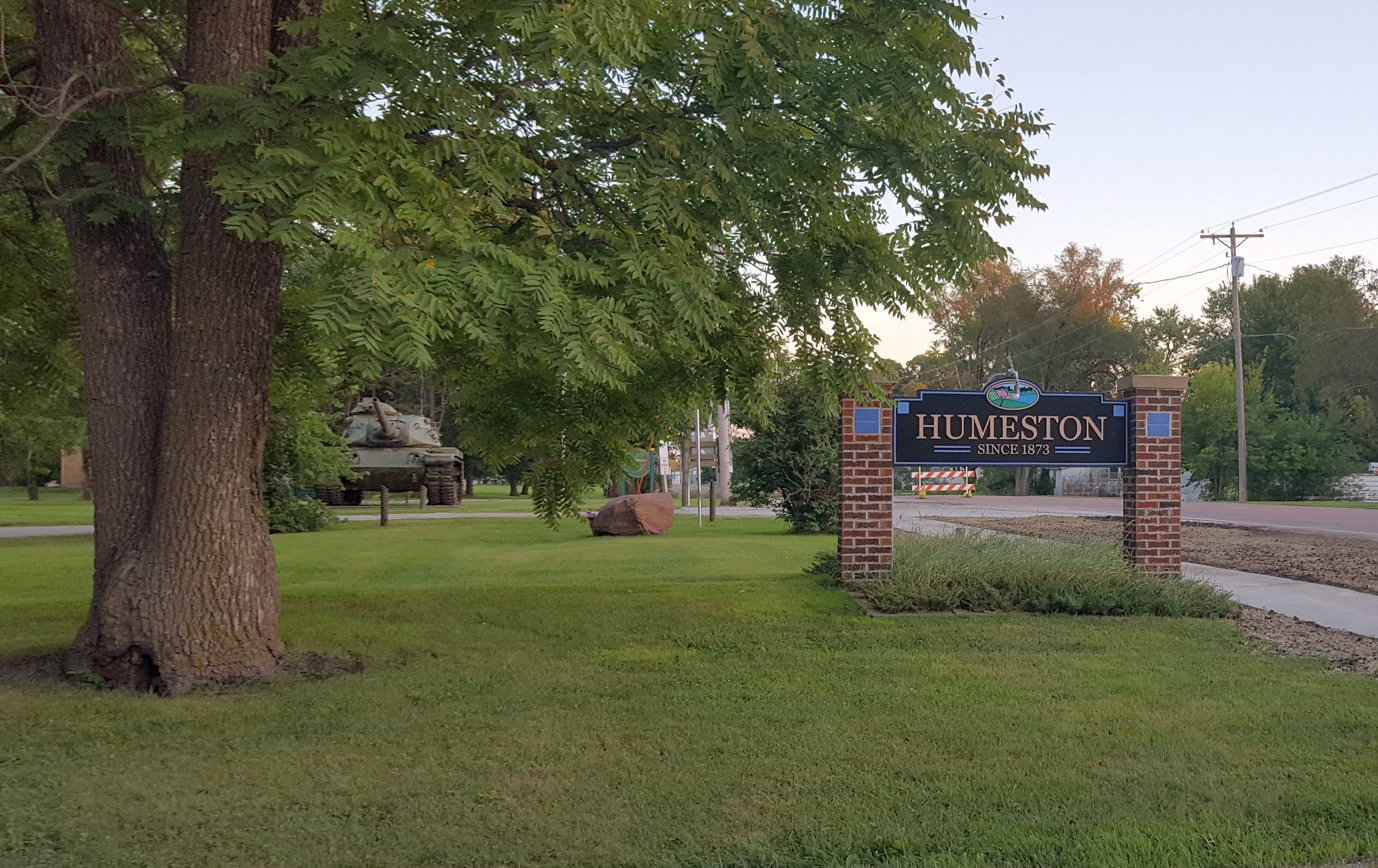
- Humeston welcome sign

- Location of Humeston, Iowa

- Location in the United States
- Coordinates: 40°51′39″N 93°29′58″W
- Country: USA
- State: Iowa
- County: Wayne

Area
  - Total: 0.63 sq mi (1.64 km^{2})
  - Land: 0.63 sq mi (1.62 km^{2})
  - Water: 0.0077 sq mi (0.02 km^{2})
- Elevation: 1,106 ft (337 m)

Population (2020)
  - Total: 465
  - Density: 744.8/sq mi (287.57/km^{2})
- Time zone: UTC-6 (Central (CST))
  - Summer (DST): UTC-5 (CDT)
- ZIP code: 50123
- Area code: 641
- FIPS code: 19-37605
- GNIS feature ID: 2394446
- Website: www.humestoniowa.com

Humeston is a city in Wayne County, Iowa, United States. The population was 465 in the 2020 census, a decline from 542 in 2000.

== Geography ==
According to the United States Census Bureau, the city has a total area of 0.62 square miles (1.61 km^{2}), of which 0.61 square miles (1.58 km^{2}) is land and 0.01 square miles (0.03 km^{2}) is water.

== Demographics ==
Historical population
Census	Pop.	Note	%±
1890	642		—
1900	945		47.2%
1910	1,006		6.5%
1920	1,214		20.7%
1930	924		−23.9%
1940	903		−2.3%
1950	750		−16.9%
1960	638		−14.9%
1970	673		5.5%
1980	671		−0.3%
1990	553		−17.6%
2000	543		−1.8%
2010	494		−9.0%
2020	465		−5.9%
U.S. Decennial Census

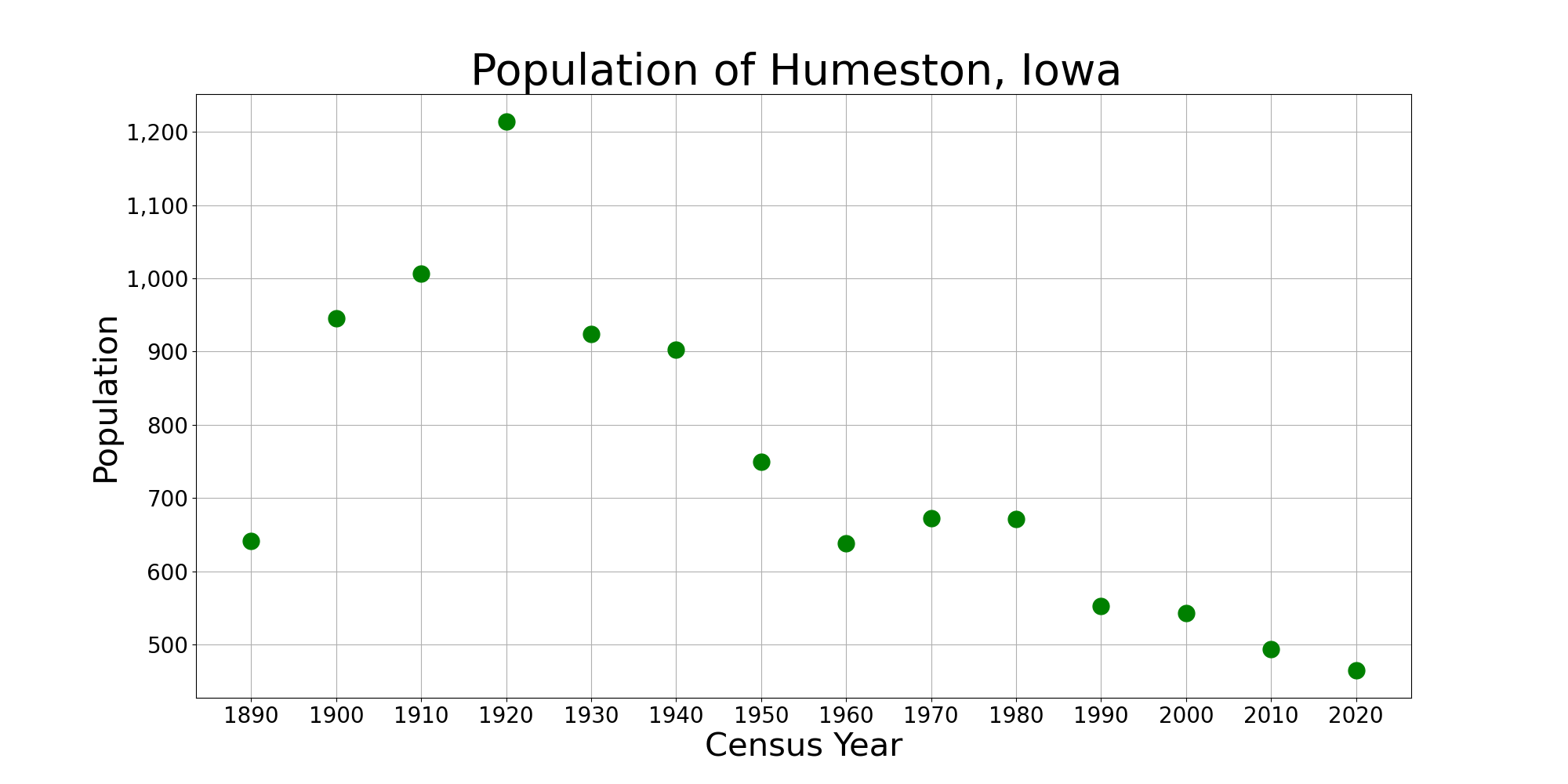
The population of Humeston, Iowa from US census data

=== 2020 census ===
As of the census of 2020, there were 465 people, 237 households, and 127 families residing in the city. The population density was 744.8 inhabitants per square mile (287.6/km^{2}). There were 270 housing units at an average density of 432.5 per square mile (167.0/km^{2}). The racial makeup of the city was 96.1% White, 0.0% Black or African American, 0.2% Native American, 0.0% Asian, 0.0% Pacific Islander, 0.6% from other races and 3.0% from two or more races. Hispanic or Latino persons of any race comprised 1.7% of the population.

Of the 237 households, 20.3% of which had children under the age of 18 living with them, 38.8% were married couples living together, 5.5% were cohabitating couples, 29.5% had a female householder with no spouse or partner present and 26.2% had a male householder with no spouse or partner present. 46.4% of all households were non-families. 40.9% of all households were made up of individuals, 21.1% had someone living alone who was 65 years old or older.

The median age in the city was 51.4 years. 21.3% of the residents were under the age of 20; 4.9% were between the ages of 20 and 24; 19.8% were from 25 and 44; 26.5% were from 45 and 64; and 27.5% were 65 years of age or older. The gender makeup of the city was 48.2% male and 51.8% female.

=== 2010 census ===
As of the census of 2010, there were 494 people, 234 households, and 134 families living in the city. The population density was 809.8 inhabitants per square mile (312.7/km^{2}). There were 294 housing units at an average density of 482 per square mile (186.1/km^{2}). The racial makeup of the city was 97.0% White, 0.2% African American, 0.4% Native American, 0.4% Asian, 0.2% from other races, and 1.8% from two or more races. Hispanic or Latino of any race were 0.6% of the population.

There were 234 households, of which 23.9% had children under the age of 18 living with them, 48.3% were married couples living together, 6.0% had a female householder with no husband present, 3.0% had a male householder with no wife present, and 42.7% were non-families. 40.6% of all households were made up of individuals, and 30.8% had someone living alone who was 65 years of age or older. The average household size was 2.11 and the average family size was 2.89.

The median age in the city was 48.7 years. 21.1% of residents were under the age of 18; 5.9% were between the ages of 18 and 24; 17.7% were from 25 to 44; 27% were from 45 to 64; and 28.5% were 65 years of age or older. The gender makeup of the city was 46.0% male and 54.0% female.

=== 2000 census ===
As of the census of 2000, there were 543 people, 265 households, and 148 families living in the city. The population density was 862.5 inhabitants per square mile (333.0/km^{2}). There were 299 housing units at an average density of 474.9 per square mile (183.4/km^{2}). The racial makeup of the city was 98.53% White, 0.55% Native American, 0.37% Asian, and 0.55% from two or more races. Hispanic or Latino of any race were 1.29% of the population.

There were 265 households, out of which 20.8% had children under the age of 18 living with them, 48.3% were married couples living together, 5.7% had a female householder with no husband present, and 43.8% were non-families. 41.1% of all households were made up of individuals, and 26.4% had someone living alone who was 65 years of age or older. The average household size was 2.05 and the average family size was 2.79.

In the city, the population was spread out, with 20.3% under the age of 18, 5.5% from 18 to 24, 23.9% from 25 to 44, 21.5% from 45 to 64, and 28.7% who were 65 years of age or older. The median age was 46 years. For every 100 females, there were 81.6 males. For every 100 females age 18 and over, there were 82.7 males.

The median income for a household in the city was $22,917, and the median income for a family was $33,214. Males had a median income of $26,563 versus $16,125 for females. The per capita income for the city was $15,617. About 13.9% of families and 21.4% of the population were below the poverty line, including 33.3% of those under age 18 and 17.8% of those age 65 or over.

== Education ==
Mormon Trail Community School District operates schools serving the community.

== Notable people ==
- Jason Dent, retired mixed martial artist
- Chris Street, basketball player at University of Iowa, born in Humeston

== See also ==
- Bluegrass Conference
- Humeston and Shenandoah Railway
- Iowa Highway 2
