= Twin Cedars Community School District =

Public school district in Marion County, Iowa, United States

Coordinates: 41.218026°N 92.926411°W

Location
- Bussey, Iowa Marion and Mahaska counties United States
- Coordinates: 41.218026, -92.926411

District information
- Type: Public
- Grades: K–12
- Superintendent: Brian VanderSluis
- Schools: 2
- Budget: $5,763,000 (2020-21)
- NCES District ID: 1928170

Students and staff
- Students: 358 (2022-23)
- Teachers: 27.00 FTE
- Staff: 43.78 FTE
- Student–teacher ratio: 13.26
- Athletic conference: Bluegrass
- District mascot: Sabers
- Colors: Blue and White

Other information
- Website: www.twincedars.k12.ia.us

The Twin Cedars Community School District is a rural public school district headquartered northwest of Bussey, Iowa.

The district spans eastern Marion County and western Mahaska County. The district serves the towns of Bussey, Hamilton, Marysville, the unincorporated community of Tracy and the surrounding rural areas.

The school's mascot is the Sabers. Their colors are blue and white.

== Schools ==
The district operates two schools on a single campus at 2204 Highway G71 northwest of Bussey:

- Twin Cedars Elementary School
- Twin Cedars Jr-Sr High School

== Twin Cedars High School ==
=== Athletics ===
The Sabers compete in the Bluegrass Conference, including the following sports:

- Volleyball
- Cross Country (boys and girls)
- Football (8-man)
- Basketball (boys and girls)
- Track and Field (boys and girls)
- Baseball
  - 2014 Class 1A State Champions
- Softball

== See also ==
- List of school districts in Iowa
- List of high schools in Iowa
