= Lamoni Community School District =

Public school district in Lamoni, Iowa, United States

Location
- Lamoni, Iowa Decatur County and Ringgold County United States
- Coordinates: 40.62508°N 93.93581°W

District information
- Type: Public
- Grades: K–12
- Superintendent: Chris Coffelt
- Schools: 3
- Budget: $6,079,000 (2020-21)
- NCES District ID: 1916320

Students and staff
- Students: 380 (2022-23)
- Teachers: 26.57 FTE
- Staff: 29.68 FTE
- Student–teacher ratio: 14.30
- Athletic conference: Bluegrass
- District mascot: Demons
- Colors: Black and Red

Other information
- Website: www.lamonischools.org

The Lamoni Community School District is a rural public school district headquartered in Lamoni, Iowa.

It covers sections of Decatur and Ringgold counties. The district serves the city of Lamoni, and surrounding rural areas.

The school's mascot is the Demons. Their colors are black and red.

== Schools ==
The district operates three schools in a single facility at 202 N. Walnut Street in Lamoni.

- Lamoni Elementary School
- Lamoni Middle School
- Lamoni High School

== Lamoni High School ==
=== Athletics ===
The Demons compete in the Bluegrass Conference, including the following sports:

- Volleyball
- Football (8-man)
- Basketball (boys and girls)
- Bowling (boys and girls)
- Track and Field (boys and girls)
  - Boys' - 1952 State Champions
- Golf (boys and girls)
- Baseball
- Softball
- Cross Country (boys and girls)

The students from Lamoni also compete as part of teams from Central Decatur in the Pride of Iowa Conference:

- Wrestling

=== State Champions ===
- Boy's Cross Country: 1 Individual State Title; 1 Individual Mile State Title
- Girl's Golf: 2 Individual State Titles
- Boy's Track: 1-time Outdoor state champs, 1952 (B); 14 Outdoor Event Titles; 4 Indoor Event Titles
- Girl's Track: 3 Outdoor Event Titles; 1 Indoor Event Title
- Wrestling: 1 Individual State Title

== See also ==
- List of school districts in Iowa
- List of high schools in Iowa
