= Orient-Macksburg High School =

Public secondary school in Orient, Iowa, United States

Location
- 201 School Street; Orient, Iowa 50858; United States; 41.1998°N 94.4146°W

Information
- Type: Public
- Superintendent: Clark Wicks
- Principal: Teresa Thompson
- Grades: 7-12
- Enrollment: 54 (2023-2024)
- Colors: Red and white
- Athletics conference: Bluegrass
- Mascot: Bulldog
- Website: www.o-mschools.org

Orient-Macksburg High School was a rural public high school located in Orient, Iowa, United States, part of the Orient-Macksburg Community School District. Their mascot is the Bulldog.

As of June 11, 2024, the School Board voted to dissolve the school district. Reasons cited were low enrollment, staffing issues, and financial shortfalls. Students in the district will attend Nodaway Valley Community School District beginning in fall 2025. In 2026 the district announced that it will demolish the building that housed the high school.

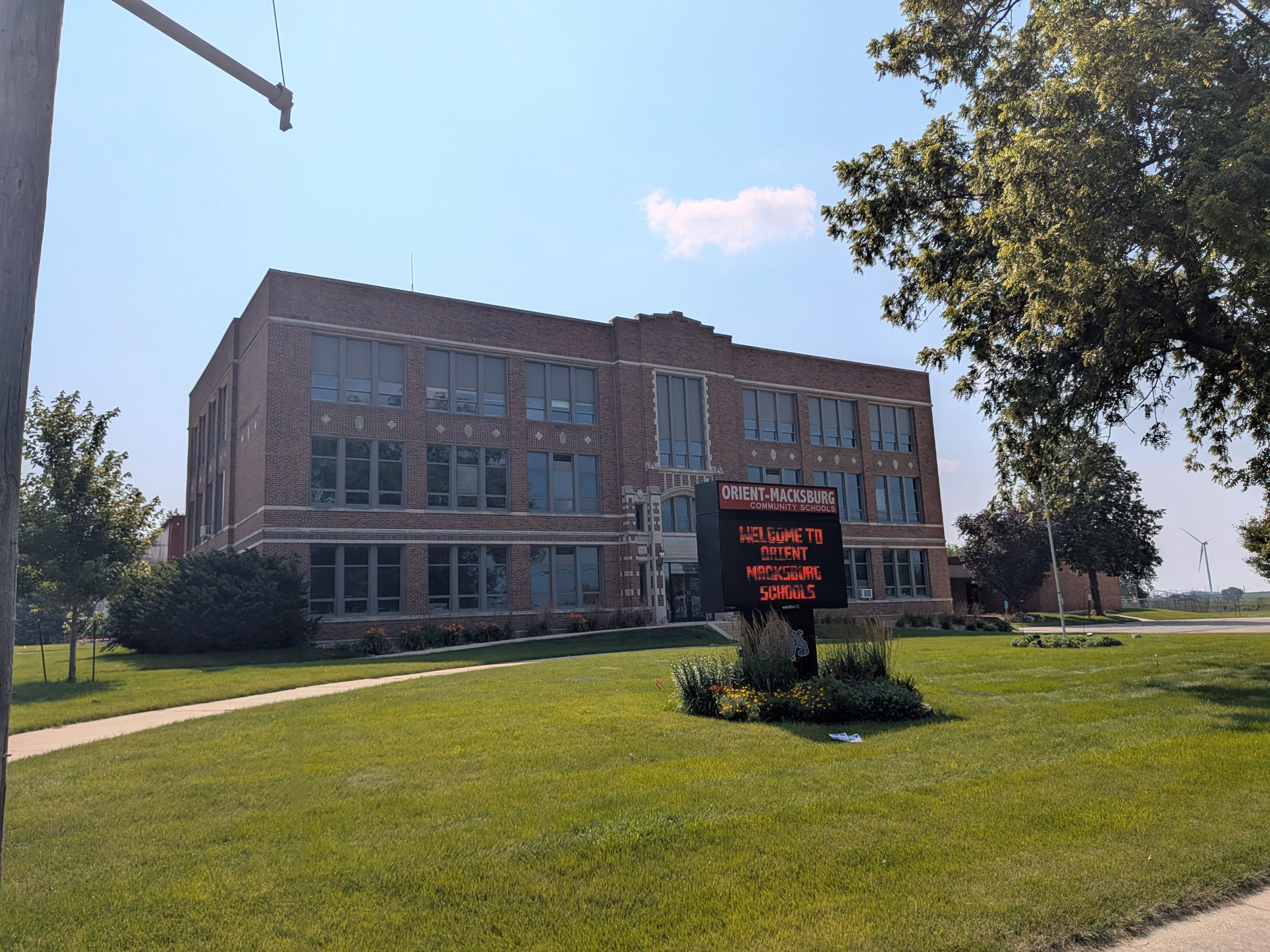
Orient-Macksburg Community School, in Orient

== Athletics ==
The Bulldogs competed in the Bluegrass Conference The students from Orient-Macksburg also played on combined teams with Greenfield as Nodaway Valley-Orient-Macksburg in the Pride of Iowa Conference in several sports.

- Volleyball
- Football (as Nodaway Valley-Orient-Macksburg)
- Cross-Country (boys and girls)
- Basketball (boys and girls)
- Wrestling (as Nodaway Valley-Orient-Macksburg)
  - 2007 Class 2A State Champions
- Track and Field (boys and girls)
- Golf (boys and girls, as Nodaway Valley-Orient-Macksburg)
  - Boys' - 2013 Class 3A State Champions
- Soccer (boys and girls, as Nodaway Valley-Orient-Macksburg)
- Baseball ( as Nodaway Valley-Orient-Macksburg)
- Softball

== See also ==
- List of high schools in Iowa
