= Melcher-Dallas, Iowa =

- City
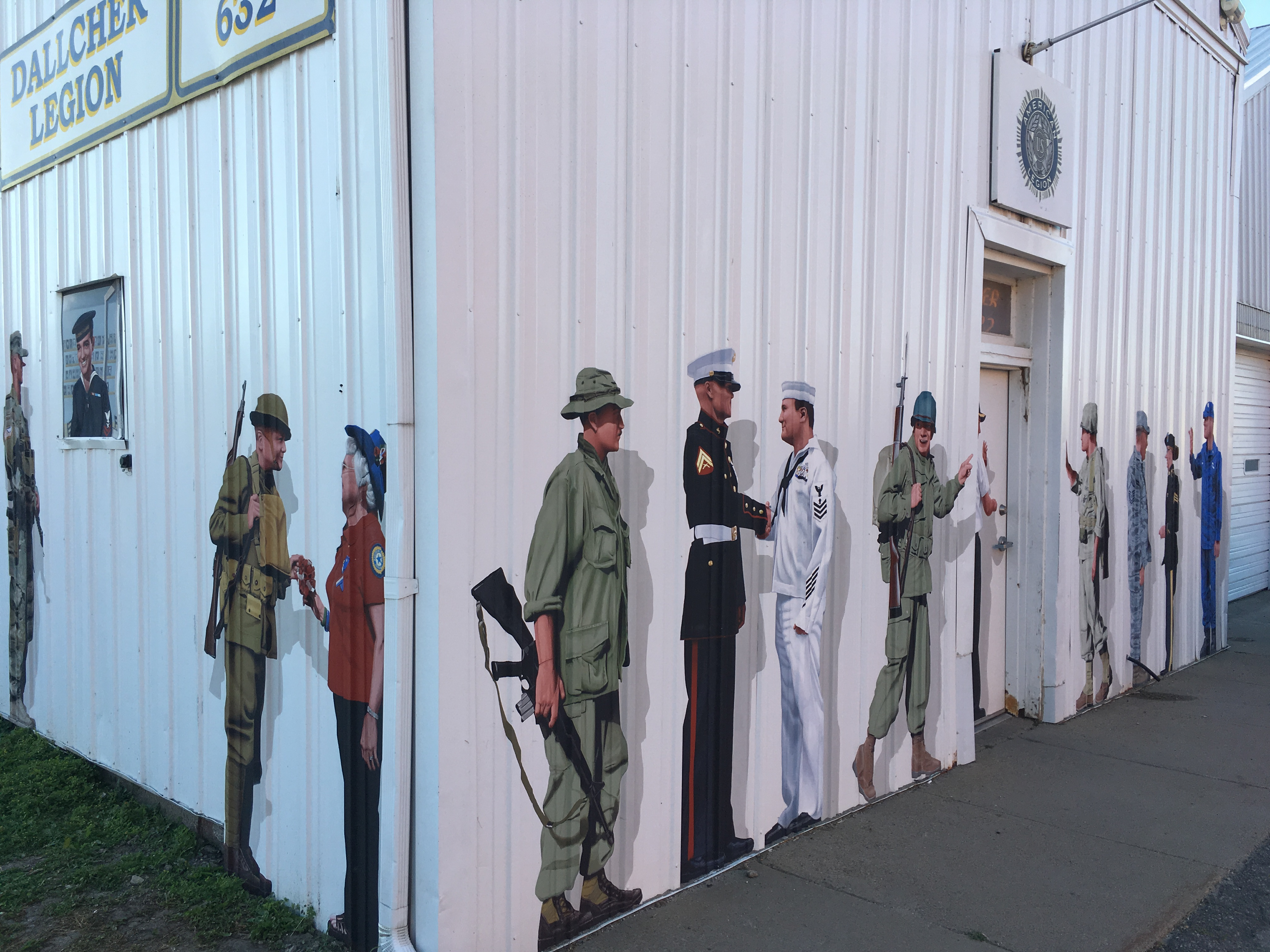
- Main façade of American Legion Post 632

- Location of Melcher-Dallas, Iowa
- Coordinates: 41°13′32″N 93°14′50″W
- Country: US
- State: Iowa
- County: Marion

Area
  - Total: 1.04 sq mi (2.69 km^{2})
  - Land: 1.04 sq mi (2.69 km^{2})
  - Water: 0 sq mi (0.00 km^{2})
- Elevation: 938 ft (286 m)

Population (2020)
  - Total: 1,195
  - Density: 1,149.3/sq mi (443.75/km^{2})
- Time zone: UTC-6 (Central (CST))
  - Summer (DST): UTC-5 (CDT)
- ZIP code: 50163
- Area code: 641
- FIPS code: 19-50935
- GNIS feature ID: 2395087
- Website: http://melcherdallasiowa.org

Melcher-Dallas is a city in Marion County, Iowa, United States. The population was 1,195 at the time of the 2020 census.

== History ==
In 1919, the Red Rock Coal Company's mine near Melcher was the third largest coal mine in the state. This mine produced 187,427 tons of coal that year and employed 345 men. Melcher and Dallas were separate cities until they merged into one city in 1986.

== Geography ==
According to the United States Census Bureau, the city has a total area of 1.00 square mile (2.59 km^{2}), all of it land.

== Demographics ==
Historical populations
Year	Pop.	±%
1940	1,290	—
1950	898	−30.4%
1960	867	−3.5%
1970	879	+1.4%
1980	876	−0.3%
1990	1,302	+48.6%
2000	1,298	−0.3%
2010	1,288	−0.8%
2020	1,195	−7.2%
Source:"U.S. Census website". United States Census Bureau. and Iowa Data Center; Source: U.S. Decennial Census

=== 2020 census ===
As of the 2020 census, there were 1,195 people, 489 households, and 309 families residing in the city. The population density was 1,149.3 inhabitants per square mile (443.8/km^{2}). There were 549 housing units at an average density of 528.0 per square mile (203.9/km^{2}).

The median age in the city was 40.3 years. 24.9% of residents were under the age of 18, and 20.9% were 65 years of age or older. 26.8% of residents were under the age of 20; 5.4% were between the ages of 20 and 24; 22.8% were from 25 to 44; and 24.0% were from 45 to 64. For every 100 females there were 100.2 males, and for every 100 females age 18 and over there were 102.5 males age 18 and over. The gender makeup of the city was 50.0% male and 50.0% female.

0.0% of residents lived in urban areas, while 100.0% lived in rural areas.

There were 489 households, of which 30.7% had children under the age of 18 living in them. Of all households, 46.6% were married-couple households, 7.6% were cohabitating couples, 22.9% were households with a male householder and no spouse or partner present, and 22.9% were households with a female householder and no spouse or partner present. About 36.8% of households were non-families, 31.3% were made up of individuals, and 15.9% had someone living alone who was 65 years of age or older.

Of all housing units, 10.9% were vacant. The homeowner vacancy rate was 2.4% and the rental vacancy rate was 12.9%.

Racial composition as of the 2020 census
Race	Number	Percent
White	1,144	95.7%
Black or African American	7	0.6%
American Indian and Alaska Native	0	0.0%
Asian	1	0.1%
Native Hawaiian and Other Pacific Islander	0	0.0%
Some other race	0	0.0%
Two or more races	43	3.6%
Hispanic or Latino (of any race)	15	1.3%

=== 2010 census ===
As of the census of 2010, there were 1,288 people, 527 households, and 357 families living in the city. The population density was 1,288.0 inhabitants per square mile (497.3/km^{2}). There were 584 housing units at an average density of 584.0 per square mile (225.5/km^{2}). The racial makeup of the city was 97.7% White, 0.2% African American, 0.2% Native American, 1.2% from other races, and 0.7% from two or more races. Hispanic or Latino of any race were 2.1% of the population.

There were 527 households, of which 30.2% had children under the age of 18 living with them, 54.3% were married couples living together, 8.0% had a female householder with no husband present, 5.5% had a male householder with no wife present, and 32.3% were non-families. 28.5% of all households were made up of individuals, and 12.2% had someone living alone who was 65 years of age or older. The average household size was 2.44 and the average family size was 2.99.

The median age in the city was 39.6 years. 24.5% of residents were under the age of 18; 8.5% were between the ages of 18 and 24; 23.8% were from 25 to 44; 25.8% were from 45 to 64; and 17.5% were 65 years of age or older. The gender makeup of the city was 49.6% male and 50.4% female.

=== 2000 census ===
As of the census of 2000, there were 1,298 people, 517 households, and 359 families living in the city. The population density was 1,297.1 inhabitants per square mile (500.8/km^{2}). There were 565 housing units at an average density of 564.6 per square mile (218.0/km^{2}). The racial makeup of the city was 98.69% White, 0.08% African American, 0.08% Native American, 0.39% Asian, 0.08% Pacific Islander, 0.08% from other races, and 0.62% from two or more races. Hispanic or Latino of any race were 0.23% of the population.

There were 517 households, out of which 32.9% had children under the age of 18 living with them, 55.7% were married couples living together, 9.5% had a female householder with no husband present, and 30.4% were non-families. 26.9% of all households were made up of individuals, and 16.2% had someone living alone who was 65 years of age or older. The average household size was 2.51 and the average family size was 3.06.

In the city, the population was spread out, with 28.0% under the age of 18, 6.8% from 18 to 24, 24.7% from 25 to 44, 22.6% from 45 to 64, and 18.0% who were 65 years of age or older. The median age was 38 years. For every 100 females, there were 97.0 males. For every 100 females age 18 and over, there were 93.6 males.

The median income for a household in the city was $36,207, and the median income for a family was $42,167. Males had a median income of $32,788 versus $22,500 for females. The per capita income for the city was $15,600. About 6.1% of families and 8.2% of the population were below the poverty line, including 11.2% of those under age 18 and 9.8% of those age 65 or over.

== Education ==
The Melcher-Dallas Community School District operates local public schools.
