= Lamoni, Iowa =

- City
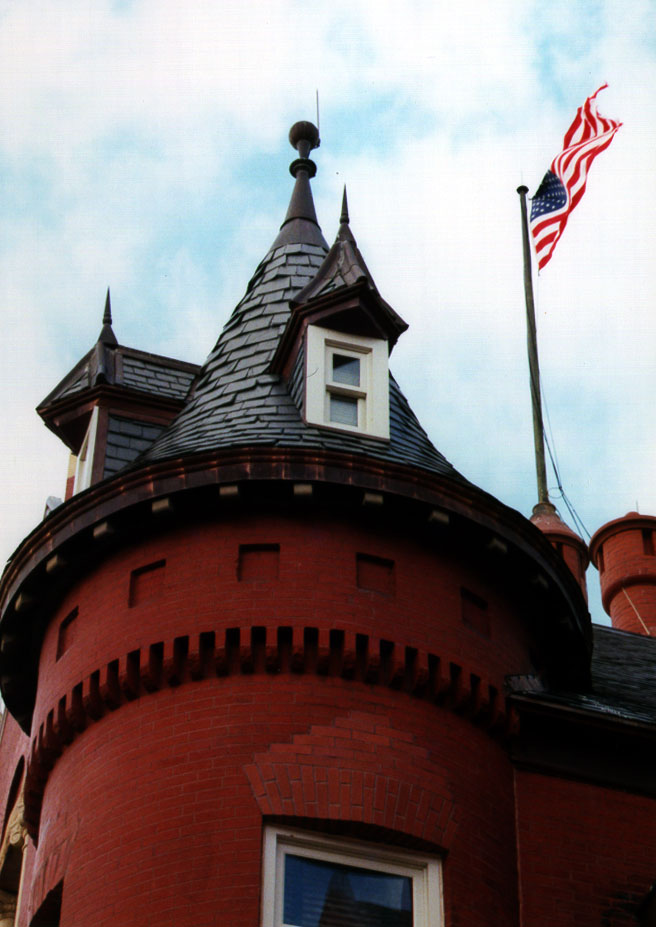
- Graceland University Administration Building

- Location of Lamoni, Iowa

- Location in the United States
- Coordinates: 40°37′22″N 93°56′03″W
- Country: United States
- State: Iowa
- County: Decatur

Government
  - Mayor: Douglas L. Foster

Area
  - Total: 4.05 sq mi (10.49 km^{2})
  - Land: 3.95 sq mi (10.24 km^{2})
  - Water: 0.097 sq mi (0.25 km^{2})
- Elevation: 1,102 ft (336 m)

Population (2020)
  - Total: 1,969
  - Density: 498.2/sq mi (192.37/km^{2})
- Time zone: UTC-6 (Central (CST))
  - Summer (DST): UTC-5 (CDT)
- ZIP code: 50140
- Area code: 641
- FIPS code: 19-42960
- GNIS feature ID: 468191
- Website: www.leadonlamoni.com

Lamoni is a city in Decatur County, Iowa, United States. The population was 1,969 at the time of the 2020 Census. Lamoni is the home of Graceland University, affiliated with the Community of Christ, a denomination of the Latter Day Saint movement. The city was the church's headquarters from 1880 to 1920, after which it moved to Independence, Missouri.

The town is host to KNSL, a public radio station which rebroadcasts programming from Iowa Public Radio, National Public Radio, and adult album alternative music to South Central Iowa and North Central Missouri.

== History ==
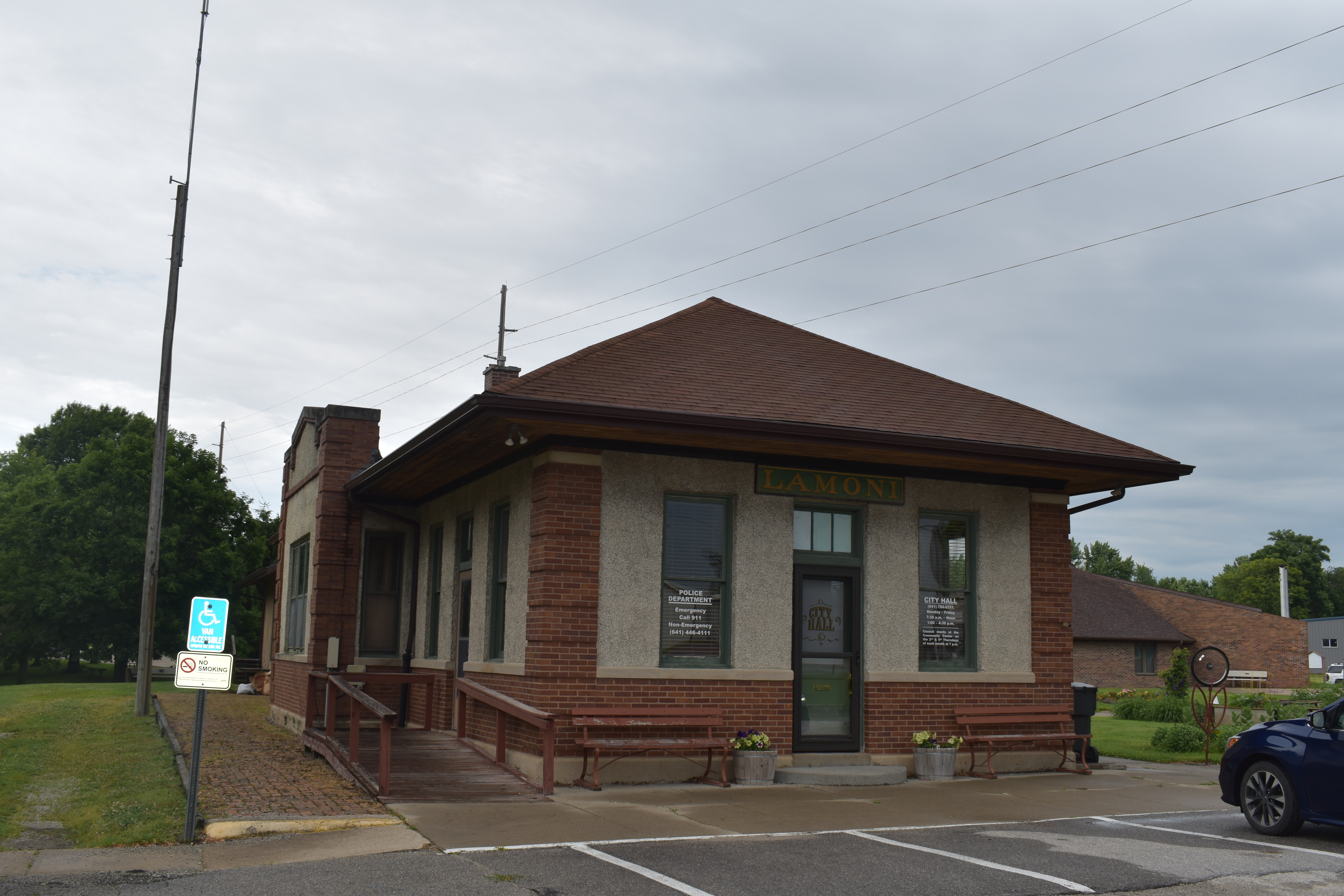
Chicago, Burlington, and Quincy station in Lamoni

The Lamoni area was first settled in 1834 to 1840 by people who thought they were settling in slave-owning Missouri. It was only after the Sullivan Line separating Missouri and Iowa was formally surveyed when Iowa became a state in 1846 that they realized they were in non-slave-owning Iowa.

In 1851, freedom-seeking refugees from the Hungarian Revolution of 1848 sought to settle the area and form the community of New Buda (named for a neighborhood of Budapest). Their efforts did not result in a significant settlement.

In 1870, Joseph Smith III authorized the Order of Enoch to purchase over 3,000 acres (12 km^{2}) to form a community of the Reorganized Church of Jesus Christ of Latter Day Saints (RLDS Church). Smith lived in Liberty Hall, now a museum.

The city was named after Lamoni, a king mentioned in the Book of Mormon.

Lamoni was sited just north of the Missouri border on good farmland in the northeast quadrant of Fayette Township, Decatur County, Iowa, because it is about 100 miles north of Temple Lot, an important location in church teachings. The Mormons had been evicted from Temple Lot and Missouri in the 1838 Mormon War. Members of the Church of Jesus Christ of Latter-day Saints, led by Brigham Young, had passed through the land in 1846, staying at nearby Garden Grove, Iowa, while en route from Nauvoo, Illinois (where they had settled after being forced to leave Missouri), to the Salt Lake Valley.

Lamoni was formally platted adjacent to newly laid tracks of the Chicago, Burlington and Quincy Railroad in 1879. In 1880, Smith moved to Lamoni (as did the RLDS Church headquarters) from Plano, Illinois. In 1895, the church founded Graceland University in Lamoni. By 1900, the population of Lamoni had grown to 1,500.

After the Smith family moved to Independence to the area near Temple Lot in 1916, Liberty Hall served as a home for the aged, a farmhouse, a Civilian Conservation Corps (CCC) camp, and a private residence before becoming a museum.

Charles Hyde and David Vredenburg, members of the church affiliated with the church-owned General Supply Company, which owned Lamoni mills, hardware and grocery stores, started a grocery store chain called the Supply Store in 1930, which in turn became Hy-Vee (from their two names). Lamoni remained the company's headquarters until 1945, when it moved to Chariton, Iowa.

== Geography ==
Lamoni is located in southwest Decatur County on US Route 69.

According to the United States Census Bureau, the city has an area of 3.44 square miles (8.91 km^{2}), of which 3.34 square miles (8.65 km^{2}) is land and 0.10 square miles (0.26 km^{2}) is water.

=== Climate ===
Lamoni has a humid continental climate (Köppen climate classification Dfa).

Climate data for Lamoni, Iowa (1991–2020 normals, extremes 1897–present)
| Month | Jan | Feb | Mar | Apr | May | Jun | Jul | Aug | Sep | Oct | Nov | Dec | Year |
|---|---|---|---|---|---|---|---|---|---|---|---|---|---|
| Record high °F (°C) | 70 (21) | 79 (26) | 86 (30) | 91 (33) | 102 (39) | 111 (44) | 110 (43) | 113 (45) | 103 (39) | 94 (34) | 81 (27) | 70 (21) | 113 (45) |
| Mean daily maximum °F (°C) | 33.1 (0.6) | 38.2 (3.4) | 50.8 (10.4) | 63.0 (17.2) | 73.1 (22.8) | 83.0 (28.3) | 87.2 (30.7) | 85.6 (29.8) | 78.4 (25.8) | 65.2 (18.4) | 50.4 (10.2) | 38.1 (3.4) | 62.2 (16.8) |
| Daily mean °F (°C) | 23.5 (−4.7) | 27.9 (−2.3) | 39.8 (4.3) | 51.2 (10.7) | 62.5 (16.9) | 72.6 (22.6) | 76.7 (24.8) | 74.8 (23.8) | 66.6 (19.2) | 53.8 (12.1) | 40.1 (4.5) | 28.9 (−1.7) | 51.5 (10.8) |
| Mean daily minimum °F (°C) | 13.9 (−10.1) | 17.6 (−8.0) | 28.8 (−1.8) | 39.5 (4.2) | 51.9 (11.1) | 62.2 (16.8) | 66.2 (19.0) | 64.1 (17.8) | 54.8 (12.7) | 42.4 (5.8) | 29.7 (−1.3) | 19.7 (−6.8) | 40.9 (4.9) |
| Record low °F (°C) | −29 (−34) | −24 (−31) | −12 (−24) | 7 (−14) | 25 (−4) | 38 (3) | 46 (8) | 40 (4) | 24 (−4) | −1 (−18) | −11 (−24) | −27 (−33) | −29 (−34) |
| Average precipitation inches (mm) | 1.12 (28) | 1.65 (42) | 2.50 (64) | 4.25 (108) | 5.86 (149) | 5.41 (137) | 4.80 (122) | 4.52 (115) | 3.78 (96) | 3.27 (83) | 2.25 (57) | 1.62 (41) | 41.03 (1,042) |
| Average snowfall inches (cm) | 7.3 (19) | 6.3 (16) | 4.7 (12) | 1.3 (3.3) | 0.0 (0.0) | 0.0 (0.0) | 0.0 (0.0) | 0.0 (0.0) | 0.0 (0.0) | 0.3 (0.76) | 1.9 (4.8) | 4.9 (12) | 26.7 (68) |
| Average precipitation days (≥ 0.01 in) | 6.6 | 6.9 | 9.3 | 11.8 | 13.5 | 11.5 | 10.1 | 9.8 | 8.3 | 9.3 | 6.9 | 6.4 | 110.4 |
| Average snowy days (≥ 0.1 in) | 3.5 | 3.8 | 1.6 | 0.4 | 0.0 | 0.0 | 0.0 | 0.0 | 0.0 | 0.2 | 0.8 | 2.9 | 13.2 |
Source: NOAA

== Demographics ==
Historical populations
| Year | Pop. | ±% |
|---|---|---|
| 1900 | 1,540 | — |
| 1910 | 1,541 | +0.1% |
| 1920 | 1,787 | +16.0% |
| 1930 | 1,739 | −2.7% |
| 1940 | 1,567 | −9.9% |
| 1950 | 2,196 | +40.1% |
| 1960 | 2,173 | −1.0% |
| 1970 | 2,540 | +16.9% |
| 1980 | 2,705 | +6.5% |
| 1990 | 2,319 | −14.3% |
| 2000 | 2,444 | +5.4% |
| 2010 | 2,324 | −4.9% |
| 2020 | 1,969 | −15.3% |
Source:"U.S. Census website". United States Census Bureau. and Iowa Data Center; Source: U.S. Decennial Census

=== Amish population ===
The Lamoni area has a sizable Amish community, whose businesses are not open on Sundays.

=== 2020 census ===
As of the 2020 census, there were 1,969 people, 719 households, and 402 families residing in the city. The population density was 498.2 inhabitants per square mile (192.4/km^{2}). There were 904 housing units at an average density of 228.7 per square mile (88.3/km^{2}).

The median age was 29.9 years. 29.4% of residents were under the age of 20; 16.1% were between the ages of 20 and 24; 18.6% were from 25 to 44; 18.2% were from 45 to 64; and 17.7% were 65 years of age or older. 18.0% of residents were under the age of 18. The gender makeup of the city was 48.3% male and 51.7% female. For every 100 females there were 93.4 males, and for every 100 females age 18 and over there were 92.0 males age 18 and over.

Of the 719 households, 26.3% had children under the age of 18 living with them, 41.0% were married couples living together, 4.5% were cohabitating couples, 31.3% had a female householder with no spouse or partner present, and 23.2% had a male householder with no spouse or partner present. 44.1% of all households were non-families. 38.2% of all households were made up of individuals, and 16.4% had someone living alone who was 65 years old or older.

There were 904 housing units, of which 20.5% were vacant. The homeowner vacancy rate was 4.2% and the rental vacancy rate was 17.7%.

0.0% of residents lived in urban areas, while 100.0% lived in rural areas.

Racial composition as of the 2020 census
| Race | Number | Percent |
|---|---|---|
| White | 1,660 | 84.3% |
| Black or African American | 82 | 4.2% |
| American Indian and Alaska Native | 14 | 0.7% |
| Asian | 28 | 1.4% |
| Native Hawaiian and Other Pacific Islander | 19 | 1.0% |
| Some other race | 60 | 3.0% |
| Two or more races | 106 | 5.4% |
| Hispanic or Latino (of any race) | 143 | 7.3% |

=== 2010 census ===
As of the census of 2010, there were 2,324 people, 770 households, and 427 families living in the city. The population density was 723.6 inhabitants per square mile (279.4/km^{2}). There were 927 housing units at an average density of 288.7 per square mile (111.5/km^{2}). The racial makeup of the city was 88.6% White, 5.7% African American, 0.6% Native American, 1.1% Asian, 0.7% Pacific Islander, 1.1% from other races, and 2.0% from two or more races. Hispanic or Latino of any race were 4.5% of the population.

There were 770 households, of which 24% had children under the age of 18 living with them, 42.7% were married couples living together, 9.2% had a female householder with no husband present, and 44.5% were non-families. 32.3% of all households were made up of individuals, and 13.6% had someone living alone who was 65 years of age or older. The average household size was 2.25 and the average family size was 2.84.

27.8% were under the age of 20, 25.6% from 20 to 24, 11.9% from 25 to 44, 15.8% from 45 to 64, and 15.5% were 65 years of age or older. The median age was 23.5 years. For every 100 females, there were 98.6 males. For every 100 females age 18 and over, there were 96.9 males.

=== 2000 census ===
As of the census of 2000, there were 2,444 people, 818 households, and 428 families living in the city. The population density was 761.1 inhabitants per square mile (293.9/km^{2}). There were 904 housing units at an average density of 281.5 per square mile (108.7/km^{2}). The racial makeup of the city was 91.86% White, 2.95% African American, 0.16% Native American, 1.60% Asian, 0.41% Pacific Islander, 0.82% from other races, and 2.21% from two or more races. Hispanic or Latino of any race were 2.78% of the population.

There were 818 households, out of which 21.4% had children under the age of 18 living with them, 44.7% were married couples living together, 5.9% had a female householder with no husband present, and 47.6% were non-families. 36.7% of all households were made up of individuals, and 16.5% had someone living alone who was 65 years of age or older. The average household size was 2.14 and the average family size was 2.84.

15.1% were under the age of 18, 39.6% from 18 to 24, 13.9% from 25 to 44, 15.6% from 45 to 64, and 15.8% were 65 years of age or older. The median age was 23. For every 100 females, there were 93.2 males. For every 100 females age 18 and over, there were 92.2 males.

The median income for a household in the city was $42,083, and the median income for a family was $53,363. Males had a median income of $37,700 versus $26,563 for females. The per capita income for the city was $14,279. About 6.9% of families and 15.3% of the population were below the poverty line, including 7.2% of those under age 18 and 9.2% of those age 65 or over.

== Education ==
The Lamoni Community School District operates local public schools.

Graceland University is a private university located in Lamoni.

== Transportation ==
Jefferson Lines provides intercity bus service to Lamoni on a route between Minneapolis and Tulsa.

== Notable people ==
- Paul Ballantyne, actor
- William W. Blair, RLDS Church leader
- Eveline Burgess, chess champion
- Steven V. Carter, politician
- David Dancer, politician
- Caitlyn Jenner, athlete and television personality
- Floyd M. McDowell, RLDS Church leader
- Jack Parker, athlete
- Alexander Hale Smith, RLDS Church leader
- Heman C. Smith, RLDS Church leader
- Israel A. Smith, RLDS Church leader
- Joseph Smith III, RLDS Church leader
- W. Wallace Smith, RLDS Church leader
- Wallace B. Smith, RLDS Church leader
- Eddie Watt, Major League Baseball pitcher
