= Bussey, Iowa =

- City
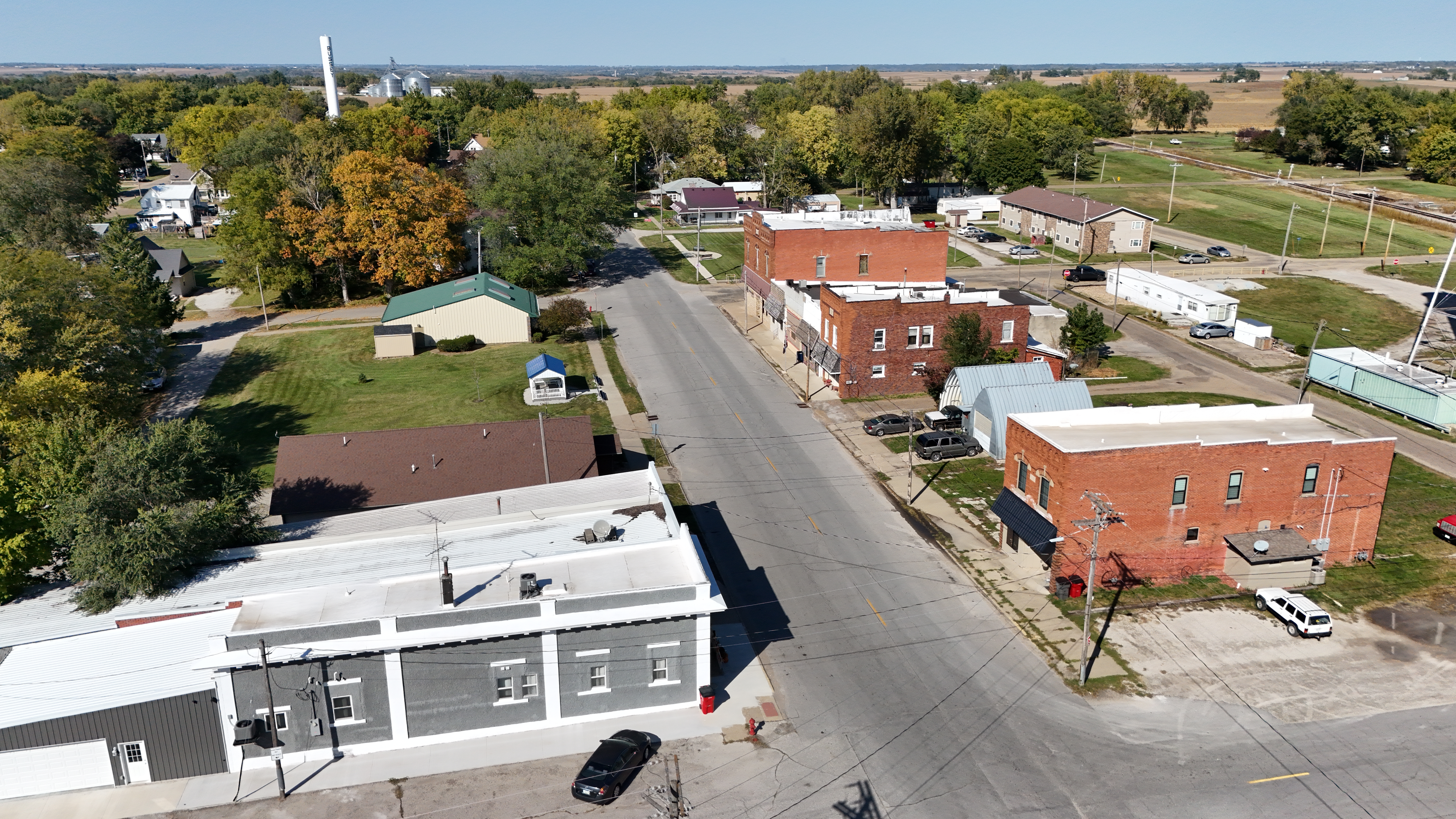
- Merrill Street in Bussey

- Location of Bussey, Iowa
- Coordinates: 41°12′20″N 92°53′03″W
- Country: United States
- State: Iowa
- County: Marion

Area
  - Total: 0.31 sq mi (0.81 km^{2})
  - Land: 0.31 sq mi (0.81 km^{2})
  - Water: 0 sq mi (0.00 km^{2})
- Elevation: 869 ft (265 m)

Population (2020)
  - Total: 387
  - Density: 1,244.3/sq mi (480.42/km^{2})
- Time zone: UTC-6 (Central (CST))
  - Summer (DST): UTC-5 (CDT)
- ZIP code: 50044
- Area code: 641
- FIPS code: 19-09730
- GNIS feature ID: 2393481

Bussey is a city in southeast Marion County, Iowa, United States. The population was 387 at the time of the 2020 census.

== Geography ==
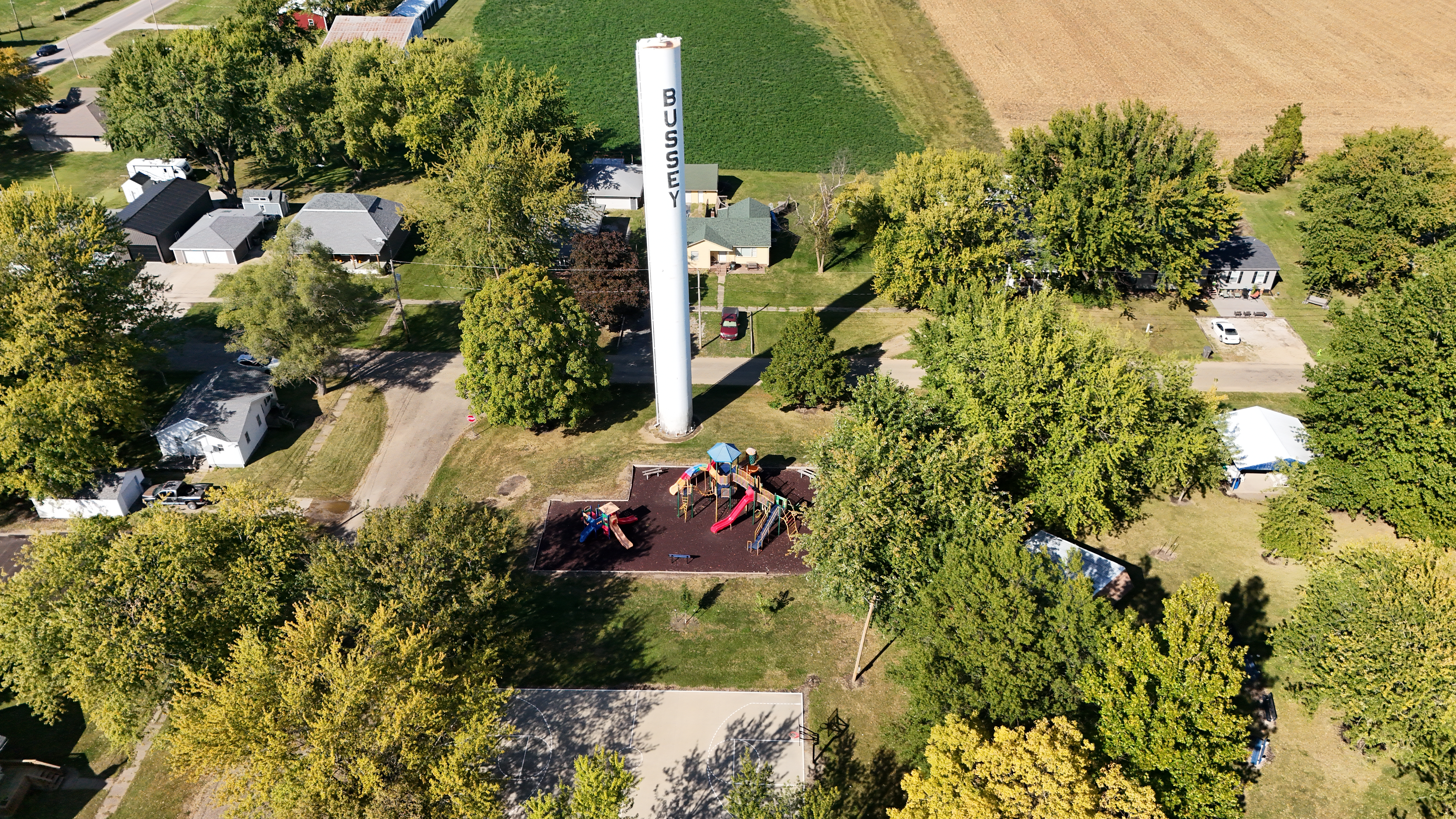
A city park in Bussey

Bussey is located at the intersection of routes G71 and T23. It is three quarter mile west of the Marion-Mahaska county line and two miles north of the Marion-Monroe county line. North Coal Creek flows past the community and on to its confluence with the Des Moines River seven miles to the northeast. Knoxville is approximately 14 miles to the northwest and Oskaloosa is approximately 13 miles to the northeast in Mahaska County.

According to the United States Census Bureau, the city has a total area of 0.33 square miles (0.85 km^{2}), all of it land.

== History ==
Jesse Bussey, originally from Greene County, Pennsylvania, bought the land for the town of Bussey in 1867. He laid out the town of Bussey on the line of the Albia, Knoxville and Des Moines Railroad in 1875, the same year the line was acquired by the Chicago, Burlington and Quincy Railroad. Mr. Bussey went into the lumber and grain business there. By 1880, the population was close to 100, with four general merchandise stores and one drug store. The town was incorporated in 1895. There were some problems with the initial incorporation, so a second vote was held in 1899, after which James Bussey was elected as the first mayor.

In the late 19th and early 20th centuries, there were numerous coal mines in the Bussey area. In the early 1890s, the Powers company had two mine shafts in the area with a private tramway connecting them to the company's tipple along the railroad line. J. A. Powers founded the O.K. Coal Company in Bussey, with a mile-long railroad spur to a mine a mile south of town. This mine was the largest producer in Marion County from 1895 to around 1902. Powers reorganized the O.K. company as the Mammoth Vein Coal Company when it moved its primary operations to Everist, a coal camp 3 miles west of Bussey and a mile north of Marysville. The Cricket Coal Company, later the Equality Coal Company, was based in Bussey and had a shaft outside of town, producing 18,000 tons of coal in 1915 from a coal seam that was 4 to 6 feet thick.

United Mine Workers local 69 was organized in Bussey in 1899. In 1902, it had 275 members, but by 1907 most of the local mining activity had moved to Everist, and it had only 8 members. Prior to union organization, the minimum wage was $1.50 per day, but by 1902, this had increased to $2.15 per day. By 1907, wages ranged from $1.90 to $2.70 per day. A second union local, UMW local 2482, had 216 members in Bussey in 1912.

== Demographics ==
Historical populations
Year	Pop.	±%
1900	550	—
1910	669	+21.6%
1920	585	−12.6%
1930	546	−6.7%
1940	632	+15.8%
1950	633	+0.2%
1960	557	−12.0%
1970	498	−10.6%
1980	579	+16.3%
1990	494	−14.7%
2000	450	−8.9%
2010	422	−6.2%
2020	387	−8.3%
Source:"U.S. Census website". United States Census Bureau. and Iowa Data Center; Source: U.S. Decennial Census

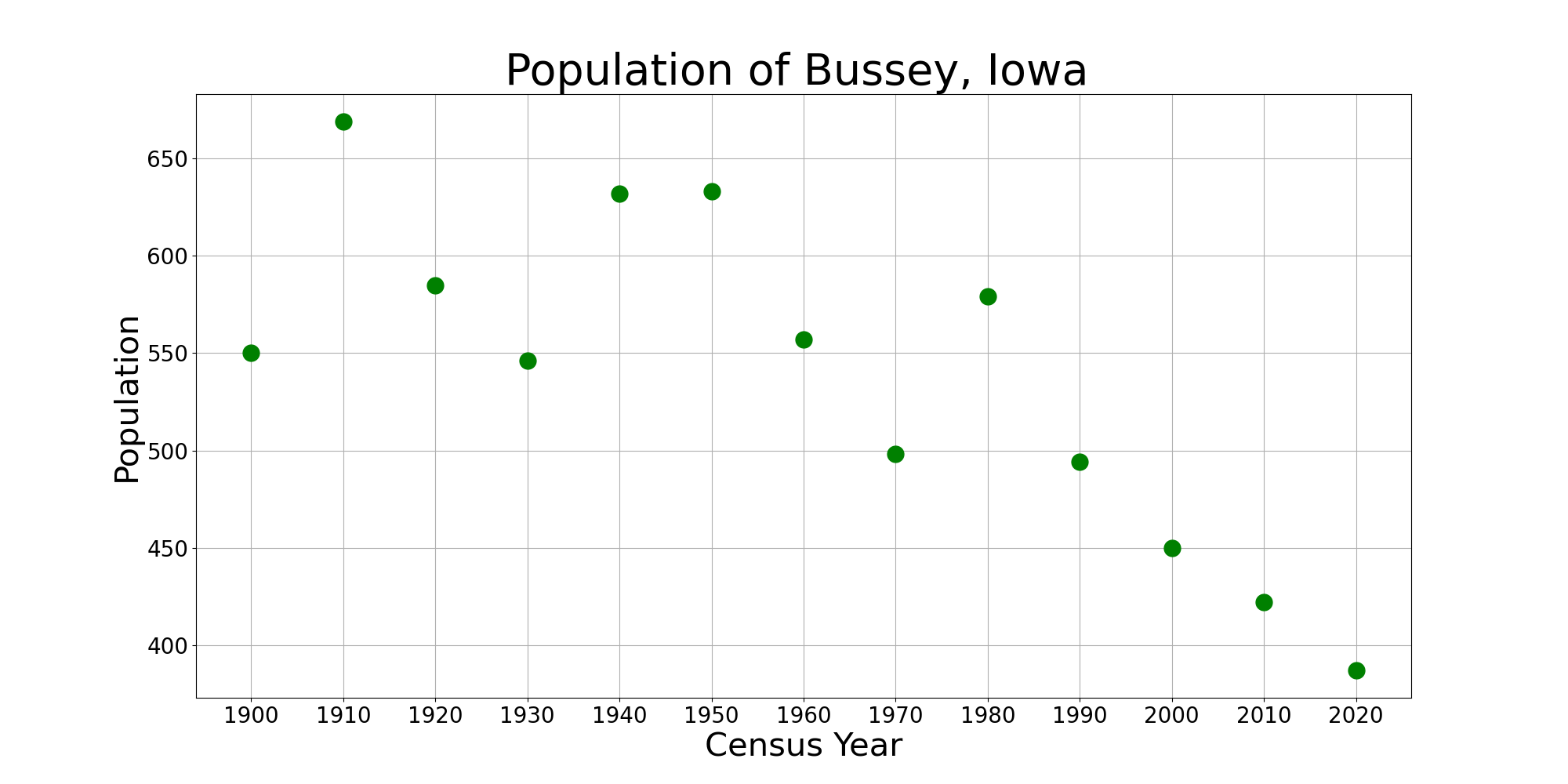
The population of Bussey, Iowa from US census data

=== 2020 census ===
As of the census of 2020, there were 387 people, 164 households, and 113 families residing in the city. The population density was 1,244.3 inhabitants per square mile (480.4/km^{2}). There were 185 housing units at an average density of 594.8 per square mile (229.7/km^{2}). The racial makeup of the city was 92.5% White, 0.5% Black or African American, 0.5% Native American, 1.6% Asian, 0.0% Pacific Islander, 1.3% from other races and 3.6% from two or more races. Hispanic or Latino persons of any race comprised 3.6% of the population.

Of the 164 households, 28.7% of which had children under the age of 18 living with them, 48.8% were married couples living together, 7.3% were cohabitating couples, 23.8% had a female householder with no spouse or partner present and 20.1% had a male householder with no spouse or partner present. 31.1% of all households were non-families. 23.8% of all households were made up of individuals, 12.2% had someone living alone who was 65 years old or older.

The median age in the city was 43.7 years. 24.8% of the residents were under the age of 20; 4.7% were between the ages of 20 and 24; 22.0% were from 25 and 44; 26.4% were from 45 and 64; and 22.2% were 65 years of age or older. The gender makeup of the city was 48.8% male and 51.2% female.

=== 2010 census ===
As of the census of 2010, there were 422 people, 176 households, and 116 families residing in the city. The population density was 1,278.8 inhabitants per square mile (493.7/km^{2}). There were 209 housing units at an average density of 633.3 per square mile (244.5/km^{2}). The racial makeup of the city was 98.3% White, 0.7% Native American, 0.2% Asian, and 0.7% from two or more races. Hispanic or Latino of any race were 2.1% of the population.

There were 176 households, of which 33.0% had children under the age of 18 living with them, 47.2% were married couples living together, 11.4% had a female householder with no husband present, 7.4% had a male householder with no wife present, and 34.1% were non-families. 29.5% of all households were made up of individuals, and 12.5% had someone living alone who was 65 years of age or older. The average household size was 2.40 and the average family size was 2.92.

The median age in the city was 40.7 years. 26.8% of residents were under the age of 18; 6.9% were between the ages of 18 and 24; 21.6% were from 25 to 44; 28.3% were from 45 to 64; and 16.6% were 65 years of age or older. The gender makeup of the city was 49.3% male and 50.7% female.

=== 2000 census ===
As of the census of 2000, there were 450 people, 184 households, and 128 families residing in the city. The population density was 1,358.1 inhabitants per square mile (524.4/km^{2}). There were 210 housing units at an average density of 633.8 per square mile (244.7/km^{2}). The racial makeup of the city was 97.78% White, 0.22% Native American, 0.44% Asian, and 1.56% from two or more races. Hispanic or Latino of any race were 0.22% of the population.

There were 184 households, out of which 28.8% had children under the age of 18 living with them, 52.2% were married couples living together, 8.7% had a female householder with no husband present, and 29.9% were non-families. 29.3% of all households were made up of individuals, and 14.7% had someone living alone who was 65 years of age or older. The average household size was 2.45 and the average family size was 2.95.

In the city, the population was spread out, with 25.6% under the age of 18, 9.1% from 18 to 24, 22.9% from 25 to 44, 23.8% from 45 to 64, and 18.7% who were 65 years of age or older. The median age was 39 years. For every 100 females, there were 107.4 males. For every 100 females age 18 and over, there were 99.4 males.

The median income for a household in the city was $32,500, and the median income for a family was $42,857. Males had a median income of $35,500 versus $23,438 for females. The per capita income for the city was $14,657. About 7.5% of families and 12.6% of the population were below the poverty line, including 12.5% of those under age 18 and 16.2% of those age 65 or over.

== Education ==
The Twin Cedars Community School District operates local public schools.

== Notable people ==
- Kenneth Veenstra (born 1939), politician
