= Walter Osborn =

American politician (1878–1949)

Isaac Walter Osborn (30 March 1878 – 12 March 1949) was an American politician in Iowa.

Osborn was born on 30 March 1878 and raised on a farm near Davis City, Iowa. Shortly after completing his education in the Davis City schools, Osborn married Nelle Mae Jackson on 2 November 1898. Osborn worked as a rural schoolteacher and was a Boy Scouts of America leader for six years before pursuing his first public office.

Osborn served twelve years as township assessor and moved to Leon in 1914, upon his election as Decatur County auditor. After two terms as county auditor, Osborn became the county's inaugural agricultural agent for twelve years. He was also a member of the school board, serving as board secretary for eight years before his election as board president in 1928. Osborn won consecutive terms on the Iowa House of Representatives in 1930 and 1932, as a Democratic Party legislator for District 6. Osborn died at home in Leon on 12 March 1949.
