= Garden Grove, Iowa =

- City
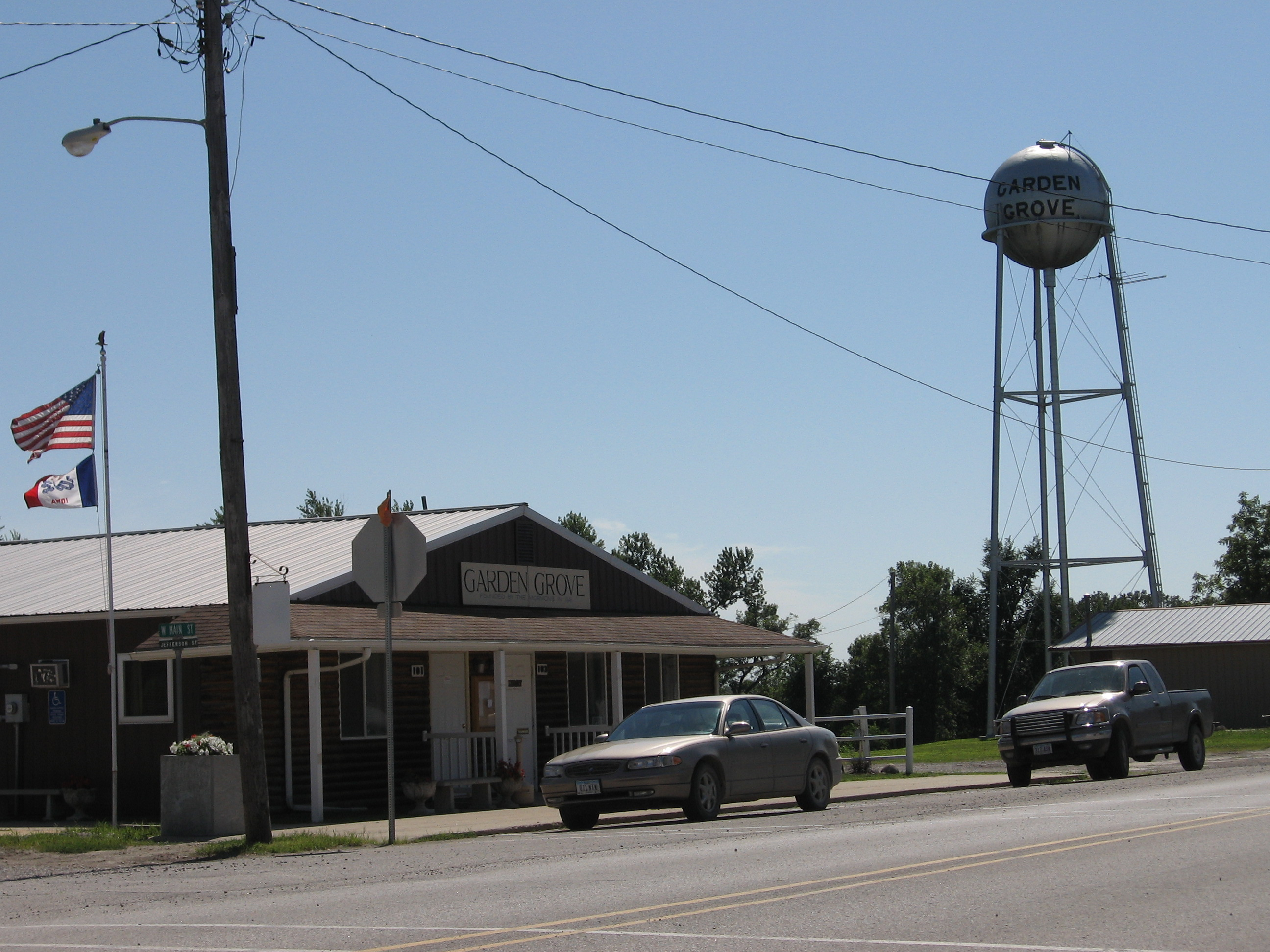
- Garden Grove town center

- Location of Garden Grove, Iowa
- Coordinates: 40°49′36″N 93°36′25″W
- Country: USA
- State: Iowa
- County: Decatur

Area
  - Total: 0.68 sq mi (1.75 km^{2})
  - Land: 0.68 sq mi (1.75 km^{2})
  - Water: 0 sq mi (0.00 km^{2})
- Elevation: 1,116 ft (340 m)

Population (2020)
  - Total: 174
  - Density: 257.4/sq mi (99.38/km^{2})
- Time zone: UTC-6 (Central (CST))
  - Summer (DST): UTC-5 (CDT)
- ZIP code: 50103
- Area code: 641
- FIPS code: 19-29775
- GNIS feature ID: 2394852

Garden Grove is a small city in Decatur County, Iowa, United States. The population was 174 at the time of the 2020 census.

== History ==
On April 24, 1846, emigrants affiliated with the Church of Jesus Christ of Latter-day Saints under the direction of Brigham Young established a way station halfway into their trek across Iowa. This semi-permanent settlement was named Garden Grove because the entire grove was covered with wild onions as far as the eye could see. Within three weeks of their arrival, the pioneers enclosed and planted 715 acres (2.89 km^{2}). They founded the village to assist those who did not have sufficient means to continue their journey, as well as to support and supply future companies of pioneers.

When Brigham Young and the main company left Garden Grove on May 12, 1846, the poorest and least prepared were left behind. After the Saints arrived in Winter Quarters, Captain James Allen brought orders from President James Polk to enlist a battalion of Mormons for the War with Mexico. Brigham Young and other leaders rode back as far as Mt. Pisgah to encourage the men to enlist, and a letter was sent to the Saints in Garden Grove. Only one man from the Garden Grove settlement, Edward Bunker, enlisted and served in the Mormon Battalion.

In the fall of 1846, when the last of the Mormons were driven out of Nauvoo, Illinois, the exiles camped on the west shore of the Mississippi River. Two rescue parties were sent from Winter Quarters and Council Bluffs, and an additional group was requested from Garden Grove. Luman Shurtliff led the third rescue party and brought the poorest of the exiles to the settlement at Garden Grove.

Through the winter of 1846/47, about 600 Latter-day Saints resided in Garden Grove. By 1852, the Mormon settlers had moved on to Utah, selling the property and improvements to other American frontiersmen. Garden Grove is a site on the Mormon Pioneer National Historic Trail. A marker just west of the city, overlooking a wooded ravine, marks the site of the former Mormon Cemetery.

Garden Grove was a shipping point on the Chicago, Burlington and Quincy Railroad.

A strong EF2 tornado struck the town on March 5, 2022, causing major damage to several structures.

== Geography ==
According to the United States Census Bureau, the city has a total area of 0.69 square miles (1.79 km^{2}), all land.

== Demographics ==
Historical populations
Year	Pop.	±%
1880	549	—
1890	554	+0.9%
1900	651	+17.5%
1910	611	−6.1%
1920	666	+9.0%
1930	558	−16.2%
1940	558	+0.0%
1950	417	−25.3%
1960	335	−19.7%
1970	285	−14.9%
1980	297	+4.2%
1990	229	−22.9%
2000	250	+9.2%
2010	211	−15.6%
2020	174	−17.5%
Source:"U.S. Census website". United States Census Bureau. and Iowa Data Center; Source: U.S. Decennial Census

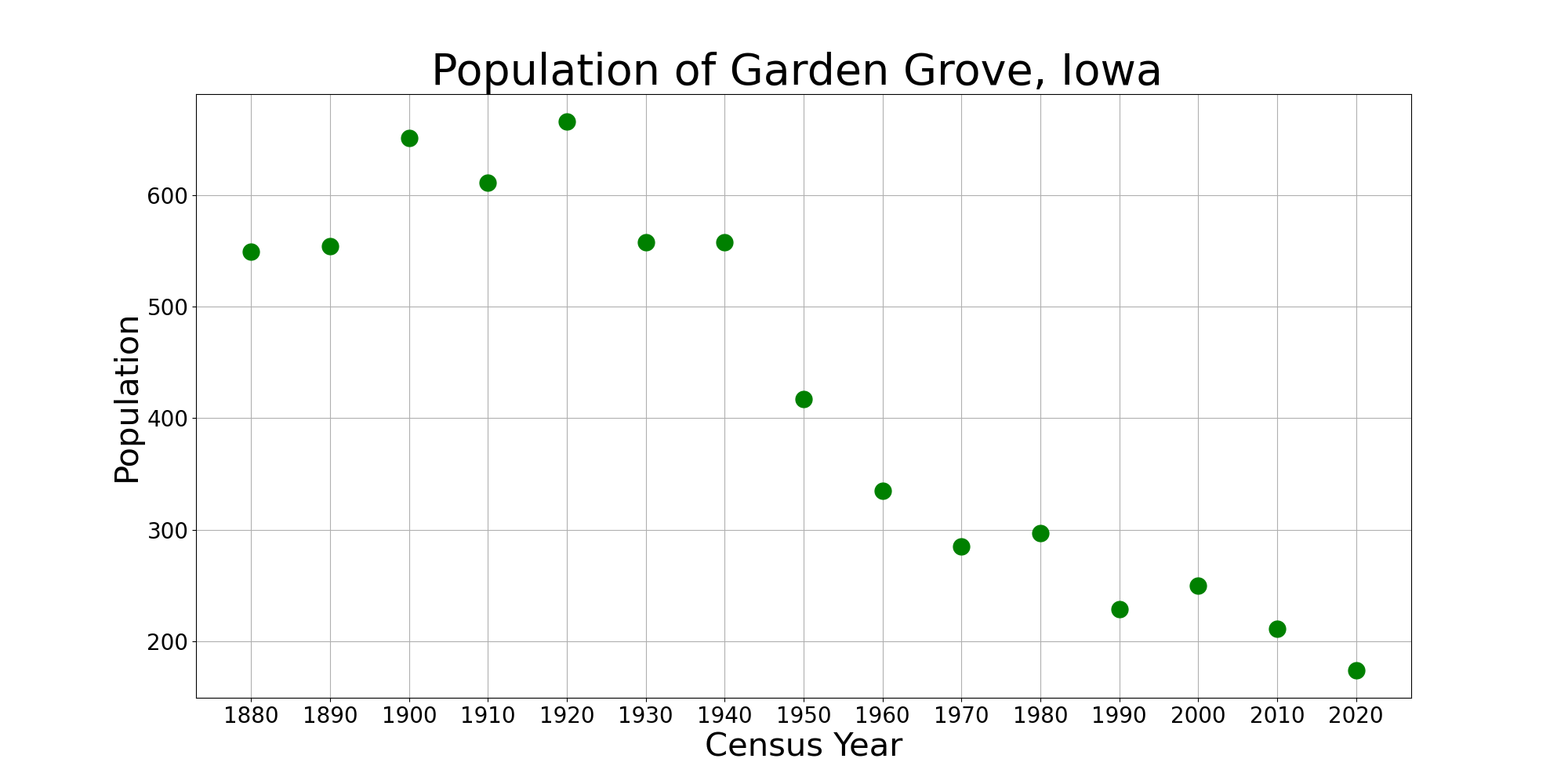
The population of Garden Grove, Iowa from US census data

=== 2020 census ===
As of the census of 2020, there were 174 people, 80 households, and 46 families residing in the city. The population density was 257.4 inhabitants per square mile (99.4/km^{2}). There were 91 housing units at an average density of 134.6 per square mile (52.0/km^{2}). The racial makeup of the city was 97.7% White, 0.6% Black or African American, 0.0% Native American, 0.0% Asian, 0.0% Pacific Islander, 0.6% from other races and 1.1% from two or more races. Hispanic or Latino persons of any race comprised 0.6% of the population.

Of the 80 households, 31.2% of which had children under the age of 18 living with them, 41.2% were married couples living together, 8.8% were cohabitating couples, 17.5% had a female householder with no spouse or partner present and 32.5% had a male householder with no spouse or partner present. 42.5% of all households were non-families. 33.8% of all households were made up of individuals, 10.0% had someone living alone who was 65 years old or older.

The median age in the city was 40.5 years. 25.3% of the residents were under the age of 20; 5.2% were between the ages of 20 and 24; 23.0% were from 25 and 44; 27.6% were from 45 and 64; and 19.0% were 65 years of age or older. The gender makeup of the city was 52.9% male and 47.1% female.

=== 2010 census ===
At the 2010 census there were 211 people in 78 households, including 49 families, in the city. The population density was 305.8 inhabitants per square mile (118.1/km^{2}). There were 103 housing units at an average density of 149.3 per square mile (57.6/km^{2}). The racial makup of the city was 97.6% White, 0.9% African American, and 1.4% from two or more races. Hispanic or Latino of any race were 0.9%.

Of the 78 households 32.1% had children under the age of 18 living with them, 35.9% were married couples living together, 17.9% had a female householder with no husband present, 9.0% had a male householder with no wife present, and 37.2% were non-families. 26.9% of households were one person and 6.4% were one person aged 65 or older. The average household size was 2.71 and the average family size was 2.96.

The median age was 38.1 years. 27% of residents were under the age of 18; 6.7% were between the ages of 18 and 24; 28.4% were from 25 to 44; 29.9% were from 45 to 64; and 8.1% were 65 or older. The gender makeup of the city was 51.7% male and 48.3% female.

=== 2000 census ===
As of the census of 2000, there were 250 people in 96 households, including 64 families, in the city. The population density was 359.0 inhabitants per square mile (138.6/km^{2}). There were 113 housing units at an average density of 162.3 per square mile (62.7/km^{2}). The racial makup of the city was 99.60% White and 0.40% Native American.

Of the 96 households 31.3% had children under the age of 18 living with them, 56.3% were married couples living together, 9.4% had a female householder with no husband present, and 32.3% were non-families. 28.1% of households were one person and 11.5% were one person aged 65 or older. The average household size was 2.60 and the average family size was 3.26.

The age distribution was 29.2% under the age of 18, 8.8% from 18 to 24, 26.0% from 25 to 44, 21.6% from 45 to 64, and 14.4% 65 or older. The median age was 36 years. For every 100 females, there were 115.5 males. For every 100 females age 18 and over, there were 92.4 males.

The median household income was $19,844 and the median family income was $29,464. Males had a median income of $21,875 versus $18,125 for females. The per capita income for the city was $10,301. About 28.3% of families and 35.5% of the population were below the poverty line, including 43.3% of those under the age of eighteen and 28.2% of those sixty five or over.

== Education ==
Mormon Trail Community School District operates schools serving the community.
