= David Camden de Leon =

American doctor (1816–1872)

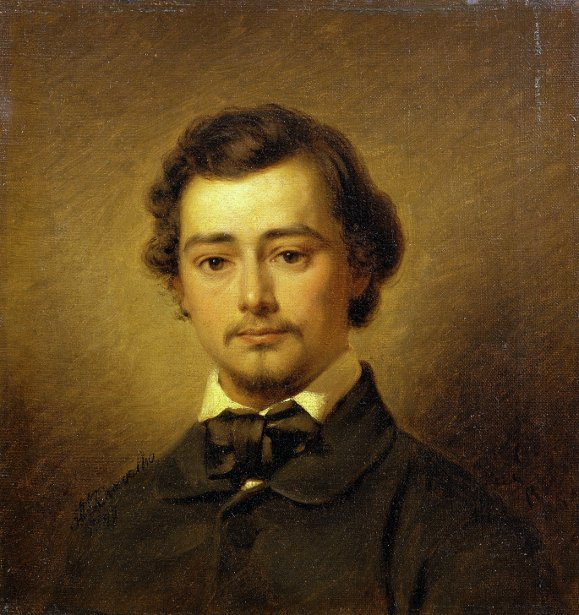
David Camden de Leon, the "fighting doctor," 1816–1872. Painting by Solomon Nunes Carvalho

David Camden de Leon or DeLeon (May 6, 1816 – September 2, 1872), known as "the fighting doctor", was born in Camden, South Carolina, of Sephardic Jewish parents, Mordecai Hendricks de Leon, a physician and three-term mayor of Columbia, South Carolina, and Rebecca Lopez de Leon. Edwin de Leon and Thomas Cooper de Leon were his brothers. He received the M.D. degree from the University of Pennsylvania in Philadelphia (where his parents had lived before moving to South Carolina) in 1836. He entered the Army in 1838 as Assistant Surgeon and "served with distinction in the Seminole war". At the beginning of the Mexican War, he went with General Zachary Taylor to the Rio Grande, was present at most of the battles in the campaign toward Mexico, and entered that city when it surrendered. At the battle of Chapultepec he earned the sobriquet of "the Fighting Doctor," as on two occasions led a charge of cavalry after the officer commanding had been killed or wounded. For his distinguished services and for his gallantry in action he twice received the thanks of Congress. He was then assigned to frontier duty, and in 1856 he became surgeon, with the rank of major.

Like most Southern officers in the regular Army, he resigned his commission at the outbreak of the Civil War. He was appointed by Jefferson Davis as the head of the Confederacy's medical department, and shortly thereafter acting surgeon-general of the Confederacy. At the close of the war he went with some other Confederate soldiers to Mexico, "vowing never to return to the conquered South until she was free". He soon returned "in disgust" to New Mexico, where he had been stationed for several years, and where he owned property. He continued in practice there until his death.

Leon, the county seat of Decatur County, Iowa, was named in his honor in 1855 by a fellow veteran of the Mexican War. Leon, Kansas, was subsequently named after the Iowa town.
