= Leon, Kansas =

City in Butler County, Kansas

- City
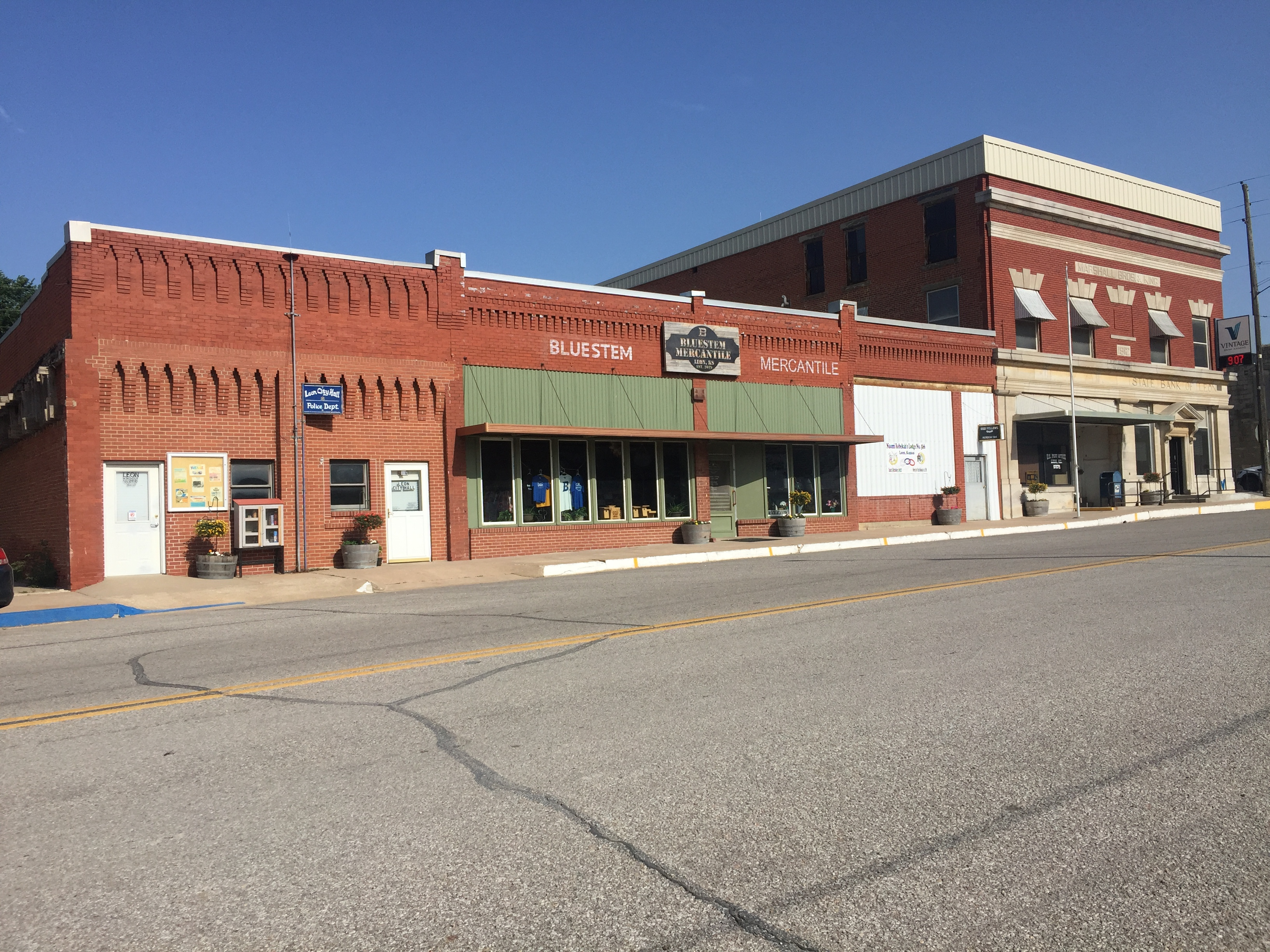
- City Hall, Elks Rebekah Hall, Bank (2022)

- Location within Butler County and Kansas

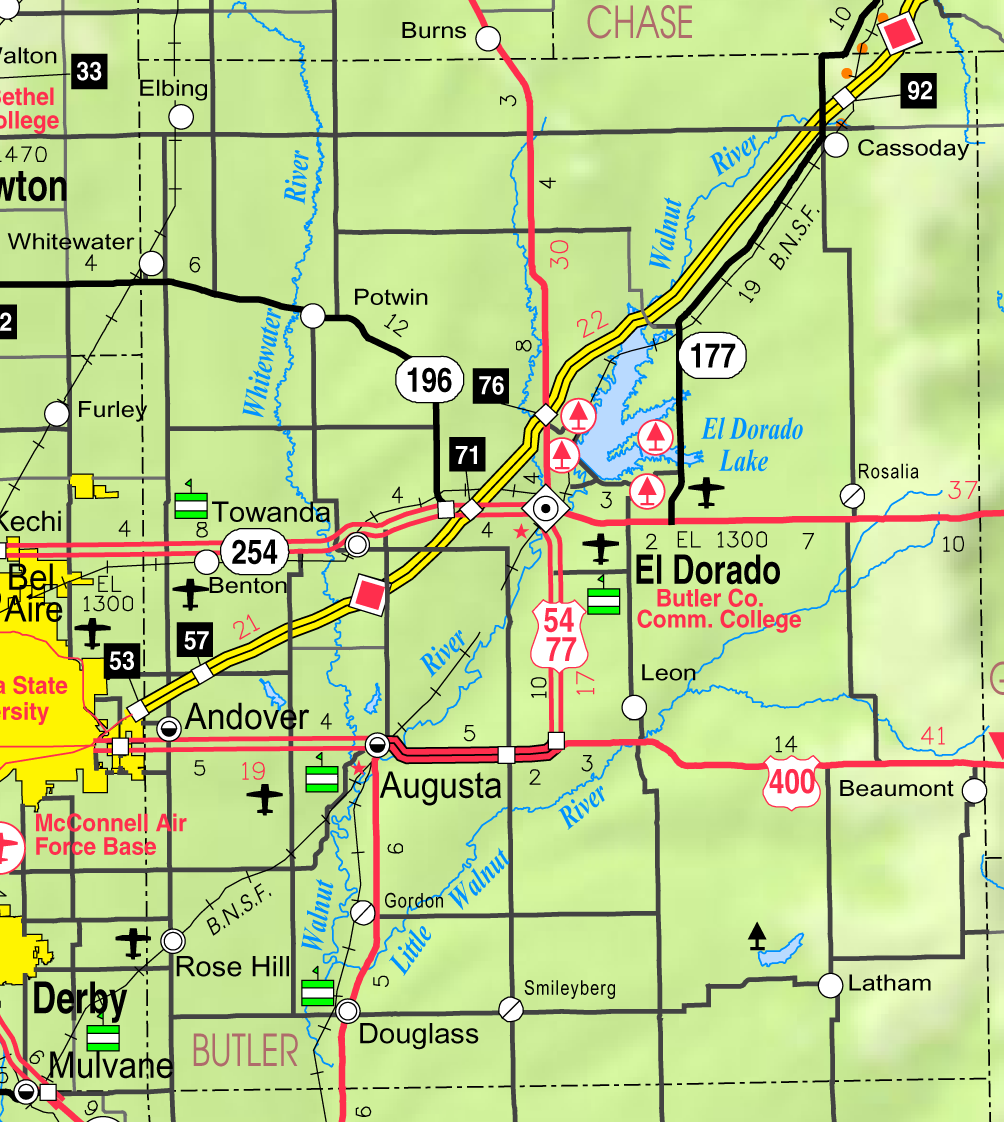
- KDOT map of Butler County (legend)
- Coordinates: 37°41′23″N 96°47′02″W
- Country: United States
- State: Kansas
- County: Butler
- Township: Little Walnut
- Founded: 1879
- Incorporated: 1882
- Named for: Leon, Iowa

Area
  - Total: 0.72 sq mi (1.87 km^{2})
  - Land: 0.72 sq mi (1.87 km^{2})
  - Water: 0 sq mi (0.00 km^{2})
- Elevation: 1,348 ft (411 m)

Population (2020)
  - Total: 669
  - Density: 927/sq mi (358/km^{2})
- Time zone: UTC-6 (CST)
  - Summer (DST): UTC-5 (CDT)
- ZIP Code: 67074
- Area code: 316
- FIPS code: 20-39450
- GNIS ID: 2395679
- Website: cityofleon.org

Leon is a city in Butler County, Kansas, United States. As of the 2020 census, the population of the city was 669.

== History ==
Leon was founded in 1879. It was named after Leon, Iowa, which in turn was named after the Jewish "Fighting Doctor" David Camden de Leon. The first building, built in 1879, was the blacksmith shop of H. Belton. Leon was incorporated as a city in 1882.

== Geography ==
According to the United States Census Bureau, the city has a total area of 0.75 square miles (1.94 km^{2}), all land. Leon is located in Little Walnut Township, Butler County, Kansas, and it is its principal city.

== Demographics ==
Historical population
Census	Pop.	Note	%±
1880	113		—
1890	456		303.5%
1900	527		15.6%
1910	494		−6.3%
1920	427		−13.6%
1930	587		37.5%
1940	573		−2.4%
1950	518		−9.6%
1960	541		4.4%
1970	510		−5.7%
1980	667		30.8%
1990	707		6.0%
2000	645		−8.8%
2010	704		9.1%
2020	669		−5.0%
U.S. Decennial Census

=== 2020 census ===
The 2020 United States census counted 669 people, 264 households, and 188 families in Leon. The population density was 915.2 per square mile (353.4/km^{2}). There were 291 housing units at an average density of 398.1 per square mile (153.7/km^{2}). The racial makeup was 87.0% (582) white or European American (84.16% non-Hispanic white), 0.6% (4) black or African-American, 0.9% (6) Native American or Alaska Native, 0.3% (2) Asian, 0.0% (0) Pacific Islander or Native Hawaiian, 0.45% (3) from other races, and 10.76% (72) from two or more races. Hispanic or Latino of any race was 5.68% (38) of the population.

Of the 264 households, 36.4% had children under the age of 18; 45.8% were married couples living together; 24.6% had a female householder with no spouse or partner present. 24.2% of households consisted of individuals and 10.2% had someone living alone who was 65 years of age or older. The average household size was 2.2 and the average family size was 2.6. The percent of those with a bachelor's degree or higher was estimated to be 5.8% of the population.

28.4% of the population was under the age of 18, 8.5% from 18 to 24, 22.7% from 25 to 44, 23.0% from 45 to 64, and 17.3% who were 65 years of age or older. The median age was 37.2 years. For every 100 females, there were 113.1 males. For every 100 females ages 18 and older, there were 101.3 males.

The 2016–2020 5-year American Community Survey estimates show that the median household income was $55,417 (with a margin of error of +/- $14,265) and the median family income was $69,375 (+/- $28,251). Males had a median income of $42,750 (+/- $11,512) versus $48,214 (+/- $24,962) for females. The median income for those above 16 years old was $44,750 (+/- $9,018). Approximately, 18.4% of families and 25.9% of the population were below the poverty line, including 45.7% of those under the age of 18 and 10.5% of those ages 65 or over.

=== 2010 census ===
As of the census of 2010, there were 704 people, 264 households, and 188 families residing in the city. The population density was 938.7 inhabitants per square mile (362.4/km^{2}). There were 297 housing units at an average density of 396.0 per square mile (152.9/km^{2}). The racial makeup of the city was 91.9% White, 0.6% African American, 2.0% Native American, 0.3% Asian, 1.6% from other races, and 3.7% from two or more races. Hispanic or Latino of any race were 3.0% of the population.

There were 264 households, of which 38.3% had children under the age of 18 living with them, 50.0% were married couples living together, 11.7% had a female householder with no husband present, 9.5% had a male householder with no wife present, and 28.8% were non-families. 25.8% of all households were made up of individuals, and 14% had someone living alone who was 65 years of age or older. The average household size was 2.67 and the average family size was 3.13.

The median age in the city was 34.6 years. 30.3% of residents were under the age of 18; 8.3% were between the ages of 18 and 24; 22.1% were from 25 to 44; 24.1% were from 45 to 64; and 15.2% were 65 years of age or older. The gender makeup of the city was 50.6% male and 49.4% female.

=== 2000 census ===
As of the census of 2000, there were 645 people, 245 households, and 175 families residing in the city. The population density was 1,090.8 inhabitants per square mile (421.2/km^{2}). There were 269 housing units at an average density of 454.9 per square mile (175.6/km^{2}). The racial makeup of the city was 93.64% White, 0.62% African American, 1.71% Native American, 1.55% from other races, and 2.48% from two or more races. Hispanic or Latino of any race were 4.96% of the population.

There were 245 households, out of which 38.4% had children under the age of 18 living with them, 57.6% were married couples living together, 10.6% had a female householder with no husband present, and 28.2% were non-families. 24.5% of all households were made up of individuals, and 11.8% had someone living alone who was 65 years of age or older. The average household size was 2.63 and the average family size was 3.18.

In the city, the population was spread out, with 31.6% under the age of 18, 7.4% from 18 to 24, 27.9% from 25 to 44, 19.2% from 45 to 64, and 13.8% who were 65 years of age or older. The median age was 33 years. For every 100 females, there were 89.1 males. For every 100 females age 18 and over, there were 95.1 males.

The median income for a household in the city was $40,089, and the median income for a family was $48,000. Males had a median income of $35,938 versus $25,859 for females. The per capita income for the city was $18,953. About 6.7% of families and 6.6% of the population were below the poverty line, including 6.6% of those under age 18 and 12.8% of those age 65 or over.

== Education ==
The community is served by Bluestem USD 205 public school district. The Bluestem High School mascot is Lions.

Prior to school unification, the Leon High School mascot was also Lions. The Leon Lions won the following Kansas State High School championships:

- 1948 Boys Track & Field - Class B
- 1949 Boys Track & Field - Class B
- 1965 Boys Cross Country - Class B

2017 KSHSAA Class 2A-1A State Champions Baseball
