= Central Decatur Community School District =

Public school district in Leon, Iowa, united States

Location
- 1201 NE Poplar Street; Leon, Iowa Decatur County United States
- Coordinates: 40.7481°N 93.7406°W

District information
- Type: Local school district
- Grades: K-12
- Superintendent: Chris Coffelt
- Schools: 3
- Budget: $10,148,000 (2020-21)
- NCES District ID: 1906900

Students and staff
- Students: 697 (2022-23)
- Teachers: 51.32 FTE
- Staff: 57.43 FTE
- Student–teacher ratio: 13.58
- Athletic conference: Pride of Iowa
- District mascot: Cardinals
- Colors: Red and White

Other information
- School Newspaper: Cardinal Crier
- Website: www.centraldecatur.org

Central Decatur Community School District is a rural public school district for Decatur County, Iowa, headquartered in the community of Leon, Iowa. The district contains students from Decatur City, Grand River, Davis City, and Pleasanton. The district covers over 60% of Decatur County.

The average ACT score is 25 and over 95% of all students graduate high school. The colors are red and white, and the mascot is a cardinal.

== District Administration ==
Superintendent of Schools
Chris Coffelt

== Schools ==
The district operates three schools, all in Leon:

South Elementary School grades pre-k through 2nd
201 SE 6th Street

North Elementary School grades 3rd through 6th
1203 NE Poplar Street

Junior-Senior High School grades 7th through 12th
1201 NE Poplar Street

=== Central Decatur Junior-Senior High School ===
==== Athletics ====
The Cardinals compete in the Pride of Iowa Conference.

Central Decatur fields teams in football, cross country, wrestling (with Lamoni Community School District), boys and girls basketball, bowling, golf, track and field, baseball, and softball.

== See also ==
- List of school districts in Iowa
- List of high schools in Iowa
