= Decatur County Courthouse =

Decatur County Courthouse may refer to:

- Decatur County Courthouse (Georgia), Bainbridge, Georgia
- Decatur County Courthouse (Indiana), Greensburg, Indiana
- Decatur County Courthouse (Iowa), Leon, Iowa
- Decatur County Courthouse (Kansas), Oberlin, Kansas
