= Edwin de Leon =

American diplomat (1818–1891)

Edwin de Leon

Edwin de Leon (May 4, 1818 – November 30, 1891) was a Confederate diplomat, writer, and journalist.

== Biography ==
De Leon was born in Columbia, South Carolina of Sephardic Jewish parents, Mordecai Hendricks de Leon, a physician and three-term mayor of Columbia, South Carolina, and Rebecca Lopez de Leon. He was the brother of newspaperman Thomas Cooper de Leon as well as another brother David Camden de Leon and three sisters: Agnes, Maria Louisa, and Adeline Mary (who married Joseph Henry Adams, of Boston). Edwin's father Mordecai De Leon, a physician, removed from Philadelphia to Columbia, South Carolina, and was mayor of that city for several years. De Leon married Ellen Mary Novlan of Rothgar, Ireland, on August 25, 1858, in Somerset, England.

(In a biography of Jefferson Davis, Edwin De Leon is incorrectly identified as "Daniel De Leon". Daniel De Leon was an American socialist organizer and theoretician and the long-time leader of the Socialist Labor Party. When the Civil War began, Daniel De Leon was eight years old and living on the island of Curaçao.)

De Leon graduated from South Carolina College, where he was a member of the Euphradian Society, and studied law, but soon turned to literature and politics. He became an active collaborator on the Southern Review, the Magnolia, the Southern Literary Messenger, and other periodicals. Removing to Savannah, Georgia, he took editorial charge of the Savannah Republican and made it a political factor in the state; his next charge was the Columbia, South Carolina Telegraph, a daily.

== Young America ==
De Leon was a leader of the Young America movement. At the invitation of a committee of Southern members of Congress, De Leon established The Southern Press, which had a large circulation in Washington during the early 1850s. For his service during the Pierce campaign, he was appointed consul-general to Egypt, a position he held for two terms with marked success. At the commencement of the Crimean War, an order was issued by the Porte expelling all Greeks from the Ottoman dominion. The Greeks in Egypt appealed to De Leon, who took them under the protection of the American flag, guaranteed their good behavior, and insisted that they should not be interfered with. The home government approved his course, and Congress paid him the compliment of ordering the printing of his dispatches. The King of Greece tendered him the grand cross of the Order of San Sauveur, but Leon declined on the grounds that it was anti-republican.

De Leon rendered conspicuous services in protecting American missionaries at Jaffa, and for this he received for the second time the thanks of the State Department. Through his influence, American commerce with Egypt was enlarged and American machinery introduced into that country. It was during his incumbency of the consul-general-ship that he heard of the secession of his native state from the Union. He at once forwarded his resignation. Returning home, he ran the blockade and made his way to New Orleans. Thence he proceeded to Richmond and reported to Jefferson Davis, volunteering for military duty. Davis sent him instead on a confidential mission to Europe to secure the recognition of the Southern Confederacy by foreign powers. De Leon refused any salary or remuneration for his services, but advanced from his own purse considerable sums for the use of the Confederacy. He again ran the blockade, reached Nassau, and arrived in England in July 1862. As a diplomatic agent he was received in the highest circles, both in England and in France, and personally pleaded the cause of the Confederacy with Lord Palmerston and Napoleon III.

His dispatches to the Southern government were intercepted, however, and were published by order of secretary of state, William H. Seward.

Through his friend William Makepeace Thackeray, De Leon became a member of the Garrick Club and a contributor to the Cornhill Magazine. After the Civil War, De Leon returned to America and settled in New York City. He frequently contributed to the leading magazines, chiefly on Eastern topics. Among his works are: Thirty Years of My Life on Three Continents; The Khedive's Egypt; Under the Star and Under the Crescent; and Askaros Kassis, the Copt, a novel, republished in England.

He died in New York City on December 1, 1891.

== Writings ==
- De Leon, Edwin (1870). Askaros Kassis, the Copt. A romance of modern Egypt. Philadelphia: J. B. Lippincott & co.
- De Leon, Edwin (1878). The Khedive's Egypt; or, The old house of bondage under new masters. New York: Harper & brothers.
- De Leon, Edwin (1890). Thirty years of my life on three continents. London: Ward and Downey.
- De Leon, Edwin (2005). Davis, William C. (ed.). Secret History of Confederate Diplomacy Abroad. University Press of Kansas. ISBN 978-0-7006-1411-0. (first published in the New York Citizen 1867-68)
- Articles in Harper's Magazine
