= Mary C. McAdams =

American politician (1869–1950)

Mary Agnes Cowan McAdams (April 29, 1869 – September 7, 1950) was an American politician from Illinois most notable for being one of the first Democratic women to serve in the Illinois House of Representatives.

== Biography ==
Mary Cowan McAdams was born in London, England to John and Catherine Cowan. Her father was born in England, her mother in Ireland. Before her first birthday, her parents immigrated to the United States. The family initially settled in Pittsburgh, Pennsylvania before moving to Murphysboro, Illinois. As a young woman, she traveled Illinois and studied still life art in Rockford, Chicago, and Springfield. In Springfield, she took a position as assistant postmistress of the Illinois General Assembly and was later promoted to postmistress during the 39th, 40th, and 41st General Assemblies. She also served one term as the superintendent of pages. In 1901, she married John McAdams, a member of the Illinois Senate from Quincy.

Cowan McAdams was very civically active as director of Civic Improvement League, the Chaddock School for Boys, Humane Society, Woman's Forum, an active member of the Presbyterian Church, and as President of the League of Women Voters of Adams County. In 1926, she and Sarah Bond Hanley became the first two Democratic women to be elected to the Illinois General Assembly as members of the Illinois House of Representatives. While a member of the Illinois House, she served on the committees for Agriculture; Charities and Corrections; Conservation, Fish and Game; Contingent Expenses; Education; and Efficiency and Economy. In 1929, her husband John died at the age of 86. She did not run for reelection in 1930. She was an unsuccessful candidate for the Democratic nomination for the Illinois House of Representatives in 1934. She finished, losing to Joseph Edward Heckenkamp, Thomas J. Lenane, and Wlilliam F. Gibbs respectively. In 1936, she was an unsuccessful candidate for the Democratic nomination for the Illinois Senate from the 36th district. She finished third of five candidates, once again losing to State Representative Joseph Edward Heckenkamp. Heckenkamp would go on to win the general election. She continued her activism including roles as Vice President of the League of Women Voters of Adams County and President of the World Peace Memorial Association.
