= Decatur City, Iowa =

Decatur, Iowa
- City
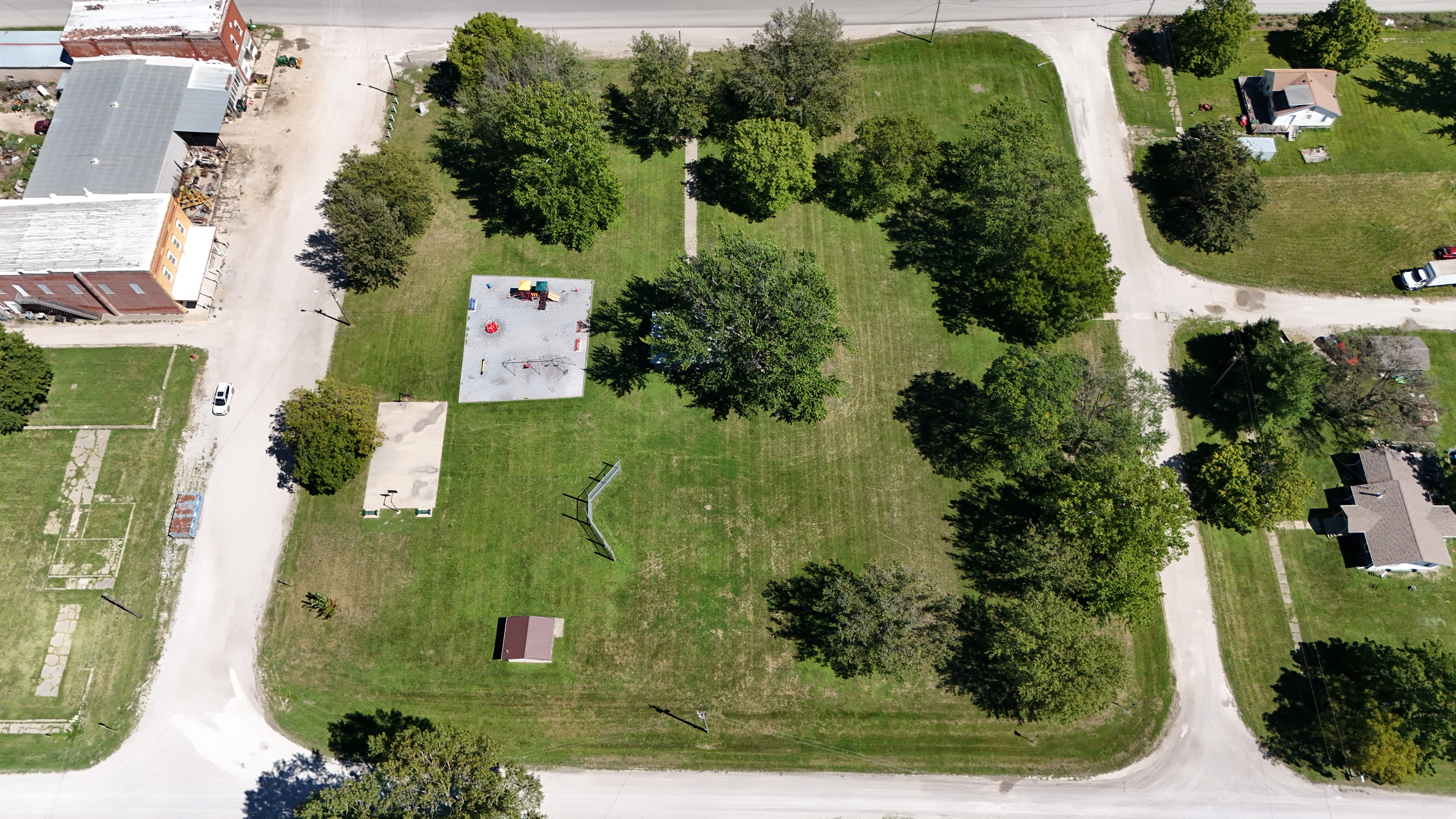
- A city park in the town square of Decatur

- Location of Decatur, Iowa
- Coordinates: 40°44′34″N 93°49′58″W
- Country: United States
- State: Iowa
- County: Decatur

Area
  - Total: 0.38 sq mi (0.99 km^{2})
  - Land: 0.38 sq mi (0.98 km^{2})
  - Water: 0.0039 sq mi (0.01 km^{2})
- Elevation: 1,129 ft (344 m)

Population (2020)
  - Total: 175
  - Density: 462.8/sq mi (178.68/km^{2})
- Time zone: UTC-6 (Central (CST))
  - Summer (DST): UTC-5 (CDT)
- ZIP code: 50067
- Area code: 641
- FIPS code: 19-19360
- GNIS feature ID: 2394482

Decatur is a city in Decatur County, Iowa, United States. The population was 175 at the time of the 2020 census.

== History ==
Decatur was the first county seat of Decatur County, until 1853, when the seat was transferred to Leon.

Decatur was incorporated in 1875.

In 2023, the city council had the city's name clarified through a vote in the regular city election (public measure) as previously there are documents calling it both Decatur and Decatur City. Upon the certification of that election in November 2023, the city is officially named the city of Decatur.

== Geography ==
Decatur is located on Iowa Highway 2 just east of I-35, 4.5 miles west of Leon and approximately eight miles north-northeast of Lamoni.

According to the United States Census Bureau, the city has a total area of 0.40 square miles (1.04 km^{2}), all land.

== Demographics ==
Historical populations
Year	Pop.	±%
1880	235	—
1890	215	−8.5%
1900	367	+70.7%
1910	311	−15.3%
1920	300	−3.5%
1930	282	−6.0%
1940	275	−2.5%
1950	196	−28.7%
1960	203	+3.6%
1970	198	−2.5%
1980	199	+0.5%
1990	177	−11.1%
2000	199	+12.4%
2010	197	−1.0%
2020	175	−11.2%
Source:"U.S. Census website". United States Census Bureau. and Iowa Data Center; Source: U.S. Decennial Census

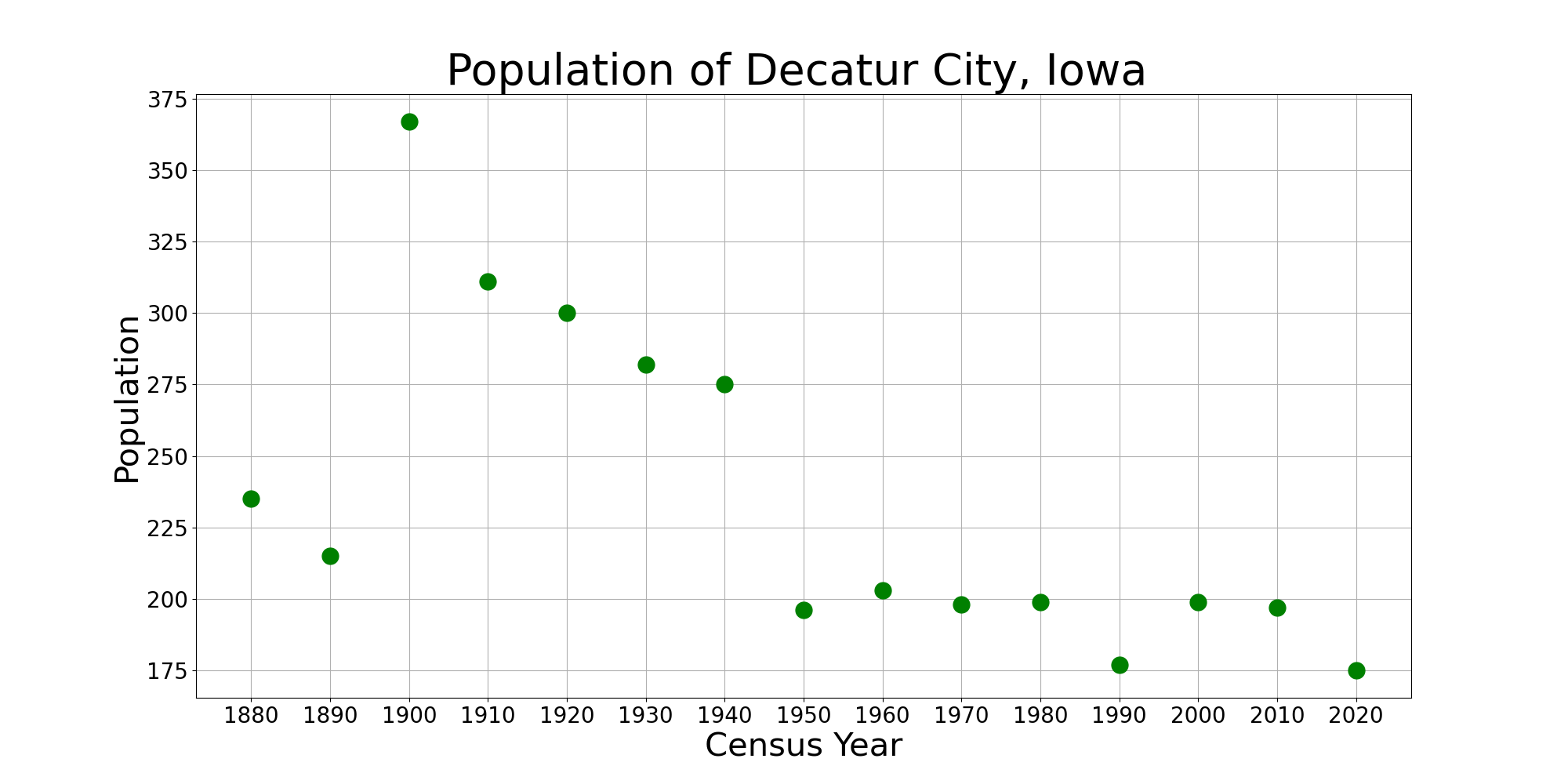
The population of Decatur, Iowa from US census data

=== 2020 census ===
As of the census of 2020, there were 175 people, 68 households, and 52 families residing in the city. The population density was 462.8 inhabitants per square mile (178.7/km^{2}). There were 90 housing units at an average density of 238.0 per square mile (91.9/km^{2}). The racial makeup of the city was 95.4% White, 1.1% Black or African American, 0.0% Native American, 0.6% Asian, 0.0% Pacific Islander, 1.1% from other races and 1.7% from two or more races. Hispanic or Latino persons of any race comprised 1.7% of the population.

Of the 68 households, 35.3% of which had children under the age of 18 living with them, 55.9% were married couples living together, 2.9% were cohabitating couples, 17.6% had a female householder with no spouse or partner present and 23.5% had a male householder with no spouse or partner present. 23.5% of all households were non-families. 20.6% of all households were made up of individuals, 8.8% had someone living alone who was 65 years old or older.

The median age in the city was 40.6 years. 28.0% of the residents were under the age of 20; 1.7% were between the ages of 20 and 24; 26.3% were from 25 and 44; 27.4% were from 45 and 64; and 16.6% were 65 years of age or older. The gender makeup of the city was 53.7% male and 46.3% female.

=== 2010 census ===
As of the census of 2010, there were 197 people, 78 households, and 53 families living in the city. The population density was 492.5 inhabitants per square mile (190.2/km^{2}). There were 91 housing units at an average density of 227.5 per square mile (87.8/km^{2}). The racial makeup of the city was 95.9% White, 0.5% Native American, 1.0% Asian, and 2.5% from two or more races. Hispanic or Latino of any race were 1.0% of the population.

There were 78 households, of which 28.2% had children under the age of 18 living with them, 52.6% were married couples living together, 10.3% had a female householder with no husband present, 5.1% had a male householder with no wife present, and 32.1% were non-families. 24.4% of all households were made up of individuals, and 12.8% had someone living alone who was 65 years of age or older. The average household size was 2.53 and the average family size was 3.08.

The median age in the city was 39.5 years. 23.9% of residents were under the age of 18; 8.1% were between the ages of 18 and 24; 28.4% were from 25 to 44; 24.4% were from 45 to 64; and 15.2% were 65 years of age or older. The gender makeup of the city was 50.3% male and 49.7% female.

=== 2000 census ===
As of the census of 2000, there were 199 people, 92 households, and 50 families living in the city. The population density was 508.5 inhabitants per square mile (196.3/km^{2}). There were 103 housing units at an average density of 263.2 per square mile (101.6/km^{2}). The racial makeup of the city was 98.49% White, 1.51% from other races. Hispanic or Latino of any race were 1.01% of the population.

There were 92 households, out of which 26.1% had children under the age of 18 living with them, 48.9% were married couples living together, 6.5% had a female householder with no husband present, and 44.6% were non-families. 41.3% of all households were made up of individuals, and 19.6% had someone living alone who was 65 years of age or older. The average household size was 2.16 and the average family size was 2.98.

In the city, the population was spread out, with 26.1% under the age of 18, 6.5% from 18 to 24, 29.6% from 25 to 44, 26.1% from 45 to 64, and 11.6% who were 65 years of age or older. The median age was 37 years. For every 100 females, there were 89.5 males. For every 100 females age 18 and over, there were 93.4 males.

The median income for a household in the city was $21,250, and the median income for a family was $27,917. Males had a median income of $22,000 versus $16,250 for females. The per capita income for the city was $14,394. About 15.4% of families and 26.3% of the population were below the poverty line, including 33.3% of those under the age of eighteen and 16.1% of those 65 or over.

== Education ==
The Central Decatur Community School District operates local area public schools.

== Transportation ==
While there is no fixed-route transit service in Decatur, intercity bus service is provided by Jefferson Lines in nearby Lamoni.
