= Grand River, Iowa =

- City
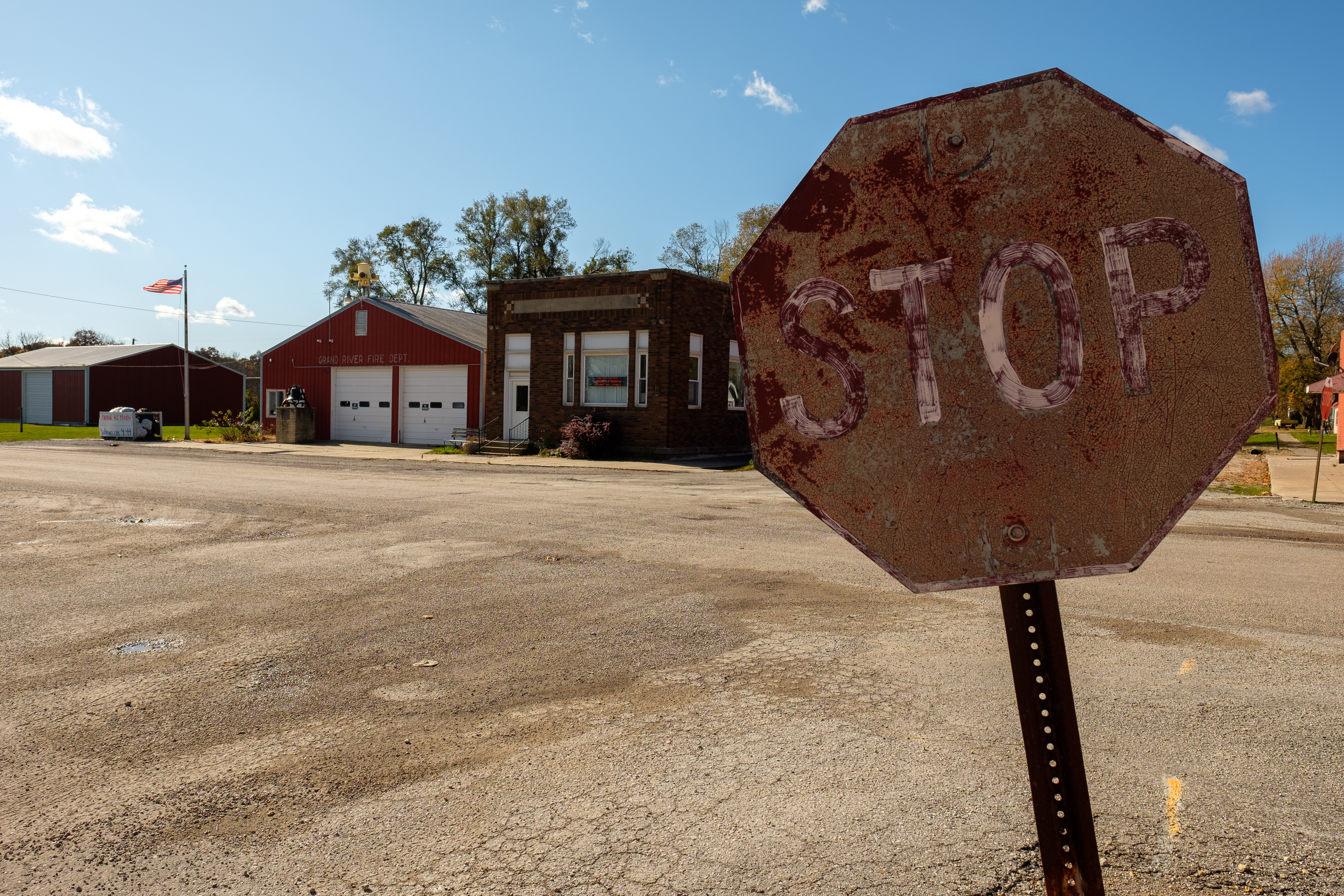
- Downtown Grand River

- Location of Grand River, Iowa
- Coordinates: 40°49′8″N 93°57′47″W
- Country: United States
- State: Iowa
- County: Decatur

Area
  - Total: 0.19 sq mi (0.49 km^{2})
  - Land: 0.19 sq mi (0.49 km^{2})
  - Water: 0 sq mi (0.00 km^{2})
- Elevation: 1,017 ft (310 m)

Population (2020)
  - Total: 196
  - Density: 1,037.5/sq mi (400.57/km^{2})
- Time zone: UTC-6 (Central (CST))
  - Summer (DST): UTC-5 (CDT)
- ZIP code: 50108
- Area code: 641
- FIPS code: 19-32070
- GNIS feature ID: 2394954

Grand River is a city in northwest Decatur County, Iowa, United States. The population was 196 at the time of the 2020 census.

== History ==
Grand River got its start in the year 1881, following construction of the Humeston and Shenandoah Railroad through the territory.

== Geography ==
Grand River is located along the Thompson River (a tributary of the Grand River).

According to the United States Census Bureau, the city has a total area of 0.21 square miles (0.54 km^{2}), all land.

== Demographics ==
Historical populations
Year	Pop.	±%
1900	326	—
1910	333	+2.1%
1920	425	+27.6%
1930	395	−7.1%
1940	374	−5.3%
1950	350	−6.4%
1960	284	−18.9%
1970	211	−25.7%
1980	188	−10.9%
1990	171	−9.0%
2000	225	+31.6%
2010	236	+4.9%
2020	196	−16.9%
Source:"U.S. Census website". United States Census Bureau. and Iowa Data Center; Source: U.S. Decennial Census

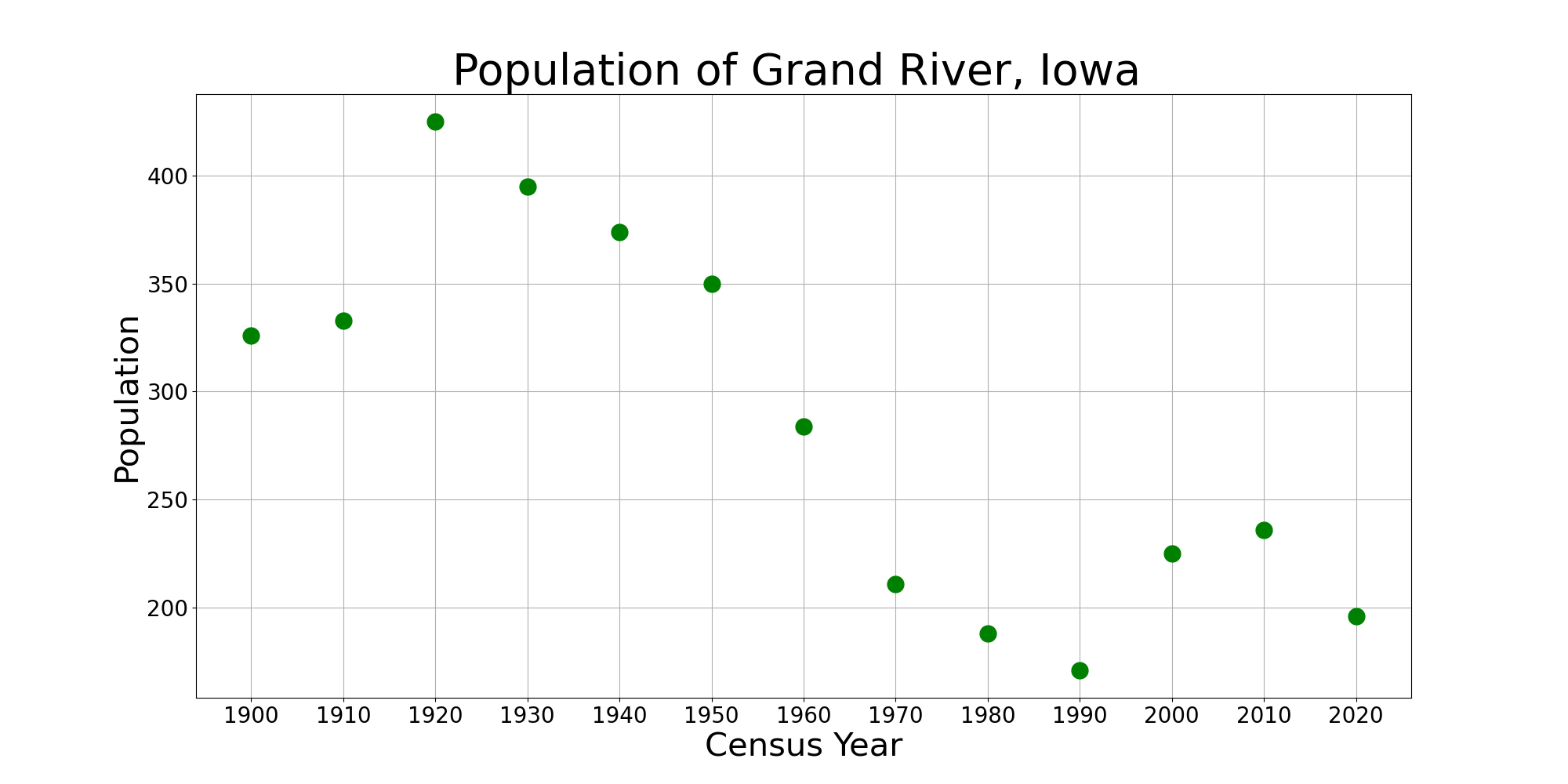
The population of Grand River, Iowa from US census data

=== 2020 census ===
As of the census of 2020, there were 196 people, 93 households, and 56 families residing in the city. The population density was 1,037.5 inhabitants per square mile (400.6/km^{2}). There were 126 housing units at an average density of 667.0 per square mile (257.5/km^{2}). The racial makeup of the city was 93.9% White, 0.0% Black or African American, 1.0% Native American, 0.0% Asian, 0.0% Pacific Islander, 0.0% from other races and 5.1% from two or more races. Hispanic or Latino persons of any race comprised 1.0% of the population.

Of the 93 households, 25.8% of which had children under the age of 18 living with them, 45.2% were married couples living together, 8.6% were cohabitating couples, 28.0% had a female householder with no spouse or partner present and 18.3% had a male householder with no spouse or partner present. 39.8% of all households were non-families. 32.3% of all households were made up of individuals, 8.6% had someone living alone who was 65 years old or older.

The median age in the city was 41.3 years. 22.4% of the residents were under the age of 20; 4.6% were between the ages of 20 and 24; 26.0% were from 25 and 44; 20.9% were from 45 and 64; and 26.0% were 65 years of age or older. The gender makeup of the city was 51.0% male and 49.0% female.

=== 2010 census ===
At the 2010 census there were 236 people in 99 households, including 58 families, in the city. The population density was 1,123.8 inhabitants per square mile (433.9/km^{2}). There were 128 housing units at an average density of 609.5 per square mile (235.3/km^{2}). The racial makup of the city was 96.6% White, 0.4% Native American, 1.3% from other races, and 1.7% from two or more races. Hispanic or Latino of any race were 3.4%.

Of the 99 households 29.3% had children under the age of 18 living with them, 42.4% were married couples living together, 12.1% had a female householder with no husband present, 4.0% had a male householder with no wife present, and 41.4% were non-families. 35.4% of households were one person and 23.3% were one person aged 65 or older. The average household size was 2.38 and the average family size was 3.14.

The median age was 38 years. 25.8% of residents were under the age of 18; 9% were between the ages of 18 and 24; 20.3% were from 25 to 44; 21.7% were from 45 to 64; and 23.3% were 65 or older. The gender makeup of the city was 48.3% male and 51.7% female.

=== 2000 census ===
At the 2000 census there were 225 people in 104 households, including 55 families, in the city. The population density was 1,079.8 inhabitants per square mile (416.9/km^{2}). There were 123 housing units at an average density of 590.3 per square mile (227.9/km^{2}). The racial makup of the city was 97.78% White, 0.44% Native American, 0.44% from other races, and 1.33% from two or more races. Hispanic or Latino of any race were 0.44%.

Of the 104 households 24.0% had children under the age of 18 living with them, 45.2% were married couples living together, 6.7% had a female householder with no husband present, and 46.2% were non-families. 41.3% of households were one person and 28.8% were one person aged 65 or older. The average household size was 2.16 and the average family size was 3.02.

The age distribution was 24.0% under the age of 18, 5.3% from 18 to 24, 20.9% from 25 to 44, 19.6% from 45 to 64, and 30.2% 65 or older. The median age was 44 years. For every 100 females, there were 73.1 males. For every 100 females age 18 and over, there were 69.3 males.

The median household income was $22,344 and the median family income was $26,964. Males had a median income of $23,750 versus $19,750 for females. The per capita income for the city was $14,272. About 7.0% of families and 14.9% of the population were below the poverty line, including 6.7% of those under the age of eighteen and 27.0% of those sixty five or over.

== Education ==
The Central Decatur Community School District operates local area public schools.
