= Le Roy, Iowa =

- City
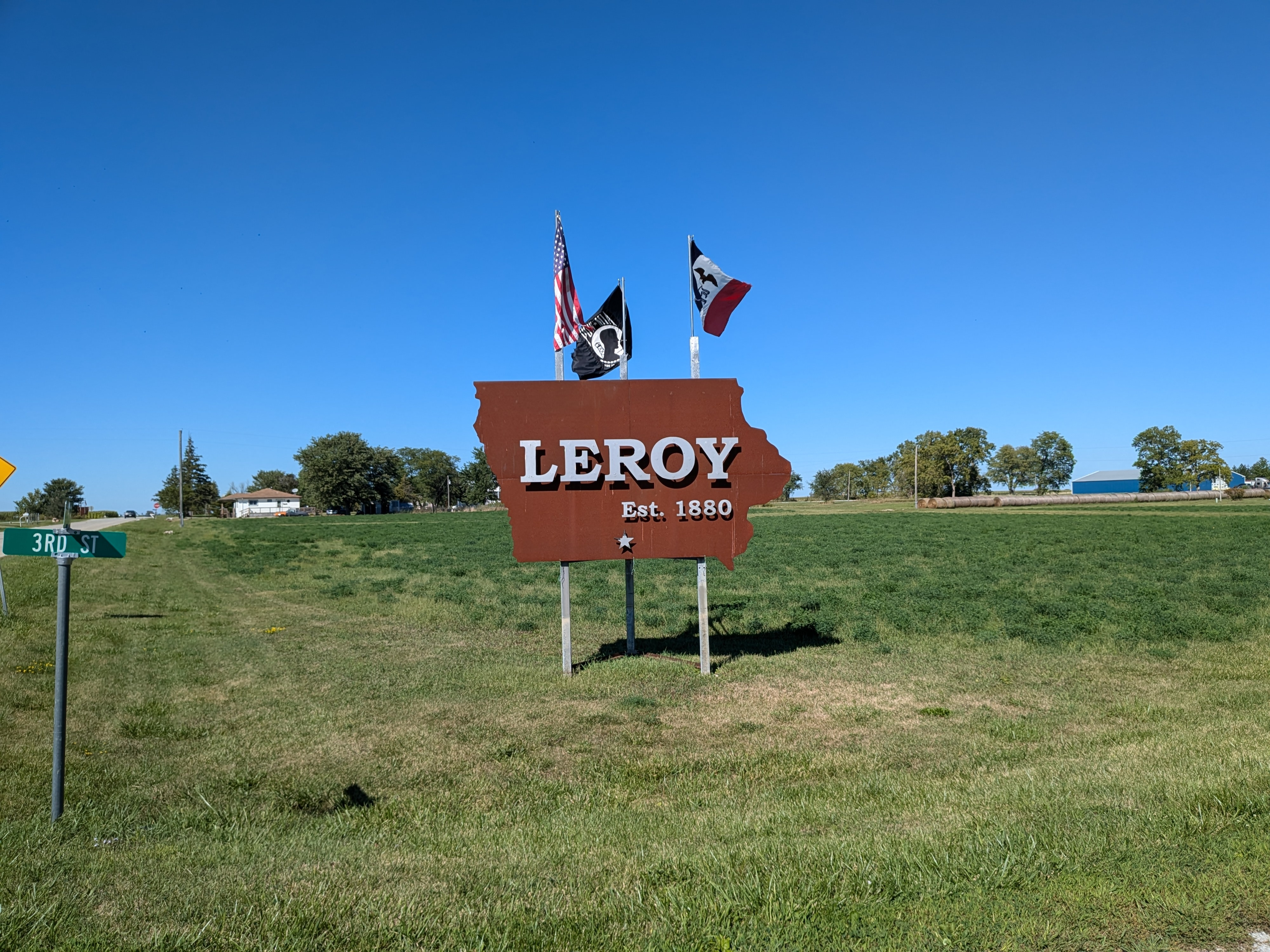
- Welcome Sign in Le Roy

- Location of Le Roy, Iowa
- Coordinates: 40°52′39″N 93°35′35″W
- Country: United States
- State: Iowa
- County: Decatur

Area
  - Total: 0.38 sq mi (0.98 km^{2})
  - Land: 0.38 sq mi (0.98 km^{2})
  - Water: 0 sq mi (0.00 km^{2})
- Elevation: 1,116 ft (340 m)

Population (2020)
  - Total: 11
  - Density: 28.9/sq mi (11.17/km^{2})
- Time zone: UTC-6 (Central (CST))
  - Summer (DST): UTC-5 (CDT)
- ZIP code: 50123
- Area code: 641
- FIPS code: 19-44580
- GNIS feature ID: 2395658

Le Roy is a city in Decatur County, Iowa, United States. The population was 11 in the 2020 census, a decrease from 13 in 2000.

As of the 2020 census, Le Roy is the smallest incorporated city in Iowa. In the 2000 census, it was the second smallest, and in the 2010 census was tied with Beaconsfield for smallest.

== History ==
Le Roy got its start in 1880, following construction of the Humeston and Shenandoah Railroad through the territory. The city is named for Leroy Buffman, an early settler.

== Geography ==
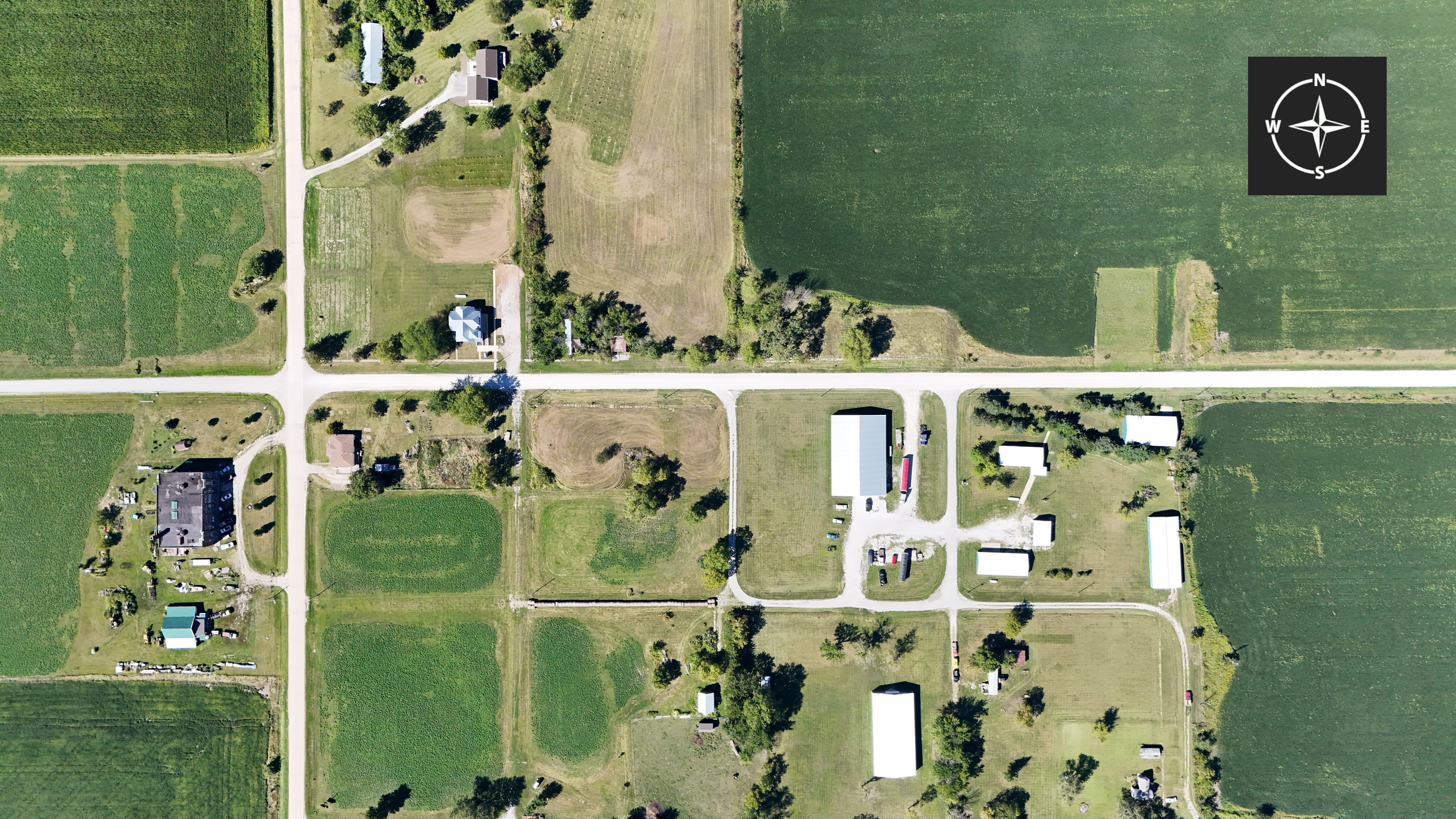
An aerial photograph of Le Roy, Iowa, taken on 31 August 2024

According to the United States Census Bureau, the city has a total area of 0.33 square miles (0.85 km^{2}), all land.

== Demographics ==
Historical population
Census	Pop.	Note	%±
1910	185		—
1920	174		−5.9%
1930	142		−18.4%
1940	129		−9.2%
1950	91		−29.5%
1960	70		−23.1%
1970	43		−38.6%
1980	31		−27.9%
1990	34		9.7%
2000	13		−61.8%
2010	15		15.4%
2020	11		−26.7%
U.S. Decennial Census

=== 2020 census ===
As of the census of 2020, there were 11 people, 0 households, and 0 families residing in the city. The population density was 28.9 inhabitants per square mile (11.2/km^{2}). There were 8 housing units at an average density of 21.0 per square mile (8.1/km^{2}). The racial makeup of the city was 63.6% White, 0.0% Black or African American, 0.0% Native American, 0.0% Asian, 0.0% Pacific Islander, 9.1% from other races and 27.3% from two or more races. Hispanic or Latino persons of any race comprised 0.0% of the population.

The median age in the city was 63.5 years. 0.0% of the residents were under the age of 20; 9.1% were between the ages of 20 and 24; 9.1% were from 25 and 44; 36.4% were from 45 and 64; and 45.5% were 65 years of age or older. The gender makeup of the city was 54.5% male and 45.5% female.

=== 2010 census ===
As of the census of 2010, there were 15 people, 8 households, and 3 families residing in the city. The population density was 45.5 inhabitants per square mile (17.6/km^{2}). There were 9 housing units at an average density of 27.3 per square mile (10.5/km^{2}). The racial makeup of the city was 93.3% White and 6.7% from two or more races.

There were 8 households, of which 12.5% had children under the age of 18 living with them, 12.5% were married couples living together, 25.0% had a male householder with no wife present, and 62.5% were non-families. 50.0% of all households were made up of individuals, and 12.5% had someone living alone who was 65 years of age or older. The average household size was 1.88 and the average family size was 2.33.

The median age in the city was 56.3 years. 13.3% of residents were under the age of 18; 0.1% were between the ages of 18 and 24; 26.7% were from 25 to 44; 40% were from 45 to 64; and 20% were 65 years of age or older. The gender makeup of the city was 40.0% male and 60.0% female.

=== 2000 census ===
As of the census of 2000, there were 13 people, 6 households, and 4 families residing in the city. The population density was 39.4 inhabitants per square mile (15.2/km^{2}). There were 15 housing units at an average density of 45.5 per square mile (17.6/km^{2}). The racial makeup of the city was 100.00% White.

There were 6 households, out of which 50.0% had children under the age of 18 living with them, 50.0% were married couples living together, 33.3% had a female householder with no husband present, and 16.7% were non-families. 16.7% of all households were made up of individuals, and none had someone living alone who was 65 years of age or older. The average household size was 2.17 and the average family size was 2.40.

In the city, the population was spread out, with 23.1% under the age of 18, 7.7% from 18 to 24, 53.8% from 45 to 64, and 15.4% who were 65 years of age or older. The median age was 50 years. For every 100 females, there were 62.5 males. For every 100 females age 18 and over, there were 66.7 males.

The median income for a household in the city was $33,125, and the median income for a family was $34,375. Males had a median income of $31,250 versus $0 for females. The per capita income for the city was $14,560. None of the population or families were below the poverty line.

== Education ==
Mormon Trail Community School District operates schools serving the community.
