= Thomas Cooper de Leon =

American journalist & author (1839–1914)

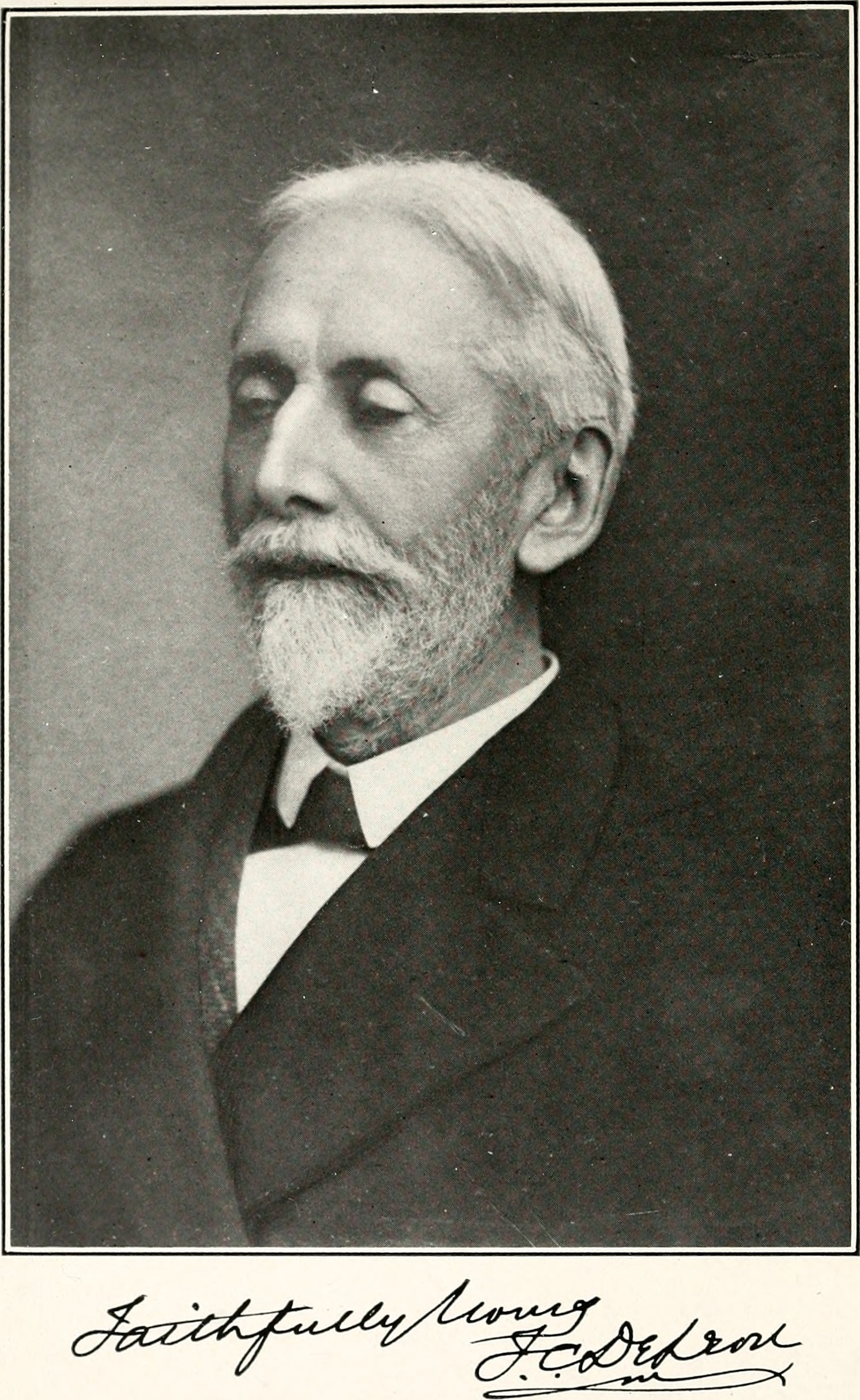

Thomas Cooper De Leon (May 21, 1839 – March 19, 1914) was an American journalist, author, and playwright.

== Biography ==
Born in Columbia, South Carolina, his parents were Mordecai Hendricks de Leon and Rebecca Lopez. His older brothers were the Confederate Surgeon-General David Camden de Leon and the writer and Confederate diplomat and propagandist Edwin de Leon. Thomas Cooper de Leon served in the Confederate army from 1861 to 1865, and after the Civil War he edited The Mobile Register, The Gossip, and the Gulf Citizen (both Mobile papers; 1873–96). For many years, he managed the Mobile Mardi Gras Carnival.

He was the author of a number of works, among them Creole and Puritan (1889), The Puritan's Daughter, and Four Years in Rebel Capitals (1893). He also wrote several plays, including the comedy-drama Pluck which was produced by Lawrence Barrett in 1873. He was totally blind from 1903 and henceforward known as "The Blind Laureate of the Lost Cause".

Thomas Cooper de Leon was named for the good friend of his father, the outspoken Thomas Cooper, president of the University of South Carolina. He was buried in Magnolia Cemetery, Mobile, Alabama.
