= Sarah Bond Hanley =

American politician (1865–1959)

Member of the Illinois House of Representatives from the 32nd district
- In office 1927–1931

Personal details
- Born: Sarah Helen Bond; January 1865 Leon, Iowa
- Died: April 15, 1959 (aged 94) Springfield, Illinois
- Party: Democratic
- Spouse: John Hanley (m. 1899)
- Children: Helen
- Education: Monmouth College

Sarah Helen Bond Hanley (January 1865 – April 15, 1959) was an American politician most notable for being one of the first two Democratic women to serve in the Illinois General Assembly.

== Biography ==
Sarah Helen Bond Hanley was born in Leon, Iowa, in 1865. She attended Monmouth College in Monmouth, Illinois. In 1889, she married attorney John H. Hanley with whom she would have one daughter, Helen. Her husband, a fellow Democratic activist, served as the Mayor of Monmouth from 1917 to 1921. Hanley was a member of the first Democratic Women's Club in the country, organized in 1888. During the 1892 election, Hanley, as an officer of the club, made the first monetary campaign contribution from a women's club to a political campaign. She served on the woman's auxiliary of the Democratic Party of Illinois. She campaigned for both Woodrow Wilson and James M. Cox. In 1921, she became the first woman to participate in a judicial convention. She was a member of the Illinois delegation to the 1924 Democratic National Convention.

In 1926, she and Mary C. McAdams of Quincy, Illinois, became the first two Democratic women elected to the Illinois General Assembly. Hanley was elected, unopposed, to represent the 32nd district alongside Republicans James H. Porter and Rollo R. Robbins. She took office on January 5, 1927. She served two terms, leaving the House in 1931.

In addition to her involvement in the Democratic Party, she was also active as a high-ranking member of the Daughters of the American Revolution. She died April 15, 1959, in Springfield, Illinois, at age 94.
