= Little Walnut Township, Kansas =

Little Walnut Township Butler County, Kansas
- Township
- Location within Butler County

- Location within Kansas
- Coordinates: 37°41′40″N 096°46′16″W
- Country: United States
- State: Kansas
- County: Butler

Area
  - Total: 36.37 sq mi (94.19 km^{2})
  - Land: 36.20 sq mi (93.77 km^{2})
  - Water: 0.16 sq mi (0.42 km^{2}) 0.45%
- Elevation: 1,352 ft (412 m)

Population (2000)
  - Total: 1,002
  - Density: 27.68/sq mi (10.69/km^{2})
- Time zone: UTC-6 (CST)
  - Summer (DST): UTC-5 (CDT)
- FIPS code: 20-41625
- GNIS ID: 474837
- Website: County website

Little Walnut Township is a township in Butler County, Kansas, United States. As of the 2000 census, its population was 1,002.

== History ==
Little Walnut Township was organized in 1877.

== Geography ==
Little Walnut Township covers an area of 36.37 square miles (94.2 km^{2}) and contains one incorporated settlement, Leon. The Leon town site was laid out and surveyed in November 1879. Its population as of 2010 was 704.

According to the USGS, the Little Walnut Township contains two cemeteries: Leon and Quito.

The streams of North Branch Little Walnut River and South Branch Little Walnut River run through this township.
