= Davis City, Iowa =

- City
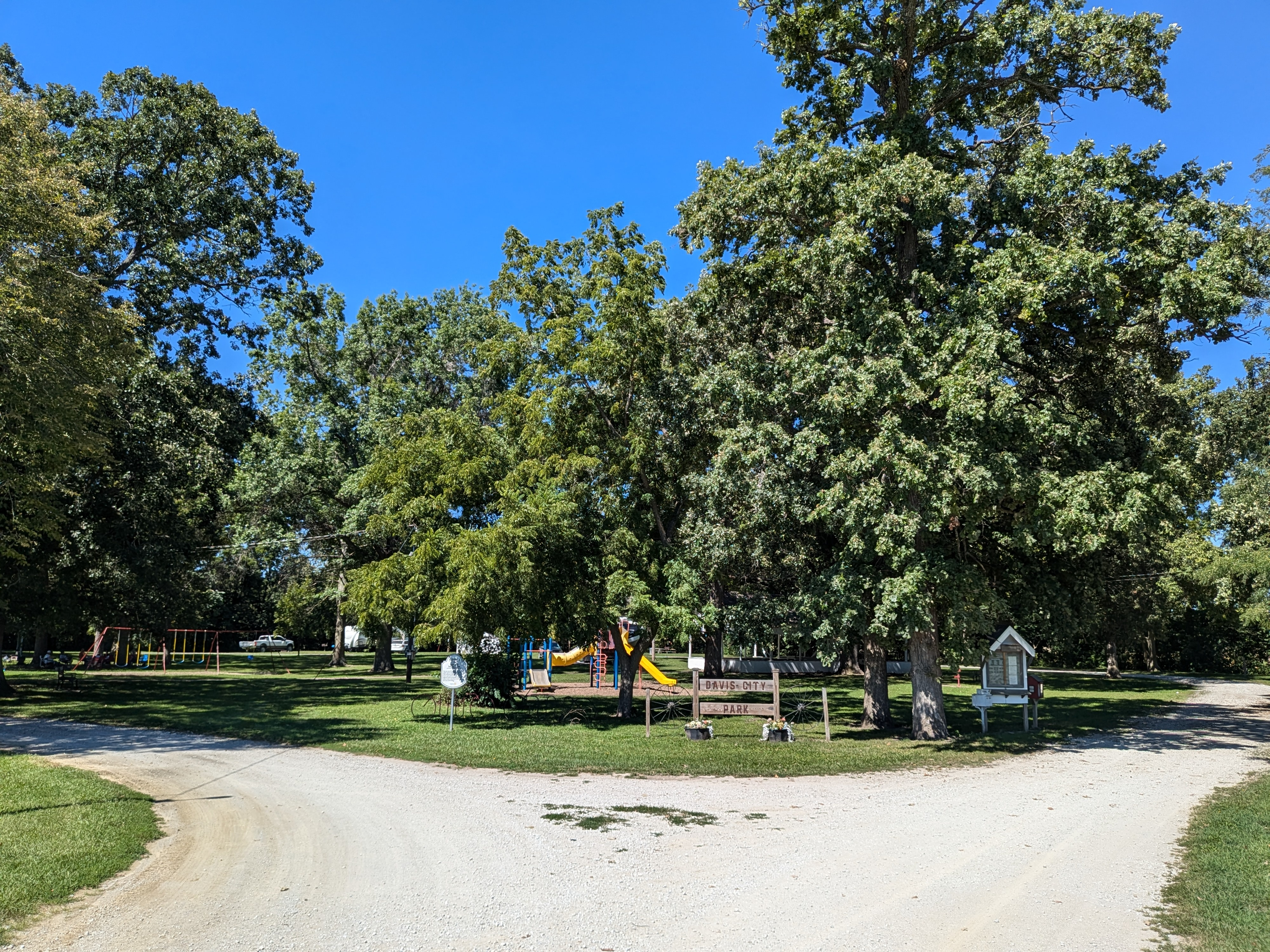
- The entrance to Davis City Park

- Location of Davis City, Iowa
- Coordinates: 40°38′24″N 93°48′45″W
- Country: USA
- State: Iowa
- County: Decatur

Area
  - Total: 0.58 sq mi (1.50 km^{2})
  - Land: 0.58 sq mi (1.50 km^{2})
  - Water: 0 sq mi (0.00 km^{2})
- Elevation: 958 ft (292 m)

Population (2020)
  - Total: 179
  - Density: 310/sq mi (119/km^{2})
- Time zone: UTC-6 (Central (CST))
  - Summer (DST): UTC-5 (CDT)
- ZIP code: 50065
- Area code: 641
- FIPS code: 19-19090
- GNIS feature ID: 2394468

Davis City is a city in Decatur County, Iowa, United States. The population was 179 at the time of the 2020 census.

== History ==
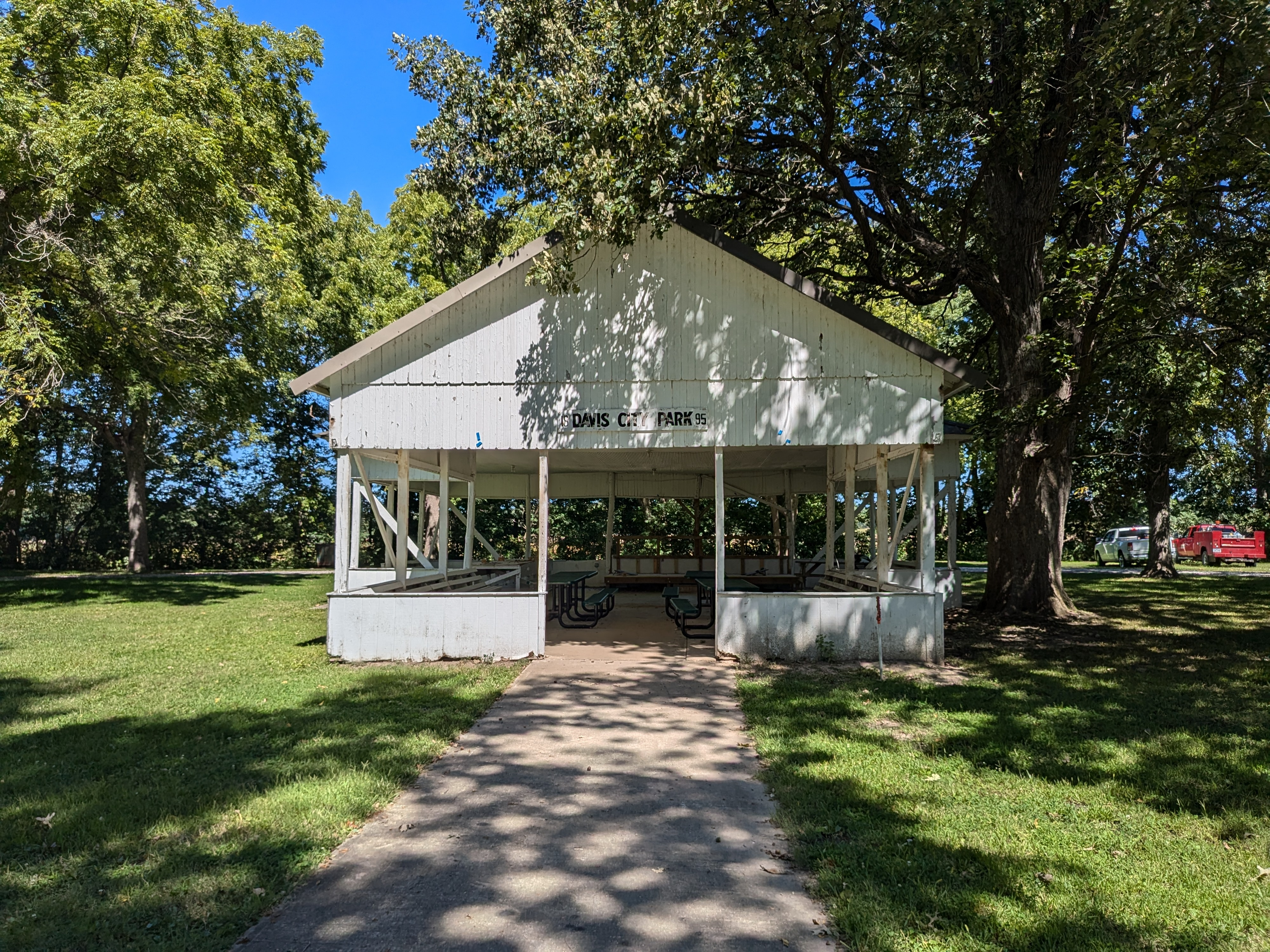
A pavilion in Davis City Park, built in 1895

Davis City was laid out in 1855. It is named for William Davis, who operated a sawmill. Davis City was a shipping point on the Chicago, Burlington and Quincy Railroad.

== Geography ==
Davis City is located along the Thompson River. A stream gauge station is maintained on the river in the city.

According to the United States Census Bureau, the city has a total area of 0.59 square miles (1.53 km^{2}), all land.

== Demographics ==
Historical populations
Year	Pop.	±%
1880	348	—
1890	594	+70.7%
1900	617	+3.9%
1910	489	−20.7%
1920	476	−2.7%
1930	548	+15.1%
1940	556	+1.5%
1950	432	−22.3%
1960	346	−19.9%
1970	301	−13.0%
1980	327	+8.6%
1990	257	−21.4%
2000	275	+7.0%
2010	204	−25.8%
2020	179	−12.3%
Source:"U.S. Census website". United States Census Bureau. and Iowa Data Center; Source: U.S. Decennial Census

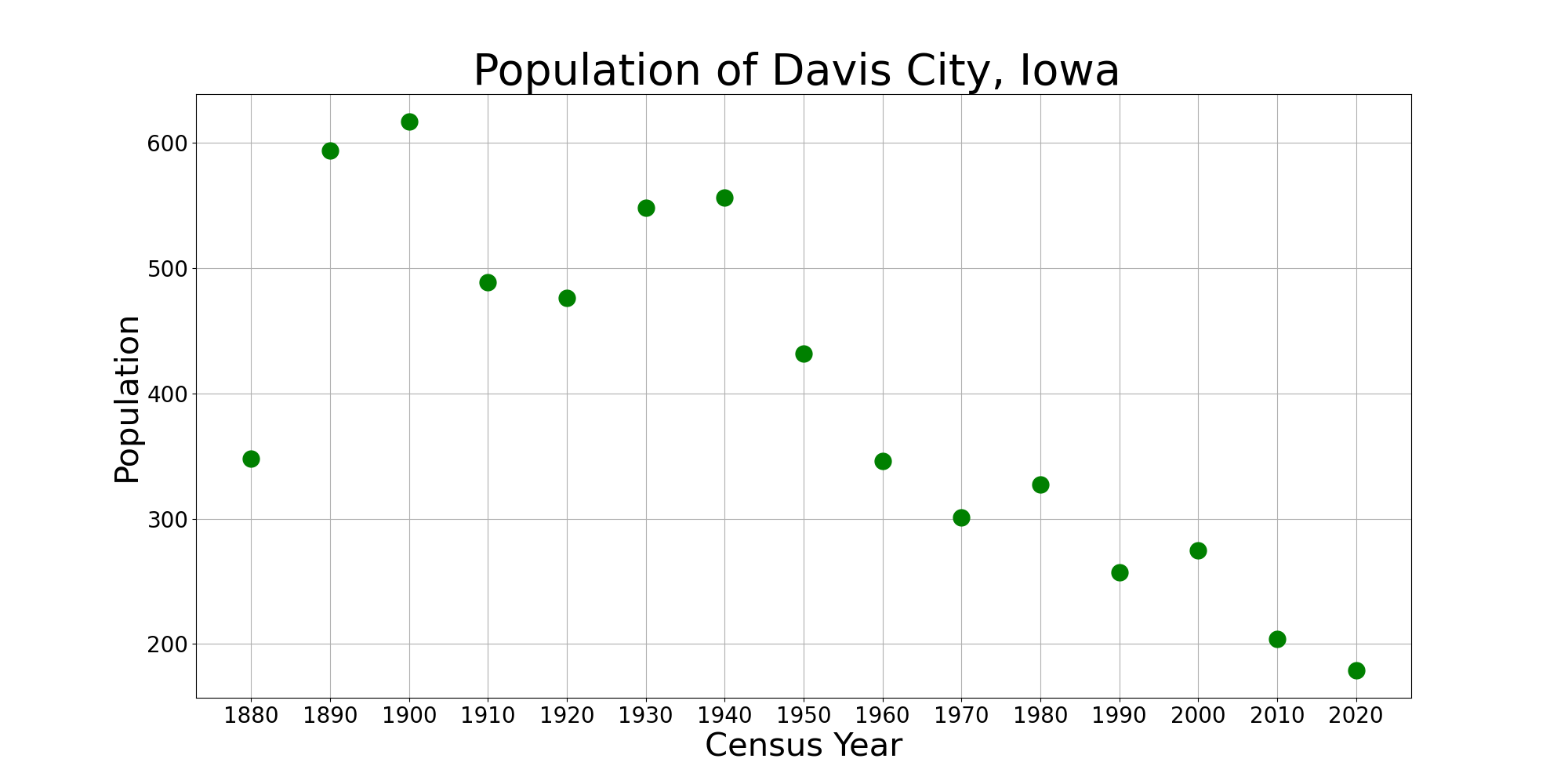
The population of Davis City, Iowa from US census data

=== 2020 census ===
As of the census of 2020, there were 179 people, 81 households, and 52 families residing in the city. The population density was 308.2 inhabitants per square mile (119.0/km^{2}). There were 116 housing units at an average density of 199.7 per square mile (77.1/km^{2}). The racial makeup of the city was 97.8% White, 0.0% Black or African American, 0.0% Native American, 0.0% Asian, 0.0% Pacific Islander, 0.6% from other races and 1.7% from two or more races. Hispanic or Latino persons of any race comprised 0.0% of the population.

Of the 81 households, 18.5% of which had children under the age of 18 living with them, 50.6% were married couples living together, 8.6% were cohabitating couples, 21.0% had a female householder with no spouse or partner present and 19.8% had a male householder with no spouse or partner present. 35.8% of all households were non-families. 30.9% of all households were made up of individuals, 17.3% had someone living alone who was 65 years old or older.

The median age in the city was 49.5 years. 18.4% of the residents were under the age of 20; 7.8% were between the ages of 20 and 24; 17.3% were from 25 and 44; 27.4% were from 45 and 64; and 29.1% were 65 years of age or older. The gender makeup of the city was 48.6% male and 51.4% female.

=== 2010 census ===
At the 2010 census there were 204 people in 94 households, including 53 families, in the city. The population density was 345.8 inhabitants per square mile (133.5/km^{2}). There were 121 housing units at an average density of 205.1 per square mile (79.2/km^{2}). The racial makup of the city was 98.0% White, 0.5% Native American, and 1.5% from two or more races. Hispanic or Latino of any race were 1.0%.

Of the 94 households 21.3% had children under the age of 18 living with them, 44.7% were married couples living together, 6.4% had a female householder with no husband present, 5.3% had a male householder with no wife present, and 43.6% were non-families. 36.2% of households were one person and 17% were one person aged 65 or older. The average household size was 2.12 and the average family size was 2.72.

The median age was 52 years. 18.1% of residents were under the age of 18; 6.9% were between the ages of 18 and 24; 17.2% were from 25 to 44; 28.4% were from 45 to 64; and 29.4% were 65 or older. The gender makeup of the city was 48.5% male and 51.5% female.

=== 2000 census ===
At the 2000 census there were 275 people in 109 households, including 79 families, in the city. The population density was 469.5 inhabitants per square mile (181.3/km^{2}). There were 125 housing units at an average density of 213.4 per square mile (82.4/km^{2}). The racial makup of the city was 98.55% White, 0.36% Native American, 0.73% from other races, and 0.36% from two or more races. Hispanic or Latino of any race were 1.45%.

Of the 109 households 33.9% had children under the age of 18 living with them, 54.1% were married couples living together, 11.0% had a female householder with no husband present, and 27.5% were non-families. 24.8% of households were one person and 10.1% were one person aged 65 or older. The average household size was 2.46 and the average family size was 2.86.

The age distribution was 27.6% under the age of 18, 5.8% from 18 to 24, 25.5% from 25 to 44, 24.0% from 45 to 64, and 17.1% 65 or older. The median age was 39 years. For every 100 females, there were 99.3 males. For every 100 females age 18 and over, there were 95.1 males.

The median household income was $23,750 and the median family income was $26,875. Males had a median income of $25,750 versus $19,250 for females. The per capita income for the city was $10,091. About 25.6% of families and 28.6% of the population were below the poverty line, including 30.4% of those under the age of eighteen and 23.1% of those sixty five or over.

== Education ==
The Central Decatur Community School District operates local area public schools.

== Transportation ==
While there is no fixed-route transit service in Davis City, intercity bus service is provided by Jefferson Lines in nearby Lamoni.
