= Pleasanton, Iowa =

- City
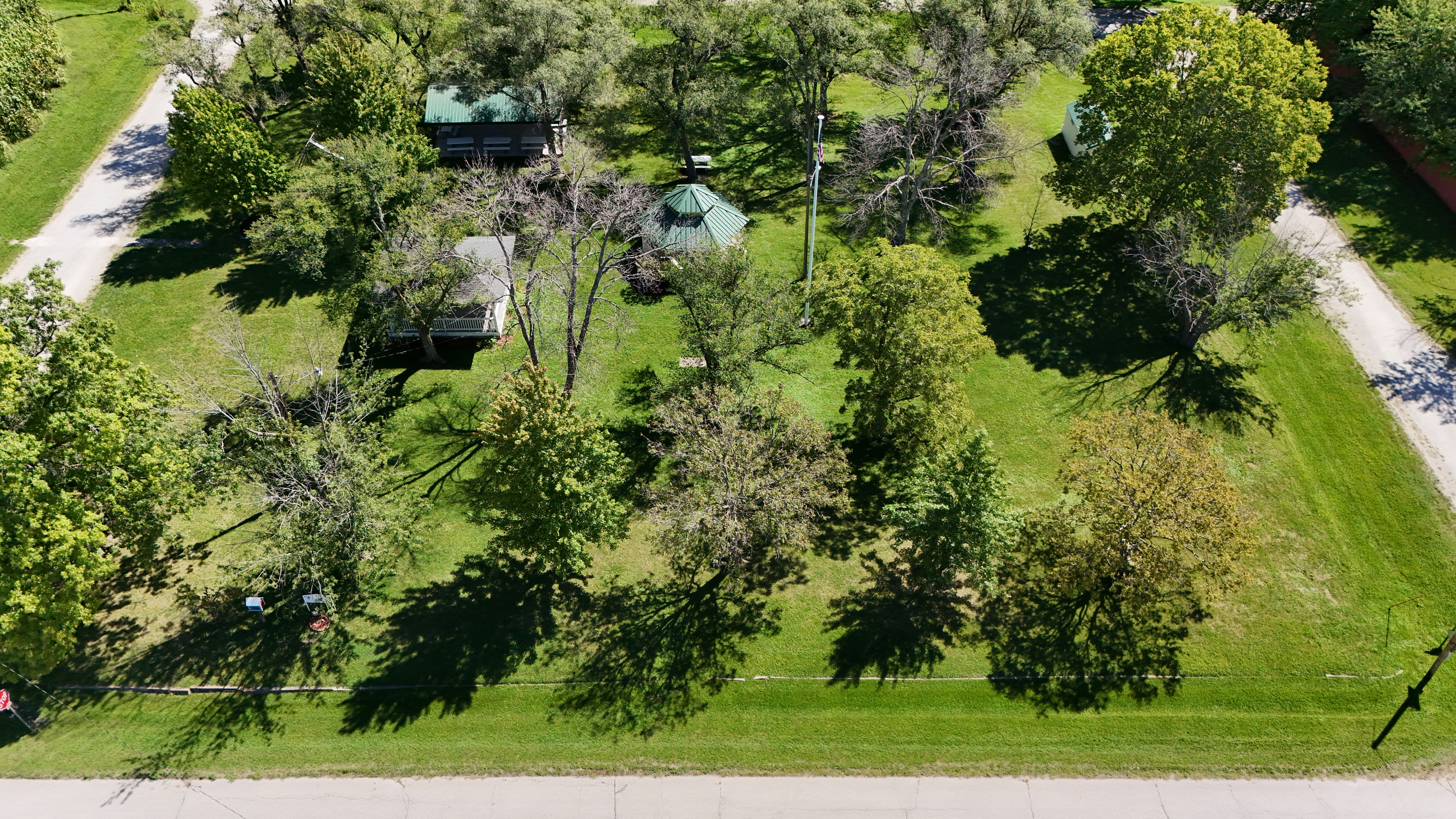
- A city park in Pleasanton

- Location of Pleasanton, Iowa
- Coordinates: 40°34′57″N 93°44′35″W
- Country: USA
- State: Iowa
- County: Decatur

Area
  - Total: 0.35 sq mi (0.91 km^{2})
  - Land: 0.35 sq mi (0.91 km^{2})
  - Water: 0 sq mi (0.00 km^{2})
- Elevation: 1,099 ft (335 m)

Population (2020)
  - Total: 32
  - Density: 91.2/sq mi (35.21/km^{2})
- Time zone: UTC-6 (Central (CST))
  - Summer (DST): UTC-5 (CDT)
- ZIP code: 50065/50224
- Area code: 641
- FIPS code: 19-63570
- GNIS feature ID: 2396235

Pleasanton is a city in Decatur County, Iowa, United States. The population was 32 at the time of the 2020 census.

== History ==
Pleasanton was founded in 1854. It was originally called Pleasant Plain, but the name was changed to avoid confusion with another community of that same name in the state. The present name is commendatory.

== Geography ==
According to the United States Census Bureau, the city has a total area of 0.35 square miles (0.91 km^{2}), all land.

== Demographics ==
Historical populations
Year	Pop.	±%
1880	117	—
1900	164	+40.2%
1910	200	+22.0%
1920	266	+33.0%
1930	177	−33.5%
1940	180	+1.7%
1950	130	−27.8%
1960	103	−20.8%
1970	62	−39.8%
1980	75	+21.0%
1990	58	−22.7%
2000	37	−36.2%
2010	49	+32.4%
2020	32	−34.7%
Source:"U.S. Census website". United States Census Bureau. and Iowa Data Center; Source: U.S. Decennial Census

=== 2020 census ===
As of the census of 2020, there were 32 people, 18 households, and 13 families residing in the city. The population density was 91.2 inhabitants per square mile (35.2/km^{2}). There were 18 housing units at an average density of 51.3 per square mile (19.8/km^{2}). The racial makeup of the city was 100.0% White, 0.0% Black or African American, 0.0% Native American, 0.0% Asian, 0.0% Pacific Islander, 0.0% from other races and 0.0% from two or more races. Hispanic or Latino persons of any race comprised 0.0% of the population.

Of the 18 households, 44.4% of which had children under the age of 18 living with them, 61.1% were married couples living together, 5.6% were cohabitating couples, 11.1% had a female householder with no spouse or partner present and 22.2% had a male householder with no spouse or partner present. 27.8% of all households were non-families. 16.7% of all households were made up of individuals, 5.6% had someone living alone who was 65 years old or older.

The median age in the city was 55.0 years. 15.6% of the residents were under the age of 20; 6.2% were between the ages of 20 and 24; 21.9% were from 25 and 44; 34.4% were from 45 and 64; and 21.9% were 65 years of age or older. The gender makeup of the city was 50.0% male and 50.0% female.

=== 2010 census ===
As of the census of 2010, there were 49 people, 18 households, and 14 families living in the city. The population density was 140.0 inhabitants per square mile (54.1/km^{2}). There were 26 housing units at an average density of 74.3 per square mile (28.7/km^{2}). The racial makeup of the city was 100.0% White.

There were 18 households, of which 27.8% had children under the age of 18 living with them, 66.7% were married couples living together, 11.1% had a female householder with no husband present, and 22.2% were non-families. 22.2% of all households were made up of individuals. The average household size was 2.72 and the average family size was 3.07.

The median age in the city was 34.5 years. 28.6% of residents were under the age of 18; 4.2% were between the ages of 18 and 24; 22.4% were from 25 to 44; 24.4% were from 45 to 64; and 20.4% were 65 years of age or older. The gender makeup of the city was 55.1% male and 44.9% female.

=== 2000 census ===
As of the census of 2000, there were 37 people, 20 households, and 12 families living in the city. The population density was 107.6 inhabitants per square mile (41.5/km^{2}). There were 24 housing units at an average density of 69.8 per square mile (26.9/km^{2}). The racial makeup of the city was 100.00% White.

There were 20 households, out of which 15.0% had children under the age of 18 living with them, 55.0% were married couples living together, 5.0% had a female householder with no husband present, and 40.0% were non-families. 40.0% of all households were made up of individuals, and 25.0% had someone living alone who was 65 years of age or older. The average household size was 1.85 and the average family size was 2.42.

In the city, the population was spread out, with 10.8% under the age of 18, 8.1% from 18 to 24, 13.5% from 25 to 44, 35.1% from 45 to 64, and 32.4% who were 65 years of age or older. The median age was 58 years. For every 100 females, there were 105.6 males. For every 100 females age 18 and over, there were 94.1 males.

The median income for a household in the city was $51,250, and the median income for a family was $54,375. Males had a median income of $51,250 versus $18,750 for females. The per capita income for the city was $29,231. There were no families and 12.5% of the population living below the poverty line, including no under eighteens and 16.7% of those over 64.

== Education ==
The Central Decatur Community School District operates local area public schools.

== Transportation ==
While there is no fixed-route transit service in Pleasanton, intercity bus service is provided by Jefferson Lines in nearby Lamoni.
