= Leon, Iowa =

- City
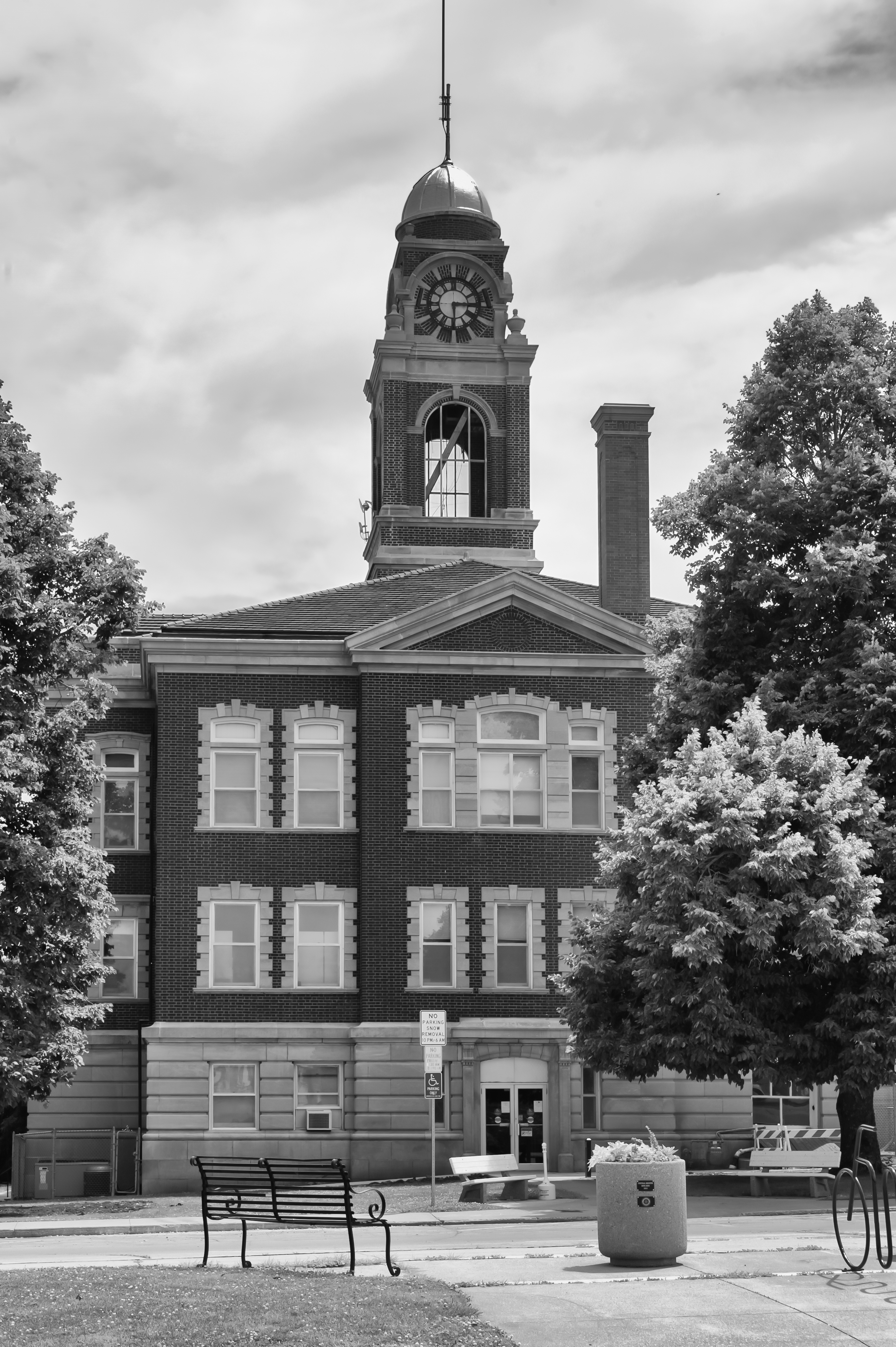
- Decatur County Courthouse in Leon

- Location of Leon, Iowa
- Coordinates: 40°44′24″N 93°44′47″W
- Country: United States
- State: Iowa
- County: Decatur

Area
  - Total: 3.14 sq mi (8.13 km^{2})
  - Land: 3.13 sq mi (8.11 km^{2})
  - Water: 0.0077 sq mi (0.02 km^{2})
- Elevation: 1,047 ft (319 m)

Population (2020)
  - Total: 1,822
  - Density: 582/sq mi (224.6/km^{2})
- Time zone: UTC-6 (Central (CST))
  - Summer (DST): UTC-5 (CDT)
- ZIP code: 50144
- Area code: 641
- FIPS code: 19-44535
- GNIS feature ID: 0468204
- Website: www.cityofleoniowa.com

Leon is a city in and the county seat of Decatur County, Iowa, United States. The population was 1,822 at the time of the 2020 census.

The city is located near the Little River Lake Recreation Area. Leon is home to a major rodeo that has been Rodeo of the Year in Iowa for many years.

== History ==
Center Township was organized as part of the formation of the county on 1 April 1850. Because Decatur City was inaccessible to the rest of the county during the area's periodic floods, a majority of the county voted to move the county seat to a nearby location east of the Little River. Because the residents of Decatur City refused to respect the results of the vote, the county records were stolen and moved by ox-drawn wagon under cover of darkness. The new settlement was originally named Independence, but that name was soon discovered to have already been taken by another town in Buchanan County. It was then renamed South Independence before the state legislator and veteran W.H. Cheevers successfully argued for renaming it Leon in honor of the Jewish "Fighting Doctor" David Camden de Leon in 1855.

It was formally incorporated as a city in 1858, which politically separated the community from Center Township. It was a shipping point on the Chicago, Burlington and Quincy Railroad.

== Geography ==
Leon is located on US Route 69 and Iowa Highway 2 approximately 12 miles northeast of Lamoni.

According to the United States Census Bureau, the city has a total area of 3.18 square miles (8.24 km^{2}), of which, 3.17 square miles (8.21 km^{2}) is land and 0.01 square miles (0.03 km^{2}) is water.

=== Climate ===
According to the Köppen Climate Classification system, Leon has a hot-summer humid continental climate, abbreviated "Dfa" on climate maps.

Climate data for Leon, Iowa, 1991–2020 normals, extremes 1902–2012
Month	Jan	Feb	Mar	Apr	May	Jun	Jul	Aug	Sep	Oct	Nov	Dec	Year
Record high °F (°C)	66 (19)	75 (24)	87 (31)	92 (33)	91 (33)	107 (42)	109 (43)	107 (42)	102 (39)	95 (35)	80 (27)	68 (20)	109 (43)
Mean maximum °F (°C)	55.2 (12.9)	61.6 (16.4)	75.4 (24.1)	83.2 (28.4)	86.2 (30.1)	91.4 (33.0)	95.9 (35.5)	95.8 (35.4)	89.8 (32.1)	83.1 (28.4)	70.3 (21.3)	58.3 (14.6)	97.5 (36.4)
Mean daily maximum °F (°C)	32.7 (0.4)	37.6 (3.1)	50.4 (10.2)	62.5 (16.9)	71.9 (22.2)	80.8 (27.1)	85.5 (29.7)	83.6 (28.7)	76.0 (24.4)	64.2 (17.9)	49.8 (9.9)	37.7 (3.2)	61.1 (16.1)
Daily mean °F (°C)	22.6 (−5.2)	26.7 (−2.9)	38.7 (3.7)	49.6 (9.8)	60.1 (15.6)	69.7 (20.9)	74.2 (23.4)	72.0 (22.2)	63.2 (17.3)	51.6 (10.9)	38.9 (3.8)	27.8 (−2.3)	49.6 (9.8)
Mean daily minimum °F (°C)	12.6 (−10.8)	15.7 (−9.1)	27.0 (−2.8)	36.8 (2.7)	48.3 (9.1)	58.5 (14.7)	62.8 (17.1)	60.5 (15.8)	50.4 (10.2)	38.9 (3.8)	27.9 (−2.3)	17.8 (−7.9)	38.1 (3.4)
Mean minimum °F (°C)	−9.9 (−23.3)	−7.3 (−21.8)	6.7 (−14.1)	19.9 (−6.7)	32.5 (0.3)	43.0 (6.1)	50.7 (10.4)	47.9 (8.8)	32.5 (0.3)	22.1 (−5.5)	10.4 (−12.0)	−6.5 (−21.4)	−16.6 (−27.0)
Record low °F (°C)	−30 (−34)	−36 (−38)	−21 (−29)	7 (−14)	23 (−5)	35 (2)	44 (7)	35 (2)	22 (−6)	13 (−11)	−12 (−24)	−33 (−36)	−36 (−38)
Average precipitation inches (mm)	0.90 (23)	1.51 (38)	2.29 (58)	3.80 (97)	5.54 (141)	5.56 (141)	4.43 (113)	4.54 (115)	4.17 (106)	3.17 (81)	2.07 (53)	1.35 (34)	39.33 (1,000)
Average snowfall inches (cm)	8.0 (20)	6.0 (15)	4.9 (12)	0.1 (0.25)	0.0 (0.0)	0.0 (0.0)	0.0 (0.0)	0.0 (0.0)	0.0 (0.0)	0.2 (0.51)	1.5 (3.8)	7.8 (20)	28.5 (71.56)
Average precipitation days (≥ 0.01 in)	6.0	7.1	9.0	11.5	14.3	12.9	10.6	9.9	8.3	9.0	7.4	6.7	112.7
Average snowy days (≥ 0.1 in)	5.0	4.7	2.0	0.5	0.0	0.0	0.0	0.0	0.0	0.1	1.3	4.3	17.9
Source 1: NOAA
Source 2: National Weather Service (mean maxima and minima 1981–2010)

== Demographics ==
Historical population
Year	Pop.	±%
1870	820	—
1880	1,367	+66.7%
1890	1,422	+4.0%
1900	1,905	+34.0%
1910	1,991	+4.5%
1920	2,193	+10.1%
1930	2,006	−8.5%
1940	2,307	+15.0%
1950	2,139	−7.3%
1960	2,004	−6.3%
1970	2,142	+6.9%
1980	2,094	−2.2%
1990	2,047	−2.2%
2000	1,982	−3.2%
2010	1,977	−0.3%
2020	1,822	−7.8%
Source: "U.S. Census website". United States Census Bureau. Source: U.S. Decennial Census

=== 2020 census ===
As of the 2020 census, Leon had a population of 1,822 and 457 families residing in the city. The population density was 581.7 inhabitants per square mile (224.6/km^{2}). There were 871 housing units at an average density of 278.1 per square mile (107.4/km^{2}).

The median age was 39.1 years. 26.2% of residents were under the age of 20, 24.5% were under the age of 18, and 22.2% were 65 years of age or older. 6.3% of residents were between the ages of 20 and 24, 22.9% were from 25 to 44, and 22.4% were from 45 to 64. The gender makeup of the city was 48.2% male and 51.8% female. For every 100 females there were 93.0 males, and for every 100 females age 18 and over there were 90.8 males age 18 and over.

0.0% of residents lived in urban areas, while 100.0% lived in rural areas.

Of the city's 743 households, 29.5% had children under the age of 18 living with them. Of all households, 42.9% were married-couple households, 7.5% were cohabitating-couple households, 19.0% had a male householder with no spouse or partner present, and 30.6% had a female householder with no spouse or partner present. About 38.5% of households were non-families, 31.9% were made up of individuals, and 16.4% had someone living alone who was 65 years of age or older.

Of housing units, 14.7% were vacant. The homeowner vacancy rate was 5.1% and the rental vacancy rate was 10.9%.

Racial composition as of the 2020 census
Race	Number	Percent
White	1,725	94.7%
Black or African American	10	0.5%
American Indian and Alaska Native	1	0.1%
Asian	4	0.2%
Native Hawaiian and Other Pacific Islander	3	0.2%
Some other race	18	1.0%
Two or more races	61	3.3%
Hispanic or Latino (of any race)	34	1.9%

=== 2010 census ===
As of the census of 2010, there were 1,977 people, 826 households, and 482 families living in the city. The population density was 623.7 inhabitants per square mile (240.8/km^{2}). There were 952 housing units at an average density of 300.3 per square mile (115.9/km^{2}). The racial makeup of the city was 98.1% White, 0.7% African American, 0.3% Native American, 0.6% Asian, 0.2% from other races, and 0.3% from two or more races. Hispanic or Latino of any race were 2.0% of the population.

There were 826 households, of which 28.5% had children under the age of 18 living with them, 42.1% were married couples living together, 12.3% had a female householder with no husband present, 3.9% had a male householder with no wife present, and 41.6% were non-families. 36.9% of all households were made up of individuals, and 18.3% had someone living alone who was 65 years of age or older. The average household size was 2.32 and the average family size was 3.08.

The median age in the city was 40.2 years. 25.3% of residents were under the age of 18; 8.2% were between the ages of 18 and 24; 21.3% were from 25 to 44; 24.9% were from 45 to 64; and 20.4% were 65 years of age or older. The gender makeup of the city was 47.4% male and 52.6% female.

=== 2000 census ===
As of the census of 2000, there were 1,983 people, 858 households, and 513 families living in the city. The population density was 630.9 inhabitants per square mile (243.6/km^{2}). There were 966 housing units at an average density of 307.3 per square mile (118.6/km^{2}). The racial makeup of the city was 98.64% White, 0.10% African American, 0.20% Native American, 0.50% Asian, 0.05% from other races, and 0.50% from two or more races. Hispanic or Latino of any race were 1.56% of the population.

There were 858 households, out of which 29.5% had children under the age of 18 living with them, 45.7% were married couples living together, 10.7% had a female householder with no husband present, and 40.1% were non-families. 36.8% of all households were made up of individuals, and 20.6% had someone living alone who was 65 years of age or older. The average household size was 2.23 and the average family size was 2.90.

Age spread: 24.7% under the age of 18, 7.8% from 18 to 24, 24.0% from 25 to 44, 20.5% from 45 to 64, and 23.0% who were 65 years of age or older. The median age was 40 years. For every 100 females, there were 85.0 males. For every 100 females age 18 and over, there were 77.9 males.

The median income for a household in the city was $24,390, and the median income for a family was $33,083. Males had a median income of $24,100 versus $18,849 for females. The per capita income for the city was $13,015. About 12.7% of families and 16.6% of the population were below the poverty line, including 20.9% of those under age 18 and 16.0% of those age 65 or over.

== Chamber of Commerce ==
=== Chamber history ===
On January 15, 1888, a meeting of the business men of Leon was held at the Courthouse at which steps were taken towards organizing a business men's association. At this meeting a committee was appointed for the purpose of drawing up a plan of organization. At a second meeting, the committee recommended that an association be formed at once under the name of the Leon Board of Trade. The shares of stock were fixed at $5 each, and each member of the board was required to take not less than one share of the stock. The constitution and by-laws were at once circulated for signatures, and within 15 minutes thirty of the business men of the town had signified their intention of becoming members of the board. The Board of Trade existed successfully and helpfully for a number of years.

The Leon Commercial Club was established on April 26, 1907. The object of the club was to promote the civic and industrial interests of the city and to place Leon on equal footing with similarly sized cities in the State. The officers were: James F. Harvey - President A.L. Ackerly - Vice President William J Springer - Secretary CW Robinson - Treasurer.

Today this organization is known as the Leon Chamber of Commerce. Current membership consists of 58 business members and a number of private, individual members. The purpose of this organization is to unite into one central organization all of the civic, industrial and commercial activities of this community, To aid, encourage and promote the best interests of the City of Leon and the County of Decatur, To acquire real and personal property, to mortgage, lease and dispose of same, To do any and all things permitted by law for a non-profit corporation, and to exercise any and all powers and privileges permitted by law concerning the same.

In 2013, the Leon Chamber of Commerce and the Leon Community Development Corporation (LCDC) were merged into one organization. Leon Chamber of Commerce remained and LCDC become a subcommittee of the Leon Chamber of Commerce.

== Education ==
The Central Decatur Community School District operates local area public schools.

== Notable residents ==
- Steven V. Carter (1915–1959), U.S. Representative from Iowa
- Sarah Bond Hanley (1865–1959), Illinois state representative
- John Clinton Porter (1871–1959), mayor of Los Angeles

== See also ==
- Central Decatur Junior - Senior High School
- Decatur County Courthouse (Iowa), listed on the National Register of Historic Places
