= Decatur County Courthouse (Iowa) =

- U.S. National Register of Historic Places
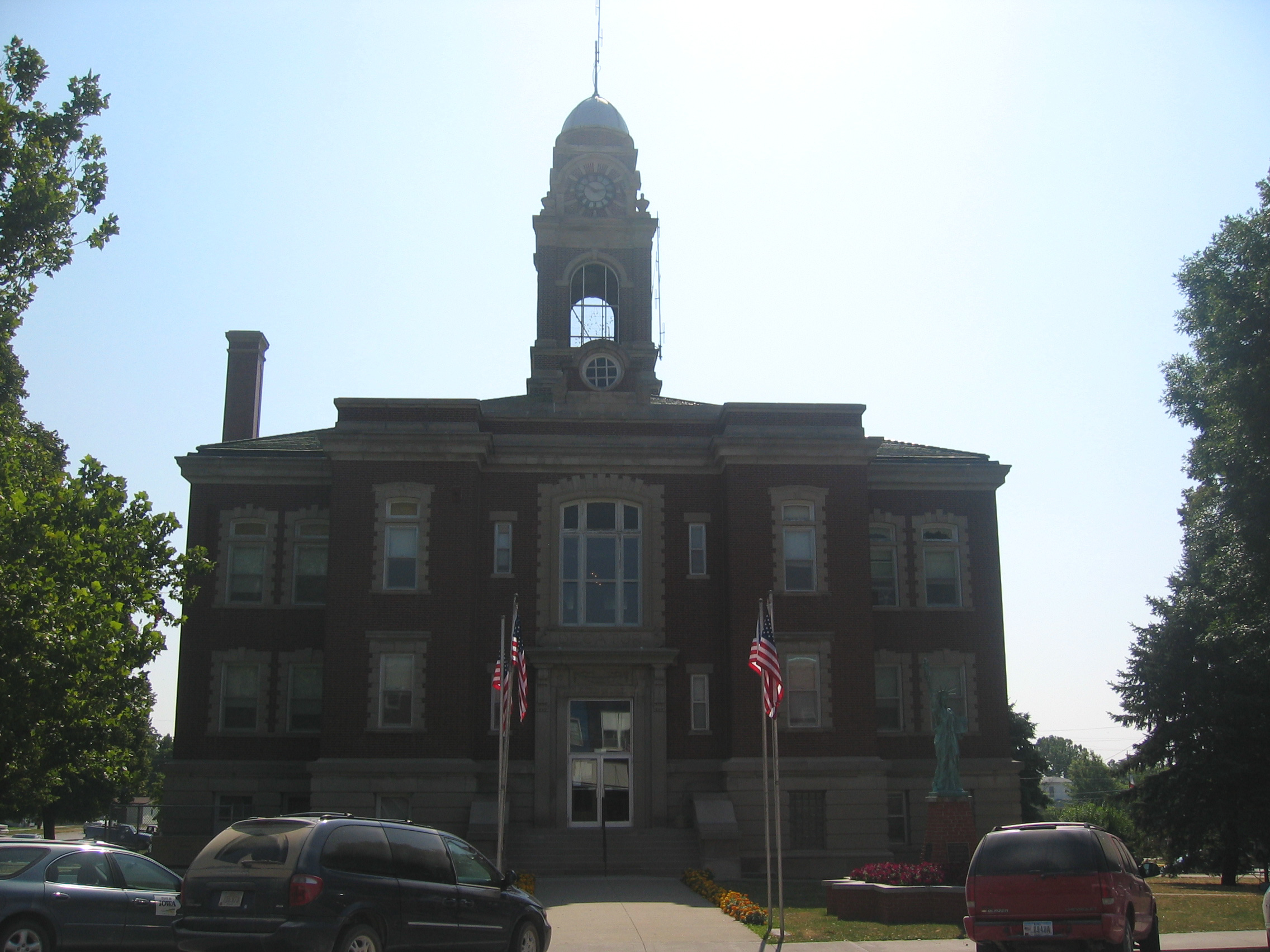
- The Decatur County courthouse in Leon

- Location within Iowa Location within the United States
- Interactive map showing the location for Decatur County Courthouse
- Location: 9th St. Leon, Iowa
- Coordinates: 40°44′26″N 93°44′46″W
- Area: less than one acre
- Built: 1908
- Architect: Smith, Wetherell and Gage
- Architectural style: Renaissance Revival
- MPS: County Courthouses in Iowa TR
- NRHP reference No.: 81000233
- Added to NRHP: July 2, 1981

The Decatur County Courthouse, located in Leon, Iowa, United States, was built in 1908. It was listed on the National Register of Historic Places in 1981 as a part of the County Courthouses in Iowa Thematic Resource. The courthouse is the sixth building the county has used for court functions and county administration.

== History ==
The first courthouse in Decatur County was a log structure built in Leon in for $375. The county soon outgrew the building and it became a hotel. It was replaced by a small structure that was declared unusable soon after it was built. The next courthouse was destroyed in a windstorm before it was finished, and a fire destroyed the fourth courthouse along with the county records. The fifth courthouse was a brick structure that was built for $20,000. In 1876, thieves attempted to open the county treasurer's safe and when they set off explosives they blew up that side of the building, but were unable to crack the safe. The building was rebuilt and served as the county courthouse until the present building replaced it in 1908.

The present courthouse is a two-story structure built over a raised basement. The main floors are clad in brick and the foundation is stone. The Des Moines architectural firm of Smith, Wetherell and Gage designed the Renaissance Revival building. The central clock tower is its prominent feature. The modified Gibbs surrounds around the second and third floor windows is another defining feature. Iron, stone, steel, tile, brick, marble, and granite were all used in its construction so as to protect it from fire, wind, and any other malady. The courthouse's significance is derived from its association with county government, and the political power and prestige of Leon as the county seat.
