= Decatur County, Iowa =

County in Iowa, United States

- County
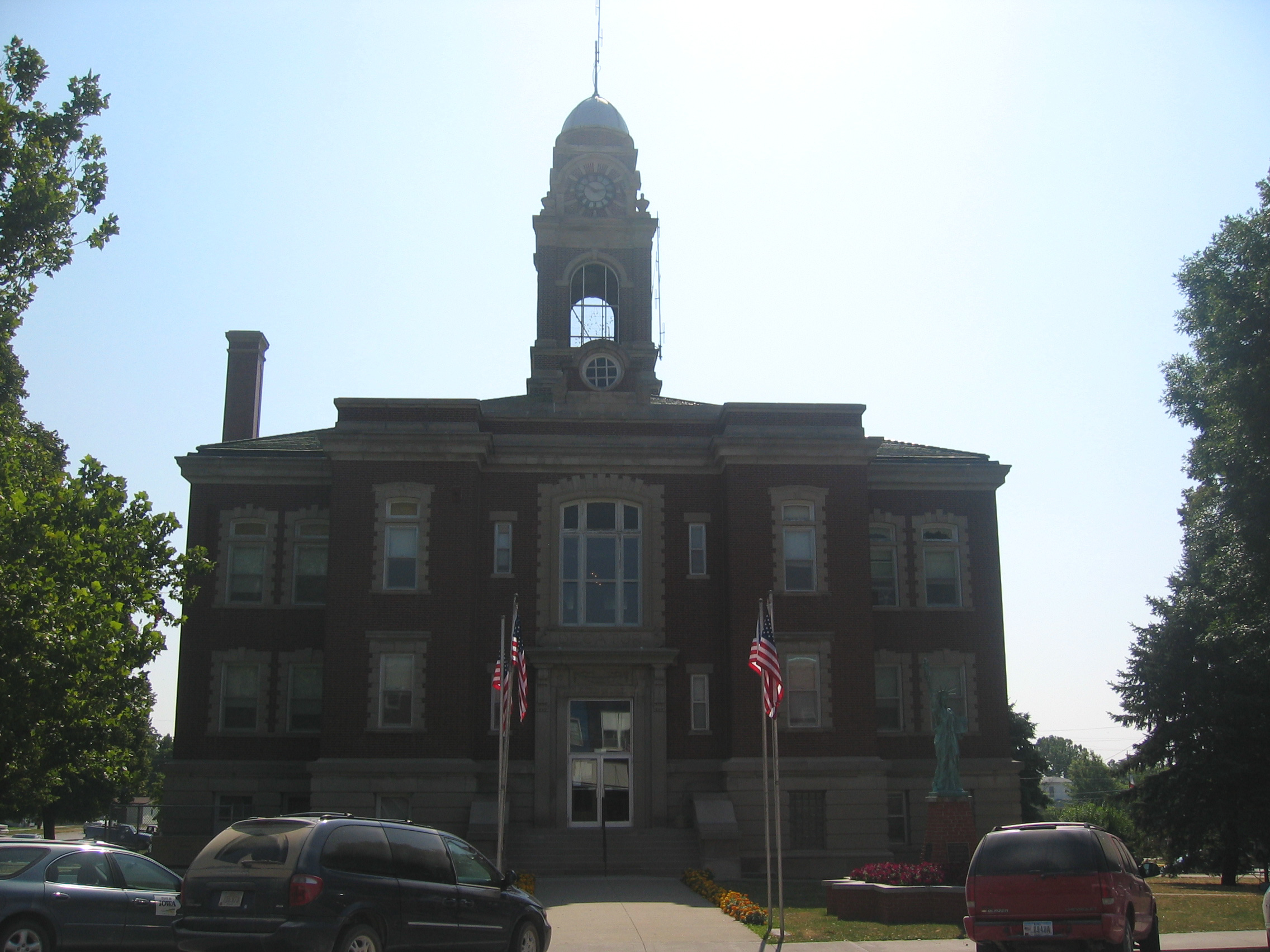
- The Decatur County Courthouse in Leon

- Location within the U.S. state of Iowa
- Coordinates: 40°44′29″N 93°46′51″W
- Country: United States
- State: Iowa
- Founded: January 13, 1846 (created); May 6, 1850 (organized)
- Named for: Stephen Decatur Jr.
- Seat: Leon
- Largest city: Lamoni

Area
  - Total: 533 sq mi (1,380 km^{2})
  - Land: 532 sq mi (1,380 km^{2})
  - Water: 1.6 sq mi (4.1 km^{2}) 0.3%

Population (2020)
  - Total: 7,645
  - Estimate (2025): 7,655 ▲
  - Density: 14.4/sq mi (5.55/km^{2})
- Time zone: UTC−6 (Central)
  - Summer (DST): UTC−5 (CDT)
- Congressional district: 3rd
- Website: www.decaturcountyiowa.gov
- Iowa county number 27

Decatur County (/dɪˈkeɪtər/) is a county located in the U.S. state of Iowa. As of the 2020 census, the population was 7,645. The county seat is Leon. This county is named for Stephen Decatur Jr., a hero in the War of 1812.

== History ==
Decatur County was organized in 1850 and named for Stephen Decatur, a naval hero of the War of 1812. The current courthouse was dedicated in 1908.

== Geography ==
According to the U.S. Census Bureau, the county has a total area of 533 square miles (1,380 km^{2}), of which 532 square miles (1,380 km^{2}) is land and 1.6 square miles (4.1 km^{2}) (0.3%) is water.

Soils of Decatur County

=== Major highways ===
- Interstate 35
- U.S. Highway 69
- Iowa Highway 2

=== Transit ===
- Jefferson Lines

=== Adjacent counties ===
- Clarke County (north)
- Wayne County (east)
- Mercer County, Missouri (southeast)
- Harrison County, Missouri (southwest)
- Ringgold County (west)

== Demographics ==
Historical population
Census	Pop.	Note	%±
1850	965		—
1860	8,677		799.2%
1870	12,018		38.5%
1880	15,336		27.6%
1890	15,643		2.0%
1900	18,115		15.8%
1910	16,347		−9.8%
1920	16,566		1.3%
1930	14,903		−10.0%
1940	14,012		−6.0%
1950	12,601		−10.1%
1960	10,539		−16.4%
1970	9,737		−7.6%
1980	9,794		0.6%
1990	8,338		−14.9%
2000	8,689		4.2%
2010	8,457		−2.7%
2020	7,645		−9.6%
2025 (est.)	7,655	▲	0.1%
U.S. Decennial Census; 1790–1960 1900–90; 1990–00 2010–20

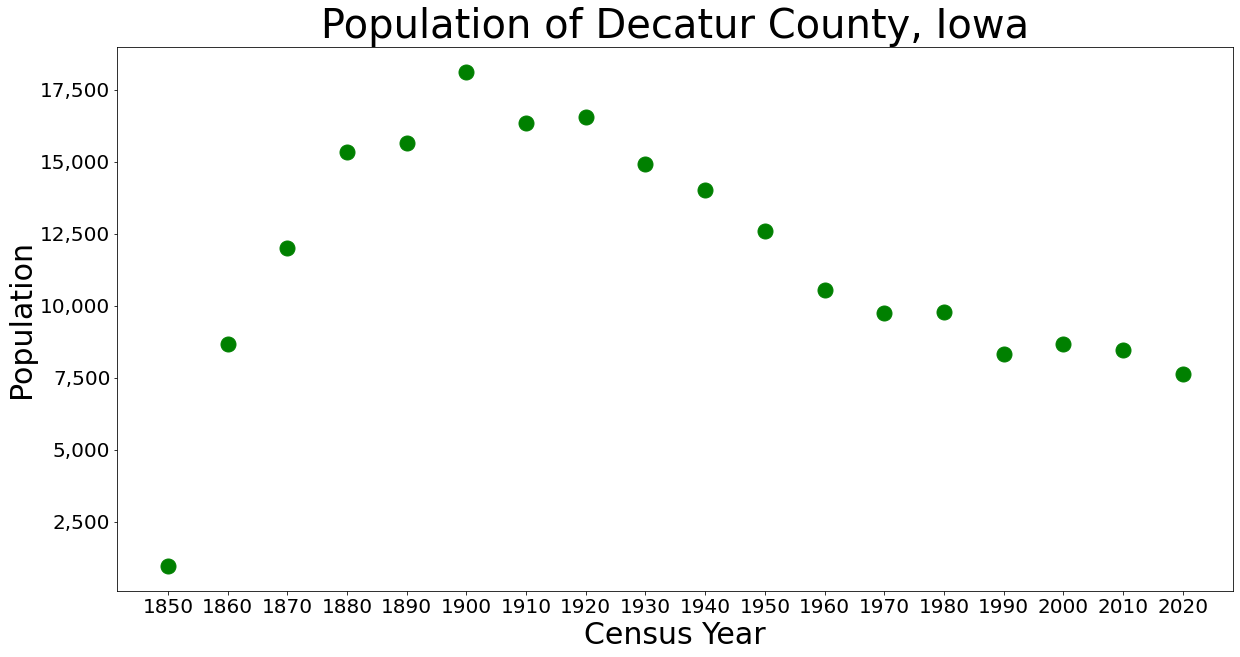
Population of Decatur County from US census data

=== 2020 census ===
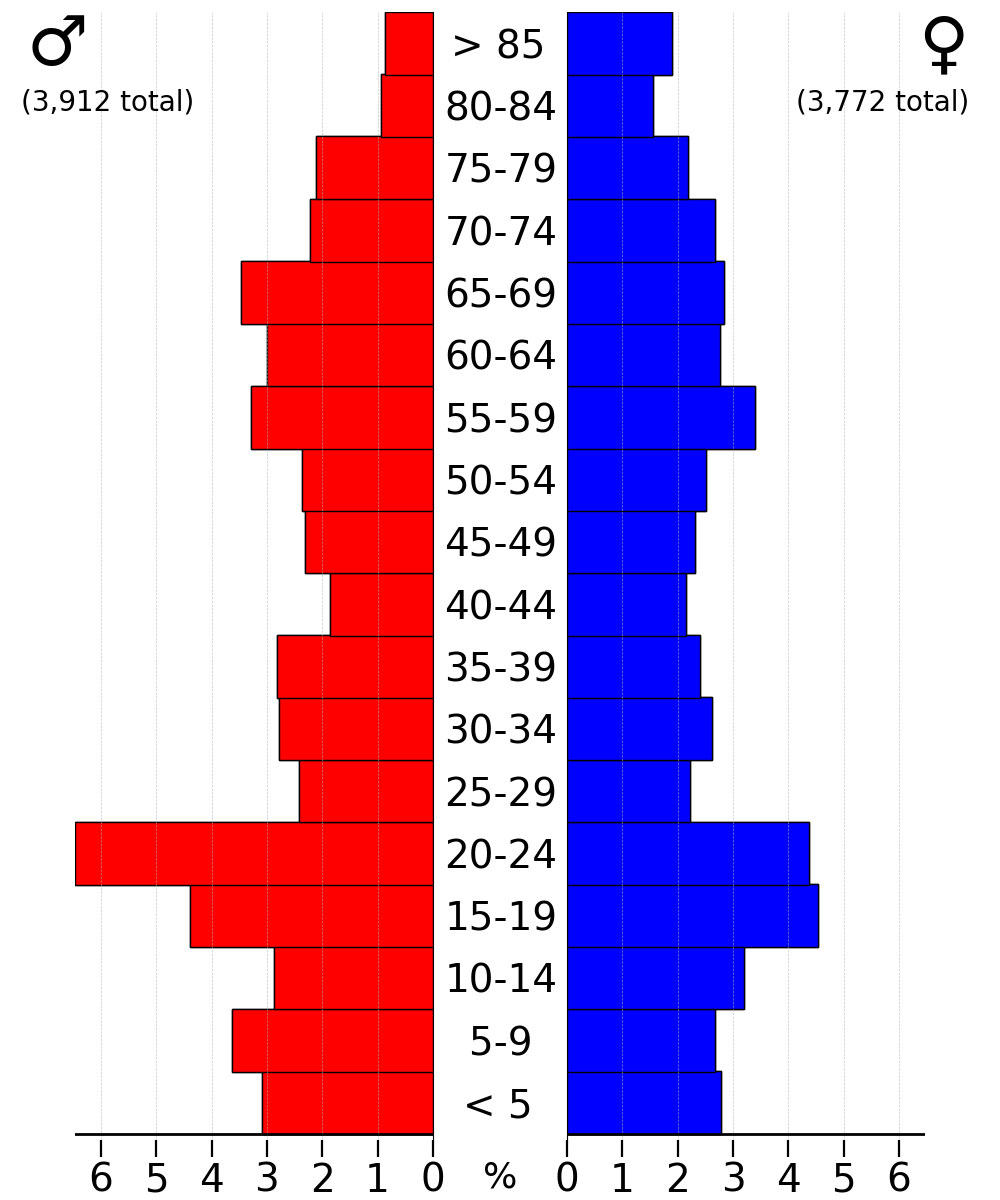
2022 US Census population pyramid for Decatur County from ACS 5-year estimates

As of the 2020 census, the county had a population of 7,645, which produced a population density of 14.3/sq mi (5.5/km^{2}). The median age was 39.5 years. 23.2% of residents were under the age of 18 and 21.0% of residents were 65 years of age or older. For every 100 females there were 100.2 males, and for every 100 females age 18 and over there were 98.1 males age 18 and over.

96.44% of residents reported being of one race. The racial makeup of the county was 92.6% White, 1.4% Black or African American, 0.3% American Indian and Alaska Native, 0.5% Asian, 0.3% Native Hawaiian and Pacific Islander, 1.3% from some other race, and 3.6% from two or more races. Hispanic or Latino residents of any race comprised 2.8% of the population.

Decatur County Racial Composition
Race	Number	Percent
White (NH)	7,010	91.7%
Black or African American (NH)	97	1.26%
Native American (NH)	17	0.22%
Asian (NH)	39	0.51%
Pacific Islander (NH)	21	0.27%
Other/Mixed (NH)	250	3.3%
Hispanic or Latino	211	2.8%

<0.1% of residents lived in urban areas, while 100.0% lived in rural areas.

There were 2,986 households in the county, of which 27.5% had children under the age of 18 living in them. Of all households, 50.5% were married-couple households, 20.7% were households with a male householder and no spouse or partner present, and 23.6% were households with a female householder and no spouse or partner present. About 30.8% of all households were made up of individuals and 14.3% had someone living alone who was 65 years of age or older.

There were 3,653 housing units, of which 2,986 were occupied, leaving an 18.3% vacancy rate. Among occupied housing units, 72.5% were owner-occupied and 27.5% were renter-occupied. The homeowner vacancy rate was 2.7% and the rental vacancy rate was 13.4%.

=== 2010 census ===
The 2010 census recorded a population of 8,457 in the county, with a population density of 15.9/sq mi (6.1/km^{2}). There were 3,834 housing units, of which 3,223 were occupied.

=== 2000 census ===
At the 2000 census, there were 8,689 people, 3,337 households and 2,149 families residing in the county. The population density was 16 per square mile (6.2/km^{2}). There were 3,833 housing units at an average density of 7 per square mile (2.7/km^{2}). The racial makeup of the county was 96.46% White, 0.98% Black or African American, 0.24% Native American, 0.63% Asian, 0.12% Pacific Islander, 0.46% from other races, and 1.12% from two or more races. 1.70% of the population were Hispanic or Latino of any race.

There were 3,337 households, of which 28.00% had children under the age of 18 living with them, 54.30% were married couples living together, 7.20% had a female householder with no husband present, and 35.60% were non-families. 30.30% of all households were made up of individuals, and 15.50% had someone living alone who was 65 years of age or older. The average household size was 2.37 and the average family size was 2.96.

23.00% of the population were under the age of 18, 16.30% from 18 to 24, 21.60% from 25 to 44, 21.50% from 45 to 64, and 17.70% who were 65 years of age or older. The median age was 36 years. For every 100 females there were 95.70 males. For every 100 females age 18 and over, there were 91.90 males.

The median household income was $27,343 and the median family income was $34,831. Males had a median income of $25,569 compared with $19,309 for females. The per capita income for the county was $14,209. About 10.90% of families and 15.50% of the population were below the poverty line, including 15.60% of those under age 18 and 13.70% of those age 65 or over.

Decatur County is considered to be the poorest in Iowa, reporting that almost 20% of its residents live in poverty.

== County officials ==
Supervisors
Steve Fulkerson
Doug Tharp
Ward Graham

Treasurer
Janet Pierson

Attorney
Alan Wilson

Auditor
Charlene Hoover

Recorder
Erica Cook

Sheriff
Chris Lane

Assessor
Justin Cornett

Engineer
Justin Savage

Clerk of Court
Traci Tharp

Public Health Administrator
Shelley Bickel

Veterans Affairs Administrator
Samantha Schaff

Conservation Director
Kayla Clausen

Mental Health Director
Kathy Lerma

== Communities ==
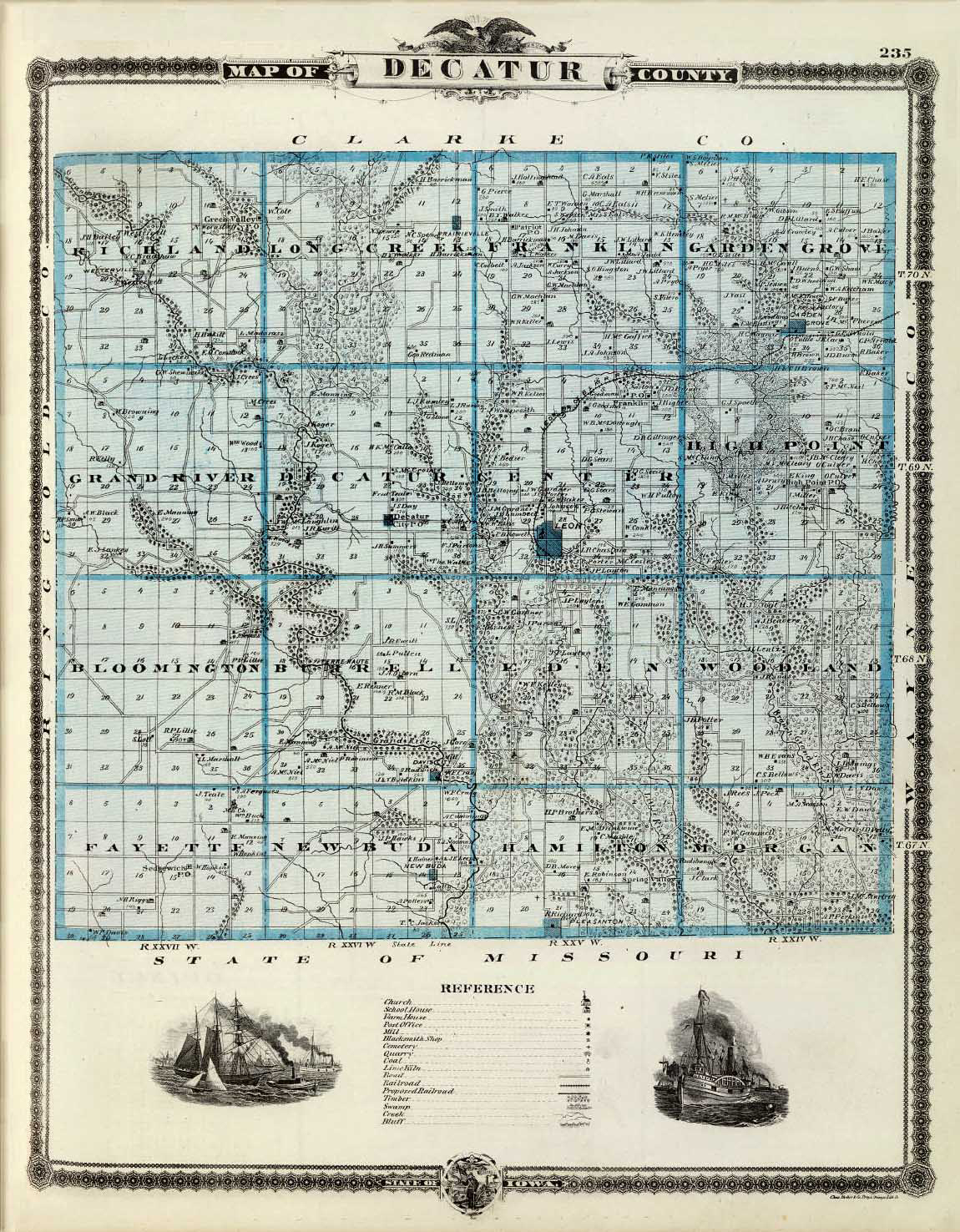
Ancient Map of Decatur County, Iowa (1894)

=== Cities ===
- Davis City
- Decatur City
- Garden Grove
- Grand River
- Lamoni
- Leon
- Le Roy
- Pleasanton
- Van Wert
- Weldon

=== Townships ===
Decatur County is divided into these townships:

- Bloomington
- Burrell
- Center
- Decatur
- Eden
- Fayette
- Franklin
- Garden Grove
- Grand River
- Hamilton
- High Point
- Long Creek
- Morgan
- New Buda
- Richland
- Woodland

=== Population ranking ===
The population ranking of the following table is based on the 2020 census of Decatur County.

† county seat

Rank	City/Town/etc.	Municipal type	Population (2020 Census)
1	Lamoni	City	1,969
2	† Leon	City	1,822
3	Grand River	City	196
4	Davis City	City	179
5	Van Wert	City	178
6	Decatur City	City	175
7	Garden Grove	City	174
8	Weldon (partially in Clarke County)	City	136
9	Pleasanton	City	32
10	Le Roy	City	11

== Politics ==
United States presidential election results for Decatur County, Iowa
Year	Republican		Democratic		Third party(ies)	
Year	No.	%	No.	%	No.	%
1896	2,268	48.46%	2,362	50.47%	50	1.07%
1900	2,415	53.21%	2,058	45.34%	66	1.45%
1904	2,430	58.44%	1,548	37.23%	180	4.33%
1908	2,149	52.53%	1,809	44.22%	133	3.25%
1912	1,351	34.39%	1,659	42.24%	918	23.37%
1916	1,962	47.45%	2,111	51.05%	62	1.50%
1920	4,187	61.17%	2,592	37.87%	66	0.96%
1924	3,221	47.13%	1,693	24.77%	1,921	28.11%
1928	3,942	59.06%	2,675	40.07%	58	0.87%
1932	2,148	36.84%	3,591	61.60%	91	1.56%
1936	3,327	44.40%	4,131	55.12%	36	0.48%
1940	3,494	46.91%	3,938	52.87%	16	0.21%
1944	2,934	46.81%	3,316	52.90%	18	0.29%
1948	2,547	43.89%	3,172	54.66%	84	1.45%
1952	3,621	58.71%	2,521	40.87%	26	0.42%
1956	2,912	50.86%	2,806	49.01%	7	0.12%
1960	3,039	55.69%	2,411	44.18%	7	0.13%
1964	1,542	31.57%	3,331	68.19%	12	0.25%
1968	2,261	49.28%	2,057	44.83%	270	5.88%
1972	2,638	57.44%	1,880	40.93%	75	1.63%
1976	1,932	41.05%	2,698	57.32%	77	1.64%
1980	2,212	47.67%	2,048	44.14%	380	8.19%
1984	2,104	49.60%	2,098	49.46%	40	0.94%
1988	1,406	38.76%	2,192	60.44%	29	0.80%
1992	1,316	33.02%	1,866	46.81%	804	20.17%
1996	1,287	35.52%	1,846	50.95%	490	13.52%
2000	1,903	51.31%	1,674	45.13%	132	3.56%
2004	2,088	52.06%	1,859	46.35%	64	1.60%
2008	2,020	49.20%	1,986	48.37%	100	2.44%
2012	1,947	50.80%	1,791	46.73%	95	2.48%
2016	2,296	61.49%	1,201	32.16%	237	6.35%
2020	2,615	68.74%	1,120	29.44%	69	1.81%
2024	2,711	72.51%	957	25.60%	71	1.90%

== See also ==
- Decatur County Courthouse (Iowa)
- National Register of Historic Places listings in Decatur County, Iowa
