= Union Township, Crawford County, Iowa =

Township in Iowa, USA

Union Township
- Township
- Location in Crawford County
- Coordinates: 41°54′38″N 095°30′04″W
- Country: United States
- State: Iowa
- County: Crawford

Area
  - Total: 35.97 sq mi (93.15 km^{2})
  - Land: 35.84 sq mi (92.82 km^{2})
  - Water: 0.12 sq mi (0.32 km^{2}) 0.34%
- Elevation: 1,207 ft (368 m)

Population (2000)
  - Total: 876
  - Density: 24/sq mi (9.4/km^{2})
- GNIS feature ID: 0468815

Union Township is a township in Crawford County, Iowa, USA. As of the 2000 census, its population was 876.

== Geography ==
Union Township covers an area of 35.96 square miles (93.1 km^{2}) and contains two incorporated settlements: Arion and Dow City. According to the USGS, it contains two cemeteries: Butler and Dow City.

The streams of Buss Creek, Paradise Creek, Welsh Creek and Willow Creek run through this township.
