= Otter Creek Township, Crawford County, Iowa =

Otter Creek Township
- Township
- Location in Crawford County
- Coordinates: 42°09′54″N 095°23′00″W
- Country: United States
- State: Iowa
- County: Crawford

Area
  - Total: 35.48 sq mi (91.89 km^{2})
  - Land: 35.45 sq mi (91.82 km^{2})
  - Water: 0.027 sq mi (0.07 km^{2}) 0.08%
- Elevation: 1,352 ft (412 m)

Population (2000)
  - Total: 1,359
  - Density: 38/sq mi (14.8/km^{2})
- GNIS feature ID: 0468485

Otter Creek Township is a township in Crawford County, Iowa, USA. As of the 2000 census, its population was 1,359.

== Geography ==
Otter Creek Township covers an area of 35.48 square miles (91.9 km^{2}) and contains two incorporated settlements: Kiron and Schleswig. According to the USGS, it contains two cemeteries: Lehfeld and Otter Creek.

The stream of East Otter Creek runs through this township.
