= Schleswig Community School District =

Public school

Coordinates: 42.164103°N 95.428501°W

Location
- Schleswig, Iowa Crawford and Ida counties United States
- Coordinates: 42.164103, -95.428501

District information
- Type: Local school district
- Grades: K-8
- Superintendent: Michael Pardun
- Schools: 2
- Budget: $4,661,000 (2020-21)
- NCES District ID: 1925410

Students and staff
- Students: 139 (2022-23)
- Teachers: 12.18 FTE
- Staff: 16.35 FTE
- Student–teacher ratio: 11.41
- Athletic conference: Hawkeye 10
- District mascot: Hawks
- Colors: Black and Gold

Other information
- Website: www.schleswig.k12.ia.us

The Schleswig Community School District is a rural public school district based in Schleswig, Iowa. The district is mainly in Crawford County, with a small area in Ida County. The district serves the towns of Schleswig and Ricketts, and the surrounding rural areas.

The district shares a superintendent with the Denison Community School District. The school's mascot is the Hawks. Their colors are black and gold.

== History ==
Since 1994, through a sharing agreement with Denison CSD, students from Schleswig attend high school in Denison, and compete as Denison-Schleswig.

== Schools ==
The district operates two schools in a single building, located at 214 Date Street, Schleswig:

- Schleswig Elementary School
- Schleswig Middle School
