= Astor, Iowa =

- unincorporated community
- Location within Iowa
- Coordinates: 41°52′12″N 95°16′00″W
- Country: United States
- State: Iowa
- County: Crawford County
- Platted: 1882
- Elevation: 1,299 ft (396 m)
- Time zone: UTC-6 (Central (CST))
  - Summer (DST): UTC-5 (CDT)
- GNIS feature ID: 464452

Astor was an unincorporated community in Crawford County, in the U.S. state of Iowa.

== Geography ==
Astor was located in Nishnabotny Township on county road M38 where that road crosses the present-day BNSF Railway line.

== History ==
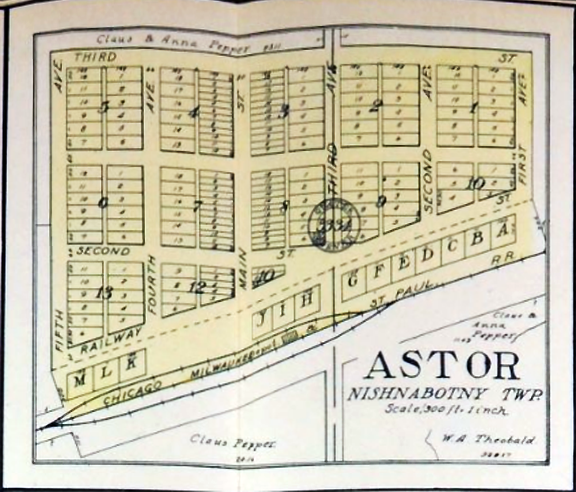
Plat map of Astor, Iowa, in 1908

Astor was platted on the Chicago, Milwaukee, and St Paul Railroad in 1882 by Alexander Liedlum. Astor had a Methodist church, a school, a grain elevator, and a general store which also served as the post office. The town grew quickly, but railroad officials set the junction of the rail line two miles northeast, to nearby Manilla. Many residents in Astor then moved their houses to Manilla, pulling them on horse-drawn skids. The community was slowly abandoned.

In the 1880s, a church and parsonage were built in Astor. The church was moved to nearby Manilla around 1887.

Even after several years of decline, in 1911 Astor was said to have maintained its identity as "a pleasant little village" and had a "good store, good school, and a post office."

The community's population was 150 in 1890, 22 in 1900, and 42 in 1920. The population of Astor was 28 in 1940.

The town's people realized the opportunities for growth at this junction and moved in large part to the newly platted town. The resulting community became known as Manilla. Business buildings, homes, and the Methodist Church were moved cross-county by pulling them on skids behind teams of horses. Astor was left almost abandoned.

== See also ==
- Old Kiron, Iowa
