= Milford Township, Crawford County, Iowa =

Milford Township
- Township
- Location in Crawford County
- Coordinates: 42°04′51″N 095°16′09″W
- Country: United States
- State: Iowa
- County: Crawford

Area
  - Total: 36.12 sq mi (93.54 km^{2})
  - Land: 36.10 sq mi (93.51 km^{2})
  - Water: 0.012 sq mi (0.03 km^{2}) 0.03%
- Elevation: 1,335 ft (407 m)

Population (2000)
  - Total: 537
  - Density: 15/sq mi (5.7/km^{2})
- GNIS feature ID: 0468379

Milford Township is a township in Crawford County, Iowa, United States. As of the 2000 census, its population was 537.

== Geography ==
Milford Township covers an area of 36.12 square miles (93.6 km^{2}) and contains one incorporated settlement, Deloit. According to the USGS, it contains three cemeteries: King, Milford and Vail.

The stream of Otter Creek runs through this township.
