= Washington Township, Crawford County, Iowa =

Washington Township
- Township
- Location in Crawford County
- Coordinates: 41°54′26″N 095°22′52″W
- Country: United States
- State: Iowa
- County: Crawford

Area
  - Total: 36.03 sq mi (93.32 km^{2})
  - Land: 36.00 sq mi (93.25 km^{2})
  - Water: 0.023 sq mi (0.06 km^{2}) 0.06%
- Elevation: 1,296 ft (395 m)

Population (2000)
  - Total: 293
  - Density: 8.0/sq mi (3.1/km^{2})
- GNIS feature ID: 0468912

Washington Township is a township in Crawford County, Iowa, United States. As of the 2000 census, its population was 293.

== Geography ==
Washington Township covers an area of 36.03 square miles (93.3 km^{2}) and contains one incorporated settlement, Buck Grove. According to the USGS, it contains four cemeteries: Buck Grove, Clinton County Farm, Washington Township and Washington Township.
