= Iowa Highway 39 =

State highway in Iowa, United States

Iowa Highway 39
- Iowa 39 highlighted in red

Route information
- Maintained by Iowa DOT
- Existed: January 1, 1969–present

Major junctions
- South end: US 59 / Iowa 141 in Denison
- North end: Iowa 175 / CR M43 in Odebolt

Location
- Country: United States
- State: Iowa
- Counties: Crawford, Sac

Highway system
- Iowa Primary Highway System; Interstate; US; State; Secondary; Scenic
← Iowa 38	→ Iowa 44

Iowa Highway 39 (Iowa 39) is a north–south state highway in western Iowa. It begins at an intersection with U.S. Route 59 and Iowa Highway 141 on the western edge of Denison. The route ends at its intersection with Iowa Highway 175 on the eastern side of Odebolt.

== Route description ==
Iowa 39 begins on the west side of Denison, Iowa at an intersection with U.S. Highway 59 and Iowa Highway 141. Heading north-northwest, it runs parallel to the Boyer River between Denison and Deloit. At Deloit, the route straightens northward and travels 7 miles (11 km) to Kiron. North of Kiron, it turns east for 4 miles (6.4 km) before turning back to the north for 7 miles (11 km). The route ends at Iowa Highway 175 in Odebolt.

== History ==
Prior to 1969, the route that is now designated as Iowa 39 was designated as Iowa Highway 4. This version of Iowa 4 once connected Hamburg and Spirit Lake along the current routings of U.S. Route 275, U.S. Highway 59, and U.S. Highway 71. In 1969, when many routes were renumbered, Iowa 4 was redesignated as Iowa Highway 39.

== Major intersections ==
County	Location	mi	km	Destinations	Notes
Crawford	Denison	0.000	0.000	US 59 / Iowa 141 – Denison, Charter Oak, Harlan	
Sac	Odebolt	24.321	39.141	Iowa 175 (Market Street) / CR M43 (Des Moines Street) – Odebolt, Lake View	
1.000 mi = 1.609 km; 1.000 km = 0.621 mi
