= Soldier Township =

Soldier Township may refer to the following townships in the United States:

- Soldier Township, Crawford County, Iowa
- Soldier Township, Jackson County, Kansas
- Soldier Township, Shawnee County, Kansas
