= West Side Township, Crawford County, Iowa =

West Side Township
- Township
- Location in Crawford County
- Coordinates: 42°04′46″N 095°09′01″W
- Country: United States
- State: Iowa
- County: Crawford

Area
  - Total: 36.02 sq mi (93.29 km^{2})
  - Land: 35.99 sq mi (93.21 km^{2})
  - Water: 0.031 sq mi (0.08 km^{2}) 0.09%
- Elevation: 1,299 ft (396 m)

Population (2000)
  - Total: 980
  - Density: 27/sq mi (10.5/km^{2})
- GNIS feature ID: 0468988

West Side Township is a township in Crawford County, Iowa, United States. As of the 2000 census, its population was 980.

== Geography ==
West Side Township covers an area of 36.02 square miles (93.3 km^{2}) and contains two incorporated settlements: Vail and Westside. According to the USGS, it contains two cemeteries: Saint Anns and Westside.

The streams of King Creek and Miller Creek run through this township.
