= Crawford County, Iowa =

County in Iowa, United States

- County
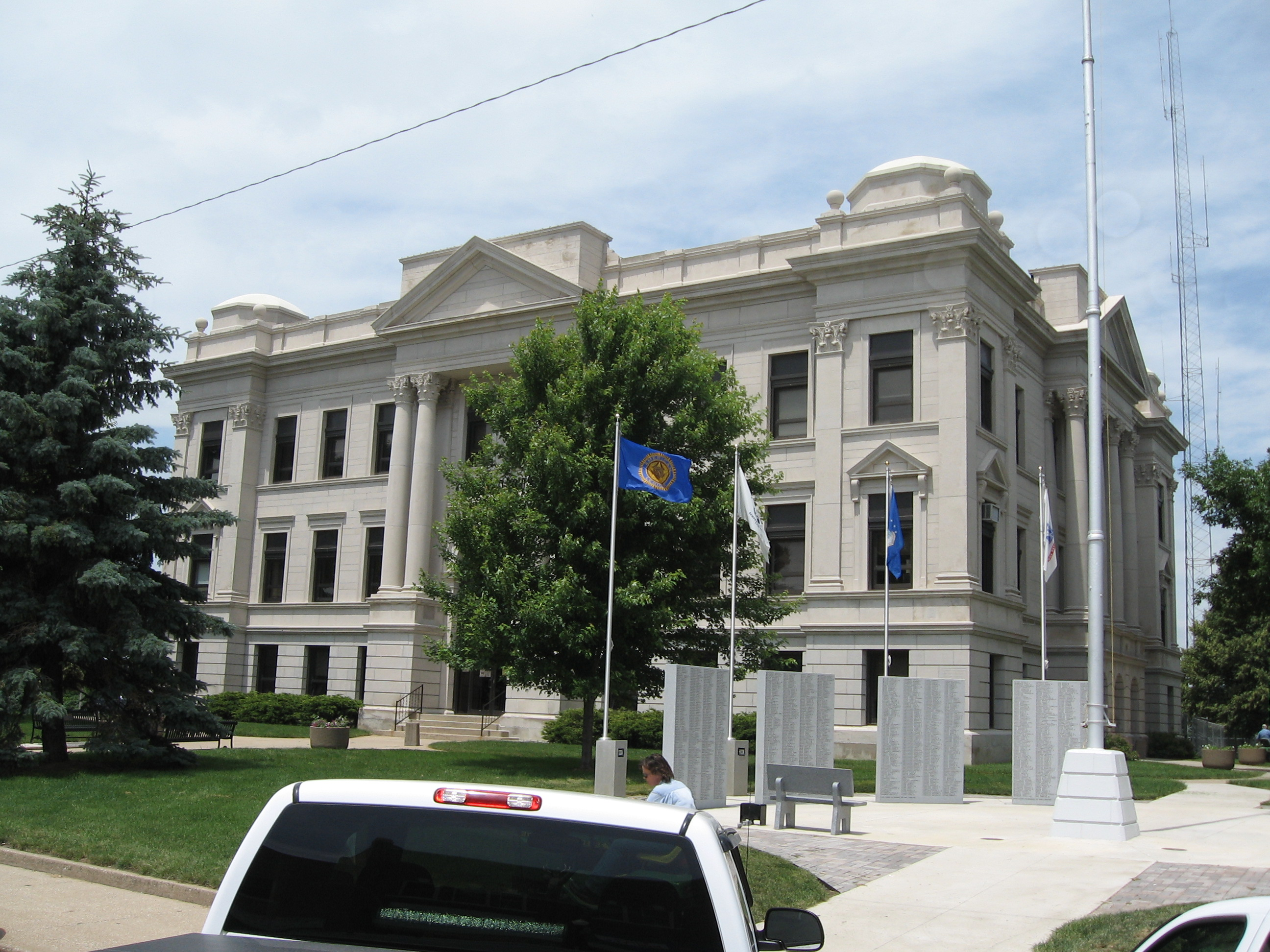
- The Crawford County Courthouse in Denison

- Location within the U.S. state of Iowa
- Coordinates: 42.043119°N 95.389090°W
- Country: United States
- State: Iowa
- Founded: January 15, 1851 (created); September 3, 1855 (organized)
- Named for: William Harris Crawford
- Seat: Denison
- Largest city: Denison

Area
  - Total: 715.037 sq mi (1,851.94 km^{2})
  - Land: 714.198 sq mi (1,849.76 km^{2})
  - Water: 0.839 sq mi (2.17 km^{2}) 0.12%

Population (2020)
  - Total: 16,525
  - Estimate (2025): 16,237 ▼
  - Density: 23.138/sq mi (8.9336/km^{2})
- Time zone: UTC−6 (Central)
  - Summer (DST): UTC−5 (CDT)
- Area code: 712
- Congressional district: 4th
- Website: crawfordcounty.iowa.gov
- Iowa county number 24

Crawford County is a county located in the U.S. state of Iowa. As of the 2020 census, the population was 16,525, and was estimated to be 16,237 in 2025. The county seat is Denison. The county was named for William Harris Crawford, U.S. senator from Georgia and United States Secretary of the Treasury.

== History ==
On January 15, 1851, the Iowa Legislature authorized the creation of 50 additional counties in the state. Due to its lack of inhabitants, the designated Crawford County area was attached to Shelby County for purposes of revenue, taxation, and judicial matters.

In 1855 there were sufficient settlers, who petitioned for separation from Shelby. This was granted, and a county governing structure was established. The county as then designated did not include its present western townships.

In 1865, four eastern townships of Monona County were separated from that county and incorporated into Crawford County's boundary.

After several adjustments and reorganizations, the present arrangement of Crawford County townships was completed in June 1872.

== Geography ==
According to the United States Census Bureau, the county has a total area of 715.037 square miles (1,851.94 km^{2}), of which 714.198 square miles (1,849.76 km^{2}) is land and 0.839 square miles (2.17 km^{2}) (0.12%) is water. It is the 13rd largest county in Iowa by total area.

=== Major highways ===
- U.S. Highway 30 – runs ENE across bottom of county. Enters at Dunlap, exits to Carroll County at Westside.
- U.S. Highway 59 – runs generally north–south through center of county, passing Schleswig and Denison. Its exit into Shelby County is five miles east of its entry from Ida County.
- Iowa Highway 37 – cuts the SW corner of county, running SE from Monona County to Harrison County.
- Iowa Highway 39 – runs north and ENE from Denison to Kiron, then into Ida and Sac Counties.
- Iowa Highway 141 – enters SE part of county at Aspinwall, runs west to intersection with US Highway 59, two miles above the county's south line.

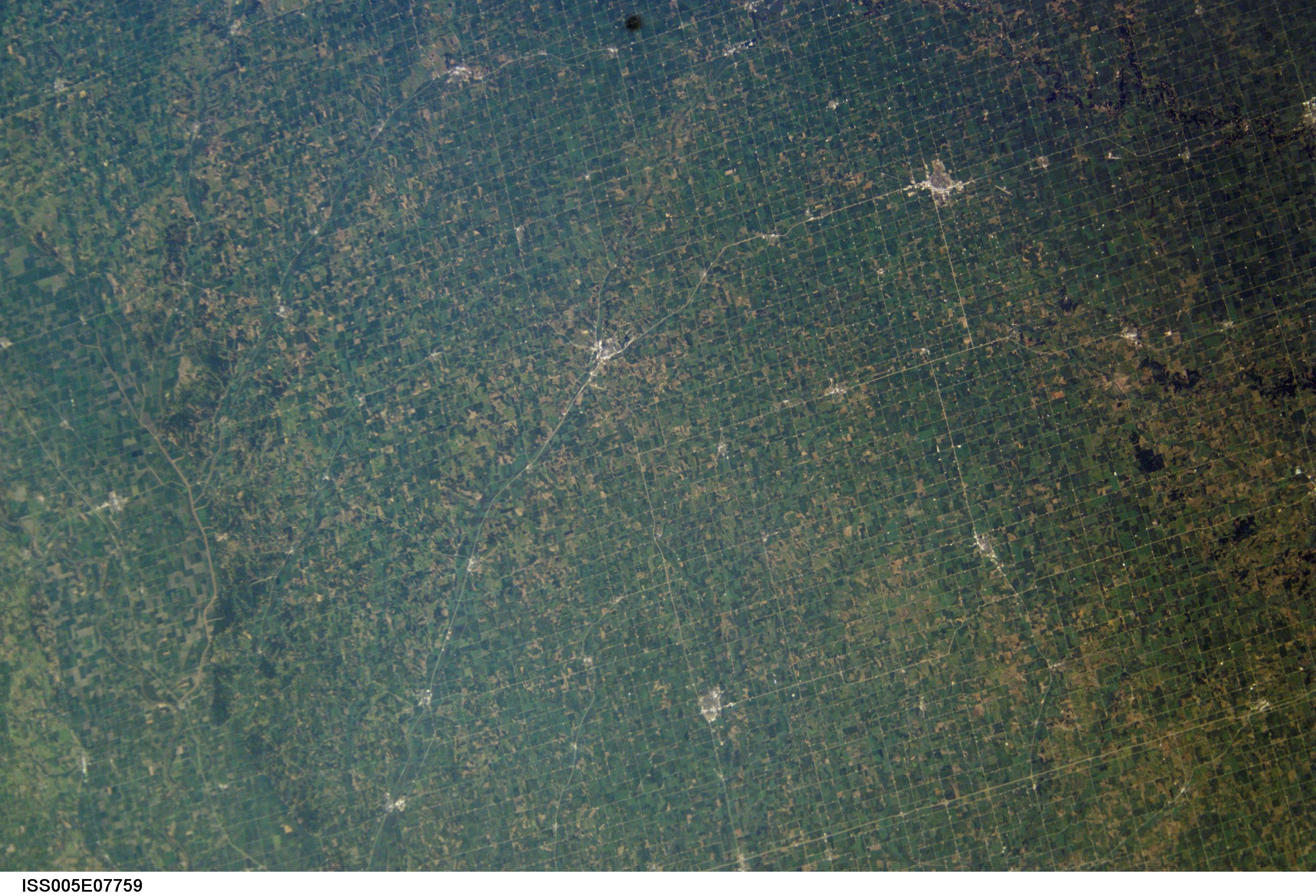
View of Crawford County and adjacent counties, with Denison just above the center. Taken from the International Space Station on July 14, 2002.

=== Adjacent counties ===
- Ida County − north
- Sac County − northeast
- Carroll County − east
- Audubon County − southeast
- Shelby County − south
- Harrison County − southwest
- Monona County − west
- Woodbury County − northwest

== Demographics ==
Historical population
Census	Pop.	Note	%±
1860	383		—
1870	2,530		560.6%
1880	12,413		390.6%
1890	18,894		52.2%
1900	21,685		14.8%
1910	20,041		−7.6%
1920	20,614		2.9%
1930	21,028		2.0%
1940	20,538		−2.3%
1950	19,741		−3.9%
1960	18,569		−5.9%
1970	19,116		2.9%
1980	18,935		−0.9%
1990	16,775		−11.4%
2000	16,942		1.0%
2010	17,096		0.9%
2020	16,525		−3.3%
2025 (est.)	16,237	▼	−1.7%
U.S. Decennial Census; 1790–1960 1900–1990; 1990–2000 2010–2020

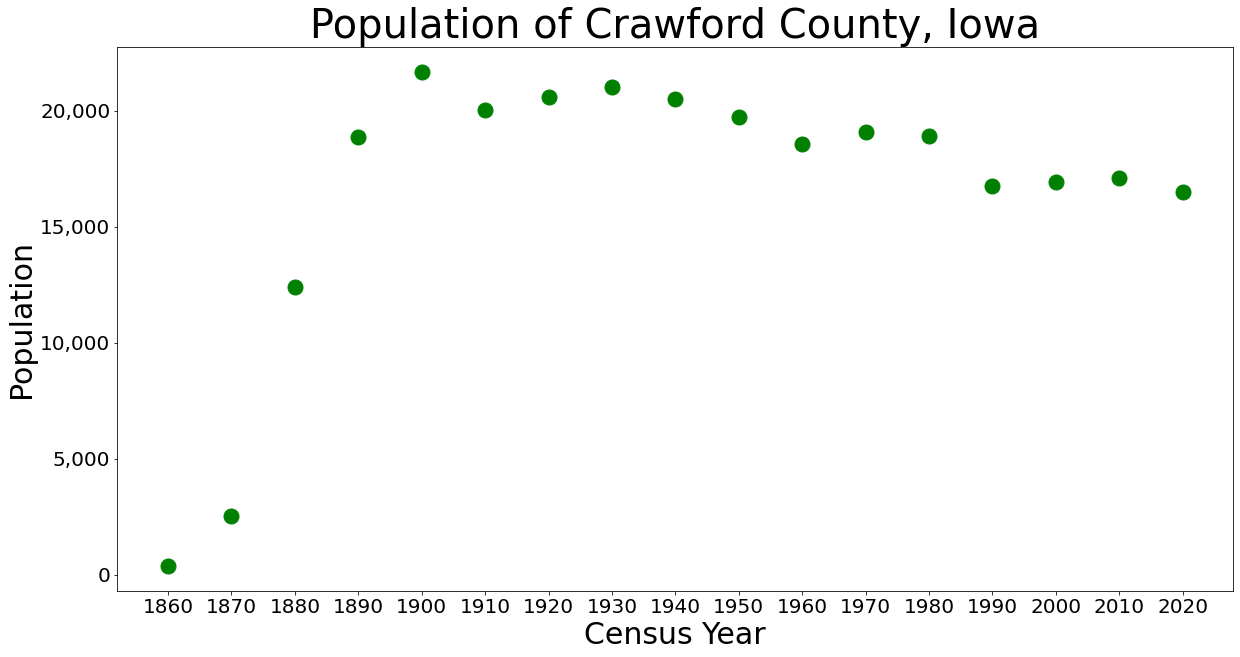
Population of Crawford County from US census data

=== 2020 census ===
As of the 2020 census, the county had a population of 16,525, a population density of 23.1/sq mi (8.9/km^{2}), and 89.34% of residents reported being of one race. There were 6,855 housing units, of which 6,255 were occupied.

The median age was 37.8 years, with 26.8% of residents under the age of 18 and 18.0% of residents 65 years of age or older. For every 100 females there were 102.1 males, and for every 100 females age 18 and over there were 102.4 males age 18 and over.

The racial makeup of the county was 68.2% White, 2.4% Black or African American, 1.0% American Indian and Alaska Native, 1.9% Asian, <0.1% Native Hawaiian and Pacific Islander, 15.9% from some other race, and 10.7% from two or more races. Hispanic or Latino residents of any race comprised 29.7% of the population.

Crawford County Racial Composition
Race	Number	Percent
White (NH)	10,625	64.3%
Black or African American (NH)	383	2.32%
Native American (NH)	31	0.2%
Asian (NH)	303	1.83%
Pacific Islander (NH)	4	0.02%
Other/Mixed (NH)	267	1.62%
Hispanic or Latino	4,912	29.72%

49.3% of residents lived in urban areas, while 50.7% lived in rural areas.

There were 6,255 households in the county, of which 32.4% had children under the age of 18 living in them. Of all households, 50.9% were married-couple households, 19.8% were households with a male householder and no spouse or partner present, and 22.5% were households with a female householder and no spouse or partner present. About 28.4% of all households were made up of individuals and 14.2% had someone living alone who was 65 years of age or older.

There were 6,855 housing units, of which 8.8% were vacant. Among occupied housing units, 72.6% were owner-occupied and 27.4% were renter-occupied. The homeowner vacancy rate was 1.6% and the rental vacancy rate was 8.9%.

=== 2010 census ===
The 2010 census recorded a population of 17,096 in the county, with a population density of 23.9/sq mi (9.2/km^{2}). There were 6,943 housing units, of which 6,413 were occupied.

=== 2000 census ===
As of the 2000 census, there were 16,942 people, 6,441 households, and 4,489 families residing in the county. The population density was 24 inhabitants per square mile (9.3/km^{2}). There were 6,958 housing units at an average density of 10 per square mile (3.9/km^{2}). The racial makeup of the county was 93.10% White, 0.76% Black or African American, 0.28% Native American, 0.49% Asian, 0.01% Pacific Islander, 4.59% from other races, and 0.77% from two or more races. Hispanic or Latino people of any race were 8.75% of the population.

There were 6,441 households, out of which 31.60% had children under the age of 18 living with them, 58.50% were married couples living together, 7.00% had a female householder with no husband present, and 30.30% were non-families. 26.20% of all households were made up of individuals, and 13.10% had someone living alone who was 65 years of age or older. The average household size was 2.53 and the average family size was 3.03.

In the county, the population was spread out, with 26.50% under the age of 18, 8.10% from 18 to 24, 25.70% from 25 to 44, 22.50% from 45 to 64, and 17.10% who were 65 years of age or older. The median age was 38 years. For every 100 females there were 100.90 males. For every 100 females age 18 and over, there were 98.80 males.

The median income for a household in the county was $33,922, and the median income for a family was $40,231. Males had a median income of $28,696 versus $19,798 for females. The per capita income for the county was $15,851. About 6.90% of families and 11.10% of the population were below the poverty line, including 12.70% of those under age 18 and 5.60% of those age 65 or over.

== Communities ==
=== Cities ===
- Arion
- Aspinwall
- Buck Grove
- Charter Oak
- Deloit
- Denison
- Dow City
- Kiron
- Manilla
- Ricketts
- Schleswig
- Vail
- Westside

=== Former cities ===
- Astor
- Berne
- Boyer
- Ells
- Kenwood
- Old Kiron

=== Townships ===
- Boyer
- Charter Oak
- Denison
- East Boyer
- Goodrich
- Hanover
- Hayes
- Iowa
- Jackson
- Milford
- Morgan
- Nishnabotny
- Otter Creek
- Paradise
- Soldier
- Stockholm
- Union
- Washington
- West Side
- Willow

=== Population ranking ===
The population ranking of the following table is based on the 2020 census of Crawford County.

† county seat

Rank	City/Town/etc.	Municipal type	Population (2020 Census)
1	† Denison	City	8,373
2	Schleswig	City	830
3	Manilla	City	775
4	Charter Oak	City	535
5	Dow City	City	485
6	Vail	City	396
7	Westside	City	285
8	Kiron	City	267
9	Deloit	City	250
10	Ricketts	City	109
11	Arion	City	97
12	Buck Grove	City	34
13	Aspinwall	City	33
14	Dunlap (mostly in Harrison County)	City	0 (1,038 total)

== Politics ==
Like most of western Iowa, Crawford County leans toward the Republican Party. However, although it gave two-thirds of its vote to Donald Trump in both 2016 and 2020, it supported Democrat Barack Obama in 2008.

United States presidential election results for Crawford County, Iowa
Year	Republican		Democratic		Third party(ies)	
Year	No.	%	No.	%	No.	%
1896	2,189	46.98%	2,396	51.43%	74	1.59%
1900	2,268	45.72%	2,578	51.97%	115	2.32%
1904	2,530	54.08%	2,004	42.84%	144	3.08%
1908	2,169	47.28%	2,322	50.61%	97	2.11%
1912	1,169	25.03%	2,193	46.96%	1,308	28.01%
1916	2,756	58.27%	1,919	40.57%	55	1.16%
1920	5,473	68.65%	2,151	26.98%	348	4.37%
1924	2,882	36.26%	1,255	15.79%	3,812	47.96%
1928	3,436	43.05%	4,495	56.32%	50	0.63%
1932	2,334	26.10%	6,084	68.04%	524	5.86%
1936	3,514	36.98%	5,720	60.20%	268	2.82%
1940	5,284	55.92%	4,130	43.71%	35	0.37%
1944	4,242	56.49%	3,218	42.86%	49	0.65%
1948	3,267	43.65%	3,983	53.21%	235	3.14%
1952	5,646	63.67%	3,107	35.04%	115	1.30%
1956	4,608	55.03%	3,749	44.77%	17	0.20%
1960	4,791	56.25%	3,720	43.67%	7	0.08%
1964	2,999	37.31%	5,024	62.51%	14	0.17%
1968	4,287	55.36%	2,851	36.82%	606	7.83%
1972	4,493	58.60%	3,018	39.36%	156	2.03%
1976	3,879	48.80%	3,903	49.11%	166	2.09%
1980	4,883	61.02%	2,500	31.24%	619	7.74%
1984	4,552	56.53%	3,396	42.17%	105	1.30%
1988	3,375	46.16%	3,868	52.91%	68	0.93%
1992	2,693	35.10%	3,004	39.16%	1,975	25.74%
1996	2,686	40.00%	3,140	46.76%	889	13.24%
2000	3,482	53.12%	2,838	43.30%	235	3.59%
2004	3,955	54.61%	3,220	44.46%	67	0.93%
2008	3,345	46.52%	3,715	51.66%	131	1.82%
2012	3,595	53.24%	3,066	45.41%	91	1.35%
2016	4,617	66.58%	1,991	28.71%	327	4.72%
2020	4,854	67.85%	2,220	31.03%	80	1.12%
2024	4,651	71.06%	1,812	27.69%	82	1.25%

== Education ==
School districts include:

- Ar-We-Va Community School District
- Boyer Valley Community School District
- Charter Oak-Ute Community School District
- Denison Community School District
- East Sac County Community School District
- IKM-Manning Community School District
- Maple Valley-Anthon Oto Community School District
- Odebolt Arthur Battle Creek Ida Grove Community School District
- Schleswig Community School District

Former school districts:

- Battle Creek-Ida Grove Community School District
- IKM Community School District
- Manning Community School District
- Maple Valley Community School District
- Odebolt-Arthur Community School District
- Wall Lake View Auburn Community School District

== See also ==
- National Register of Historic Places listings in Crawford County, Iowa
- Crawford County Courthouse
