= Denison Township, Crawford County, Iowa =

Denison Township
- Township
- Location in Crawford County
- Coordinates: 41°59′26″N 095°22′53″W
- Country: United States
- State: Iowa
- County: Crawford

Area
  - Total: 35.39 sq mi (91.66 km^{2})
  - Land: 35.35 sq mi (91.56 km^{2})
  - Water: 0.039 sq mi (0.1 km^{2}) 0.11%
- Elevation: 1,263 ft (385 m)

Population (2000)
  - Total: 7,757
  - Density: 219/sq mi (84.7/km^{2})
- GNIS feature ID: 0467702

Denison Township is a township in Crawford County, Iowa, United States. As of the 2000 census, its population was 7,757.

== Geography ==
Denison Township covers an area of 35.39 square miles (91.7 km^{2}) and contains one incorporated settlement, Denison (the county seat). According to the USGS, it contains five cemeteries: Crawford County Home, Crawford Heights Memorial, Oakland, Saint Rose of Lima and Zion.

The streams of Coon Creek, East Boyer River and Willow Creek run through this township.

== Transportation ==
Denison Township contains one airport, Denison Municipal Airport.
