= Morgan Township, Crawford County, Iowa =

Morgan Township
- Township
- Location in Crawford County
- Coordinates: 42°10′03″N 095°30′00″W
- Country: United States
- State: Iowa
- County: Crawford

Area
  - Total: 35.6 sq mi (92.3 km^{2})
  - Land: 35.6 sq mi (92.3 km^{2})
  - Water: 0 sq mi (0 km^{2}) 0%
- Elevation: 1,414 ft (431 m)

Population (2000)
  - Total: 225
  - Density: 6.2/sq mi (2.4/km^{2})
- GNIS feature ID: 0468404

Morgan Township is a township in Crawford County, Iowa, USA. As of the 2000 census, its population was 225.

== Geography ==
Morgan Township covers an area of 35.64 square miles (92.3 km^{2}) and contains no incorporated settlements. According to the USGS, it contains one cemetery, Morgan.
