= Soldier Township, Crawford County, Iowa =

Soldier Township
- Township
- Location in Crawford County
- Coordinates: 42°09′41″N 095°36′15″W
- Country: United States
- State: Iowa
- County: Crawford

Area
  - Total: 36 sq mi (92 km^{2})
  - Land: 35.51 sq mi (91.98 km^{2})
  - Water: 0.0039 sq mi (0.01 km^{2}) 0.01%
- Elevation: 1,401 ft (427 m)

Population (2000)
  - Total: 323
  - Density: 9.1/sq mi (3.5/km^{2})
- GNIS feature ID: 0468725

Soldier Township is a township in Crawford County, Iowa, United States. As of the 2000 census, its population was 323.

== Geography ==
Soldier Township covers an area of 35.52 square miles (92.0 km^{2}) and contains one incorporated settlement, Ricketts.

The stream of Beaver Creek runs through this township.
