= Boyer Valley Community School District =

School district in Iowa

Coordinates: 41.853989°N 95.594403°W

Location
- Dunlap, Iowa Crawford, Harrison, Monona, and Shelby counties United States
- Coordinates: 41.853989, -95.594403

District information
- Type: Local school district
- Grades: K-12
- Established: 1994
- Schools: 2
- Budget: $7,325,000 (2020-21)
- NCES District ID: 1909570

Students and staff
- Students: 420 (2022-23)
- Teachers: 33.78 FTE
- Staff: 40.44 FTE
- Student–teacher ratio: 12.43
- Athletic conference: Rolling Valley
- District mascot: Bulldogs
- Colors: Purple and White

Other information
- Website: www.boyervalley.org

Boyer Valley Community School District (BVCSD) is a school district headquartered in Dunlap, Iowa.

The district occupies sections of Crawford, Harrison, Monona, and Shelby counties. The district serves Dunlap, Arion, and Dow City.

== History ==
It was formed on July 1, 1994, by a merger of the Dunlap and Dow City-Arion school districts.

Circa 1997 the Boyer Valley district and the East Monona Community School District began a grade-sharing program. On September 9, 2003, the residents of the Boyer Valley and East Monona districts voted on a plan to consolidate the districts. Even though Boyer Valley residents voted in favor on a 385 to 30 basis, the East Monona residents voted it down on a 313 to 178 basis.

On July 1, 2004, the East Monona district was dissolved, with portions going to several districts. Boyer Valley absorbed 10% of the former East Monona district.

== Schools ==
- Boyer Valley Elementary School
- Boyer Valley Middle/High School

== Boyer Valley High School ==
=== Athletics ===
The Bulldogs compete in the Rolling Valley Conference in the following sports:

- Baseball
- Basketball (boys and girls)
- Cross Country (boys and girls)
- Football
- Golf
  - Girls' 2004 Class 1A State Champions
- Softball
- Track and Field (boys and girls)
- Volleyball
- Wrestling
