= Willow Township, Crawford County, Iowa =

Willow Township
- Township
- Location in Crawford County
- Coordinates: 41°59′37″N 095°36′51″W
- Country: United States
- State: Iowa
- County: Crawford

Area
  - Total: 35.78 sq mi (92.67 km^{2})
  - Land: 35.71 sq mi (92.48 km^{2})
  - Water: 0.073 sq mi (0.19 km^{2}) 0.21%
- Elevation: 1,350 ft (410 m)

Population (2000)
  - Total: 158
  - Density: 4.4/sq mi (1.7/km^{2})
- GNIS feature ID: 0469003

Willow Township is a township in Crawford County, Iowa, USA. As of the 2000 census, its population was 158.

== Geography ==
Willow Township covers an area of 35.78 square miles (92.7 km^{2}) and contains no incorporated settlements. According to the USGS, it contains one cemetery, Willow Township.

The stream of Middle Willow Creek runs through this township.
