= Boyer Township, Crawford County, Iowa =

Boyer Township
- Township
- Location in Crawford County
- Coordinates: 41°54′26″N 095°36′47″W
- Country: United States
- State: Iowa
- County: Crawford

Area
  - Total: 35.76 sq mi (92.61 km^{2})
  - Land: 35.68 sq mi (92.42 km^{2})
  - Water: 0.073 sq mi (0.19 km^{2}) 0.21%
- Elevation: 1,302 ft (397 m)

Population (2000)
  - Total: 233
  - Density: 6.5/sq mi (2.5/km^{2})
- GNIS feature ID: 0467479

Boyer Township is a township in Crawford County, Iowa, United States. As of the 2000 census, its population was 233.

== Geography ==
Boyer Township covers an area of 35.76 square miles (92.6 km^{2}) and contains no incorporated settlements. According to the USGS, it contains one cemetery, Valley View.
