= Berne, Iowa =

- Unincorporated community
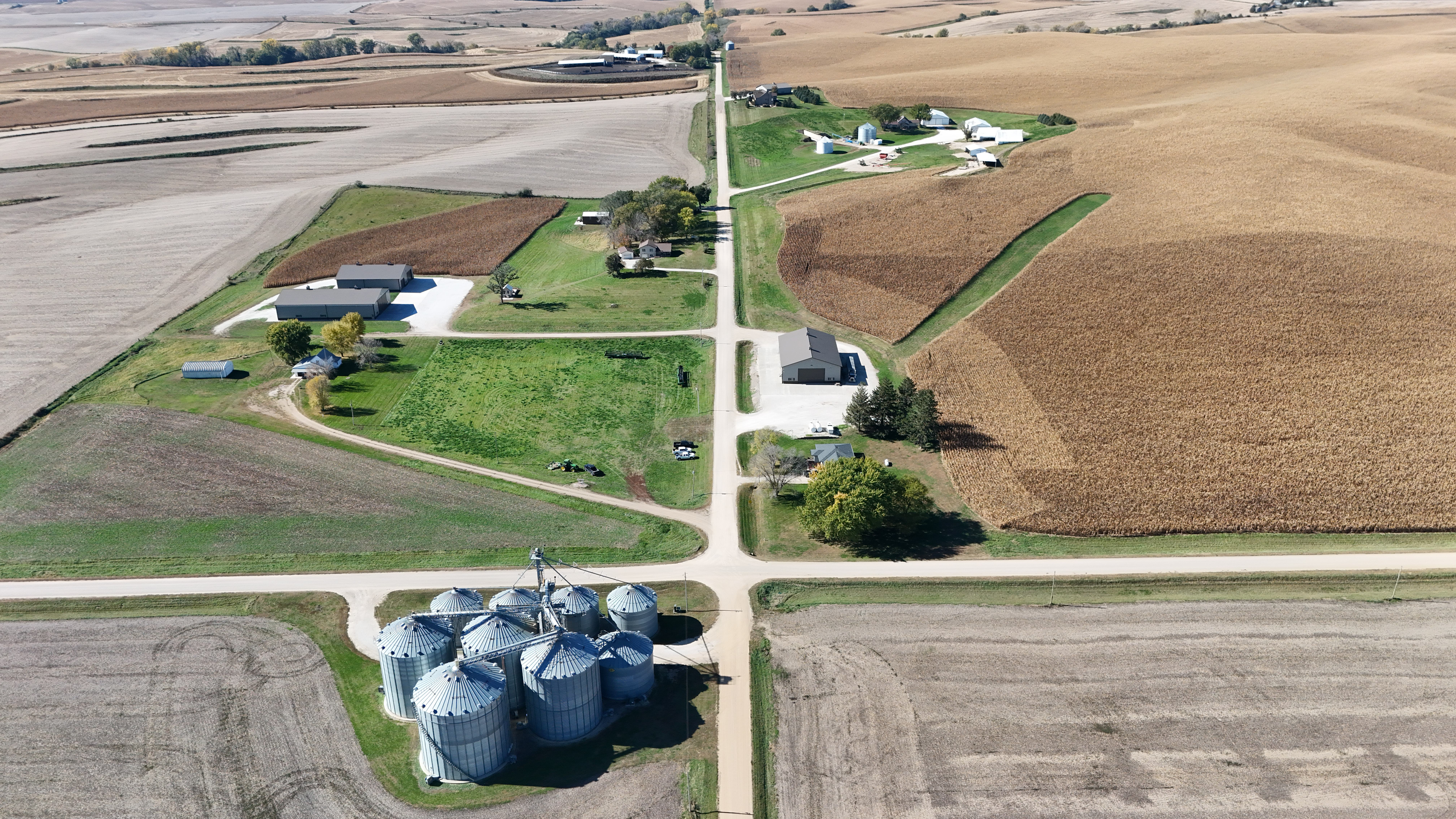
- Berne, looking west along Avenue J

- Location within Iowa
- Coordinates: 42°04′52″N 95°39′10″W
- Country: United States
- State: Iowa
- County: Crawford
- Named for: Bern, Switzerland
- Elevation: 1,217 ft (371 m)
- Time zone: UTC-6 (Central (CST))
  - Summer (DST): UTC-5 (CDT)
- Area code: 712
- GNIS feature ID: 454529

Berne is an unincorporated community in Crawford County, in the U.S. state of Iowa.

== History ==
Berne was platted in 1899. It was named after Bern, in Switzerland.

Berne's population was 11 in 1915, and just 6 in 1925. The population was 25 in 1940.
