= Paradise Township, Crawford County, Iowa =

Paradise Township
- Township
- Location in Crawford County
- Coordinates: 41°59′38″N 095°29′58″W
- Country: United States
- State: Iowa
- County: Crawford

Area
  - Total: 35.97 sq mi (93.16 km^{2})
  - Land: 35.93 sq mi (93.05 km^{2})
  - Water: 0.042 sq mi (0.11 km^{2}) 0.12%
- Elevation: 1,178 ft (359 m)

Population (2000)
  - Total: 344
  - Density: 9.6/sq mi (3.7/km^{2})
- GNIS feature ID: 0468498

Paradise Township is a township in Crawford County, Iowa, USA. As of the 2000 census, its population was 344.

== Geography ==
Paradise Township covers an area of 35.97 square miles (93.2 km^{2}) and contains no incorporated settlements.

The stream of Buck Creek runs through this township.
