= Goodrich Township, Crawford County, Iowa =

Goodrich Township
- Township
- Location in Crawford County
- Coordinates: 42°04′55″N 095°22′45″W
- Country: United States
- State: Iowa
- County: Crawford

Area
  - Total: 36.0 sq mi (93.3 km^{2})
  - Land: 36.02 sq mi (93.29 km^{2})
  - Water: 0.0039 sq mi (0.01 km^{2}) 0.01%
- Elevation: 1,335 ft (407 m)

Population (2000)
  - Total: 315
  - Density: 8.8/sq mi (3.4/km^{2})
- GNIS feature ID: 0467916

Goodrich Township is a township in Crawford County, Iowa, United States. As of the 2000 census, its population was 315.

The township is named after Isaac B. Goodrich, a pioneer settler.

== Geography ==
Goodrich Township covers an area of 36.02 square miles (93.3 km^{2}) and contains no incorporated settlements.

The streams of Bear Creek, Big Creek and Buffalo Creek run through this township.
