= Hanover Township, Crawford County, Iowa =

Hanover Township
- Township
- Location in Crawford County
- Coordinates: 42°04′55″N 095°30′30″W
- Country: United States
- State: Iowa
- County: Crawford

Area
  - Total: 35.74 sq mi (92.57 km^{2})
  - Land: 35.73 sq mi (92.55 km^{2})
  - Water: 0.0077 sq mi (0.02 km^{2}) 0.02%
- Elevation: 1,375 ft (419 m)

Population (2000)
  - Total: 226
  - Density: 6.2/sq mi (2.4/km^{2})
- GNIS feature ID: 0467999

Hanover Township is a township in Crawford County, Iowa, USA. As of the 2000 census, its population was 226.

== Geography ==
Hanover Township covers an area of 35.74 square miles (92.6 km^{2}) and contains no incorporated settlements. According to the USGS, it contains one cemetery, Bockelmann Family.
