= Ar-We-Va Community School District =

Public school district in Westside, Iowa, United States

Coordinates: 42.075189°N 95.101278°W

Location
- Westside, Iowa Crawford and Carroll counties United States
- Coordinates: 42.075189, -95.101278

District information
- Type: Local school district
- Grades: K-12
- Established: 1956
- Superintendent: Nathan Hemiller
- Schools: 2
- Budget: $4,794,000 (2020-21)
- NCES District ID: 1903780

Students and staff
- Students: 243 (2022-23)
- Teachers: 17.71 FTE
- Staff: 20.36 FTE
- Student–teacher ratio: 13.72
- Athletic conference: Rolling Hills
- District mascot: Rockets
- Colors: Red, Black, and White

Other information
- Website: www.ar-we-va.k12.ia.us

The Ar-We-Va Community School District is a rural public school district based in Westside, Iowa. The district is split between Crawford County and Carroll County. The district serves the towns of Westside, Arcadia, and Vail, and the surrounding rural areas.

The school's mascot is the Rockets. Their colors are red, black, and white.

== Schools ==
The district operates two schools, both in Westside:

- Ar-We-Va Elementary School
- Ar-We-Va High School

== Ar-We-Va High School ==
=== Athletics ===
The Rockets compete in the Rolling Valley Conference in the following sports:

- Baseball
- Basketball
- Bowling (partners with Carroll Community School District)
- Cross Country
- Football
- Golf (partners with Carroll Community School District)
- Soccer (partners with Carroll Community School District)
- Swimming
- Softball
- Track and Field
- Trap Shooting
- Volleyball
- Wrestling

== See also ==
- List of school districts in Iowa
- List of high schools in Iowa
