= Denison Community School District =

Public school district in Denison, Iowa, United States

Location
- Denison, Iowa Crawford and Ida counties United States
- Coordinates: 42°01′39″N 95°20′58″W

District information
- Type: Local school district
- Grades: K-12
- Established: 1856; 170 years ago
- Superintendent: Michael Pardun
- Schools: 5
- Budget: $33,894,000 (2020-21)
- NCES District ID: 1908910

Students and staff
- Students: 2,264 (2022-23)
- Teachers: 146.54 FTE (2022-23)
- Staff: 154.37 FTE
- Student–teacher ratio: 15.45
- Athletic conference: Hawkeye 10
- District mascot: Monarchs
- Colors: Purple and gold

Other information
- Website: denison.k12.ia.us

The Denison Community School District is a rural public school district based in Denison, Iowa. The district is mainly in Crawford County, with a small area in Ida County. The district serves the towns of Denison, Buck Grove, Deloit, and Kiron, and the surrounding rural areas. The school's mascot is the Monarchs. Their colors are purple and gold.

== History ==
Since 1994, through a sharing agreement with Schleswig Community School District, students from Schleswig attend high school in Denison, and compete as Denison-Schleswig. Mike Pardun has been the superintendent since 2003.

== Schools ==
The district operates five schools, all in Denison:

- Broadway Elementary School
- Denison Elementary School
- Denison Middle School
- Denison High School
- Denison Alternative High School

== Denison High School ==
=== Athletics ===
The Monarchs compete in the Hawkeye 10 Conference in the following sports:

==== Fall sports ====
- Football
- Cross country (boys and girls)
- Volleyball

==== Winter sports ====
- Basketball (boys and girls)
  - Boys' 1978 Class 2A State Champions
- Bowling
  - Boys’ 2022 Class 2A State Champions
- Wrestling

==== Spring sports ====
- Golf (boys and girls)
- Soccer (boys and girls)
- Tennis (boys and girls)
  - Boys' - 1987 Class 1A State Champions
- Track and field (boys and girls)

==== Summer sports ====
- Baseball
  - 1994 Class 3A State Champions
- Softball

== See also ==
- List of school districts in Iowa
- List of high schools in Iowa
