= Charter Oak Township, Crawford County, Iowa =

Charter Oak Township
- Township
- Location in Crawford County
- Coordinates: 42°05′09″N 095°36′54″W
- Country: United States
- State: Iowa
- County: Crawford

Area
  - Total: 35.7 sq mi (92.5 km^{2})
  - Land: 35.70 sq mi (92.46 km^{2})
  - Water: 0.015 sq mi (0.04 km^{2}) 0.04%
- Elevation: 1,319 ft (402 m)

Population (2000)
  - Total: 757
  - Density: 21/sq mi (8.2/km^{2})
- GNIS feature ID: 0467594

Charter Oak Township is a township in Crawford County, Iowa, United States. As of the 2010 census, its population was 704.

== Geography ==
Charter Oak Township covers an area of 35.71 square miles (92.5 km^{2}) and contains one incorporated settlement, Charter Oak. According to the USGS, it contains four cemeteries: Charter Oak, Saint Boniface, Saint John and Saint Paul.

The stream of Emigrant Creek runs through this township.
