= Arion, Iowa =

- City
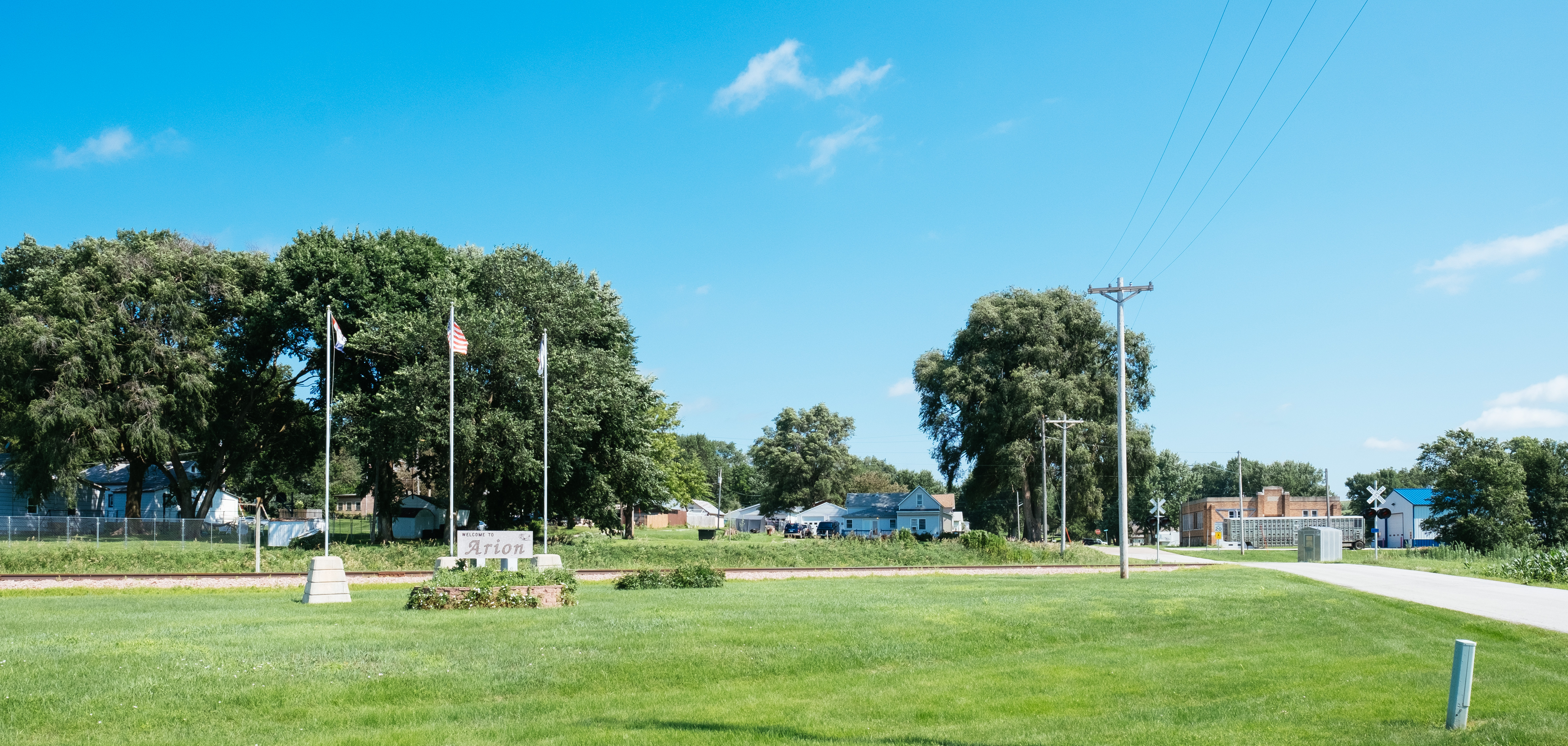
- Entrance to Arion

- Location of Arion, Iowa
- Coordinates: 41°56′52″N 95°27′44″W
- Country: United States
- State: Iowa
- County: Crawford

Area
  - Total: 0.50 sq mi (1.29 km^{2})
  - Land: 0.50 sq mi (1.29 km^{2})
  - Water: 0 sq mi (0.00 km^{2})
- Elevation: 1,135 ft (346 m)

Population (2020)
  - Total: 97
  - Density: 195.5/sq mi (75.47/km^{2})
- Time zone: UTC-6 (Central (CST))
  - Summer (DST): UTC-5 (CDT)
- ZIP code: 51520
- Area code: 712
- FIPS code: 19-02755
- GNIS feature ID: 2393983

Arion is a city in Crawford County, Iowa, United States, along the Boyer River. The population was 97 at the 2020 census.

== History ==
The community was named for Arion, an ancient Greek poet.

== Geography ==
According to the United States Census Bureau, the city has a total area of 0.48 square miles (1.24 km^{2}), all land.

== Demographics ==
Historical populations
Year	Pop.	±%
1900	192	—
1910	168	−12.5%
1920	242	+44.0%
1930	269	+11.2%
1940	271	+0.7%
1950	220	−18.8%
1960	201	−8.6%
1970	199	−1.0%
1980	207	+4.0%
1990	148	−28.5%
2000	136	−8.1%
2010	108	−20.6%
2020	97	−10.2%
Source:"U.S. Census website". United States Census Bureau. and Iowa Data Center; Source: U.S. Decennial Census

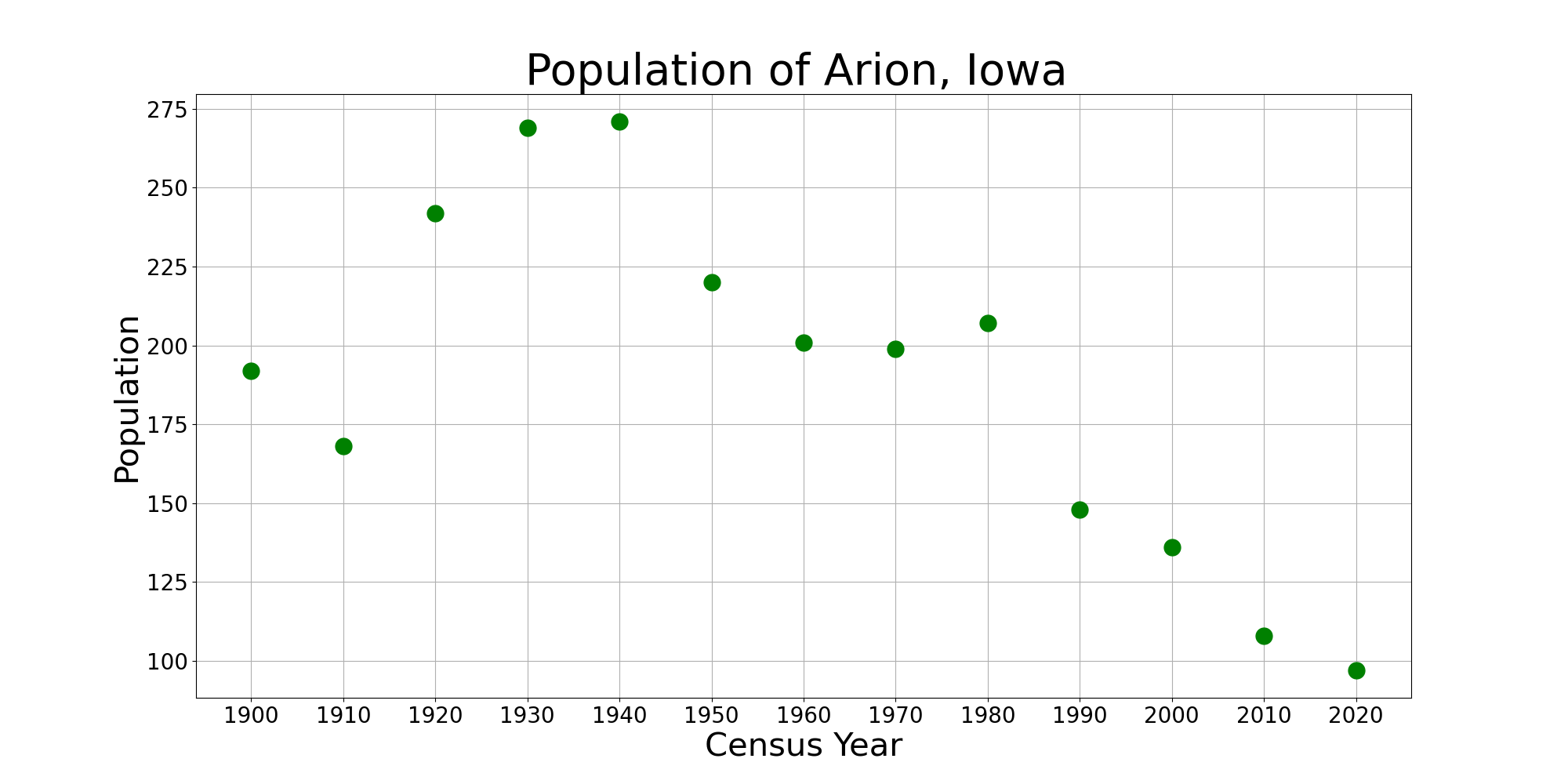
The population of Arion, Iowa from US census data

=== 2020 census ===
As of the census of 2020, there were 97 people, 47 households, and 28 families residing in the city. The population density was 195.5 inhabitants per square mile (75.5/km^{2}). There were 47 housing units at an average density of 94.7 per square mile (36.6/km^{2}). The racial makeup of the city was 91.8% White, 0.0% Black or African American, 0.0% Native American, 0.0% Asian, 0.0% Pacific Islander, 3.1% from other races and 5.2% from two or more races. Hispanic or Latino persons of any race comprised 6.2% of the population.

Of the 47 households, 27.7% of which had children under the age of 18 living with them, 46.8% were married couples living together, 10.6% were cohabitating couples, 14.9% had a female householder with no spouse or partner present and 27.7% had a male householder with no spouse or partner present. 40.4% of all households were non-families. 29.8% of all households were made up of individuals, 8.5% had someone living alone who was 65 years old or older.

The median age in the city was 40.4 years. 27.8% of the residents were under the age of 20; 7.2% were between the ages of 20 and 24; 22.7% were from 25 and 44; 20.6% were from 45 and 64; and 21.6% were 65 years of age or older. The gender makeup of the city was 57.7% male and 42.3% female.

=== 2010 census ===
As of the census of 2010, there were 108 people, 43 households, and 26 families living in the city. The population density was 225.0 inhabitants per square mile (86.9/km^{2}). There were 48 housing units at an average density of 100.0 per square mile (38.6/km^{2}). The racial makeup of the city was 90.7% White, 6.5% from other races, and 2.8% from two or more races. Hispanic or Latino of any race were 8.3% of the population.

There were 43 households, of which 27.9% had children under the age of 18 living with them, 48.8% were married couples living together, 9.3% had a female householder with no husband present, 2.3% had a male householder with no wife present, and 39.5% were non-families. 30.2% of all households were made up of individuals, and 11.6% had someone living alone who was 65 years of age or older. The average household size was 2.51 and the average family size was 3.00.

The median age in the city was 38 years. 25% of residents were under the age of 18; 6.6% were between the ages of 18 and 24; 24.9% were from 25 to 44; 31.5% were from 45 to 64; and 12% were 65 years of age or older. The gender makeup of the city was 53.7% male and 46.3% female.

=== 2000 census ===
As of the census of 2000, there were 136 people, 56 households, and 38 families living in the city. The population density was 286.4 inhabitants per square mile (110.6/km^{2}). There were 61 housing units at an average density of 128.4 per square mile (49.6/km^{2}). The racial makeup of the city was 92.65% White, 0.74% Native American, 3.68% from other races, and 2.94% from two or more races. Hispanic or Latino of any race were 8.09% of the population.

There were 56 households, out of which 32.1% had children under the age of 18 living with them, 44.6% were married couples living together, 7.1% had a female householder with no husband present, and 32.1% were non-families. 25.0% of all households were made up of individuals, and 1.8% had someone living alone who was 65 years of age or older. The average household size was 2.43 and the average family size was 2.71.

22.8% are under the age of 18, 10.3% from 18 to 24, 30.1% from 25 to 44, 25.7% from 45 to 64, and 11.0% who were 65 years of age or older. The median age was 38 years. For every 100 females, there were 106.1 males. For every 100 females age 18 and over, there were 118.8 males.

The median income for a household in the city was $33,750, and the median income for a family was $36,250. Males had a median income of $26,250 versus $18,750 for females. The per capita income for the city was $12,654. There were 23.3% of families and 27.7% of the population living below the poverty line, including 38.6% of under eighteens and 50.0% of those over 64.

== Education ==
Boyer Valley Community School District operates public schools serving the community. It was a part of the Dow City-Arion Community School District until July 1, 1994, when it merged into the Boyer Valley district.
