= Buck Grove, Iowa =

- City
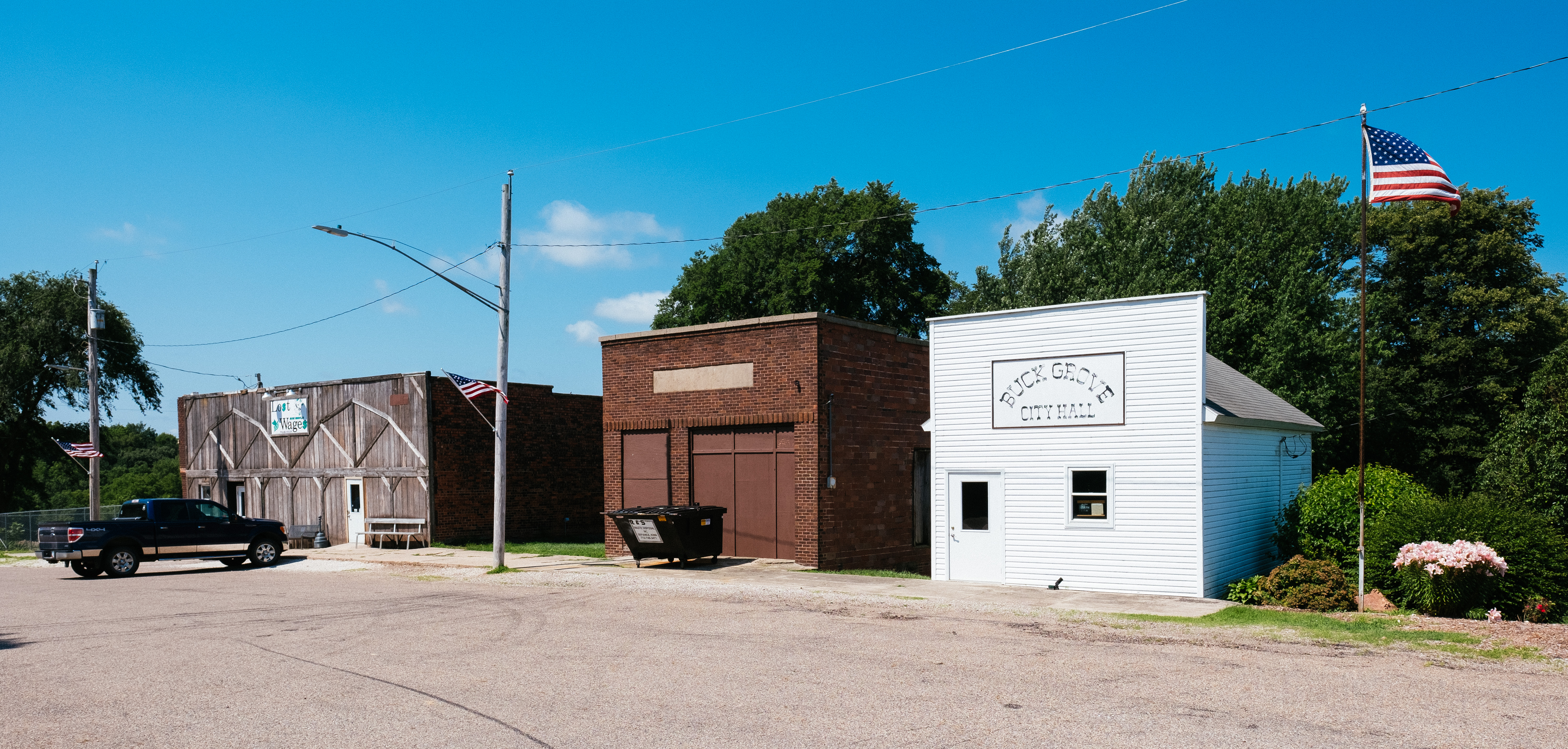
- Main Street

- Location of Buck Grove, Iowa
- Coordinates: 41°55′04″N 95°23′43″W
- Country: United States
- State: Iowa
- County: Crawford

Area
  - Total: 0.37 sq mi (0.96 km^{2})
  - Land: 0.37 sq mi (0.96 km^{2})
  - Water: 0 sq mi (0.00 km^{2})
- Elevation: 1,240 ft (380 m)

Population (2020)
  - Total: 34
  - Density: 92.1/sq mi (35.57/km^{2})
- Time zone: UTC-6 (Central (CST))
  - Summer (DST): UTC-5 (CDT)
- ZIP code: 51528
- Area code: 712
- FIPS code: 19-09145
- GNIS feature ID: 2393446

Buck Grove is a city in Crawford County, Iowa, United States. The population was 34 at the 2020 census.

== Geography ==
According to the United States Census Bureau, the city has a total area of 0.36 square miles (0.93 km^{2}), all land.

== Demographics ==
Historical populations
| Year | Pop. | ±% |
|---|---|---|
| 1910 | 140 | — |
| 1920 | 188 | +34.3% |
| 1930 | 219 | +16.5% |
| 1940 | 194 | −11.4% |
| 1950 | 192 | −1.0% |
| 1960 | 190 | −1.0% |
| 1970 | 143 | −24.7% |
| 1980 | 154 | +7.7% |
| 1990 | 105 | −31.8% |
| 2000 | 49 | −53.3% |
| 2010 | 43 | −12.2% |
| 2020 | 34 | −20.9% |
Source:"U.S. Census website". United States Census Bureau. and Iowa Data Center; Source: U.S. Decennial Census

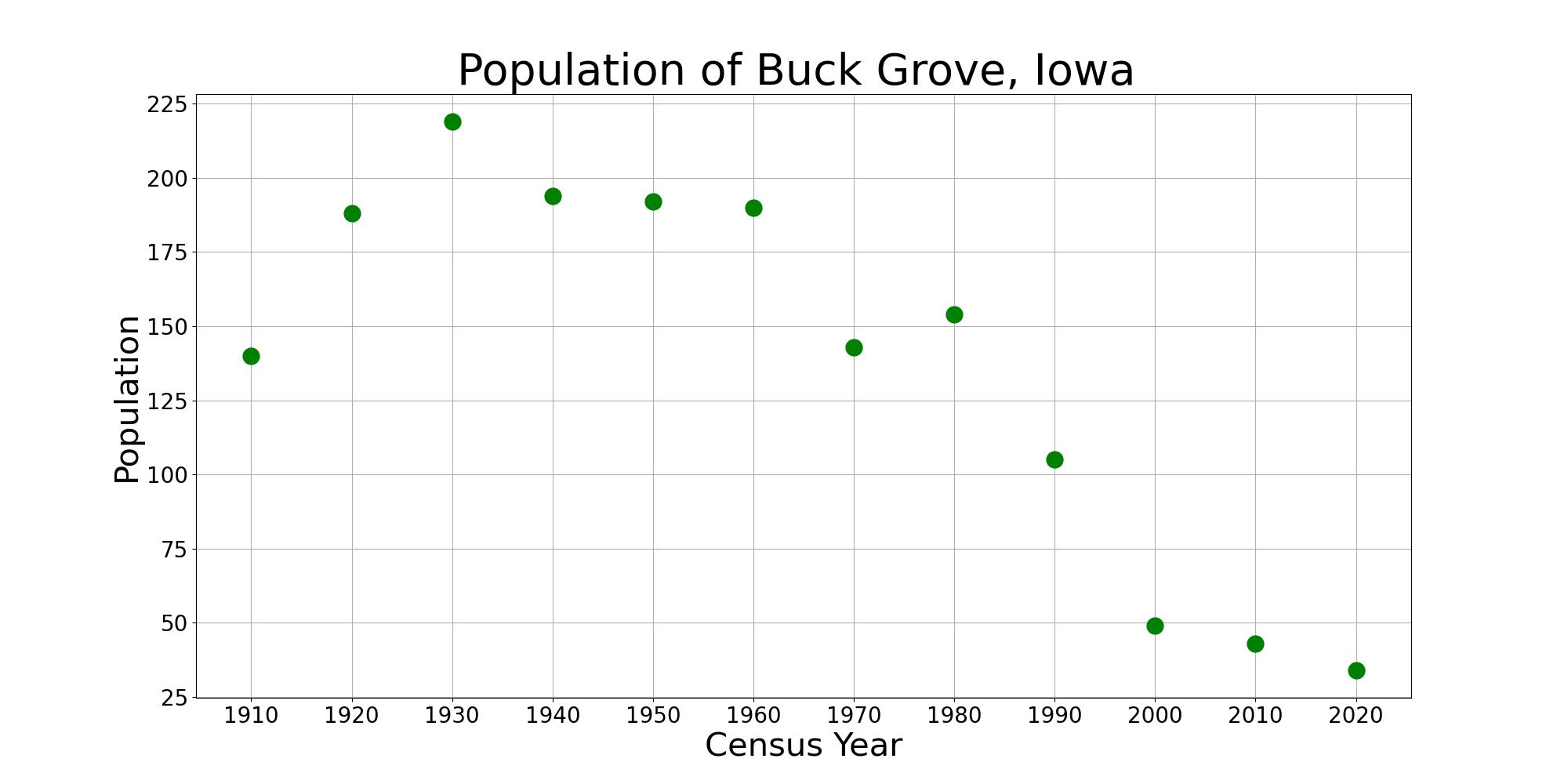
The population of Buck Grove, Iowa from US census data

=== 2020 census ===
As of the census of 2020, there were 34 people, 17 households, and 14 families residing in the city. The population density was 92.1 inhabitants per square mile (35.6/km^{2}). There were 17 housing units at an average density of 46.1 per square mile (17.8/km^{2}). The racial makeup of the city was 88.2% White, 0.0% Black or African American, 0.0% Native American, 0.0% Asian, 0.0% Pacific Islander, 2.9% from other races and 8.8% from two or more races. Hispanic or Latino persons of any race comprised 11.8% of the population.

Of the 17 households, 64.7% of which had children under the age of 18 living with them, 41.2% were married couples living together, 23.5% were cohabitating couples, 35.3% had a female householder with no spouse or partner present and 0.0% had a male householder with no spouse or partner present. 17.6% of all households were non-families. 11.8% of all households were made up of individuals, 5.9% had someone living alone who was 65 years old or older.

The median age in the city was 45.0 years. 29.4% of the residents were under the age of 20; 2.9% were between the ages of 20 and 24; 17.6% were from 25 and 44; 26.5% were from 45 and 64; and 23.5% were 65 years of age or older. The gender makeup of the city was 61.8% male and 38.2% female.

=== 2010 census ===
As of the census of 2010, there were 43 people, 18 households, and 12 families living in the city. The population density was 119.4 inhabitants per square mile (46.1/km^{2}). There were 19 housing units at an average density of 52.8 per square mile (20.4/km^{2}). The racial makeup of the city was 100.0% White.

There were 18 households, of which 33.3% had children under the age of 18 living with them, 61.1% were married couples living together, 5.6% had a male householder with no wife present, and 33.3% were non-families. 27.8% of all households were made up of individuals, and 5.6% had someone living alone who was 65 years of age or older. The average household size was 2.39 and the average family size was 3.00.

The median age in the city was 51.5 years. 27.9% of residents were under the age of 18; 0.0% were between the ages of 18 and 24; 18.6% were from 25 to 44; 30.2% were from 45 to 64; and 23.3% were 65 years of age or older. The gender makeup of the city was 55.8% male and 44.2% female.

=== 2000 census ===
As of the census of 2000, there were 49 people, 20 households, and 13 families living in the city. The population density was 133.6 inhabitants per square mile (51.6/km^{2}). There were 21 housing units at an average density of 57.3 per square mile (22.1/km^{2}). The racial makeup of the city was 100.00% White.

There were 20 households, out of which 25.0% had children under the age of 18 living with them, 60.0% were married couples living together, 5.0% had a female householder with no husband present, and 35.0% were non-families. 30.0% of all households were made up of individuals, and 15.0% had someone living alone who was 65 years of age or older. The average household size was 2.45 and the average family size was 2.77.

In the city, the population was spread out, with 20.4% under the age of 18, 6.1% from 18 to 24, 34.7% from 25 to 44, 28.6% from 45 to 64, and 10.2% who were 65 years of age or older. The median age was 42 years. For every 100 females, there were 122.7 males. For every 100 females age 18 and over, there were 116.7 males.

The median income for a household in the city was $25,417, and the median income for a family was $38,750. Males had a median income of $23,906 versus $18,750 for females. The per capita income for the city was $14,492. There were no families and 10.0% of the population living below the poverty line, including no under eighteens and none of those over 64.

== Education ==
The Denison Community School District operates area public schools.
