= Westside, Iowa =

- City
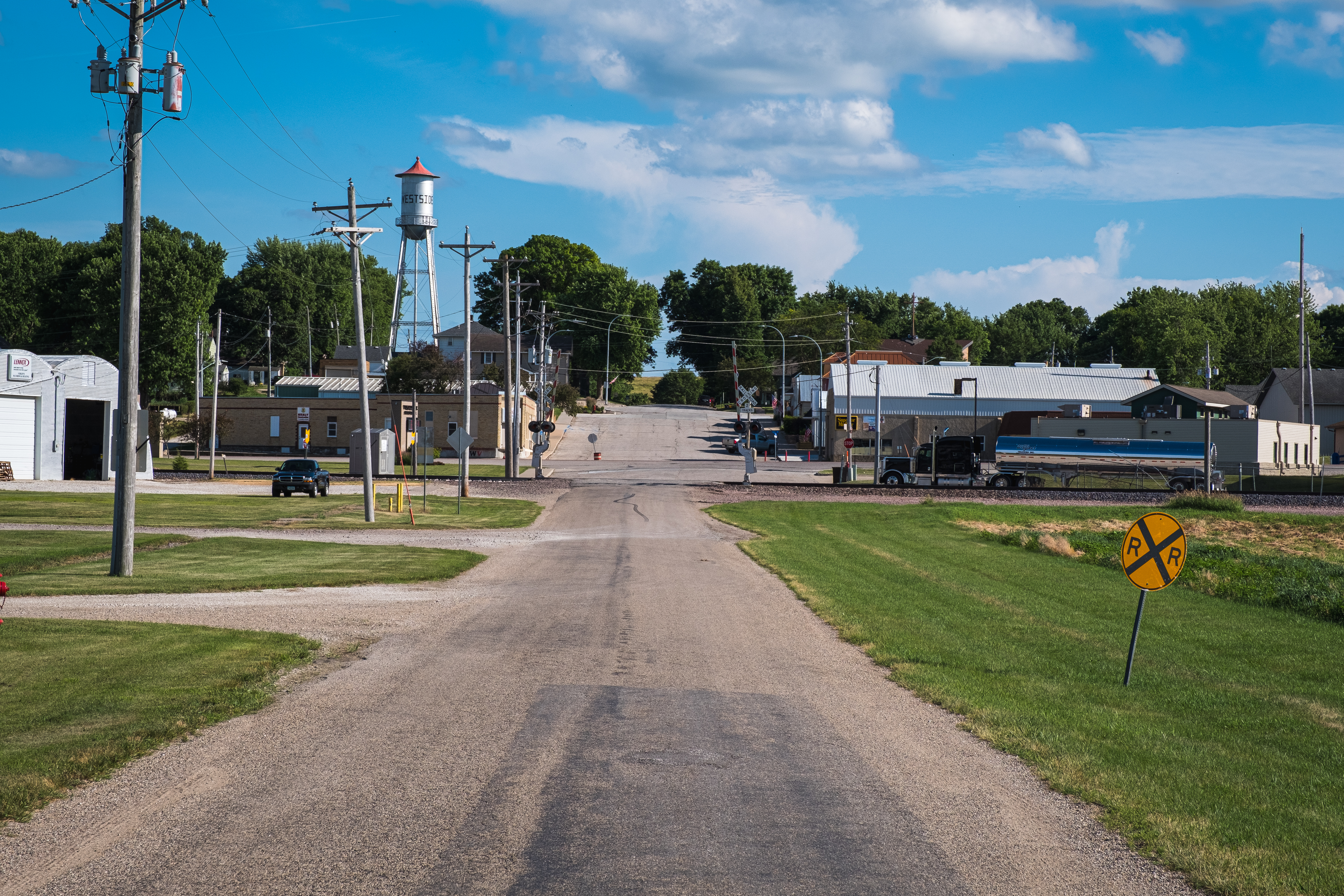
- A view of Westside off of North Main Street

- Location of Westside, Iowa
- Coordinates: 42°04′33″N 95°06′05″W
- Country: United States
- State: Iowa
- County: Crawford

Area
  - Total: 1.47 sq mi (3.81 km^{2})
  - Land: 1.47 sq mi (3.81 km^{2})
  - Water: 0 sq mi (0.00 km^{2})
- Elevation: 1,345 ft (410 m)

Population (2020)
  - Total: 285
  - Density: 193.8/sq mi (74.81/km^{2})
- Time zone: UTC-6 (Central (CST))
  - Summer (DST): UTC-5 (CDT)
- ZIP code: 51467
- Area code: 712
- FIPS code: 19-84630
- GNIS feature ID: 2397287
- Website: www.cityofwestside.com

Westside is a city in Crawford County, Iowa, United States. The population was 285 at the time of the 2020 census.

== History ==
Westside was laid out in 1872. The city name is derived from its presence slightly to the west of the divide between the Mississippi and Missouri river watersheds.

== Geography ==
According to the United States Census Bureau, the city has a total area of 1.47 square miles (3.81 km^{2}), all land.

== Demographics ==
Historical populations
Year	Pop.	±%
1880	446	—
1890	448	+0.4%
1900	396	−11.6%
1910	367	−7.3%
1920	405	+10.4%
1930	341	−15.8%
1940	373	+9.4%
1950	393	+5.4%
1960	367	−6.6%
1970	389	+6.0%
1980	387	−0.5%
1990	348	−10.1%
2000	327	−6.0%
2010	299	−8.6%
2020	285	−4.7%
Source:"U.S. Census website". United States Census Bureau. and Iowa Data Center; Source: U.S. Decennial Census

=== 2020 census ===
As of the census of 2020, there were 285 people, 141 households, and 76 families residing in the city. The population density was 193.7 inhabitants per square mile (74.8/km^{2}). There were 147 housing units at an average density of 99.9 per square mile (38.6/km^{2}). The racial makeup of the city was 96.1% White, 0.4% Black or African American, 0.0% Native American, 0.7% Asian, 0.0% Pacific Islander, 1.8% from other races and 1.1% from two or more races. Hispanic or Latino persons of any race comprised 2.1% of the population.

Of the 141 households, 19.1% of which had children under the age of 18 living with them, 39.0% were married couples living together, 8.5% were cohabitating couples, 27.0% had a female householder with no spouse or partner present and 25.5% had a male householder with no spouse or partner present. 46.1% of all households were non-families. 39.0% of all households were made up of individuals, 22.0% had someone living alone who was 65 years old or older.

The median age in the city was 48.9 years. 17.2% of the residents were under the age of 20; 4.2% were between the ages of 20 and 24; 23.2% were from 25 and 44; 28.4% were from 45 and 64; and 27.0% were 65 years of age or older. The gender makeup of the city was 51.6% male and 48.4% female.

=== 2010 census ===
As of the census of 2010, there were 299 people, 143 households, and 91 families living in the city. The population density was 203.4 inhabitants per square mile (78.5/km^{2}). There were 150 housing units at an average density of 102.0 per square mile (39.4/km^{2}). The racial makeup of the city was 99.3% White, 0.3% from other races, and 0.3% from two or more races. Hispanic or Latino of any race were 2.3% of the population.

There were 143 households, of which 21.0% had children under the age of 18 living with them, 55.9% were married couples living together, 4.2% had a female householder with no husband present, 3.5% had a male householder with no wife present, and 36.4% were non-families. 33.6% of all households were made up of individuals, and 19.6% had someone living alone who was 65 years of age or older. The average household size was 2.09 and the average family size was 2.60.

The median age in the city was 52.3 years. 17.4% of residents were under the age of 18; 5.6% were between the ages of 18 and 24; 16.8% were from 25 to 44; 29.8% were from 45 to 64; and 30.4% were 65 years of age or older. The gender makeup of the city was 48.5% male and 51.5% female.

=== 2000 census ===
As of the census of 2000, there were 327 people, 146 households, and 109 families living in the city. The population density was 220.8 inhabitants per square mile (85.3/km^{2}). There were 154 housing units at an average density of 104.0 per square mile (40.2/km^{2}). The racial makeup of the city was 100.00% White.

There were 146 households, out of which 24.0% had children under the age of 18 living with them, 68.5% were married couples living together, 2.1% had a female householder with no husband present, and 25.3% were non-families. 23.3% of all households were made up of individuals, and 12.3% had someone living alone who was 65 years of age or older. The average household size was 2.24 and the average family size was 2.60.

19.9% are under the age of 18, 4.0% from 18 to 24, 22.0% from 25 to 44, 28.7% from 45 to 64, and 25.4% who were 65 years of age or older. The median age was 47 years. For every 100 females, there were 90.1 males. For every 100 females age 18 and over, there were 98.5 males.

The median income for a household in the city was $37,250, and the median income for a family was $40,357. Males had a median income of $32,500 versus $18,125 for females. The per capita income for the city was $31,545. About 2.5% of families and 3.1% of the population were below the poverty line, including none of those under the age of eighteen or sixty-five or over.

== Education ==
The Ar-We-Va Community School District operates local area schools.
