= Kiron, Iowa =

- City
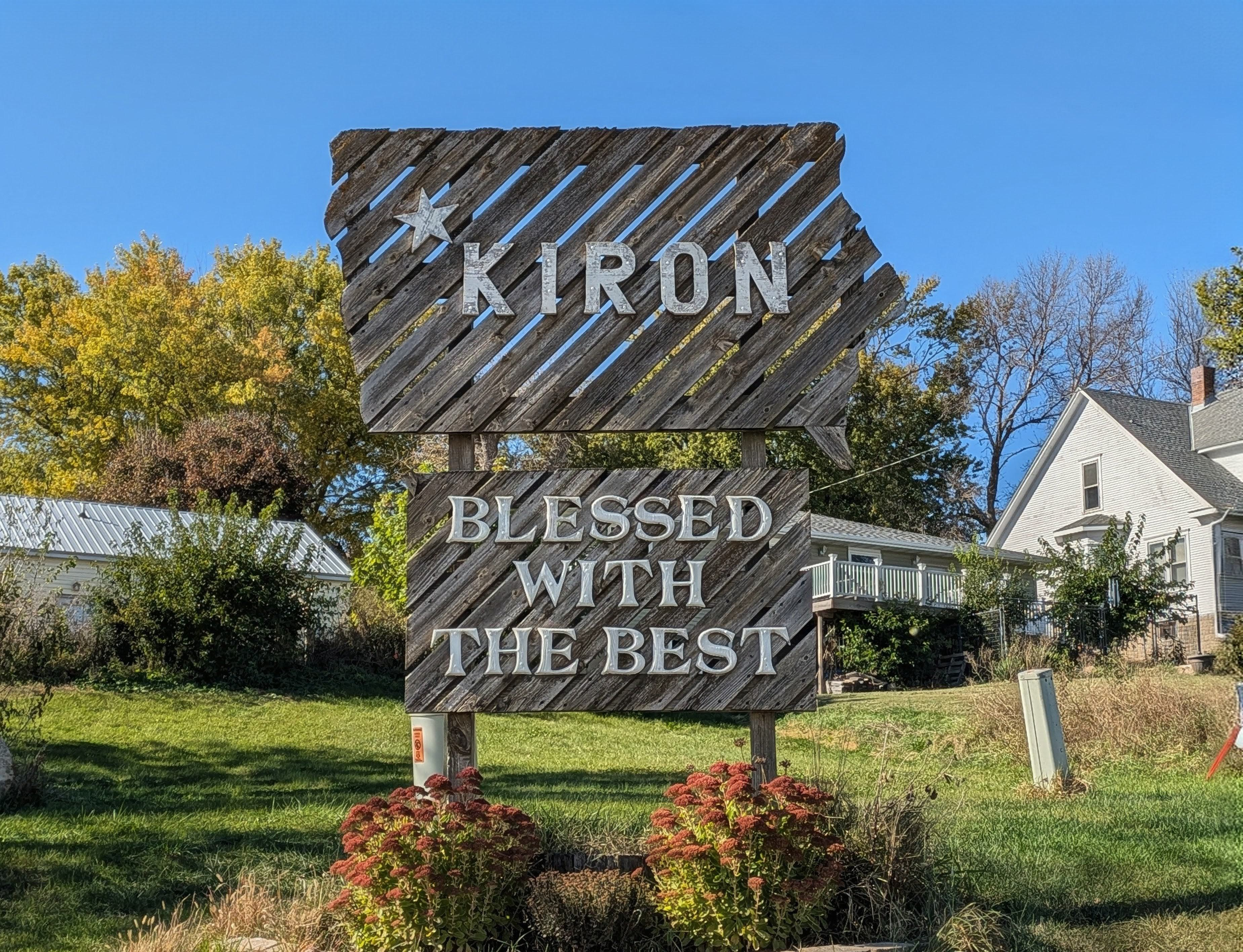
- City sign in Kiron

- Location of Kiron, Iowa
- Coordinates: 42°11′39″N 95°19′37″W
- Country: United States
- State: Iowa
- County: Crawford

Area
  - Total: 0.20 sq mi (0.52 km^{2})
  - Land: 0.20 sq mi (0.52 km^{2})
  - Water: 0 sq mi (0.00 km^{2})
- Elevation: 1,335 ft (407 m)

Population (2020)
  - Total: 267
  - Density: 1,321.3/sq mi (510.16/km^{2})
- Time zone: UTC-6 (Central (CST))
  - Summer (DST): UTC-5 (CDT)
- ZIP code: 51448
- Area code: 712
- FIPS code: 19-41610
- GNIS feature ID: 2395550
- Website: kironiowa.com

Kiron is a city in Crawford County, Iowa, United States. The population was 267 at the time of the 2020 census.

== History ==
Kiron was platted in 1899. It was supposedly named after a place in China.

Another popular etymology theory is that the town was named after the Kidron Valley, in the Bible, but due to a typographical error, the D had been omitted.

== Geography ==
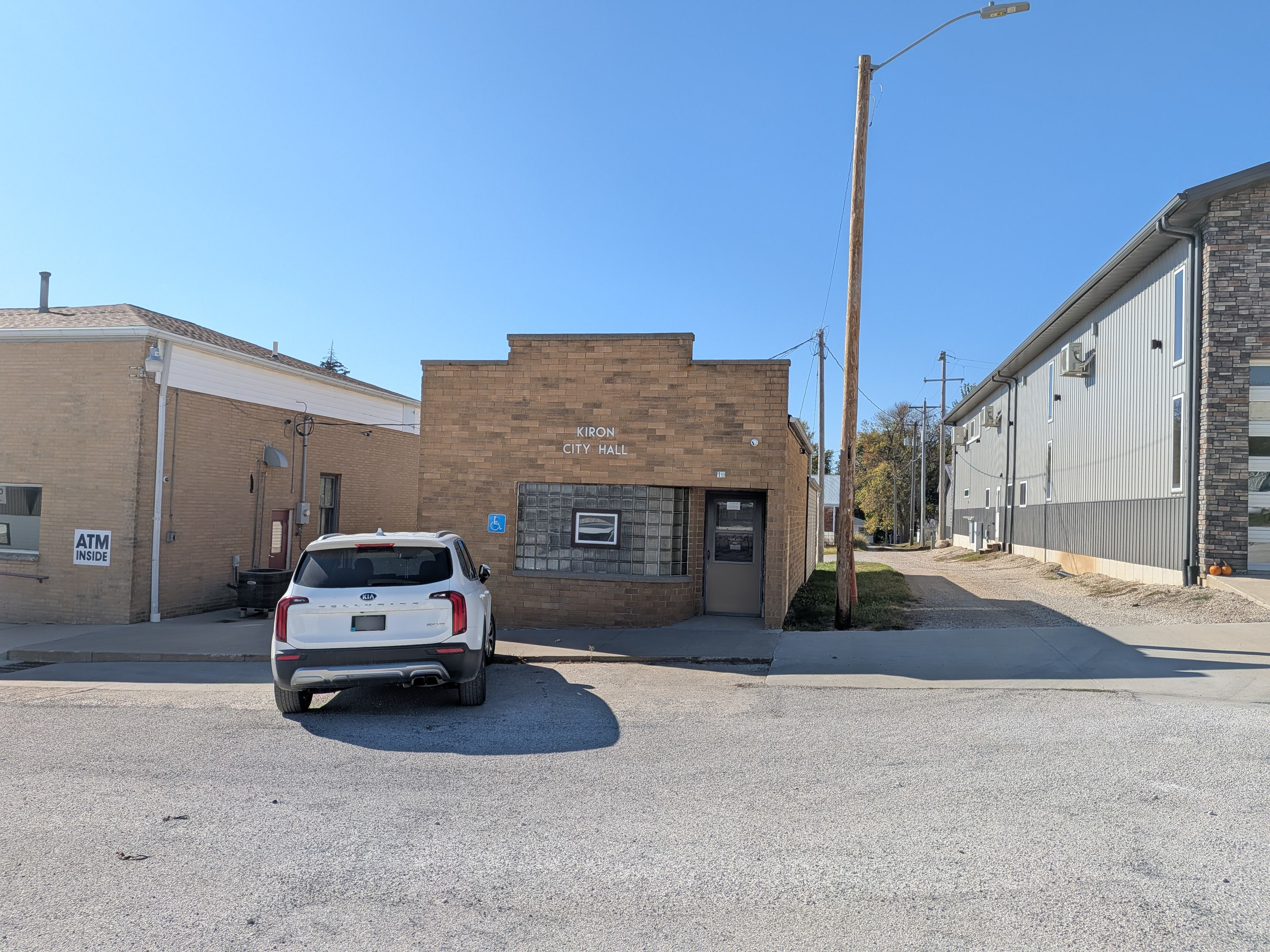
Kiron City Hall

According to the United States Census Bureau, the city has a total area of 0.21 square miles (0.54 km^{2}), all land.

Kiron is six miles east of U.S. Route 59 at Iowa Highway 39.

== Demographics ==
Historical populations
Year	Pop.	±%
1900	89	—
1910	207	+132.6%
1920	294	+42.0%
1930	259	−11.9%
1940	260	+0.4%
1950	255	−1.9%
1960	271	+6.3%
1970	275	+1.5%
1980	317	+15.3%
1990	301	−5.0%
2000	273	−9.3%
2010	279	+2.2%
2020	267	−4.3%
Source:"U.S. Census website". United States Census Bureau. and Iowa Data Center; Source: U.S. Decennial Census

=== 2020 census ===
As of the census of 2020, there were 267 people, 118 households, and 80 families residing in the city. The population density was 1,321.3 inhabitants per square mile (510.2/km^{2}). There were 124 housing units at an average density of 613.6 per square mile (236.9/km^{2}). The racial makeup of the city was 87.3% White, 3.7% Black or African American, 0.4% Native American, 0.0% Asian, 0.0% Pacific Islander, 4.5% from other races and 4.1% from two or more races. Hispanic or Latino persons of any race comprised 7.9% of the population.

Of the 118 households, 22.9% of which had children under the age of 18 living with them, 55.9% were married couples living together, 9.3% were cohabitating couples, 17.8% had a female householder with no spouse or partner present and 16.9% had a male householder with no spouse or partner present. 32.2% of all households were non-families. 26.3% of all households were made up of individuals, 10.2% had someone living alone who was 65 years old or older.

The median age in the city was 40.3 years. 28.1% of the residents were under the age of 20; 2.6% were between the ages of 20 and 24; 22.8% were from 25 and 44; 20.2% were from 45 and 64; and 26.2% were 65 years of age or older. The gender makeup of the city was 46.1% male and 53.9% female.

=== 2010 census ===
As of the census of 2010, there were 279 people, 121 households, and 77 families living in the city. The population density was 1,328.6 inhabitants per square mile (513.0/km^{2}). There were 134 housing units at an average density of 638.1 per square mile (246.4/km^{2}). The racial makeup of the city was 91.4% White, 8.2% from other races, and 0.4% from two or more races. Hispanic or Latino of any race were 16.1% of the population.

There were 121 households, of which 24.8% had children under the age of 18 living with them, 47.9% were married couples living together, 8.3% had a female householder with no husband present, 7.4% had a male householder with no wife present, and 36.4% were non-families. 28.9% of all households were made up of individuals, and 13.2% had someone living alone who was 65 years of age or older. The average household size was 2.31 and the average family size was 2.74.

The median age in the city was 46.6 years. 21.9% of residents were under the age of 18; 6.4% were between the ages of 18 and 24; 20.5% were from 25 to 44; 28.3% were from 45 to 64; and 22.9% were 65 years of age or older. The gender makeup of the city was 52.0% male and 48.0% female.

=== 2000 census ===
As of the census of 2000, there were 273 people, 126 households, and 75 families living in the city. The population density was 1,337.6 inhabitants per square mile (516.5/km^{2}). There were 136 housing units at an average density of 666.3 per square mile (257.3/km^{2}). The racial makeup of the city was 95.24% White, 1.47% Native American, 2.20% from other races, and 1.10% from two or more races. Hispanic or Latino of any race were 2.56% of the population.

There were 126 households, out of which 23.0% had children under the age of 18 living with them, 49.2% were married couples living together, 8.7% had a female householder with no husband present, and 39.7% were non-families. 35.7% of all households were made up of individuals, and 20.6% had someone living alone who was 65 years of age or older. The average household size was 2.17 and the average family size was 2.76.

In the city, the population was spread out, with 23.1% under the age of 18, 6.2% from 18 to 24, 17.9% from 25 to 44, 29.3% from 45 to 64, and 23.4% who were 65 years of age or older. The median age was 46 years. For every 100 females, there were 96.4 males. For every 100 females age 18 and over, there were 96.3 males.

The median income for a household in the city was $31,429, and the median income for a family was $34,861. Males had a median income of $28,750 versus $17,500 for females. The per capita income for the city was $16,061. About 11.3% of families and 14.7% of the population were below the poverty line, including 20.3% of those under the age of eighteen and 7.9% of those 65 or over.

== Education ==
The Denison Community School District operates area public schools.

== Notable people ==
- Steve King, U.S. Representative
