= Nishnabotny Township, Crawford County, Iowa =

Nishnabotny Township
- Township
- Location in Crawford County
- Coordinates: 41°54′29″N 095°15′54″W
- Country: United States
- State: Iowa
- County: Crawford

Area
  - Total: 36.18 sq mi (93.71 km^{2})
  - Land: 36.1 sq mi (93.6 km^{2})
  - Water: 0.042 sq mi (0.11 km^{2}) 0.12%
- Elevation: 1,380 ft (420 m)

Population (2000)
  - Total: 1,094
  - Density: 30/sq mi (11.7/km^{2})
- GNIS feature ID: 0468443

Nishnabotny Township is a township in Crawford County, Iowa, USA. As of the 2000 census, its population was 1,094.

== Geography ==
Nishnabotny Township covers an area of 36.18 square miles (93.7 km^{2}) and contains one incorporated settlement, Manilla. According to the USGS, it contains three cemeteries: Emmanuel Evangelical, Mount Olivet and Nishnabotna.
