= Dow City, Iowa =

- City
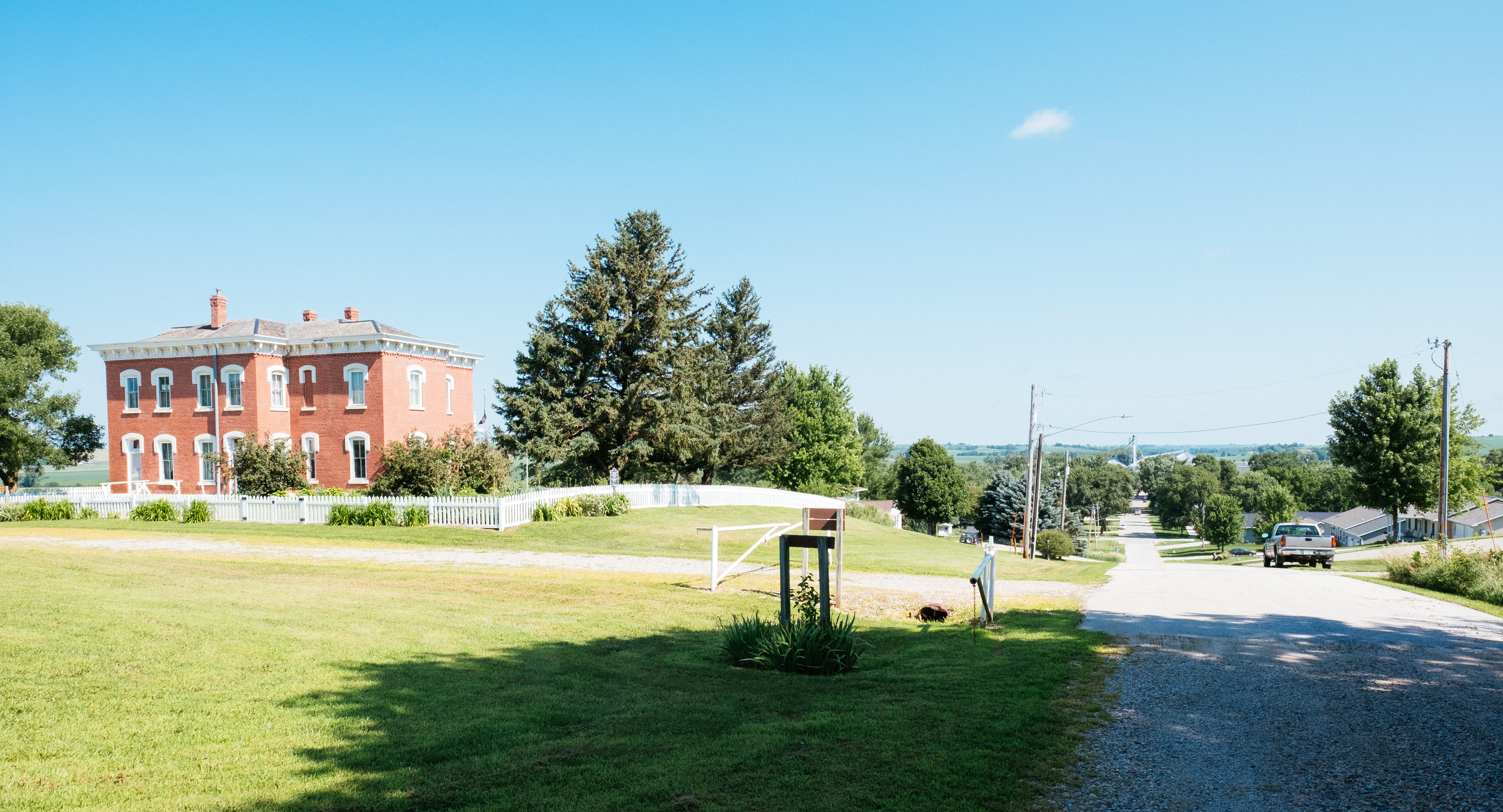
- Dow House Historical Site in Dow City

- Location of Dow City, Iowa
- Coordinates: 41°55′36″N 95°29′40″W
- Country: United States
- State: Iowa
- County: Crawford

Area
  - Total: 0.33 sq mi (0.86 km^{2})
  - Land: 0.33 sq mi (0.86 km^{2})
  - Water: 0 sq mi (0.00 km^{2})
- Elevation: 1,142 ft (348 m)

Population (2020)
  - Total: 485
  - Density: 1,453.3/sq mi (561.14/km^{2})
- Time zone: UTC-6 (Central (CST))
  - Summer (DST): UTC-5 (CDT)
- ZIP code: 51528
- Area code: 712
- FIPS code: 19-22215
- GNIS feature ID: 2394557

Dow City is a city in Crawford County, Iowa, United States, along the Boyer River. The population was 485 at the time of the 2020 census.

== History ==
Judge S. E. Dow settled at what is now Dow City in 1855. In 1869, he laid out the town in anticipation of the railroad being built through the settlement. The railroad depot was built in 1870.

Dow City is the location of the historic Dow House, which was built in 1872.

== Geography ==
According to the United States Census Bureau, the city has a total area of 0.32 square miles (0.83 km^{2}), all land.

Dow City is located on U.S. Route 30 and is thirty miles north of Interstate 80.

== Demographics ==
Historical populations
Year	Pop.	±%
1880	291	—
1890	451	+55.0%
1900	462	+2.4%
1910	462	+0.0%
1920	572	+23.8%
1930	588	+2.8%
1940	642	+9.2%
1950	524	−18.4%
1960	531	+1.3%
1970	571	+7.5%
1980	616	+7.9%
1990	439	−28.7%
2000	503	+14.6%
2010	510	+1.4%
2020	485	−4.9%
Source:"U.S. Census website". United States Census Bureau. and Iowa Data Center; Source: U.S. Decennial Census

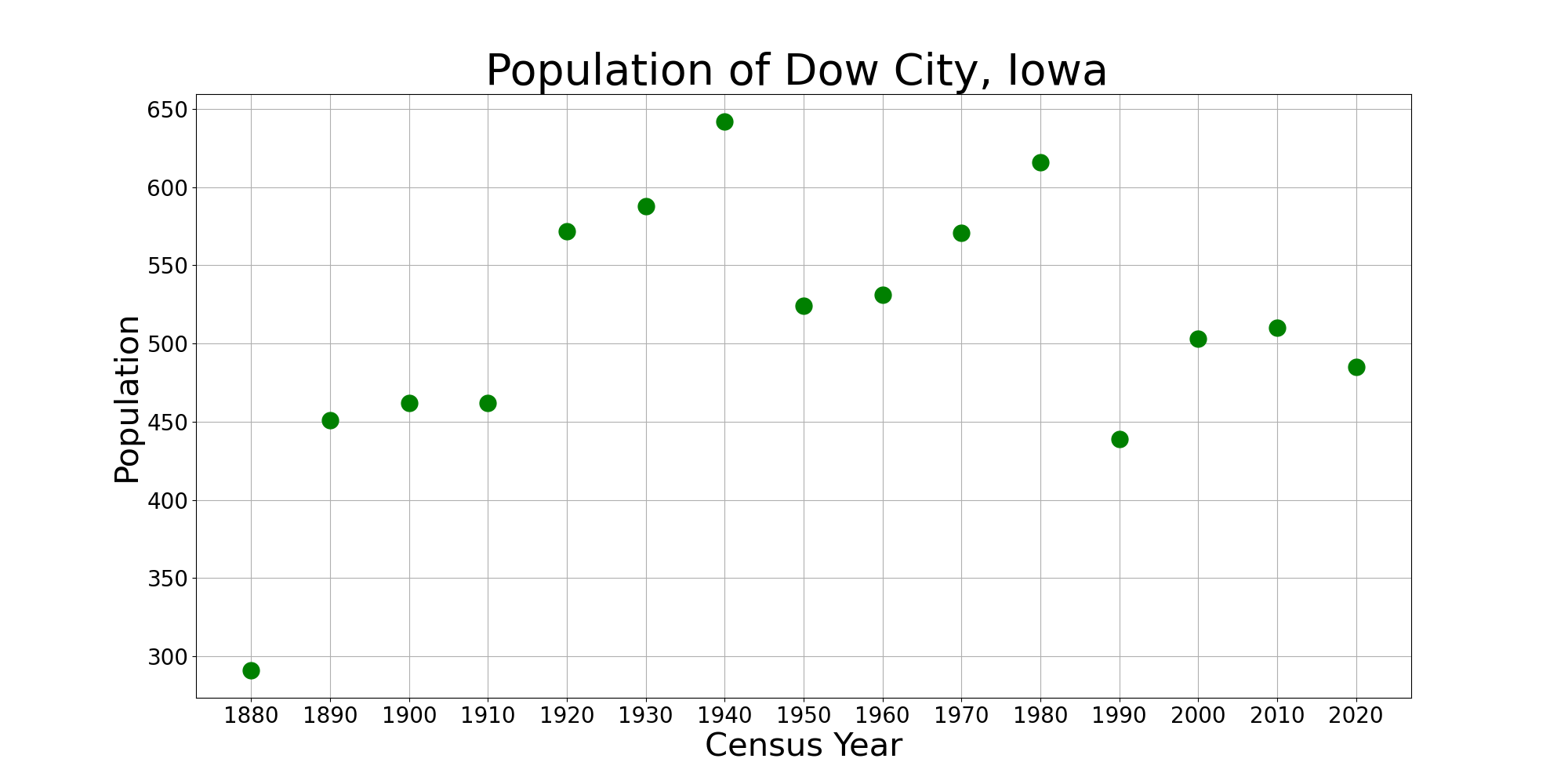
The population of Dow City, Iowa from US census data

=== 2020 census ===
As of the census of 2020, there were 485 people, 211 households, and 130 families residing in the city. The population density was 1,453.4 inhabitants per square mile (561.1/km^{2}). There were 228 housing units at an average density of 683.2 per square mile (263.8/km^{2}). The racial makeup of the city was 89.1% White, 0.2% Black or African American, 0.2% Native American, 0.0% Asian, 0.0% Pacific Islander, 3.7% from other races and 6.8% from two or more races. Hispanic or Latino persons of any race comprised 11.5% of the population.

Of the 211 households, 30.3% of which had children under the age of 18 living with them, 37.9% were married couples living together, 8.5% were cohabitating couples, 31.3% had a female householder with no spouse or partner present and 22.3% had a male householder with no spouse or partner present. 38.4% of all households were non-families. 32.7% of all households were made up of individuals, 16.6% had someone living alone who was 65 years old or older.

The median age in the city was 41.1 years. 27.2% of the residents were under the age of 20; 6.8% were between the ages of 20 and 24; 20.2% were from 25 and 44; 23.9% were from 45 and 64; and 21.9% were 65 years of age or older. The gender makeup of the city was 52.4% male and 47.6% female.

=== 2010 census ===
As of the census of 2010, there were 510 people, 219 households, and 137 families living in the city. The population density was 1,593.8 inhabitants per square mile (615.4/km^{2}). There were 242 housing units at an average density of 756.3 per square mile (292.0/km^{2}). The racial makeup of the city was 93.1% White, 0.2% Native American, 6.1% from other races, and 0.6% from two or more races. Hispanic or Latino of any race were 9.0% of the population.

There were 219 households, of which 28.3% had children under the age of 18 living with them, 48.4% were married couples living together, 9.1% had a female householder with no husband present, 5.0% had a male householder with no wife present, and 37.4% were non-families. 31.5% of all households were made up of individuals, and 16% had someone living alone who was 65 years of age or older. The average household size was 2.33 and the average family size was 2.95.

The median age in the city was 42.4 years. 24.1% of residents were under the age of 18; 7% were between the ages of 18 and 24; 21.4% were from 25 to 44; 28.3% were from 45 to 64; and 19.4% were 65 years of age or older. The gender makeup of the city was 50.4% male and 49.6% female.

=== 2000 census ===
As of the census of 2000, there were 503 people, 227 households, and 142 families living in the city. The population density was 1,578.3 inhabitants per square mile (609.4/km^{2}). There were 248 housing units at an average density of 778.2 per square mile (300.5/km^{2}). The racial makeup of the city was 96.82% White, 1.19% Asian, 1.19% from other races, and 0.80% from two or more races. Hispanic or Latino of any race were 1.59% of the population.

There were 227 households, out of which 23.3% had children under the age of 18 living with them, 50.2% were married couples living together, 7.5% had a female householder with no husband present, and 37.4% were non-families. 31.3% of all households were made up of individuals, and 14.1% had someone living alone who was 65 years of age or older. The average household size was 2.22 and the average family size was 2.75.

In the city, the population was spread out, with 19.5% under the age of 18, 8.3% from 18 to 24, 24.1% from 25 to 44, 26.4% from 45 to 64, and 21.7% who were 65 years of age or older. The median age was 44 years. For every 100 females, there were 100.4 males. For every 100 females age 18 and over, there were 91.0 males.

The median income for a household in the city was $30,547, and the median income for a family was $37,813. Males had a median income of $30,104 versus $17,000 for females. The per capita income for the city was $18,108. About 2.9% of families and 8.0% of the population were below the poverty line, including 4.3% of those under age 18 and 10.0% of those age 65 or over.

== Education ==
Boyer Valley Community School District operates public schools serving the community. It was a part of the Dow City-Arion Community School District until July 1, 1994, when it merged into the Boyer Valley district.

== Notable person ==
- Arthur Bowring, rancher and legislator
