= Deloit, Iowa =

- City
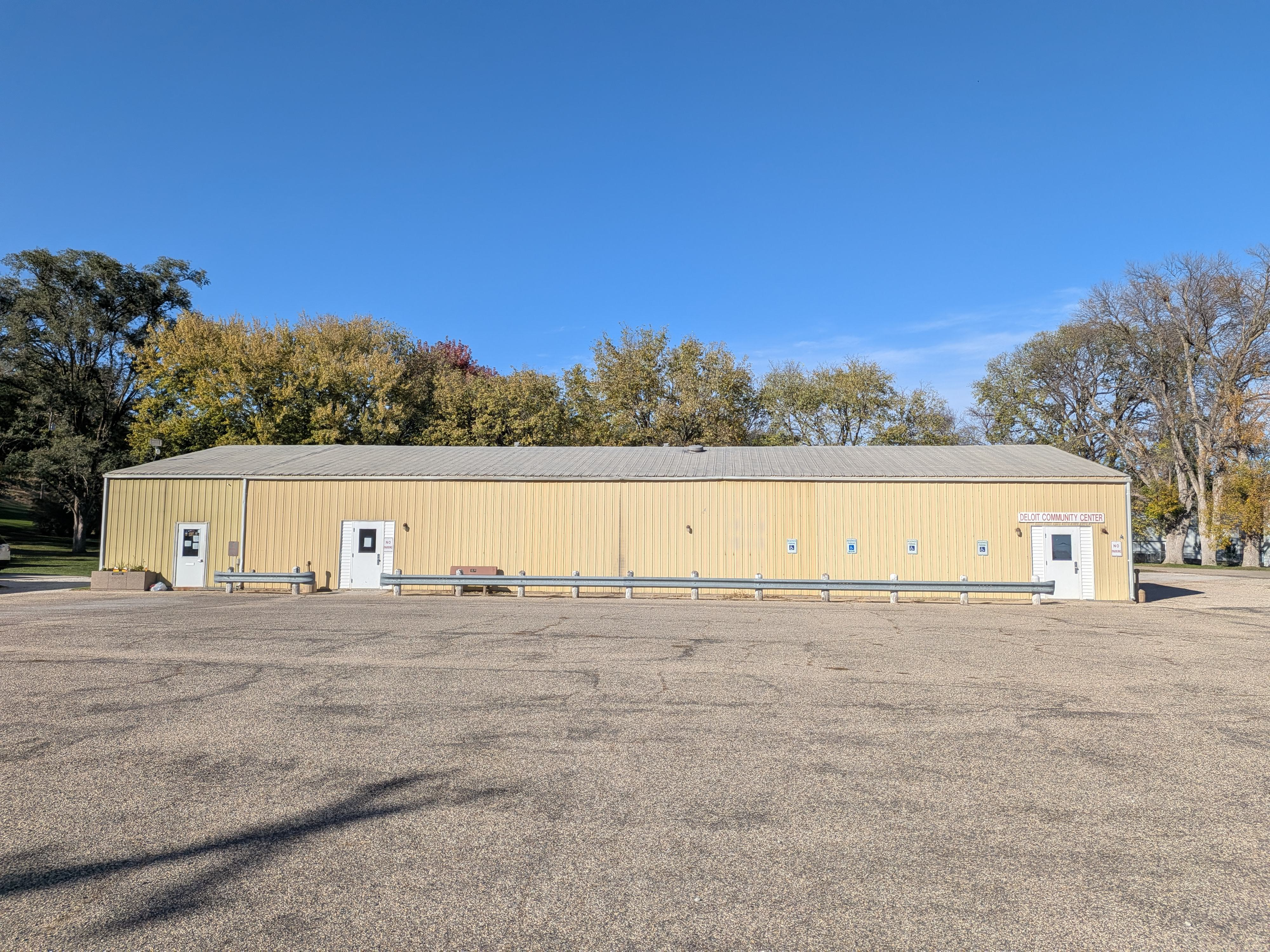
- Deloit Community Center

- Location of Deloit, Iowa
- Coordinates: 42°05′50″N 95°19′02″W
- Country: United States
- State: Iowa
- County: Crawford

Area
  - Total: 0.41 sq mi (1.05 km^{2})
  - Land: 0.41 sq mi (1.05 km^{2})
  - Water: 0 sq mi (0.00 km^{2})
- Elevation: 1,191 ft (363 m)

Population (2020)
  - Total: 250
  - Density: 614.2/sq mi (237.16/km^{2})
- Time zone: UTC-6 (Central (CST))
  - Summer (DST): UTC-5 (CDT)
- ZIP code: 51441
- Area code: 712
- FIPS code: 19-19765
- GNIS feature ID: 2394506

Deloit is a city in Crawford County, Iowa, along the Boyer River. The population was 250 at the time of the 2020 census.

== History ==
Deloit was platted in 1899. It was named after Beloit, Wisconsin, but the name was later altered.

== Geography ==
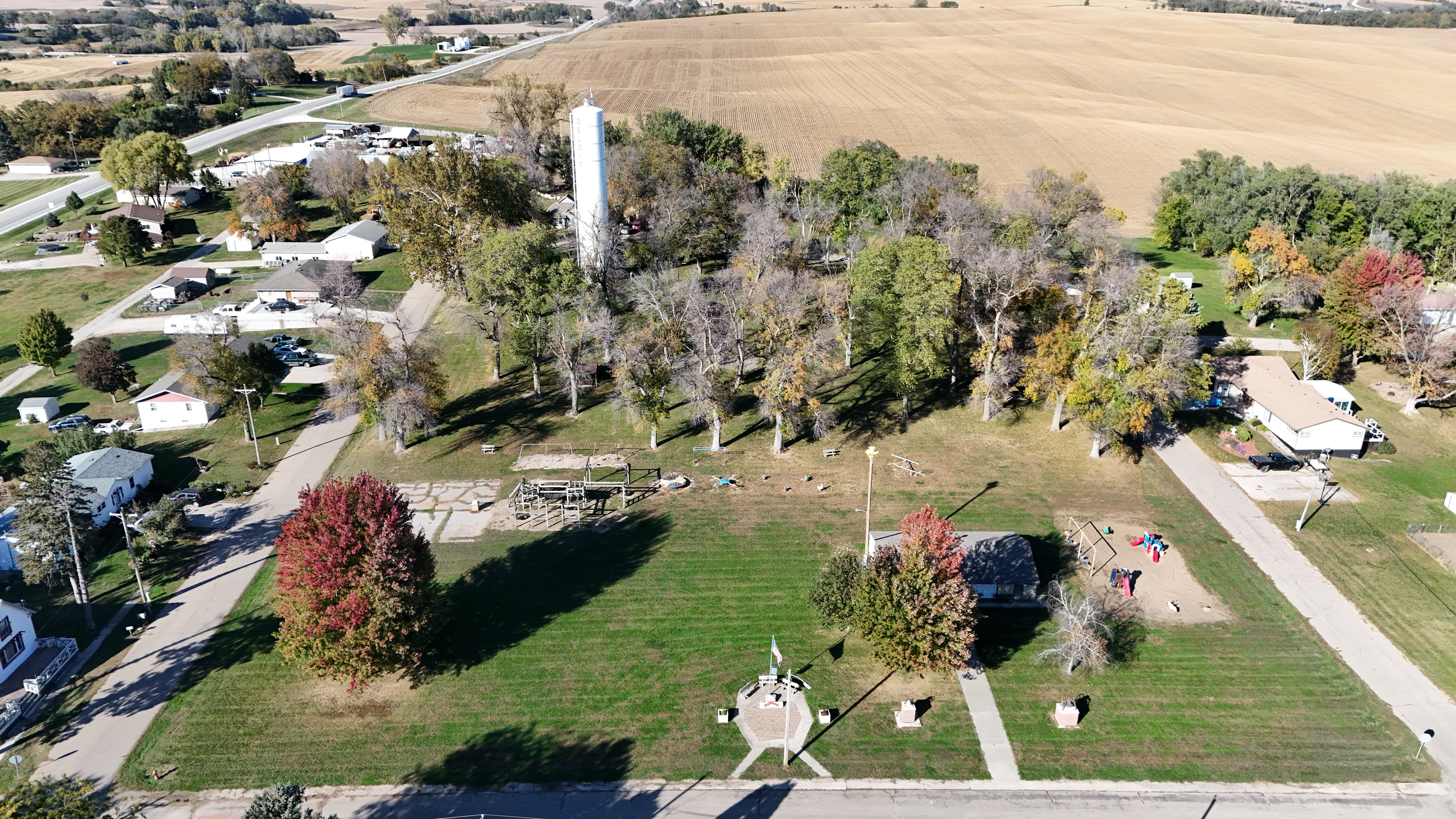
Deloit city park

According to the United States Census Bureau, the city has a total area of 0.42 square miles (1.09 km^{2}), all land.

== Demographics ==
Historical populations
Year	Pop.	±%
1870	103	—
1880	135	+31.1%
1890	154	+14.1%
1900	177	+14.9%
1910	208	+17.5%
1920	260	+25.0%
1930	280	+7.7%
1940	281	+0.4%
1950	235	−16.4%
1960	222	−5.5%
1970	279	+25.7%
1980	345	+23.7%
1990	296	−14.2%
2000	288	−2.7%
2010	264	−8.3%
2020	250	−5.3%
Source:"U.S. Census website". United States Census Bureau. and Iowa Data Center; Source: U.S. Decennial Census

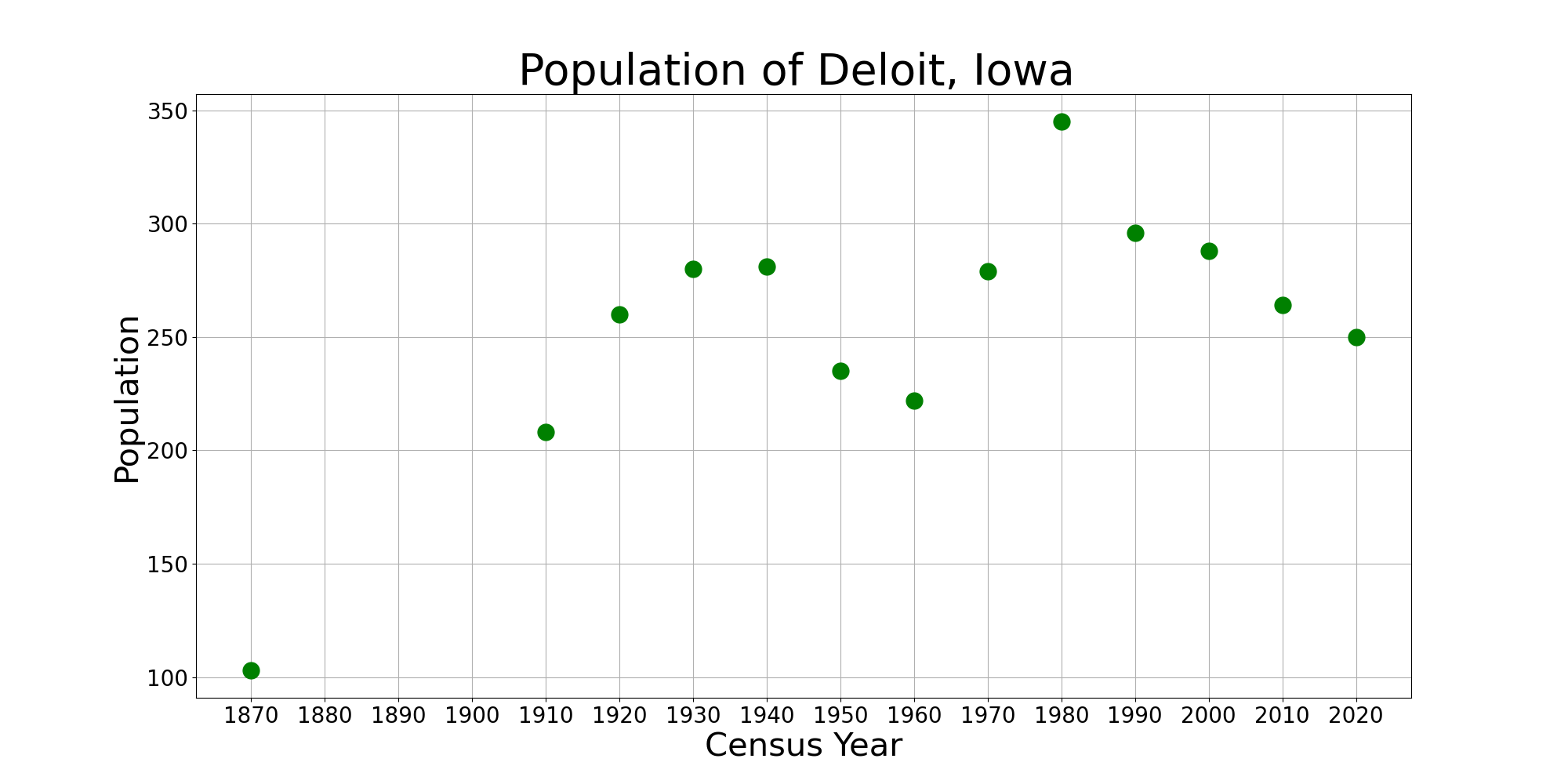
The population of Deloit, Iowa from US census data

=== 2020 census ===
As of the census of 2020, there were 250 people, 99 households, and 62 families residing in the city. The population density was 614.2 inhabitants per square mile (237.2/km^{2}). There were 120 housing units at an average density of 294.8 per square mile (113.8/km^{2}). The racial makeup of the city was 71.2% White, 0.4% Black or African American, 0.0% Native American, 0.4% Asian, 0.0% Pacific Islander, 16.8% from other races and 11.2% from two or more races. Hispanic or Latino persons of any race comprised 28.8% of the population.

Of the 99 households, 30.3% of which had children under the age of 18 living with them, 48.5% were married couples living together, 11.1% were cohabitating couples, 23.2% had a female householder with no spouse or partner present and 17.2% had a male householder with no spouse or partner present. 37.4% of all households were non-families. 24.2% of all households were made up of individuals, 12.1% had someone living alone who was 65 years old or older.

The median age in the city was 38.0 years. 30.0% of the residents were under the age of 20; 6.0% were between the ages of 20 and 24; 21.6% were from 25 and 44; 18.8% were from 45 and 64; and 23.6% were 65 years of age or older. The gender makeup of the city was 47.6% male and 52.4% female.

=== 2010 census ===
As of the census of 2010, there were 264 people, 109 households, and 71 families living in the city. The population density was 628.6 inhabitants per square mile (242.7/km^{2}). There were 123 housing units at an average density of 292.9 per square mile (113.1/km^{2}). The racial makeup of the city was 87.5% White, 11.0% from other races, and 1.5% from two or more races. Hispanic or Latino of any race were 22.0% of the population.

There were 109 households, of which 28.4% had children under the age of 18 living with them, 45.9% were married couples living together, 14.7% had a female householder with no husband present, 4.6% had a male householder with no wife present, and 34.9% were non-families. 26.6% of all households were made up of individuals, and 11% had someone living alone who was 65 years of age or older. The average household size was 2.42 and the average family size was 2.89.

The median age in the city was 36 years. 25.8% of residents were under the age of 18; 7.6% were between the ages of 18 and 24; 21.9% were from 25 to 44; 30.2% were from 45 to 64; and 14.4% were 65 years of age or older. The gender makeup of the city was 48.9% male and 51.1% female.

=== 2000 census ===
As of the census of 2000, there were 288 people, 114 households, and 76 families living in the city. The population density was 684.4 inhabitants per square mile (264.2/km^{2}). There were 123 housing units at an average density of 292.3 per square mile (112.9/km^{2}). The racial makeup of the city was 93.40% White, 0.69% Native American, 2.78% from other races, and 3.12% from two or more races. Hispanic or Latino of any race were 4.17% of the population.

There were 114 households, out of which 30.7% had children under the age of 18 living with them, 50.0% were married couples living together, 10.5% had a female householder with no husband present, and 33.3% were non-families. 24.6% of all households were made up of individuals, and 10.5% had someone living alone who was 65 years of age or older. The average household size was 2.53 and the average family size was 2.95.

In the city, the population was spread out, with 27.8% under the age of 18, 6.3% from 18 to 24, 25.0% from 25 to 44, 27.8% from 45 to 64, and 13.2% who were 65 years of age or older. The median age was 38 years. For every 100 females, there were 98.6 males. For every 100 females age 18 and over, there were 94.4 males.

The median income for a household in the city was $36,250, and the median income for a family was $40,568. Males had a median income of $26,875 versus $15,000 for females. The per capita income for the city was $14,446. About 3.4% of families and 6.0% of the population were below the poverty line, including 2.5% of those under the age of eighteen and 5.7% of those 65 or over.

== Education ==
The Denison Community School District operates public schools in the area.
