= Schleswig, Iowa =

- City
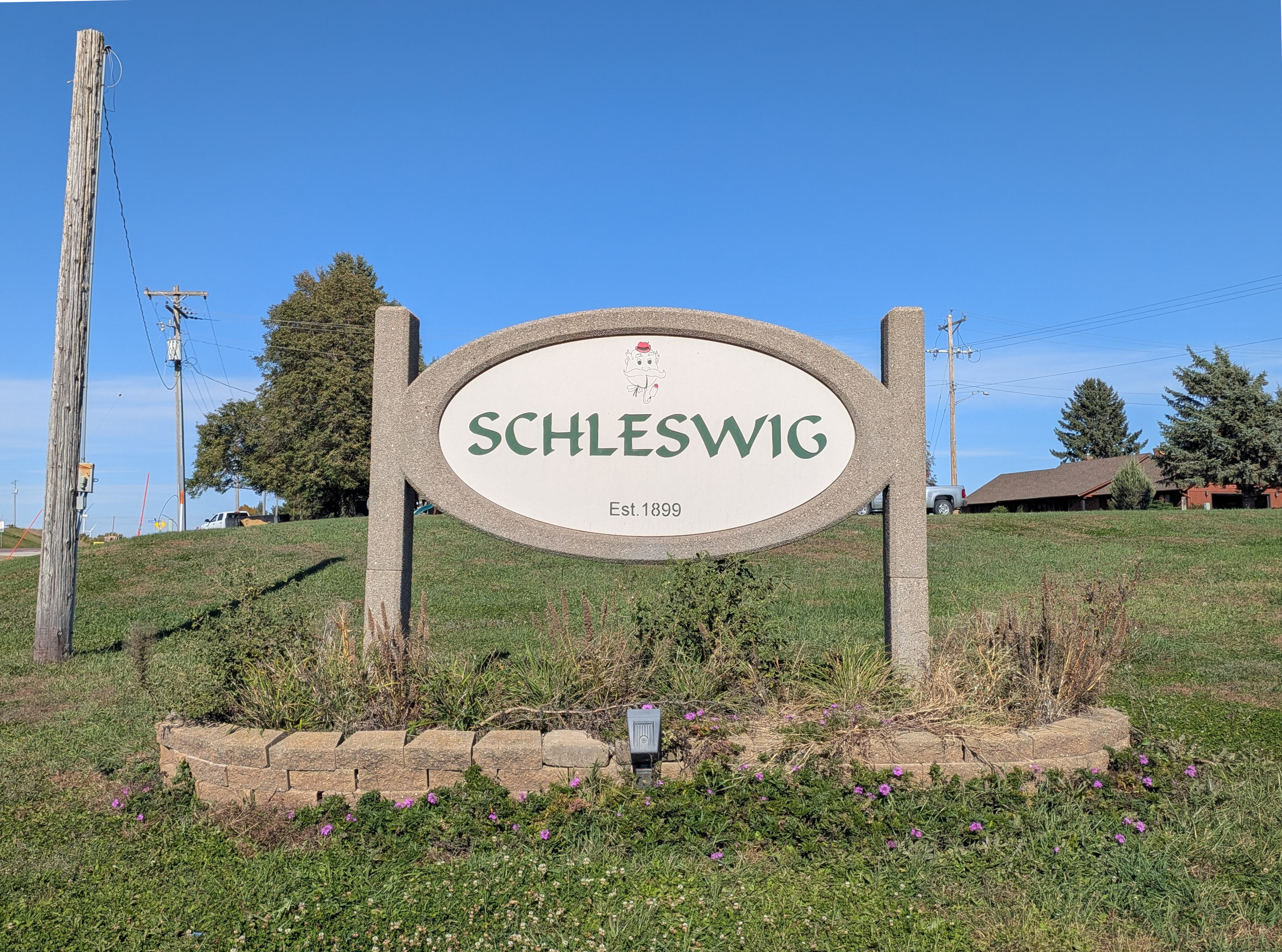

- Location of Schleswig, Iowa
- Coordinates: 42°09′40″N 95°26′07″W
- Country: US
- State: Iowa
- County: Crawford

Area
  - Total: 1.25 sq mi (3.24 km^{2})
  - Land: 1.24 sq mi (3.21 km^{2})
  - Water: 0.012 sq mi (0.03 km^{2})
- Elevation: 1,473 ft (449 m)

Population (2020)
  - Total: 830
  - Density: 669.7/sq mi (258.56/km^{2})
- Time zone: UTC-6 (Central (CST))
  - Summer (DST): UTC-5 (CDT)
- ZIP code: 51461
- Area code: 712
- FIPS code: 19-71130
- GNIS feature ID: 2396554
- Website: www.schleswigia.com

Schleswig is a city in Crawford County, Iowa, United States. The population was 830 at the time of the 2020 census.

== History ==
Schleswig was laid out in 1899. The city was named after the Schleswig in Germany and Denmark, from which the original settlers came.

== Geography ==
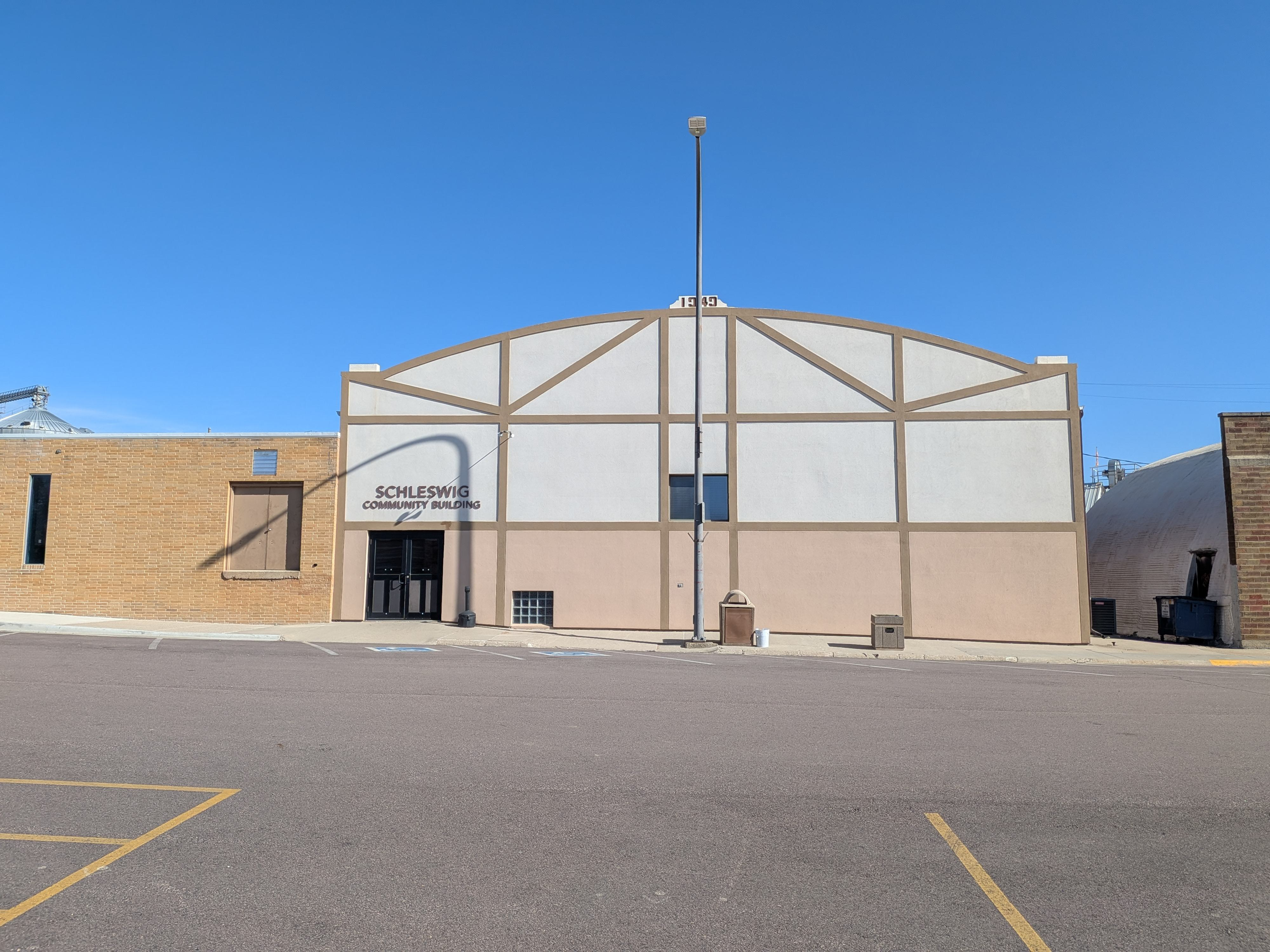
Schleswig Community Building

According to the United States Census Bureau, the city has a total area of 1.31 square miles (3.39 km^{2}), of which 1.30 square miles (3.37 km^{2}) is land and 0.01 square miles (0.03 km^{2}) is water.

== Demographics ==
Historical populations
Year	Pop.	±%
1900	233	—
1910	455	+95.3%
1920	655	+44.0%
1930	638	−2.6%
1940	628	−1.6%
1950	751	+19.6%
1960	785	+4.5%
1970	875	+11.5%
1980	868	−0.8%
1990	851	−2.0%
2000	833	−2.1%
2010	882	+5.9%
2020	830	−5.9%
Source:"U.S. Census website". United States Census Bureau. and Iowa Data Center; Source: U.S. Decennial Census

=== 2020 census ===
As of the census of 2020, there were 830 people, 363 households, and 239 families residing in the city. The population density was 669.7 inhabitants per square mile (258.6/km^{2}). There were 411 housing units at an average density of 331.6 per square mile (128.0/km^{2}). The racial makeup of the city was 84.7% White, 0.2% Black or African American, 0.6% Native American, 1.0% Asian, 0.1% Pacific Islander, 7.0% from other races and 6.4% from two or more races. Hispanic or Latino persons of any race comprised 12.8% of the population.

Of the 363 households, 27.0% of which had children under the age of 18 living with them, 50.7% were married couples living together, 6.1% were cohabitating couples, 23.1% had a female householder with no spouse or partner present and 20.1% had a male householder with no spouse or partner present. 34.2% of all households were non-families. 30.3% of all households were made up of individuals, 14.9% had someone living alone who was 65 years old or older.

The median age in the city was 45.3 years. 23.6% of the residents were under the age of 20; 6.5% were between the ages of 20 and 24; 19.5% were from 25 and 44; 27.0% were from 45 and 64; and 23.4% were 65 years of age or older. The gender makeup of the city was 50.7% male and 49.3% female.

=== 2010 census ===
As of the census of 2010, there were 882 people, 377 households, and 246 families living in the city. The population density was 678.5 inhabitants per square mile (262.0/km^{2}). There were 419 housing units at an average density of 322.3 per square mile (124.4/km^{2}). The racial makeup of the city was 92.9% White, 0.6% African American, 0.1% Asian, 0.1% Pacific Islander, 4.4% from other races, and 1.9% from two or more races. Hispanic or Latino of any race were 6.9% of the population.

There were 377 households, of which 28.9% had children under the age of 18 living with them, 53.6% were married couples living together, 7.2% had a female householder with no husband present, 4.5% had a male householder with no wife present, and 34.7% were non-families. 29.4% of all households were made up of individuals, and 15.4% had someone living alone who was 65 years of age or older. The average household size was 2.34 and the average family size was 2.89.

The median age in the city was 43.8 years. 25.3% of residents were under the age of 18; 5.4% were between the ages of 18 and 24; 20.4% were from 25 to 44; 27.9% were from 45 to 64; and 21% were 65 years of age or older. The gender makeup of the city was 48.0% male and 52.0% female.

=== 2000 census ===
As of the census of 2000, there were 833 people, 368 households, and 248 families living in the city. The population density was 633.5 inhabitants per square mile (244.6/km^{2}). There were 411 housing units at an average density of 312.6 per square mile (120.7/km^{2}). The racial makeup of the city was 99.76% White, 0.12% Asian, and 0.12% from two or more races. Hispanic or Latino of any race were 1.08% of the population.

There were 368 households, out of which 25.0% had children under the age of 18 living with them, 58.7% were married couples living together, 6.0% had a female householder with no husband present, and 32.6% were non-families. 31.5% of all households were made up of individuals, and 22.0% had someone living alone who was 65 years of age or older. The average household size was 2.26 and the average family size was 2.79.

In the city, the population was spread out, with 23.6% under the age of 18, 3.7% from 18 to 24, 23.0% from 25 to 44, 21.4% from 45 to 64, and 28.2% who were 65 years of age or older. The median age was 45 years. For every 100 females, there were 96.9 males. For every 100 females age 18 and over, there were 88.7 males.

The median income for a household in the city was $31,328, and the median income for a family was $39,000. Males had a median income of $30,429 versus $17,438 for females. The per capita income for the city was $15,805. About 3.3% of families and 4.2% of the population were below the poverty line, including none of those under age 18 and 3.5% of those age 65 or over.
