= List of townships in Iowa by county =

This is a list of townships in Iowa by county based on United States Geological Survey and U.S. Census data.

See: List of Iowa townships, List of counties in Iowa, List of cities in Iowa.

== Adair County ==
- Eureka
- Grand River
- Greenfield
- Grove
- Harrison
- Jackson
- Jefferson
- Lee
- Lincoln
- Orient
- Prussia
- Richland
- Summerset
- Summit
- Union
- Walnut
- Washington

== Adams County ==
- Carl
- Colony
- Douglas
- Grant
- Jasper
- Lincoln
- Mercer
- Nodaway
- Prescott
- Quincy
- Union
- Washington

== Allamakee County ==
- Center
- Fairview
- Franklin
- French Creek
- Hanover
- Iowa
- Jefferson
- Lafayette
- Lansing
- Linton
- Ludlow
- Makee
- Paint Creek
- Post
- Taylor
- Union City
- Union Prairie
- Waterloo

== Appanoose County ==
- Bellair
- Caldwell
- Chariton
- Douglas
- Franklin
- Independence
- Johns
- Lincoln
- Pleasant
- Sharon
- Taylor
- Udell
- Union
- Vermillion
- Walnut
- Washington
- Wells

== Audubon County ==
- Audubon
- Cameron
- Douglas
- Exira
- Greeley
- Hamlin
- Leroy
- Lincoln
- Melville
- Oakfield
- Sharon
- Viola

== Benton County ==
- Benton
- Big Grove
- Bruce
- Canton
- Cedar
- Eden
- Eldorado
- Florence
- Fremont
- Harrison
- Homer
- Iowa
- Jackson
- Kane
- Leroy
- Monroe
- Polk
- St. Clair
- Taylor
- Union

== Black Hawk County ==
- Barclay
- Bennington
- Big Creek
- Black Hawk
- Cedar
- Cedar Falls
- Eagle
- East Waterloo
- Fox
- Lester
- Lincoln
- Mount Vernon
- Orange
- Poyner
- Spring Creek
- Union
- Washington

== Boone County ==
- Amaqua
- Beaver
- Cass
- Colfax
- Des Moines
- Dodge
- Douglas
- Garden
- Grant
- Harrison
- Jackson
- Marcy
- Peoples
- Pilot Mound
- Union
- Worth
- Yell

== Bremer County ==
- Dayton
- Douglas
- Franklin
- Frederika
- Fremont
- Jackson
- Jefferson
- Lafayette
- Le Roy
- Maxfield
- Polk
- Sumner No. 2
- Warren
- Washington

== Buchanan County ==
- Buffalo
- Byron
- Cono
- Fairbank
- Fremont
- Hazleton
- Homer
- Jefferson
- Liberty
- Madison
- Middlefield
- Newton
- Perry
- Sumner
- Washington
- Westburg

== Buena Vista County ==
- Barnes
- Brooke
- Coon
- Elk
- Fairfield
- Grant
- Hayes
- Lee
- Lincoln
- Maple Valley
- Newell
- Nokomis
- Poland
- Providence
- Scott
- Washington

== Butler County ==
- Albion
- Beaver
- Bennezette
- Butler
- Coldwater
- Dayton
- Fremont
- Jackson
- Jefferson
- Madison
- Monroe
- Pittsford
- Ripley
- Shell Rock
- Washington
- West Point

== Calhoun County ==
- Butler
- Calhoun
- Cedar
- Center
- Elm Grove
- Garfield
- Greenfield
- Jackson
- Lake City
- Lake Creek
- Lincoln
- Logan
- Reading
- Sherman
- Twin Lakes
- Union
- Williams

== Carroll County ==
- Arcadia
- Eden
- Ewoldt
- Glidden
- Grant
- Jasper
- Kniest
- Maple River
- Newton
- Pleasant Valley
- Richland
- Roselle
- Sheridan
- Union
- Washington
- Wheatland

== Cass County ==
- Bear Grove
- Benton
- Brighton
- Cass
- Edna
- Franklin
- Grant
- Grove
- Lincoln
- Massena
- Noble
- Pleasant
- Pymosa
- Union
- Victoria
- Washington

== Cedar County ==
- Cass
- Center
- Dayton
- Fairfield
- Farmington
- Fremont
- Gower
- Inland
- Iowa
- Linn
- Massillon
- Pioneer
- Red Oak
- Rochester
- Springdale
- Springfield
- Sugar Creek

== Cerro Gordo County ==
- Bath
- Clear Lake
- Dougherty
- Falls
- Geneseo
- Grant
- Grimes
- Lake
- Lime Creek
- Lincoln
- Mason
- Mount Vernon
- Owen
- Pleasant Valley
- Portland
- Union

== Cherokee County ==
- Afton
- Amherst
- Cedar
- Cherokee
- Diamond
- Grand Meadow
- Liberty
- Marcus
- Pilot
- Pitcher
- Rock
- Sheridan
- Silver
- Spring
- Tilden
- Willow

== Chickasaw County ==
- Bradford
- Chickasaw
- Dayton
- Deerfield
- Dresden
- Fredericksburg
- Jacksonville
- New Hampton
- Richland
- Stapleton
- Utica
- Washington

== Clarke County ==
- Doyle
- Franklin
- Fremont
- Green Bay
- Jackson
- Knox
- Liberty
- Madison
- Osceola
- Troy
- Ward
- Washington

== Clay County ==
- Clay
- Douglas
- Freeman
- Garfield
- Gillett Grove
- Herdland
- Lake
- Lincoln
- Logan
- Lone Tree
- Meadow
- Peterson
- Riverton
- Sioux
- Summit
- Waterford

== Clayton County ==
- Boardman
- Buena Vista
- Cass
- Clayton
- Cox Creek
- Elk
- Farmersburg
- Garnavillo
- Giard
- Grand Meadow
- Highland
- Jefferson
- Lodomillo
- Mallory
- Marion
- Mendon
- Millville
- Monona
- Read
- Sperry
- Volga
- Wagner

== Clinton County ==
- Bloomfield
- Brookfield
- Camanche
- Center
- De Witt
- Deep Creek
- Eden
- Elk River
- Grant
- Hampshire
- Liberty
- Olive
- Orange
- Sharon
- Spring Rock
- Washington
- Waterford
- Welton

== Crawford County ==
- Boyer
- Charter Oak
- Denison
- East Boyer
- Goodrich
- Hanover
- Hayes
- Iowa
- Jackson
- Milford
- Morgan
- Nishnabotny
- Otter Creek
- Paradise
- Soldier
- Stockholm
- Union
- Washington
- West Side
- Willow

== Dallas County ==
- Adams
- Adel
- Beaver
- Boone
- Colfax
- Dallas
- Des Moines
- Grant
- Lincoln
- Linn
- Spring Valley
- Sugar Grove
- Union
- Van Meter
- Walnut
- Washington

== Davis County ==
- Cleveland
- Drakesville
- Fabius
- Fox River
- Grove
- Lick Creek
- Marion
- Perry
- Prairie
- Roscoe
- Salt Creek
- Soap Creek
- Union
- West Grove
- Wyacondah

== Decatur County ==
- Bloomington
- Burrell
- Center
- Decatur
- Eden
- Fayette
- Franklin
- Garden Grove
- Grand River
- Hamilton
- High Point
- Long Creek
- Morgan
- New Buda
- Richland
- Woodland

== Delaware County ==
- Adams
- Bremen
- Coffins Grove
- Colony
- Delaware
- Delhi
- Elk
- Hazel Green
- Honey Creek
- Milo
- North Fork
- Oneida
- Prairie
- Richland
- South Fork
- Union

== Des Moines County ==
- Benton
- Concordia
- Danville
- Flint River
- Franklin
- Huron
- Jackson
- Pleasant Grove
- Tama
- Union
- Washington
- Yellow Springs

== Dickinson County ==
- Center Grove
- Diamond Lake
- Excelsior
- Lakeville
- Lloyd
- Milford
- Okoboji
- Richland
- Silver Lake
- Spirit Lake
- Superior
- Westport

== Dubuque County ==
- Cascade
- Center
- Concord
- Dodge
- Dubuque
- Iowa
- Jefferson
- Julien
- Liberty
- Mosalem
- New Wine
- Peru
- Prairie Creek
- Table Mound
- Taylor
- Vernon
- Washington
- Whitewater

== Emmet County ==
- Armstrong Grove
- Center
- Denmark
- Ellsworth
- Emmet
- Estherville
- High Lake
- Iowa Lake
- Jack Creek
- Lincoln
- Swan Lake
- Twelve Mile Lake

== Fayette County ==
- Auburn
- Banks
- Bethel
- Center
- Clermont
- Dover
- Eden
- Fairfield
- Fremont
- Harlan
- Illyria
- Jefferson
- Oran
- Pleasant Valley
- Putnam
- Scott
- Smithfield
- Union
- Westfield
- Windsor

== Floyd County ==
- Cedar
- Floyd
- Niles
- Pleasant Grove
- Riverton
- Rock Grove
- Rockford
- Rudd
- Saint Charles
- Scott
- Ulster
- Union

== Franklin County ==
- Geneva
- Grant
- Hamilton
- Ingham
- Lee
- Marion
- Morgan
- Mott
- Oakland
- Osceola
- Reeve
- Richland
- Ross
- Scott
- West Fork
- Wisner

== Fremont County ==
- Benton
- Fisher
- Green
- Locust Grove
- Madison
- Monroe
- Prairie
- Riverside
- Riverton
- Scott
- Sidney
- Walnut
- Washington

== Greene County ==
- Bristol
- Cedar
- Dawson
- Franklin
- Grant
- Greenbrier
- Hardin
- Highland
- Jackson
- Junction
- Kendrick
- Paton
- Scranton
- Washington
- Willow

== Grundy County ==
- Beaver
- Black Hawk
- Clay
- Colfax
- Fairfield
- Felix
- German
- Grant
- Lincoln
- Melrose
- Palermo
- Pleasant Valley
- Shiloh
- Washington

== Guthrie County ==
- Baker
- Bear Grove
- Beaver
- Cass
- Dodge
- Grant
- Highland
- Jackson
- Orange
- Penn
- Richland
- Seely
- Stuart
- Thompson
- Union
- Valley
- Victory

== Hamilton County ==
- Blairsburg
- Cass
- Clear Lake
- Ellsworth
- Freedom
- Fremont
- Hamilton
- Independence
- Liberty
- Lincoln
- Lyon
- Marion
- Rose Grove
- Scott
- Webster
- Webster City
- Williams

== Hancock County ==
- Amsterdam
- Avery
- Bingham
- Boone
- Britt
- Concord
- Crystal
- Ell
- Ellington
- Erin
- Garfield
- Liberty
- Madison
- Magor
- Orthel
- Twin Lake

== Hardin County ==
- Alden
- Buckeye
- Clay
- Concord
- Eldora
- Ellis
- Etna
- Grant
- Hardin
- Jackson
- Pleasant
- Providence
- Sherman
- Tipton
- Union

== Harrison County ==
- Allen
- Boyer
- Calhoun
- Cass
- Cincinnati
- Clay
- Douglas
- Harrison
- Jackson
- Jefferson
- La Grange
- Lincoln
- Little Sioux
- Magnolia
- Morgan
- Raglan
- St. Johns
- Taylor
- Union
- Washington

== Henry County ==
- Baltimore
- Canaan
- Center
- Jackson
- Jefferson
- Marion
- New London
- Salem
- Scott
- Tippecanoe
- Trenton
- Wayne

== Howard County ==
- Afton
- Albion
- Chester
- Forest City
- Howard
- Howard Center
- Jamestown
- New Oregon
- Oak Dale
- Paris
- Saratoga
- Vernon Springs

== Humboldt County ==
- Avery
- Beaver
- Corinth
- Dakota City
- Delana
- Grove
- Humboldt
- Lake
- Norway
- Rutland
- Vernon
- Wacousta
- Weaver

== Ida County ==
- Battle
- Blaine
- Corwin
- Douglas
- Galva
- Garfield
- Grant
- Griggs
- Hayes
- Logan
- Maple
- Silver Creek

== Iowa County ==
- Dayton
- English
- Fillmore
- Greene
- Hartford
- Hilton
- Honey Creek
- Iowa
- Lenox
- Lincoln
- Marengo
- Pilot
- Sumner
- Troy
- Washington
- York

== Jackson County ==
- Bellevue
- Brandon
- Butler
- Fairfield
- Farmers Creek
- Iowa
- Jackson
- Maquoketa
- Monmouth
- Otter Creek
- Perry
- Prairie Springs
- Richland
- South Fork
- Tete Des Morts
- Union
- Van Buren
- Washington

== Jasper County ==
- Buena Vista
- Clear Creek
- Des Moines
- Elk Creek
- Fairview
- Hickory Grove
- Independence
- Kellogg
- Lynn Grove
- Malaka
- Mariposa
- Mound Prairie
- Newton
- Palo Alto
- Poweshiek
- Richland
- Rock Creek
- Sherman
- Washington

== Jefferson County ==
- Black Hawk
- Buchanan
- Cedar
- Center
- Des Moines
- Liberty
- Lockridge
- Locust Grove
- Penn
- Polk
- Round Prairie
- Walnut

== Johnson County ==
- Big Grove
- Cedar
- Clear Creek
- East Lucas
- Fremont
- Graham
- Hardin
- Iowa City
- Jefferson
- Liberty
- Lincoln
- Madison
- Monroe
- Newport
- Oxford
- Penn
- Pleasant Valley
- Scott
- Sharon
- Union
- Washington
- West Lucas

== Jones County ==
- Cass
- Castle Grove
- Clay
- Fairview
- Greenfield
- Hale
- Jackson
- Lovell
- Madison
- Oxford
- Richland
- Rome
- Scotch Grove
- Washington
- Wayne
- Wyoming

== Keokuk County ==
- Adams
- Benton
- Clear Creek
- East Lancaster
- English River
- Jackson
- Lafayette
- Liberty
- Plank
- Prairie
- Richland
- Sigourney
- Steady Run
- Van Buren
- Warren
- Washington
- West Lancaster

== Kossuth County ==
- Buffalo
- Burt
- Cresco
- Eagle
- Fenton
- Garfield
- German
- Grant
- Greenwood
- Harrison
- Hebron
- Irvington
- Ledyard
- Lincoln
- Lotts Creek
- Lu Verne
- Plum Creek
- Portland
- Prairie
- Ramsey
- Riverdale
- Seneca
- Sherman
- Springfield
- Swea
- Union
- Wesley
- Whittemore

== Lee County ==
- Cedar
- Charleston
- Denmark
- Des Moines
- Franklin
- Green Bay
- Harrison
- Jackson
- Jefferson
- Madison
- Marion
- Montrose
- Pleasant Ridge
- Van Buren
- Washington
- West Point

== Linn County ==
- Bertram
- Boulder
- Brown
- Buffalo
- Clinton
- College
- Fairfax
- Fayette
- Franklin
- Grant
- Jackson
- Linn
- Maine
- Marion
- Monroe
- Otter Creek
- Putnam
- Spring Grove
- Washington

== Louisa County ==
- Columbus City
- Concord
- Eliot
- Elm Grove
- Grandview
- Jefferson
- Marshall
- Morning Sun
- Oakland
- Port Louisa
- Union
- Wapello

== Lucas County ==
- Benton
- Cedar
- English
- Jackson
- Liberty
- Lincoln
- Otter Creek
- Pleasant
- Union
- Warren
- Washington
- Whitebreast

== Lyon County ==
- Allison
- Centennial
- Cleveland
- Dale
- Doon
- Elgin
- Garfield
- Grant
- Larchwood
- Liberal
- Logan
- Lyon
- Midland
- Richland
- Riverside
- Rock
- Sioux
- Wheeler

== Madison County ==
- Crawford
- Douglas
- Grand River
- Jackson
- Jefferson
- Lee
- Lincoln
- Madison
- Monroe
- Ohio
- Penn
- Scott
- South
- Union
- Walnut
- Webster

== Mahaska County ==
- Adams
- Black Oak
- Cedar
- East Des Moines
- Garfield
- Harrison
- Jefferson
- Lincoln
- Madison
- Monroe
- Pleasant Grove
- Prairie
- Richland
- Scott
- Spring Creek
- Union
- West Des Moines
- White Oak

== Marion County ==
- Clay
- Dallas
- Franklin
- Indiana
- Knoxville
- Lake Prairie
- Liberty
- Pleasant Grove
- Red Rock
- Summit
- Union
- Washington

== Marshall County ==
- Bangor
- Eden
- Greencastle
- Jefferson
- Le Grand
- Liberty
- Liscomb
- Logan
- Marietta
- Marion
- Minerva
- State Center
- Taylor
- Timber Creek
- Vienna
- Washington

== Mills County ==
- Anderson
- Center
- Deer Creek
- Glenwood
- Indian Creek
- Ingraham
- Lyons
- Oak
- Plattville
- Rawles
- St. Marys
- Silver Creek
- White Cloud

== Mitchell County ==
- Burr Oak
- Cedar
- Douglas
- East Lincoln
- Jenkins
- Liberty
- Mitchell
- Newburg
- Osage
- Otranto
- Rock
- St. Ansgar
- Stacyville
- Union
- Wayne
- West Lincoln

== Monona County ==
- Ashton
- Belvidere
- Center
- Cooper
- Fairview
- Franklin
- Grant
- Jordan
- Kennebec
- Lake
- Lincoln
- Maple
- St. Clair
- Sherman
- Sioux
- Soldier
- Spring Valley
- West Fork
- Willow

== Monroe County ==
- Bluff Creek
- Cedar
- Franklin
- Guilford
- Jackson
- Mantua
- Monroe
- Pleasant
- Troy
- Union
- Urbana
- Wayne

== Montgomery County ==
- Douglas
- East
- Frankfort
- Garfield
- Grant
- Lincoln
- Pilot Grove
- Red Oak
- Scott
- Sherman
- Washington
- West

== Muscatine County ==
- Bloomington
- Cedar
- Fruitland
- Fulton
- Goshen
- Lake
- Montpelier
- Moscow
- Orono
- Pike
- Seventy-Six
- Sweetland
- Wapsinonoc
- Wilton

== O'Brien County ==
- Baker
- Caledonia
- Carroll
- Center
- Dale
- Floyd
- Franklin
- Grant
- Hartley
- Highland
- Liberty
- Lincoln
- Omega
- Summit
- Union
- Waterman

== Osceola County ==
- Allison
- Baker
- East Holman
- Fairview
- Gilman
- Goewey
- Harrison
- Horton
- Ocheyedan
- Viola
- West Holman
- Wilson

== Page County ==
- Amity
- Buchanan
- Colfax
- Douglas
- East River
- Fremont
- Grant
- Harlan
- Lincoln
- Morton
- Nebraska
- Nodaway
- Pierce
- Tarkio
- Valley
- Washington

== Palo Alto County ==
- Booth
- Ellington
- Emmetsburg
- Fairfield
- Fern Valley
- Freedom
- Great Oak
- Highland
- Independence
- Lost Island
- Nevada
- Rush Lake
- Silver Lake
- Vernon
- Walnut
- West Bend

== Plymouth County ==
- America
- Elgin
- Elkhorn
- Fredonia
- Garfield
- Grant
- Hancock
- Henry
- Hungerford
- Johnson
- Liberty
- Lincoln
- Marion
- Meadow
- Perry
- Plymouth
- Portland
- Preston
- Remsen
- Sioux
- Stanton
- Union
- Washington
- Westfield

== Pocahontas County ==
- Bellville
- Cedar
- Center
- Colfax
- Cummins
- Des Moines
- Dover
- Garfield
- Grant
- Lake
- Lincoln
- Lizard
- Marshall
- Powhatan
- Roosevelt
- Sherman
- Swan Lake

== Polk County ==
- Allen
- Beaver
- Bloomfield
- Camp
- Clay
- Crocker
- Delaware
- Des Moines
- Douglas
- Elkhart
- Four Mile
- Franklin
- Jefferson
- Lee
- Lincoln
- Madison
- Saylor
- Union
- Walnut
- Washington
- Webster

== Pottawattamie County ==
- Belknap
- Boomer
- Carson
- Center
- Crescent
- Garner
- Grove
- Hardin
- Hazel Dell
- James
- Kane
- Keg Creek
- Knox
- Lake
- Layton
- Lewis
- Lincoln
- Macedonia
- Minden
- Neola
- Norwalk
- Pleasant
- Rockford
- Silver Creek
- Valley
- Washington
- Waveland
- Wright
- York

== Poweshiek County ==
- Bear Creek
- Chester
- Deep River
- Grant
- Jackson
- Jefferson
- Lincoln
- Madison
- Malcom
- Pleasant
- Scott
- Sheridan
- Sugar Creek
- Union
- Warren
- Washington

== Ringgold County ==
- Athens
- Benton
- Clinton
- Grant
- Jefferson
- Liberty
- Lincoln
- Lotts Creek
- Middle Fork
- Monroe
- Poe
- Rice
- Riley
- Tingley
- Union
- Washington
- Waubonsie

== Sac County ==
- Boyer Valley
- Cedar
- Clinton
- Cook
- Coon Valley
- Delaware
- Douglas
- Eden
- Eureka
- Jackson
- Levey
- Richland
- Sac
- Viola
- Wall Lake
- Wheeler

== Scott County ==
- Allens Grove
- Blue Grass
- Buffalo
- Butler
- Cleona
- Hickory Grove
- Le Claire
- Liberty
- Lincoln
- Pleasant Valley
- Princeton
- Sheridan
- Winfield

== Shelby County ==
- Cass
- Center
- Clay
- Douglas
- Fairview
- Greeley
- Grove
- Jackson
- Jefferson
- Lincoln
- Monroe
- Polk
- Shelby
- Union
- Washington
- Westphalia

== Sioux County ==
- Buncombe
- Capel
- Center
- Eagle
- East Orange
- Floyd
- Garfield
- Grant
- Holland
- Lincoln
- Logan
- Lynn
- Nassau
- Plato
- Reading
- Rock
- Settlers
- Sheridan
- Sherman
- Sioux
- Washington
- Welcome
- West Branch

== Story County ==
- Collins
- Franklin
- Grant
- Howard
- Indian Creek
- Lafayette
- Lincoln
- Milford
- Nevada
- New Albany
- Palestine
- Richland
- Sherman
- Union
- Warren
- Washington

== Tama County ==
- Buckingham
- Carlton
- Carroll
- Clark
- Columbia
- Crystal
- Geneseo
- Grant
- Highland
- Howard
- Indian Village
- Lincoln
- Oneida
- Otter Creek
- Perry
- Richland
- Salt Creek
- Spring Creek
- Tama
- Toledo
- York

== Taylor County ==
- Bedford
- Benton
- Clayton
- Dallas
- Gay
- Grant
- Grove
- Holt
- Jackson
- Jefferson
- Marshall
- Mason
- Nodaway
- Platte
- Polk
- Ross
- Washington

== Union County ==
- Dodge
- Douglas
- Grant
- Highland
- Jones
- Lincoln
- New Hope
- Platte
- Pleasant
- Sand Creek
- Spaulding
- Union

== Van Buren County ==
- Bonaparte
- Cedar
- Chequest
- Des Moines
- Farmington
- Harrisburg
- Henry
- Jackson
- Lick Creek
- Union
- Van Buren
- Vernon
- Village
- Washington

== Wapello County ==
- Adams
- Agency
- Cass
- Center
- Columbia
- Competine
- Dahlonega
- Green
- Highland
- Keokuk
- Pleasant
- Polk
- Richland
- Washington

== Warren County ==
- Allen
- Belmont
- Greenfield
- Jackson
- Jefferson
- Liberty
- Lincoln
- Linn
- Otter
- Palmyra
- Richland
- Squaw
- Union
- Virginia
- White Breast
- White Oak

== Washington County ==
- Brighton
- Cedar
- Clay
- Crawford
- Dutch Creek
- English River
- Franklin
- Highland
- Iowa
- Jackson
- Lime Creek
- Marion
- Oregon
- Seventy-Six
- Washington

== Wayne County ==
- Benton
- Clay
- Clinton
- Corydon
- Grand River
- Howard
- Jackson
- Jefferson
- Monroe
- Richman
- South Fork
- Union
- Walnut
- Warren
- Washington
- Wright

== Webster County ==
- Badger
- Burnside
- Clay
- Colfax
- Cooper
- Dayton
- Deer Creek
- Douglas
- Elkhorn
- Fulton
- Gowrie
- Hardin
- Jackson
- Johnson
- Lost Grove
- Newark
- Otho
- Pleasant Valley
- Roland
- Sumner
- Washington
- Webster
- Yell

== Winnebago County ==
- Buffalo
- Center
- Eden
- Forest
- Grant
- King
- Lincoln
- Linden
- Logan
- Mount Valley
- Newton
- Norway

== Winneshiek County ==
- Bloomfield
- Bluffton
- Burr Oak
- Calmar
- Canoe
- Decorah
- Frankville
- Fremont
- Glenwood
- Hesper
- Highland
- Jackson
- Lincoln
- Madison
- Military
- Orleans
- Pleasant
- Springfield
- Sumner
- Washington

== Woodbury County ==
- Arlington
- Banner
- Concord
- Floyd
- Grange
- Grant
- Kedron
- Lakeport
- Liberty
- Liston
- Little Sioux
- Miller
- Morgan
- Moville
- Oto
- Rock
- Rutland
- Sioux City
- Sloan
- Union
- West Fork
- Willow
- Wolf Creek
- Woodbury

== Worth County ==
- Barton
- Bristol
- Brookfield
- Danville
- Deer Creek
- Fertile
- Grove
- Hartland
- Kensett
- Lincoln
- Silver Lake
- Union

== Wright County ==
- Belmond
- Blaine
- Boone
- Dayton
- Eagle Grove
- Grant
- Iowa
- Lake
- Liberty
- Lincoln
- Norway
- Pleasant
- Troy
- Vernon
- Wall Lake
- Woolstock
