= Iowa's 3rd Senate district =

American legislative district

Iowa's 3rd State Senate district
Senator
Lynn Evans; R

The 3rd district of the Iowa Senate, located in Northwestern Iowa, is currently composed of Buena Vista, Osceola, and O'Brien counties, and parts of Cherokee and Clay counties. Its current member of the Iowa Senate is Republican Lynn Evans.

== Current elected officials ==
Republican Lynn Evans has been the senator representing the 3rd District since 2023.

The area of the 3rd District contains two Iowa House of Representatives districts:

- The 5th District (represented by Zach Dieken)
- The 6th District (represented by Megan Jones)

The district is also located in Iowa's 4th congressional district, which is represented by U.S. Representative Randy Feenstra.

== List of representatives ==
Representative	Party	Dates	Residence	Notes
John Jackson Selman	Democratic	1846–1851	Bloomfield	
George Schramm	Whig	1852–1855	Farmington	
John Brice Spees	Whig	1852–1853	Birmingham	
Abner Harrison McCrary	Whig	1854–1857		
Gideon Smith Bailey	Democratic	1858–1859	Vernon	
Cyrus Bussey	Democratic	1860–1862	Bloomfield	Called to the Army in February, 1862
James Pollard	Democratic	1862–1863	Bloomfield	
Samuel Alphonso Moore	Republican	1864–1867		
Henry Clay Traverse	Republican	1868–1871	Bloomfield	
Horatio Wonn	Democratic	1872–1877		
Joshua Miller	Republican	1878–1879	Centerville	
Jesse J. Wall	Greenback	1880–1883	Centerville	
Edward Gault	Democratic	1884–1887	Cincinnati	
William Henry Taylor	Democratic	1888–1891	Bloomfield	
Ephraim Reynolds	Republican	1892–1895	Centerville	
Beryl F. Carroll	Republican	1896–1899	Bloomfield	
Claude R. Porter	Democratic	1900–1903	Centerville	
Lewis Leroy Taylor	Democratic	1904–1912	Centerville	
James M. Wilson	Republican	1913–1920	Centerville	
John Jesse Ethell	Republican	1921–1924	Bloomfield	
Lloyd Ellis	Democratic	1925–1928	Chariton	
Herbert B. Carroll	Republican	1929–1932		
John K. Valentine	Democrat	1933–1936	Centerville	Elected lieutenant governor in 1936
Hugh Guernsey	Democrat	1936–1940	Centerville	
Dewey Goode	Republican	1941–1944	Bloomfield	
James R. Barkley	Republican	1945–1948	Moulton	Died in office, July 8, 1948
David Sherman West	Democrat	1949–1952	Moulton	
Ted D. Clark	Republican	1953–1956	Mystic	
Gene Lyle Hoffman	Democrat	1957–1960	West Grove	
Joe N. Wilson	Republican	1961–1964	Unionville	
Donald S. McGill	Democrat	1965–1970	Melrose	
Wayne D. Keith	Republican	1971–1973	Oak Lake	
Warren E. Curtis	Republican	1972–1978	Cherokee County	
Arne Waldstein	Republican	1979–1982	Buena Vista County	
Douglas Ritsema	Republican	1983–1986	Sioux County	
Wilmer Rensink	Republican	1987–1998	Sioux Center	
Ken Veenstra	Republican	1999–2002	Sioux County	
David Johnson	Republican	2003–2012	Ocheyedan	
Bill Anderson	Republican	2013–2017	Pierson	Resigned from office in 2017
Jim Carlin	Republican	2017–2022	Sioux City	
Lynn Evans	Republican	2023–present	Cherokee County	

== Historical district boundaries ==
Map	Description	Years effective	Notes
	Appanoose County; Davis County	1846–1849	From 1846 to 1857, district numbering was not utilized by the Iowa State Legislature. This convention was added with the passing of the 1857 Iowa Constitution. Numbering of districts pre-1857 is done as a matter of historic convenience.
	Appanoose County; Davis County; Wayne County	1850–1851	
	Van Buren County	1852–1855	
	Van Buren County	1856–1859	District 3 included a portion of district 2 during this period.
	Davis County	1860–1877	
	Appanoose County	1878–1883	
	Appanoose County; Monroe County	1884–1887	
	Appanoose County; Davis County	1888–1962	
	Lucas County; Monroe County Wayne County	1963–1966	
	Appanoose County; Lucas County; Monroe County	1967–1970	
	Emmet County Humboldt County; Kossuth County	1971–1972	In 1970, the Iowa Legislature passed an amendment to the Iowa Constitution setting forth the rules for legislative redistricting in order to abide by the rules established by the Reynolds v. Sims Supreme Court case. The first reapportionment map created by the Republican controlled legislature was deemed unconstitutional, but was still used for the 1970 election.
	Buena Vista County (partial); Cherokee County (partial); Clay County (partial); Palo Alto County (partial); Plymouth County (partial); Pocahontas County (partial); O'Brien County (partial)	1973–1982	
	Plymouth County; Sioux County (partial); Woodbury County (partial)	1983–1992	
	Lyon County; O'Brien County (partial); Osceola County; Sioux County	1993–2002	
	Clay County; Dickinson County; O'Brien County; Osceola County; Sioux County (partial): Grant Township; Lynn Township; Floyd Township; East Orange Township	2003–2012	
	Plymouth County (partial): Excluding; Meadow Township; Remsen Township; Henry Township; Garfield Township; Including Kingsley, Iowa; Woodbury County (partial): Excluding; Rock Township; Morgan Township; Miller Township; Liston Township; Oto Township; Little Sioux Township; Willow Township; Sloan Township; Concord Township; Sioux City, Iowa approximately north of US20; Anthon, Iowa	2013–2022	
	Buena Vista County Cherokee County (partial): Liberty Township; Cedar Township; Cherokee Township; Pilot Township; Silver Township; Spring Township; Afton Township; Pitcher Township; Diamond Township; Clay County (partial): Lone Tree Township excluding Everly; Riverton Township; Clay Township; Lincoln Township; Gillett Grove Township; Logan Township; Peterson Township; Douglas Township; Herdland Township; Garfield Township; Spencer, Iowa; O'Brien County; Osceola County	2023–present	

== See also ==
- Iowa General Assembly
- Iowa Senate
