= Iowa's 9th Senate district =

American legislative district

Iowa's 9th State Senate district
Senator
Tom Shipley; R

The 9th District of the Iowa Senate is located in southwestern Iowa, and is currently composed of Adams, Cass, Montgomery, Page, Ringgold, Taylor, and part of Union counties.

== Current elected officials ==
Tom Shipley is the senator currently representing the 9th District.

The area of the 9th District contains two Iowa House of Representatives districts:

- The 17th District (represented by Devon Wood)
- The 18th District (represented by Tom Moore)

The district is also located in Iowa's 3rd congressional district, which is represented by U.S. Representative Zach Nunn.

== List of representatives ==
Representative	Party	Dates	Residence	Notes
Francis Springer	Whig	1846-1849	Columbus Junction, Iowa	
Norman Everson	Whig	1850-1851	Washington, Iowa	
Amos Harris	Democrat	1852-1853	Centerville, Iowa	
Nathan Udell	Democrat	1854-1855	Appanoose County	
Daniel Anderson	Republican	1856-1859	Albia, Iowa	
Alvin Saunders	Republican	1860-1861	Mount Pleasant, Iowa	Saunders was appointed to be the governor of the Nebraska Territory in 1861 by President Abraham Lincoln.
Leroy Palmer	Republican	1861	Mount Pleasant, Iowa	
Theron Woolson	Republican	1862-1863	Henry County	
John Foote	Republican	1864-1865	Burlington, Iowa	
Fitz Warren	Republican	1866-1867	Des Moines County	
Jefferson P. Casady	Democrat	1868-1871	Council Bluffs, Iowa	
John Stone	Republican	1872-1875	Glenwood, Iowa	
George Franklin Wright	Republican	1876-1877	Council Bluffs, Iowa	Not to be confused with George G. Wright, though George F. Wright did work for and with George G. Wright in Keosauqua, Iowa.
John Patterson	Republican	1878-1881	Des Moines County	
Benton Jay Hall	Democrat	1882-1884	Des Moines County	Hall was elected to the United States House of Representatives in 1884.
William Dodge	Democrat	1886-1893	Des Moines County	
Thomas Harper	Democrat	1894-1897	Burlington, Iowa	
William McArthur	Republican	1898-1901	Burlington, Iowa	
Frederick Smith	Democrat	1902-1910	Des Moines County	
LaMonte Cowles	Republican	1911-1914	Burlington, Iowa	
Frank Thompson	Republican	1915-1922	Burlington, Iowa	
Edward Romkey	Republican	1923-1926	Burlington, Iowa	
Clyde Topping	Republican	1927-1934	Burlington, Iowa	
James M. Bell	Democrat	1935-1938	Burlington, Iowa	
Frederick Cromwell	Republican	1939-1946	Burlington, Iowa	
William Skourup	Republican	1947-1950	Burlington, Iowa	
Thomas Dailey	Democrat	1951-1958	Burlington, Iowa	
Carl Hoschek	Democrat	1959-1962	Burlington, Iowa	
Jacob Mincks	Democrat	1963-1966	Wapello County	
Gene W. Glenn	Democrat	1967-1970	Ottumwa, Iowa	
Leigh Curran	Republican	1971-1972	Mason City, Iowa	
Dale Tieden	Republican	1973-1982	Elkader, Iowa	
Ray Taylor	Republican	1983-1994	Steamboat Rock, Iowa	
Stewart Iverson	Republican	1995-2002	Wright County	
Bob Brunkhorst	Republican	2003-2006	Waverly, Iowa	
William Heckroth	Democrat	2007-2010	Waverly, Iowa	
Bill Dix	Republican	2011-2012	Shell Rock, Iowa	
Nancy Boettger	Republican	2013-2014	Harlan, Iowa	
Jason Schultz	Republican	2015-2022	Schleswig, Iowa	
Tom Shipley	Republican	2023-2027	Adams County	
Steve Baier	Republican	2027-present		

== Historical district boundaries ==
Map	Description	Years effective	Notes
	Louisa County Washington County	1846-1851	From 1846 to 1857, district numbering was not utilized by the Iowa State Legislature. This convention was added with the passing of the 1857 Iowa Constitution. Numbering of districts pre-1857 is done as a matter of historic convenience.
	Appanoose County Davis County (partial); Decatur County; Wayne County	1852-1855	
	Clarke County Lucas County; Monroe County	1856-1859	
	Henry County	1860-1863	
	Des Moines County	1864-1867	
	Cass County Fremont County; Mills County; Pottawattamie	1868-1869	
	Cass County Mills County; Montgomery County; Pottawattamie County	1870-1871	
	Mills County Montgomery County; Pottawattamie County	1872-1873	
	Mills County Pottawattamie County	1874-1877	
	Des Moines County	1878-1962	
	Wapello County	1963-1970	
	Cerro Gordo County (partial) Franklin County (partial)	1971-1972	In 1970, the Iowa Legislature passed an amendment to the Iowa Constitution setting forth the rules for legislative redistricting in order to abide by the rules established by the Reynolds v. Sims Supreme Court case. The first reapportionment map created by the Republican controlled legislature was deemed unconstitutional, but was still used for the 1970 election.
	Allamakee County Clayton County; Delaware County (partial); Dubuque County (partial); Fayette County (partial); Winneshiek County	1973-1982	
	Franklin County Hamilton County (partial); Hancock County (partial); Hardin County; Wright County	1983-1992	
	Franklin County Hamilton County (partial); Hardin County; Wright County (partial)	1993-2002	
	Bremer County Black Hawk County (partial): Bennington Township; Lester Township; Mount Vernon Township; Washington Township; Janesville; Butler County; Fayette County (partial): Excluding; Fairfield Township; Illyria Township; Pleasant Valley Township; Putnam Township; Scott Township; Smithfield Township; Westfield Township; Arlington; Elgin; Fairbank; Fayette; Wadena	2003-2012	
	Crawford County (partial): East Boyer; Hayes Township; Iowa Township; Jackson Township; Milford Township; Nishnabotny Township; Stockholm Township; West Side Township; Aspinwall; Deloit; Manilla; Vail; Westside; Harrison County; Ida County; Monona County; Shelby County; Woodbury County (partial): Liston Township; Little Sioux Township; Miller Township; Morgan Township; Oto Township; Rock Township; Sloan Township; Willow Township; Anthon; Cushing; Danbury; Hornick; Oto; Sloan; Smithland	2013-2022	
	Adams County; Cass County; Montgomery County Page County; Ringgold County; Taylor County; Union County (partial): Excluding; Dodge Township; Jones Township; Lincoln Township; New Hope Township; Pleasant Township; Lorimor; Thayer	2023-present	

== See also ==
- Iowa General Assembly
- Iowa Senate
