= Homer Township, Benton County, Iowa =

Township in Iowa, US

Homer Township
- Township
- Location in Benton County
- Coordinates: 42°04′25″N 92°13′55″W
- Country: United States
- State: Iowa
- County: Benton

Area
  - Total: 35.80 sq mi (92.72 km^{2})
  - Land: 35.80 sq mi (92.72 km^{2})
  - Water: 0 sq mi (0 km^{2}) 0%
- Elevation: 915 ft (279 m)

Population (2000)
  - Total: 222
  - Density: 6.2/sq mi (2.4/km^{2})
- Time zone: UTC-6 (CST)
  - Summer (DST): UTC-5 (CDT)
- ZIP codes: 52224, 52225, 52229, 52249
- GNIS feature ID: 0468049

Homer Township is one of twenty townships in Benton County, Iowa, United States. As of the 2000 census, its population was 222.

== Geography ==
According to the United States Census Bureau, Homer Township covers an area of 35.8 square miles (92.72 square kilometers).

=== Unincorporated towns ===
- Rogersville at 42.108605°N 92.231574°W

(This list is based on USGS data and may include former settlements.)

=== Adjacent townships ===
- Monroe Township (north)
- Jackson Township (northeast)
- Big Grove Township (east)
- Union Township (southeast)
- Kane Township (south)
- York Township, Tama County (southwest)
- Oneida Township, Tama County (west)
- Clark Township, Tama County (northwest)

=== Cemeteries ===
The township contains these two cemeteries: Houghton and Twogood.

== School districts ==
- Benton Community School District
- Union Community School District
- Vinton-Shellsburg Community School District

== Political districts ==
- Iowa's 3rd congressional district
- State House District 39
- State Senate District 20
