= Kane Township, Benton County, Iowa =

Township in Iowa, US

Kane Township
- Township
- Location in Benton County
- Coordinates: 41°59′36″N 92°14′25″W
- Country: United States
- State: Iowa
- County: Benton

Area
  - Total: 35.59 sq mi (92.17 km^{2})
  - Land: 35.59 sq mi (92.17 km^{2})
  - Water: 0 sq mi (0 km^{2}) 0%
- Elevation: 906 ft (276 m)

Population (2000)
  - Total: 944
  - Density: 26/sq mi (10.2/km^{2})
- Time zone: UTC-6 (CST)
  - Summer (DST): UTC-5 (CDT)
- ZIP codes: 52208, 52225, 52249
- GNIS feature ID: 0468158

Kane Township is one of twenty townships in Benton County, Iowa, United States. As of the 2000 census, its population was 944.

== Geography ==
According to the United States Census Bureau, Kane Township covers an area of 35.59 square miles (92.17 square kilometers).

=== Cities, towns, villages ===
- Keystone

=== Adjacent townships ===
- Homer Township (north)
- Big Grove Township (northeast)
- Union Township (east)
- Leroy Township (southeast)
- Iowa Township (south)
- Salt Creek Township, Tama County (southwest)
- York Township, Tama County (west)
- Oneida Township, Tama County (northwest)

=== Cemeteries ===
The township contains these four cemeteries: Holy Cross, Irving, Keystone and Redman.

=== Major highways ===
- U.S. Route 30

== School districts ==
- Belle Plaine Community School District
- Benton Community School District

== Political districts ==
- Iowa's 3rd congressional district
- State House District 39
- State Senate District 20
