= Rogersville =

Rogersville may refer to:

== Places ==
Canada

- Rogersville, New Brunswick
- Rogersville Parish, New Brunswick

United States

- Rogersville, Alabama
- Rogersville, California
- Rogersville, Indiana, an unincorporated community
- Rogersville, Iowa
- Rogersville, Missouri
- Rogersville, Tennessee
- Rogersville, Wisconsin, an unincorporated community
