= Wolfdale =

Wolfdale may refer to:

- Wolfdale, Iowa
- Wolfdale, Pennsylvania
- Wolfdale (microprocessor), processor manufactured by Intel
