= Midway Independent School District =

Midway Independent School District may refer to:

- Midway Independent School District (Clay County, Texas)
- Midway Independent School District (McLennan County, Texas)
- Midway Independent School District (Woodbury County, Iowa)
