= Lucky Valley, Iowa =

Coordinates: 42.3850°N 95.9383°W

Lucky Valley is a ghost town in Woodbury County, in the U.S. state of Iowa.

== History ==
A post office was established at Lucky Valley in 1882, and remained in operation until 1903. With the construction of the railroad, most business activity and the post office shifted to nearby Anthon, and the town's population dwindled. A cemetery marks the site.
