= Lozier (disambiguation) =

Lozier was a producer of automobiles in the United States from 1900 to 1918.

Lozier may also refer to:

== Places ==
- Lozier, Iowa, a ghost town
- Lozier House and Van Riper Mill

== People with the surname ==
- Charlotte Denman Lozier (1844–1870), American physician
- Jean-Baptiste Charles Bouvet de Lozier (1705–1786), French sailor, explorer, and governor of the Mascarene Islands
- Jennie de la Montagnie Lozier (1841–1915), American physician
- John C. Lozier, American control engineer
- Ralph F. Lozier (1866–1945), U.S. Representative from Missouri
- Susan Lozier, American physical oceanographer

== Other uses ==
- Lozier Corporation, a current manufacturer of store fixtures in the United States
