= Peiro, Iowa =

Coordinates: 42.324991°N 95.982235°W

Peiro is a ghost town in Woodbury County, in the U.S. state of Iowa.

== History ==
A post office was established at Peiro in 1877, and remained in operation until 1904. Peiro Bethel Cemetery marks the site. The church was located a mile northeast of the town site.
