= Dodds, Iowa =

Coordinates: 42.4888817°N 96.1919681°W

Dodds is a ghost town in Woodbury County, in the U.S. state of Iowa.

== History ==
Dodds contained a post office between 1877 and 1886. It was located on the original stage coach route between Fort Dodge and Sioux City.
