= Luton, Iowa =

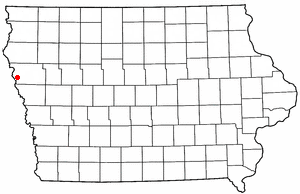
- Location in Iowa
- Coordinates: 42°20′23″N 96°13′35″W
- Country: USA
- State: Iowa
- County: Woodbury County
- Elevation: 1,079 ft (329 m)
- Time zone: UTC-6 (Central)
  - Summer (DST): UTC-5 (Central)
- GNIS feature ID: 458687

Luton is an unincorporated community located in Woodbury County, Iowa, United States. It is part of the Sioux City metropolitan area and is served by the Sergeant Bluff-Luton Community School District.

== Geography ==
Luton is located on the floodplain of the Missouri River, near Interstate 29. Brown's Lake/Bigelow County Park and Snyder Bend County Park are nearby.

== History ==
Luton's population was 98 in 1902, and 200 in 1925.

== Education ==
The Sergeant Bluff-Luton Community School District operates local area public schools.
