= Sioux City Transit =

Provider of bus transportation in Woodbury County, Iowa, US

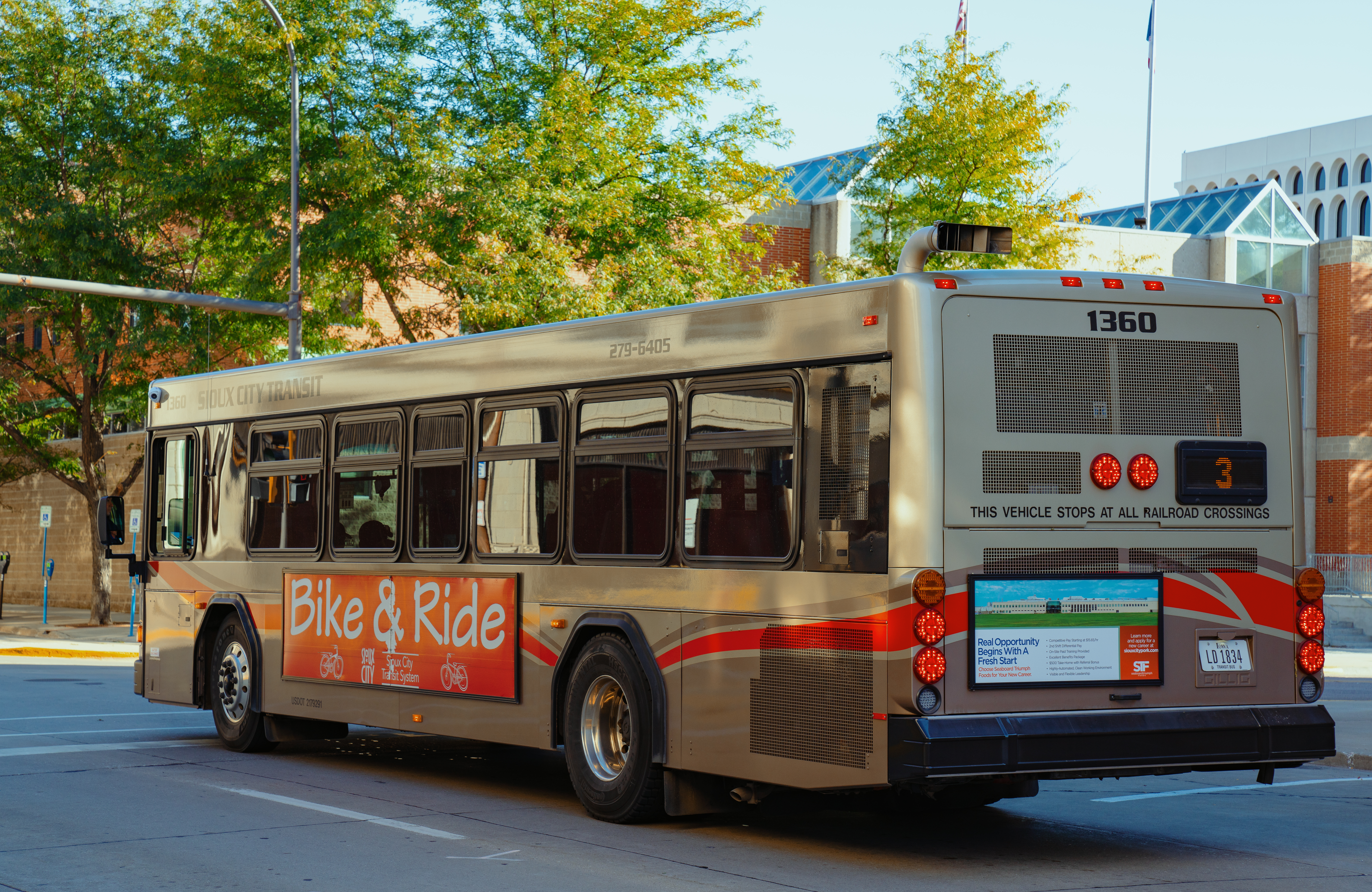
- Sioux City Transit public bus
- Headquarters: 509 Nebraska Street, Sioux City, IA
- Locale: Sioux City, Iowa
- Service area: Woodbury County, Iowa
- Service type: bus service, paratransit
- Routes: 10
- Website: sioux-city.org/transit

Sioux City Transit, is the primary provider of mass transportation in Woodbury County, Iowa. Ten routes operate from Monday through Saturday. Via Route 9, a connection can also be made with the suburb of South Sioux City, Nebraska across the Missouri River. However, beginning January 3, 2009, Route 9 only operates Monday-Friday.

== Routes ==
- 1 Mall-Commons
- 2 Pierce/Jackson
- 3 Marketplace
- 4 Leeds
- 5 Riverside
- 6 Singing Hills
- 7 Council Oaks
- 8 Indian Hills
- 9 South Sioux
- 10 Sunnybrook
- 11 Airport

== Martin Luther King Jr. Transportation Center ==
The MLK Transportation Center serves as the primary hub of Sioux City Transit, located at 505 Nebraska Street in downtown Sioux City. In addition to serving all 10 Sioux City Transit routes, the facility also serves the intercity bus carrier Jefferson Lines. The facility was constructed in February 2003 for $11.6 million. At the time, it served Greyhound Lines buses as well, but Greyhound eliminated Sioux City service in August 2004. The transportation center offers a spacious lobby for travelers to wait indoors for their buses, retail space, Sioux City Transit headquarters, 472 parking spaces, and skywalk accessibility to the Orpheum Theatre, Frances Building and access to all of the buildings in the skywalk system.

== Fixed Route Ridership ==
The ridership and service statistics shown here are of fixed route services only and do not include demand response. Per capita statistics are based on the Sioux City urbanized area as reported in NTD data. Starting in 2011, 2010 census numbers replace the 2000 census numbers to calculate per capita statistics.

	Ridership	Change	Ridership per capita
2005	799,389	n/a	7.53
2006	848,517	▲6.15%	8.0
2007	967,890	▲14.07%	9.12
2008	1,107,825	▲14.46%	10.44
2009	1,134,936	▲2.45%	10.69
2010	1,167,937	▲2.91%	11.01
2011	1,225,648	▲4.94%	11.51
2012	1,092,348	▼10.88%	10.26
2013	1,089,485	▼0.26%	10.23
2014	1,106,189	▲1.53%	10.39
2015	1,069,990	▼3.27%	10.05
2016	971,093	▼9.24%	9.12
2017	860,202	▼11.42%	8.08
2018	848,699	▼1.34%	7.97
2019	828,653	▼2.36%	7.78
2020	529,039	▼36.16%	4.97
2021	558,441	▲5.56%	5.24
2022	616,156	▲10.34%	5.79

== See also ==
- List of bus transit systems in the United States
- Sioux Area Metro
