= Correctionville, Iowa =

- City
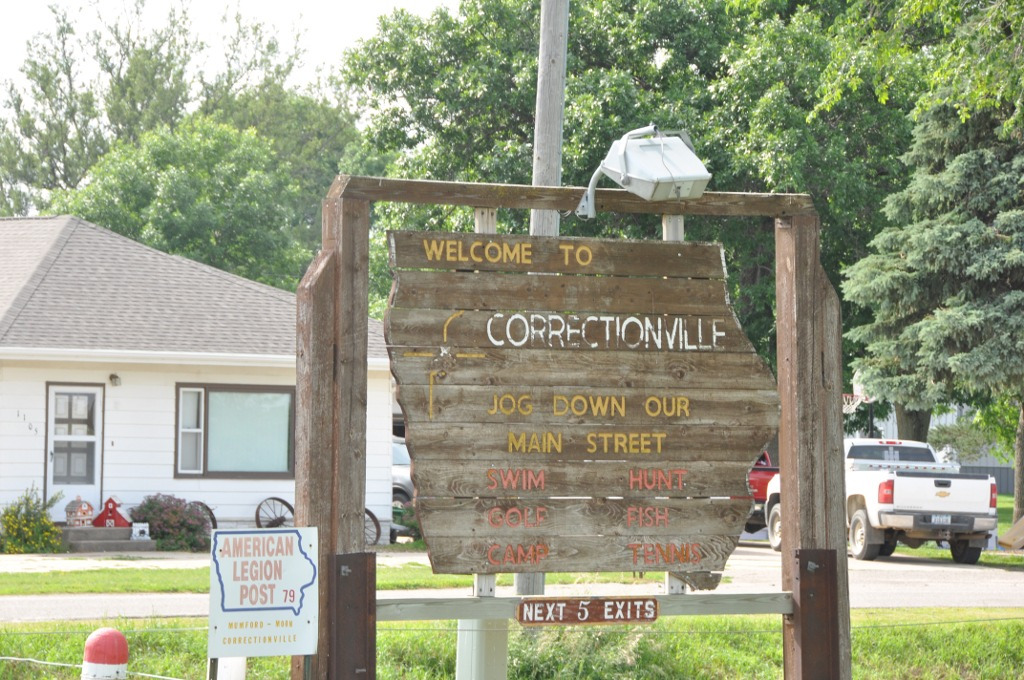
- Sign welcoming visitors

- Location of Correctionville, Iowa
- Coordinates: 42°28′39″N 95°46′59″W
- Country: US
- State: Iowa
- County: Woodbury

Area
  - Total: 0.60 sq mi (1.56 km^{2})
  - Land: 0.60 sq mi (1.56 km^{2})
  - Water: 0 sq mi (0.00 km^{2})
- Elevation: 1,139 ft (347 m)

Population (2020)
  - Total: 766
  - Density: 1,275.0/sq mi (492.29/km^{2})
- Time zone: UTC-6 (Central (CST))
  - Summer (DST): UTC-5 (CDT)
- ZIP code: 51016
- Area code: 712
- FIPS code: 19-16545
- GNIS feature ID: 2393638
- Website: correctionville.govoffice2.com

Correctionville is a city in Woodbury County, Iowa, United States. It is part of the Sioux City metropolitan area. The population was 766 at the time of the 2020 census. The town name comes from the original survey of the town. Correctionville has been noted for its unusual place name. It is supposedly the longest single-word place name in the state of Iowa.

== History ==
Correctionville was platted in 1855. It was so named from its location on a surveyors' correction line, an east-west line between baselines required because of the Earth's curvature. A post office called Correctionville has been in operation since 1862.

== Geography ==
Correctionville is situated adjacent to the Little Sioux River. U.S. Route 20 and Iowa Highway 31 pass through the town.

According to the United States Census Bureau, the city has a total area of 0.57 square miles (1.48 km^{2}), all land.

== Demographics ==
Historical populations
Year	Pop.	±%
1880	86	—
1890	869	+910.5%
1900	935	+7.6%
1910	893	−4.5%
1920	1,016	+13.8%
1930	1,058	+4.1%
1940	1,151	+8.8%
1950	992	−13.8%
1960	912	−8.1%
1970	870	−4.6%
1980	935	+7.5%
1990	897	−4.1%
2000	851	−5.1%
2010	821	−3.5%
2020	766	−6.7%
Source:"U.S. Census website". United States Census Bureau. and Iowa Data Center; Source: U.S. Decennial Census

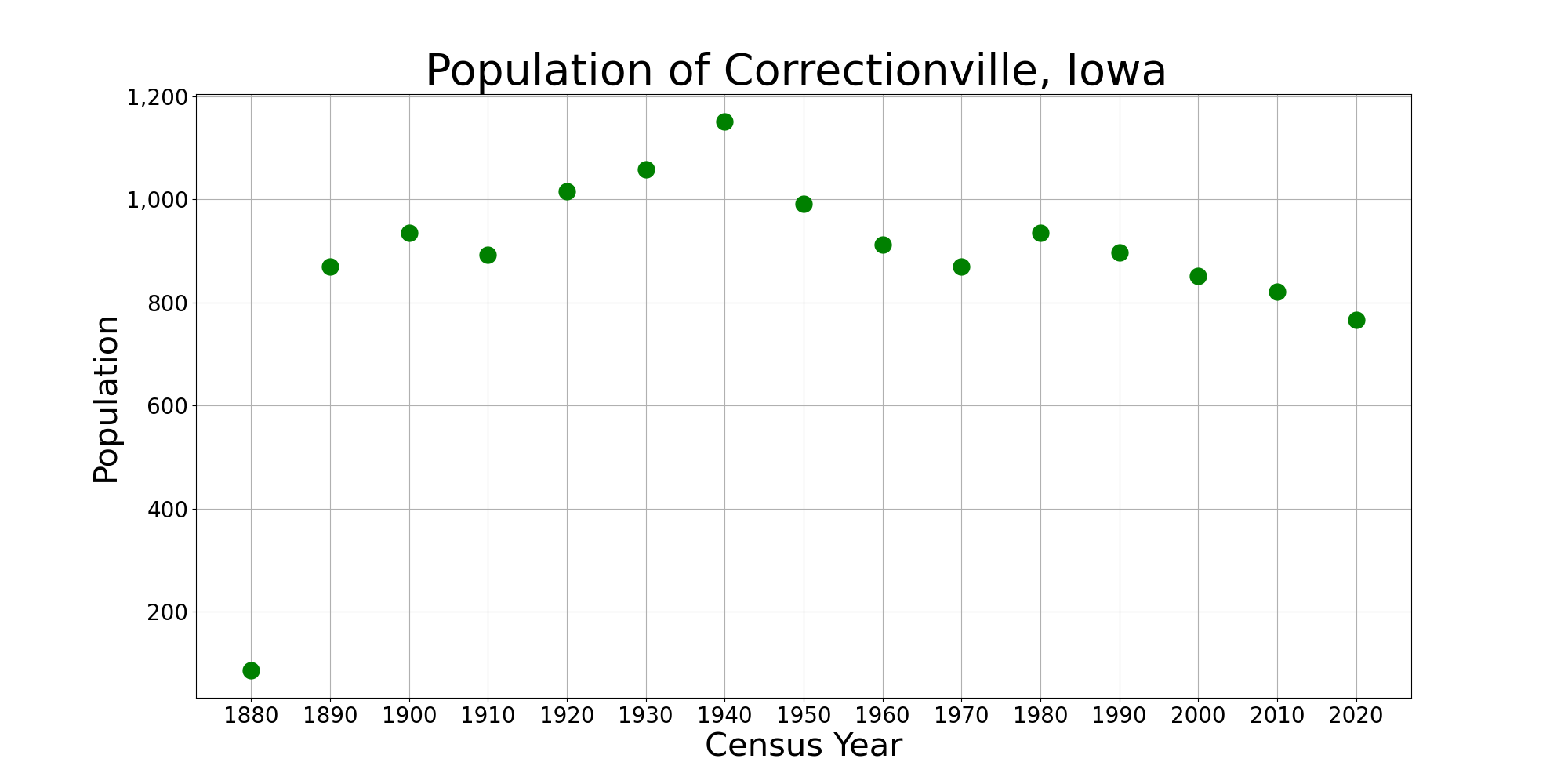
The population of Correctionville, Iowa from US census data

=== 2020 census ===
As of the census of 2020, there were 766 people, 315 households, and 189 families residing in the city. The population density was 1,275.0 inhabitants per square mile (492.3/km^{2}). There were 359 housing units at an average density of 597.6 per square mile (230.7/km^{2}). The racial makeup of the city was 92.4% White, 0.3% Black or African American, 0.9% Native American, 0.5% Asian, 0.1% Pacific Islander, 1.2% from other races and 4.6% from two or more races. Hispanic or Latino persons of any race comprised 2.2% of the population.

Of the 315 households, 31.1% of which had children under the age of 18 living with them, 41.0% were married couples living together, 11.7% were cohabitating couples, 30.2% had a female householder with no spouse or partner present and 17.1% had a male householder with no spouse or partner present. 40.0% of all households were non-families. 33.3% of all households were made up of individuals, 19.7% had someone living alone who was 65 years old or older.

The median age in the city was 40.6 years. 27.7% of the residents were under the age of 20; 5.2% were between the ages of 20 and 24; 21.0% were from 25 and 44; 20.5% were from 45 and 64; and 25.6% were 65 years of age or older. The gender makeup of the city was 48.3% male and 51.7% female.

=== 2010 census ===
As of the census of 2010, there were 821 people, 331 households, and 208 families residing in the city. The population density was 1,440.4 inhabitants per square mile (556.1/km^{2}). There were 391 housing units at an average density of 686.0 per square mile (264.9/km^{2}). The racial makeup of the city was 97.2% White, 0.2% African American, 0.6% Native American, 0.9% Asian, 0.1% from other races, and 1.0% from two or more races. Hispanic or Latino of any race were 2.3% of the population.

There were 331 households, of which 29.0% had children under the age of 18 living with them, 49.2% were married couples living together, 8.5% had a female householder with no husband present, 5.1% had a male householder with no wife present, and 37.2% were non-families. 33.8% of all households were made up of individuals, and 17.8% had someone living alone who was 65 years of age or older. The average household size was 2.36 and the average family size was 3.00.

The median age in the city was 42.8 years. 22.8% of residents were under the age of 18; 8.2% were between the ages of 18 and 24; 21% were from 25 to 44; 25.4% were from 45 to 64; and 22.8% were 65 years of age or older. The gender makeup of the city was 51.0% male and 49.0% female.

=== 2000 census ===
As of the census of 2000, there were 851 people, 343 households, and 230 families residing in the city. The population density was 1,484.5 inhabitants per square mile (573.2/km^{2}). There were 392 housing units at an average density of 683.8 per square mile (264.0/km^{2}). The racial makeup of the city was 97.65% White, 0.12% Native American, 0.24% Asian, 1.65% from other races, and 0.35% from two or more races. Hispanic or Latino of any race were 3.88% of the population.

There were 343 households, out of which 28.0% had children under the age of 18 living with them, 53.6% were married couples living together, 9.9% had a female householder with no husband present, and 32.9% were non-families. 30.0% of all households were made up of individuals, and 18.7% had someone living alone who was 65 years of age or older. The average household size was 2.38 and the average family size was 2.95.

Age/Gender Breakdown: 24.3% under the age of 18, 7.5% from 18 to 24, 23.0% from 25 to 44, 19.9% from 45 to 64, and 25.3% who were 65 years of age or older. The median age was 40 years. For every 100 females, there were 97.0 males. For every 100 females age 18 and over, there were 87.2 males.

The median income for a household in the city was $24,615, and the median income for a family was $35,000. Males had a median income of $28,250 versus $21,389 for females. The per capita income for the city was $16,074. About 12.6% of families and 17.4% of the population were below the poverty line, including 24.9% of those under age 18 and 13.1% of those age 65 or over.

== Schools ==
School	Location	Mascot	Colors	Years
River Valley	Correctionville	Wolverines		1992–present
Eastwood	Correctionville	Raiders		1966-1992
Correctionville	Correctionville	Warriors		?-1966

The River Valley Community School District operates public schools serving the community. It was established on July 1, 1996 by the merger of the Eastwood Community School District and the Willow Community School District. The Eastwood school district itself was formed on July 1, 1966 by the merger of the Correctionville and Cushing school districts.
