= Snyder Grove, Iowa =

Coordinates: 42.299991°N 96.118352°W

Snyder Grove is a ghost town in Woodbury County, in the U.S. state of Iowa. It was located on the old Iowa Highway 141.

== History ==
A post office operated under the name Snyder's Grove from 1871 until 1872.
