= German City, Iowa =

Coordinates: 42.268047°N 96.046126°W

German City is a ghost town in Woodbury County, in the U.S. state of Iowa.

== History ==
A post office was established at German City in 1886, and remained in operation until 1903. A large share of the early settlers being natives of Germany caused the name to be selected.
