= Rock Branch, Iowa =

- Unincorporated community
- Location within Iowa
- Coordinates: 42.4750°N 95.9181°W
- Country: United States
- State: Iowa
- County: Woodbury
- Elevation: 1,430 ft (440 m)
- Time zone: UTC-6 (Central (CST))
  - Summer (DST): UTC-5 (CDT)
- Area code: 712
- GNIS feature ID: 466265

Rock Branch is an unincorporated community in Woodbury County, Iowa, United States.

== History ==
A post office was established at Rock Branch in 1872, and remained in operation until 1904. The community took its name from Rock Creek. Little remains of the original community.
