= Midway, Woodbury County, Iowa =

Midway, Iowa
- Unincorporated community
- Location within Iowa
- Coordinates: 42°22′15″N 95°43′44″W
- Country: United States
- State: Iowa
- County: Woodbury
- Elevation: 1,457 ft (444 m)
- Time zone: UTC-6 (Central (CST))
  - Summer (DST): UTC-5 (CDT)
- Area code: 712
- GNIS feature ID: 464116

Midway is an unincorporated community in Woodbury County, Iowa, United States. Midway is located on County Highway D38, 7.15 miles (11.51 km) east of Anthon.

== History ==
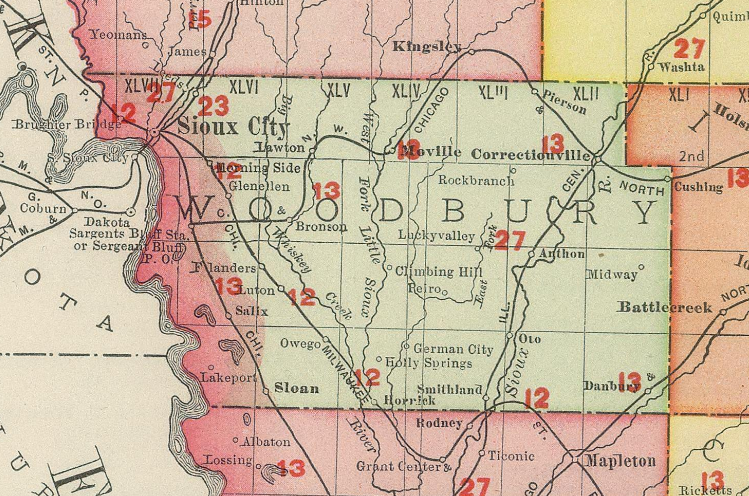
Woodbury County Iowa, 1903, showing the location of Midway.

Midway was once home to schools, St. Paul's Church, a post office, and a number of businesses. The post office at Midway operated from 1890 to 1907.

The congregation of St. Paul Lutheran Church of Midway was founded on July 3, 1892, when seven families began having services at the Midway District #2 school. The first church building was constructed in 1898. By 1912, the church had 582 baptized members. After a lightning strike in 1919, the original church building was replaced in 1920. A larger church replaced the 1920 church in 1959. St. Paul's of Midway celebrated its 125th anniversary in 2017.

The Midway Independent School District, which operated as a one-room schoolhouse, was slated to close in 1963, but was still operating in 1967.
