= River Valley Community School District =

Public school district in Correctionville, Iowa, United States

Coordinates: 42.480228°N 95.779840°W

Location
- Correctionville, Iowa Cherokee, Ida, and Woodbury counties United States
- Coordinates: 42.480228, -95.779840

District information
- Type: Local school district
- Grades: K-12
- Established: 1996
- Superintendent: Kenneth Slater
- Schools: 2
- Budget: $6,673,000 (2020-21)
- NCES District ID: 1910340

Students and staff
- Students: 342 (2022-23)
- Teachers: 31.40 FTE
- Staff: 49.36 FTE
- Student–teacher ratio: 10.89
- Athletic conference: Western Valley Activities Conference
- District mascot: Wolverines
- Colors: Red and Silver

Other information
- Website: www.rvwolverines.org

River Valley Community School District is a rural public school district headquartered in Correctionville, Iowa. It includes sections of Cherokee, Ida, and Woodbury counties. It serves Correctionville, Cushing, Quimby, and Washta.

== History ==
It was established on July 1, 1996, by the merger of the Eastwood Community School District and the Willow Community School District.

In February 2026, the school board voted unanimously to transition from a five-day to a four-day school week, beginning with the 2026–27 academic year. Superintendent Scott Bailey cited declining enrollment as a factor in the decision.

== Schools ==
- River Valley Junior/Senior High School
- River Valley Elementary School

Previously it was divided into River Valley Elementary, River Valley Middle, and River Valley High.

=== River Valley High School ===
==== Athletics ====
The Wolverines compete in the Western Valley Activities Conference in the following sports:

- Cross Country
- Volleyball
- Football
- Basketball
- Track and Field
- Golf
- Baseball
- Softball

== See also ==
- List of school districts in Iowa
- List of high schools in Iowa
