= Grange, Iowa =

Ghost town in Woodbury County, Iowa, United States

Coordinates: 42.378325°N 96.215579°W

Grange is a ghost town in Woodbury County, in the U.S. state of Iowa.

== History ==
Grange only ever appeared on the county maps of 1875. A short-lived post office was established at Grange in 1877 in and was discontinued in 1878. The Grange Post Office was located in Section 5 of Grange Township. The Grange Cemetery marks the site. The Cemetery is located in Section 14 of Grange Township in Woodbury County Iowa.
