= Climbing Hill, Iowa =

- Census-designated place
- Location within the state of Iowa Climbing Hill, Iowa (the United States)
- Coordinates: 42°20′30″N 96°4′40″W
- Country: United States
- State: Iowa
- County: Woodbury

Area
  - Total: 1.28 sq mi (3.32 km^{2})
  - Land: 1.28 sq mi (3.32 km^{2})
  - Water: 0 sq mi (0.00 km^{2})
- Elevation: 1,119 ft (341 m)

Population (2020)
  - Total: 97
  - Density: 75.8/sq mi (29.25/km^{2})
- Time zone: UTC-6 (Central (CST))
  - Summer (DST): UTC-5 (CDT)
- ZIP codes: 51015
- Area code: 712
- FIPS code: 19-14385
- GNIS feature ID: 2629960

Climbing Hill is an unincorporated community and census-designated place (CDP) in Woodbury County, Iowa, United States. The community is part of the Sioux City, IA–NE–SD Metropolitan Statistical Area. It has a post office with the ZIP code 51015. Its population at the time of the 2020 census was 97 persons.

== Demographics ==
Historical population
Census	Pop.	Note	%±
2010	97		—
2020	97		0.0%
U.S. Decennial Census

=== 2020 census ===
As of the census of 2020, there were 97 people, 44 households, and 35 families residing in the community. The population density was 75.7 inhabitants per square mile (29.2/km^{2}). There were 45 housing units at an average density of 35.1 per square mile (13.6/km^{2}). The racial makeup of the community was 94.8% White, 1.0% Black or African American, 1.0% Native American, 0.0% Asian, 0.0% Pacific Islander, 0.0% from other races and 3.1% from two or more races. Hispanic or Latino persons of any race comprised 1.0% of the population.

Of the 44 households, 6.8% of which had children under the age of 18 living with them, 72.7% were married couples living together, 2.3% were cohabitating couples, 4.5% had a female householder with no spouse or partner present and 20.5% had a male householder with no spouse or partner present. 20.5% of all households were non-families. 18.2% of all households were made up of individuals, 15.9% had someone living alone who was 65 years old or older.

The median age in the community was 52.5 years. 22.7% of the residents were under the age of 20; 2.1% were between the ages of 20 and 24; 16.5% were from 25 and 44; 29.9% were from 45 and 64; and 28.9% were 65 years of age or older. The gender makeup of the community was 42.3% male and 57.7% female.

== History ==
The community was named by C. E. Ostrander, the first settler and postmaster, whose home was on high ground and could not be reached except by climbing a hill. The name was kept, though the community was moved several times and was finally located on level land circa 1867. Climbing Hill's population was 37 in 1902, and 83 in 1925. The population was 150 in 1940. Climbing Hill is also known as home of the Hancocks & McCoys.
