= Sergeant Bluff-Luton Community School District =

Public school district in Sergeant Bluff, Iowa, United States

Coordinates: 41.662855°N 92.018800°W

Location
- Sergeant Bluff, Iowa Woodbury County United States
- Coordinates: 41.662855, -92.018800

District information
- Type: Local school district
- Grades: K-12
- Established: 1958
- Superintendent: Chad Janzen
- Schools: 4
- Budget: $24,054,000 (2020-21)
- NCES District ID: 1925590

Students and staff
- Students: 1729 (2022-23)
- Teachers: 112.22 FTE
- Staff: 1118.30 FTE
- Student–teacher ratio: 15.41
- Athletic conference: Missouri River
- District mascot: Warriors
- Colors: Orange and Black

Other information
- Website: www.sblschools.com

The Sergeant Bluff-Luton School District is a rural public school district located in Sergeant Bluff, Iowa.

The school district, entirely in Woodbury County, provides education for students living in Sergeant Bluff and Luton. A small portion of Sioux City is in the district boundaries.

Many students also open-enroll from nearby Sioux City.

== Schools ==
=== Primary school ===
Located on 206 South D St, Sergeant Bluff-Luton Primary School is the oldest of the four schools in the district, completed in 1959 (according to its foundation plaque on display at the front office in the building). It has 42 staff and approximately 450 students.

In November of 2026, voters approved a $38 million bond referendum to build a new primary building attached to the Elementary and demolish the current aged Primary school.

=== Elementary school ===
As the newest school in the district, the school was completed in time to host the class of 2001 as the first class to graduate from its new gymnasium (completed in the summer of 2000 according to the official dedication plaque outside the main office). The school hosts the 3rd, 4th, and 5th grades.

=== Middle school ===
The Sergeant Bluff-Luton Middle School is located on 208 Port Neal Road, Sergeant Bluff, Iowa. The third oldest school in the district, it was completed in time for the class of 1989 to graduate (according to the official plaque outside the main office in the building). Originally, the 7th and 8th grade classes were in the same wing. As enrollment increased in the late 2000s, a new wing to the north of the building was built to split the 8th grade classes from the 7th grade wing. The school houses the 6th, 7th and 8th grades with about 400 students currently enrolled.

=== High school ===
The Sergeant Bluff-Luton High School is a public school located in Sergeant Bluff, Iowa. The school provides education for Sergeant Bluff students, as well as students in nearby Luton, Iowa.

Located at 708 Warrior Road, Sergeant Bluff-Luton High School is the second oldest of the four schools in the district, completed in 1977 (according to the plaque located outside the main office in the building). The first class to graduate from this building was the class of 1978.

Because of a steady growth in school attendance, propositions for an addition have been brought up, but have been voted against.

In May 2010, the district had begun planning out and zoning for more parking lot space to be added. The project was completed by the beginning of the 2010–11 school year.

==== Athletics ====
The Warriors compete in the Missouri River Conference in the following sports:

- Baseball
- Basketball
- Bowling
- Cross Country
- Football
- Golf
- Soccer
- Softball
- Track and Field
  - Boys' 2019 Class 3A State Champions
- Volleyball
  - 2019 Class 4A State Champions
- Wrestling

== Format ==
All 4 of the Sergeant Bluff-Luton schools follow a Semester format and the High School uses block scheduling with four 90-minute classes a day.

Students have alternating "A" and "B" days and therefore only have each of their classes two or three times a week.

The district converted to semesters from trimesters for the 2010-11 year.

== See also ==
- List of school districts in Iowa
- List of high schools in Iowa
