= Cushing, Iowa =

- City
- Location of Cushing, Iowa
- Coordinates: 42°27′54″N 95°40′33″W
- Country: USA
- State: Iowa
- County: Woodbury

Area
  - Total: 0.32 sq mi (0.82 km^{2})
  - Land: 0.32 sq mi (0.82 km^{2})
  - Water: 0 sq mi (0.00 km^{2})
- Elevation: 1,296 ft (395 m)

Population (2020)
  - Total: 230
  - Density: 724/sq mi (279.6/km^{2})
- Time zone: UTC-6 (Central (CST))
  - Summer (DST): UTC-5 (CDT)
- ZIP code: 51018
- Area code: 712
- FIPS code: 19-17940
- GNIS feature ID: 2393701

Cushing is a city in Woodbury County, Iowa, United States. It is part of the Sioux City, IA–NE–SD Metropolitan Statistical Area. The population was 230 at the time of the 2020 census.

== History ==
A post office called Cushing has been in operation since 1883. The city was named for L. Cushing Kimball, brother of a railroad official.

== Geography ==
According to the United States Census Bureau, the city has a total area of 0.32 square miles (0.83 km^{2}), all land.

== Demographics ==
Historical populations
Year	Pop.	±%
1900	237	—
1910	254	+7.2%
1920	286	+12.6%
1930	270	−5.6%
1940	258	−4.4%
1950	248	−3.9%
1960	261	+5.2%
1970	204	−21.8%
1980	270	+32.4%
1990	241	−10.7%
2000	246	+2.1%
2010	220	−10.6%
2020	230	+4.5%
Source:"U.S. Census website". United States Census Bureau. and Iowa Data Center; Source: U.S. Decennial Census

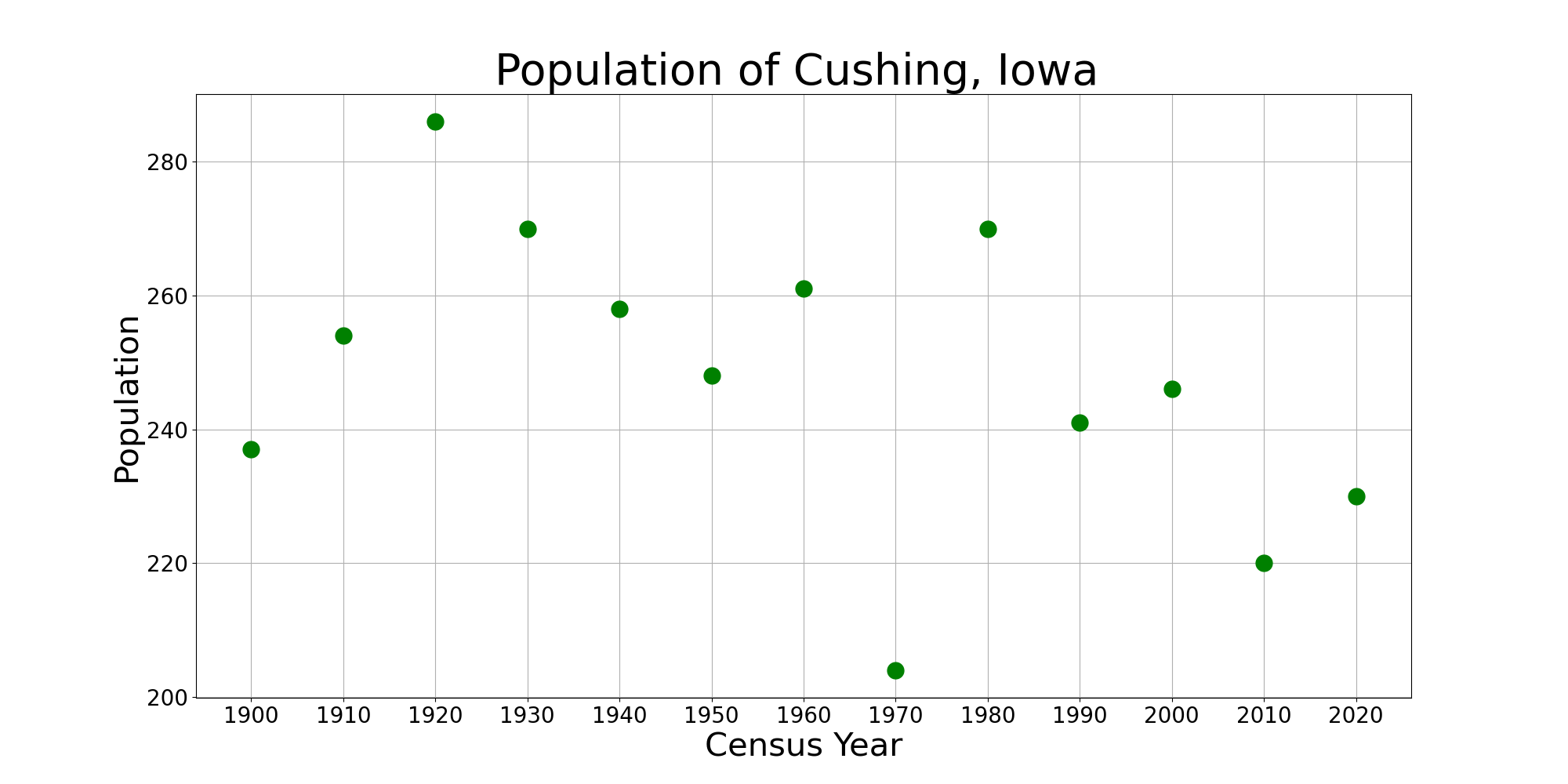
The population of Cushing, Iowa from US census data

=== 2020 census ===
As of the census of 2020, there were 230 people, 86 households, and 64 families residing in the city. The population density was 724.1 inhabitants per square mile (279.6/km^{2}). There were 109 housing units at an average density of 343.2 per square mile (132.5/km^{2}). The racial makeup of the city was 95.7% White, 0.0% Black or African American, 0.4% Native American, 0.0% Asian, 0.0% Pacific Islander, 0.0% from other races and 3.9% from two or more races. Hispanic or Latino persons of any race comprised 3.0% of the population.

Of the 86 households, 34.9% of which had children under the age of 18 living with them, 59.3% were married couples living together, 9.3% were cohabitating couples, 14.0% had a female householder with no spouse or partner present and 17.4% had a male householder with no spouse or partner present. 25.6% of all households were non-families. 18.6% of all households were made up of individuals, 7.0% had someone living alone who was 65 years old or older.

The median age in the city was 34.8 years. 29.1% of the residents were under the age of 20; 3.9% were between the ages of 20 and 24; 22.2% were from 25 and 44; 27.8% were from 45 and 64; and 17.0% were 65 years of age or older. The gender makeup of the city was 52.6% male and 47.4% female.

=== 2010 census ===
As of the census of 2010, there were 220 people, 99 households, and 58 families living in the city. The population density was 687.5 inhabitants per square mile (265.4/km^{2}). There were 115 housing units at an average density of 359.4 per square mile (138.8/km^{2}). The racial makeup of the city was 99.5% White and 0.5% from two or more races. Hispanic or Latino of any race were 2.7% of the population.

There were 99 households, of which 24.2% had children under the age of 18 living with them, 53.5% were married couples living together, 1.0% had a female householder with no husband present, 4.0% had a male householder with no wife present, and 41.4% were non-families. 36.4% of all households were made up of individuals, and 17.1% had someone living alone who was 65 years of age or older. The average household size was 2.22 and the average family size was 2.98.

The median age in the city was 42.5 years. 25.5% of residents were under the age of 18; 5.3% were between the ages of 18 and 24; 21.9% were from 25 to 44; 26.8% were from 45 to 64; and 20.5% were 65 years of age or older. The gender makeup of the city was 52.7% male and 47.3% female.

=== 2000 census ===
As of the census of 2000, there were 246 people, 104 households, and 66 families living in the city. The population density was 771.9 inhabitants per square mile (298.0/km^{2}). There were 118 housing units at an average density of 370.3 per square mile (143.0/km^{2}). The racial makeup of the city was 100.00% White. Hispanic or Latino of any race were 0.41% of the population.

There were 104 households, out of which 31.7% had children under the age of 18 living with them, 55.8% were married couples living together, 4.8% had a female householder with no husband present, and 36.5% were non-families. 32.7% of all households were made up of individuals, and 23.1% had someone living alone who was 65 years of age or older. The average household size was 2.37 and the average family size was 2.98.

In the city, the population was spread out, with 26.8% under the age of 18, 5.7% from 18 to 24, 26.8% from 25 to 44, 19.9% from 45 to 64, and 20.7% who were 65 years of age or older. The median age was 40 years. For every 100 females, there were 87.8 males. For every 100 females age 18 and over, there were 87.5 males.

The median income for a household in the city was $37,500, and the median income for a family was $47,000. Males had a median income of $29,844 versus $21,719 for females. The per capita income for the city was $18,408. About 2.9% of families and 6.7% of the population were below the poverty line, including 5.5% of those under the age of eighteen and 10.0% of those 65 or over.

== Education ==
The River Valley Community School District operates public schools serving the community. It was established on July 1, 1996 by the merger of the Eastwood Community School District and the Willow Community School District. The Eastwood school district itself was formed on July 1, 1966 by the merger of the Correctionville and Cushing school districts.

== Notable person ==
- Kelly Goodburn, punter in the NFL
