= Liberty Township, Woodbury County, Iowa =

Township in Iowa, USA

Coordinates: 42°21′N 96°20′W

Liberty Township is a township in Woodbury County, Iowa, United States.
