= Kedron Township, Woodbury County, Iowa =

Township in Iowa, USA

Coordinates: 42.4270°N 95.8454°W

Kedron Township is a township in Woodbury County, Iowa, United States.

== Details ==
Discord is a former unincorporated community in Kedron Township. A post office was established at Discord in 1870, and remained in operation until 1884.

The origin of the name "Discord" is obscure. Discord has been called the "best representation of complete abandonment [in the area] now marked only by a sign."
