= Union Township, Woodbury County, Iowa =

Township in Iowa, USA

Coordinates: 42°31′N 95°48′W

Union Township is a township in Woodbury County, Iowa, United States.
