= Grant Township, Woodbury County, Iowa =

Township in Iowa, USA

Coordinates: 42°21′N 95°58′W

Grant Township is a township in Woodbury County, Iowa, United States.
