= Smithland, Iowa =

- City
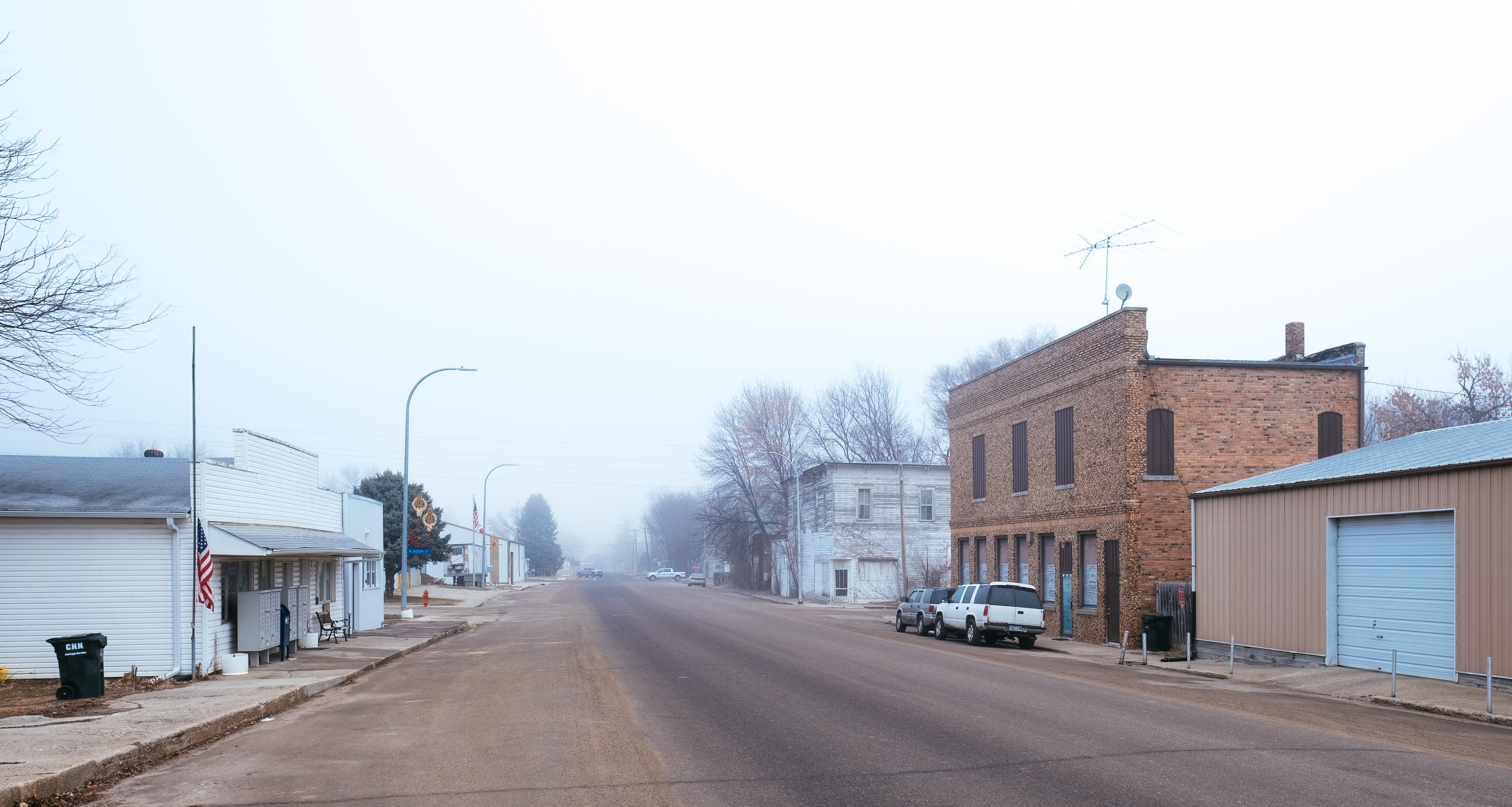
- Hickory Street looking north from Jackson Street

- Location of Smithland, Iowa
- Coordinates: 42°13′44″N 95°55′54″W
- Country: USA
- State: Iowa
- County: Woodbury

Area
  - Total: 0.32 sq mi (0.83 km^{2})
  - Land: 0.32 sq mi (0.83 km^{2})
  - Water: 0 sq mi (0.00 km^{2})
- Elevation: 1,089 ft (332 m)

Population (2020)
  - Total: 181
  - Density: 564.3/sq mi (217.88/km^{2})
- Time zone: UTC-6 (Central (CST))
  - Summer (DST): UTC-5 (CDT)
- ZIP code: 51056
- Area code: 712
- FIPS code: 19-73650
- GNIS feature ID: 2395901

Smithland is a city in Woodbury County, Iowa, United States. It is part of the Sioux City, IA–NE–SD Metropolitan Statistical Area. The population was 181 at the time of the 2020 census.

== History ==
Smithland is one of the oldest settlements in Woodbury County. In 1857, clashes between settlers and Native Americans began at what is now Smithland which would afterward culminate in the Spirit Lake Massacre.

== Geography ==
Smithland is situated near the Little Sioux River, where the river valley courses through the Loess Hills on its way to the floodplain of the Missouri River.

According to the United States Census Bureau, the city has a total area of 0.37 square miles (0.96 km^{2}), all land.

== Demographics ==
Historical populations
| Year | Pop. | ±% |
|---|---|---|
| 1890 | 369 | — |
| 1900 | 435 | +17.9% |
| 1910 | 334 | −23.2% |
| 1920 | 321 | −3.9% |
| 1930 | 389 | +21.2% |
| 1940 | 389 | +0.0% |
| 1950 | 373 | −4.1% |
| 1960 | 349 | −6.4% |
| 1970 | 293 | −16.0% |
| 1980 | 282 | −3.8% |
| 1990 | 252 | −10.6% |
| 2000 | 221 | −12.3% |
| 2010 | 224 | +1.4% |
| 2020 | 181 | −19.2% |
Source:"U.S. Census website". United States Census Bureau. and Iowa Data Center; Source: U.S. Decennial Census

=== 2020 census ===
As of the census of 2020, there were 181 people, 83 households, and 54 families residing in the city. The population density was 564.3 inhabitants per square mile (217.9/km^{2}). There were 102 housing units at an average density of 318.0 per square mile (122.8/km^{2}). The racial makeup of the city was 96.1% White, 0.0% Black or African American, 0.0% Native American, 0.6% Asian, 0.0% Pacific Islander, 2.2% from other races and 1.1% from two or more races. Hispanic or Latino persons of any race comprised 3.3% of the population.

Of the 83 households, 25.3% of which had children under the age of 18 living with them, 49.4% were married couples living together, 6.0% were cohabitating couples, 27.7% had a female householder with no spouse or partner present and 16.9% had a male householder with no spouse or partner present. 34.9% of all households were non-families. 22.9% of all households were made up of individuals, 12.0% had someone living alone who was 65 years old or older.

The median age in the city was 47.3 years. 15.5% of the residents were under the age of 20; 8.3% were between the ages of 20 and 24; 23.2% were from 25 and 44; 21.5% were from 45 and 64; and 31.5% were 65 years of age or older. The gender makeup of the city was 51.4% male and 48.6% female.

=== 2010 census ===
At the 2010 census, there were 224 people, 100 households and 65 families living in the city. The population density was 605.4 inhabitants per square mile (233.7/km^{2}). There were 109 housing units at an average density of 294.6 per square mile (113.7/km^{2}). The racial makeup of the city was 97.3% White, 2.2% from other races, and 0.4% from two or more races. Hispanic or Latino of any race were 3.1% of the population.

There were 100 households, of which 23.0% had children under the age of 18 living with them, 44.0% were married couples living together, 13.0% had a female householder with no husband present, 8.0% had a male householder with no wife present, and 35.0% were non-families. 32.0% of all households were made up of individuals, and 21% had someone living alone who was 65 years of age or older. The average household size was 2.24 and the average family size was 2.66.

The median age was 49 years. 19.6% of residents were under the age of 18; 7.2% were between the ages of 18 and 24; 19.7% were from 25 to 44; 28.6% were from 45 to 64; and 25% were 65 years of age or older. The gender makeup of the city was 50.4% male and 49.6% female.

=== 2000 census ===
At the 2000 census, there were 221 people, 101 households and 72 families living in the city. The population density was 613.0 inhabitants per square mile (236.7/km^{2}). There were 114 housing units at an average density of 316.2 per square mile (122.1/km^{2}). The racial makeup of the city was 99.10% White, 0.45% Native American, and 0.45% from two or more races. Hispanic or Latino of any race were 0.45% of the population.

There were 101 households, of which 19.8% had children under the age of 18 living with them, 56.4% were married couples living together, 8.9% had a female householder with no husband present, and 28.7% were non-families. 27.7% of all households were made up of individuals, and 15.8% had someone living alone who was 65 years of age or older. The average household size was 2.19 and the average family size was 2.60.

19.0% of the population were under the age of 18, 7.2% from 18 to 24, 17.2% from 25 to 44, 29.4% from 45 to 64, and 27.1% who were 65 years of age or older. The median age was 49 years. For every 100 females, there were 100.9 males. For every 100 females age 18 and over, there were 90.4 males.

The median household income was $31,406 and the median family income was $33,750. Males had a median income of $31,250 and females $17,188. The per capita income was $14,722. About 4.0% of families and 6.4% of the population were below the poverty line, including 7.0% of those under the age of eighteen and none of those 65 or over.
