= Lozier, Iowa =

Coordinates: 42.5472°N 95.9003°W

Lozier is a ghost town in Woodbury County, in the U.S. state of Iowa.

== History ==
A post office was established at Lozier in 1880, and was discontinued in 1882. With the construction of the railroad east of the town, business activity shifted to nearby Pierson that had grown around the newly laid tracks, and Lozier's population dwindled.
