= Woodbury Township, Woodbury County, Iowa =

Township in Iowa, US

Coordinates: 42.4202°N 96.3001°W

Woodbury Township is a township in Woodbury County, Iowa, United States.
