= Wolf Creek Township, Woodbury County, Iowa =

Township in Iowa, USA

Coordinates: 42.4322°N 95.9599°W

Wolf Creek Township is a township in Woodbury County, Iowa, United States.
