= Wolfdale, Iowa =

Coordinates: 42.481936°N 95.987794°W

Wolfdale is a ghost town in Woodbury County, in the U.S. state of Iowa.

== History ==
A post office was established at Wolfdale in 1868, and remained in operation until 1900. It was located on the main stage coach route along Correctionville Road.
