= Banner Township, Woodbury County, Iowa =

Township in Iowa, USA

Coordinates: 42.5175°N 96.1537°W

Banner Township is a township in Woodbury County, Iowa, United States.
