= West Fork Township, Woodbury County, Iowa =

Township in Iowa, USA

Coordinates: 42°21′N 96°05′W

West Fork Township is a township in Woodbury County, Iowa, United States.
