= Liberty Township, Cherokee County, Iowa =

Township in Iowa, US

Liberty Township
- Township
- Coordinates: 42°52′07″N 095°41′27″W
- Country: United States
- State: Iowa
- County: Cherokee

Area
  - Total: 35.97 sq mi (93.15 km^{2})
  - Land: 35.96 sq mi (93.14 km^{2})
  - Water: 0.0039 sq mi (0.01 km^{2})
- Elevation: 1,404 ft (428 m)

Population (2000)
  - Total: 219
  - Density: 6.2/sq mi (2.4/km^{2})
- FIPS code: 19-92442
- GNIS feature ID: 0468213

Liberty Township is one of sixteen townships in Cherokee County, Iowa, United States. As of the 2000 census, its population was 219.

== Geography ==
Liberty Township covers an area of 35.97 square miles (93.2 km^{2}) and contains no incorporated settlements. According to the USGS, it contains one cemetery, Liberty.
