= Lynn Township, Sioux County, Iowa =

Township in Iowa, USA

Coordinates: 43°08′N 95°55′W

Lynn Township is a township in Sioux County, Iowa, USA.
