= East Boyer Township, Crawford County, Iowa =

East Boyer Township
- Township
- Location in Crawford County
- Coordinates: 41°59′54″N 095°15′25″W
- Country: United States
- State: Iowa
- County: Crawford

Area
  - Total: 35.03 sq mi (90.74 km^{2})
  - Land: 34.97 sq mi (90.56 km^{2})
  - Water: 0.069 sq mi (0.18 km^{2}) 0.2%
- Elevation: 1,309 ft (399 m)

Population (2000)
  - Total: 424
  - Density: 12/sq mi (4.7/km^{2})
- GNIS feature ID: 0467752

East Boyer Township is a township in Crawford County, Iowa, United States. At the 2000 census, its population was 424.

== Geography ==
The township covers an area of 35.04 square miles (90.8 km^{2}) and contains no incorporated settlements. According to the USGS, it contains one cemetery, Old Catholic.

The streams of Hay Creek, Rocky Run and Walnut Creek run through the township.
