= Cherokee Township, Cherokee County, Iowa =

Township in Iowa, US

Cherokee Township
- Township
- Coordinates: 42°46′46″N 095°33′46″W
- Country: United States
- State: Iowa
- County: Cherokee

Area
  - Total: 35.98 sq mi (93.19 km^{2})
  - Land: 35.9 sq mi (93.1 km^{2})
  - Water: 0.035 sq mi (0.09 km^{2})
- Elevation: 1,368 ft (417 m)

Population (2000)
  - Total: 6,073
  - Density: 169/sq mi (65.2/km^{2})
- FIPS code: 19-90654
- GNIS feature ID: 0467596

Cherokee Township is one of sixteen townships in Cherokee County, Iowa, United States. As of the 2000 census, its population was 6,073.

== Geography ==
Cherokee Township covers an area of 35.98 square miles (93.2 km^{2}) and contains one incorporated settlement, Cherokee (the county seat). According to the USGS, it contains four cemeteries: Memory Gardens, Mental Health Institute, Mount Calvary and Oak Hill.
