= East Orange Township, Sioux County, Iowa =

Township in Iowa, USA

Coordinates: 42°57′N 95°55′W

East Orange Township is a township in Sioux County, Iowa, United States.
