= Clay Township, Clay County, Iowa =

Township in Iowa, US

Clay Township
- Township
- Location in Clay County
- Coordinates: 43°02′27″N 095°19′39″W
- Country: United States
- State: Iowa
- County: Clay

Area
  - Total: 36.35 sq mi (94.15 km^{2})
  - Land: 36.35 sq mi (94.15 km^{2})
  - Water: 0 sq mi (0 km^{2}) 0%
- Elevation: 1,401 ft (427 m)

Population (2000)
  - Total: 696
  - Density: 19/sq mi (7.4/km^{2})
- GNIS feature ID: 0467602

Clay Township is a township in Clay County, Iowa, USA. As of the 2000 census, its population was 696.

== History ==
Clay Township was the first township in Clay County. When it was created in 1859, it comprised the entire county.

== Geography ==
Clay Township covers an area of 36.35 square miles (94.1 km^{2}) and contains one incorporated settlement, Royal. According to the USGS, it contains three cemeteries: Center, TriMello and Willow Creek.

== Transportation ==
Clay Township contains one airport or landing strip, Royal Airport.
