= Spring Township, Cherokee County, Iowa =

Township in Iowa, US

Spring Township
- Township
- Coordinates: 42°51′41″N 095°26′35″W
- Country: United States
- State: Iowa
- County: Cherokee

Area
  - Total: 36.20 sq mi (93.76 km^{2})
  - Land: 36.20 sq mi (93.76 km^{2})
  - Water: 0 sq mi (0 km^{2})
- Elevation: 1,365 ft (416 m)

Population (2000)
  - Total: 163
  - Density: 4.4/sq mi (1.7/km^{2})
- FIPS code: 19-93963
- GNIS feature ID: 0468735

Spring Township is one of sixteen townships in Cherokee County, Iowa, United States. As of the 2000 census, its population was 163.

== Geography ==
Spring Township covers an area of 36.2 square miles (94 km^{2}) and contains no incorporated settlements. According to the USGS, it contains two cemeteries: Spring and Spring Township.
