= Jackson Township, Crawford County, Iowa =

Jackson Township
- Township
- Location in Crawford County
- Coordinates: 42°09′58″N 095°08′45″W
- Country: United States
- State: Iowa
- County: Crawford

Area
  - Total: 35.74 sq mi (92.57 km^{2})
  - Land: 35.73 sq mi (92.54 km^{2})
  - Water: 0.012 sq mi (0.03 km^{2}) 0.03%
- Elevation: 1,380 ft (420 m)

Population (2000)
  - Total: 180
  - Density: 4.9/sq mi (1.9/km^{2})
- GNIS feature ID: 0468097

Jackson Township is a township in Crawford County, Iowa, USA. As of the 2000 census, its population was 180.

== Geography ==
Jackson Township covers an area of 35.74 square miles (92.6 km^{2}) and contains no incorporated settlements.

The stream of Beamon Creek runs through this township.

== Transportation ==
Jackson Township contains one airport or landing strip, Lawler Landing Strip.
