= Pleasant Township, Union County, Iowa =

Township in Iowa, U.S.

Coordinates: 40°56′26″N 94°04′19″W

Pleasant Township is a township in Union County, Iowa, United States.
