= Hayes Township, Crawford County, Iowa =

Hayes Township
- Township
- Location in Crawford County
- Coordinates: 41°59′24″N 095°08′29″W
- Country: United States
- State: Iowa
- County: Crawford

Area
  - Total: 35.07 sq mi (90.83 km^{2})
  - Land: 35.07 sq mi (90.83 km^{2})
  - Water: 0 sq mi (0 km^{2}) 0%
- Elevation: 1,440 ft (439 m)

Population (2000)
  - Total: 274
  - Density: 7.8/sq mi (3/km^{2})
- GNIS feature ID: 0468021

Hayes Township is a township in Crawford County, Iowa, United States. As of the 2000 census, its population was 274.

The township was named after Thomas Hayes Sr., a pioneer settler.

== Geography ==
Hayes Township covers an area of 35.07 square miles (90.8 km^{2}) and contains no incorporated settlements. According to the USGS, it contains one cemeteries, Hayes Township Cemetery.

The stream of Malony Branch runs through this township.

== Transportation ==
Hayes Township contains one airport or landing strip, Lenz Landing Strip.
