= Dodge Township, Union County, Iowa =

Township in Iowa, U.S.

Coordinates: 41°06′49″N 94°11′06″W

Dodge Township is a township in Union County, Iowa, United States.
