= Iowa Township, Crawford County, Iowa =

Iowa Township
- Township
- Location in Crawford County
- Coordinates: 41°54′24″N 095°09′00″W
- Country: United States
- State: Iowa
- County: Crawford

Area
  - Total: 36.2 sq mi (93.7 km^{2})
  - Land: 36.2 sq mi (93.7 km^{2})
  - Water: 0 sq mi (0 km^{2}) 0%
- Elevation: 1,350 ft (410 m)

Population (2000)
  - Total: 356
  - Density: 9.8/sq mi (3.8/km^{2})
- GNIS feature ID: 0468079

Iowa Township is a township in Crawford County, Iowa, United States. At the 2000 census, its population was 356. It covers an area of 36.18 square miles (93.7 km^{2}), containing one incorporated settlement, Aspinwall, and one burial ground, Iowa Township Cemetery.
