= Pilot Township, Cherokee County, Iowa =

Township in Iowa, US

Pilot Township
- Township
- Coordinates: 42°41′24″N 095°33′52″W
- Country: United States
- State: Iowa
- County: Cherokee

Area
  - Total: 35.90 sq mi (92.98 km^{2})
  - Land: 35.88 sq mi (92.94 km^{2})
  - Water: 0.015 sq mi (0.04 km^{2})
- Elevation: 1,158 ft (353 m)

Population (2000)
  - Total: 303
  - Density: 8.5/sq mi (3.3/km^{2})
- FIPS code: 19-93321
- GNIS feature ID: 0468515

Pilot Township is one of sixteen townships in Cherokee County, Iowa, United States. As of the 2000 census, its population was 303.

== Geography ==
Pilot Township covers an area of 35.9 square miles (93 km^{2}) and contains no incorporated settlements. According to the USGS, it contains two cemeteries: Good Hope and West Point.
