= Rogersville, Iowa =

- Unincorporated community
- Location within Iowa
- Coordinates: 42°06′31″N 92°13′54″W
- Country: United States
- State: Iowa
- County: Benton
- Elevation: 948 ft (289 m)
- Time zone: UTC-6 (Central (CST))
  - Summer (DST): UTC-5 (CDT)
- Area code: 319
- GNIS feature ID: 464183

Rogersville is an unincorporated community in Benton County, Iowa, United States.

== History ==
A post office was established in Rogersville (also spelled Rogerville) in 1893, and remained in operation until it was discontinued in 1897. Rogerville's population was 26 in 1902.
