= Grant Township, Sioux County, Iowa =

Township in Iowa, USA

Coordinates: 43°13′N 95°55′W

Grant Township is a township in Sioux County, Iowa, USA.
