= Douglas Township, Clay County, Iowa =

Township in Iowa, US

Douglas Township
- Township
- Location in Clay County
- Coordinates: 42°57′14″N 095°12′44″W
- Country: United States
- State: Iowa
- County: Clay

Area
  - Total: 35.7 sq mi (92.4 km^{2})
  - Land: 35.67 sq mi (92.39 km^{2})
  - Water: 0.0039 sq mi (0.01 km^{2}) 0.01%
- Elevation: 1,375 ft (419 m)

Population (2010)
  - Total: 168
  - Density: 4.7/sq mi (1.8/km^{2})
- GNIS feature ID: 0467727

Douglas Township is a township in Clay County, Iowa, USA. As of the 2010 United States census, its population was 168.

== History ==
Douglas Township was created in 1860.

In the 2000 United States census, Douglas had a total population of 212, bearing 162 adults 7 non-white residents.

== Geography ==
Douglas Township covers an area of 35.68 square miles (92.4 km^{2}) and contains no incorporated settlements. According to the USGS, it contains three cemeteries: Douglas Township, Fanny Fern and Zion.
