= Pitcher Township, Cherokee County, Iowa =

Township in Iowa, US

Pitcher Township
- Township
- Coordinates: 42°41′45″N 095°26′31″W
- Country: United States
- State: Iowa
- County: Cherokee

Area
  - Total: 35.8 sq mi (92.7 km^{2})
  - Land: 35.79 sq mi (92.69 km^{2})
  - Water: 0.0039 sq mi (0.01 km^{2})
- Elevation: 1,368 ft (417 m)

Population (2000)
  - Total: 1,292
  - Density: 36/sq mi (13.9/km^{2})
- FIPS code: 19-93336
- GNIS feature ID: 0468520

Pitcher Township is one of sixteen townships in Cherokee County, Iowa, United States. As of the 2000 census, its population was 1,292.

== Geography ==
Pitcher Township covers an area of 35.79 square miles (92.7 km^{2}) and contains one incorporated settlement, Aurelia. According to the USGS, it contains one cemetery, Pleasant Hill.

Historical maps of Pitcher Township from 1923 and 1907 can be found on Historic Map Works.
