= Peterson Township, Clay County, Iowa =

Township in Iowa, US

Peterson Township
- Township
- Location in Clay County
- Coordinates: 42°57′17″N 095°19′45″W
- Country: United States
- State: Iowa
- County: Clay

Area
  - Total: 35.75 sq mi (92.58 km^{2})
  - Land: 35.75 sq mi (92.58 km^{2})
  - Water: 0 sq mi (0 km^{2}) 0%
- Elevation: 1,410 ft (430 m)

Population (2000)
  - Total: 555
  - Density: 16/sq mi (6/km^{2})
- GNIS feature ID: 0468512

Peterson Township is a township in Clay County, Iowa, USA. As of the 2000 census, its population was 555.

== History ==
Peterson Township was created in 1878.

== Geography ==
Peterson Township covers an area of 35.75 square miles (92.6 km^{2}) and contains one incorporated settlement, Peterson. According to the USGS, it contains one cemetery, Oakland.
