= Diamond Township, Cherokee County, Iowa =

Township in Iowa, US

Diamond Township
- Township
- Coordinates: 42°36′04″N 095°26′40″W
- Country: United States
- State: Iowa
- County: Cherokee

Area
  - Total: 35.68 sq mi (92.41 km^{2})
  - Land: 35.66 sq mi (92.36 km^{2})
  - Water: 0.019 sq mi (0.05 km^{2})
- Elevation: 1,339 ft (408 m)

Population (2000)
  - Total: 215
  - Density: 6.0/sq mi (2.3/km^{2})
- FIPS code: 19-90996
- GNIS feature ID: 0467714

Diamond Township is one of sixteen townships in Cherokee County, Iowa, United States. As of the 2000 census, its population was 215.

== Geography ==
Diamond Township covers an area of 35.68 square miles (92.4 km^{2}) and contains no incorporated settlements. According to the USGS, it contains one cemetery, Diamond.
