= Logan Township, Clay County, Iowa =

Township in Iowa, US

Logan Township
- Township
- Location in Clay County
- Coordinates: 43°02′55″N 094°58′29″W
- Country: United States
- State: Iowa
- County: Clay

Area
  - Total: 36.51 sq mi (94.57 km^{2})
  - Land: 36.30 sq mi (94.01 km^{2})
  - Water: 0.22 sq mi (0.56 km^{2}) 0.59%
- Elevation: 1,398 ft (426 m)

Population (2000)
  - Total: 166
  - Density: 4.7/sq mi (1.8/km^{2})
- GNIS feature ID: 0468296

Logan Township is a township in Clay County, Iowa, USA. As of the 2000 census, its population was 166.

== History ==
Logan Township was created in 1882.

== Geography ==
Logan Township covers an area of 36.51 square miles (94.6 km^{2}) and contains no incorporated settlements. According to the USGS, it contains one cemetery, Logan Township.

Elk Lake is within this township.
