= Floyd Township, Sioux County, Iowa =

Township in Sioux County, Iowa, U.S.

Coordinates: 43°02′N 95°55′W

Floyd Township is a township in Sioux County, in northwestern Iowa, United States. The 2020 Decennial Census reported that it had a population of 1,110 persons in 446 households.

The Floyd River, Iowa Highway 60 and Vande Weerd Pit, an 18-acre park, are within or adjacent to the township.

Historical accounts indicate that settlers were living in what later became Floyd Township as early as 1870. The township itself was organized in 1874, consisting of land that had previously been eastern Holland Township. Early pioneers of Floyd Township included the Boersma, Draayom, Dyke, and Van Rooyen families.
