= Cedar Township, Cherokee County, Iowa =

Township in Iowa, US

Cedar Township
- Township
- Coordinates: 42°51′58″N 095°33′45″W
- Country: United States
- State: Iowa
- County: Cherokee

Area
  - Total: 36.24 sq mi (93.86 km^{2})
  - Land: 36.24 sq mi (93.86 km^{2})
  - Water: 0 sq mi (0 km^{2})
- Elevation: 1,368 ft (417 m)

Population (2000)
  - Total: 405
  - Density: 11/sq mi (4.3/km^{2})
- FIPS code: 19-90531
- GNIS feature ID: 0467551

Cedar Township is one of sixteen townships in Cherokee County, Iowa, United States. As of the 2000 census, its population was 405.

== Geography ==
Cedar Township covers an area of 36.24 square miles (93.9 km^{2}) and contains one incorporated settlement, Larrabee. According to the USGS, it contains one cemetery, Cedar.
