= Lincoln Township, Union County, Iowa =

Township in Iowa, U.S.

Coordinates: 41°06′51″N 94°17′57″W

Lincoln Township is a township in Union County, Iowa, United States.
