= Woodbury County, Iowa =

County in Iowa, United States

- County
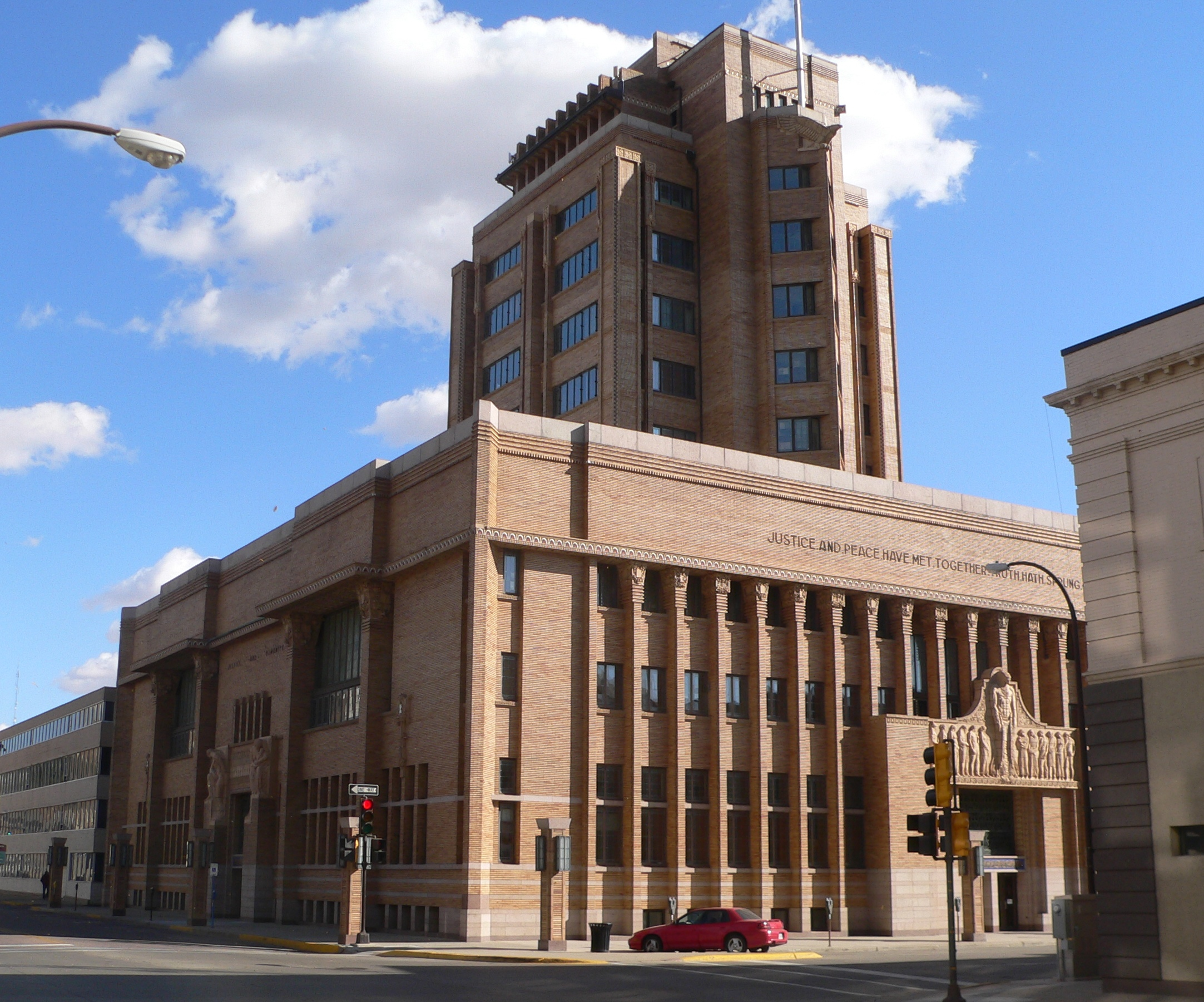
- The Woodbury County Courthouse in Sioux City

- Seal

- Location within the U.S. state of Iowa
- Coordinates: 42.393220°N 96.053296°W
- Country: United States
- State: Iowa
- Created: January 15, 1851
- Organized: March 7, 1853
- Named for: Levi Woodbury
- Seat: Sioux City
- Largest city: Sioux City

Area
  - Total: 877.836 sq mi (2,273.58 km^{2})
  - Land: 872.896 sq mi (2,260.79 km^{2})
  - Water: 4.940 sq mi (12.79 km^{2}) 0.56%

Population (2020)
  - Total: 105,941
  - Estimate (2025): 106,649 ▲
  - Density: 121.367/sq mi (46.8602/km^{2})
- Time zone: UTC−6 (Central)
  - Summer (DST): UTC−5 (CDT)
- Area code: 712
- Congressional district: 4th
- Website: woodburycountyiowa.gov
- Iowa county number 97

Woodbury County is a county located in the U.S. state of Iowa. As of the 2020 census, the population was 105,941, and was estimated to be 106,649 in 2025, making it the seventh-most populous county in Iowa. The county seat and the largest city is Sioux City.

Woodbury County is included in the Sioux City metropolitan area.

== History ==
Originally established in 1851 as Wahkaw County, the Iowa Legislature in 1853 changed the name to Woodbury County in honor of Levi Woodbury (1789–1851), a senator and governor of New Hampshire who served as a Supreme Court justice from 1844 until his death.

The first county seat of Wahkaw County was the now-extinct village of Thompsonville; when the Legislature changed the county name to Woodbury, the new county seat became Sergeant's Bluff (now Sergeant Bluff). The county seat was moved to Sioux City in 1856.

The Winnebago Tribe of Nebraska (Ho-Chunk) owns reservation land in Woodbury County.

== Geography ==
The county is on the western edge of Iowa, with its western border being the Missouri River.

According to the United States Census Bureau, the county has a total area of 877.836 square miles (2,273.58 km^{2}), of which 872.896 square miles (2,260.79 km^{2}) is land and 4.940 square miles (12.79 km^{2}) (0.56%) is water. It is the third-largest county in Iowa by total area.

=== Major highways ===
- Interstate 29
- Interstate 129
- U.S. Highway 20
- U.S. Highway 75
- U.S. Highway 77
- Iowa Highway 12
- Iowa Highway 31
- Iowa Highway 140
- Iowa Highway 141
- Iowa Highway 175

=== Transit ===
- Sioux City Transit

=== Adjacent counties ===
- Plymouth County (north)
- Cherokee County (northeast)
- Ida County (east)
- Monona County (south)
- Thurston County, Nebraska (southwest)
- Dakota County, Nebraska (west)
- Union County, South Dakota (northwest)

== Demographics ==
Historical population
Census	Pop.	Note	%±
1860	1,119		—
1870	6,172		451.6%
1880	14,996		143.0%
1890	55,632		271.0%
1900	54,610		−1.8%
1910	67,616		23.8%
1920	92,171		36.3%
1930	101,669		10.3%
1940	103,627		1.9%
1950	103,917		0.3%
1960	107,849		3.8%
1970	103,052		−4.4%
1980	100,884		−2.1%
1990	98,276		−2.6%
2000	103,877		5.7%
2010	102,172		−1.6%
2020	105,941		3.7%
2025 (est.)	106,649	▲	0.7%
U.S. Decennial Census; 1790–1960 1900–1990; 1990–2000 2010–2020

As of the third quarter of 2025, the median home value in Woodbury County was $201,273.

As of the 2024 American Community Survey, there are 40,764 estimated households in Woodbury County with an average of 2.56 persons per household. The county has a median household income of $78,923. Approximately 13.7% of the county's population lives at or below the poverty line. Woodbury County has an estimated 66.0% employment rate, with 27.5% of the population holding a bachelor's degree or higher and 87.8% holding a high school diploma. There were 43,701 housing units at an average density of 50.06 per square mile (19.3/km^{2}).

The median age in the county was 35.2 years.

Woodbury County, Iowa – racial and ethnic composition Note: the US Census treats Hispanic/Latino as an ethnic category. This table excludes Latinos from the racial categories and assigns them to a separate category. Hispanics/Latinos may be of any race.
Race / ethnicity (NH = non-Hispanic)	Pop. 1980	Pop. 1990	Pop. 2000	Pop. 2010	Pop. 2020
White alone (NH)	97,036 (96.19%)	90,943 (92.54%)	86,821 (83.58%)	79,282 (77.60%)	72,237 (68.19%)
Black or African American alone (NH)	1,106 (1.10%)	1,836 (1.87%)	2,013 (1.94%)	2,384 (2.33%)	5,076 (4.79%)
Native American or Alaska Native alone (NH)	1,169 (1.16%)	1,478 (1.50%)	1,529 (1.47%)	1,789 (1.75%)	1,893 (1.79%)
Asian alone (NH)	314 (0.31%)	1,236 (1.26%)	2,490 (2.40%)	2,395 (2.34%)	2,957 (2.79%)
Pacific Islander alone (NH)	—	—	30 (0.03%)	102 (0.10%)	651 (0.61%)
Other race alone (NH)	114 (0.11%)	71 (0.07%)	72 (0.07%)	60 (0.06%)	358 (0.34%)
Mixed race or multiracial (NH)	—	—	1,454 (1.40%)	2,167 (2.12%)	4,023 (3.80%)
Hispanic or Latino (any race)	1,145 (1.13%)	2,712 (2.76%)	9,468 (9.11%)	13,993 (13.70%)	18,746 (17.69%)
Total	100,884 (100.00%)	98,276 (100.00%)	103,877 (100.00%)	102,172 (100.00%)	105,941 (100.00%)

=== 2024 estimate ===
As of the 2024 estimate, there were 107,257 people, 40,764 households, and _ families residing in the county. The population density was 122.87 inhabitants per square mile (47.4/km^{2}). There were 43,701 housing units at an average density of 50.06 per square mile (19.3/km^{2}). The racial makeup of the county was 83.3% White (65.8% NH White), 6.1% African American, 3.3% Native American, 3.1% Asian, 1.0% Pacific Islander, _% from some other races and 3.1% from two or more races. Hispanic or Latino people of any race were 20.5% of the population.

=== 2020 census ===
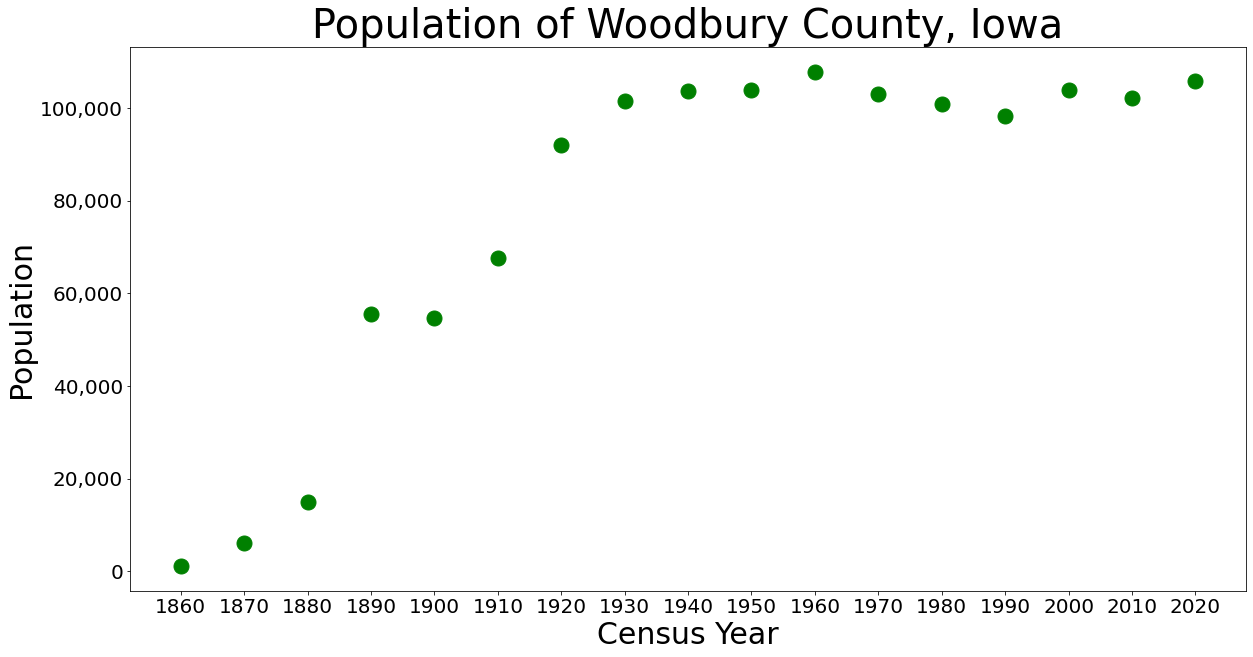
Population of Woodbury County from the U.S. census data

As of the 2020 census, there were 105,941 people, 39,904 households, and 25,784 families residing in the county. The population density was 121.37 inhabitants per square mile (46.9/km^{2}). There were 42,701 housing units at an average density of 48.92 per square mile (18.9/km^{2}). The racial makeup of the county was 72.49% White, 4.91% African American, 2.37% Native American, 2.84% Asian, 0.62% Pacific Islander, 7.70% from some other races and 9.07% from two or more races. Hispanic or Latino people of any race were % of the population.

The median age was 35.8 years; 26.0% of residents were under the age of 18 and 15.4% of residents were 65 years of age or older. For every 100 females there were 99.2 males, and for every 100 females age 18 and over there were 97.5 males age 18 and over.

83.9% of residents lived in urban areas, while 16.1% lived in rural areas.

There were 39,904 households, of which 32.9% had children under the age of 18 living in them. Of all households, 44.7% were married-couple households, 20.2% were households with a male householder and no spouse or partner present, and 26.9% were households with a female householder and no spouse or partner present. About 28.8% of all households were made up of individuals and 11.9% had someone living alone who was 65 years of age or older.

Among the 42,701 housing units, 6.6% were vacant. Of the occupied units, 64.9% were owner-occupied and 35.1% were renter-occupied. The homeowner vacancy rate was 1.3% and the rental vacancy rate was 7.6%.

=== 2010 census ===
As of the 2010 census, there were 102,172 people, 39,052 households, and _ families residing in the county. The population density was 117.05 inhabitants per square mile (45.2/km^{2}). There were 41,484 housing units at an average density of 47.52 per square mile (18.3/km^{2}). The racial makeup of the county was 83.57% White, 2.40% African American, 2.21% Native American, 2.37% Asian, 0.10% Pacific Islander, 6.11% from some other races and 3.24% from two or more races. Hispanic or Latino people of any race were % of the population.

=== 2000 census ===
As of the 2000 census, there were 103,877 people, 39,151 households, and 26,426 families residing in the county. The population density was 119.00 inhabitants per square mile (45.9/km^{2}). There were 41,394 housing units at an average density of 47.42 per square mile (18.3/km^{2}). The racial makeup of the county was 87.48% White, 2.02% African American, 1.69% Native American, 2.41% Asian, 0.04% Pacific Islander, 4.37% from some other races and 1.99% from two or more races. Hispanic or Latino people of any race were 9.11% of the population.

There were 39,151 households, 34.00% had children under the age of 18 living with them, 51.90% were married couples living together, 11.30% had a female householder with no husband present, and 32.50% were non-families. 26.60% of households were one person and 11.20% were one person aged 65 or older. The average household size was 2.58 and the average family size was 3.13.

The age distribution was 27.30% under the age of 18, 10.20% from 18 to 24, 28.30% from 25 to 44, 20.80% from 45 to 64, and 13.40% 65 or older. The median age was 34 years. For every 100 females, there were 96.10 males. For every 100 females age 18 and over, there were 92.80 males.

The median household income was $38,509 and the median family income was $46,499. Males had a median income of $31,664 versus $22,599 for females. The per capita income for the county was $18,771. About 7.20% of families and 10.30% of the population were below the poverty line, including 13.60% of those under age 18 and 7.40% of those age 65 or over.

== Politics ==
For much of the second half of the 20th century, Woodbury County tilted Republican, albeit not as overwhelmingly as most of western Iowa. Between 1988 and 2012 Woodbury County was the quintessential swing county in Iowa. No candidate won it by more than 3.5% over that quarter-century. This was the only county in Iowa that Barack Obama won in 2012 that he failed to carry in 2008. However, in 2016, Woodbury County, like Iowa as a whole, swung over dramatically to Donald Trump, who carried it by a 19 percent margin, the largest margin of victory since Lyndon Johnson's landslide election in 1964.

United States presidential election results for Woodbury County, Iowa
Year	Republican		Democratic		Third party(ies)	
Year	No.	%	No.	%	No.	%
1880	1,453	56.25%	995	38.52%	135	5.23%
1884	2,789	53.78%	2,380	45.89%	17	0.33%
1888	4,169	52.87%	3,588	45.50%	129	1.64%
1892	4,620	47.07%	4,156	42.34%	1,040	10.59%
1896	6,204	54.86%	4,876	43.12%	229	2.02%
1900	7,045	57.54%	4,796	39.17%	402	3.28%
1904	7,597	66.85%	2,809	24.72%	958	8.43%
1908	6,587	53.52%	5,222	42.43%	498	4.05%
1912	2,441	18.66%	4,564	34.89%	6,077	46.45%
1916	5,735	38.61%	8,819	59.38%	299	2.01%
1920	17,603	62.07%	9,815	34.61%	944	3.33%
1924	16,639	47.38%	5,676	16.16%	12,804	36.46%
1928	20,587	54.78%	16,831	44.78%	166	0.44%
1932	12,764	31.97%	26,397	66.12%	761	1.91%
1936	14,157	32.92%	26,847	62.43%	1,998	4.65%
1940	22,832	48.19%	24,457	51.62%	89	0.19%
1944	18,544	47.43%	20,448	52.30%	104	0.27%
1948	16,655	42.61%	22,056	56.43%	373	0.95%
1952	27,518	58.36%	19,474	41.30%	159	0.34%
1956	25,399	55.89%	19,997	44.00%	49	0.11%
1960	26,832	55.05%	21,906	44.94%	6	0.01%
1964	17,347	39.23%	26,841	60.70%	30	0.07%
1968	21,159	50.62%	18,281	43.73%	2,363	5.65%
1972	23,757	57.34%	16,974	40.97%	699	1.69%
1976	22,853	52.79%	19,664	45.43%	770	1.78%
1980	23,553	54.43%	15,930	36.81%	3,792	8.76%
1984	23,002	54.31%	18,951	44.75%	397	0.94%
1988	18,790	47.90%	20,153	51.38%	282	0.72%
1992	18,148	42.34%	17,398	40.59%	7,318	17.07%
1996	16,368	43.69%	17,224	45.97%	3,872	10.34%
2000	18,864	49.78%	17,691	46.68%	1,341	3.54%
2004	22,451	50.80%	21,455	48.55%	289	0.65%
2008	22,219	49.58%	21,983	49.05%	613	1.37%
2012	21,841	48.52%	22,302	49.54%	876	1.95%
2016	24,727	56.56%	16,210	37.08%	2,781	6.36%
2020	25,736	56.73%	18,704	41.23%	922	2.03%
2024	25,969	60.50%	16,145	37.62%	807	1.88%

== Communities ==
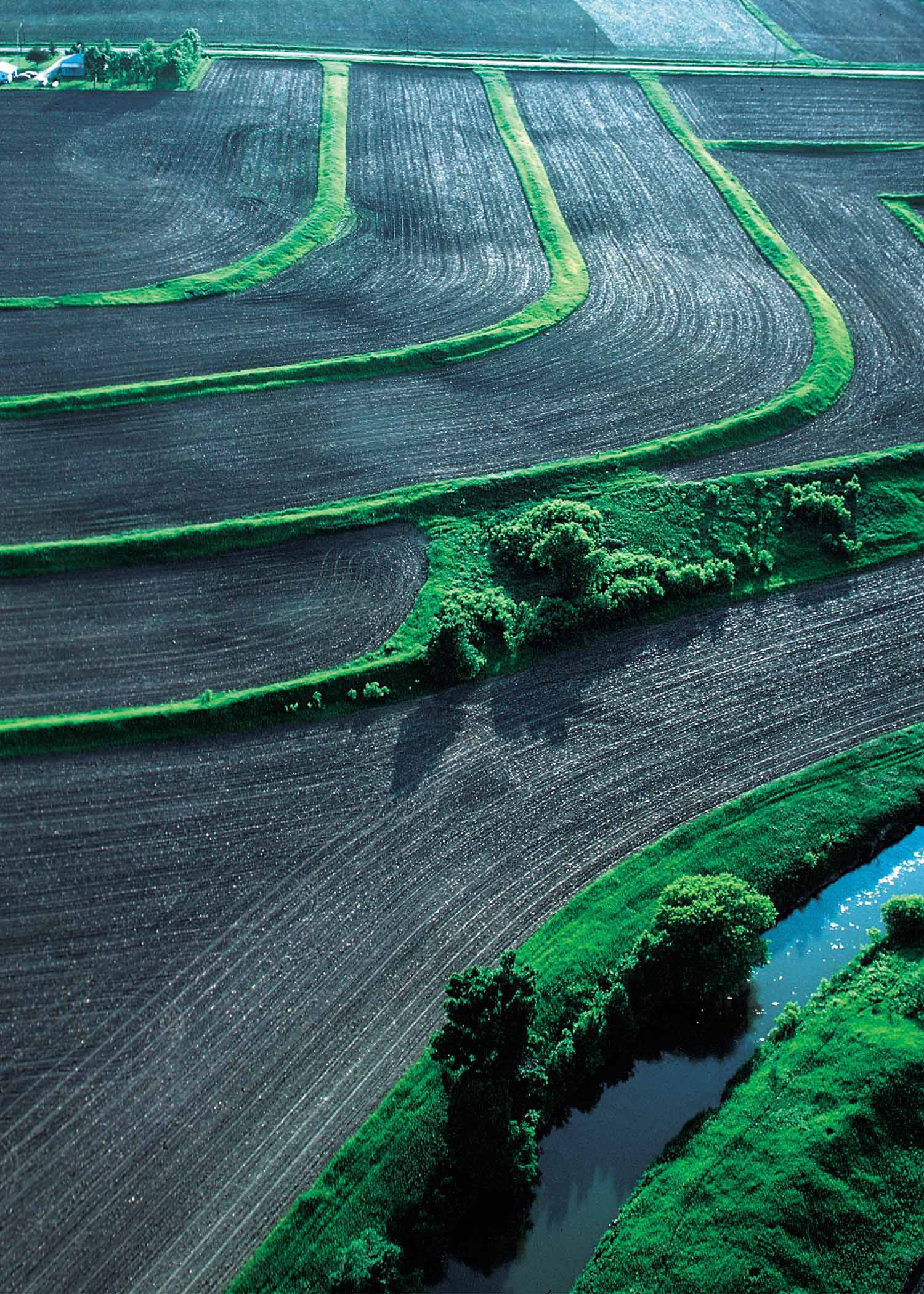
Terraces, conservation tillage and buffers save soil and improve water quality on this Woodbury County farm in 1999.

=== Cities ===
- Anthon
- Bronson
- Correctionville
- Cushing
- Danbury
- Hornick
- Lawton
- Moville
- Oto
- Pierson
- Salix
- Sergeant Bluff
- Sioux City
- Sloan
- Smithland

=== Unincorporated communities ===
- Climbing Hill (a census-designated place)
- Discord
- Dodds
- German City
- Grange
- Holly Springs
- Lozier
- Lucky Valley
- Luton
- Midway
- Owego
- Peiro
- Rock Branch
- Snyder Grove
- Wolfdale

=== Townships ===
- Arlington
- Banner
- Concord
- Floyd
- Grange
- Grant
- Kedron
- Lakeport
- Liberty
- Liston
- Little Sioux
- Miller
- Morgan
- Moville
- Oto
- Rock
- Rutland
- Sioux City
- Sloan
- Union
- West Fork
- Willow
- Wolf Creek
- Woodbury

=== Population ranking ===
The population ranking of the following table is based on the 2020 census of Woodbury County.

† county seat

Rank	City/Town/etc.	Municipal type	Population (2020 Census)	Population (2024 Estimate)
1	† Sioux City (partially in Plymouth County)	City	85,791 (85,797 total)	86,869 (86,875 total)
2	Sergeant Bluff	City	5,015	5,335
3	Moville	City	1,687	1,707
4	Sloan	City	1,042	1,078
5	Lawton	City	943	949
6	Correctionville	City	766	759
7	Anthon	City	545	534
8	Pierson	City	337	335
9	Danbury	City	320	315
10	Salix	City	295	303
11	Bronson	City	294	294
12	Hornick	City	255	255
13	Cushing	City	230	225
14	Smithland	City	181	184
15	Climbing Hill	CDP	97	110
16	Oto	City	72	65

== Education ==
School districts include:

- Kingsley–Pierson Community School District, Kingsley
- Lawton–Bronson Community School District, Lawton- Formed on July 1, 1966.
- Maple Valley-Anthon Oto Community School District, Mapleton - Formed on July 1, 2012.
- Odebolt–Arthur–Battle Creek–Ida Grove Community School District, Ida Grove - Formed on July 1, 2018.
- River Valley Community School District, Correctionville - Formed on July 1, 1996.
- Sergeant Bluff-Luton Community School District, Sergeant Bluff
- Sioux City Community School District, Sioux City
- Westwood Community School District, Sloan
- Woodbury Central Community School District, Moville

Former school districts include:

- Anthon–Oto Community School District - Merged into Maple Valley-Anthon Oto on July 1, 2012.
- Battle Creek–Ida Grove Community School District - Merged into OABCIG on July 1, 2018.
- Maple Valley Community School District - Merged into Maple Valley-Anthon Oto on July 1, 2012.

== See also ==
- National Register of Historic Places listings in Woodbury County, Iowa
