= Little Sioux Township, Woodbury County, Iowa =

Township in Iowa, USA

Coordinates: 42°15′N 95°58′W

Little Sioux Township is a township in Woodbury County, Iowa, United States.
