= Oneida Township, Tama County, Iowa =

Township in Tama County, Iowa, U.S.

Coordinates: 42°04′47″N 92°21′27″W

Location of Oneida Township in Tama County

Oneida Township is one of the twenty-one townships of Tama County, Iowa, United States.

== History ==
Oneida Township was organized in 1860.
