= Sloan Township, Woodbury County, Iowa =

Township in Woodbury County, Iowa, U.S.

Coordinates: 42.2324°N 96.2257°W

Sloan Township is a township in Woodbury County, Iowa, United States.

== History ==
Sloan Township was organized in 1876.
