= Rock Township, Woodbury County, Iowa =

Township in Iowa, USA

Coordinates: 42°26′N 95°44′W

Rock Township is a township in Woodbury County, Iowa, United States.
