= York Township, Tama County, Iowa =

Township in Tama County, Iowa, U.S.

Coordinates: 41°59′33″N 92°21′24″W

York Township is one of the twenty-one townships of Tama County, Iowa, United States.

== History ==
York Township was organized in 1856. It was named after York, New York.
