= Oto Township, Woodbury County, Iowa =

Township in Iowa, USA

Coordinates: 42.2546°N 95.8467°W

Oto Township is a township in Woodbury County, Iowa, United States.
