= Anthon, Iowa =

- City
- Location of Anthon, Iowa
- Coordinates: 42°23′17″N 95°51′56″W
- Country: USA
- State: Iowa
- County: Woodbury

Area
  - Total: 0.71 sq mi (1.83 km^{2})
  - Land: 0.71 sq mi (1.83 km^{2})
  - Water: 0 sq mi (0.00 km^{2})
- Elevation: 1,119 ft (341 m)

Population (2020)
  - Total: 545
  - Density: 772.5/sq mi (298.27/km^{2})
- Time zone: UTC-6 (Central (CST))
  - Summer (DST): UTC-5 (CDT)
- ZIP code: 51004
- Area code: 712
- FIPS code: 19-02350
- GNIS feature ID: 2393965
- Website: cityofanthon.com

Anthon is a city in Woodbury County, Iowa, United States. It is part of the Sioux City, IA–NE–SD Metropolitan Statistical Area. The population was 545 at the 2020 census.

Anthon was home to Charles Osborne, who had the hiccups continuously for 68 years, and was featured in the Guinness Book of World Records. It was also home to eunuchoidal giant Bernard Coyne, who was over 8 feet (243 cm) tall.

Anthon was named for J. C. Anthon, a railroad engineer. It was founded in 1888.

== Geography ==
According to the United States Census Bureau, the city has a total area of 0.71 square miles (1.84 km^{2}), all land. The town is situated near the Little Sioux River.

== Demographics ==
Historical populations
Year	Pop.	±%
1900	437	—
1910	635	+45.3%
1920	783	+23.3%
1930	826	+5.5%
1940	881	+6.7%
1950	770	−12.6%
1960	681	−11.6%
1970	711	+4.4%
1980	687	−3.4%
1990	638	−7.1%
2000	649	+1.7%
2010	565	−12.9%
2020	545	−3.5%
Source:"U.S. Census website". United States Census Bureau. and Iowa Data Center; Source: U.S. Decennial Census

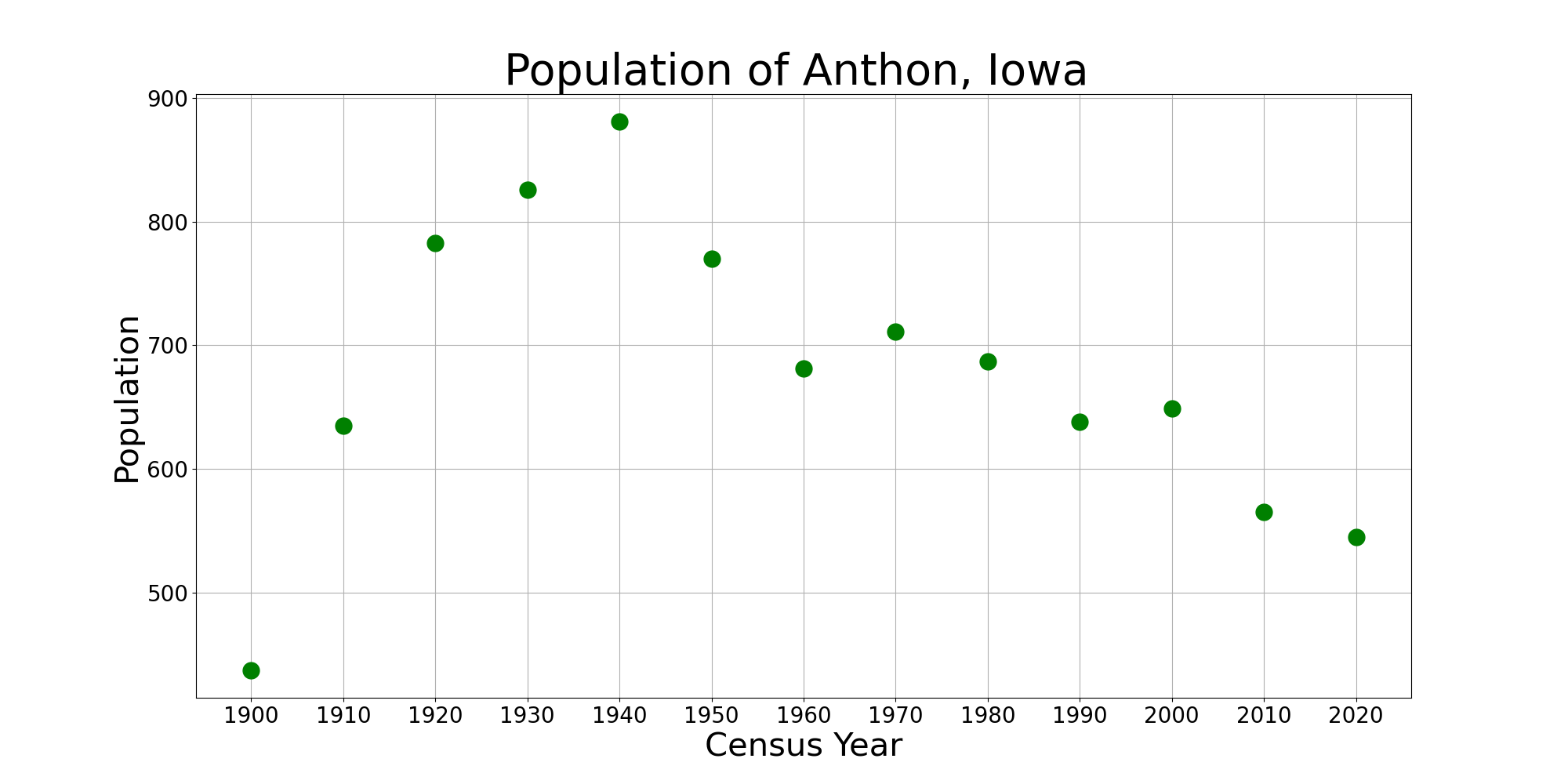
The population of Anthon, Iowa from US census data

=== 2020 census ===
As of the census of 2020, there were 545 people, 252 households, and 153 families residing in the city. The population density was 772.5 inhabitants per square mile (298.3/km^{2}). There were 280 housing units at an average density of 396.9 per square mile (153.2/km^{2}). The racial makeup of the city was 94.7% White, 0.6% Black or African American, 0.7% Native American, 0.2% Asian, 0.2% Pacific Islander, 1.3% from other races and 2.4% from two or more races. Hispanic or Latino persons of any race comprised 3.5% of the population.

Of the 252 households, 25.8% of which had children under the age of 18 living with them, 40.9% were married couples living together, 6.7% were cohabitating couples, 29.8% had a female householder with no spouse or partner present and 22.6% had a male householder with no spouse or partner present. 39.3% of all households were non-families. 33.3% of all households were made up of individuals, 15.5% had someone living alone who was 65 years old or older.

The median age in the city was 43.1 years. 24.2% of the residents were under the age of 20; 5.0% were between the ages of 20 and 24; 23.9% were from 25 and 44; 25.3% were from 45 and 64; and 21.7% were 65 years of age or older. The gender makeup of the city was 48.6% male and 51.4% female.

=== 2010 census ===
As of the census of 2010, there were 565 people, 263 households, and 152 families residing in the city. The population density was 795.8 inhabitants per square mile (307.3/km^{2}). There were 295 housing units at an average density of 415.5 per square mile (160.4/km^{2}). The racial makeup of the city was 97.2% White, 0.2% Native American, 1.4% from other races, and 1.2% from two or more races. Hispanic or Latino of any race were 2.5% of the population.

There were 263 households, of which 25.5% had children under the age of 18 living with them, 46.8% were married couples living together, 8.4% had a female householder with no husband present, 2.7% had a male householder with no wife present, and 42.2% were non-families. 38.4% of all households were made up of individuals, and 23.6% had someone living alone who was 65 years of age or older. The average household size was 2.15 and the average family size was 2.84.

The median age in the city was 46.8 years. 22.3% of residents were under the age of 18; 6% were between the ages of 18 and 24; 18% were from 25 to 44; 26.5% were from 45 to 64; and 27.1% were 65 years of age or older. The gender makeup of the city was 44.8% male and 55.2% female.

=== 2000 census ===
As of the census of 2000, there were 649 people, 291 households, and 176 families residing in the city. The population density was 909.7 inhabitants per square mile (351.2/km^{2}). There were 310 housing units at an average density of 434.5 per square mile (167.8/km^{2}). The racial makeup of the city was 99.38% White, 0.31% from other races, and 0.31% from two or more races. Hispanic or Latino of any race were 1.69% of the population.

There were 291 households, out of which 25.8% had children under the age of 18 living with them, 49.1% were married couples living together, 7.2% had a female householder with no husband present, and 39.5% were non-families. 37.1% of all households were made up of individuals, and 24.1% had someone living alone who was 65 years of age or older. The average household size was 2.23 and the average family size was 2.95.

24.8% were under the age of 18, 5.9% from 18 to 24, 22.5% from 25 to 44, 20.5% from 45 to 64, and 26.3% were 65 years of age or older. The median age was 42 years. For every 100 females, there were 82.8 males. For every 100 females age 18 and over, there were 81.4 males.

The median income for a household in the city was $26,364, and the median income for a family was $36,667. Males had a median income of $29,063 versus $19,853 for females. The per capita income for the city was $19,228. About 4.8% of families and 6.9% of the population were below the poverty line, including 2.7% of those under age 18 and 9.4% of those age 65 or over.

== Schools ==
School	Location	Mascot	Colors	Years
Maple Valley–Anthon–Oto	Mapleton	Rams		1994–present
Anthon–Oto	Anthon	Hawks		1959–1994
Anthon	Anthon	Bombers		?–1959

The city is served by the Maple Valley–Anthon–Oto Community School District.

The first school in Anthon was the Fox School, which stood from 1888 to 1890; it was replaced by the Anthon School, which was built in 1890 and 1891 and closed in 1918. A replacement brick building opened in 1918. Anthon won the 1949 Fall Baseball State title. The Anthon and Oto school districts consolidated in 1959 to form the Anthon–Oto Community School District. The Anthon–Oto district began grade-sharing with the Maple Valley Community School District circa 1993, and as part of that arrangement all high school students from both districts attended high school in Mapleton. On July 1, 2012, Anthon–Oto merged with Maple Valley to form the Maple Valley–Anthon–Oto district.
