= Moulton-Udell High School =

Public high school in Moulton, Iowa, United States

Location
- 305 8th Street; Moulton, Iowa 52572; United States; 40°41′21.06″N 92°40′26.81″W

Information
- Type: Public
- School district: Moulton-Udell Community School District
- Superintendent: Brian Vandersluis
- Principal: Shane Brown
- Teaching staff: 6.76 (FTE)
- Grades: 7-12
- Enrollment: 78 (2023-2024)
- Student to teacher ratio: 11.54
- Colors: Royal blue and white
- Athletics conference: Bluegrass
- Mascot: Eagle
- Website: www.moulton-udell.org

Moulton-Udell High School is an Appanoose County public school located in Moulton, Iowa, that serves pupils from grades seven through twelve. It became consolidated school serving the former Moulton High and Udell High in 1959. The school mascot is the Eagle.

== History ==
In 1869, the Christian Church housed Moulton's first public school, and the first high school building was later erected in the northeast part of town. In 1897 a three-story school was built, with a college on the third floor. Later came a gym, and classrooms were added to that building in 1938.

By the end of November 1956, discussions had begun to explore consolidation of Moulton and Udell schools. In 1959, the towns decided on Moulton as the location of the new consolidated school. After passage of a bond issue, the Moulton-Udell High School building was constructed in 1975. High school students from both towns moved into the new building, while younger students moved to the previous Moulton school building.

In 1999, a teacher was terminated from the school after helping an 11th grade class set up a secret cash account for their senior trip in violation of the school board rules on the allowable amount that could be raised for school trips.

Budget concerns were discussed in 2010, due to declining enrollment over the previous six years and state government funding cuts. The Des Moines Register reported, "In 1894, Iowa had 13,433 public schoolhouses, mostly one-room rural structures considered to be their own districts. That's been whittled down to 338 districts as of July; in the last decade alone, 29 schools have been shuttered."

In November 2019, a Moulton-Udell school bus driver attempted to make a left turn at the crest of a hill, pulling out in front of a pickup. One person was injured in the collision and taken to the hospital.

In May 2020, teachers at Moulton proposed the school board consider moving to a four-day week, Monday through Thursday with no school on Fridays. The proposal included extending daily class time approximately 50 minutes to comply with state law mandating class minimum time of 1,080 hours per school year. Advantages of the proposal included improved chances of recruiting and retaining new teachers, ongoing concerns in small districts, and increased family time for students. Parents raised concerns over increased child-care costs. By 2022, Moulton-Udell was one of four Iowa school districts on a four-day week.

Moulton-Udell has offered students annual career days, and has partnered with Indian Hills Community College in a "$1 million grant through new Career Academy Incentive Fund to prepare high school students for success in college, postsecondary training and the workforce". Career and technical programs offered in the Learn-to-earn Plan at Moulton-Udell include, "Agricultural, Food, and Natural Resources; Business, Finance, Marketing, and Management; Human Services; Health Science Technology".

== Alumni ==
Austin Harris - State Representative in Iowa

== Athletics ==
The Eagles compete in the Bluegrass Conference, including the following sports:

- Football (sharing agreement with Centerville)
- Volleyball
- Basketball (boys and girls)
- Wrestling (with Centerville, as Centerville-Moulton-Udell)
- Track and Field
- Baseball
- Softball
