= Walnut Township, Appanoose County, Iowa =

Township in Iowa, US

Walnut Township, Appanoose County
- Township
- Coordinates: 40°48′20″N 092°55′51″W
- Country: United States
- State: Iowa
- County: Appanoose

Area
  - Total: 30.89 sq mi (80.01 km^{2})
  - Land: 27.85 sq mi (72.14 km^{2})
  - Water: 3.04 sq mi (7.87 km^{2})
- Elevation: 988 ft (301 m)

Population (2010)
  - Total: 894
  - Density: 32/sq mi (12.4/km^{2})
- FIPS code: 19-94392
- GNIS feature ID: 0468882

Walnut Township is one of eighteen townships in Appanoose County, Iowa, United States. As of the 2010 census, its population was 894.

== Geography ==
Walnut Township covers an area of 30.9 square miles (80.0 km^{2}) and contains two incorporated settlements: Mystic and Rathbun. According to the USGS, it contains six cemeteries: Bohm, Elgin, Forbush, Highland, Shaeffer and Zimmer.
