= Udell =

Udell may refer to:

- Udell, Iowa
- Udell Township
- Florence Udell
- Jake Udell
- John Udell
- Jon Udell
- Randy Udell (born 1961), Wisconsin politician
