= Orleans, Appanoose County, Iowa =

Orleans, Iowa
- Unincorporated community
- Location within Iowa
- Coordinates: 40°43′32″N 92°39′27″W
- Country: United States
- State: Iowa
- County: Appanoose
- Elevation: 981 ft (299 m)
- Time zone: UTC-6 (Central (CST))
  - Summer (DST): UTC-5 (CDT)
- Area code: 641
- GNIS feature ID: 459896

Orleans is an unincorporated community in Appanoose County, Iowa, United States.

== History ==
Orleans was laid out in 1851. A post office was established in Orleans in 1860, and remained in operation until it was discontinued in 1887. The population was 123 in 1940.
