= Bellair Township, Appanoose County, Iowa =

Township in Iowa, US

Bellair Township, Appanoose County
- Township
- Coordinates: 40°43′26″N 092°56′29″W
- Country: United States
- State: Iowa
- County: Appanoose

Area
  - Total: 24.0 sq mi (62.2 km^{2})
  - Land: 24 sq mi (62 km^{2})
  - Water: 0.077 sq mi (0.2 km^{2})
- Elevation: 978 ft (298 m)

Population (2010)
  - Total: 554
  - Density: 23/sq mi (8.9/km^{2})
- FIPS code: 19-90177
- GNIS feature ID: 0467431

Bellair Township is one of eighteen townships in Appanoose County, Iowa, United States. As of the 2010 census, its population was 554.

== Geography ==
Bellair Township covers an area of 24.01 square miles (62.2 km^{2}) and contains one settlement, Numa. According to the USGS, it contains five cemeteries: Baker, County Farm, Felkner, Livengood and Numa.
