= Moulton-Udell Community School District =

School district in Iowa, United States

Coordinates: 40.688828°N 92.674109°W

Location
- Moulton, Iowa Appanoose and Davis counties United States
- Coordinates: 40.688828, -92.674109

District information
- Type: Public
- Grades: K–12
- Superintendent: Brian VanderSluis
- Schools: 2
- Budget: $3,522,000 (2020-21)
- NCES District ID: 1919800

Students and staff
- Students: 164 (2022-23)
- Teachers: 20.62 FTE
- Staff: 24.03 FTE
- Student–teacher ratio: 7.95
- Athletic conference: Bluegrass
- District mascot: Eagle
- Colors: Royal and White

Other information
- Website: www.moulton-udell.org

The Moulton-Udell Community School District is a public school district in Moulton, Iowa in the United States.

The district is mainly in eastern Appanoose County, with a smaller area in western Davis County. The district serves the towns of Moulton and Udell, and the surrounding rural areas.

Based on census data from 2024, the district as a popularion of 1,244, consists of 143.4 square miles, with 8.7 people per square mile.

The school's mascot is the Eagles. Their colors are royal and white.

== Schools ==
The district operates two schools on a single campus at 305 E. 8th in Moulton:

- Moulton-Udell Elementary School
- Moulton-Udell High School
