= Udell Township, Appanoose County, Iowa =

Township in Iowa, US

Udell Township, Appanoose County
- Township
- Coordinates: 40°48′21″N 092°41′25″W
- Country: United States
- State: Iowa
- County: Appanoose

Area
  - Total: 27.27 sq mi (70.62 km^{2})
  - Land: 26.83 sq mi (69.50 km^{2})
  - Water: 0.43 sq mi (1.12 km^{2})
- Elevation: 965 ft (294 m)

Population (2010)
  - Total: 343
  - Density: 13/sq mi (4.9/km^{2})
- FIPS code: 19-94155
- GNIS feature ID: 0468803

Udell Township is one of eighteen townships in Appanoose County, Iowa, United States. As of the 2010 census, its population was 343.

It was named for Dr. Nathan Udell, a pioneer settler.

== Geography ==
Udell Township covers an area of 27.3 square miles (70.6 km^{2}) and contains two incorporated settlements: Udell and Unionville, which together account for approximately half of the township's total population. According to the USGS, it contains five cemeteries: Clancy, Eaton, Fairview, Taylor and Unionville.
