= Johns Township, Appanoose County, Iowa =

Township in Iowa, US

Johns Township, Appanoose County
- Township
- Coordinates: 40°46′07″N 093°02′24″W
- Country: United States
- State: Iowa
- County: Appanoose

Area
  - Total: 36.25 sq mi (93.88 km^{2})
  - Land: 36.20 sq mi (93.75 km^{2})
  - Water: 0.050 sq mi (0.13 km^{2})
- Elevation: 1,030 ft (314 m)

Population (2010)
  - Total: 287
  - Density: 8.0/sq mi (3.1/km^{2})
- FIPS code: 19-92271
- GNIS feature ID: 0468152

Johns Township is one of eighteen townships in Appanoose County, Iowa, United States. As of the 2010 census, its population was 287.

The township's name was selected due to an unusually large percentage of early settlers sharing the name John.

== Geography ==
Johns Township covers an area of 36.25 square miles (93.88 km^{2}) and contains one incorporated settlement, Plano. According to the USGS, it contains five cemeteries: Concord, Crossroads, Garfield, Lyons and Philadelphia.
