= Moulton Junction, Iowa =

Railway junction in Iowa, United States

Moulton Junction

General information
- Location: Appanoose County, Iowa; United States
- Coordinates: 40.6754747°N 92.6800149°W
Location

Moulton Junction was a railroad junction in Appanoose County, Iowa where two railroads, Norfolk Southern Railway and the Chicago, Rock Island and Pacific Railroad (Rock Island), formerly met.
