= Sharon Township, Iowa =

Sharon Township, Iowa may refer to:

- Sharon Township, Appanoose County, Iowa
- Sharon Township, Audubon County, Iowa
- Sharon Township, Clinton County, Iowa
- Sharon Township, Johnson County, Iowa
