= Centerville Community School District (Iowa) =

Public school district in Centerville, Iowa, United States

Coordinates: 40.738587°N 92.874838°W

Location
- Centerville, Iowa Appanoose County United States
- Coordinates: 40.738587, -92.874838

District information
- Type: Local school district
- Grades: K-12
- Superintendent: Mark Taylor
- Schools: 4
- Budget: $20,323,000 (2020-21)
- NCES District ID: 1906750

Students and staff
- Students: 1357 (2022-23)
- Teachers: 91.96 FTE
- Staff: 105.98 FTE
- Student–teacher ratio: 14.76
- Athletic conference: South Central

Other information
- Website: www.centervilleschools.org

The Centerville Community School District is a public school district headquartered in Centerville, Iowa.

It serves areas in Appanoose County, including Centerville, Cincinnati, Exline, Mystic, the majority of Numa, Rathbun and the surrounding rural areas.

The school's athletic teams are the Reds and Redettes, their colors are Scarlet and Black, and they are in the South Central Conference.

Mark Taylor was hired as the interim superintendent in 2022.

== Schools ==
The district operates five schools, all in Centerville:

- Centerville Community Preschool
- Central Ward Elementary School
- Lakeview Elementary School
- Howar Middle School
- Centerville High School

== See also ==
- List of school districts in Iowa
