= Exline, Iowa =

- City
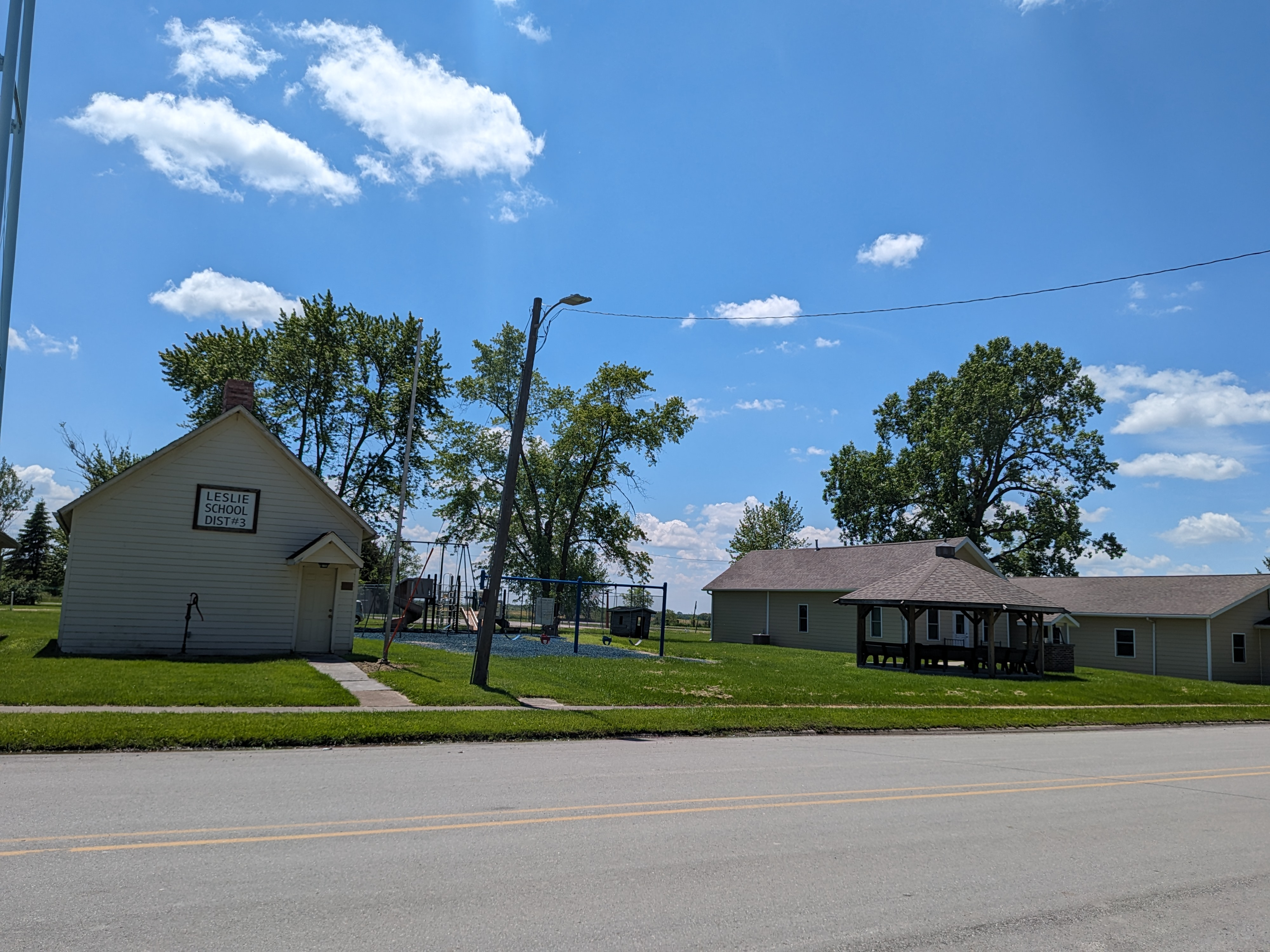
- "The Old School" (left) next to a public park in Exline

- Location of Exline, Iowa
- Coordinates: 40°38′57″N 92°50′35″W
- Country: US
- State: Iowa
- County: Appanoose
- Township: Caldwell
- Incorporated: June 20, 1904
- Named for: David Exline

Area
  - Total: 0.99 sq mi (2.57 km^{2})
  - Land: 0.99 sq mi (2.57 km^{2})
  - Water: 0 sq mi (0.00 km^{2})
- Elevation: 1,014 ft (309 m)

Population (2020)
  - Total: 160
  - Density: 161.1/sq mi (62.19/km^{2})
- Time zone: UTC-6 (Central (CST))
  - Summer (DST): UTC-5 (CDT)
- ZIP code: 52555
- Area code: 641
- FIPS code: 19-26310
- GNIS feature ID: 2394721

Exline is a city in Caldwell Township, Appanoose County, Iowa, United States. The population was 160 in the 2020 census, a decline from 191 in 2000.

== History ==
Exline was surveyed by J.J. Hall in 1873 for David Exline, who settled there and established a successful dry-goods business, and it was incorporated in 1904. Initially, the town was known as Caldwell City or Bob Town. The opening of a post office in 1877 forced the town to settle on an official name.

Exline grew considerably with the coal boom. United Mine Workers local 812 was organized in Exline in 1899; by 1907, it had 200 members. In 1912, Local 812 had 180 members. In 1906, Exline was home to the Exline Coal Company, with two mine shafts west of town, the Iowa Block Coal Company also had an Exline mine, the White Oak Coal Company had a mine north of town, and the inactive Royal Mine was to the east.

== Geography ==
According to the United States Census Bureau, the city has a total area of 0.99 square miles (2.56 km^{2}), all land.

Geologists have named the Exline cyclothem after the town. This rock group extends from Iowa into Illinois and contains the Exline limestone, named after the exposure on a creek bank, 1.5 miles south of the southwest corner of Exline.

== Demographics ==
Historical population
Census	Pop.	Note	%±
1880	34		—
1890	174		411.8%
1900	345		98.3%
1910	660		91.3%
1920	755		14.4%
1930	437		−42.1%
1940	481		10.1%
1950	342		−28.9%
1960	223		−34.8%
1970	224		0.4%
1980	217		−3.1%
1990	187		−13.8%
2000	191		2.1%
2010	160		−16.2%
2020	160		0.0%
U.S. Decennial Census

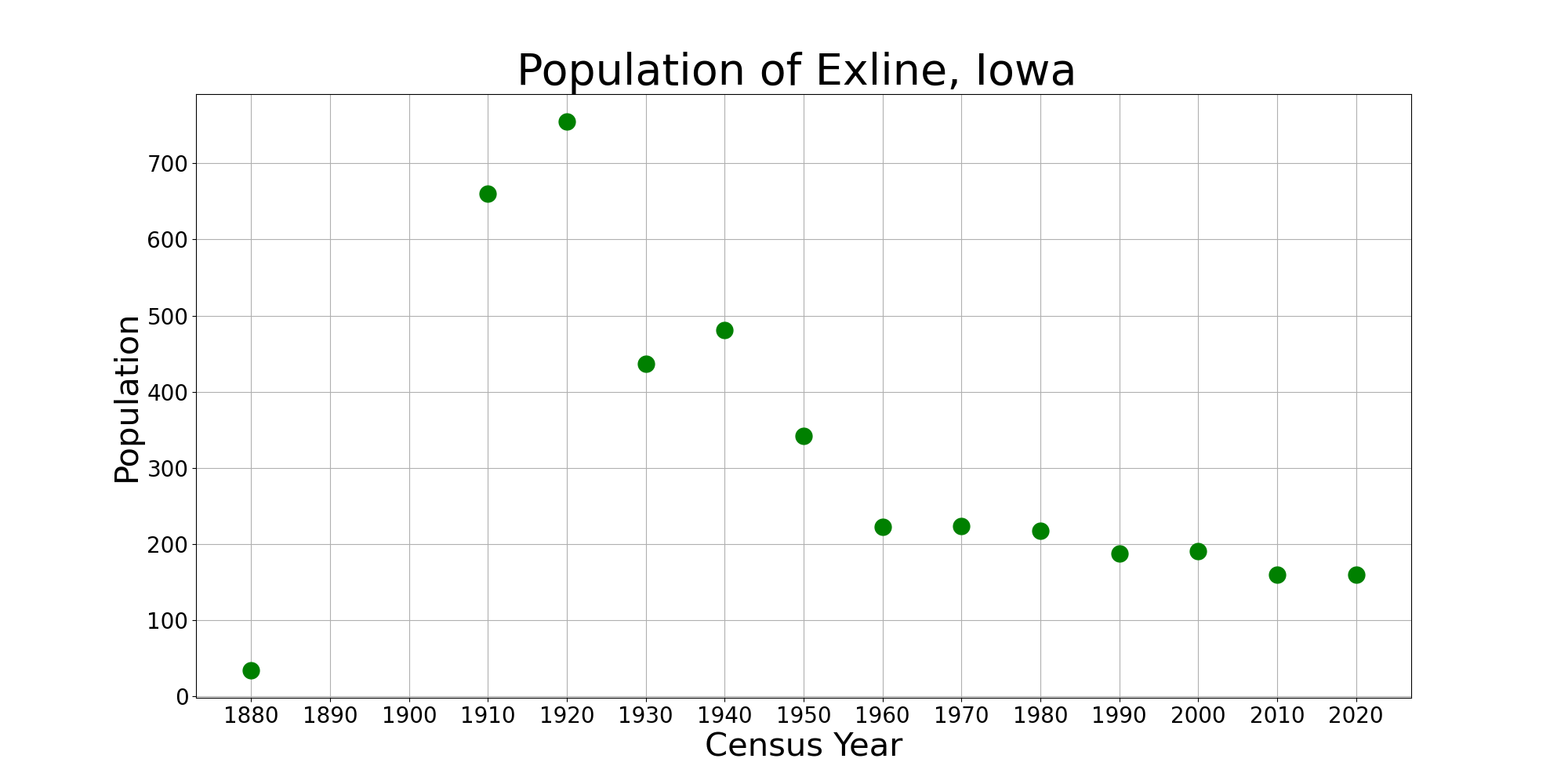
The population of Exline, Iowa from US census data

=== 2020 census ===
As of the census of 2020, there were 160 people, 75 households, and 55 families residing in the city. The population density was 158.8 inhabitants per square mile (61.3/km^{2}). There were 78 housing units at an average density of 77.4 per square mile (29.9/km^{2}). The racial makeup of the city was 96.9% White, 0.0% Black or African American, 0.0% Native American, 0.6% Asian, 0.0% Pacific Islander, 0.0% from other races and 2.5% from two or more races. Hispanic or Latino persons of any race comprised 0.6% of the population.

Of the 75 households, 33.3% of which had children under the age of 18 living with them, 54.7% were married couples living together, 12.0% were cohabitating couples, 10.7% had a female householder with no spouse or partner present and 22.7% had a male householder with no spouse or partner present. 26.7% of all households were non-families. 20.0% of all households were made up of individuals, 8.0% had someone living alone who was 65 years old or older.

The median age in the city was 50.0 years. 25.6% of the residents were under the age of 20; 1.9% were between the ages of 20 and 24; 15.6% were from 25 and 44; 34.4% were from 45 and 64; and 22.5% were 65 years of age or older. The gender makeup of the city was 49.4% male and 50.6% female.

=== 2010 census ===
As of the census of 2010, there were 160 people, 74 households, and 45 families living in the city. The population density was 161.6 inhabitants per square mile (62.4/km^{2}). There were 85 housing units at an average density of 85.9 per square mile (33.2/km^{2}). The racial makeup of the city was 99.4% White and 0.6% from other races. Hispanic or Latino of any race were 3.1% of the population.

There were 74 households, of which 24.3% had children under the age of 18 living with them, 47.3% were married couples living together, 9.5% had a female householder with no husband present, 4.1% had a male householder with no wife present, and 39.2% were non-families. 33.8% of all households were made up of individuals, and 20.3% had someone living alone who was 65 years of age or older. The average household size was 2.16 and the average family size was 2.73.

The median age in the city was 52.3 years. 19.4% of residents were under the age of 18; 3.8% were between the ages of 18 and 24; 20.1% were from 25 to 44; 28.8% were from 45 to 64; and 28.1% were 65 years of age or older. The gender makeup of the city was 48.1% male and 51.9% female.

=== 2000 census ===
As of the census of 2000, there were 191 people, 72 households, and 49 families living in the city. The population density was 192.3 inhabitants per square mile (74.2/km^{2}). There were 81 housing units at an average density of 81.6 per square mile (31.5/km^{2}). The racial makeup of the city was 98.95% White, 0.52% African American and 0.52% Asian.

There were 72 households, out of which 31.9% had children under the age of 18 living with them, 56.9% were married couples living together, 8.3% had a female householder with no husband present, and 30.6% were non-families. 23.6% of all households were made up of individuals, and 11.1% had someone living alone who was 65 years of age or older. The average household size was 2.65 and the average family size was 3.16.

In the city, the population was spread out, with 30.4% under the age of 18, 6.8% from 18 to 24, 26.7% from 25 to 44, 22.0% from 45 to 64, and 14.1% who were 65 years of age or older. The median age was 35 years. For every 100 females, there were 114.6 males. For every 100 females age 18 and over, there were 92.8 males.

The median income for a household in the city was $22,019, and the median income for a family was $19,792. Males had a median income of $23,750 versus $19,444 for females. The per capita income for the city was $11,896. About 29.8% of families and 27.4% of the population were below the poverty line, including 33.3% of those under the age of eighteen and none of those 65 or over.

== Education ==
The Centerville Community School District operates area public schools.
