= Caldwell Township, Appanoose County, Iowa =

Township in Iowa, US

Caldwell Township, Appanoose County
- Township
- Coordinates: 40°37′56″N 092°48′44″W
- Country: United States
- State: Iowa
- County: Appanoose

Area
  - Total: 38.64 sq mi (100.07 km^{2})
  - Land: 38.63 sq mi (100.05 km^{2})
  - Water: 0.0077 sq mi (0.02 km^{2})
- Elevation: 997 ft (304 m)

Population (2010)
  - Total: 425
  - Density: 11/sq mi (4.2/km^{2})
- FIPS code: 19-90435
- GNIS feature ID: 0467518

Caldwell Township is one of eighteen townships in Appanoose County, Iowa, United States. As of the 2010 census, its population was 425.

== Geography ==
Caldwell Township covers an area of 38.63 square miles (100.1 km^{2}) and contains one incorporated settlement, Exline. According to the USGS, it contains five cemeteries: Hism, New Hope, Salem, Union and Zoar.
