= Lincoln Township, Appanoose County, Iowa =

Township in Iowa, US

Lincoln Township, Appanoose County
- Township
- Coordinates: 40°41′41″N 093°01′49″W
- Country: United States
- State: Iowa
- County: Appanoose

Area
  - Total: 24.07 sq mi (62.34 km^{2})
  - Land: 24.06 sq mi (62.32 km^{2})
  - Water: 0.0039 sq mi (0.01 km^{2})
- Elevation: 978 ft (298 m)

Population (2010)
  - Total: 172
  - Density: 7.3/sq mi (2.8/km^{2})
- FIPS code: 19-92520
- GNIS feature ID: 0468239

Lincoln Township is one of eighteen townships in Appanoose County, Iowa, United States. As of the 2010 census, its population was 172.

== Geography ==
Lincoln Township covers an area of 24.1 square miles (62.3 km^{2}) and contains no incorporated settlements. According to the USGS, it contains three cemeteries: Farmers, Jerome and Miller.
