= Independence Township, Appanoose County, Iowa =

Township in Iowa, US

Independence Township, Appanoose County
- Township
- Coordinates: 40°51′36″N 093°02′34″W
- Country: United States
- State: Iowa
- County: Appanoose

Area
  - Total: 35.73 sq mi (92.54 km^{2})
  - Land: 28.10 sq mi (72.77 km^{2})
  - Water: 7.64 sq mi (19.78 km^{2})
- Elevation: 981 ft (299 m)

Population (2010)
  - Total: 248
  - Density: 8.8/sq mi (3.4/km^{2})
- FIPS code: 19-92016
- GNIS feature ID: 0468064

Independence Township is one of eighteen townships in Appanoose County, Iowa, United States. As of the 2010 census, its population was 248.

== History ==
Independence Township was founded in 1848.

In 1857 William Chadwick, Appanoose County justice of peace, plotted the village of Milledgeville along the east bank of the Chariton River.

North Bend Church and the Chariton River Church are in Independence Township.

== Geography ==
Independence Township covers an area of 35.73 square miles (92.54 km^{2}) and contains no incorporated settlements. According to the USGS, it contains six cemeteries: Brushy, Charitan River, Cozad, Johnson, Milledgeville and Wadlington.

== Education ==
The Teagarden School District was formerly located in the township; in 1966 it had 22 students. The district filed a request to merge into the Seymour Community School District. The Board of Education of Wayne County accepted while three members of Appanoose County Board of Education opposed (while two of that county's education board members supported the merger).
