= Franklin Township, Appanoose County, Iowa =

Township in Iowa, US

Franklin Township, Appanoose County
- Township
- Coordinates: 40°37′50″N 093°02′22″W
- Country: United States
- State: Iowa
- County: Appanoose

Area
  - Total: 33.96 sq mi (87.95 km^{2})
  - Land: 33.93 sq mi (87.87 km^{2})
  - Water: 0.031 sq mi (0.08 km^{2})
- Elevation: 1,070 ft (326 m)

Population (2010)
  - Total: 269
  - Density: 8.0/sq mi (3.1/km^{2})
- FIPS code: 19-91386
- GNIS feature ID: 0467849

Franklin Township is one of eighteen townships in Appanoose County, Iowa, United States. As of the 2010 census, its population was 269.

== Geography ==
Franklin Township covers an area of 33.96 square miles (87.95 km^{2}) and contains no incorporated settlements. According to the USGS, it contains three cemeteries: Hibbsville, Livingston and Schultz.
