= Cincinnati, Iowa =

City in Iowa, United States

Cincinnati
- City
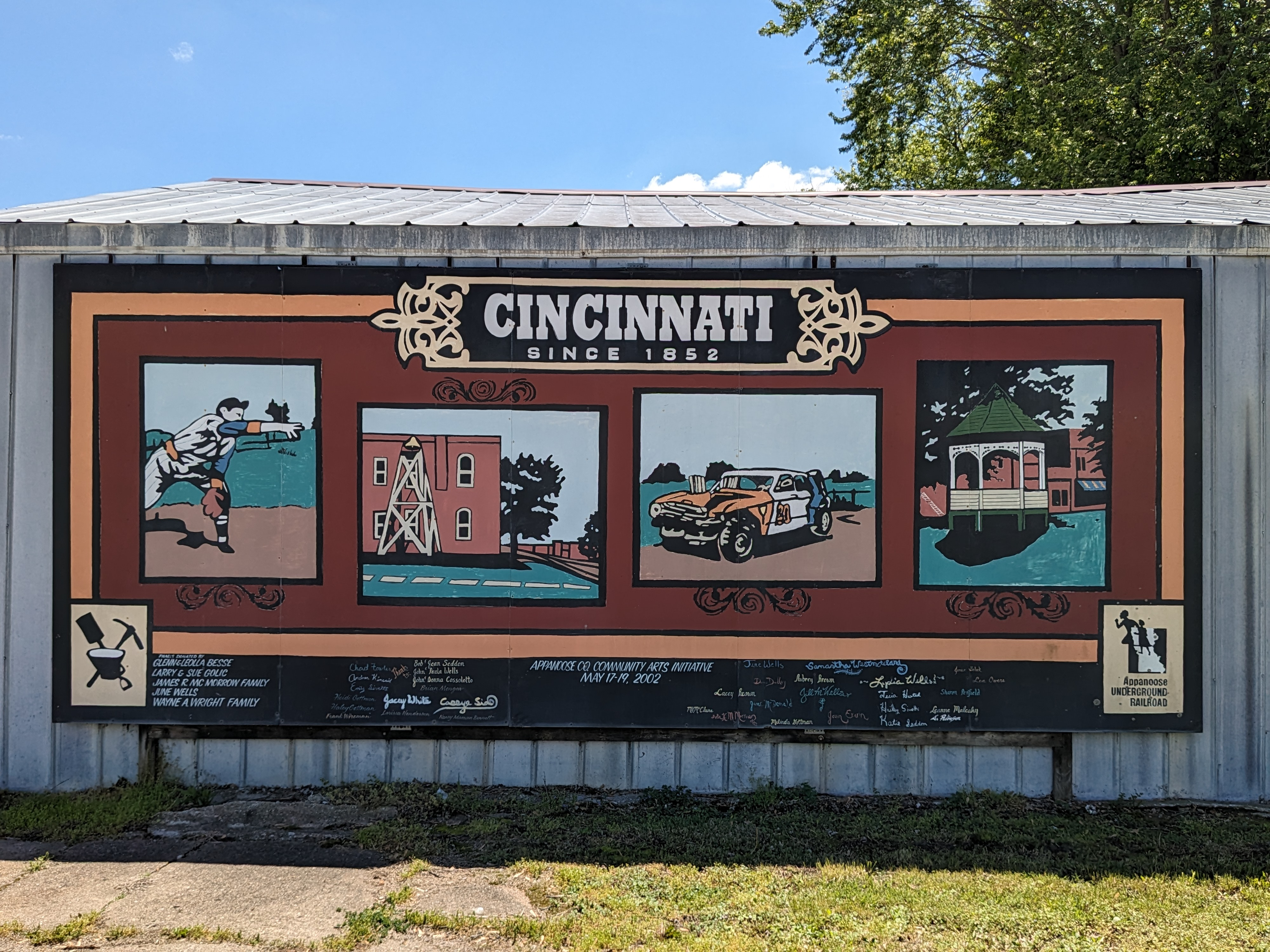
- A mural on the south side of highway 5 passing through Cincinnati, Iowa
- Nickname: CinCy
- Location of Cincinnati, Iowa

- Location within Iowa Location within the United States
- Coordinates: 40°37′41″N 92°55′20″W
- Country: US
- State: Iowa
- County: Appanoose
- Township: Pleasant
- Incorporated: February 13, 1875
- Named for: Cincinnatus

Area
  - Total: 1.76 sq mi (4.55 km^{2})
  - Land: 1.76 sq mi (4.55 km^{2})
  - Water: 0 sq mi (0.00 km^{2})
- Elevation: 1,034 ft (315 m)

Population (2020)
  - Total: 290
  - Density: 165.2/sq mi (63.78/km^{2})
- Time zone: UTC-6 (Central (CST))
  - Summer (DST): UTC-5 (CDT)
- ZIP code: 52549
- Area code: 641
- FIPS code: 19-13395
- GNIS feature ID: 2393525

Cincinnati is a city in Pleasant Township, Appanoose County, Iowa, United States. The population was 290 in the 2020 census, a decline from 428 in 2000.

== Geography ==
According to the United States Census Bureau, the city has a total area of 1.75 square miles (4.53 km^{2}), all land.

The assigned ZIP code of the city is 52549.

== History ==
Cincinnati was platted in 1855. The town of Cincinnati was incorporated in February 1875, and named for the Ohio hometown of early resident J.H.B. Armstrong. Cincinnati was a coal mining camp, and as with many coal camps in the late 19th century, it was a hotbed of union activity, strikes and occasional violence. Company E of the Second Regiment of the Iowa National Guard was called up on April 12, 1895, in response to a request of support from the county sheriff after threats of violence from striking miners in Cincinnati. In 1912, Local 775 of the United Mine Workers based in Cincinnati, had 302 members.

== Demographics ==
Historical population
Census	Pop.	Note	%±
1880	189		—
1890	432		128.6%
1900	1,212		180.6%
1910	1,355		11.8%
1920	1,301		−4.0%
1930	911		−30.0%
1940	859		−5.7%
1950	703		−18.2%
1960	583		−17.1%
1970	570		−2.2%
1980	598		4.9%
1990	363		−39.3%
2000	428		17.9%
2010	357		−16.6%
2020	290		−18.8%
U.S. Decennial Census

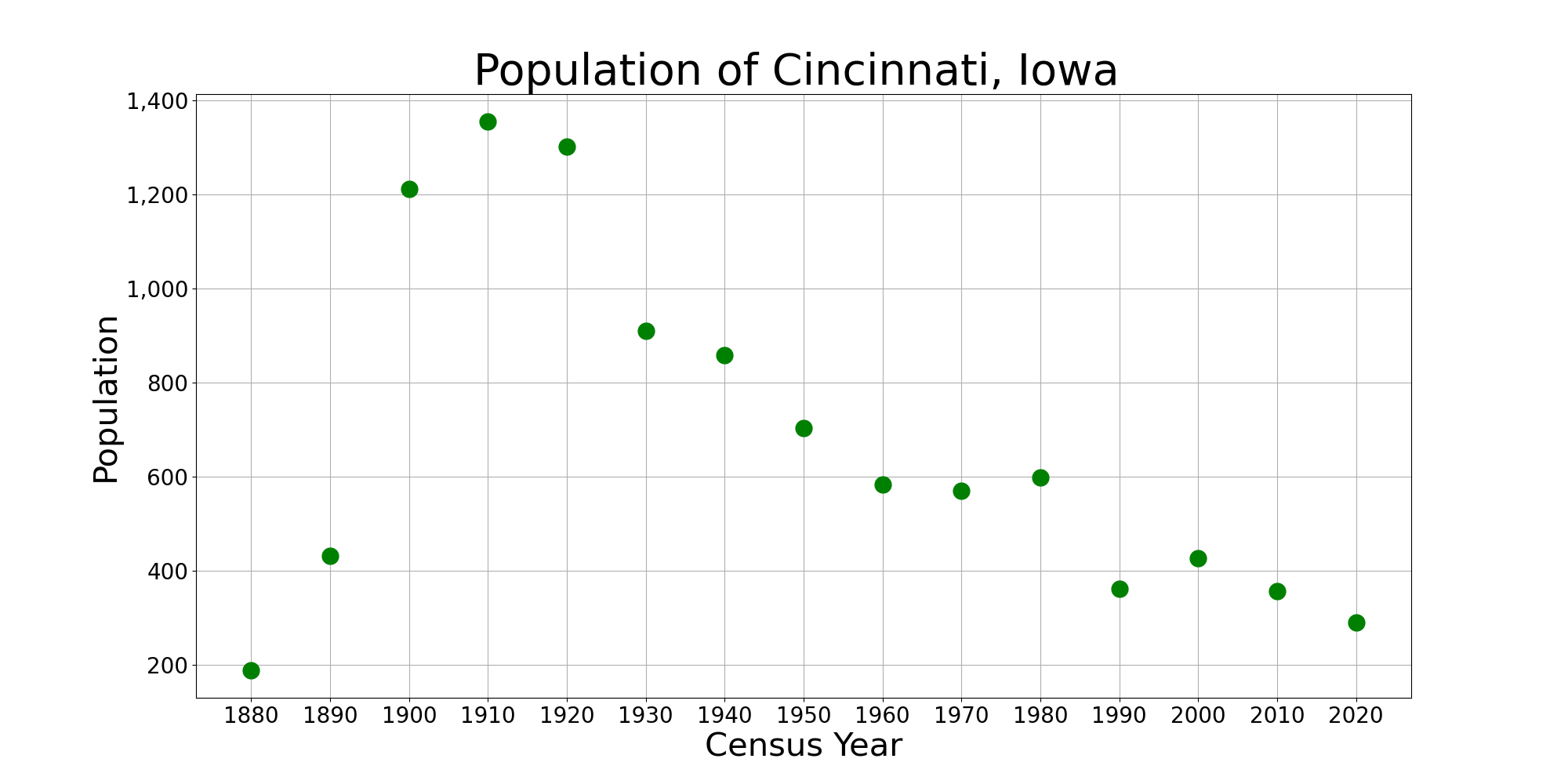
The population of Cincinnati, Iowa from US census data

=== 2020 census ===
As of the census of 2020, there were 290 people, 131 households, and 82 families residing in the city. The population density was 165.2 inhabitants per square mile (63.8/km^{2}). There were 154 housing units at an average density of 87.7 per square mile (33.9/km^{2}). The racial makeup of the city was 94.1% White, 0.0% Black or African American, 0.0% Native American, 0.0% Asian, 0.0% Pacific Islander, 0.0% from other races and 5.9% from two or more races. Hispanic or Latino persons of any race comprised 0.7% of the population.

Of the 131 households, 23.7% of which had children under the age of 18 living with them, 49.6% were married couples living together, 6.9% were cohabitating couples, 19.8% had a female householder with no spouse or partner present and 23.7% had a male householder with no spouse or partner present. 37.4% of all households were non-families. 31.3% of all households were made up of individuals, 16.8% had someone living alone who was 65 years old or older.

The median age in the city was 47.5 years. 20.7% of the residents were under the age of 20; 3.8% were between the ages of 20 and 24; 23.1% were from 25 and 44; 30.0% were from 45 and 64; and 22.4% were 65 years of age or older. The gender makeup of the city was 52.8% male and 47.2% female.

=== 2010 census ===
As of the census of 2010, there were 357 people, 159 households, and 98 families living in the city. The population density was 204.0 inhabitants per square mile (78.8/km^{2}). There were 184 housing units at an average density of 105.1 per square mile (40.6/km^{2}). The racial makeup of the city was 97.5% White, 0.3% Asian, and 2.2% from two or more races. Hispanic or Latino of any race were 1.1% of the population.

There were 159 households, of which 23.3% had children under the age of 18 living with them, 49.1% were married couples living together, 8.2% had a female householder with no husband present, 4.4% had a male householder with no wife present, and 38.4% were non-families. 31.4% of all households were made up of individuals, and 15.1% had someone living alone who was 65 years of age or older. The average household size was 2.25 and the average family size was 2.85.

The median age in the city was 44.4 years. 19.9% of residents were under the age of 18; 7.6% were between the ages of 18 and 24; 23.5% were from 25 to 44; 29.7% were from 45 to 64; and 19.3% were 65 years of age or older. The gender makeup of the city was 50.1% male and 49.9% female.

=== 2000 census ===
As of the census of 2000, there were 428 people, 180 households, and 113 families living in the city. The population density was 245.9 inhabitants per square mile (94.9/km^{2}). There were 201 housing units at an average density of 115.5 per square mile (44.6/km^{2}). The racial makeup of the city was 98.13% White, 0.23% from other races, and 1.64% from two or more races. Hispanic or Latino of any race were 1.17% of the population.

There were 180 households, out of which 30.6% had children under the age of 18 living with them, 46.7% were married couples living together, 11.1% had a female householder with no husband present, and 37.2% were non-families. 31.7% of all households were made up of individuals, and 18.9% had someone living alone who was 65 years of age or older. The average household size was 2.38 and the average family size was 3.03.

In the city, the population was spread out, with 25.0% under the age of 18, 7.9% from 18 to 24, 26.4% from 25 to 44, 21.3% from 45 to 64, and 19.4% who were 65 years of age or older. The median age was 38 years. For every 100 females, there were 86.9 males. For every 100 females age 18 and over, there were 82.4 males.

The median income for a household in the city was $26,641, and the median income for a family was $28,250. Males had a median income of $25,556 versus $19,904 for females. The per capita income for the city was $12,489. About 11.0% of families and 11.4% of the population were below the poverty line, including 9.0% of those under age 18 and 21.7% of those age 65 or over.

== Education ==
The Centerville Community School District operates area public schools.

== Notable person ==
- Rick Mathews, Major League Baseball coach and scout
