= Douglas Township, Appanoose County, Iowa =

Township in Iowa, US

Douglas Township, Appanoose County
- Township
- Coordinates: 40°47′51″N 092°48′28″W
- Country: United States
- State: Iowa
- County: Appanoose

Area
  - Total: 21.43 sq mi (55.51 km^{2})
  - Land: 21.42 sq mi (55.47 km^{2})
  - Water: 0.015 sq mi (0.04 km^{2})
- Elevation: 955 ft (291 m)

Population (2010)
  - Total: 187
  - Density: 8.8/sq mi (3.4/km^{2})
- FIPS code: 19-91023
- GNIS feature ID: 0467723

Douglas Township is one of eighteen townships in Appanoose County, Iowa, United States. As of the 2010 census, its population was 187.

== Geography ==
Douglas Township covers an area of 21.43 square miles (55.51 km^{2}) and contains no incorporated settlements. According to the USGS, it contains four cemeteries: Bryant, Haynes, Martin and Salem.
