= Union Township, Appanoose County, Iowa =

Township in Iowa, US

Union Township, Appanoose County
- Township
- Coordinates: 40°51′26″N 092°41′38″W
- Country: United States
- State: Iowa
- County: Appanoose

Area
  - Total: 26.69 sq mi (69.13 km^{2})
  - Land: 26.52 sq mi (68.68 km^{2})
  - Water: 0.17 sq mi (0.45 km^{2})
- Elevation: 820 ft (250 m)

Population (2010)
  - Total: 157
  - Density: 6.0/sq mi (2.3/km^{2})
- FIPS code: 19-94167
- GNIS feature ID: 0468807

Union Township is one of eighteen townships in Appanoose County, Iowa, United States. As of the 2010 census, its population was 157.

== History ==
Union Township was founded in 1848.

== Geography ==
Union Township covers an area of 26.69 square miles (69.1 km^{2}) and contains no incorporated settlements. According to the USGS, it contains three cemeteries: Albany, Knapp and Sales.
