= Taylor Township, Appanoose County, Iowa =

Township in Iowa, US

Taylor Township, Appanoose County
- Township
- Coordinates: 40°52′08″N 092°48′58″W
- Country: United States
- State: Iowa
- County: Appanoose

Area
  - Total: 29.61 sq mi (76.69 km^{2})
  - Land: 29.56 sq mi (76.57 km^{2})
  - Water: 0.046 sq mi (0.12 km^{2})
- Elevation: 994 ft (303 m)

Population (2010)
  - Total: 870
  - Density: 30/sq mi (11.4/km^{2})
- FIPS code: 19-94092
- GNIS feature ID: 0468782

Taylor Township is one of eighteen townships in Appanoose County, Iowa, United States. As of the 2010 census, its population was 870.

== Geography ==
Taylor Township covers an area of 29.6 square miles (76.7 km^{2}) and contains one incorporated settlement, Moravia. According to the USGS, it contains five cemeteries: Denny, Fairview now called Main Station, Hillcrest, Moravia and New Hope.
