= Pleasant Township, Appanoose County, Iowa =

Township in Iowa, US

Pleasant Township, Appanoose County
- Township
- Coordinates: 40°37′58″N 092°55′32″W
- Country: United States
- State: Iowa
- County: Appanoose

Area
  - Total: 39.15 sq mi (101.41 km^{2})
  - Land: 39.13 sq mi (101.35 km^{2})
  - Water: 0.023 sq mi (0.06 km^{2})
- Elevation: 1,024 ft (312 m)

Population (2010)
  - Total: 793
  - Density: 20/sq mi (7.8/km^{2})
- FIPS code: 19-93357
- GNIS feature ID: 0468527

Pleasant Township is one of eighteen townships in Appanoose County, Iowa, United States. As of the 2010 census, its population was 793.

== Geography ==
Pleasant Township covers an area of 39.2 square miles (101.4 km^{2}) and contains one incorporated settlement, Cincinnati. According to the USGS, it contains nine cemeteries: Adamson, Baker, Boswell, Evergreen, Morrison, Motto, Pleasant Hill, Porter and White.
