= Chariton Township, Appanoose County, Iowa =

Township in Iowa, US

Chariton Township, Appanoose County
- Township
- Coordinates: 40°51′55″N 092°55′41″W
- Country: United States
- State: Iowa
- County: Appanoose

Area
  - Total: 22.98 sq mi (59.51 km^{2})
  - Land: 15.95 sq mi (41.32 km^{2})
  - Water: 7.03 sq mi (18.20 km^{2})
- Elevation: 955 ft (291 m)

Population (2010)
  - Total: 161
  - Density: 10/sq mi (3.9/km^{2})
- FIPS code: 19-90642
- GNIS feature ID: 0467590

Chariton Township is one of eighteen townships in Appanoose County, Iowa, United States. As of the 2010 census, its population was 161.

== Geography ==
Chariton Township covers an area of 22.98 square miles (59.51 km^{2}) and contains no incorporated settlements. According to the USGS, it contains four cemeteries: Antioch, Fleenor, Iconium and Salem.
