= Vermillion Township, Appanoose County, Iowa =

Township in Iowa, US

Vermillion Township, Appanoose County
- Township
- Coordinates: 40°43′26″N 092°51′27″W
- Country: United States
- State: Iowa
- County: Appanoose

Area
  - Total: 22.0 sq mi (57.1 km^{2})
  - Land: 21.9 sq mi (56.6 km^{2})
  - Water: 0.19 sq mi (0.5 km^{2})
- Elevation: 980 ft (300 m)

Population (2010)
  - Total: 808
  - Density: 37/sq mi (14.3/km^{2})
- FIPS code: 19-94329
- GNIS feature ID: 0468860

Vermillion Township is one of eighteen townships in Appanoose County, Iowa, United States. As of the 2010 census, its population was 808. It completely surrounds the city of Centerville and has had small portions of its area get annexed.

== Geography ==
Vermillion Township covers an area of 22.0 square miles (57.1 km^{2}) and contains no incorporated settlements. According to the USGS, it contains three cemeteries: Dale, Jewish and Thomas. From time to time, the city of Centerville has annexed portions of the township.
