= Unionville, Iowa =

- City
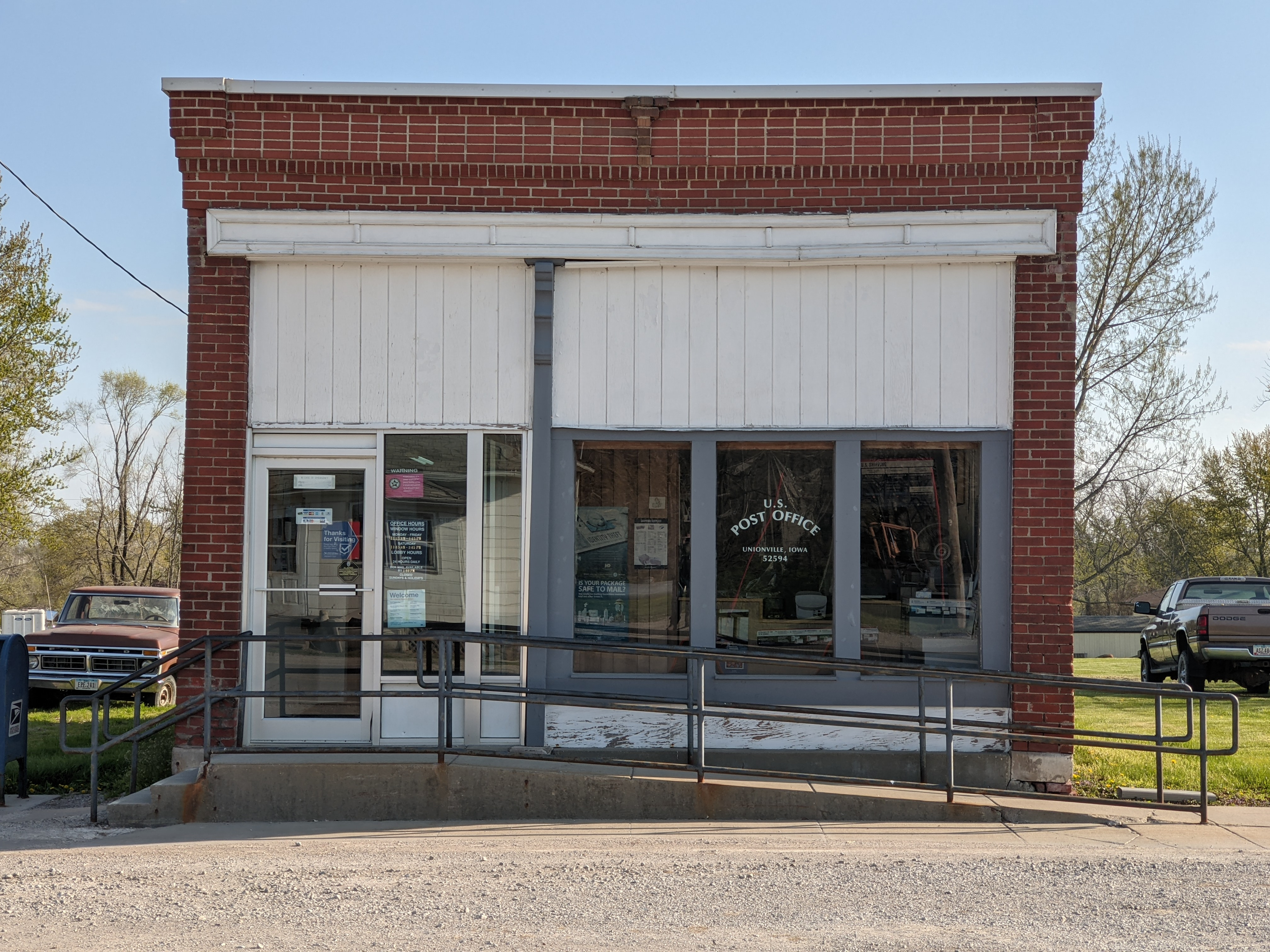
- The post office building in Unionville, Iowa

- Location of Unionville, Iowa
- Coordinates: 40°49′05″N 92°41′45″W
- Country: US
- State: Iowa
- County: Appanoose

Area
  - Total: 0.75 sq mi (1.95 km^{2})
  - Land: 0.75 sq mi (1.95 km^{2})
  - Water: 0 sq mi (0.00 km^{2})
- Elevation: 948 ft (289 m)

Population (2020)
  - Total: 75
  - Density: 99.8/sq mi (38.53/km^{2})
- Time zone: UTC-6 (Central (CST))
  - Summer (DST): UTC-5 (CDT)
- ZIP code: 52594
- Area code: 641
- FIPS code: 19-79680
- GNIS feature ID: 2397089

Unionville is a city in Appanoose County, Iowa, United States. The population was 75 at the time of the 2020 census.

== History ==
Unionville claims to be the oldest settlement in Appanoose County; the first settlers arrived in 1843 and the first school was built in 1846. J. F. Stratton surveyed Unionville in 1848 on land "near the old dragoon trail, the Mormon trail". Unionville was founded in 1849. The city's name most likely commemorates the federal union. Unionville was incorporated as a city in 1922.

== Geography ==
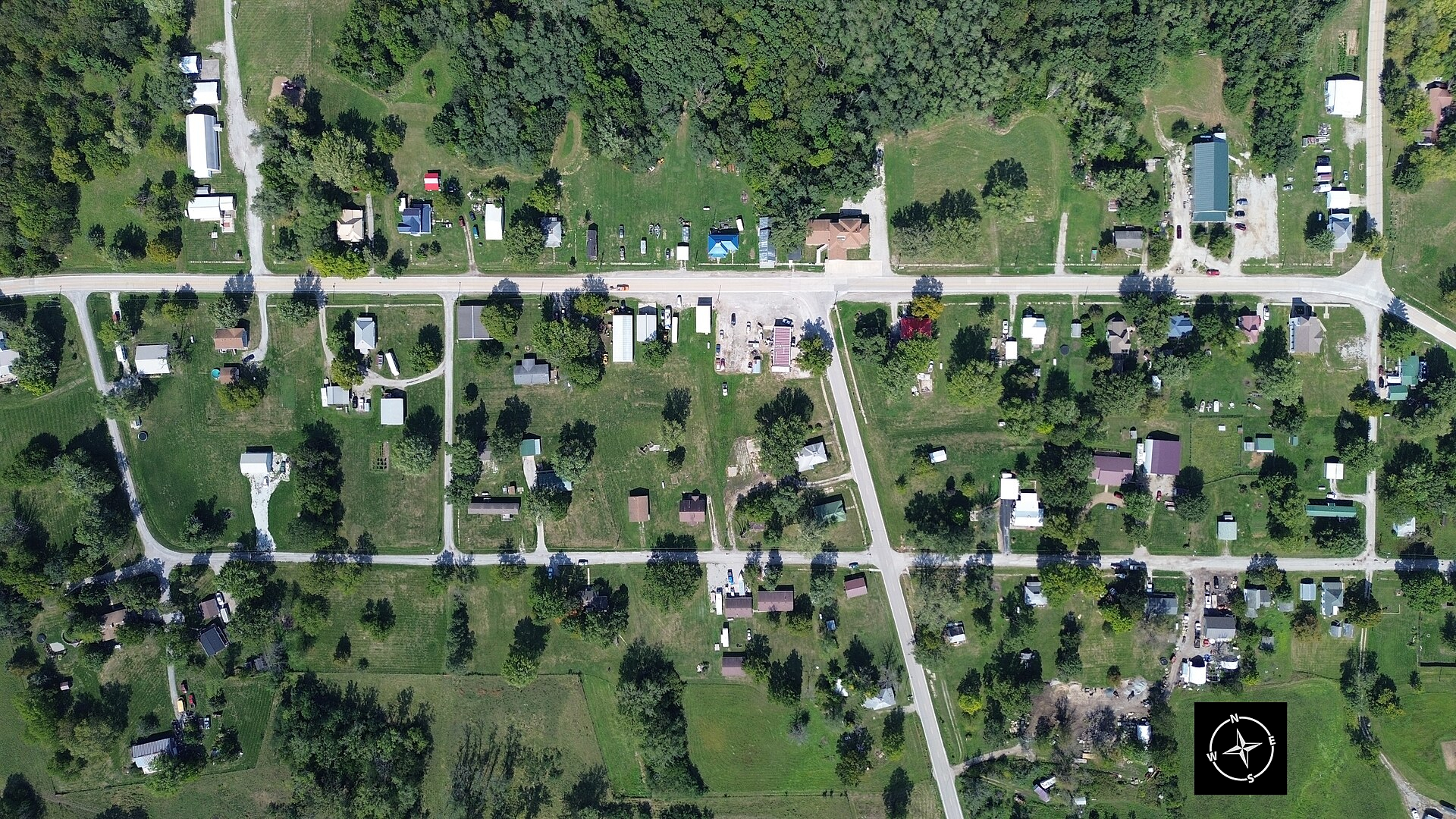
An aerial photograph of Unionville, Iowa, taken September 20, 2023

According to the United States Census Bureau, the city has a total area of 0.75 square miles (1.94 km^{2}), all land.

== Demographics ==
Historical Populations
Year	Pop.	±%
1860	178	—
1870	183	+2.8%
1880	196	+7.1%
1890	275	+40.3%
1900	355	+29.1%
1910	315	−11.3%
1920	208	−34.0%
1930	221	+6.2%
1940	253	+14.5%
1950	204	−19.4%
1960	185	−9.3%
1970	161	−13.0%
1980	150	−6.8%
1990	133	−11.3%
2000	127	−4.5%
2010	102	−19.7%
2020	75	−26.5%
Source:"U.S. Census website". United States Census Bureau. and Iowa Data Center; Source: U.S. Decennial Census

=== 2020 census ===
As of the census of 2020, there were 75 people, 37 households, and 23 families residing in the city. The population density was 99.2 inhabitants per square mile (38.3/km^{2}). There were 49 housing units at an average density of 64.8 per square mile (25.0/km^{2}). The racial makeup of the city was 96.0% White, 0.0% Black or African American, 0.0% Native American, 0.0% Asian, 0.0% Pacific Islander, 1.3% from other races and 2.7% from two or more races. Hispanic or Latino persons of any race comprised 1.3% of the population.

Of the 37 households, 29.7% of which had children under the age of 18 living with them, 40.5% were married couples living together, 8.1% were cohabitating couples, 37.8% had a female householder with no spouse or partner present and 13.5% had a male householder with no spouse or partner present. 37.8% of all households were non-families. 32.4% of all households were made up of individuals, 18.9% had someone living alone who was 65 years old or older.

The median age in the city was 49.8 years. 18.7% of the residents were under the age of 20; 5.3% were between the ages of 20 and 24; 21.3% were from 25 and 44; 22.7% were from 45 and 64; and 32.0% were 65 years of age or older. The gender makeup of the city was 45.3% male and 54.7% female.

=== 2010 census ===
As of the census of 2010, there were 102 people, 49 households, and 29 families living in the city. The population density was 136.0 inhabitants per square mile (52.5/km^{2}). There were 60 housing units at an average density of 80.0 per square mile (30.9/km^{2}). The racial makeup of the city was 100.0% White. Hispanic or Latino of any race were 3.9% of the population.

There were 49 households, of which 26.5% had children under the age of 18 living with them, 46.9% were married couples living together, 8.2% had a female householder with no husband present, 4.1% had a male householder with no wife present, and 40.8% were non-families. 36.7% of all households were made up of individuals, and 12.3% had someone living alone who was 65 years of age or older. The average household size was 2.08 and the average family size was 2.66.

The median age in the city was 51.8 years. 17.6% of residents were under the age of 18; 7% were between the ages of 18 and 24; 18.6% were from 25 to 44; 40.2% were from 45 to 64; and 16.7% were 65 years of age or older. The gender makeup of the city was 49.0% male and 51.0% female.

=== 2000 census ===
As of the census of 2000, there were 127 people, 50 households, and 38 families living in the city. The population density was 170.5 inhabitants per square mile (65.8/km^{2}). There were 68 housing units at an average density of 91.3 per square mile (35.3/km^{2}). The racial makeup of the city was 100.00% White.

There were 50 households, out of which 38.0% had children under the age of 18 living with them, 64.0% were married couples living together, 8.0% had a female householder with no husband present, and 24.0% were non-families. 24.0% of all households were made up of individuals, and 12.0% had someone living alone who was 65 years of age or older. The average household size was 2.54 and the average family size was 3.00.

In the city, the population was spread out, with 26.8% under the age of 18, 5.5% from 18 to 24, 24.4% from 25 to 44, 18.9% from 45 to 64, and 24.4% who were 65 years of age or older. The median age was 42 years. For every 100 females, there were 89.6 males. For every 100 females age 18 and over, there were 86.0 males.

The median income for a household in the city was $33,333, and the median income for a family was $44,375. Males had a median income of $26,250 versus $19,375 for females. The per capita income for the city was $13,856. There were 9.1% of families and 11.3% of the population living below the poverty line, including 22.2% of under eighteens and none of those over 64.
