= Rathbun, Iowa =

- City
- Location of Rathbun, Iowa
- Coordinates: 40°48′07″N 92°53′16″W
- Country: US
- State: Iowa
- County: Appanoose

Area
  - Total: 0.21 sq mi (0.55 km^{2})
  - Land: 0.21 sq mi (0.55 km^{2})
  - Water: 0 sq mi (0.00 km^{2})
- Elevation: 906 ft (276 m)

Population (2020)
  - Total: 43
  - Density: 200.9/sq mi (77.58/km^{2})
- Time zone: UTC-6 (Central (CST))
  - Summer (DST): UTC-5 (CDT)
- ZIP Code: 52544
- Area code: 641
- FIPS code: 19-65730
- GNIS feature ID: 2396323

Rathbun is a city in Appanoose County, Iowa, United States. The population was 43 at the time of the 2020 census.

== History ==
Incorporated in 1897, Rathbun was established in 1892 as a mining town. It was named for Charles H. Rathbun, a mine official. At the end of the 19th century, "the valley of Walnut Creek was one continuous mining camp, known under different names, Jerome, Diamond, Mystic, Clarksdale, Rathbun and Darby" (later known as Darbyville).

The Star Coal Company of Streator, Ill. operated the Rathbun Mine, with an 82-foot-deep (25 m) shaft. This mine was in operation in 1895, and by 1908 it was considered one of the best equipped longwall mines in the county. The Darby mine, operated by the Unity Block Coal Company, was about a mile northeast of Rathbun. This had a 50-foot (15 m) shaft and was nearly played out by 1908. The Evans Mine, about halfway between the Rathbun and Darbyville, formerly operated by the American Coal Company, had already been closed by 1908. In 1912, United Mine Workers Local 372 in Rathbun had 213 members. This was close to half the total population at the time.

== Geography ==
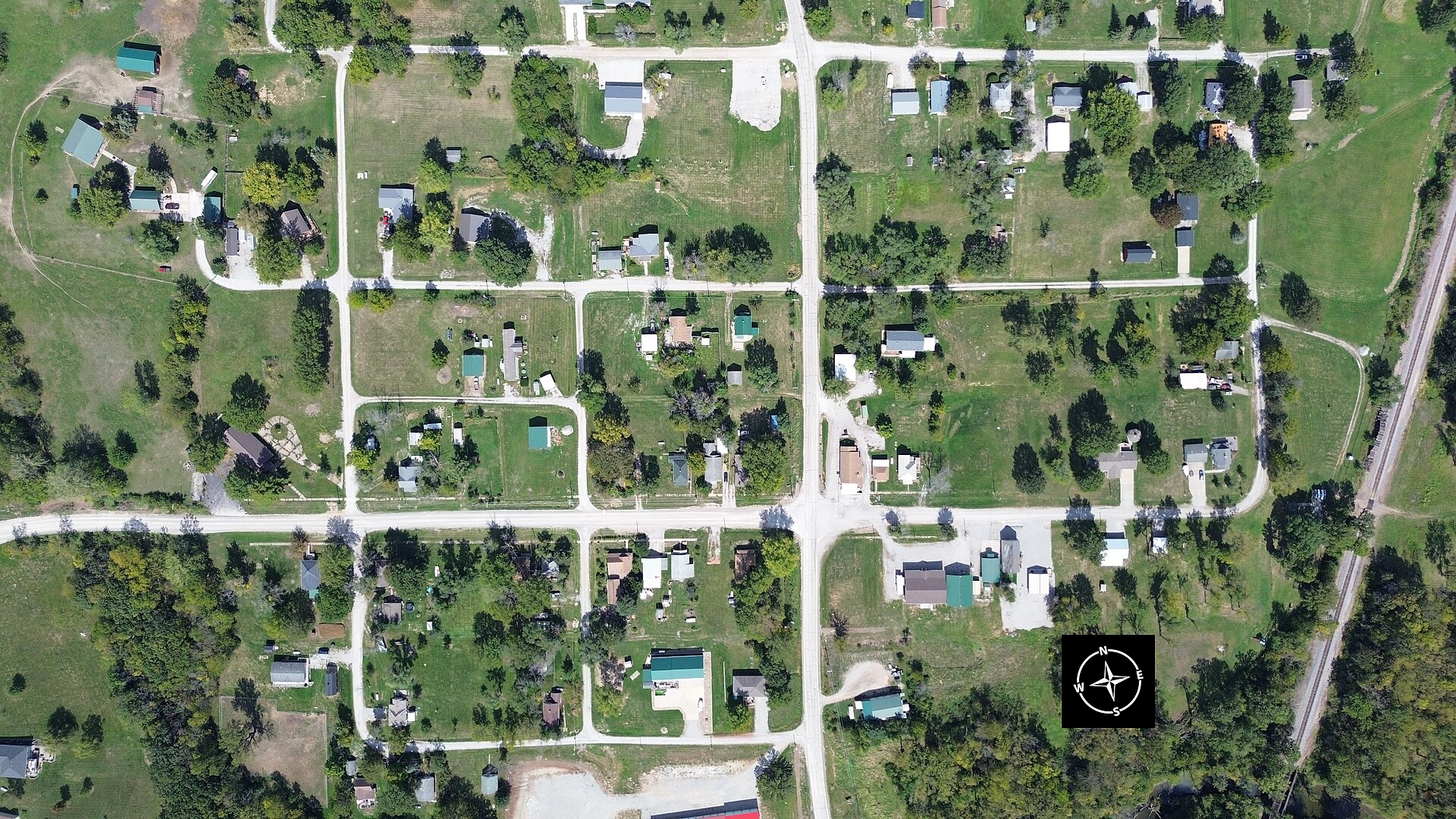
An aerial photograph of Rathbun, Iowa, taken on September 25, 2023

Rathbun is located approximately one mile west of the confluence of Walnut Creek and the Chariton River, about two miles south of the Rathbun Dam.

According to the United States Census Bureau, the city has a total area of 0.22 square miles (0.57 km^{2}), all land.

=== Climate ===
According to the Köppen Climate Classification system, Rathbun has a hot-summer humid continental climate, abbreviated "Dfa" on climate maps.

Climate data for Rathbun, Iowa, 1991–2020 normals, extremes 1970–present
Month	Jan	Feb	Mar	Apr	May	Jun	Jul	Aug	Sep	Oct	Nov	Dec	Year
Record high °F (°C)	67 (19)	76 (24)	87 (31)	89 (32)	97 (36)	103 (39)	106 (41)	104 (40)	99 (37)	92 (33)	79 (26)	74 (23)	106 (41)
Mean maximum °F (°C)	55.0 (12.8)	59.9 (15.5)	73.5 (23.1)	81.9 (27.7)	87.2 (30.7)	91.5 (33.1)	95.4 (35.2)	95.1 (35.1)	90.0 (32.2)	83.8 (28.8)	70.4 (21.3)	58.9 (14.9)	97.3 (36.3)
Mean daily maximum °F (°C)	31.3 (−0.4)	36.6 (2.6)	49.6 (9.8)	61.8 (16.6)	71.4 (21.9)	80.9 (27.2)	85.0 (29.4)	83.5 (28.6)	76.6 (24.8)	64.6 (18.1)	49.7 (9.8)	37.2 (2.9)	60.7 (15.9)
Daily mean °F (°C)	22.0 (−5.6)	26.1 (−3.3)	38.8 (3.8)	50.3 (10.2)	61.4 (16.3)	71.2 (21.8)	75.3 (24.1)	73.5 (23.1)	65.2 (18.4)	53.3 (11.8)	39.6 (4.2)	28.2 (−2.1)	50.4 (10.2)
Mean daily minimum °F (°C)	12.7 (−10.7)	15.6 (−9.1)	27.6 (−2.4)	38.7 (3.7)	51.3 (10.7)	61.4 (16.3)	65.6 (18.7)	63.5 (17.5)	53.8 (12.1)	42.0 (5.6)	29.4 (−1.4)	19.1 (−7.2)	40.1 (4.5)
Mean minimum °F (°C)	−8.0 (−22.2)	−2.9 (−19.4)	8.3 (−13.2)	25.8 (−3.4)	38.0 (3.3)	50.4 (10.2)	56.1 (13.4)	54.1 (12.3)	41.1 (5.1)	27.1 (−2.7)	13.4 (−10.3)	0.2 (−17.7)	−11.9 (−24.4)
Record low °F (°C)	−28 (−33)	−26 (−32)	−11 (−24)	12 (−11)	28 (−2)	41 (5)	43 (6)	43 (6)	30 (−1)	16 (−9)	−8 (−22)	−26 (−32)	−28 (−33)
Average precipitation inches (mm)	1.09 (28)	1.49 (38)	2.03 (52)	3.93 (100)	5.36 (136)	5.24 (133)	4.57 (116)	4.62 (117)	3.81 (97)	2.93 (74)	2.04 (52)	1.46 (37)	38.57 (980)
Average snowfall inches (cm)	7.2 (18)	3.0 (7.6)	2.1 (5.3)	0.5 (1.3)	0.0 (0.0)	0.0 (0.0)	0.0 (0.0)	0.0 (0.0)	0.0 (0.0)	trace	0.1 (0.25)	3.7 (9.4)	16.6 (41.85)
Average precipitation days (≥ 0.01 in)	8.0	5.4	8.1	11.7	13.6	11.8	10.5	10.3	8.2	9.8	6.1	6.7	110.2
Average snowy days (≥ 0.1 in)	5.0	1.5	1.0	0.2	0.0	0.0	0.0	0.0	0.0	0.0	0.1	1.3	9.1
Source 1: NOAA
Source 2: National Weather Service

== Demographics ==
Historical populations
Year	Pop.	±%
1900	270	—
1910	382	+41.5%
1920	630	+64.9%
1930	299	−52.5%
1940	352	+17.7%
1950	229	−34.9%
1960	203	−11.4%
1970	113	−44.3%
1980	93	−17.7%
1990	89	−4.3%
2000	88	−1.1%
2010	89	+1.1%
2020	43	−51.7%
Iowa Data Center; Source: U.S. Decennial Census

=== 2020 census ===
As of the census of 2020, there were 43 people, 25 households, and 18 families residing in the city. The population density was 200.9 inhabitants per square mile (77.6/km^{2}). There were 31 housing units at an average density of 144.9 per square mile (55.9/km^{2}). The racial makeup of the city was 88.4% White, 0.0% Black or African American, 0.0% Native American, 0.0% Asian, 2.3% Pacific Islander, 0.0% from other races and 9.3% from two or more races. Hispanic or Latino persons of any race comprised 2.3% of the population.

Of the 25 households, 28.0% of which had children under the age of 18 living with them, 48.0% were married couples living together, 4.0% were cohabitating couples, 16.0% had a female householder with no spouse or partner present and 32.0% had a male householder with no spouse or partner present. 28.0% of all households were non-families. 28.0% of all households were made up of individuals, 4.0% had someone living alone who was 65 years old or older.

The median age in the city was 55.5 years. 11.6% of the residents were under the age of 20; 0.0% were between the ages of 20 and 24; 18.6% were from 25 and 44; 32.6% were from 45 and 64; and 37.2% were 65 years of age or older. The gender makeup of the city was 51.2% male and 48.8% female.

=== 2010 census ===
As of the census of 2010, there were 89 people, 42 households, and 27 families living in the city. The population density was 404.5 inhabitants per square mile (156.2/km^{2}). There were 51 housing units at an average density of 231.8 per square mile (89.5/km^{2}). The racial makeup of the city was 98.9% White and 1.1% from two or more races. Hispanic or Latino of any race were 1.1% of the population.

There were 42 households, of which 19.0% had children under the age of 18 living with them, 61.9% were married couples living together, 2.4% had a male householder with no wife present, and 35.7% were non-families. 33.3% of all households were made up of individuals, and 11.9% had someone living alone who was 65 years of age or older. The average household size was 2.12 and the average family size was 2.67.

The median age in the city was 47.5 years. 18% of residents were under the age of 18; 5.6% were between the ages of 18 and 24; 19.1% were from 25 to 44; 37.2% were from 45 to 64; and 20.2% were 65 years of age or older. The gender makeup of the city was 53.9% male and 46.1% female.

=== 2000 census ===
As of the census of 2000, there were 88 people, 39 households, and 24 families living in the city. The population density was 408.7 inhabitants per square mile (157.8/km^{2}). There were 53 housing units at an average density of 246.2 per square mile (95.1/km^{2}). The racial makeup of the city was 98.86% White, and 1.14% from two or more races.

There were 39 households, out of which 30.8% had children under the age of 18 living with them, 56.4% were married couples living together, 2.6% had a female householder with no husband present, and 35.9% were non-families. 30.8% of all households were made up of individuals, and 17.9% had someone living alone who was 65 years of age or older. The average household size was 2.26 and the average family size was 2.80.

In the city, the population was spread out, with 21.6% under the age of 18, 8.0% from 18 to 24, 22.7% from 25 to 44, 27.3% from 45 to 64, and 20.5% who were 65 years of age or older. The median age was 44 years. For every 100 females, there were 83.3 males. For every 100 females age 18 and over, there were 109.1 males.

The median income for a household in the city was $40,000, and the median income for a family was $40,625. Males had a median income of $25,833 versus $25,833 for females. The per capita income for the city was $14,749. There were 18.5% of families and 17.0% of the population living below the poverty line, including 28.0% of under eighteens and 10.0% of those over 64.

== Education ==
The Centerville Community School District operates area public schools.
