= Sharon Township, Appanoose County, Iowa =

Township in Iowa, US

Sharon Township, Appanoose County
- Township
- Coordinates: 40°43′34″N 092°47′41″W
- Country: United States
- State: Iowa
- County: Appanoose

Area
  - Total: 24.00 sq mi (62.17 km^{2})
  - Land: 23.99 sq mi (62.14 km^{2})
  - Water: 0.012 sq mi (0.03 km^{2})
- Elevation: 840 ft (256 m)

Population (2010)
  - Total: 199
  - Density: 8.3/sq mi (3.2/km^{2})
- FIPS code: 19-93822
- GNIS feature ID: 0468683

Sharon Township is one of eighteen townships in Appanoose County, Iowa, United States. As of the 2010 census, its population was 199.

== Geography ==
Sharon Township covers an area of 24.0 square miles (62.2 km^{2}) and contains no incorporated settlements. According to the USGS, it contains five cemeteries: Brannon, Mount Ararat, Perjue, Sharon and Sharon.
