= Mystic, Iowa =

- City
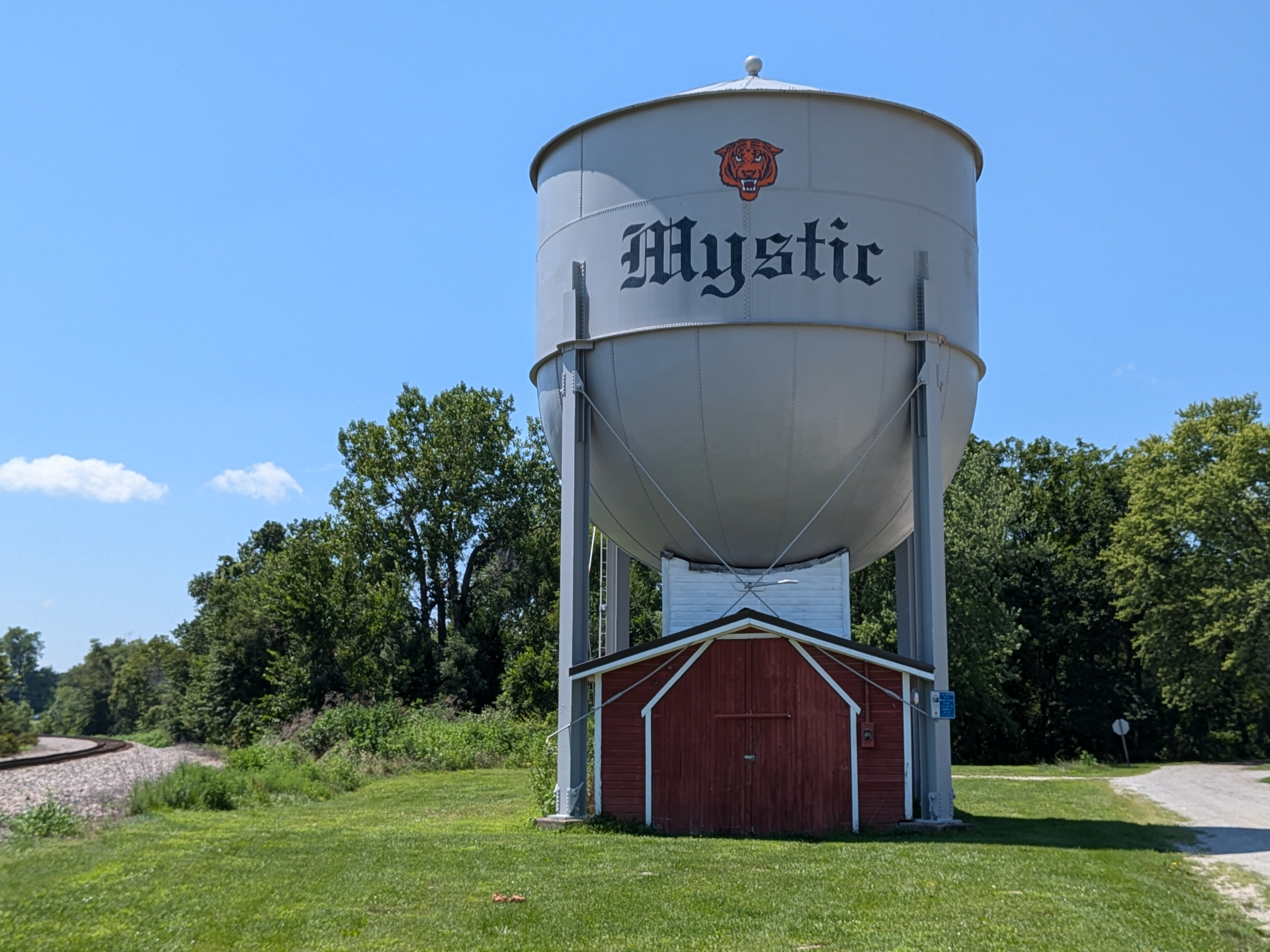
- A railroad water tank near the south end of Mystic

- Location of Mystic, Iowa
- Coordinates: 40°46′45″N 92°56′40″W
- Country: US
- State: Iowa
- County: Appanoose

Area
  - Total: 2.95 sq mi (7.63 km^{2})
  - Land: 2.95 sq mi (7.63 km^{2})
  - Water: 0 sq mi (0.00 km^{2})
- Elevation: 955 ft (291 m)

Population (2020)
  - Total: 322
  - Density: 109.3/sq mi (42.22/km^{2})
- Time zone: UTC-6 (Central (CST))
  - Summer (DST): UTC-5 (CDT)
- ZIP Code: 52574
- Area code: 641
- FIPS code: 19-55200
- GNIS feature ID: 2395146

Mystic is a city in Appanoose County, Iowa, United States. The population was 322 at the time of the 2020 census.

== History ==
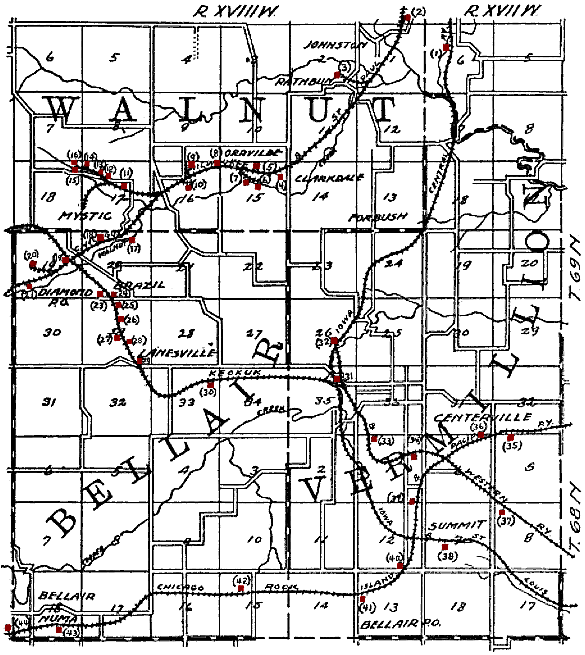
Map of the Mystic and Brazil area from 1908, showing the railroads and shipping coal mines (shown in red) of the region. Mystic and Brazil are in the upper left quadrant. Smaller mines that did not ship by rail are not shown.

At the end of the 19th century, "the valley of Walnut Creek was one continuous mining camp, known under different names, Jerome, Diamond, Mystic, Clarkdale, Rathbun and Darby" (later known as Darbyville). The present name is derived from Mystic, Connecticut. A. M. Elgin opened the first coal mine in the Mystic area in 1857, about 1.5 miles north of Mystic on Little Walnut Creek. The Mystic coal seam was exposed on the surface there, and drifts were opened and abandoned over the next few decades until the hills were honeycombed with mines.

In 1858, Isaac Fuller opened a large mine in Mystic, shipping coal for domestic use in nearby Centerville. In 1887, the Chicago, Milwaukee and St. Paul Railway built a line through Mystic, leading to an explosive growth in mining. By 1893, there were 14 mines in Mystic and 2 in Brazil, just to the south. It is noteworthy that the terms brass, brazzle and brazil are English dialect terms for pyrite or to coal seams with significant pyrite content and that a shale layer not far above the Mystic coal seam in Mystic and Brazil contains significant pyrite.

Local Assembly 3335 of the Knights of Labor was based in Brazil and had a membership of 75 in 1884. The miners of Mystic and Brazil joined the United Mine Workers in 1898. By 1902, Local 201 in Brazil had 220 members and Local 634 in Mystic had 569 members. By 1912, Local 201 had 370 members and Locals 239 and 634 in Mystic had a combined membership of 851. The total UMWA membership in 1912 represents about 1/4 of the entire population.

In 1914, the Lodwick Brothers Coal Company of Mystic produced over 100,000 tons of coal, ranking among the top 24 coal producers in the state.

== Geography ==
Mystic is located in the valley of Walnut Creek, approximately four miles southwest of its confluence with the Chariton River.

According to the United States Census Bureau, the city has a total area of 2.92 square miles (7.56 km^{2}), all land.

== Demographics ==
Historical population
| Census | Pop. | Note | %± |
|---|---|---|---|
| 1890 | 875 | | — |
| 1900 | 1,758 | | 100.9% |
| 1910 | 2,663 | | 51.5% |
| 1920 | 2,796 | | 5.0% |
| 1930 | 1,953 | | −30.2% |
| 1940 | 1,822 | | −6.7% |
| 1950 | 1,233 | | −32.3% |
| 1960 | 761 | | −38.3% |
| 1970 | 696 | | −8.5% |
| 1980 | 665 | | −4.5% |
| 1990 | 545 | | −18.0% |
| 2000 | 588 | | 7.9% |
| 2010 | 425 | | −27.7% |
| 2020 | 322 | | −24.2% |
U.S. Decennial Census

=== 2020 census ===
As of the census of 2020, there were 322 people, 149 households, and 85 families residing in the city. The population density was 110.7 inhabitants per square mile (42.7/km^{2}). There were 183 housing units at an average density of 62.9 per square mile (24.3/km^{2}). The racial makeup of the city was 96.6% White, 0.0% Black or African American, 1.2% Native American, 0.0% Asian, 0.0% Pacific Islander, 0.0% from other races and 2.2% from two or more races. Hispanic or Latino persons of any race comprised 1.2% of the population.

Of the 149 households, 24.8% of which had children under the age of 18 living with them, 35.6% were married couples living together, 7.4% were cohabitating couples, 27.5% had a female householder with no spouse or partner present and 29.5% had a male householder with no spouse or partner present. 43.0% of all households were non-families. 36.9% of all households were made up of individuals, 17.4% had someone living alone who was 65 years old or older.

The median age in the city was 46.8 years. 21.7% of the residents were under the age of 20; 4.7% were between the ages of 20 and 24; 21.1% were from 25 and 44; 31.1% were from 45 and 64; and 21.4% were 65 years of age or older. The gender makeup of the city was 51.9% male and 48.1% female.

=== 2010 census ===
As of the census of 2010, there were 425 people, 181 households, and 112 families residing in the city. The population density was 145.5 inhabitants per square mile (56.2/km^{2}). There were 210 housing units at an average density of 71.9 per square mile (27.8/km^{2}). The racial makeup of the city was 98.8% White, 0.2% African American, 0.7% from other races, and 0.2% from two or more races. Hispanic or Latino of any race were 1.9% of the population.

There were 181 households, of which 31.5% had children under the age of 18 living with them, 43.1% were married couples living together, 8.3% had a female householder with no husband present, 10.5% had a male householder with no wife present, and 38.1% were non-families. 31.5% of all households were made up of individuals, and 12.1% had someone living alone who was 65 years of age or older. The average household size was 2.35 and the average family size was 2.93.

The median age in the city was 39.9 years. 23.8% of residents were under the age of 18; 5.3% were between the ages of 18 and 24; 27.8% were from 25 to 44; 28.2% were from 45 to 64; and 14.8% were 65 years of age or older. The gender makeup of the city was 51.1% male and 48.9% female.

=== 2000 census ===
As of the census of 2000, there were 588 people, 236 households, and 159 families residing in the city. The population density was 200.7 inhabitants per square mile (77.5/km^{2}). There were 273 housing units at an average density of 93.2 per square mile (36.0/km^{2}). The racial makeup of the city was 99.15% White, 0.17% Native American, and 0.68% from two or more races.

There were 236 households, out of which 32.2% had children under the age of 18 living with them, 55.1% were married couples living together, 7.6% had a female householder with no husband present, and 32.6% were non-families. 25.8% of all households were made up of individuals, and 10.6% had someone living alone who was 65 years of age or older. The average household size was 2.49 and the average family size was 2.99.

In the city, the population was spread out, with 25.3% under the age of 18, 6.1% from 18 to 24, 30.1% from 25 to 44, 24.8% from 45 to 64, and 13.6% who were 65 years of age or older. The median age was 37 years. For every 100 females, there were 101.4 males. For every 100 females age 18 and over, there were 109.0 males.

The median income for a household in the city was $25,568, and the median income for a family was $29,063. Males had a median income of $26,964 versus $18,500 for females. The per capita income for the city was $11,846. About 22.3% of families and 22.9% of the population were below the poverty line, including 25.2% of those under age 18 and 15.7% of those age 65 or over.

== Education ==
The Centerville Community School District operates area public schools.
