= Plano, Iowa =

- City
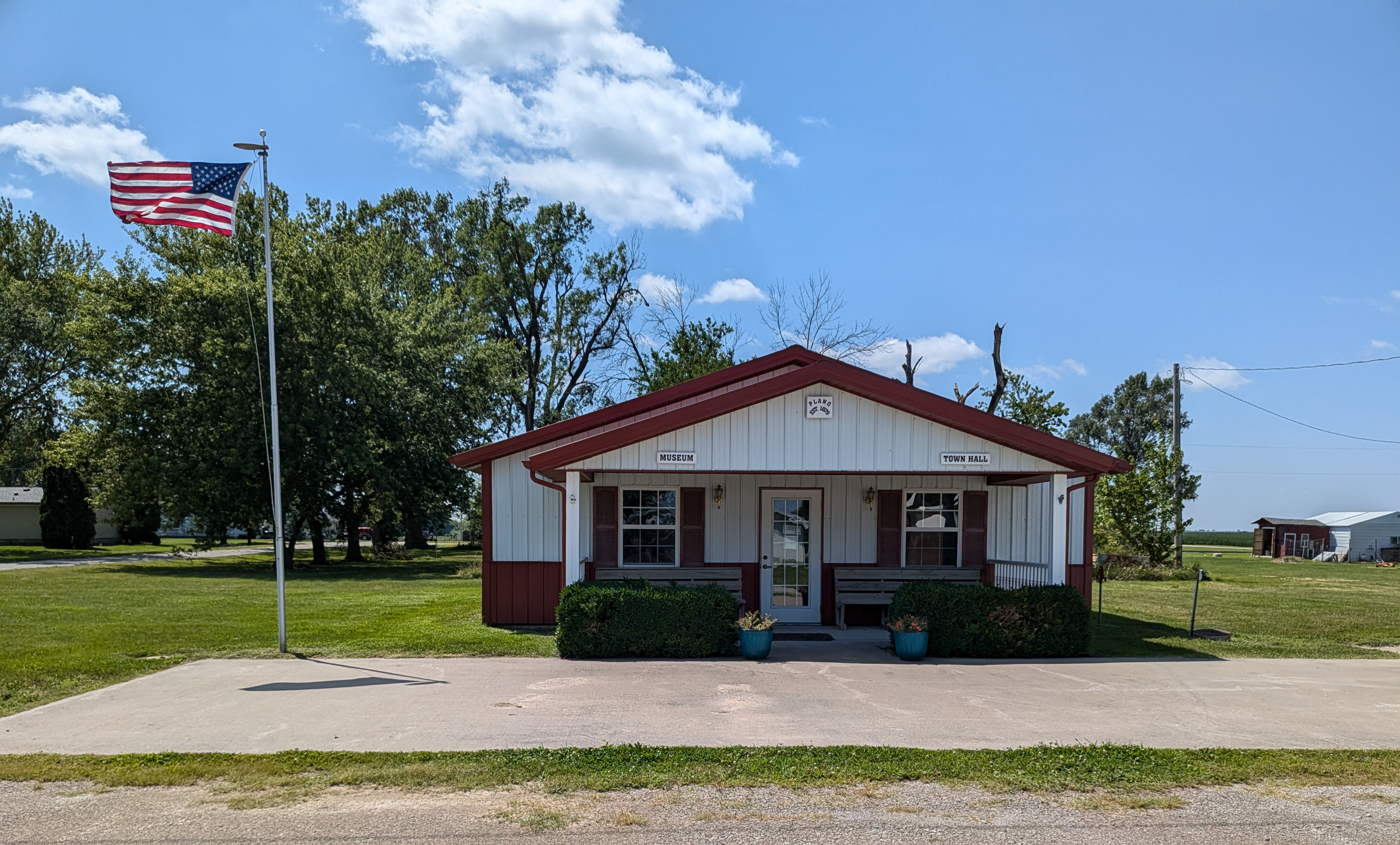
- The museum and town hall of Plano, Iowa

- Location of Plano, Iowa
- Coordinates: 40°45′20″N 93°02′49″W
- Country: US
- State: Iowa
- County: Appanoose

Area
  - Total: 0.56 sq mi (1.46 km^{2})
  - Land: 0.56 sq mi (1.46 km^{2})
  - Water: 0 sq mi (0.00 km^{2})
- Elevation: 1,034 ft (315 m)

Population (2020)
  - Total: 59
  - Density: 105.0/sq mi (40.53/km^{2})
- Time zone: UTC-6 (Central (CST))
  - Summer (DST): UTC-5 (CDT)
- ZIP code: 52581
- Area code: 641
- FIPS code: 19-63345
- GNIS feature ID: 2396224

Plano is a city in Appanoose County, Iowa, United States. The population was 59 at the time of the 2020 census.

== History ==
Plano was incorporated in 1916. A large portion of the early settlers being natives of Plano, Illinois, caused the name to be selected.

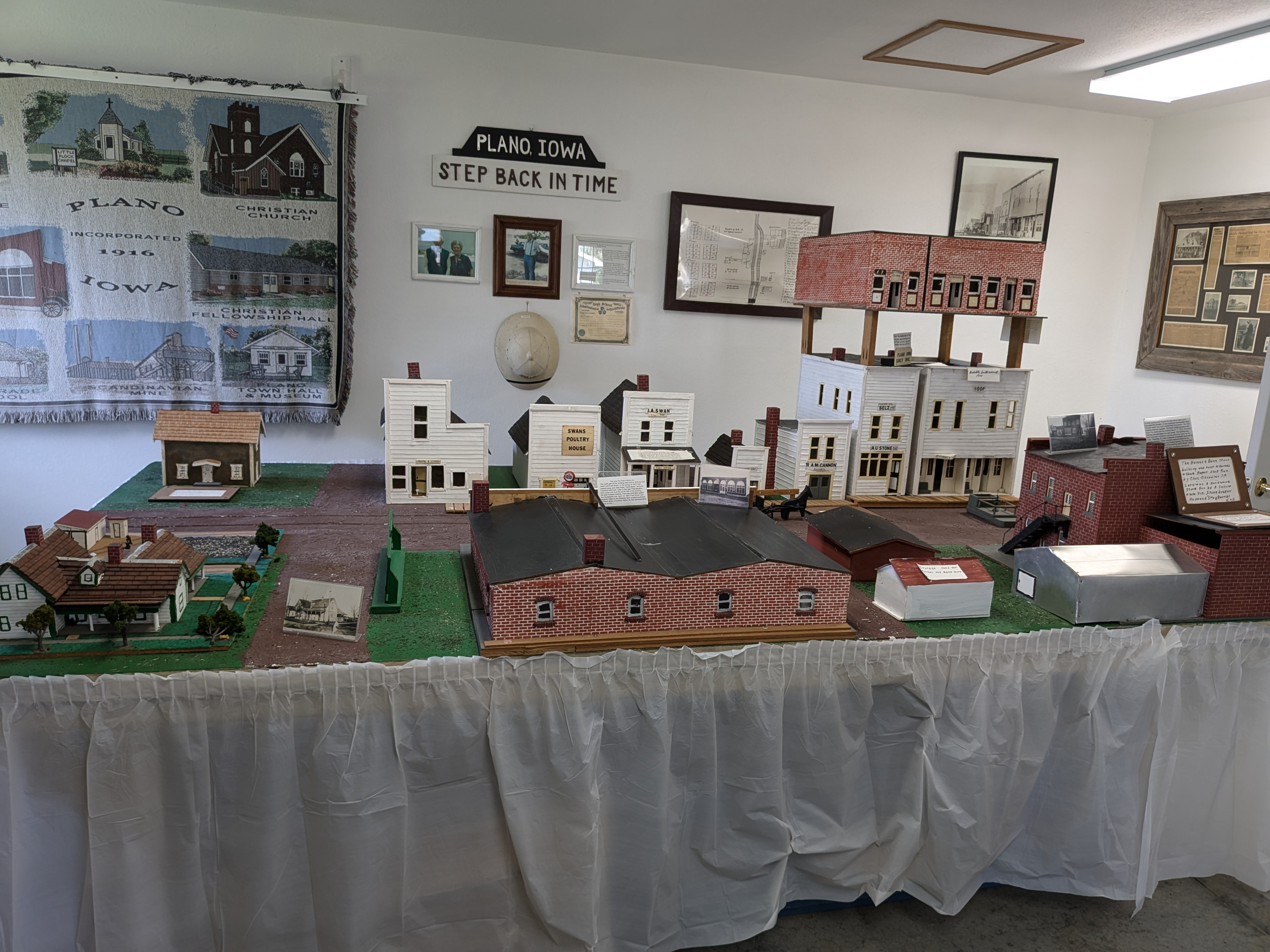
The city museum's model of Plano's business district as it appeared in the early 20th century

The town hall building contains a museum that includes models, constructed from painted cereal boxes, of portions of the town as it appeared in the early 20th century.

== Geography ==
According to the United States Census Bureau, the city has a total area of 0.56 square miles (1.45 km^{2}), all land.

== Demographics ==
Historical populations
Year	Pop.	±%
1920	272	—
1930	153	−43.8%
1940	209	+36.6%
1950	106	−49.3%
1960	87	−17.9%
1970	109	+25.3%
1980	111	+1.8%
1990	75	−32.4%
2000	58	−22.7%
2010	70	+20.7%
2020	59	−15.7%
Source:"U.S. Census website". United States Census Bureau. and Iowa Data Center; Source: U.S. Decennial Census

=== 2020 census ===
As of the census of 2020, there were 59 people, 25 households, and 16 families residing in the city. The population density was 101.9 inhabitants per square mile (39.4/km^{2}). There were 38 housing units at an average density of 65.7 per square mile (25.3/km^{2}). The racial makeup of the city was 88.1% White, 1.7% Black or African American, 0.0% Native American, 5.1% Asian, 0.0% Pacific Islander, 3.4% from other races and 1.7% from two or more races. Hispanic or Latino persons of any race comprised 5.1% of the population.

Of the 25 households, 20.0% of which had children under the age of 18 living with them, 40.0% were married couples living together, 12.0% were cohabitating couples, 32.0% had a female householder with no spouse or partner present and 16.0% had a male householder with no spouse or partner present. 36.0% of all households were non-families. 32.0% of all households were made up of individuals, 20.0% had someone living alone who was 65 years old or older.

The median age in the city was 54.9 years. 20.3% of the residents were under the age of 20; 1.7% were between the ages of 20 and 24; 20.3% were from 25 and 44; 20.3% were from 45 and 64; and 37.3% were 65 years of age or older. The gender makeup of the city was 50.8% male and 49.2% female.

=== 2010 census ===
As of the census of 2010, there were 70 people, 30 households, and 18 families living in the city. The population density was 125.0 inhabitants per square mile (48.3/km^{2}). There were 37 housing units at an average density of 66.1 per square mile (25.5/km^{2}). The racial makeup of the city was 90.0% White, 8.6% African American, and 1.4% from two or more races. Hispanic or Latino of any race were 8.6% of the population.

There were 30 households, of which 23.3% had children under the age of 18 living with them, 46.7% were married couples living together, 6.7% had a female householder with no husband present, 6.7% had a male householder with no wife present, and 40.0% were non-families. 36.7% of all households were made up of individuals, and 26.7% had someone living alone who was 65 years of age or older. The average household size was 2.33 and the average family size was 2.89.

The median age in the city was 39.5 years. 27.1% of residents were under the age of 18; 3% were between the ages of 18 and 24; 21.4% were from 25 to 44; 20% were from 45 to 64; and 28.6% were 65 years of age or older. The gender makeup of the city was 52.9% male and 47.1% female.

=== 2000 census ===
As of the census of 2000, there were 58 people, 29 households, and 20 families living in the city. The population density was 102.7 inhabitants per square mile (39.7/km^{2}). There were 40 housing units at an average density of 70.8 per square mile (27.3/km^{2}). The racial makeup of the city was 94.83% White, and 5.17% from two or more races. Hispanic or Latino of any race were 1.72% of the population.

There were 29 households, out of which 17.2% had children under the age of 18 living with them, 51.7% were married couples living together, 6.9% had a female householder with no husband present, and 31.0% were non-families. 31.0% of all households were made up of individuals, and 10.3% had someone living alone who was 65 years of age or older. The average household size was 2.00 and the average family size was 2.40.

In the city, the population was spread out, with 12.1% under the age of 18, 5.2% from 18 to 24, 15.5% from 25 to 44, 48.3% from 45 to 64, and 19.0% who were 65 years of age or older. The median age was 54 years. For every 100 females, there were 100.0 males. For every 100 females age 18 and over, there were 112.5 males.

The median income for a household in the city was $30,625, and the median income for a family was $33,125. Males had a median income of $28,750 versus $27,000 for females. The per capita income for the city was $22,474. There were 20.0% of families and 23.1% of the population living below the poverty line, including no under eighteens and 13.3% of those over 64.
