= Centerville High School (Iowa) =

Public secondary school in Centerville, Iowa, United States

Location
- 600 CHS Drive; Centerville, Iowa 52544; United States; 40.728757°N 92.8764°W

Information
- Type: Public secondary
- School district: Centerville Community School District
- Principal: Matt Johnson
- Staff: 24.52 FTE
- Grades: 9–12
- Enrollment: 400 (2023-2024)
- Student to teacher ratio: 16.31
- Campus type: Town: Remote
- Colors: Red and Black
- Mascot: Big Reds
- Website: www.centervilleschools.org/centerville-high-school/

Centerville High School is a public high school located in Centerville, Iowa. It is part of the Centerville Community School District and is the home of the Big Reds and Redettes.

The first graduate was Miss Jennie Drake, the daughter of former Iowa Governor Francis Marion Drake.

== Athletics ==
The Big Reds and Redettes are members of the South Central Conference and participate in the following sports:

- Football
- Cross Country
  - Boys' 1979 Class A State Champions
- Volleyball
- Basketball
  - Girls' 2-time State Champions (1935, 1936)
- Wrestling
  - 1988 Class 2A State Champions
- Golf
- Soccer
- Tennis
- Track and Field
  - Boys' 1996 Class 3A State Champions
- Baseball
  - 2-time Class 3A State Champions (1988, 2008)
- Softball

== See also ==
- List of high schools in Iowa
