= Udell, Iowa =

- City
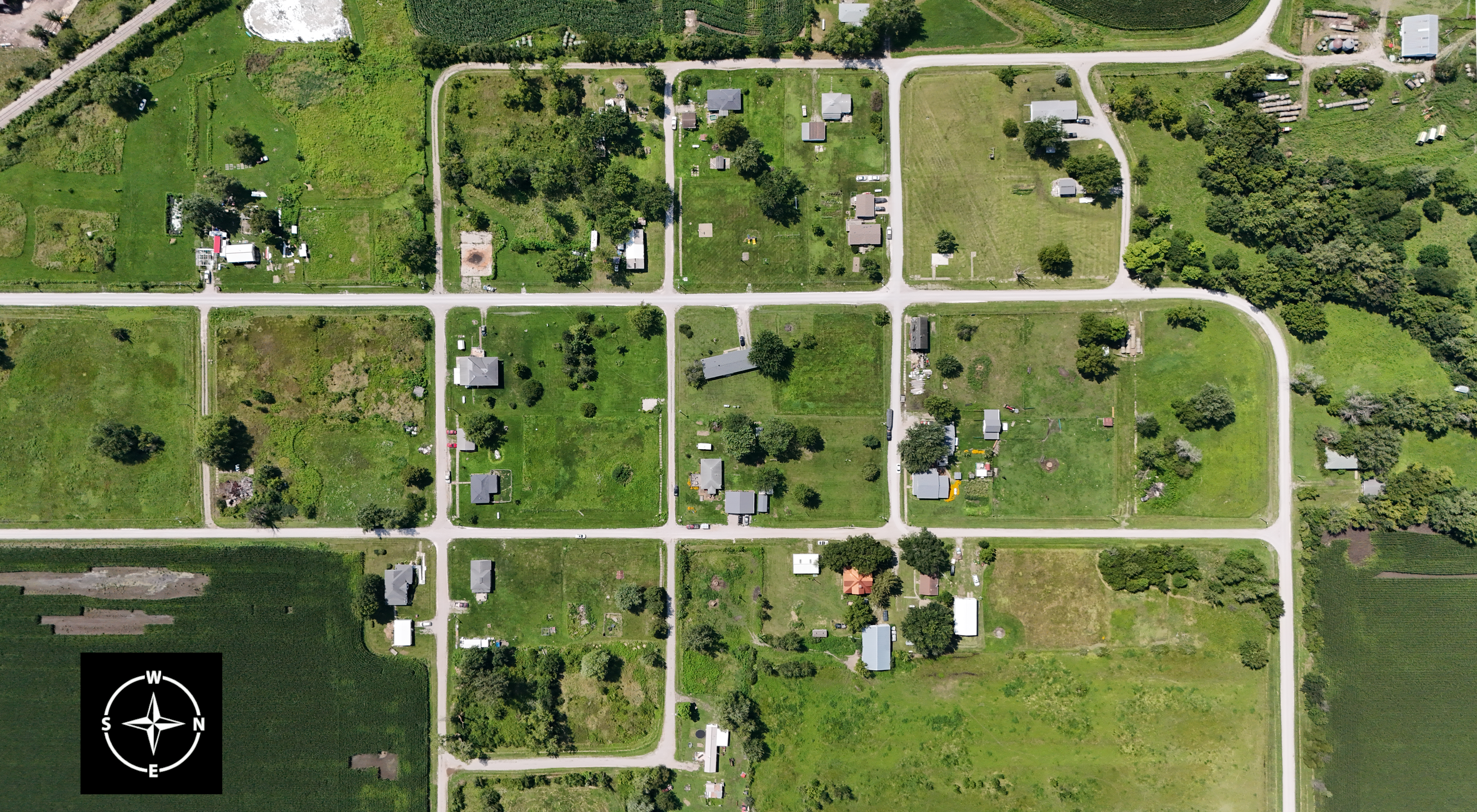
- An aerial image of Udell, Iowa, taken on 4 August 2024

- Location of Udell, Iowa
- Coordinates: 40°46′49″N 92°44′35″W
- Country: US
- State: Iowa
- County: Appanoose

Area
  - Total: 0.28 sq mi (0.73 km^{2})
  - Land: 0.28 sq mi (0.73 km^{2})
  - Water: 0 sq mi (0.00 km^{2})
- Elevation: 994 ft (303 m)

Population (2020)
  - Total: 28
  - Density: 99.6/sq mi (38.45/km^{2})
- Time zone: UTC-6 (Central (CST))
  - Summer (DST): UTC-5 (CDT)
- ZIP code: 52593
- Area code: 641
- FIPS code: 19-79410
- GNIS feature ID: 2397078

Udell is a city in Appanoose County, Iowa, United States. The population was 28 at the time of the 2020 census.

== History ==
Udell was founded in 1895. It was named for Dr. Nathan Udell, a pioneer settler.

== Geography ==
According to the United States Census Bureau, the city has a total area of 0.32 square miles (0.83 km^{2}), all land.

== Demographics ==
Historical populations
Year	Pop.	±%
1910	186	—
1920	214	+15.1%
1930	151	−29.4%
1940	137	−9.3%
1950	96	−29.9%
1960	76	−20.8%
1970	71	−6.6%
1980	75	+5.6%
1990	76	+1.3%
2000	58	−23.7%
2010	47	−19.0%
2020	28	−40.4%
Source:"U.S. Census website". United States Census Bureau. and Iowa Data Center; Source: U.S. Decennial Census

=== 2020 census ===
As of the census of 2020, there were 28 people, 12 households, and 11 families residing in the city. The population density was 101.5 inhabitants per square mile (39.2/km^{2}). There were 19 housing units at an average density of 68.9 per square mile (26.6/km^{2}). The racial makeup of the city was 100.0% White, 0.0% Black or African American, 0.0% Native American, 0.0% Asian, 0.0% Pacific Islander, 0.0% from other races and 0.0% from two or more races. Hispanic or Latino persons of any race comprised 0.0% of the population.

Of the 12 households, 41.7% of which had children under the age of 18 living with them, 50.0% were married couples living together, 0.0% were cohabitating couples, 25.0% had a female householder with no spouse or partner present and 25.0% had a male householder with no spouse or partner present. 8.3% of all households were non-families. 8.3% of all households were made up of individuals, 0.0% had someone living alone who was 65 years old or older.

The median age in the city was 51.0 years. 14.3% of the residents were under the age of 20; 3.6% were between the ages of 20 and 24; 25.0% were from 25 and 44; 28.6% were from 45 and 64; and 28.6% were 65 years of age or older. The gender makeup of the city was 64.3% male and 35.7% female.

=== 2010 census ===
As of the census of 2010, there were 47 people, 21 households, and 13 families living in the city. The population density was 146.9 inhabitants per square mile (56.7/km^{2}). There were 26 housing units at an average density of 81.3 per square mile (31.4/km^{2}). The racial makeup of the city was 95.7% White, 2.1% from other races, and 2.1% from two or more races. Hispanic or Latino of any race were 2.1% of the population.

There were 21 households, of which 19.0% had children under the age of 18 living with them, 52.4% were married couples living together, 9.5% had a male householder with no wife present, and 38.1% were non-families. 28.6% of all households were made up of individuals, and 9.5% had someone living alone who was 65 years of age or older. The average household size was 2.24 and the average family size was 2.46.

The median age in the city was 41.5 years. 21.3% of residents were under the age of 18; 6.4% were between the ages of 18 and 24; 23.4% were from 25 to 44; 17% were from 45 to 64; and 31.9% were 65 years of age or older. The gender makeup of the city was 57.4% male and 42.6% female.

=== 2000 census ===
As of the census of 2000, there were 58 people, 21 households, and 17 families living in the city. The population density was 183.0 inhabitants per square mile (70.7/km^{2}). There were 24 housing units at an average density of 75.7 per square mile (29.2/km^{2}). The racial makeup of the city was 91.38% White, 3.45% Asian, 5.17% from other races. Hispanic or Latino of any race were 3.45% of the population.

There were 21 households, out of which 33.3% had children under the age of 18 living with them, 61.9% were married couples living together, 19.0% had a female householder with no husband present, and 19.0% were non-families. 19.0% of all households were made up of individuals, and 4.8% had someone living alone who was 65 years of age or older. The average household size was 2.76 and the average family size was 3.18.

In the city, the population was spread out, with 34.5% under the age of 18, 3.4% from 18 to 24, 25.9% from 25 to 44, 24.1% from 45 to 64, and 12.1% who were 65 years of age or older. The median age was 35 years. For every 100 females, there were 114.8 males. For every 100 females age 18 and over, there were 111.1 males.

The median income for a household in the city was $24,688, and the median income for a family was $28,750. Males had a median income of $33,750 versus $20,000 for females. The per capita income for the city was $7,294. There were 16.7% of families and 15.3% of the population living below the poverty line, including 16.7% of under eighteens and none of those over 64.
