= Appanoose County, Iowa =

County in Iowa, United States

- County
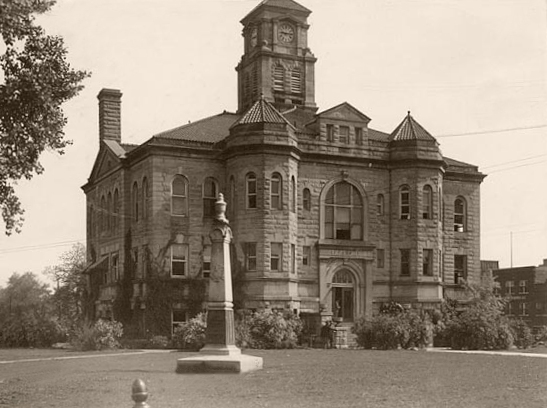
- Appanoose County Courthouse

- Location within the U.S. state of Iowa
- Coordinates: 40°44′17″N 92°52′02″W
- Country: United States
- State: Iowa
- Founded: 1843
- Named for: Chief Appanoose
- Seat: Centerville
- Largest city: Centerville

Area
  - Total: 516 sq mi (1,340 km^{2})
  - Land: 497 sq mi (1,290 km^{2})
  - Water: 19 sq mi (49 km^{2}) 3.7%

Population (2020)
  - Total: 12,317
  - Estimate (2025): 12,077 ▼
  - Density: 24.8/sq mi (9.57/km^{2})
- Time zone: UTC−6 (Central)
  - Summer (DST): UTC−5 (CDT)
- Congressional district: 3rd
- Website: appanoosecounty.iowa.gov
- Iowa county number 04

Appanoose County is a county in the U.S. state of Iowa. As of the 2020 census, the population was 12,317. Its county seat is Centerville.

== History ==
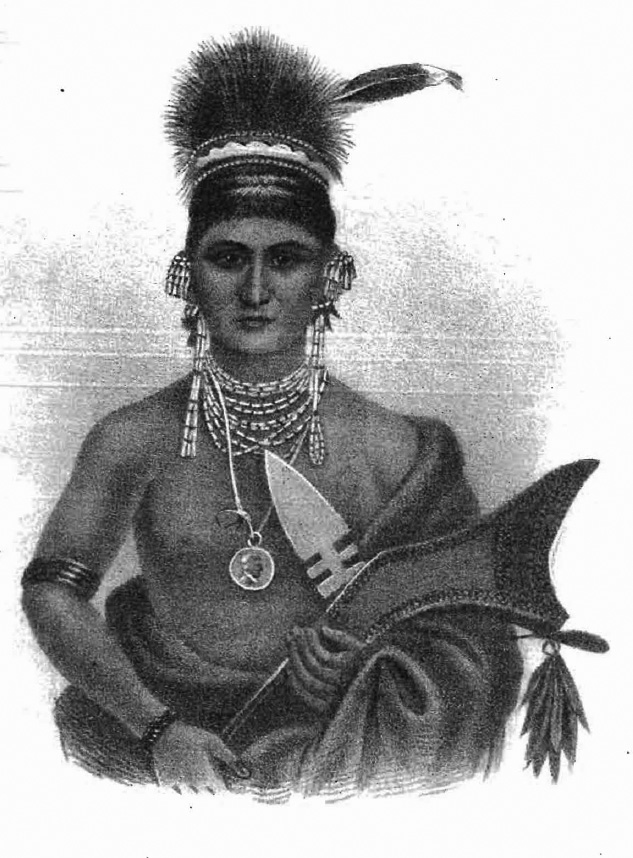
Chief Appanoose, from A.R. Fulton's Red Men of Iowa 1882.

Appanoose County was formed on February 17, 1843, from open territory. It was named for the Meskwaki Chief Appanoose, who did not engage in war against Black Hawk, advocating peace. The present county seat was formerly called Chaldea, and was later renamed to Senterville in honor of Congressman William Tandy Senter of Tennessee. In April 1848, the courthouse, constructed at the expense of $160, was put into use and served as such until 1857. The second courthouse was opened in 1864, and was burned down to the first floor during an explosive Fourth of July fireworks demonstration. The third courthouse was dedicated on May 21, 1903, and remains in use.

In the summer of 1832 a company of cavalry set out from Davenport on a reconnaissance which extended as far west as Fort Leavenworth. They passed through what would become Appanoose County in a nearly southwest direction, passing near the present city of Moulton, camping overnight at a spring southwest of Cincinnati, and leaving the area and crossing into Missouri near the southwest corner of Pleasant Township. Early settlers in search of claims found two trails. The route taken by the cavalrymen and another with a general north–south direction, passing through Washington Township, and known as the bee trace and used in the summer by honey collectors. A post office in Washington Township was called Beetrace. The Beetrace post office was discontinued on March 1, 1886. This may have been originally an Indian trail. The first settlers say that it was a tolerably well-defined wagon road as far north as the Beetrace post office and that it could be followed easily into Taylor Township. Another "bee-trace" ran from Missouri diagonally through Davis County and terminated near Unionville.

== Geography ==
According to the U.S. Census Bureau, the county has a total area of 516 square miles (1,340 km^{2}), of which 497 square miles (1,290 km^{2}) is land and 19 square miles (49 km^{2}) (3.7%) is water. Rathbun Reservoir, created by damming the Chariton River, is its main physical feature.

=== Major highways ===
- Iowa Highway 2
- Iowa Highway 5
- Iowa Highway 202

=== Adjacent counties ===
- Monroe County (north)
- Wapello County (northeast)
- Lucas County (northwest)
- Davis County (east)
- Schuyler County, Missouri (southeast)
- Putnam County, Missouri (southwest)
- Wayne County (west)

== Demographics ==
Historical population
Census	Pop.	Note	%±
1850	3,131		—
1860	11,931		281.1%
1870	16,456		37.9%
1880	16,636		1.1%
1890	18,961		14.0%
1900	25,927		36.7%
1910	28,701		10.7%
1920	30,535		6.4%
1930	24,835		−18.7%
1940	24,245		−2.4%
1950	19,683		−18.8%
1960	16,015		−18.6%
1970	15,007		−6.3%
1980	15,511		3.4%
1990	13,743		−11.4%
2000	13,721		−0.2%
2010	12,884		−6.1%
2020	12,317		−4.4%
2025 (est.)	12,077	▼	−1.9%
U.S. Decennial Census; 1790-1960 1900-1990; 1990-2000 2010-2018

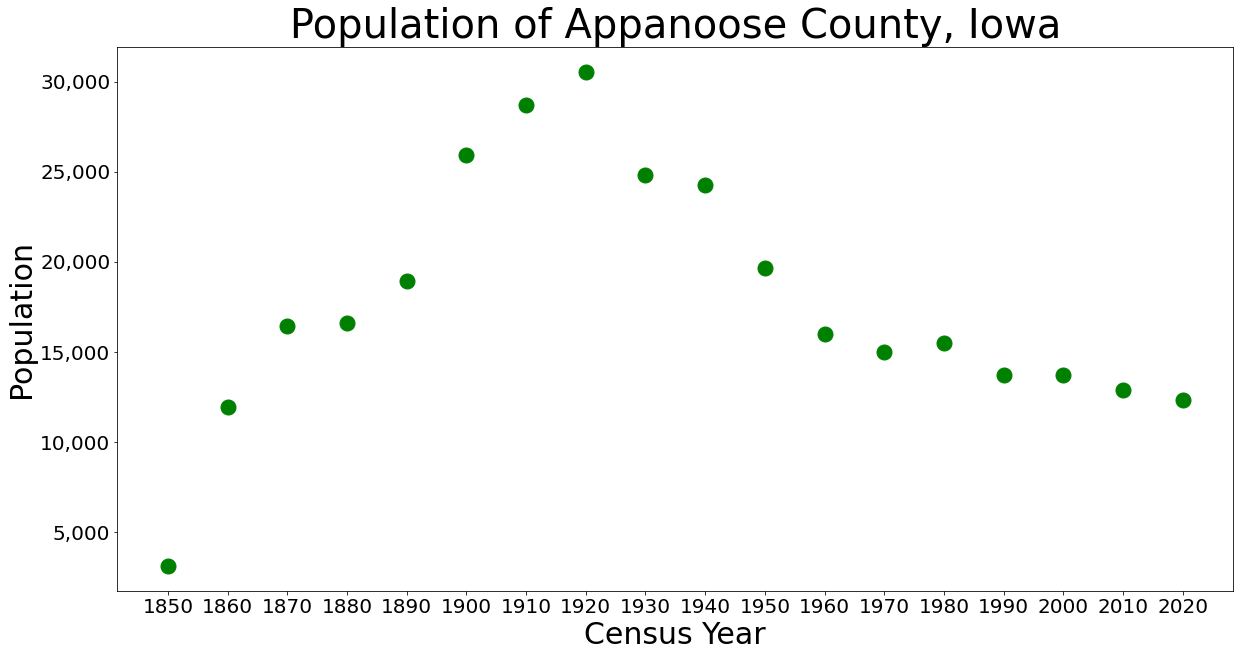
Population of Appanoose County from US census data

=== 2020 census ===
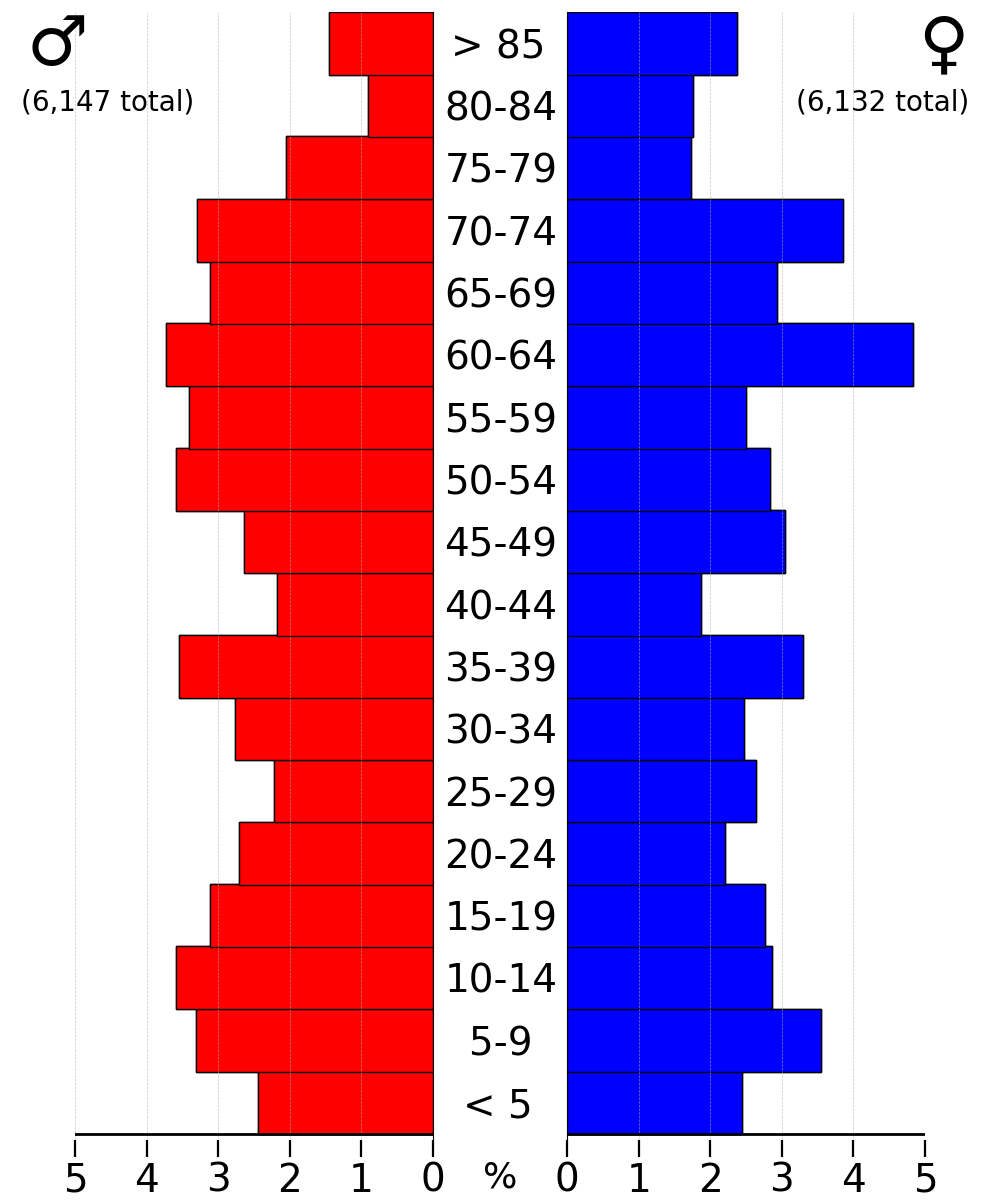
2022 US Census population pyramid for Appanoose County from ACS 5-year estimates

As of the 2020 census, the county had a population of 12,317 and a population density of 23.8/sq mi (9.2/km^{2}). The median age was 45.4 years, with 22.0% of residents under the age of 18 and 23.8% of residents 65 years of age or older. For every 100 females there were 97.4 males, and for every 100 females age 18 and over there were 94.6 males age 18 and over.

The racial makeup of the county was 94.9% White, 0.6% Black or African American, 0.2% American Indian and Alaska Native, 0.6% Asian, 0.1% Native Hawaiian and Pacific Islander, 0.3% from some other race, and 3.3% from two or more races. Hispanic or Latino residents of any race comprised 1.9% of the population.

42.8% of residents lived in urban areas, while 57.2% lived in rural areas.

There were 5,320 households in the county, of which 25.3% had children under the age of 18 living in them. Of all households, 46.3% were married-couple households, 19.6% were households with a male householder and no spouse or partner present, and 27.0% were households with a female householder and no spouse or partner present. About 32.8% of all households were made up of individuals and 15.9% had someone living alone who was 65 years of age or older.

Of the 6,306 housing units, 5,320 were occupied and 15.6% were vacant. Among occupied housing units, 72.3% were owner-occupied and 27.7% were renter-occupied. The homeowner vacancy rate was 2.1% and the rental vacancy rate was 12.9%.

=== 2010 census ===
The 2010 census recorded a population of 12,884 in the county, with a population density of 26.0/sq mi (10.0/km^{2}). There were 6,633 housing units, of which 5,627 were occupied.

=== 2000 census ===
At the 2000 census there were 13,721 people, 5,779 households, and 3,802 families in the county. The population density was 28 people per square mile (11 people/km^{2}). There were 6,697 housing units at an average density of 14 units per square mile (5.4 units/km^{2}). The racial makeup of the county was 98.16% White, 0.42% Black or African American, 0.17% Native American, 0.26% Asian, 0.01% Pacific Islander, 0.27% from other races, and 0.71% from two or more races. 0.98%. were Hispanic or Latino of any race.

Of the 5,779 households 28.40% had children under the age of 18 living with them, 53.10% were married couples living together, 8.80% had a female householder with no husband present, and 34.20% were non-families. 29.90% of households were one person and 15.40% were one person aged 65 or older. The average household size was 2.34 and the average family size was 2.89.

23.70% of the people are under the age of 18, 7.80% from 18 to 24, 25.10% from 25 to 44, 23.50% from 45 to 64, and 20.00% 65 or older. The median age was 41 years. For every 100 females there were 91.50 males. For every 100 females age 18 and over, there were 89.50 males.

The median household income was $28,612 and the median family income was $35,980. Males had a median income of $27,449 versus $20,452 for females. The per capita income for the county was $14,644. About 10.10% of families and 14.50% of the population were below the poverty line, including 16.00% of those under age 18 and 14.10% of those age 65 or over.

== Communities ==
=== Cities ===
- Centerville
- Cincinnati
- Exline
- Moravia
- Moulton
- Mystic
- Numa
- Plano
- Rathbun
- Udell
- Unionville

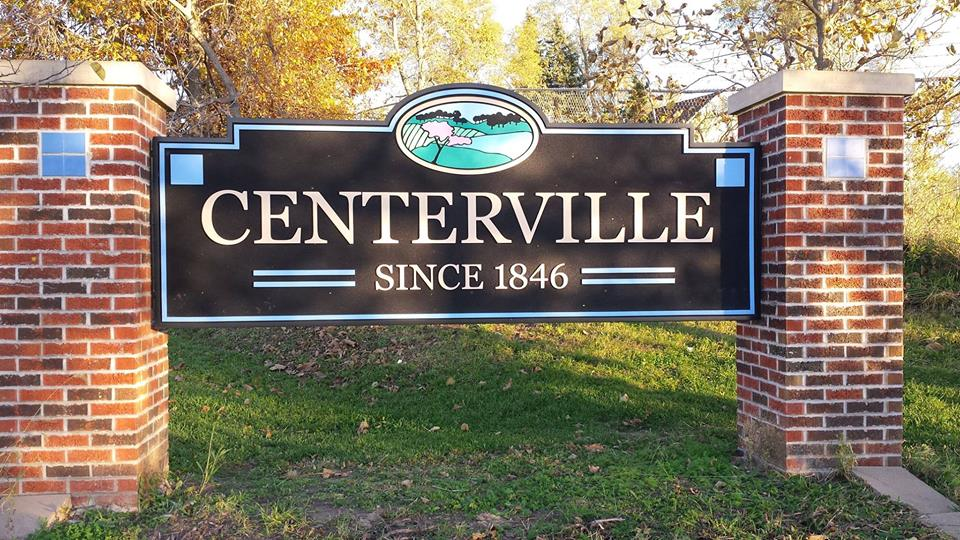
Centerville Iowa East Entrance Sign

=== Townships ===
Appanoose County is divided into seventeen townships:

- Bellair
- Caldwell
- Chariton
- Douglas
- Franklin
- Independence
- Johns
- Lincoln
- Pleasant
- Sharon
- Taylor
- Udell
- Union
- Vermillion
- Walnut
- Washington
- Wells

=== Population ranking ===
The population ranking of the following table is based on the 2020 census of Appanoose County.

† county seat

Rank	City/Town/etc.	Municipal type	Population (2020 Census)	Population (2024 Estimate)
1	† Centerville	City	5,412	5,382
2	Moravia (partially in Monroe County)	City	636 (637 total)	631 (632 total)
3	Moulton	City	607	602
4	Mystic	City	322	314
5	Cincinnati	City	290	285
6	Exline	City	160	154
7	Unionville	City	75	74
8	Numa	City	68	54
10	Plano	City	59	49
9	Rathbun	City	43	32
11	Udell	City	28	24

== Politics ==
United States presidential election results for Appanoose County, Iowa
Year	Republican		Democratic		Third party(ies)	
Year	No.	%	No.	%	No.	%
1896	3,046	50.54%	2,940	48.78%	41	0.68%
1900	3,538	55.52%	2,690	42.21%	145	2.28%
1904	3,607	59.86%	1,743	28.92%	676	11.22%
1908	3,161	55.00%	2,167	37.71%	419	7.29%
1912	2,356	40.57%	2,058	35.44%	1,393	23.99%
1916	3,327	52.43%	2,510	39.55%	509	8.02%
1920	6,382	65.50%	2,952	30.30%	409	4.20%
1924	6,421	57.14%	2,032	18.08%	2,785	24.78%
1928	6,864	66.72%	3,340	32.47%	83	0.81%
1932	4,229	42.22%	5,519	55.10%	269	2.69%
1936	5,511	45.16%	6,599	54.08%	93	0.76%
1940	6,032	49.43%	6,069	49.74%	101	0.83%
1944	4,928	49.18%	5,015	50.05%	77	0.77%
1948	4,078	43.87%	4,998	53.77%	220	2.37%
1952	5,429	55.38%	4,276	43.61%	99	1.01%
1956	4,980	55.00%	4,064	44.89%	10	0.11%
1960	5,040	59.43%	3,422	40.35%	18	0.21%
1964	2,872	36.56%	4,960	63.14%	24	0.31%
1968	3,497	49.58%	3,005	42.61%	551	7.81%
1972	4,321	64.04%	2,283	33.84%	143	2.12%
1976	3,036	46.29%	3,424	52.21%	98	1.49%
1980	3,544	52.68%	2,769	41.16%	415	6.17%
1984	3,412	50.48%	3,289	48.66%	58	0.86%
1988	2,779	45.65%	3,209	52.71%	100	1.64%
1992	2,346	36.81%	2,810	44.09%	1,217	19.10%
1996	2,233	39.93%	2,747	49.12%	612	10.94%
2000	2,992	52.45%	2,560	44.88%	152	2.66%
2004	3,340	51.78%	3,063	47.49%	47	0.73%
2008	3,086	49.94%	2,970	48.07%	123	1.99%
2012	3,161	50.62%	2,951	47.25%	133	2.13%
2016	4,033	65.73%	1,814	29.56%	289	4.71%
2020	4,512	69.24%	1,891	29.02%	113	1.73%
2024	4,704	72.55%	1,686	26.00%	94	1.45%

== Education ==
School districts covering portions of the county include:

- Albia Community School District
- Centerville Community School District
- Moravia Community School District
- Moulton-Udell Community School District
- Seymour Community School District

== See also ==
- National Register of Historic Places listings in Appanoose County, Iowa
- The Appanoose County Courthouse Article
