= Pleasant Grove Township, Floyd County, Iowa =

Pleasant Grove Township
- Township
- Location in Floyd County
- Coordinates: 42°57′00″N 92°43′47″W
- Country: United States
- State: Iowa
- County: Floyd

Area
  - Total: 35.87 sq mi (92.89 km^{2})
  - Land: 35.87 sq mi (92.89 km^{2})
  - Water: 0 sq mi (0 km^{2}) 0%
- Elevation: 1,037 ft (316 m)

Population (2000)
  - Total: 213
  - Density: 6.0/sq mi (2.3/km^{2})
- Time zone: UTC-6 (CST)
  - Summer (DST): UTC-5 (CDT)
- ZIP codes: 50616, 50636, 50653
- GNIS feature ID: 0468539

Pleasant Grove Township is one of twelve townships in Floyd County, Iowa, USA. As of the 2000 census, its population was 213.

== Geography ==
According to the United States Census Bureau, Pleasant Grove Township covers an area of 35.87 square miles (92.89 square kilometers).

=== Unincorporated towns ===
- Powersville at 42.936363°N 92.687135°W

(This list is based on USGS data and may include former settlements.)

=== Adjacent townships ===
- Saint Charles Township (northeast)
- Riverton Township (east)
- Fremont Township, Butler County (southeast)
- Dayton Township, Butler County (south)
- Coldwater Township, Butler County (southwest)
- Union Township (west)

=== Cemeteries ===
The township contains Pleasant Grove Cemetery.

== School districts ==
- Charles City Community School District
- Greene Community School District

== Political districts ==
- Iowa's 4th congressional district
- State House District 14
- State Senate District 7
