= Parks in Floyd County, Iowa =

Floyd County, Iowa has 18 county parks that are managed by the Floyd County Conservation Board. There are two wildlife management areas that are managed by the Iowa DNR, Idlewild WMA and Restoration Marsh WMA. There are also 22 parks that are managed by local municipalities.

Activities at county parks include camping, hiking, bicycling, fishing, hunting, canoeing, kayaking, horseback riding, environmental education, fossil hunting, and more.

Fishing is allowed in public locations along the Cedar River, Flood Creek, Little Cedar River, Rudd Lake, Shell Rock River and Winnebago River. A fishing license is required to fish in the state of Iowa. Check local and state regulations before fishing.

Name	Location	Camping	Hiking	Fishing	Management	Coord	Summary
Ackley Creek Park	Marble Rock	Y	Y		County	42.951239°N 92.879448°W	40 acres, 24 electric sites with water, a restroom/shower house, two picnic shelters, a playground and hiking trails
Charles City parks	Charles City		Y	Y	Town		Fishing is permitted within Charles City city limits. Public land stretches along the north side of the river, from Flora Ellis Park (1/2 block west of Riverside Ave. & Howard St, on Riverside Ave.) to Merten J. Klaus Park (end of Maple Ave.). Fishing is also allowed on the south side of the river from Sherman Park to Bayou Bend Park and Grace Larson Park to St. Mary's Park, near McDonald's.
Charles City WhiteWater at Riverfront Park	Charles City				Town		Whitewater kayaking and access for canoes
Charley Western Recreational Trailway	Charles City		Y	Y	Town		Bicycle/hiking trail, runs approximately 5.2 miles through and around Charles City, portions along the Cedar River, part is a rail trail of the former Charley Western Railroad
Colwell Park	Colwell	Y	Y	Y	County	43.156044°N 92.588824°W	19 acres, features free primitive camping areas and pit toilets, and a playground. Access to Little Cedar River.
East Idlewild Park	Floyd		Y		Iowa DNR	43.169470°N 92.75238°W	Parking at south trailhead is located at intersection of Ocean Avenue and 130th Street, hiking is possible along old road that leads to Cedar River.
East Park and Rudd Lake	Rudd	Y	Y	Y	County	43.126031°N 92.889150°W	12 acres, campsites with grills, playground, shelter, paved trails, fishing jetty. Bicycle/hiking trail, trailhead is located at beach parking lot, one lap around lake equals 9/10 mile.
Edna Pelz Wildlife Area	Charles City			Y	County	43.134768°N 92.625346°W	24 acres, access to Little Cedar River
Fossil & Prairie Park	Rockford		Y		County	43.047255°N 92.978759°W	Features hiking trails through native prairies, a fossil quarry where visitors can collect Devonian fossils and a nature center for environmental education.
Gates Bridge Access	Greene	Y	Y	Y	County	42.935203°N 92.850764°W	A free primitive camping area with six sites, allows canoers and boaters access to the Shell Rock River.
George Wyatt Park & Campgrounds	Rockford	Y	Y	Y	Town	43.156044°N 92.588824°W	Features 24 campsites with trailer dump and showers, a boat ramp available and fishing.
Happy Acres	Marble Rock		Y	Y	County	43.017058°N 92.823830°W	40 acres, access to Flood Creek
Howard's Woods Recreation Area	Nashua	Y	Y	Y	County	42.984275°N 92.561256°W	20 acres, managed by Chickasaw County Conservation Board. Primitive camping, hiking, river fishing, shelter, woodland.
Joney Laudner Family Nature Preserve	Rockford				County	43.045564°N 92.998702°W	Recreated prairie pothole, attracts waterfowl in spring and fall migration season
Koebrick Wildlife Area	Marble Rock			Y	County	42.996863°N 92.809925°W	40 acres, access to Flood Creek
Marble Rock City Park	Marble Rock	Y		Y	Town	42.967387°N 92.869413°W	10 acres, access to Shell Rock River, camping with electrical hookup
Mathers Woods	Nora Springs	Y	Y		Town	43.132322°N 92.991556°W	Nature preserve, trail follows old road towards Shell Rock River
River Road Canoe Launch	Floyd			Y	County	43.208246°N 92.788080°W	Cedar River access, parking at canoe launch point northeast of River Road Bridge
Rockford Public Access	Rockford		Y		Town	43.049169°N 92.948670°W	Access to Winnebago River at south end of 2nd St. Southwest, fishing best done by canoe.
Rotary Park	Floyd		Y	Y	County	43.1164289°N 92.706542°W 43.116428915878465,-92.70654201507568	Cedar River access, parking at canoe launch point northeast of River Road Bridge, picnic shelter
Rotary Wildlife Area	Floyd				County	43.118200°N 92.706028°W	
Shell Rock River City Park	Nora Springs			Y	Town	43.132322°N 92.991556°W	Access to Shell Rock River, dam, located at west end of 6th St NW.
South Hawkeye Avenue Bridge	Nora Springs		Y		Town	43.138010°N 93.006617°W	Access to Shell Rock River, parking at the end of S. Hawkeye Ave. or on other side of bridge, public fishing is allowed on south side of river.
Tosanak Recreation Area	Marble Rock	Y	Y		County	42.988399°N 92.894368°W	370 acres, access to Shell Rock River, reservable cabins, lodges and picnic shelters, also primitive camping
Trowbridge Marsh	Charles City		Y		Town	43.075571°N 92.695050°W	Wetland habitat
Wentlands Woods	Floyd		Y		County	43.141660°N 92.707053°W	102 acres of forest, trailhead is at the parking area near Quail Ave and 150th St., hiking trail is crushed limestone that circles the park, seasonal hunting
West Idlewild Park	Floyd	Y	Y	Y	County	43.163345°N 92.753687°W	50 acres, primitive camping along the Cedar River, activities include bird watching, canoeing, fishing, hiking, and picnicking.
Winterink Woods	Charles City		Y		County	43.026983°N 92.618548°W	40 acre wooded hunting area, parking is north of the intersection of Utopia Ave and 227th St. on Utopia Ave.
