= Riverton Township, Iowa =

Riverton Township may refer to the following places in the U.S. state of Iowa:

- Riverton Township, Clay County, Iowa
- Riverton Township, Floyd County, Iowa
- Riverton Township, Fremont County, Iowa

== See also ==
- Riverton Township (disambiguation)
