= Niles Township, Floyd County, Iowa =

Niles Township
- Township
- Location in Floyd County
- Coordinates: 43°07′25″N 92°36′47″W
- Country: United States
- State: Iowa
- County: Floyd

Area
  - Total: 34.60 sq mi (89.62 km^{2})
  - Land: 34.60 sq mi (89.62 km^{2})
  - Water: 0 sq mi (0 km^{2}) 0%
- Elevation: 1,033 ft (315 m)

Population (2000)
  - Total: 533
  - Density: 15/sq mi (5.9/km^{2})
- Time zone: UTC-6 (CST)
  - Summer (DST): UTC-5 (CDT)
- ZIP codes: 50616, 50645
- GNIS feature ID: 0468442

Niles Township is one of twelve townships in Floyd County, Iowa, United States. As of the 2000 census, its population was 533.

== Geography ==
According to the United States Census Bureau, Niles Township covers an area of 34.6 square miles (89.62 square kilometers).

=== Cities, towns, villages ===
- Colwell

=== Unincorporated towns ===
- Doubleday at 43.086362°N 92.633521°W
- Nilesville at 43.140528°N 92.613519°W

(This list is based on USGS data and may include former settlements.)

=== Adjacent townships ===
- Deerfield Township, Chickasaw County (east)
- Chickasaw Township, Chickasaw County (southeast)
- Saint Charles Township (southwest)
- Floyd Township (west)
- Cedar Township (northwest)

=== Cemeteries ===
The township contains Beckwith Cemetery.

=== Landmarks ===
- Colwell County Park

== School districts ==
- Charles City Community School District

== Political districts ==
- Iowa's 4th congressional district
- State House District 14
- State Senate District 7
