= Floyd Township, Floyd County, Iowa =

Floyd Township
- Township
- Location in Floyd County
- Coordinates: 43°08′52″N 92°45′27″W
- Country: United States
- State: Iowa
- County: Floyd

Area
  - Total: 42.34 sq mi (109.67 km^{2})
  - Land: 42.34 sq mi (109.67 km^{2})
  - Water: 0 sq mi (0 km^{2}) 0%
- Elevation: 1,070 ft (326 m)

Population (2000)
  - Total: 1,032
  - Density: 24/sq mi (9.4/km^{2})
- Time zone: UTC-6 (CST)
  - Summer (DST): UTC-5 (CDT)
- ZIP codes: 50435, 50616
- GNIS feature ID: 0467837

Floyd Township is one of twelve townships in Floyd County, Iowa, United States. As of the 2000 census, its population was 1,032.

== Geography ==
According to the United States Census Bureau, Floyd Township covers an area of 42.35 square miles (109.67 square kilometers).

=== Cities, towns, villages ===
- Floyd

=== Unincorporated towns ===
- Floyd Crossing at 43.091083°N 92.742137°W

(This list is based on USGS data and may include former settlements.)

=== Adjacent townships ===
- West Lincoln Township, Mitchell County (north)
- Cedar Township (northeast)
- Niles Township (east)
- Saint Charles Township (southeast)
- Ulster Township (southwest)
- Rudd Township (west)
- Cedar Township, Mitchell County (northwest)

=== Cemeteries ===
The township contains Oakwood Cemetery.

=== Major highways ===
- U.S. Route 18
- U.S. Route 218

=== Landmarks ===
- Idlewild State Park

== School districts ==
- Charles City Community School District
- Osage Community School District

== Political districts ==
- Iowa's 4th congressional district
- State House District 14
- State Senate District 7
