= Rudd Township, Floyd County, Iowa =

Rudd Township
- Township
- Location in Floyd County
- Coordinates: 43°09′45″N 92°51′36″W
- Country: United States
- State: Iowa
- County: Floyd

Area
  - Total: 35.24 sq mi (91.28 km^{2})
  - Land: 35.24 sq mi (91.28 km^{2})
  - Water: 0 sq mi (0 km^{2}) 0%
- Elevation: 1,150 ft (350 m)

Population (2000)
  - Total: 693
  - Density: 20/sq mi (7.6/km^{2})
- Time zone: UTC-6 (CST)
  - Summer (DST): UTC-5 (CDT)
- ZIP codes: 50435, 50461, 50471
- GNIS feature ID: 0468646

Rudd Township is one of twelve townships in Floyd County, Iowa, USA. As of the 2000 census, its population was 693.

== Geography ==
According to the United States Census Bureau, Rudd Township covers an area of 35.24 square miles (91.28 square kilometers).

=== Cities, towns, villages ===
- Rudd

=== Adjacent townships ===
- Floyd Township (east)
- Ulster Township (south)
- Rockford Township (southwest)
- Rock Grove Township (west)
- Cedar Township, Mitchell County (northwest)

=== Cemeteries ===
The township contains Evergreen Cemetery.

=== Major highways ===
- U.S. Route 18

=== Airports and landing strips ===
- Folkerts Airport

== School districts ==
- Osage Community School District
- Rudd-Rockford-Marble Rock Community School District

== Political districts ==
- Iowa's 4th congressional district
- State House District 14
- State Senate District 7
