= Cedar Township, Floyd County, Iowa =

Cedar Township
- Township
- Location in Floyd County
- Coordinates: 43°11′27″N 92°39′14″W
- Country: United States
- State: Iowa
- County: Floyd

Area
  - Total: 31.87 sq mi (82.54 km^{2})
  - Land: 31.87 sq mi (82.54 km^{2})
  - Water: 0 sq mi (0 km^{2}) 0%
- Elevation: 1,135 ft (346 m)

Population (2000)
  - Total: 305
  - Density: 9.6/sq mi (3.7/km^{2})
- Time zone: UTC-6 (CST)
  - Summer (DST): UTC-5 (CDT)
- ZIP codes: 50435, 50460, 50616
- GNIS feature ID: 0467552

Cedar Township is one of twelve townships in Floyd County, Iowa, United States. As of the 2000 census, its population was 305.

== Geography ==
According to the United States Census Bureau, Cedar Township covers an area of 31.87 square miles (82.54 square kilometers).

=== Unincorporated towns ===
- Howardville at 43.190806°N 92.712413°W

(This list is based on USGS data and may include former settlements.)

=== Adjacent townships ===
- Afton Township, Howard County (northeast)
- East Lincoln Township, Mitchell County (northeast)
- Deerfield Township, Chickasaw County (east)
- Niles Township (southeast)
- Floyd Township (southwest)
- West Lincoln Township, Mitchell County (northwest)

=== Cemeteries ===
The township contains Howardville Cemetery.

=== Major highways ===
- U.S. Route 218

=== Airports and landing strips ===
- Henry Airport

== School districts ==
- Charles City Community School District
- Osage Community School District

== Political districts ==
- Iowa's 4th congressional district
- State House District 14
- State Senate District 7
