= Union Township, Floyd County, Iowa =

Township in Iowa, USA

Union Township
- Township
- Location in Floyd County
- Coordinates: 42°57′28″N 92°51′12″W
- Country: United States
- State: Iowa
- County: Floyd

Area
  - Total: 41.15 sq mi (106.59 km^{2})
  - Land: 40.78 sq mi (105.63 km^{2})
  - Water: 0.37 sq mi (0.97 km^{2}) 0.91%
- Elevation: 1,007 ft (307 m)

Population (2000)
  - Total: 682
  - Density: 17/sq mi (6.5/km^{2})
- Time zone: UTC-6 (CST)
  - Summer (DST): UTC-5 (CDT)
- ZIP codes: 50636, 50653
- GNIS feature ID: 0468821

Union Township is one of twelve townships in Floyd County, Iowa, United States. As of the 2000 census, its population was 682.

== Geography ==
According to the United States Census Bureau, Union Township covers an area of 41.16 square miles (106.59 square kilometers); of this, 40.78 square miles (105.63 square kilometers, 99.1 percent) is land and 0.37 square miles (0.97 square kilometers, 0.91 percent) is water.

=== Cities, towns, villages ===
- Marble Rock

=== Unincorporated towns ===
- Aureola at 42.968304°N 92.877972°W

(This list is based on USGS data and may include former settlements.)

=== Adjacent townships ===
- Ulster Township (north)
- Saint Charles Township (northeast)
- Pleasant Grove Township (east)
- Dayton Township, Butler County (southeast)
- Coldwater Township, Butler County (south)
- Bennezette Township, Butler County (southwest)
- Scott Township (west)
- Rockford Township (northwest)

=== Cemeteries ===
The township contains these three cemeteries: Hillside, Westside and St. Mary's Catholic, Roseville, Iowa.

=== Major highways ===
- Iowa Highway 14

=== Rivers ===
- Shell Rock River

== School districts ==
- Greene Community School District
- Rudd-Rockford-Marble Rock Community School District

== Political districts ==
- Iowa's 4th congressional district
- State House District 14
- State Senate District 7
