= Rockford Township, Floyd County, Iowa =

Rockford Township
- Township
- Location in Floyd County
- Coordinates: 43°03′35″N 92°57′56″W
- Country: United States
- State: Iowa
- County: Floyd

Area
  - Total: 42.43 sq mi (109.89 km^{2})
  - Land: 42.43 sq mi (109.89 km^{2})
  - Water: 0 sq mi (0 km^{2}) 0%
- Elevation: 1,024 ft (312 m)

Population (2000)
  - Total: 1,331
  - Density: 31/sq mi (12.1/km^{2})
- Time zone: UTC-6 (CST)
  - Summer (DST): UTC-5 (CDT)
- ZIP Codes: 50458, 50468, 50471
- GNIS feature ID: 0468633

Rockford Township is one of twelve townships in Floyd County, Iowa, United States. As of the 2000 census, its population was 1,331.

== Geography ==
According to the United States Census Bureau, Rockford Township covers an area of 42.43 square miles (109.89 square kilometers).

=== Cities, towns, villages ===
- Rockford

=== Adjacent townships ===
- Rock Grove Township (north)
- Rudd Township (northeast)
- Ulster Township (east)
- Union Township (southeast)
- Scott Township (south)
- Owen Township, Cerro Gordo County (west)
- Portland Township, Cerro Gordo County (northwest)

=== Cemeteries ===
The township contains Riverside Cemetery.

=== Major highways ===
- Iowa Highway 147

== School districts ==
- Nora Springs–Rock Falls Community School District
- Rudd-Rockford-Marble Rock Community School District

== Political districts ==
- Iowa's 2nd congressional district
- State House District 60
- State Senate District 30"Iowa Redistricting Plan 2 District Lookup". Legislative Services Agency.
