= Saint Charles Township, Floyd County, Iowa =

Saint Charles Township
- Township
- Location in Floyd County
- Coordinates: 43°02′32″N 92°40′39″W
- Country: United States
- State: Iowa
- County: Floyd

Area
  - Total: 63.92 sq mi (165.56 km^{2})
  - Land: 63.87 sq mi (165.43 km^{2})
  - Water: 0.050 sq mi (0.13 km^{2}) 0.08%
- Elevation: 1,053 ft (321 m)

Population (2000)
  - Total: 1,346
  - Density: 21/sq mi (8.1/km^{2})
- Time zone: UTC-6 (CST)
  - Summer (DST): UTC-5 (CDT)
- ZIP codes: 50616, 50645, 50653
- GNIS feature ID: 0468652

Saint Charles Township is one of twelve townships in Floyd County, Iowa, USA. As of the 2000 census, its population was 1,346.

== Geography ==
According to the United States Census Bureau, Saint Charles Township covers an area of 63.92 square miles (165.56 square kilometers); of this, 63.87 square miles (165.43 square kilometers, 99.92 percent) is land and 0.05 square miles (0.13 square kilometers, 0.08 percent) is water.

=== Cities, towns, villages ===
The city of Charles City is entirely within this township geographically but is a separate entity.

=== Adjacent townships ===
- Deerfield Township, Chickasaw County (northeast)
- Niles Township (northeast)
- Chickasaw Township, Chickasaw County (east)
- Riverton Township (southeast)
- Pleasant Grove Township (southwest)
- Union Township (southwest)
- Ulster Township (west)
- Floyd Township (northwest)

=== Major highways ===
- U.S. Route 18
- U.S. Route 218
- Iowa Highway 14

=== Landmarks ===
- Charles City Municipal Airport

== School districts ==
- Charles City Community School District

== Political districts ==
- Iowa's 4th congressional district
- State House District 14
- State Senate District 7
