= Scott Township, Floyd County, Iowa =

Scott Township
- Township
- Location in Floyd County
- Coordinates: 42°57′34″N 92°57′20″W
- Country: United States
- State: Iowa
- County: Floyd

Area
  - Total: 41.86 sq mi (108.42 km^{2})
  - Land: 41.8 sq mi (108.3 km^{2})
  - Water: 0.046 sq mi (0.12 km^{2}) 0.11%
- Elevation: 1,070 ft (326 m)

Population (2000)
  - Total: 223
  - Density: 5.4/sq mi (2.1/km^{2})
- Time zone: UTC-6 (CST)
  - Summer (DST): UTC-5 (CDT)
- ZIP codes: 50433, 50468, 50636, 50653
- GNIS feature ID: 0468667

Scott Township is one of twelve townships in Floyd County, Iowa, USA. As of the 2000 census, its population was 223.

== Geography ==
According to the United States Census Bureau, Scott Township covers an area of 41.86 square miles (108.42 square kilometers); of this, 41.81 square miles (108.3 square kilometers, 99.89 percent) is land and 0.05 square miles (0.12 square kilometers, 0.11 percent) is water.

=== Adjacent townships ===
- Rockford Township (north)
- Ulster Township (northeast)
- Union Township (east)
- Coldwater Township, Butler County (southeast)
- Bennezette Township, Butler County (south)
- West Fork Township, Franklin County (southwest)
- Dougherty Township, Cerro Gordo County (west)
- Owen Township, Cerro Gordo County (northwest)

=== Airports and landing strips ===
- Knoop Airport

=== Rivers ===
- Shell Rock River

== School districts ==
- Greene Community School District
- Rudd-Rockford-Marble Rock Community School District

== Political districts ==
- Iowa's 4th congressional district
- State House District 14
- State Senate District 7
