= Rock Grove Township, Floyd County, Iowa =

Rock Grove Township
- Township
- Location in Floyd County
- Coordinates: 43°09′59″N 92°58′12″W
- Country: United States
- State: Iowa
- County: Floyd

Area
  - Total: 39.92 sq mi (103.39 km^{2})
  - Land: 39.89 sq mi (103.32 km^{2})
  - Water: 0.027 sq mi (0.07 km^{2}) 0.07%
- Elevation: 1,125 ft (343 m)

Population (2000)
  - Total: 1,849
  - Density: 46/sq mi (17.9/km^{2})
- Time zone: UTC-6 (CST)
  - Summer (DST): UTC-5 (CDT)
- ZIP codes: 50458, 50471
- GNIS feature ID: 0468635

Rock Grove Township is one of twelve townships in Floyd County, Iowa, USA. At the 2000 census, its population was 1,849.

== Geography ==
According to the United States Census Bureau, Rock Grove Township covers an area of 39.92 square miles (103.4 km^{2}) of which 39.89 square miles (103.3 km^{2}) {99.93 percent) is land and 0.03 square miles (0.078 km^{2}) (0.07 percent) is water.

=== Cities, towns, villages ===
- Nora Springs (vast majority)

=== Unincorporated towns ===
- Nora Junction at 43.139969°N 93.016312°W

(This list is based on USGS data and may include former settlements.)

=== Adjacent townships ===
- Cedar Township, Mitchell County (northeast)
- Rudd Township (east)
- Rockford Township (south)
- Portland Township, Cerro Gordo County (west)
- Falls Township, Cerro Gordo County (northwest)

=== Cemeteries ===
The township contains three cemeteries: Park, Rock Grove Township and Spring Grove.

=== Major highways ===
- U.S. Route 18

=== Rivers ===
- Shell Rock River

== School districts ==
- Nora Springs–Rock Falls Community School District
- Rudd-Rockford-Marble Rock Community School District

== Political districts ==
- Iowa's 4th congressional district
- State House District 14
- State Senate District 7
