= Riverton Township, Floyd County, Iowa =

Riverton Township
- Township
- Location in Floyd County
- Coordinates: 42°57′58″N 92°37′05″W
- Country: United States
- State: Iowa
- County: Floyd

Area
  - Total: 44.35 sq mi (114.86 km^{2})
  - Land: 44.19 sq mi (114.44 km^{2})
  - Water: 0.16 sq mi (0.41 km^{2}) 0.36%
- Elevation: 1,037 ft (316 m)

Population (2000)
  - Total: 508
  - Density: 11/sq mi (4.4/km^{2})
- Time zone: UTC-6 (CST)
  - Summer (DST): UTC-5 (CDT)
- ZIP codes: 50616, 50636, 50658
- GNIS feature ID: 0468624

Riverton Township is one of twelve townships in Floyd County, Iowa, USA. As of the 2000 census, its population was 508.

== Geography ==
According to the United States Census Bureau, Riverton Township covers an area of 44.35 square miles (114.86 square kilometers); of this, 44.19 square miles (114.44 square kilometers, 99.63 percent) is land and 0.16 square miles (0.41 square kilometers, 0.36 percent) is water.

=== Cities, towns, villages ===
- Nashua (west quarter)

=== Unincorporated towns ===
- Carrville at 43.008863°N 92.574908°W
- Midway at 43.005251°N 92.605464°W

(This list is based on USGS data and may include former settlements.)

=== Adjacent townships ===
- Chickasaw Township, Chickasaw County (northeast)
- Bradford Township, Chickasaw County (east)
- Polk Township, Bremer County (southeast)
- Fremont Township, Butler County (south)
- Dayton Township, Butler County (southwest)
- Pleasant Grove Township (west)
- Saint Charles Township (northwest)

=== Cemeteries ===
The township contains these two cemeteries: Ligget and Riverton.

=== Major highways ===
- U.S. Route 218

=== Rivers ===
- Cedar River

=== Landmarks ===
- Bunns Woods County Park
- Howards Wood Recreational Area

== School districts ==
- Charles City Community School District
- Greene Community School District
- Nashua-Plainfield Community School District

== Political districts ==
- Iowa's 4th congressional district
- State House District 14
- State Senate District 7
