= Riverton Township =

Riverton Township may refer to the following places in the United States:

- Riverton Township, Clay County, Iowa
- Riverton Township, Floyd County, Iowa
- Riverton Township, Michigan
- Riverton Township, Clay County, Minnesota

See also

- Riverton (disambiguation)
