= Ulster Township, Floyd County, Iowa =

Ulster Township
- Township
- Location in Floyd County
- Coordinates: 43°03′50″N 92°50′54″W
- Country: United States
- State: Iowa
- County: Floyd

Area
  - Total: 41.51 sq mi (107.51 km^{2})
  - Land: 41.51 sq mi (107.51 km^{2})
  - Water: 0 sq mi (0 km^{2}) 0%
- Elevation: 1,040 ft (317 m)

Population (2000)
  - Total: 373
  - Density: 9.1/sq mi (3.5/km^{2})
- Time zone: UTC-6 (CST)
  - Summer (DST): UTC-5 (CDT)
- ZIP codes: 50435, 50468, 50471, 50616
- GNIS feature ID: 0468804

Ulster Township is one of twelve townships in Floyd County, Iowa, USA. As of the 2000 census, its population was 373.

== Geography ==
According to the United States Census Bureau, Ulster Township covers an area of 41.51 square miles (107.51 square kilometers).

=== Unincorporated towns ===
- Carney at 43.029138°N 92.810471°W
- Roseville at 43.009138°N 92.809915°W

(This list is based on USGS data and may include former settlements.)

=== Adjacent townships ===
- Rudd Township (north)
- Floyd Township (northeast)
- Saint Charles Township (east)
- Union Township (south)
- Scott Township (southwest)
- Rockford Township (west)

=== Cemeteries ===
Ulster Township contains Ulsterville Cemetery

=== Major highways ===
- Iowa Highway 14
- Iowa Highway 147

== School districts ==
- Charles City Community School District
- Rudd-Rockford-Marble Rock Community School District

== Political districts ==
- Iowa's 4th congressional district
- State House District 14
- State Senate District 7
