= Roseville, Iowa =

- Census-designated place
- Location in Iowa
- Coordinates: 43°0′36″N 92°48′43″W
- Country: United States
- State: Iowa
- County: Floyd
- Township: Ulster and Union

Area
  - Total: 3.69 sq mi (9.56 km^{2})
  - Land: 3.69 sq mi (9.56 km^{2})
  - Water: 0 sq mi (0.00 km^{2})

Population (2020)
  - Total: 39
  - Density: 10.6/sq mi (4.08/km^{2})
- Time zone: Central (CST)
- FIPS code: 19-68800
- GNIS feature ID: 2585484

Roseville is a census-designated place (CDP) mainly located in Ulster Township and a small portion in the northern part of Union Township in Floyd County in the state of Iowa. A post office operated in Roseville from 1903 to 1904. As of the 2020 census the population was 39

Its location is approximately 6 miles (10 km) northeast of the city of Marble Rock or 11 miles (18 km) southwest of the city of Charles City, along Iowa Highway 14.

== Demographics ==
Historical population
Census	Pop.	Note	%±
2010	49		—
2020	39		−20.4%
U.S. Decennial Census

=== 2020 census ===
As of the census of 2020, there were 39 people, 8 households, and 8 families residing in the community. The population density was 10.6 inhabitants per square mile (4.1/km^{2}). There were 17 housing units at an average density of 4.6 per square mile (1.8/km^{2}). The racial makeup of the community was 82.1% White, 0.0% Black or African American, 0.0% Native American, 0.0% Asian, 0.0% Pacific Islander, 2.6% from other races and 15.4% from two or more races. Hispanic or Latino persons of any race comprised 7.7% of the population.

Of the 8 households, 12.5% of which had children under the age of 18 living with them, 87.5% were married couples living together, 0.0% were cohabitating couples, 0.0% had a female householder with no spouse or partner present and 12.5% had a male householder with no spouse or partner present. 0.0% of all households were non-families. 0.0% of all households were made up of individuals, 0.0% had someone living alone who was 65 years old or older.

The median age in the community was 29.2 years. 25.6% of the residents were under the age of 20; 23.1% were between the ages of 20 and 24; 12.8% were from 25 and 44; 20.5% were from 45 and 64; and 17.9% were 65 years of age or older. The gender makeup of the community was 59.0% male and 41.0% female.
