= Ulster Township =

Ulster Township may refer to the following townships in the United States:

- Ulster Township, Floyd County, Iowa
- Ulster Township, Pennsylvania
