= Charles City High School =

Public secondary school in Charles City, Iowa, United States

Location
- 1 Comet Drive; Charles City, Iowa 50616; United States; 43.061669°N 92.6572°W

Information
- Type: Public secondary
- School district: Charles City Community School District
- Principal: Jeromiah Bliss
- Staff: 31.63 (FTE)
- Grades: 9-12
- Enrollment: 522 (2023-2024)
- Campus type: Town, Remote
- Colors: Orange and Black
- Athletics conference: Northeast Iowa
- Team name: Comets
- Website: hs.charlescityschools.org

Charles City High School is the public high school serving Charles City, Iowa. It is part of the Charles City Community School District.

== Athletics ==
Charles City is a founding member of the Northeast Iowa Conference, and the Comets participate in the following sports:

- Cross Country
  - Boys' State Champions - 1951
- Volleyball
  - 2012 Class 4A State Champions
- Football
- Basketball
- Swimming
- Wrestling
  - 1986 Class 3A State Champions
- Track and Field
  - Boys' 2005 Class 3A State Champions
- Soccer
- Tennis
- Golf
  - Girls' 2-time Class 3A State Champions (2011, 2013)
- Baseball
- Softball
  - 1979 State Champions

== See also ==
- List of high schools in Iowa
