= Howardville Wesleyan Church =

Coordinates: 43°11′27.8″N 92°42′26.6″W

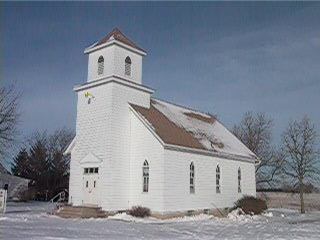
Howardville Church in the winter

Howardville Wesleyan Church was a Wesleyan church located 5 miles (8.0 km) north of the town of Floyd, Iowa. The church served its community for 160 years from 1855 to 2016.

== Early years ==
The church started out as ‘Howard’s Grove Free Sunday School’ in 1856.

=== History leaflet ===
The following comes word for word from the type-written "History of the Howardville Church" which was on constant display at the church:

One of the first acts of group of settlers, who grouped themselves around the community of Howardville, was to begin a Sunday school and in 1855 just one year after the first settlement was made in this area, "religious services were held in the house of Elbert Howard; Rev. Samuel Smith, of the Wesleyan Methodist persuasion, was the preacher.

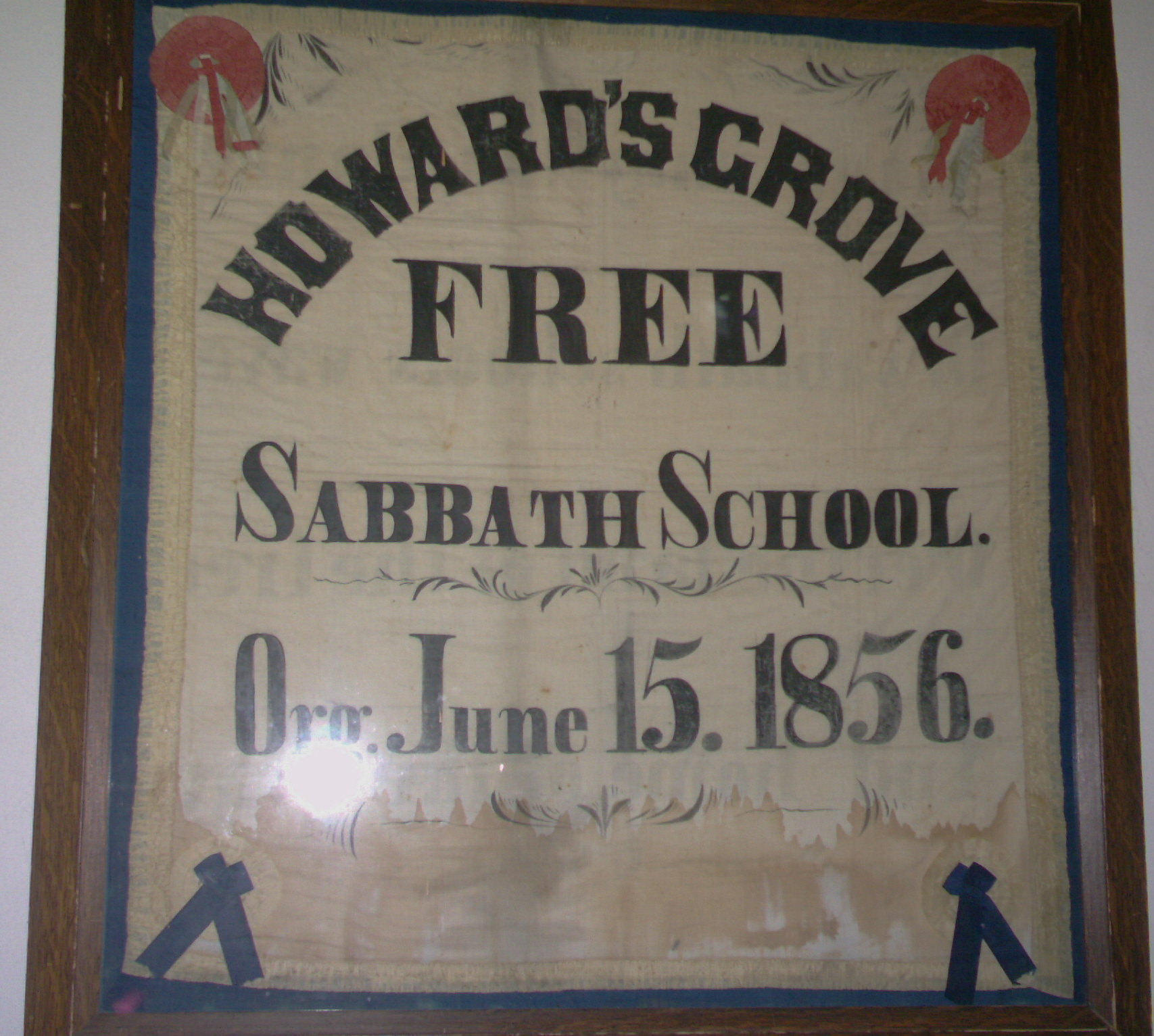
Howardville Sunday school banner

The Howardville Wesleyan Methodist Church had its beginning in the very early history of Iowa. The Sunday School was formerly organized in 1856 and for many years met in the Howardville school. The church was organized in 1859 when a convention was called by Reverend George I. Cummins to examine these who wished to organize a church society. The following persons related their Christian experience and were received as Charter members of the church:

Charter Members

1. Lucian M. Foster
2. Sarah M. Foster
3. Betsy Bennett
4. Mary Ann Caswell
5. Sophia Foster

This Church was received into the Wesleyan Methodist Connection of Churches.

== Closure ==
The church held its last service on July 31, 2016.
