= Floyd County Courthouse (Iowa) =

- Floyd County Court House
- U.S. National Register of Historic Places
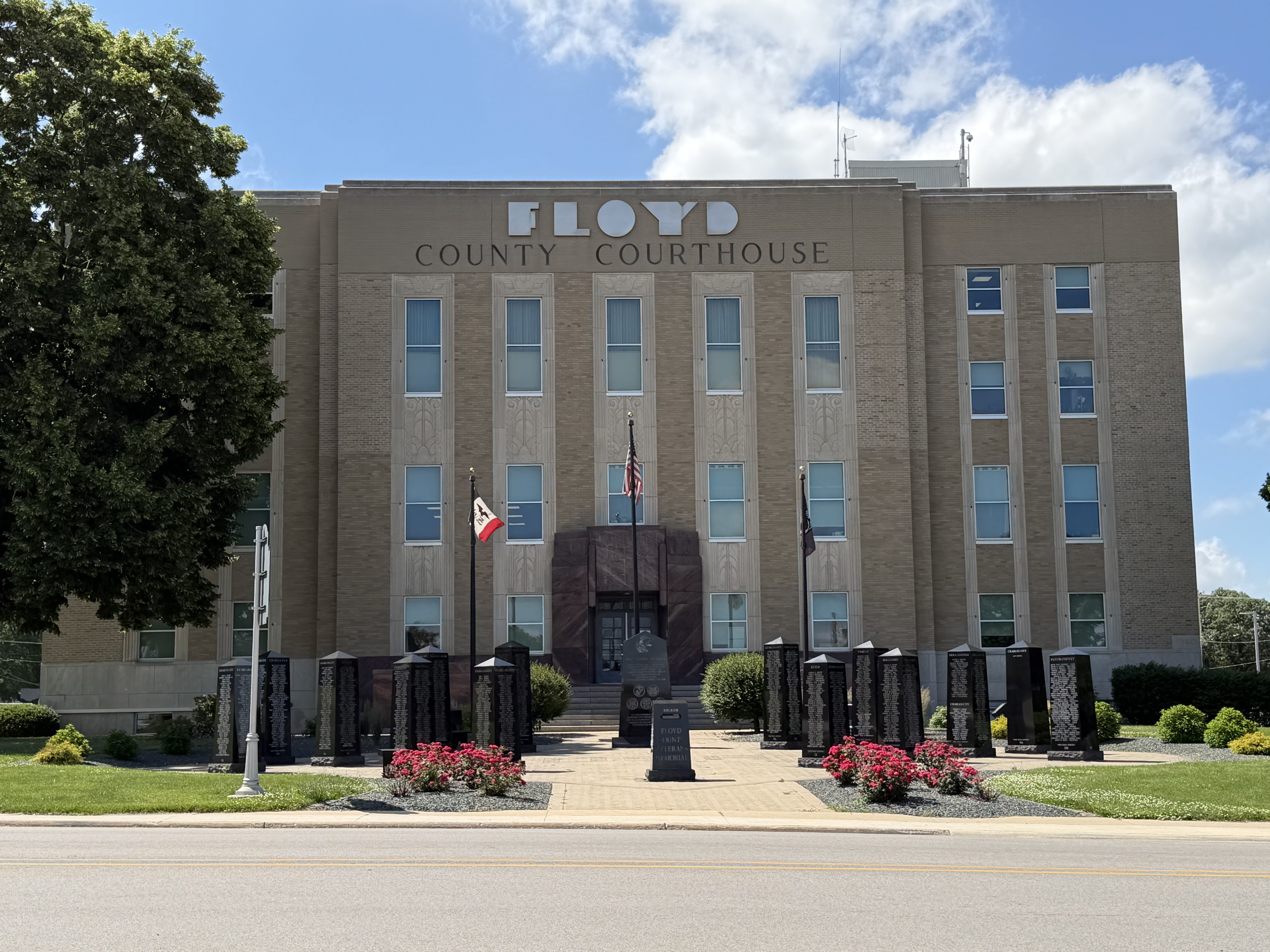

- Location within Iowa Location within the United States
- Location: 101 S. Main St. Charles City, Iowa
- Coordinates: 43°3′56″N 92°40′54″W
- Area: less than 5 acres (2.0 ha)
- Built: 1940
- Architect: Hansen & Waggoner
- Architectural style: PWA Moderne
- MPS: PWA-Era County Courthouses of IA MPS
- NRHP reference No.: 03000816
- Added to NRHP: August 28, 2003

The Floyd County Court House in Charles City, Iowa, United States was built in 1940. It was listed on the National Register of Historic Places in 2003 as a part of the PWA-Era County Courthouses of IA Multiple Properties Submission. It is the only property in this group, however, that was built without funding from the Public Works Administration (PWA). The courthouse is the third structure to house court functions and county administration.

== History ==
In the early years of the county records were kept in the homes or businesses of county officials. The first courthouse was a two-story stone structure built for $18,000 in 1861. The building featured a self-supporting roof and a cupola which lightning struck on June 7, 1874. A fire destroyed the courthouse in 1881, but most county records were saved. Officials constructed a new courthouse of brick trimmed in stone on the foundation of the former structure at a cost of $17,000 and it was completed in 1881.

In 1938, officials campaigned voters to approve the sale of $110,000 in bonds for construction of a new courthouse based on a matching grant of $90,000 from the PWA. Mason City architects Hansen & Waggoner had been retained to design the new building and a campaign to fund the courthouse contained their design sketch. The referendum passed on September 23, 1938, but the PWA funding was not approved.

The old courthouse was condemned in 1939, which necessitated emergency measures. Voters approved a second referendum March 25, 1940, for an amount double the earlier authorization due to no promise of PWA funding. In April 1940, the county board of supervisors narrowly authorized construction of a new courthouse based on Hansen & Waggoner's design on the same site as the previous courthouse. Ground was broken on August 15, 1940, and the cornerstone was laid on October 19, 1940. The total construction costs were $265,000, and it was all paid for by county funds with no PWA funds. Governor George A. Wilson was the featured speaker at the dedication held October 10, 1941.

== Architecture ==
The architectural style of the building is known as Depression Modern or PWA Moderne. The design also includes Art Deco elements. It features a central bay that extends from the symmetrical façade. The exterior is composed of pressed brick and red granite trim. On the interior, a central corridor extends the length of each floor with the offices opening onto the corridors. A central staircase is located opposite the main entrance. The interior featured multi-colored terrazzo floors, marble wainscoting, and glass block in office entrances and stairwell lights.

The building is located on the courthouse square to the south of the Cedar River. It is a contributing site in the historic designation. The square is planted with deciduous and coniferous trees, and the county veteran's memorial sits in front of the main entrance. The previous courthouse was located on the same square. The central business district is on the opposite side of the river.
