= Powersville, Iowa =

- Unincorporated community
- Location within Iowa
- Coordinates: 42°56′11″N 92°41′14″W
- Country: United States
- State: Iowa
- County: Floyd
- Elevation: 1,034 ft (315 m)
- Time zone: UTC-6 (Central (CST))
  - Summer (DST): UTC-5 (CDT)
- Area code: 641
- GNIS feature ID: 460381

Powersville is an unincorporated community in Floyd County, Iowa, United States.

== History ==
A post office operated in Powersville from 1889 to 1916. Powersville's population was 50 in 1925. The population was 50 in 1940.
