= Rudd, Iowa =

- City
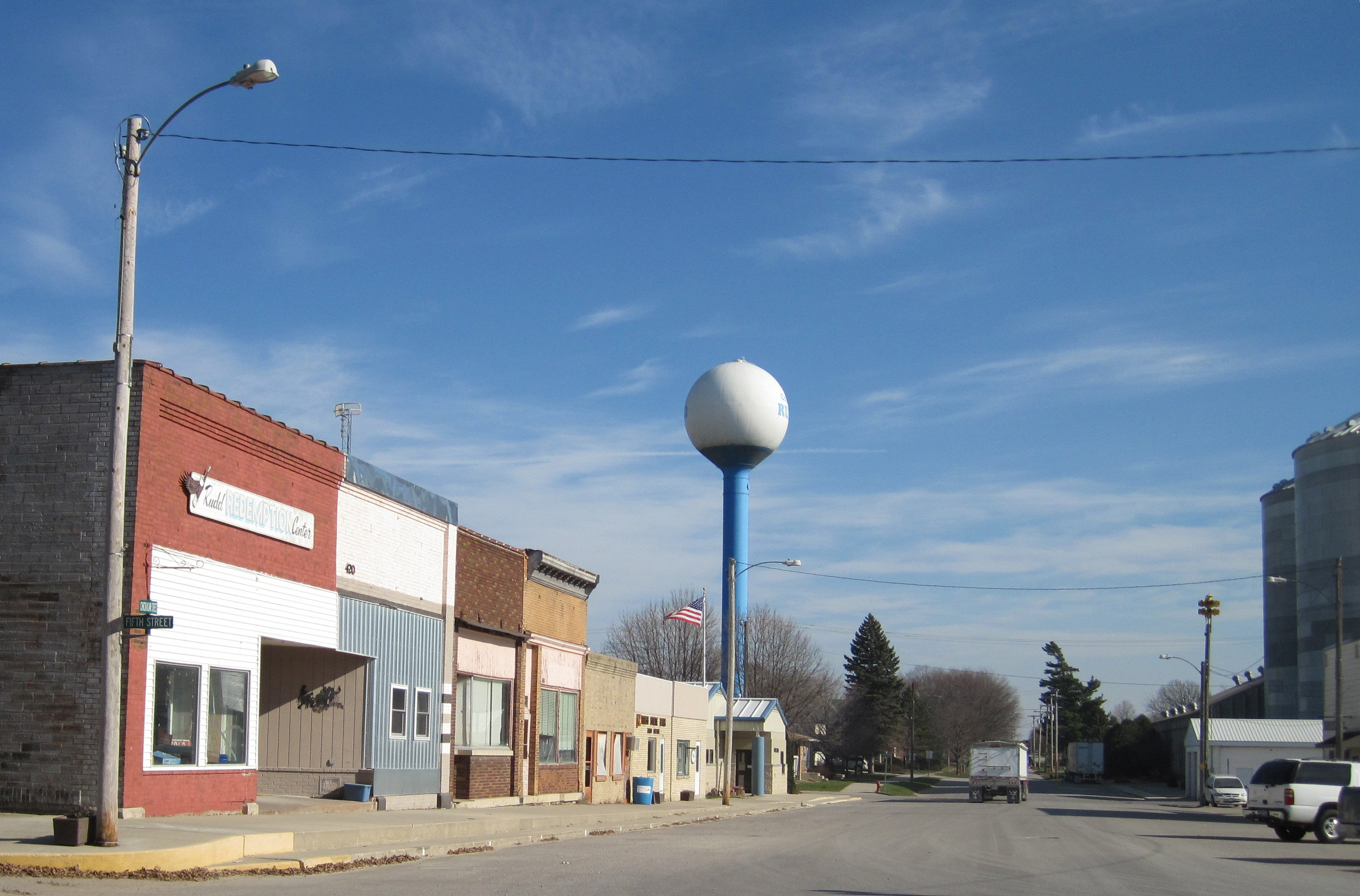

- Location of Rudd, Iowa
- Coordinates: 43°07′27″N 92°54′17″W
- Country: USA
- State: Iowa
- County: Floyd
- Township: Rudd
- Incorporated: February 7, 1900

Area
  - Total: 1.09 sq mi (2.82 km^{2})
  - Land: 1.09 sq mi (2.82 km^{2})
  - Water: 0 sq mi (0.00 km^{2})
- Elevation: 1,109 ft (338 m)

Population (2020)
  - Total: 358
  - Density: 329.1/sq mi (127.06/km^{2})
- Time zone: UTC-6 (Central (CST))
  - Summer (DST): UTC-5 (CDT)
- ZIP code: 50471
- Area code: 641
- FIPS code: 19-69195
- GNIS feature ID: 2396446

Rudd is a city in Floyd County, Iowa, United States. The population was 358 at the time of the 2020 census, a decline of 16.9% from 431 in 2000. A post office opened in Rudd in 1869.

== Geography ==
According to the United States Census Bureau, the city has a total area of 0.87 square miles (2.25 km^{2}), all land.

== Demographics ==
Historical populations
Year	Pop.	±%
1880	170	—
1900	381	+124.1%
1910	296	−22.3%
1920	487	+64.5%
1930	429	−11.9%
1940	410	−4.4%
1950	398	−2.9%
1960	436	+9.5%
1970	429	−1.6%
1980	460	+7.2%
1990	429	−6.7%
2000	431	+0.5%
2010	369	−14.4%
2020	358	−3.0%
Source:"U.S. Census website". United States Census Bureau. and Iowa Data Center; Source: U.S. Decennial Census

=== 2020 census ===
As of the census of 2020, there were 358 people, 165 households, and 102 families residing in the city. The population density was 329.1 inhabitants per square mile (127.1/km^{2}). There were 176 housing units at an average density of 161.8 per square mile (62.5/km^{2}). The racial makeup of the city was 94.1% White, 0.3% Black or African American, 0.6% Native American, 1.1% Asian, 0.0% Pacific Islander, 0.0% from other races and 3.9% from two or more races. Hispanic or Latino persons of any race comprised 4.5% of the population.

Of the 165 households, 27.9% of which had children under the age of 18 living with them, 38.8% were married couples living together, 10.9% were cohabitating couples, 27.3% had a female householder with no spouse or partner present and 23.0% had a male householder with no spouse or partner present. 38.2% of all households were non-families. 31.5% of all households were made up of individuals, 13.9% had someone living alone who was 65 years old or older.

The median age in the city was 36.0 years. 28.8% of the residents were under the age of 20; 4.2% were between the ages of 20 and 24; 26.8% were from 25 and 44; 22.9% were from 45 and 64; and 17.3% were 65 years of age or older. The gender makeup of the city was 51.4% male and 48.6% female.

=== 2010 census ===
As of the census of 2010, there were 369 people, 175 households, and 103 families living in the city. The population density was 424.1 inhabitants per square mile (163.7/km^{2}). There were 187 housing units at an average density of 214.9 per square mile (83.0/km^{2}). The racial makeup of the city was 95.9% White, 0.5% Native American, 0.8% from other races, and 2.7% from two or more races. Hispanic or Latino of any race were 4.9% of the population.

There were 175 households, of which 25.1% had children under the age of 18 living with them, 45.1% were married couples living together, 7.4% had a female householder with no husband present, 6.3% had a male householder with no wife present, and 41.1% were non-families. 35.4% of all households were made up of individuals, and 10.9% had someone living alone who was 65 years of age or older. The average household size was 2.11 and the average family size was 2.71.

The median age in the city was 45.2 years. 21.1% of residents were under the age of 18; 6.5% were between the ages of 18 and 24; 22.3% were from 25 to 44; 30.3% were from 45 to 64; and 19.8% were 65 years of age or older. The gender makeup of the city was 50.7% male and 49.3% female.

=== 2000 census ===
As of the census of 2000, there were 431 people, 182 households, and 123 families living in the city. The population density was 432.4 inhabitants per square mile (167.0/km^{2}). There were 188 housing units at an average density of 188.6 per square mile (72.8/km^{2}). The racial makeup of the city was 99.07% White, and 0.93% from two or more races. Hispanic or Latino of any race were 1.39% of the population.

There were 182 households, out of which 31.3% had children under the age of 18 living with them, 58.2% were married couples living together, 6.0% had a female householder with no husband present, and 32.4% were non-families. 28.0% of all households were made up of individuals, and 13.7% had someone living alone who was 65 years of age or older. The average household size was 2.37 and the average family size was 2.91.

In the city, the population was spread out, with 26.2% under the age of 18, 7.0% from 18 to 24, 24.8% from 25 to 44, 24.6% from 45 to 64, and 17.4% who were 65 years of age or older. The median age was 40 years. For every 100 females, there were 90.7 males. For every 100 females age 18 and over, there were 95.1 males.

The median income for a household in the city was $32,679, and the median income for a family was $43,750. Males had a median income of $29,750 versus $20,625 for females. The per capita income for the city was $17,167. About 4.6% of families and 7.7% of the population were below the poverty line, including 9.2% of those under age 18 and 7.5% of those age 65 or over.

== Education ==
The Rudd-Rockford-Marble Rock Community School District operates area public schools.
