= Midway, Floyd County, Iowa =

Midway, Iowa
- Unincorporated community
- Location within Iowa
- Coordinates: 43°00′19″N 92°36′20″W
- Country: United States
- State: Iowa
- County: Floyd
- Elevation: 1,014 ft (309 m)
- Time zone: UTC-6 (Central (CST))
  - Summer (DST): UTC-5 (CDT)
- Area code: 641
- GNIS feature ID: 459068

Midway is an unincorporated community in Floyd County, Iowa, United States. Midway is located near the Cedar River, 5.4 miles (8.7 km) southeast of Charles City.
