= Floyd County, Iowa =

County in Iowa, United States

- County
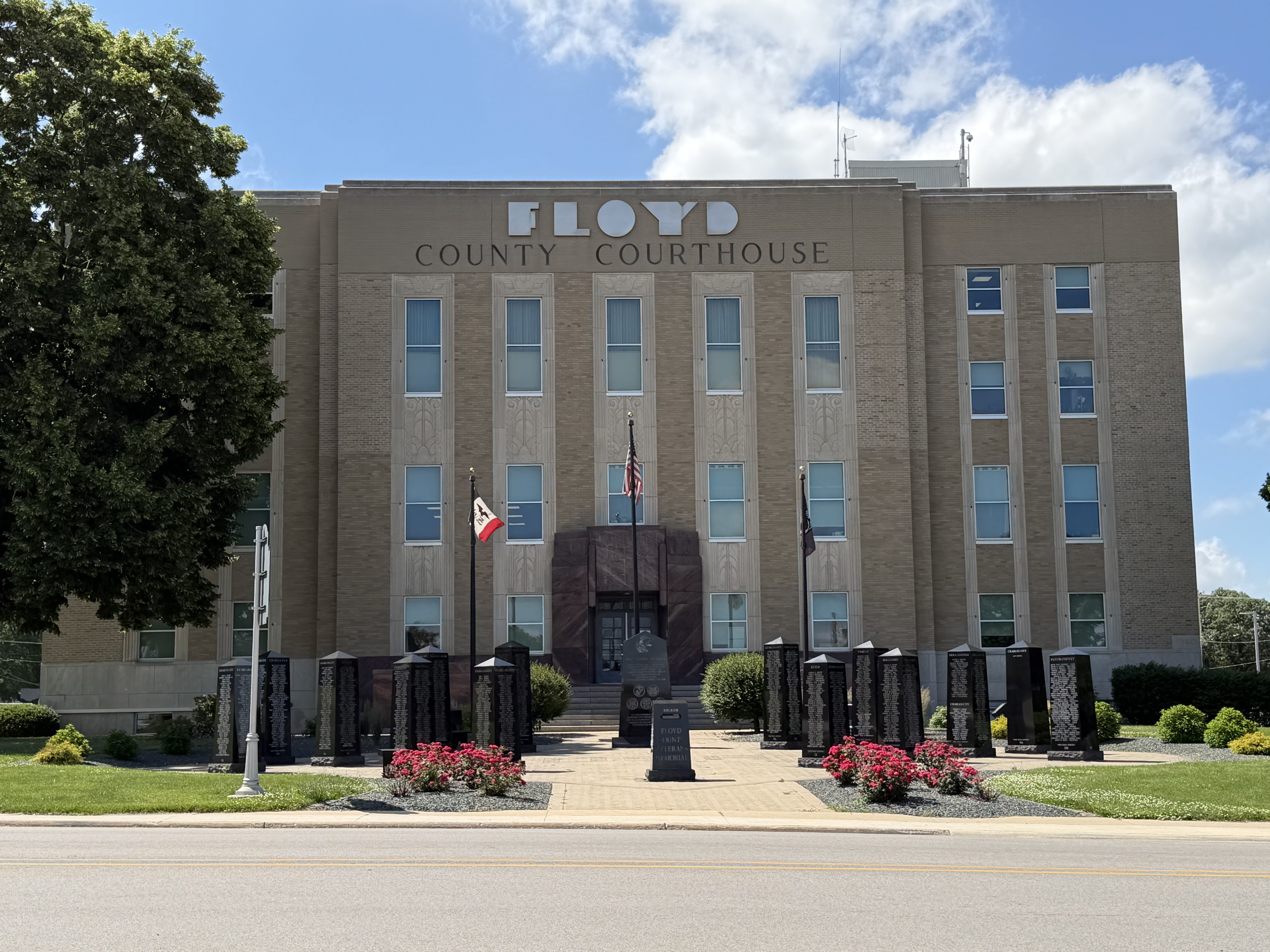
- Courthouse in Charles City with Veterans Memorial in front

- Location within the U.S. state of Iowa
- Coordinates: 43°03′24″N 92°47′02″W
- Country: United States
- State: Iowa
- Founded: January 15, 1851 (created); 04 September 4, 1854 (organized)
- Named for: Charles Floyd
- Seat: Charles City
- Largest city: Charles City

Area
  - Total: 501 sq mi (1,300 km^{2})
  - Land: 501 sq mi (1,300 km^{2})
  - Water: 0.8 sq mi (2.1 km^{2}) 0.1%

Population (2020)
  - Total: 15,627
  - Estimate (2025): 14,901 ▼
  - Density: 31.2/sq mi (12.0/km^{2})
- Time zone: UTC−6 (Central)
  - Summer (DST): UTC−5 (CDT)
- Congressional district: 4th
- Website: www.floydco.iowa.gov
- Iowa county number 34

Floyd County is a county located in the U.S. state of Iowa. As of the 2020 census, the population was 15,627. The county seat and the largest city is Charles City.

== History ==
Floyd County was established in 1854 and was named for Sergeant Charles Floyd of the Lewis and Clark Expedition, who died in 1804 near what is now Sioux City, Iowa, and who was the only member to die on the Expedition.

The first school in the county was taught at Nora Springs in 1854. The second was opened at Charles City, the third at Floyd. Twelve years later there were 54 schools in the county, in September 1875, there were 100 school-houses in Floyd County.

== Geography ==
According to the United States Census Bureau, the county has a total area of 501 square miles (1,300 km^{2}), of which 501 square miles (1,300 km^{2}) is land and 0.8 square miles (2.1 km^{2}) (0.1%) is water.

=== Major highways ===
- U.S. Highway 18
- U.S. Highway 218
- Iowa Highway 14
- Iowa Highway 27

=== Adjacent counties ===
- Mitchell County (north)
- Chickasaw County (east)
- Butler County (south)
- Cerro Gordo County (west)
- Howard County (northeast)
- Bremer County (southeast)
- Franklin County (southwest)

== Demographics ==
Historical population
| Census | Pop. | Note | %± |
|---|---|---|---|
| 1860 | 3,744 | | — |
| 1870 | 10,768 | | 187.6% |
| 1880 | 14,677 | | 36.3% |
| 1890 | 15,424 | | 5.1% |
| 1900 | 17,754 | | 15.1% |
| 1910 | 17,119 | | −3.6% |
| 1920 | 18,860 | | 10.2% |
| 1930 | 19,524 | | 3.5% |
| 1940 | 20,169 | | 3.3% |
| 1950 | 21,505 | | 6.6% |
| 1960 | 21,102 | | −1.9% |
| 1970 | 19,860 | | −5.9% |
| 1980 | 19,597 | | −1.3% |
| 1990 | 17,058 | | −13.0% |
| 2000 | 16,900 | | −0.9% |
| 2010 | 16,303 | | −3.5% |
| 2020 | 15,627 | | −4.1% |
| 2025 (est.) | 14,901 | ▼ | −4.6% |
U.S. Decennial Census; 1790–1960 1900–1990; 1990–2000 2010–2020

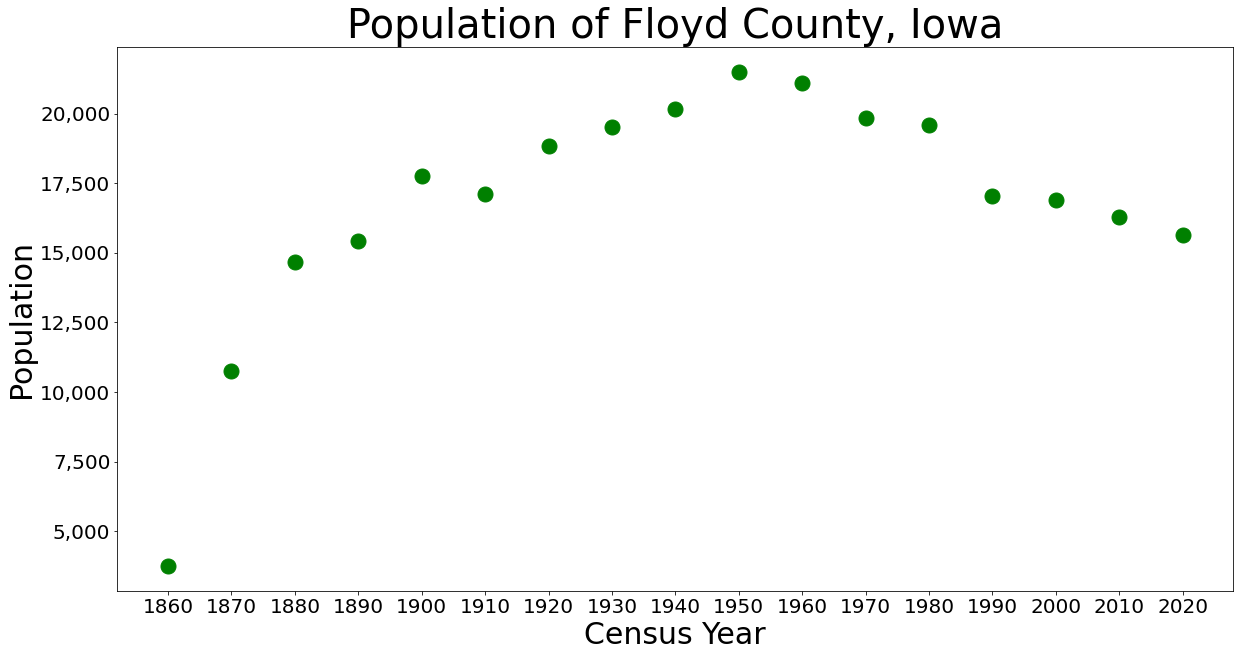
Population of Floyd County from US census data

=== 2020 census ===
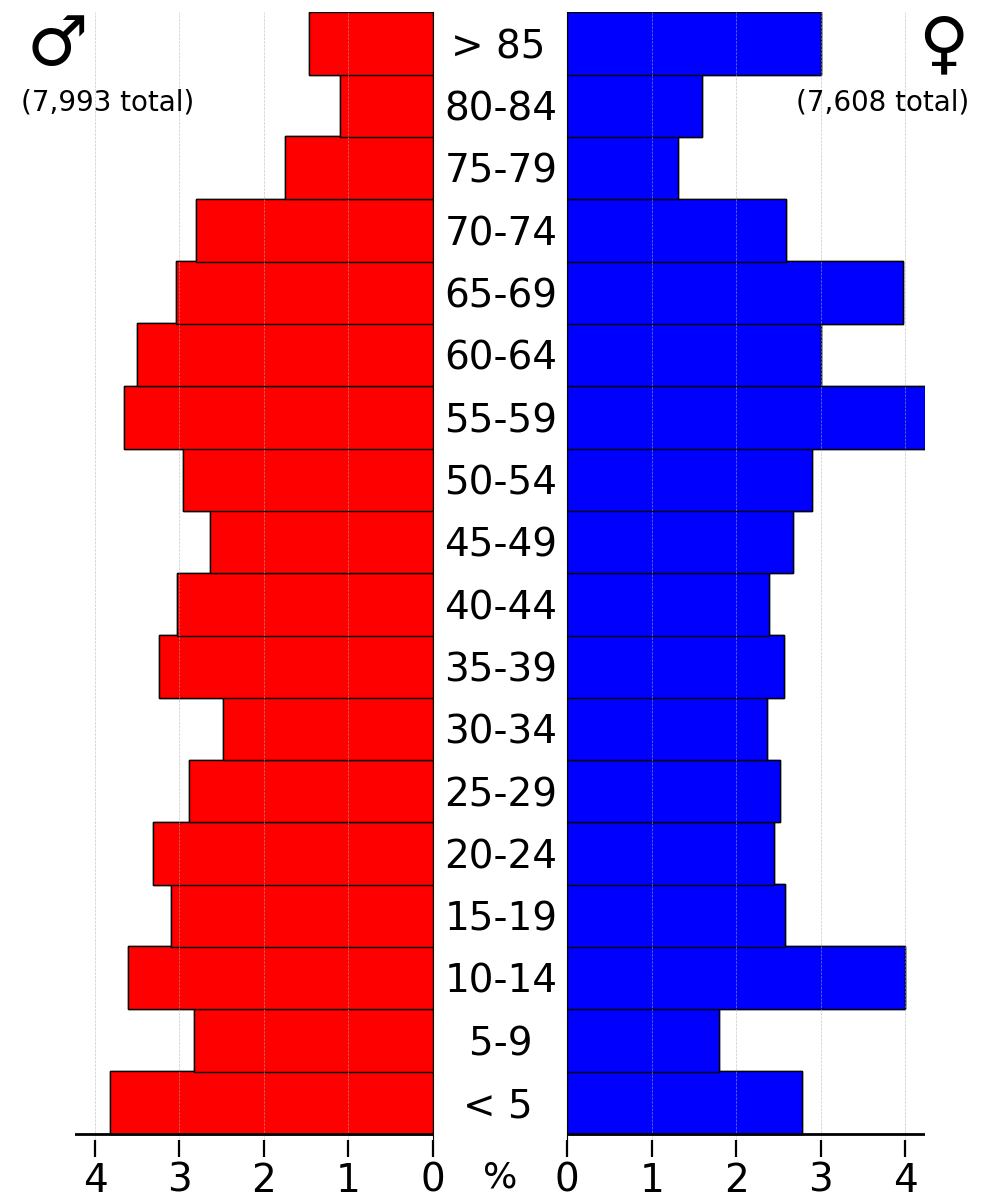
2022 US Census population pyramid for Floyd County from ACS 5-year estimates

As of the 2020 census, the county had a population of 15,627 and a population density of 31.1/sq mi (12.0/km^{2}). There were 7,314 housing units, of which 6,674 were occupied.

The median age was 43.6 years. 23.4% of residents were under the age of 18 and 22.3% of residents were 65 years of age or older. For every 100 females there were 98.4 males, and for every 100 females age 18 and over there were 95.9 males age 18 and over.

96.21% of the population reported being of one race. The racial makeup of the county was 90.2% White, 2.7% Black or African American, 0.2% American Indian and Alaska Native, 1.9% Asian, 0.1% Native Hawaiian and Pacific Islander, 1.2% from some other race, and 3.8% from two or more races. Hispanic or Latino residents of any race comprised 3.5% of the population.

46.4% of residents lived in urban areas, while 53.6% lived in rural areas.

There were 6,674 households in the county, of which 26.3% had children under the age of 18 living in them. Of all households, 49.4% were married-couple households, 20.0% were households with a male householder and no spouse or partner present, and 24.6% were households with a female householder and no spouse or partner present. About 33.2% of all households were made up of individuals and 16.0% had someone living alone who was 65 years of age or older.

Among occupied housing units, 74.6% were owner-occupied and 25.4% were renter-occupied. The homeowner vacancy rate was 2.2% and the rental vacancy rate was 11.9%.

Floyd County Racial Composition
| Race | Number | Percent |
|---|---|---|
| White (NH) | 13,907 | 89% |
| Black or African American (NH) | 415 | 2.7% |
| Native American (NH) | 29 | 2.7% |
| Asian (NH) | 293 | 0.2% |
| Pacific Islander (NH) | 12 | 0.1% |
| Other/Mixed (NH) | 421 | 3.2% |
| Hispanic or Latino | 550 | 2.7% |

=== 2010 census ===
The 2010 census recorded a population of 16,303 in the county, with a population density of 32.6/sq mi (12.6/km^{2}). There were 7,526 housing units, of which 6,886 were occupied.

=== 2000 census ===
As of the census of 2000, there were 16,900 people, 6,828 households, and 4,711 families residing in the county. The population density was 34 people per square mile (13 people/km^{2}). There were 7,317 housing units at an average density of 15 units per square mile (5.8 units/km^{2}). The racial makeup of the county was 98.11% White, 0.23% Black or African American, 0.09% Native American, 0.43% Asian, 0.09% Pacific Islander, 0.44% from other races, and 0.60% from two or more races. 1.31% of the population were Hispanic or Latino of any race.

There were 6,828 households, out of which 30.50% had children under the age of 18 living with them, 57.70% were married couples living together, 7.70% had a female householder with no husband present, and 31.00% were non-families. 28.00% of all households were made up of individuals, and 14.60% had someone living alone who was 65 years of age or older. The average household size was 2.40 and the average family size was 2.92.

In the county, the population was spread out, with 25.10% under the age of 18, 7.00% from 18 to 24, 24.40% from 25 to 44, 24.20% from 45 to 64, and 19.20% who were 65 years of age or older. The median age was 40 years. For every 100 females there were 93.50 males. For every 100 females age 18 and over, there were 90.40 males.

The median income for a household in the county was $35,237, and the median income for a family was $41,133. Males had a median income of $30,285 versus $20,867 for females. The per capita income for the county was $17,091. About 6.50% of families and 9.30% of the population were below the poverty line, including 13.00% of those under age 18 and 5.70% of those age 65 or over.

== Communities ==
=== Cities ===
- Charles City
- Colwell
- Floyd
- Marble Rock
- Nora Springs
- Rockford
- Rudd

=== Unincorporated communities ===
- Midway
- Oakwood
- Powersville
- Roseville (a census-designated place)

=== Townships ===
Floyd County is divided into twelve townships:

- Cedar
- Floyd
- Niles
- Pleasant Grove
- Riverton
- Rock Grove
- Rockford
- Rudd
- Saint Charles
- Scott
- Ulster
- Union

=== Population ranking ===
The population ranking of the following table is based on the 2020 census of Floyd County.

† county seat

| Rank | City/Town/etc. | Municipal type | Population (2020 Census) |
|---|---|---|---|
| 1 | † Charles City | City | 7,396 |
| 2 | Nashua (mostly in Chickasaw County) | City | 1,551 |
| 3 | Nora Springs (partially in Cerro Gordo County) | City | 1,369 |
| 4 | Greene (mostly in Butler County) | City | 990 |
| 5 | Rockford | City | 758 |
| 6 | Rudd | City | 358 |
| 7 | Floyd | City | 313 |
| 8 | Marble Rock | City | 271 |
| 9 | Colwell | City | 55 |
| 10 | Roseville | CDP | 39 |

== Politics ==
Prior to 1988, Floyd County was strongly Republican in presidential elections. In only four elections from 1896 to 1984 did a Republican presidential candidate fail to win the county. Starting with the 1988 election, the county consistently backed Democratic Party presidential candidates up until the 2016 election. In that presidential election, the county swung 29.5 points Republican with Donald Trump winning the county by over 14 points after Barack Obama won the county by a similar margin 4 years earlier.

United States presidential election results for Floyd County, Iowa
| Year | Republican | | Democratic | | Third party(ies) | |
| Year | No. | % | No. | % | No. | % |
|---|---|---|---|---|---|---|
| 1896 | 2,749 | 64.15% | 1,461 | 34.10% | 75 | 1.75% |
| 1900 | 2,843 | 67.56% | 1,295 | 30.77% | 70 | 1.66% |
| 1904 | 2,820 | 76.28% | 761 | 20.58% | 116 | 3.14% |
| 1908 | 2,462 | 65.13% | 1,250 | 33.07% | 68 | 1.80% |
| 1912 | 1,216 | 31.13% | 1,244 | 31.85% | 1,446 | 37.02% |
| 1916 | 2,691 | 66.10% | 1,250 | 30.70% | 130 | 3.19% |
| 1920 | 6,106 | 84.84% | 933 | 12.96% | 158 | 2.20% |
| 1924 | 5,012 | 66.00% | 529 | 6.97% | 2,053 | 27.03% |
| 1928 | 5,675 | 72.80% | 2,074 | 26.61% | 46 | 0.59% |
| 1932 | 4,083 | 46.50% | 4,563 | 51.96% | 135 | 1.54% |
| 1936 | 4,267 | 47.25% | 4,242 | 46.97% | 522 | 5.78% |
| 1940 | 5,829 | 58.11% | 4,167 | 41.54% | 35 | 0.35% |
| 1944 | 5,248 | 60.11% | 3,446 | 39.47% | 37 | 0.42% |
| 1948 | 4,644 | 54.65% | 3,688 | 43.40% | 165 | 1.94% |
| 1952 | 7,042 | 70.04% | 2,999 | 29.83% | 13 | 0.13% |
| 1956 | 6,172 | 62.17% | 3,739 | 37.66% | 16 | 0.16% |
| 1960 | 5,774 | 59.24% | 3,970 | 40.73% | 2 | 0.02% |
| 1964 | 3,721 | 41.15% | 5,317 | 58.80% | 5 | 0.06% |
| 1968 | 4,792 | 58.60% | 2,971 | 36.33% | 415 | 5.07% |
| 1972 | 4,726 | 57.69% | 3,338 | 40.75% | 128 | 1.56% |
| 1976 | 4,361 | 47.52% | 4,646 | 50.62% | 171 | 1.86% |
| 1980 | 4,665 | 51.16% | 3,634 | 39.86% | 819 | 8.98% |
| 1984 | 4,341 | 50.75% | 4,154 | 48.57% | 58 | 0.68% |
| 1988 | 3,266 | 42.23% | 4,377 | 56.60% | 90 | 1.16% |
| 1992 | 2,404 | 31.02% | 3,688 | 47.59% | 1,658 | 21.39% |
| 1996 | 2,379 | 34.54% | 3,769 | 54.73% | 739 | 10.73% |
| 2000 | 3,191 | 44.09% | 3,830 | 52.92% | 217 | 3.00% |
| 2004 | 3,745 | 45.86% | 4,349 | 53.25% | 73 | 0.89% |
| 2008 | 3,051 | 37.70% | 4,822 | 59.58% | 220 | 2.72% |
| 2012 | 3,472 | 42.05% | 4,680 | 56.68% | 105 | 1.27% |
| 2016 | 4,375 | 54.28% | 3,179 | 39.44% | 506 | 6.28% |
| 2020 | 4,732 | 58.91% | 3,172 | 39.49% | 128 | 1.59% |
| 2024 | 4,744 | 62.01% | 2,782 | 36.37% | 124 | 1.62% |

== See also ==
- National Register of Historic Places listings in Floyd County, Iowa
- Parks in Floyd County, Iowa
- The Floyd County Court House, completed in 1940, is listed on the National Register of Historic Places.
