= Riverton Township, Clay County, Iowa =

Township in Iowa, US

Riverton Township
- Township
- Location in Clay County
- Coordinates: 43°07′41″N 095°13′11″W
- Country: United States
- State: Iowa
- County: Clay

Area
  - Total: 31.01 sq mi (80.31 km^{2})
  - Land: 31.0 sq mi (80.2 km^{2})
  - Water: 0.042 sq mi (0.11 km^{2}) 0.14%
- Elevation: 1,322 ft (403 m)

Population (2000)
  - Total: 321
  - Density: 10/sq mi (4/km^{2})
- GNIS feature ID: 0468623

Riverton Township is a township in Clay County, Iowa, USA. As of the 2000 census, its population was 321.

== History ==
Riverton Township was created in 1874.

== Geography ==
Riverton Township covers an area of 31.01 square miles (80.3 km^{2}) and contains no incorporated settlements.

The streams of Spring Creek and Stony Creek run through this township.

== Transportation ==
Riverton Township contains one airport or landing strip, Spencer Municipal Airport.
