= Floyd, Iowa =

- City
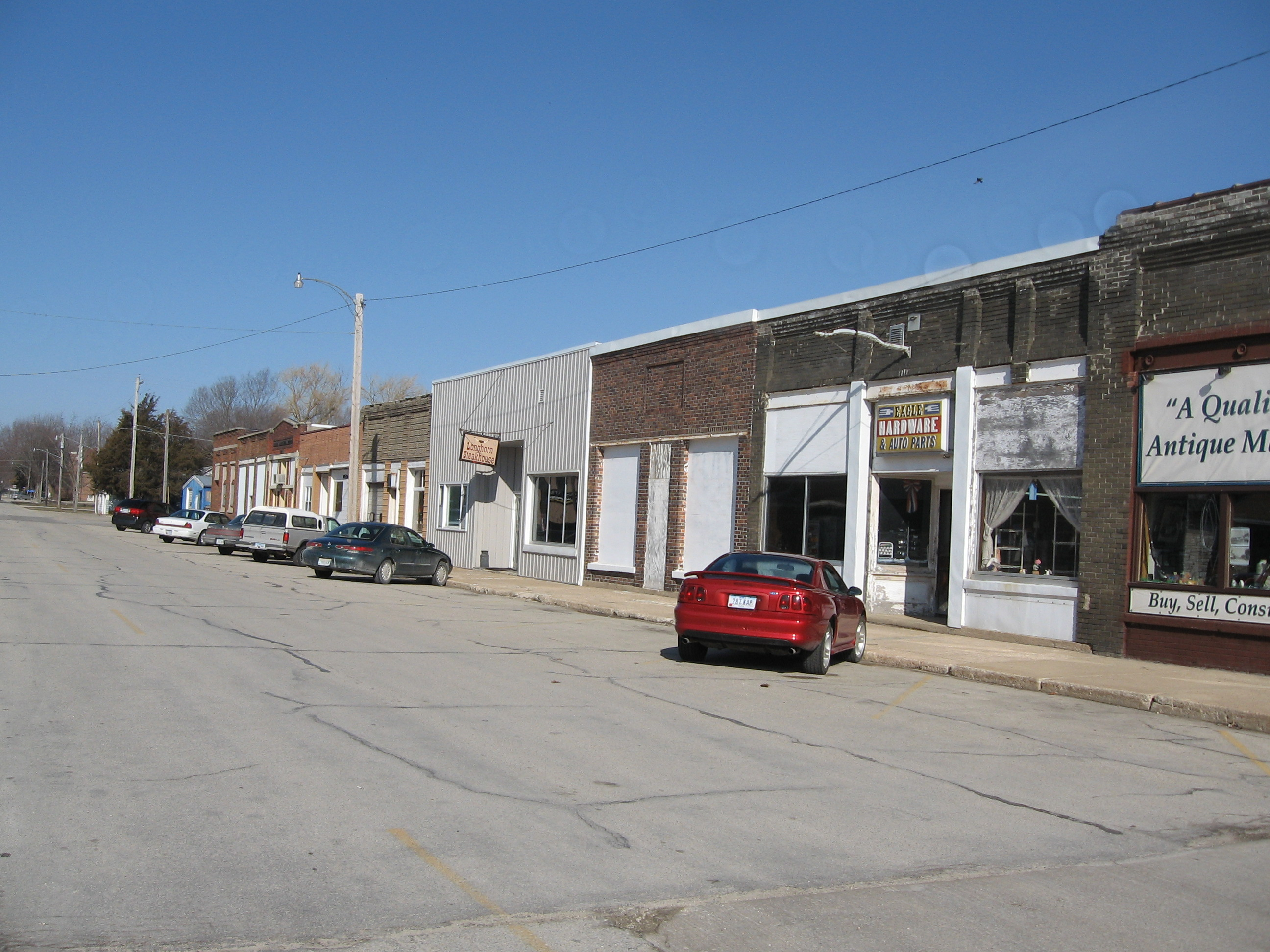
- Downtown Floyd

- Location of Floyd, Iowa
- Coordinates: 43°07′33″N 92°44′22″W
- Country: USA
- State: Iowa
- County: Floyd
- Incorporated: February 26, 1899

Area
  - Total: 0.55 sq mi (1.43 km^{2})
  - Land: 0.55 sq mi (1.43 km^{2})
  - Water: 0 sq mi (0.00 km^{2})
- Elevation: 1,066 ft (325 m)

Population (2020)
  - Total: 313
  - Density: 566.8/sq mi (218.84/km^{2})
- Time zone: UTC-6 (Central (CST))
  - Summer (DST): UTC-5 (CDT)
- ZIP code: 50435
- Area code: 641
- FIPS code: 19-28020
- GNIS feature ID: 2394778

Floyd is a city in Floyd County, Iowa, United States. The population was 313 at the time of the 2020 census.

== History ==
Floyd is named for Charles Floyd of Lewis and Clark fame, as was Floyd County. The Floyd post office opened in 1855.

== Geography ==
According to the United States Census Bureau, the city has a total area of 0.60 square miles (1.55 km^{2}), all land.

== Demographics ==
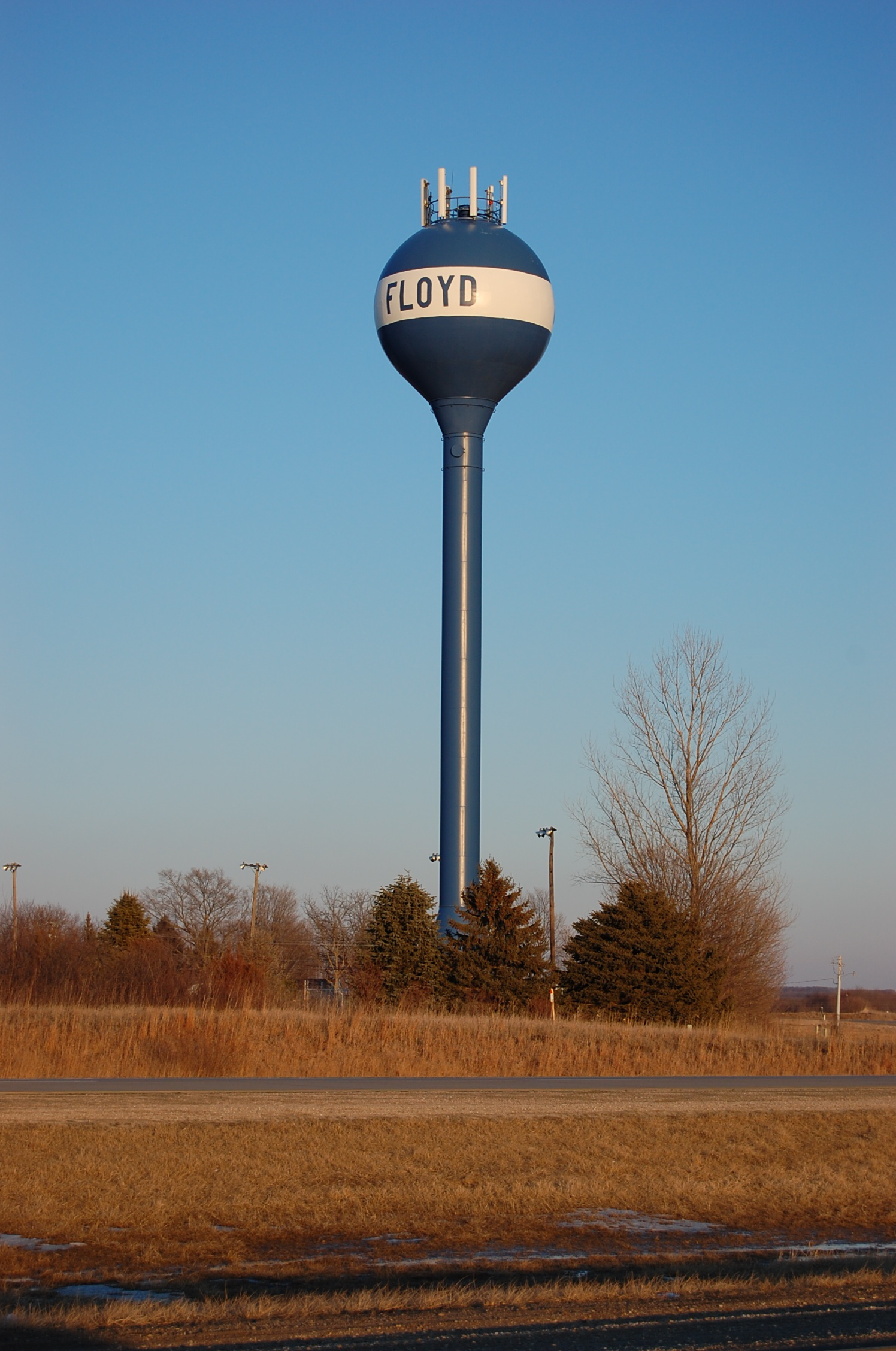
Water Tower in Floyd, Iowa

Historical populations
Year	Pop.	±%
1880	279	—
1900	353	+26.5%
1910	332	−5.9%
1920	308	−7.2%
1930	350	+13.6%
1940	352	+0.6%
1950	440	+25.0%
1960	401	−8.9%
1970	380	−5.2%
1980	408	+7.4%
1990	359	−12.0%
2000	361	+0.6%
2010	335	−7.2%
2020	313	−6.6%
Source:"U.S. Census website". United States Census Bureau. and Iowa Data Center; Source: U.S. Decennial Census

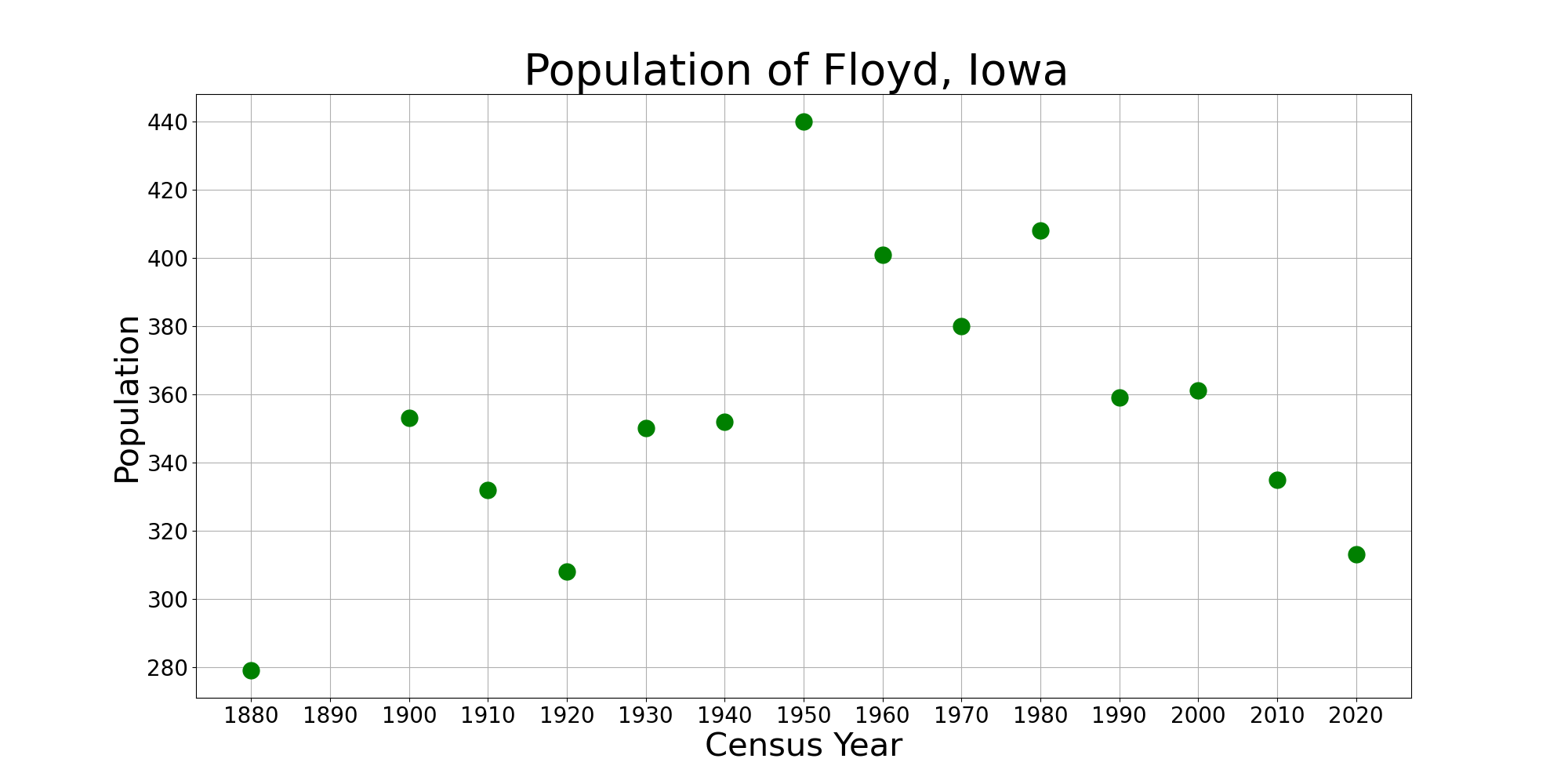
The population of Floyd, Iowa from US census data

=== 2020 census ===
As of the census of 2020, there were 313 people, 140 households, and 93 families residing in the city. The population density was 566.8 inhabitants per square mile (218.8/km^{2}). There were 143 housing units at an average density of 259.0 per square mile (100.0/km^{2}). The racial makeup of the city was 92.3% White, 0.3% Black or African American, 1.3% Native American, 0.0% Asian, 0.0% Pacific Islander, 1.0% from other races and 5.1% from two or more races. Hispanic or Latino persons of any race comprised 2.9% of the population.

Of the 140 households, 28.6% of which had children under the age of 18 living with them, 52.1% were married couples living together, 5.0% were cohabitating couples, 22.1% had a female householder with no spouse or partner present and 20.7% had a male householder with no spouse or partner present. 33.6% of all households were non-families. 32.9% of all households were made up of individuals, 15.0% had someone living alone who was 65 years old or older.

The median age in the city was 45.3 years. 24.6% of the residents were under the age of 20; 3.2% were between the ages of 20 and 24; 21.4% were from 25 and 44; 26.8% were from 45 and 64; and 24.0% were 65 years of age or older. The gender makeup of the city was 50.5% male and 49.5% female.

=== 2010 census ===
As of the census of 2010, there were 335 people, 140 households, and 98 families living in the city. The population density was 558.3 inhabitants per square mile (215.6/km^{2}). There were 149 housing units at an average density of 248.3 per square mile (95.9/km^{2}). The racial makeup of the city was 98.8% White, 0.6% from other races, and 0.6% from two or more races. Hispanic or Latino of any race were 0.3% of the population.

There were 140 households, of which 27.1% had children under the age of 18 living with them, 61.4% were married couples living together, 4.3% had a female householder with no husband present, 4.3% had a male householder with no wife present, and 30.0% were non-families. 24.3% of all households were made up of individuals, and 10.7% had someone living alone who was 65 years of age or older. The average household size was 2.39 and the average family size was 2.81.

The median age in the city was 46.4 years. 21.2% of residents were under the age of 18; 5.8% were between the ages of 18 and 24; 21.6% were from 25 to 44; 29.7% were from 45 to 64; and 22.1% were 65 years of age or older. The gender makeup of the city was 52.5% male and 47.5% female.

=== 2000 census ===
As of the census of 2000, there were 361 people, 142 households, and 102 families living in the city. The population density was 612.7 inhabitants per square mile (236.6/km^{2}). There were 147 housing units at an average density of 249.5 per square mile (96.3/km^{2}). The racial makeup of the city was 99.17% White, 0.55% Asian, and 0.28% from two or more races.

There were 142 households, out of which 33.1% had children under the age of 18 living with them, 62.0% were married couples living together, 4.2% had a female householder with no husband present, and 27.5% were non-families. 23.2% of all households were made up of individuals, and 11.3% had someone living alone who was 65 years of age or older. The average household size was 2.54 and the average family size was 2.99.

In the city, the population was spread out, with 24.4% under the age of 18, 9.4% from 18 to 24, 23.8% from 25 to 44, 29.4% from 45 to 64, and 13.0% who were 65 years of age or older. The median age was 40 years. For every 100 females, there were 108.7 males. For every 100 females age 18 and over, there were 99.3 males.

The median income for a household in the city was $35,096, and the median income for a family was $36,458. Males had a median income of $28,021 versus $18,438 for females. The per capita income for the city was $14,723. About 3.1% of families and 6.4% of the population were below the poverty line, including 10.6% of those under age 18 and 12.5% of those age 65 or over.

== Education ==
The Charles City Community School District operates area public schools.

== See also ==
- Howardville Wesleyan Church
