= Rockford, Iowa =

- City
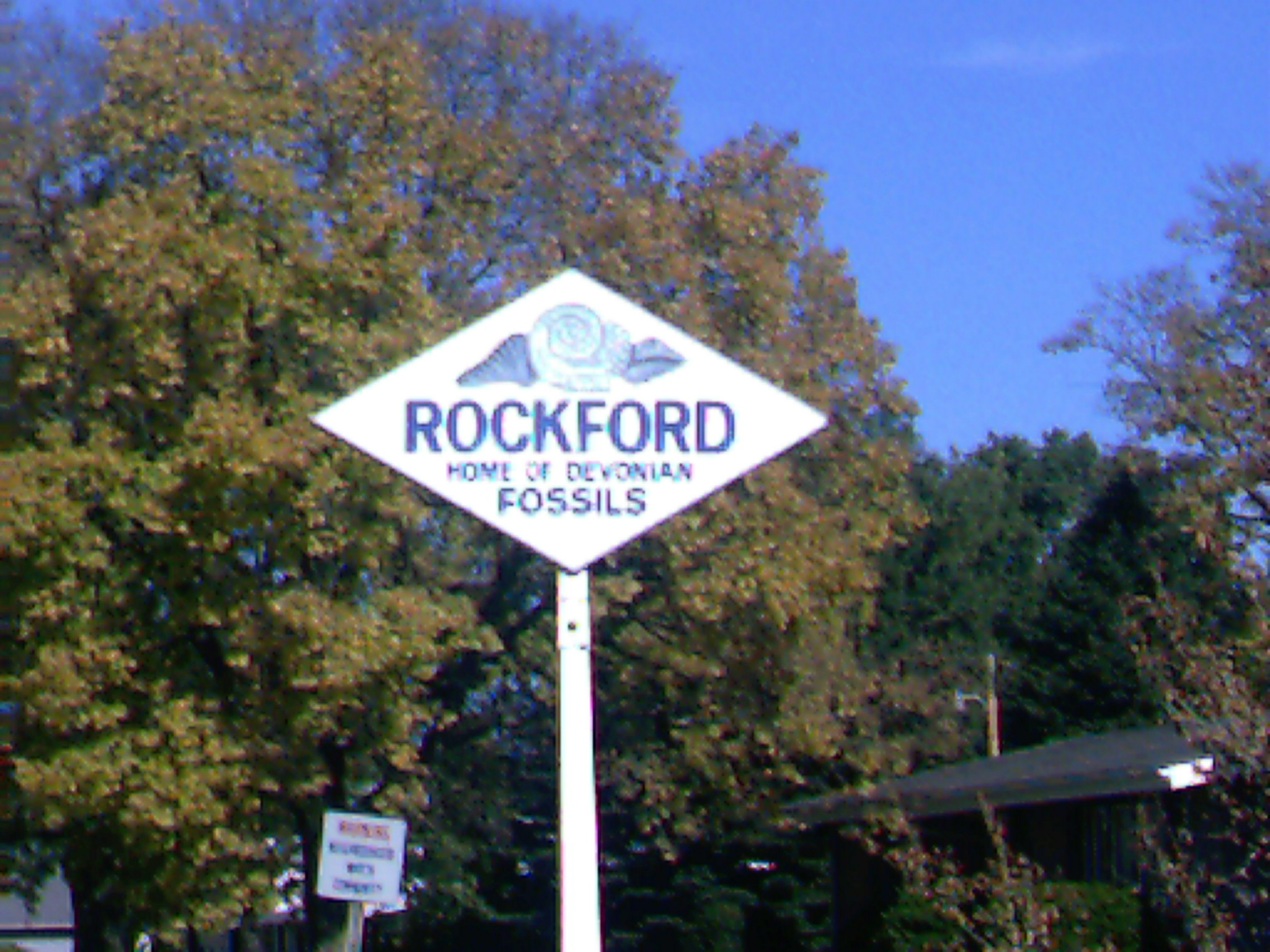
- Rockford IA Logo Road sign
- Motto: Home of the Devonian Fossils
- Location of Rockford, Iowa
- Coordinates: 43°03′09″N 92°56′52″W
- Country: USA
- State: Iowa
- County: Floyd
- Incorporated: March 19, 1878

Area
  - Total: 0.62 sq mi (1.61 km^{2})
  - Land: 0.62 sq mi (1.61 km^{2})
  - Water: 0 sq mi (0.00 km^{2})
- Elevation: 1,004 ft (306 m)

Population (2020)
  - Total: 758
  - Density: 1,217.4/sq mi (470.05/km^{2})
- Time zone: UTC-6 (Central (CST))
  - Summer (DST): UTC-5 (CDT)
- ZIP code: 50468
- Area code: 641
- FIPS code: 19-68070
- GNIS feature ID: 2396407
- Website: rockfordiowa.org

Rockford is a city in Floyd County, Iowa, United States, at the confluence of the Shell Rock and Winnebago rivers. The population was 758 at the time of the 2020 census. Rockford's post office opened in 1855.

== Geography ==
Rockford's longitude and latitude coordinates
in decimal form are 43.052833, -92.949203.

According to the United States Census Bureau, the city has a total area of 0.63 square miles (1.63 km^{2}), all land.

== Demographics ==
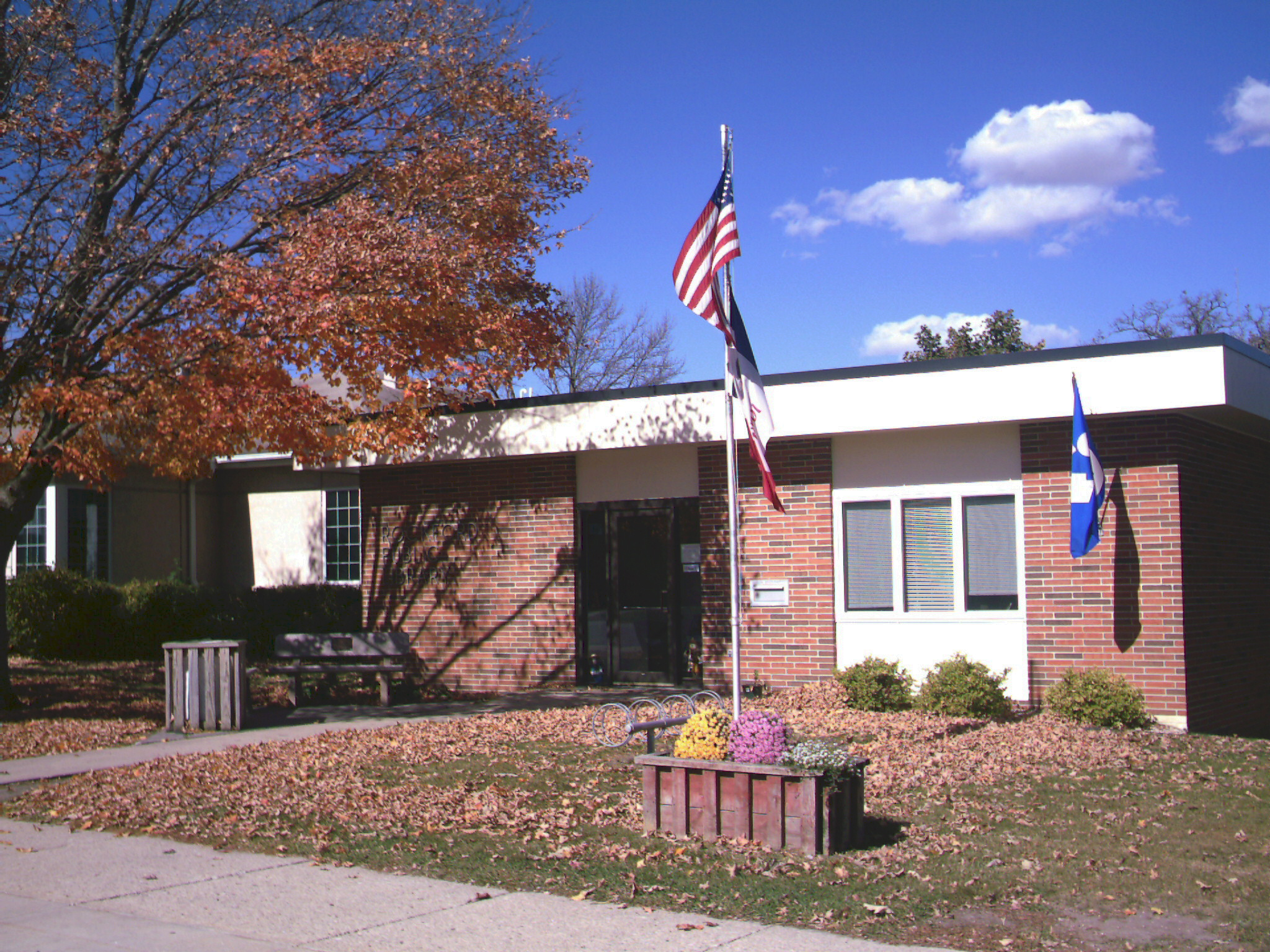
Rockford public library in the fall of 2010

Historical populations
Year	Pop.	±%
1880	739	—
1890	1,010	+36.7%
1900	1,080	+6.9%
1910	916	−15.2%
1920	1,031	+12.6%
1930	996	−3.4%
1940	1,054	+5.8%
1950	979	−7.1%
1960	941	−3.9%
1970	902	−4.1%
1980	1,012	+12.2%
1990	863	−14.7%
2000	907	+5.1%
2010	860	−5.2%
2020	758	−11.9%
Source:"U.S. Census website". United States Census Bureau. and Iowa Data Center; Source: U.S. Decennial Census

=== 2020 census ===
As of the census of 2020, there were 758 people, 332 households, and 205 families residing in the city. The population density was 1,217.4 inhabitants per square mile (470.0/km^{2}). There were 390 housing units at an average density of 626.4 per square mile (241.8/km^{2}). The racial makeup of the city was 94.3% White, 1.1% Black or African American, 0.3% Native American, 0.3% Asian, 0.1% Pacific Islander, 0.5% from other races and 3.4% from two or more races. Hispanic or Latino persons of any race comprised 1.2% of the population.

Of the 332 households, 24.4% of which had children under the age of 18 living with them, 47.9% were married couples living together, 6.3% were cohabitating couples, 28.3% had a female householder with no spouse or partner present and 17.5% had a male householder with no spouse or partner present. 38.3% of all households were non-families. 33.4% of all households were made up of individuals, 14.8% had someone living alone who was 65 years old or older.

The median age in the city was 44.3 years. 24.5% of the residents were under the age of 20; 3.8% were between the ages of 20 and 24; 22.7% were from 25 and 44; 29.8% were from 45 and 64; and 19.1% were 65 years of age or older. The gender makeup of the city was 49.6% male and 50.4% female.

=== 2010 census ===
As of the census of 2010, there were 860 people, 374 households, and 235 families living in the city. The population density was 1,365.1 inhabitants per square mile (527.1/km^{2}). There were 417 housing units at an average density of 661.9 per square mile (255.6/km^{2}). The racial makeup of the city was 99.1% White, 0.2% African American, 0.1% Native American, 0.1% Asian, and 0.5% from two or more races. Hispanic or Latino of any race were 0.1% of the population.

There were 374 households, of which 30.7% had children under the age of 18 living with them, 48.1% were married couples living together, 10.7% had a female householder with no husband present, 4.0% had a male householder with no wife present, and 37.2% were non-families. 32.1% of all households were made up of individuals, and 13.4% had someone living alone who was 65 years of age or older. The average household size was 2.30 and the average family size was 2.90.

The median age in the city was 39.8 years. 25.5% of residents were under the age of 18; 8% were between the ages of 18 and 24; 24% were from 25 to 44; 24.8% were from 45 to 64; and 17.8% were 65 years of age or older. The gender makeup of the city was 48.6% male and 51.4% female.

=== 2000 census ===
As of the census of 2000, there were 907 people, 380 households, and 248 families living in the city. The population density was 1,439.5 inhabitants per square mile (555.8/km^{2}). There were 417 housing units at an average density of 661.8 per square mile (255.5/km^{2}). The racial makeup of the city was 98.57% White, 0.33% African American, 0.11% Native American, and 0.99% from two or more races. Hispanic or Latino of any race were 0.33% of the population.

There were 380 households, out of which 31.6% had children under the age of 18 living with them, 51.1% were married couples living together, 11.3% had a female householder with no husband present, and 34.7% were non-families. 30.8% of all households were made up of individuals, and 16.6% had someone living alone who was 65 years of age or older. The average household size was 2.39 and the average family size was 2.94.

In the city, the population was spread out, with 27.9% under the age of 18, 8.2% from 18 to 24, 25.8% from 25 to 44, 20.5% from 45 to 64, and 17.6% who were 65 years of age or older. The median age was 36 years. For every 100 females, there were 94.2 males. For every 100 females age 18 and over, there were 85.3 males.

The median income for a household in the city was $32,143, and the median income for a family was $40,875. Males had a median income of $30,288 versus $20,417 for females. The per capita income for the city was $15,455. About 8.0% of families and 11.9% of the population were below the poverty line, including 23.3% of those under age 18 and 5.7% of those age 65 or over.

== Education ==
The Rudd-Rockford-Marble Rock Community School District operates area public schools.

== Geology ==
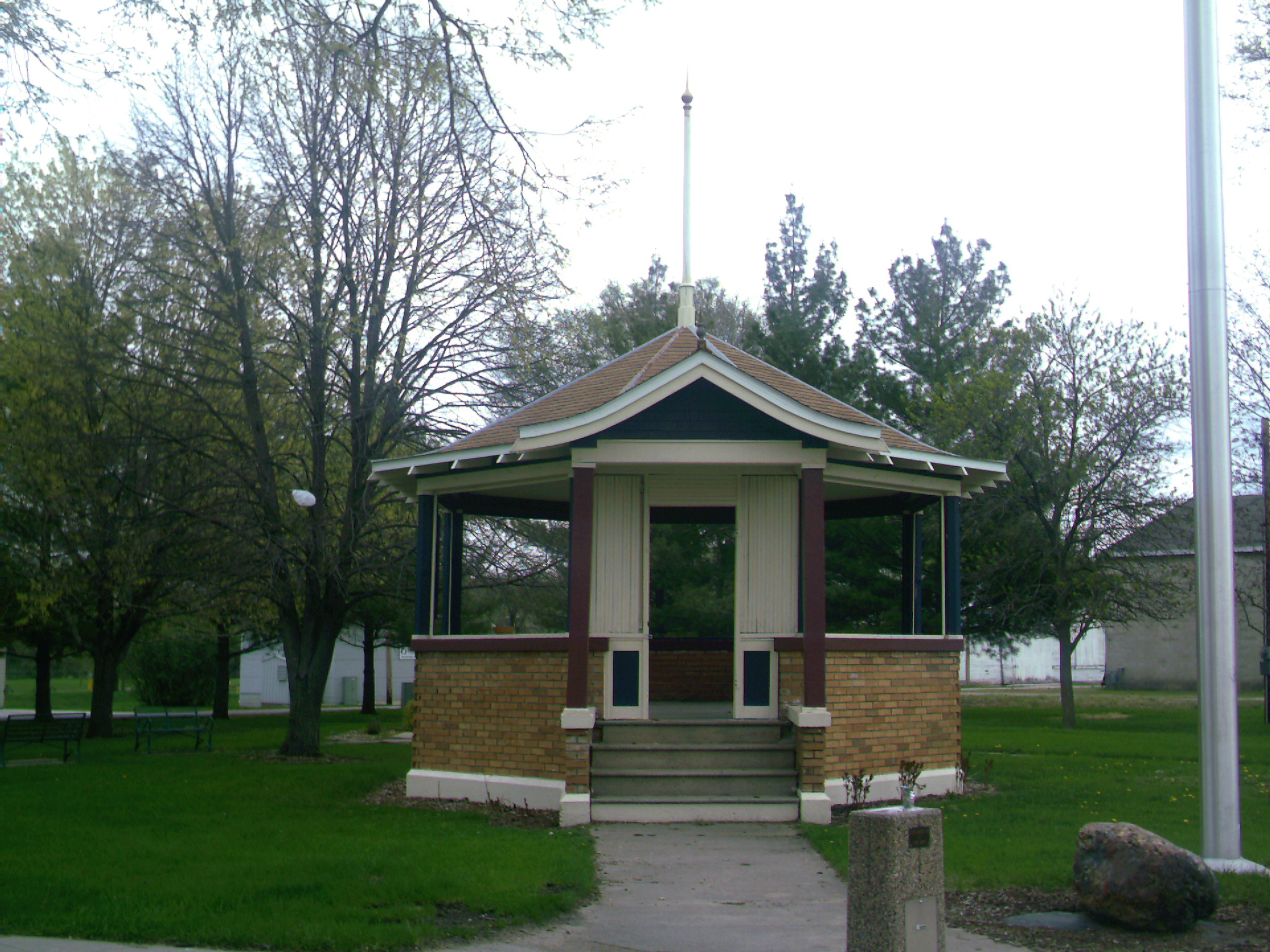
Rockford central park gazebo

Rockford is in close proximity to a world-class fossil collecting locale. The Floyd County Fossil and Prairie Park Center is a nature center located just west of Rockford. Originally a clay pit for the now-defunct Rockford Brick and Tile Company, the Floyd County acquired the property in 1990 and it is currently open to the public as a County Park.

A great number of fossil marine species are present within the Devonian strata of the Park, but the abundance of brachiopods is noteworthy. What makes this location special is that the calcareous ocean-bottom sediment that was deposited here never turned to hard stone as it does almost everywhere else in the region. This allows the fossils to weather out as discrete, often complete museum-grade specimens.

== Notable people ==
- Jeremy Davies, actor
- Fred (1876–1932) and August Duesenberg (1879–1955), automobile manufacturers
- Robert James Waller (1939–2017) Dean of the School of Business at University of Northern Iowa

== See also ==
- Shell Rock River
- Winnebago River
