= Deerfield Township, Chickasaw County, Iowa =

Deerfield Township
- Township
- Location in Chickasaw County
- Coordinates: 43°09′19″N 092°29′53″W
- Country: United States
- State: Iowa
- County: Chickasaw

Area
  - Total: 53.64 sq mi (138.92 km^{2})
  - Land: 53.64 sq mi (138.92 km^{2})
  - Water: 0 sq mi (0 km^{2}) 0%
- Elevation: 1,122 ft (342 m)

Population (2000)
  - Total: 417
  - Density: 7.8/sq mi (3/km^{2})
- GNIS feature ID: 0467696

Deerfield Township is one of twelve townships in Chickasaw County, Iowa, USA. As of the 2000 census, its population was 417.

== History ==
Deerfield Township was organized in 1856.

== Geography ==
Deerfield Township covers an area of 53.64 square miles (138.9 km^{2}) and contains no incorporated settlements. According to the USGS, it contains one cemetery, Deerfield.

The stream of Elk Creek runs through this township.
