= Dayton Township, Butler County, Iowa =

Township in Iowa, US

Dayton Township, Butler County
- Township
- Coordinates: 42°51′37″N 092°44′23″W
- Country: United States
- State: Iowa
- County: Butler

Area
  - Total: 36.59 sq mi (94.76 km^{2})
  - Land: 36.20 sq mi (93.76 km^{2})
  - Water: 0.38 sq mi (0.99 km^{2})
- Elevation: 958 ft (292 m)

Population (2020)
  - Total: 277
  - Density: 7.5/sq mi (2.9/km^{2})
- FIPS code: 19-90903
- GNIS feature ID: 0467683

Dayton Township is one of sixteen townships in Butler County, Iowa, United States. As of the 2020 census, its population was 277.

== Geography ==
Dayton Township covers an area of 36.59 square miles (94.8 km^{2}) and contains no incorporated settlements. According to the USGS, it contains one cemetery, Coldwater.
