= Cedar Township, Mitchell County, Iowa =

Township in Mitchell County, Iowa, U.S.

Coordinates: 43.2428°N 92.9028°W

Cedar Township is a township in Mitchell County, Iowa, United States.

== History ==
Cedar Township was established in 1857.
