= Coldwater Township, Butler County, Iowa =

Township in Iowa, US

Coldwater Township, Butler County
- Township
- Coordinates: 42°51′57″N 092°50′42″W
- Country: United States
- State: Iowa
- County: Butler

Area
  - Total: 36.23 sq mi (93.84 km^{2})
  - Land: 36.1 sq mi (93.5 km^{2})
  - Water: 0.13 sq mi (0.34 km^{2})
- Elevation: 1,020 ft (311 m)

Population (2020)
  - Total: 1,286
  - Density: 35/sq mi (13.7/km^{2})
- FIPS code: 19-90753
- GNIS feature ID: 0467631

Coldwater Township is one of sixteen townships in Butler County, Iowa, United States. As of the 2020 census, its population was 1,286.

== Geography ==
Coldwater Township covers an area of 36.23 square miles (93.8 km^{2}) and contains one incorporated settlement, Greene. According to the USGS, it contains seven cemeteries: Brethren, Hardemen, Haselroad, Rose Hill, Saint Marys Catholic, South Vilmar and Wilmar.
