= Rudd-Rockford-Marble Rock Community School District =

Public school district in Rockford, Iowa, United States

Coordinates: 43.051441°N 92.932971°W

Location
- Rockford, Iowa Floyd County, Cerro Gordo and Mitchell counties United States
- Coordinates: 43.051441, -92.932971

District information
- Type: Local school district
- Grades: K-12
- Established: 1959
- Superintendent: Ken Kaspar
- Schools: 2
- Budget: $6,799,000 (2020-21)
- NCES District ID: 1924960

Students and staff
- Students: 422 (2022-23)
- Teachers: 33.07 FTE
- Staff: 29.95 FTE
- Student–teacher ratio: 12.769
- Athletic conference: Top of Iowa
- District mascot: Warriors
- Colors: Blue and White

Other information
- Website: rockford.k12.ia.us

Rudd-Rockford-Marble Rock Community School District (RRMR) is a rural public school district headquartered in Rockford, Iowa. It operates the RRMR Elementary School/Preschool and RRMR Junior-Senior High School, both in Rockford.

The district is mostly in Floyd County with sections in Cerro Gordo and Mitchell counties. In addition to Rockford, it serves Marble Rock and Rudd.

== History ==
In 2008, Keith Turner became the principal of the RRMR secondary school, and he was named superintendent, with his secondary principal duties continuing, in 2014.

In 2017, Turner asked the school board to consider enacting an agreement with another school district to share superintendents. The district is also, as a way to reduce expenses, considering establishing a solar panel array. At the time the district's enrollment and funding from the State of Iowa were decreasing, though Turner stated that the finances were in "pretty good shape".

== Schools ==
The district operates two schools in a single building in Rockford:

- RRMR Elementary School
- Rockford Jr.-Sr. High School

=== Rockford Jr.-Sr. High School ===
==== Athletics ====
The Warriors participate in the Top of Iowa Conference in the following sports:

- Football
- Cross Country
- Volleyball
- Basketball
- Bowling
- Wrestling
- Golf
  - Boys' 2000 Class 1A State Champions
- Track and Field
- Baseball
- Softball

== See also ==
- List of school districts in Iowa
- List of high schools in Iowa
