= Charles City Community School District =

Public school district in Charles City, Iowa, United States

Coordinates: 43.067704°N 92.671322°W

Location
- Charles City, Iowa Floyd and Chickasaw counties United States
- Coordinates: 43.067704, -92.671322

District information
- Type: Local school district
- Grades: K-12
- Superintendent: Dr. Brian Burnight
- Schools: 4
- Budget: $25,076,000 (2020-21)
- NCES District ID: 1907080

Students and staff
- Students: 1541 (2022-23)
- Teachers: 114.91 FTE
- Staff: 129.72 FTE
- Student–teacher ratio: 13.41
- Athletic conference: Northeast Iowa
- District mascot: Comets
- Colors: Orange and Black

Other information
- Website: www.charlescityschools.org

The Charles City Community School District, or Charles City Schools is a public school district headquartered in Charles City, Iowa.

Occupying sections of Floyd and Chickasaw counties, it serves Charles City, Colwell, Floyd, and the surrounding rural areas.

Mike Fisher has been the superintendent since 2018, after serving as principal of Hoover Middle School in Waterloo.

== Campuses ==
The district operates four schools, all located in Charles City:

- Lincoln Elementary School
- Washington Elementary School
- Charles City Middle School
- Charles City High School

== See also ==
- List of school districts in Iowa
