= Northwest Conference (Iowa) =

Former Iowa High School athletic conference

The Northwest Conference was a high school athletic conference in Iowa. Over the years membership ranged anywhere from five to nine schools. The conference was known over the years as one of the best 1A basketball conferences in Iowa. Traditional powers Newell-Fonda and Pomeroy-Palmer combined for 14 state appearances and six state titles between 1990 and 2004. The conference also sponsored volleyball, women's basketball, men's and women's golf, men's and women's track, baseball, softball, and cross country.

== Former Members ==
Institution	Location	Mascot	Colors	Affiliation	Current Conference
Albert City-Truesdale	Albert City	Hurricanes		Public	Closed middle and high schools in 2004. Sends students to Sioux Central, who competes in the Twin Lakes Conference.
Alta	Alta	Cyclones		Public	Consolidated with Aurelia in 2011 to form Alta-Aurelia, who competes in the Twin Lakes Conference.
Aurelia	Aurelia	Bulldogs		Public	Consolidated with Alta in 2011 to form Alta-Aurelia, who competes in the Twin Lakes Conference.
Laurens–Marathon	Laurens	Chargers		Public	Closed the high school in 2015. Sends students to Pocahontas Area, who competes in the Twin Lakes Conference.
Newell-Fonda	Newell	Mustangs		Public	Twin Lakes Conference
Pomeroy–Palmer	Pomeroy	Knights		Public	Absorbed by Pocahontas Area in 2008, who competes in the Twin Lakes Conference.
Sac City	Sac City	Indians		Public	Consolidated with WLVA in 2007 to form East Sac County, who competes in the Twin Lakes Conference.
Schaller-Crestland	Schaller	Wildcats		Public	Began sharing sports with Galva–Holstein in 2009. Now competes in the Western Valley Activities Conference as Ridge View.
Sioux Central	Sioux Rapids	Rebels		Public	Twin Lakes Conference
St. Mary's Catholic	Storm Lake	Panthers		Private	Twin Lakes Conference

== History ==
The Northwest Conference was formed for the 1996–97 athletic year. The conference was formed to meet the needs of nine small 1A schools located in the heart of Northwestern Iowa. After Alta and Aurelia ended a 7-year sports-only sharing agreement, the bigger Twin Lakes Conference was not seen as a good fit for them. Newell-Fonda, Pomeroy-Palmer, and Schaller-Crestland had long histories in the Bo-Coon conference, which had recently dissolved. So the conference was created in 1996 with three of the smaller Twin Lakes Conference schools (Alta, Aurelia, and Sac City), two Cornbelt conference schools who had been longtime rivals of Alta and Aurelia respectively (Sioux Central and Albert City-Truesdale), three old Bo-Coon schools who had recently merged with other nearby schools (Schaller-Crestland, Pomeroy-Palmer, and Newell-Fonda), and longtime independent Storm Lake St. Mary's.

After nearly a decade of stability and 1A basketball dominance, the conference lost one school, Albert City-Truesdale, in 2004. The school had originally planned to share sports and other activities with Sioux Central High School, but instead the district opted to close its high school. In 2008, there was another change in membership. Sac City left the conference, as they consolidated with WLVA to form East Sac County High School and joined the Twin Lakes. Another former Twin Lakes member, Laurens-Marathon, would replace them for the next season.

In 2008, the real attrition began. Pomeroy-Palmer left the conference to join with neighboring Pocahontas Area Community School District, reducing membership to seven. For the 2009–10 school year membership dipped to six, as Schaller-Crestland joined with neighboring Galva–Holstein Community School District for all sports but volleyball effective 2009–10 and began full-grade sharing in 2010–11. The final blow to the conference came the next season, as Alta and Aurelia reverted to sharing sports in 2010–11 and announced plans to combine high schools and middle schools in 2011–12. Throughout the final years of the conference, Sioux Central, which became easily the biggest school in the conference when it absorbed most of what was once the Albert City-Truesdale high school in 2005, actively campaigned for a bid to the Twin Lakes Conference. It attempted to leave the conference effective 2010–11 sports season in hopes of joining a league with larger schools, but was unable to find a home for their athletics teams so remained in the conference for another season. For the 2011–12 school year a merger with the Twin Lakes was announced and the five remaining members of the Northwest Conference joined the Twin Lakes as the new north/west division.

=== Storm Lake Jamboree ===
From the formation of the conference, the schools, in conjunction with the Storm Lake Times, sponsored an annual basketball preseason challenge held the weekend before the season tip-off. Each of the schools in the Northwest Conference played an exhibition game against another area school, one after another, until the night was capped with one Northwest Conference school (typically the preseason favorite) facing the host, much larger Lakes Conference member Storm Lake High School. The Jamboree was held for both boys and girls and although it did not count on any team's record, the exhibition games served to provide area teams a good idea of what to expect for the upcoming season.

=== Legacy ===
Beginning in the 2011–12 school year, all five Northwest Conference schools became members of the Twin Lakes Conference. The five schools remained associated as the conference's northern/western division.

== Athletic success ==
The Northwest Conference was noted for its successful Class 1A basketball teams for most of its history. Throughout the 15 years the conference existed five difference members qualified for the state basketball tournament, accumulating a total of 12 appearances 6 state titles during those years. The six state titles were tied for the most of any conference in the state over those 15 years. Most of the conference schools had great basketball traditions before joining the league as well. The following is a list of state qualifiers:

=== Men's basketball ===
- Alta, 2006
- Laurens-Marathon, 2009
- Newell-Fonda, 1997–1st, 1998, 1999–1st, 2000–1st, 2003–2nd, 2004–4th
- Pomeroy-Palmer, 1997, 2001–1st, 2002–1st
- St. Mary's, 2011–1st
- Early-Nemaha, 1970 –1st

=== Baseball ===
- Alta, 2009
- Alta-Aurelia, 2011
- Newell-Fonda, 2000, 2005
- Schaller-Crestland, 1999
- Sioux Central, 1997–2nd, 2003
- St. Mary's, 1997, 2002

=== Men's cross country ===
- Albert City-Truesdale, 2001 (with Laurens-Marathon as LM-ACT)
- Alta, 2004
- Alta-Aurelia, 2011
- Laurens-Marathon, 2008, 2009
- Sioux Central, 1997, 1998, 1999, 2005

=== Men's golf ===
- Newell-Fonda, 2008–2nd

=== Wrestling ===
- Aurelia, 2007 (with Galva–Holstein as A-G-H)
- Schaller-Crestland, 1999

=== Football ===
Note: Football was not a conference sport

- Albert City-Truesdale, 2002 (with Laurens-Marathon as LM-ACT)
- Alta, 2006, 2007, 2008, 2009
- Aurelia, 2001–2nd, 2002, 2003, 2006, 2007
- Laurens-Marathon, 2008, 2011
- Newell-Fonda, 1997, 1999, 2003, 2005, 2006, 2007, 2008, 2010, 2011
- Pomeroy-Palmer, 2001
- Schaller-Crestland, 2003
- Sioux Central, 2003, 2005, 2011

=== Women's basketball ===
- Newell-Fonda, 1997–2nd, 2000–2nd, 2003, 2008–2nd, 2010, 2011
- Sac City, 1998, 1999

=== Softball ===
- Albert City-Truesdale: 2002
- Newell-Fonda: 2005–4th, 2006–2nd, 2008–1st, 2009–2nd, 2010–2nd

=== Volleyball ===
- Alta, 2010
- Schaller-Crestland, 2008, 2009–2nd
