= Lynn Evans =

American politician

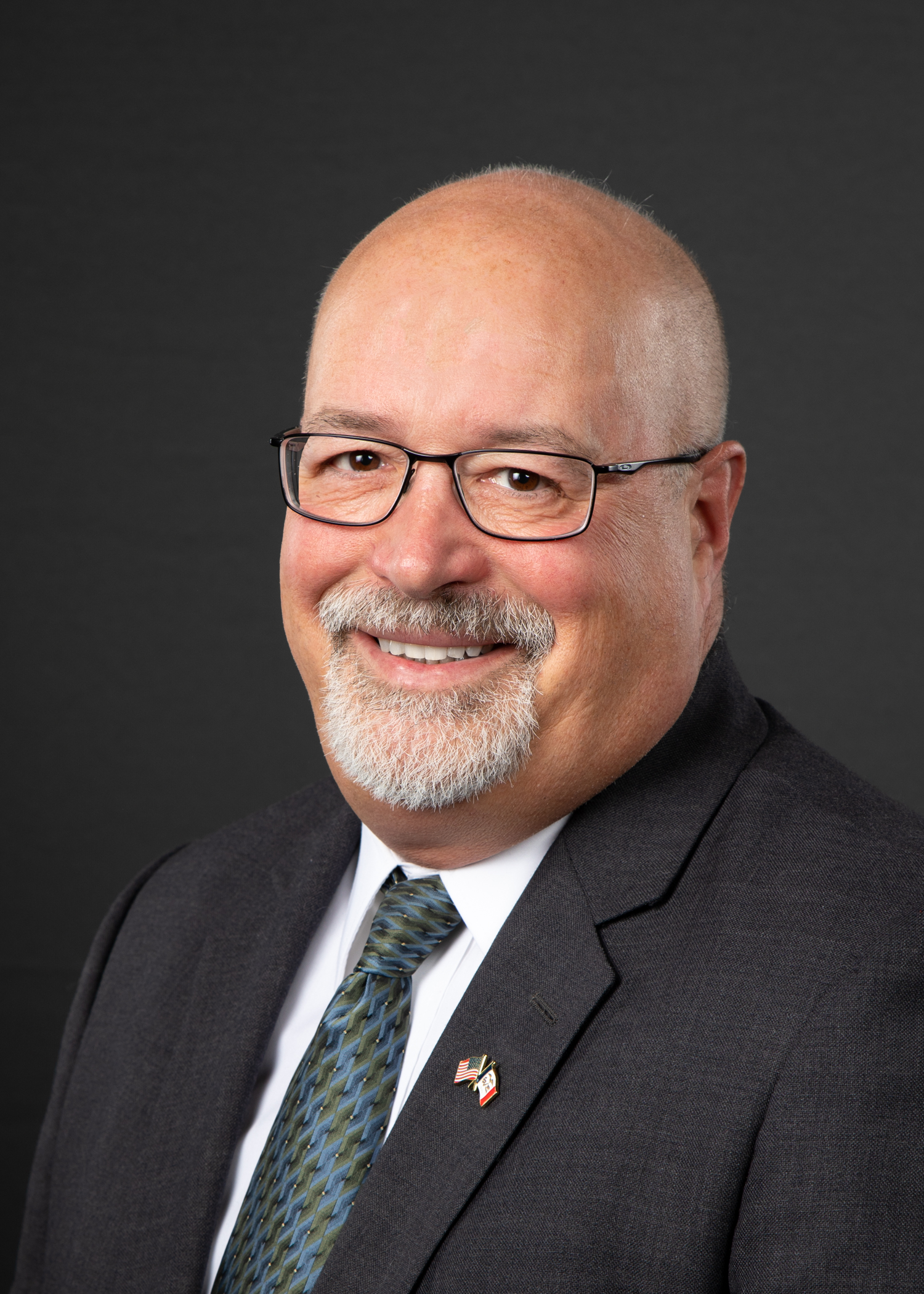

Member of the Iowa Senate from the 3rd district
- Incumbent
- Assumed office January 9, 2023
- Preceded by: Jim Carlin

Personal details
- Born: May 19, 1964 (age 62) Centerville, Iowa, U.S.
- Party: Republican
- Spouse: Midge
- Education: Westmar College (BS); Drake University (MA, EdS)

K. Lynn Evans (born May 19, 1964) is an American educator and politician.

== Education and teaching career ==
Evans graduated from Aurelia High School in Aurelia, Iowa, in 1982. He then completed his bachelor's degree in physical education and biology at Westmar College in 1986, followed by a master's in educational leadership and an educational specialist degree, both from Drake University, in 1996 and 2003, respectively. Evans served as superintendent of the Hartley–Melvin–Sanborn Community School District from 2003, then held a dual superintendency between H–M–S and the Aurelia Community School District from 2008 to 2010, before taking on an equivalent role between Alta and Aurelia Community School District between 2011 and 2018. The two districts merged to become Alta–Aurelia Community School District in 2018, and he remained superintendent of the newly created school district until 2019. Upon retiring as a full-time superintendent, Evans became a consultant for JMC, Inc. an educational software company, and an adjunct instructor with Buena Vista University.

== Political career ==
Evans contested the Republican Party primary in 2020 for the open seat in District 3 of the Iowa House of Representatives, losing to Dennis Bush. Evans was a candidate for the Iowa Senate during the 2022 election cycle. He defeated Anthony LaBruna in a Republican party primary for District 3, winning 64.7 percent of the vote to LaBruna's 35.1 percent. In the 2022 general election, Evans ran unopposed. During the campaign, Evans expressed support for gun rights, parental involvement in education, and the abolition of abortion.

== Personal life ==
Evans married Midge Loats, a native of Alta, in 1984. The couple raised two children and reside in Aurelia.
