= Aurelia Star =

Weekly newspaper of Aurelia and Alta in Iowa

- Type: Weekly newspaper
- Owner(s): Storm Lake Times
- Founder(s): A. L. Belew
- Founded: 1881; 144 years ago
- Language: English
- Ceased publication: 2025
- Headquarters: Storm Lake, Iowa
- Country: United States
- Circulation: 301
- Website: stormlake.com/aureliastar

The Aurelia Star was the local weekly newspaper of Aurelia and Alta in Iowa. It was first published in March 1881 as the Aurelia Sentinel and had changed ownership at least 11 times in its history. It ceased on Feb. 1, 2025.

== Precursors ==
Before the publication of the Aurelia Sentinel, two newspapers circulated in Aurelia, Iowa. One, the Gazette, was printed in Storm Lake, Iowa, beginning in 1878. The other newspaper was first named the Clincher until the owner, George L. Bailey, renamed it the Aurelia Independent. Both newspapers became defunct when the Aurelia Sentinel began publication.

== History ==
The Aurelia Sentinel was founded in March 1881. It was operated by A. L. Belew until 1891, when it was acquired by C. G. Bundy. In 1893, Bundy sold the newspaper to Bert Lloyd and his brother. Bert Lloyd became the sole owner in 1896. In 1909, Lloyd sold the newspaper to A. S. Crabb who in turn published it until May 7, 1912, when it was acquired by E. C. Lighter. Lighter published the newspaper until his death in 1948. In July 1950, Lighter's estate sold the Aurelia Sentinel to William H. Buist, a resident of Sioux City, Iowa. Buist sold the publication to Selene Lighter in 1950, who in turn sold it later that year to Robert S. and Helen Forbes on the occasion of Helen's birthday. Robert Forbes sold the newspaper to Laurence Ober of Schaller, Iowa in 1982.

Under the name Aurelia Star, the newspaper was purchased by Mid-America Publishing from Marcell Publishing in December 2016, and it was acquired by Storm Lake Times in 2020. The paper ceased publication on Feb. 1, 2025. This came after the Cherokee County Board of Supervisors elected not to name the Aurelia Star an official publication. The loss of revenue from public notices forced the paper to close. Moving forward, all Aurelia related news will be published in the Cherokee Chronicle Times or the Storm Lake Times Pilot.

== Format ==
During the first forty years of publication, each word was set by hand with one letter being used at a time. According to a book published in 1889, the Sentinel was considered a Republican newspaper. When the first Linotype machine came to Aurelia, the lines of text were set one at a time. In 1969, the Aurelia Sentinel transitioned to offset printing.

The newspaper was published on two to three days a week. On March 5, 1953, the newspaper was published in a tabloid format for the first time. The new format made the newspaper easier to operate and less congested by advertising. According to a 1973 report, the Aurelia Sentinel had 1,096 subscribers in 34 states.

== Archive ==
Copies of the newspaper are held at the State Historical Society of Iowa.
