= Iowa Highway 110 =

Highway in Iowa

Iowa Highway 110
- Iowa 110 highlighted in red

Route information
- Maintained by Iowa DOT
- Length: 14.789 mi (23.801 km)
- Existed: 1934–present

Major junctions
- South end: US 20 south of Schaller
- North end: Iowa 7 in Storm Lake

Location
- Country: United States
- State: Iowa
- Counties: Sac; Buena Vista

Highway system
- Iowa Primary Highway System; Interstate; US; State; Secondary; Scenic
← Iowa 107	→ Iowa 116

Iowa Highway 110 (Iowa 110) is a north–south state highway in northwestern Iowa. It is 15 miles (24 km) long. Iowa 110 begins at U.S. Highway 20 (US 20) south of Schaller and ends in Storm Lake at Iowa Highway 7.

== Route description ==
Iowa Highway 110 begins at U.S. Highway 20 2 miles (3.2 km) south of Schaller. It heads north through Schaller and through northwest Sac County, crossing into Buena Vista County near mile marker 6. Three miles into Buena Vista County, Iowa 110 turns to the east at Buena Vista County Road C65 (CR C65). For 2 1/2 miles (4.0 km), the route heads east, turning to the north again near the southwestern shore of Storm Lake. It continues north past the western shore for 2 miles (3.2 km) and negotiates an S-curve around the northwestern shore and into the city of Storm Lake. The highway ends at Iowa Highway 7 on the extreme western side of the city.

== History ==
Iowa Highway 110 was designated in 1934 on an old segment of Primary Road No. 4. Through the city of Storm Lake, the route followed the northern shore of Storm Lake; it ended at U.S. Highway 71 in the downtown area. By 1952, only the segment from U.S. Highway 20 to Schaller was paved. By 1956, the entire route was paved. By 1970, Iowa 110 was rerouted away from the downtown area to its current western end.

== Major intersections ==
County	Location	mi	km	Destinations	Notes
Sac	Eureka Township	0.000	0.000	US 20 – Fort Dodge, Sioux City	
Buena Vista	Storm Lake	14.789	23.801	Iowa 7 – Alta	
1.000 mi = 1.609 km; 1.000 km = 0.621 mi
