= Iowa Highway 7 =

State highway in Iowa, United States

Iowa Highway 7
- Iowa 7 highlighted in red

Route information
- Maintained by Iowa DOT
- Length: 73.661 mi (118.546 km)
- Existed: January 1, 1969–present

Major junctions
- West end: Iowa 3 near Aurelia
- US 71 at Storm Lake
- East end: US 169 at Fort Dodge

Location
- Country: United States
- State: Iowa
- Counties: Cherokee; Buena Vista; Pocahontas; Calhoun; Webster

Highway system
- Iowa Primary Highway System; Interstate; US; State; Secondary; Scenic
← US 6	→ Iowa 8

Iowa Highway 7 is a state highway that runs from east to west across the northwestern portion of Iowa. Highway 7 is a fair sized highway in Iowa, at 74 miles (119 kilometers) long. The western terminus of Iowa Highway 7 is at Iowa Highway 3 north of Aurelia. The eastern terminus of Iowa 7 is at U.S. Highway 169 near Fort Dodge.

== Route description ==
Iowa Highway 7 begins north of Aurelia at Iowa Highway 3. It goes south through Aurelia, then turns southeast to go through Alta. It continues southeast to Storm Lake, where it intersects Iowa Highway 110. After passing through Storm Lake, it intersects U.S. Highway 71 and goes south with U.S. 71 for 2 miles (3.2 km). Iowa 7 then turns east, passing through Newell and Fonda, before turning south again at an intersection with Iowa Highway 4. Iowa 7 and Iowa 4 go south through Pomeroy, before Iowa 7 turns east again. After passing through Manson, it continues east and ends at U.S. Highway 169 in northwestern Fort Dodge.

== History ==
This is the fourth state highway to be designated Iowa Highway 7. The first Iowa Highway 7 existed from 1919 to 1939 and was replaced by U.S. Route 32 in eastern Iowa and Iowa Highway 64 in western Iowa. The second Iowa Highway 7, a short spur from Iowa Highway 99 to Oakville existed from 1955 to 1957. The third Iowa Highway 7 existed from 1957 to 1969 when Iowa Highway 29 was redesignated.

The current Iowa Highway 7 route was designated in 1969. The eastern end was truncated in 1990 when U.S. Highway 20 was moved to a new freeway alignment south of Fort Dodge. Iowa Highway 7's former terminus was at U.S. 20, at what is now the corner of Kenyon Road and South 8th Street.

== Major intersections ==
County	Location	mi	km	Destinations	Notes
Cherokee	Afton Township	0.000	0.000	Iowa 3 – Cherokee, Marcus, Pocahontas	
Buena Vista	Storm Lake	14.247	22.928	Iowa 110 south – Schaller	
Buena Vista	Storm Lake	15.803	25.432	US 71 Bus. north (Lake Avenue)	Western end of US 71 Business overlap
Buena Vista	Storm Lake	19.031	30.627	US 71 north / US 71 Bus. ends – Spencer	Eastern end of US 71 Business; western end of US 71 overlap
Buena Vista	Hayes–Providence township line	20.886	33.613	US 71 south – Lake View	Eastern end of US 71 overlap
Pocahontas	Colfax–Bellville township line	45.466	73.170	Iowa 4 north – Pocahontas	Western end of Iowa 4 overlap
Calhoun	Butler–Sherman township line	50.392	81.098	Iowa 4 south – Rockwell City	Eastern end of Iowa 4 overlap
Webster	Fort Dodge	73.661	118.546	US 169 – Fort Dodge, Humboldt	
1.000 mi = 1.609 km; 1.000 km = 0.621 mi: Concurrency terminus
