= Aurelia High School =

Coordinates: 42.714°N 95.429°W

- 300 Ash St. Aurelia, Iowa; United States

Information
- Type: Public
- Status: closed
- School district: Aurelia Community School District
- Superintendent: Lynn Evans
- Principal: Tom Ryherd
- Enrollment: 92
- Colors: Blue, Green, and Silver
- Athletics conference: Twin Lakes
- Mascot: Bulldogs

Aurelia High School was the senior high school of Aurelia Community School. It is located in Aurelia, Iowa, a town in Cherokee County, Iowa, United States. Following the 2011-12 school year, Aurelia was one of the smallest schools in the state, with a 9-12 enrollment of around 90 students.

== Education ==
Aurelia had a National Honor Society program and was the smallest high school in the state with a DECA program.

== Music and speech ==
In 2003, Aurelia was recognized nationally as one of the 100 best music schools in the country. Two representatives were picked from each state, with Aurelia being one of Iowa's top two schools.

The Aurelia Jazz Band is widely recognized as one of the best in the state. In 2007, the Jazz Band won the Class 1A State Jazz Championship and in 2008, they finished second after making their eleventh consecutive appearance, and 18th overall. After failing to qualify in 2009, the jazz band made it back in 2010. One of the songs Aurelia performed in the 2007 competition was written specifically for Aurelia's jazz band, and is titled "A-Town Blues." The Aurelia Jazz Choir, directed by Deb Peterson, has also seen its share of success, qualifying for the State Showcase in 2007, 2008, and 2009. Aurelia finished 3rd all three years.

Aurelia's Speech department has also been very successful over the years, with the majority of speech students advancing to the state level over the past few years, and even had at least one act qualify for the All-State Showcase in every year from 2004-2009. The Speech department also puts on a play every fall, alternating between musical and comedy. The 2007 production was the world-famous "Rodgers & Hammerstein's Cinderella," which was seen as a major success by the drama department because of the lack casting available at Aurelia High School. Nearly half of the student body had some involvement in that particular production.

== Athletics ==
The athletics teams in Aurelia have been known as the Bulldogs throughout the years. This name dates back to at least the 1940s. The girls' teams were once called the Atoms before the short-lived athletics-only consolidation with Alta from 1990-1996. At the time, Aurelia was the only school in the state with nonrelated nicknames for the boys' and the girls' athletics teams. Aurelia has produced successful athletic teams over the years, most notably football. The football team had a ten-year run in the 8-man class that proved very successful. Aurelia made the playoffs in 2001 (Losing to Adair-Casey in the 8-man football championship), 2002, 2003, 2006, and 2007 and produced a 67-19 record from 2000-2008. After a 1-8 showing in 2009, Aurelia decided that it would share football with Alta High School in 2010. During a 4-year run near the beginning of the 8-man era, Aurelia was a perennial state title contender, being eliminated by the eventual state champion in 2001, 2002, 2003, and 2004, and accumulating just 5 losses in that period. Longtime coach Myron Radke, who retired after the 2008 football season, compiled a total of 156 victories and 83 losses in 24 seasons as a head football coach at Aurelia. Aurelia first made it to state in 1986, during Radke's hiatus. This season they were coached by Neil Phipps and made a run to the state title game, where they lost 6-0 to Paton-Churdan, the 1985 state champs. The '86 team included (among others) running back Ryan Kolpin, who holds many records for, and is a member of the athletics hall of fame at Coe College. Following this appearance Aurelia would not make it back to state until its 2001 runner-up season. In 2002 and 2003, Aurelia lost in the quarterfinals and semifinals, respectively. Falling in both years to Fenton Sentral High School.

Aurelia did not qualify for the playoffs in 2004 thanks to a rule that allowed only district champions to advance to state. In a year that produced what was arguably the second most talented team in Aurelia Bulldog history, Aurelia fell short at the hands of lRemsen St. Mary's in the next to last game of the season. St. Mary's stormed to victory in the 8-man class, beating Adair-Casey 56-8 in the most lopsided final to date.

Aurelia's basketball program also experience a lot of success in the 1960s, 1970s, and 1980s. Hall of Fame coach Duane Buttenob went 471-260 in 35 years as head coach, including state tournament appearances in 1973 and 1978 (during a time when there were just 2 classes for basketball and over 500 schools in the state) and an undefeated regular season in 1972. When he retired he ranked 7th all-time in IHSAA history in victories. However, Aurelia's basketball program has not fared too well since his retirement in 1988, posting only 5 winning seasons in the past 20 years.

Aurelia shares its wrestling program with Galva-Holstein and Schaller-Crestland. In the first 10 years of sharing, AGHSC has produced a State Dual Team Semifinalist and numerous individual state qualifiers. This sharing agreement will end in 2011-12, as Aurelia will share with Alta instead.

=== Golf ===
The golf teams have been very successful throughout the years. Both boys' and girls' golf coaches are members of the IHSAA Hall of Fame. The boys' golf teams have produced the school's only two athletics team state titles, claiming State Team Championships in 1989 as Aurelia in class A, and repeating in 1990 in class 3A as Alta-Aurelia. The '89 victory was a come-from-behind surprise with all 5 players contributing to the win.

The girls' team made state as recently as 2004, while the boys' team made it in 2003.

Aurelia also had a run of success in Track & Field throughout the 1980s and 1990s, claiming second at state in 1982, 1990, 1991, and 1992. The track team claimed the district title as recently as 2005.

== Future of Aurelia High School ==
Aurelia has been plagued by declining enrollment for a number of years, but due to sound financial management over the years, has been able to maintain a school while seeing class sizes fall to under 20 per graduating class. In the last 20 years, there has been much talk about sharing with other nearby schools. After a brief sports-only sharing agreement with nearby Alta High School that lasted from 1990-1996, Aurelia operated independently for another 13 years. Starting with baseball in 2009-10, Aurelia has again begun sharing some sports with Alta, who is a longtime sport rival. In 2010-11, the schools will share all sports but Volleyball and Softball and after much debate in the community, the schools will enter into whole-grade sharing in 2011-12, with Alta taking in all of Aurelia's high school students, Aurelia's high school housing the 7-8 grade for both schools. And each district maintaining separate K-6 buildings. There was a major concern about where the high school would be located in this full-grade sharing proposition at first since Alta is the bigger school, but has a substandard high school and Aurelia's facilities are all up to standard and in good condition. Still, Aurelia's building was seen as too small and Alta's recently built Middle School was seen as the best alternative, with a new wing for Music and Industrial Tech classes planned for construction this coming spring.
