= Northwest Conference (disambiguation) =

The Northwest Conference is a college athletic conference that competes in the NCAA's Division III.

Northwest Conference may also refer to:

- Northwest Intercollegiate Athletic Association, known as the Northwest Conference, a collegiate athletic conference in the Pacific Northwest of the United States founded in 1902.
- Northwest Conference (1908–1925), collegiate athletic conference in the Pacific Northwest of the United States
- Northwest Conference (Iowa), a high school athletic conference
- Northwest Conference (OHSAA), a high school athletic conference in Ohio

== See also ==
- Northwest Athletic Conference
