= Galva Township =

Galva Township may refer to the following places in the United States:

- Galva Township, Henry County, Illinois
- Galva Township, Ida County, Iowa
