= Galva =

Galva may refer to:

== Places ==
United States

- Galva, Illinois
- Galva, Iowa
- Galva, Kansas
