= Battle Township =

Battle Township may refer to the following places in the United States:

- Battle Township, Ida County, Iowa
- Battle Township, Beltrami County, Minnesota
