= Holstein, Iowa =

- City
- Motto: "Willkommen Freunde"
- Location of Holstein, Iowa
- Coordinates: 42°29′45″N 95°32′33″W
- Country: USA
- State: Iowa
- County: Ida

Area
  - Total: 1.58 sq mi (4.10 km^{2})
  - Land: 1.58 sq mi (4.08 km^{2})
  - Water: 0.0039 sq mi (0.01 km^{2})
- Elevation: 1,460 ft (450 m)

Population (2020)
  - Total: 1,501
  - Density: 951.8/sq mi (367.49/km^{2})
- Time zone: UTC-6 (Central (CST))
  - Summer (DST): UTC-5 (CDT)
- ZIP code: 51025
- Area code: 712
- FIPS code: 19-36840
- GNIS feature ID: 2394406
- Website: City of Holstein, Iowa

Holstein is a city in Ida County, Iowa, United States. The population was 1,501 in the 2020 census, a 2% increase from 1,470 in 2000.

== History ==
Holstein was founded in 1882. A large share of the early settlers being natives of Holstein, in Germany, caused the name to be selected. Holstein was incorporated as a city on April 25, 1883. The city celebrated its Quasquicentennial in June 2007 with a week-long series of events.

== Geography ==
According to the United States Census Bureau, the city has a total area of 1.50 square miles (3.88 km^{2}), of which 1.49 square miles (3.86 km^{2}) is land and 0.01 square miles (0.03 km^{2}) is water.

=== Climate ===
Climate data for Holstein, Iowa, 1991–2020 normals, extremes 2004–present
Month	Jan	Feb	Mar	Apr	May	Jun	Jul	Aug	Sep	Oct	Nov	Dec	Year
Record high °F (°C)	61 (16)	66 (19)	83 (28)	90 (32)	100 (38)	98 (37)	101 (38)	95 (35)	95 (35)	89 (32)	78 (26)	65 (18)	101 (38)
Mean maximum °F (°C)	46.6 (8.1)	51.1 (10.6)	70.2 (21.2)	82.1 (27.8)	90.2 (32.3)	92.1 (33.4)	91.5 (33.1)	89.3 (31.8)	88.0 (31.1)	81.9 (27.7)	68.1 (20.1)	51.0 (10.6)	94.9 (34.9)
Mean daily maximum °F (°C)	25.7 (−3.5)	30.9 (−0.6)	44.8 (7.1)	58.7 (14.8)	69.8 (21.0)	79.4 (26.3)	81.4 (27.4)	79.3 (26.3)	73.3 (22.9)	60.3 (15.7)	44.2 (6.8)	30.8 (−0.7)	56.5 (13.6)
Daily mean °F (°C)	17.1 (−8.3)	21.9 (−5.6)	34.6 (1.4)	47.2 (8.4)	59.3 (15.2)	69.4 (20.8)	72.2 (22.3)	70.2 (21.2)	62.6 (17.0)	49.8 (9.9)	34.7 (1.5)	22.3 (−5.4)	46.8 (8.2)
Mean daily minimum °F (°C)	8.6 (−13.0)	12.8 (−10.7)	24.5 (−4.2)	35.8 (2.1)	48.8 (9.3)	59.4 (15.2)	63.1 (17.3)	61.2 (16.2)	52.0 (11.1)	39.2 (4.0)	25.3 (−3.7)	13.8 (−10.1)	37.0 (2.8)
Mean minimum °F (°C)	−15.3 (−26.3)	−11.2 (−24.0)	2.3 (−16.5)	19.5 (−6.9)	34.0 (1.1)	48.4 (9.1)	52.5 (11.4)	50.1 (10.1)	37.8 (3.2)	22.0 (−5.6)	7.1 (−13.8)	−7.5 (−21.9)	−18.6 (−28.1)
Record low °F (°C)	−27 (−33)	−27 (−33)	−16 (−27)	5 (−15)	27 (−3)	44 (7)	45 (7)	44 (7)	31 (−1)	10 (−12)	−5 (−21)	−23 (−31)	−27 (−33)
Average precipitation inches (mm)	0.93 (24)	1.08 (27)	1.99 (51)	3.42 (87)	4.50 (114)	5.14 (131)	3.79 (96)	4.24 (108)	3.08 (78)	2.36 (60)	1.45 (37)	1.18 (30)	33.16 (843)
Average snowfall inches (cm)	6.9 (18)	8.9 (23)	5.3 (13)	2.1 (5.3)	0.2 (0.51)	0.0 (0.0)	0.0 (0.0)	0.0 (0.0)	0.0 (0.0)	0.3 (0.76)	3.5 (8.9)	8.1 (21)	35.3 (90.47)
Average precipitation days (≥ 0.01 in)	6.2	6.1	6.9	9.0	11.8	11.0	8.7	9.3	8.0	7.2	5.0	6.1	95.3
Average snowy days (≥ 0.1 in)	5.0	4.5	2.7	1.1	0.0	0.0	0.0	0.0	0.0	0.2	1.9	4.4	19.8
Source 1: NOAA
Source 2: NWS/XMACIS2 (mean maxima/minima 2006–2020)

== Demographics ==
Historical population
Census	Pop.	Note	%±
1890	539		—
1900	870		61.4%
1910	936		7.6%
1920	1,248		33.3%
1930	1,300		4.2%
1940	1,296		−0.3%
1950	1,336		3.1%
1960	1,413		5.8%
1970	1,445		2.3%
1980	1,477		2.2%
1990	1,449		−1.9%
2000	1,470		1.4%
2010	1,396		−5.0%
2020	1,501		7.5%
U.S. Decennial Census

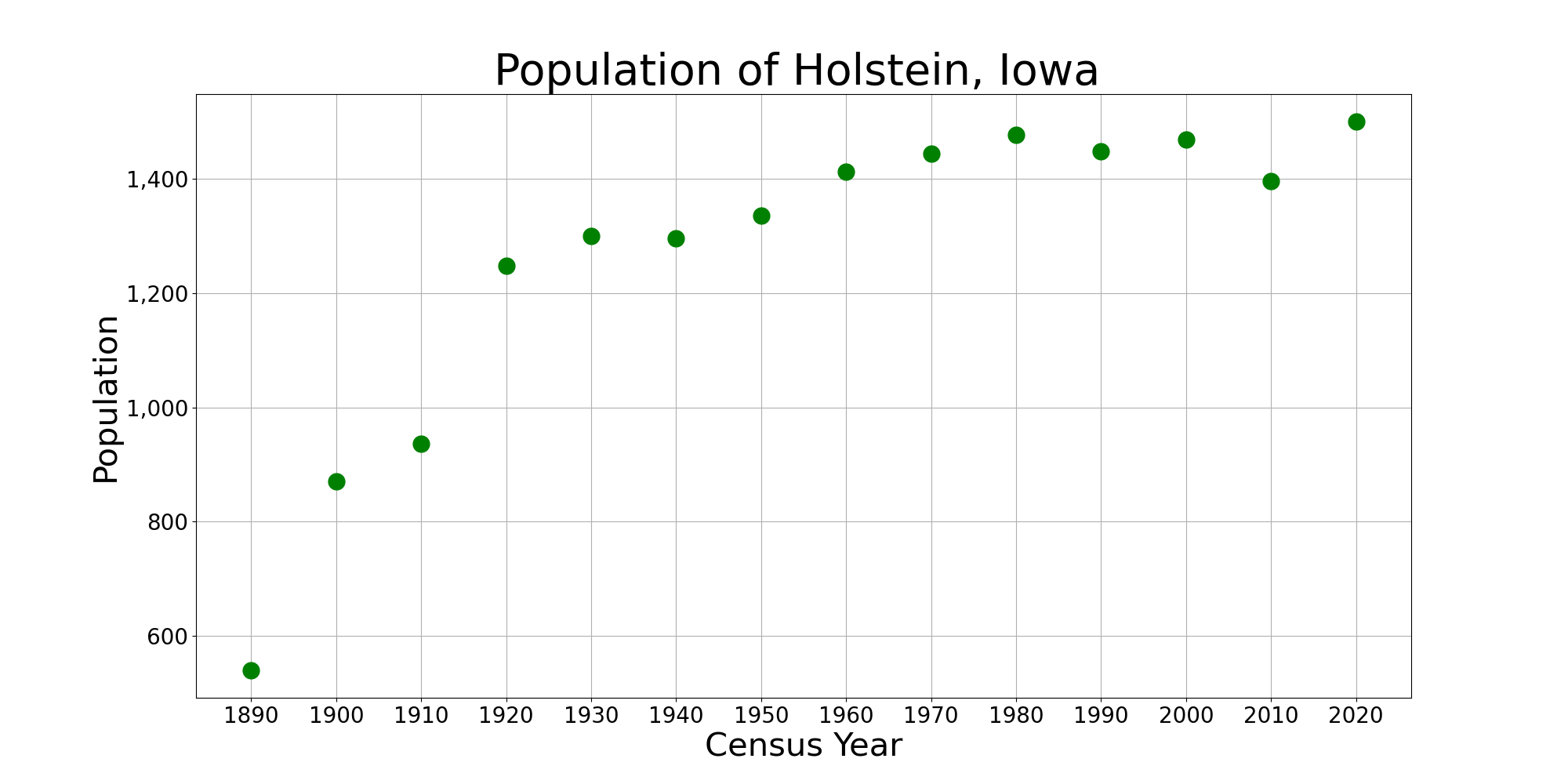
The population of Holstein, Iowa from US census data

=== 2020 census ===
As of the 2020 census, there were 1,501 people and 387 families residing in the city. The population density was 951.8 inhabitants per square mile (367.5/km^{2}). The housing-unit density was 451.5 per square mile (174.3/km^{2}).

The median age was 42.8 years. 22.5% of residents were under the age of 18 and 25.2% were 65 years of age or older. 24.0% of residents were under the age of 20; 5.9% were between the ages of 20 and 24; 22.9% were from 25 to 44; and 22.0% were from 45 to 64. For every 100 females there were 98.3 males, and for every 100 females age 18 and over there were 93.4 males age 18 and over. The gender makeup of the city was 49.6% male and 50.4% female.

0.0% of residents lived in urban areas, while 100.0% lived in rural areas.

There were 627 households, of which 26.3% had children under the age of 18 living in them. Of all households, 49.1% were married-couple households, 5.7% were cohabiting-couple households, 20.1% were households with a male householder and no spouse or partner present, and 25.0% were households with a female householder and no spouse or partner present. 38.3% of households were non-families. About 34.6% of all households were made up of individuals, and 16.3% had someone living alone who was 65 years of age or older.

There were 712 housing units, of which 11.9% were vacant. The homeowner vacancy rate was 2.6% and the rental vacancy rate was 13.5%.

Racial composition as of the 2020 census
Race	Number	Percent
White	1,389	92.5%
Black or African American	20	1.3%
American Indian and Alaska Native	2	0.1%
Asian	9	0.6%
Native Hawaiian and Other Pacific Islander	2	0.1%
Some other race	27	1.8%
Two or more races	52	3.5%
Hispanic or Latino (of any race)	100	6.7%

=== 2010 census ===
As of the census of 2010, there were 1,396 people, 616 households, and 354 families living in the city. The population density was 936.9 inhabitants per square mile (361.7/km^{2}). There were 674 housing units at an average density of 452.3 per square mile (174.6/km^{2}). The racial makeup of the city was 97.7% White, 0.1% African American, 0.2% Native American, 0.1% Asian, 0.7% from other races, and 1.1% from two or more races. Hispanic or Latino of any race were 2.0% of the population.

There were 616 households, of which 26.3% had children under the age of 18 living with them, 48.9% were married couples living together, 7.1% had a female householder with no husband present, 1.5% had a male householder with no wife present, and 42.5% were non-families. 37.3% of all households were made up of individuals, and 16.6% had someone living alone who was 65 years of age or older. The average household size was 2.18 and the average family size was 2.91.

The median age in the city was 44.1 years. 23.5% of residents were under the age of 18; 5.3% were between the ages of 18 and 24; 22.2% were from 25 to 44; 25.2% were from 45 to 64; and 23.7% were 65 years of age or older. The gender makeup of the city was 49.1% male and 50.9% female.

=== 2000 census ===
As of the census of 2000, there were 1,470 people, 627 households, and 406 families living in the city. The population density was 1,016.0 inhabitants per square mile (392.3/km^{2}). There were 674 housing units at an average density of 465.8 per square mile (179.8/km^{2}). The racial makeup of the city was 99.18% White, 0.07% Native American, 0.27% Asian, 0.07% from other races, and 0.41% from two or more races. Hispanic or Latino of any race were 0.34% of the population.

There were 627 households, out of which 27.3% had children under the age of 18 living with them, 55.3% were married couples living together, 7.5% had a female householder with no husband present, and 35.1% were non-families. 32.4% of all households were made up of individuals, and 19.1% had someone living alone who was 65 years of age or older. The average household size was 2.26 and the average family size was 2.84.

23.2% were under the age of 18, 6.4% from 18 to 24, 22.0% from 25 to 44, 20.4% from 45 to 64, and 28.0% were 65 years of age or older. The median age was 44 years. For every 100 females, there were 80.1 males. For every 100 females age 18 and over, there were 79.8 males.

The median income for a household in the city was $35,250, and the median income for a family was $43,636. Males had a median income of $30,259 versus $20,958 for females. The per capita income for the city was $17,941. About 5.7% of families and 9.1% of the population were below the poverty line, including 7.9% of those under age 18 and 13.1% of those age 65 or over.

== Education ==
The municipality is within the Galva–Holstein Community School District. It was established on July 1, 1980, by the merger of the merger of the Galva and Holstein school districts.

Circa 2010, Galva-Holstein began grade sharing with the Schaller-Crestland Community School District. This district cooperates with Schaller-Crestland, and the two have the collective name "Ridge View Community School District".

== Notable people ==
- Lauren K. Soth (1910–1998), journalist and editor who won the Pulitzer Prize award.
- Biggs Wehde (1906–1970), American Major League Baseball pitcher with the Chicago White Sox.
