= Alta High School =

Alta High School may refer to the following American schools:

- Alta High School (Iowa), Alta, Iowa
- Alta High School (Utah), Sandy, Utah
