= Cornbelt Conference =

Former High School athletic conference in Iowa

The Cornbelt Conference was one of the oldest high school athletic conferences in Iowa. Tracing its history to the 1930s, the Cornbelt has always been a conference filled by smaller schools. Beginning in the late 1970s, frequent membership changes happened because the league consisted of some of the smallest schools in the state. The conference had 6 teams, but four members left in 2014, and another explored options for whole grade sharing that would end its independent sports program. The conference disbanded in 2015.

== Members ==
Institution	Location	Mascot	Colors	Affiliation	9-11 Enrollment (2012-2013)	News
Clay Central-Everly	Everly	Mavericks		Public	72	Moved to the War Eagle Conference in 2015
Corwith-Wessley	Corwith	Panthers		Public	47	Began one-way sharing with Algona Community School District in 2014
Graettinger-Terril/Ruthven-Ayrshire	Graettinger	Titans		Public	63/52	Moved to the Twin Lakes Conference in 2014
Harris-Lake Park	Lake Park	Wolves		Public	65	Moved to the War Eagle Conference in 2014
North Union	Armstrong	Warriors		Public	159	Moved to the NIC in 2014
West Bend-Mallard	West Bend	Wolverines		Public	86	Moved to the Twin Lakes Conference in 2014

== History ==
=== Founding ===
The eight original members of the conference were Ruthven, Titonka, Swea City, Sioux Rapids, Marathon, West Bend, Terril, and Graettinger. In 1955, Mallard joined the league. Thompson and Armstrong followed in 1956. In 1958, Titonka, Armstrong, Swea City, and Thompson left the league, to help form the State Line Conference. Sioux Valley was created in 1959 from the consolidation of Peterson and Linn Grove, along with tiny rural districts Brooke, Cornell, and Highview, to become the eighth member of the Cornbelt Conference. Everly also joined the conference during the 1970s.

=== Increasing Instability ===
In 1981 the league added all six remaining members of the Clay Conference to the fold. Due to Marathon's departure in 1977 to join with Laurens, this left the league at 14 schools: the eight existing league schools, as well as Ayrshire, South Clay, Clay Central, Ocheyedan, Harris-Lake Park, and Arnolds Park. Still, many of the schools were quite small, and were weighing their options for further consolidation. After Sioux Rapids merged with Rembrandt in 1980, the Clay Conference began to look at other options. Throughout the 1980s, a series of mergers further changed the conference.

In 1984, the Ayrshire district began sending students elsewhere, then joined Ruthven to form Ruthven-Ayrshire Community School. Albert City-Truesdale joined the league from the Twin Lakes to keep membership at 14. The next season Ocheyedan left the league to merge with a larger school, Sibley. In 1987, Arnolds Park merged with Milford to form Okoboji High School. Clay Central and Everly began whole-grade sharing in 1989, leaving the conference with 11 members. In 1991, membership was boosted back to 14 despite Sioux Rapids-Rembrandt and Sioux Valley merging to become Sioux Central. The State Line Conference disbanded, leaving the Cornbelt to pick up league members Lincoln Central of Gruver, Armstrong-Ringsted, Sentral-Burt of Fenton, and North Kossuth of Swea City. Membership decreased back to 12 the next season as West Bend merged with Mallard and Lincoln Central left the conference after one season to merge with the much larger Estherville Community Schools. South Clay closed its high school in 1994, allowing its students to choose the school they wished to attend; most chose to attend Sioux Central. Membership dipped to eight in 1996–97. Albert City-Truesdale and Sioux Central left the league to help found the Northwest Conference. Meanwhile, Terril began sharing sports with Ruthven-Ayrshire under the name Lakeland.

=== Demise ===
The eight team league persisted until 2005, although there were some changes in sharing agreements. The Burt Community School ended its partnership with Sentral, and merged with Algona, leaving Sentral by itself. Ruthven-Ayrshire began competing once again without Terril. Terril, still hurting for numbers, entered into sports sharing agreement with Graettinger. In 2005, the conference expanded from 8 to 12 schools, as for the third time, it picked up members of a disbanding conference; namely, the North Star Conference and exiting members Vemtura, Twin River Valley (a merger of Twin Rivers of Bode and Gilmore City-Bradgate until 2010, when each went its separate way,) Corwith-Wesley/LuVerne (a long-term partnership, the two districts never formally merged,) and Woden-Crystal Lake/Titonka (another partnership, and absorbed by Forest City and Algona, respectively, in 2011.)

Despite this additional boost in membership, the league continued to dwindle as a result of successive consolidations. Sentral and North Kossuth merged in 2007, becoming North Sentral Kossuth. Twin River Valley left in 2010, and W-CL/T in 2011. In 2012, Ventura merged with Garner-Hayfield of the North Iowa Conference. Meanwhile, North Sentral Kossuth's merger agreement to share sports with Armstrong-Ringsted under the name North Union, and a similar agreement between Greattinger-Terril and Ruthven-Ayrshire, left the conference with just six members for the 2012–13 school year.

North Union, by far the largest school in the conference, immediately sought to find a new home for its athletic teams, and in 2014, it opted to join the North Iowa Conference. This move left the other schools in the undesirable position of operating a five-team conference. As a result, that same year, each of the five began applying to other leagues. G-T/R-A and West Bend-Mallard were accepted into the Twin Lakes (North Division) in 2014. Harris-Lake Park joined the War Eagle Conference, along with independent Trinity Christian of Hull; the next year, Clay Central-Everly followed suit. This left Corwith-Wesley/LuVerne which, despite the whole-grade arrangement, remained one of Iowa's smallest high schools. In 2015, the partnership formally ended; Corwith-Wesley dissolved and was absorbed by Algona, and LuVerne, though opting to remain a separate district, also joined Algona. The conference disbanded thereafter.
