= Grant Township, Ida County, Iowa =

Township in Iowa, USA

Coordinates: 42°15′N 95°30′W

Grant Township is a township in Ida County, Iowa, United States.
