= Ida County, Iowa =

County in Iowa, United States

- County
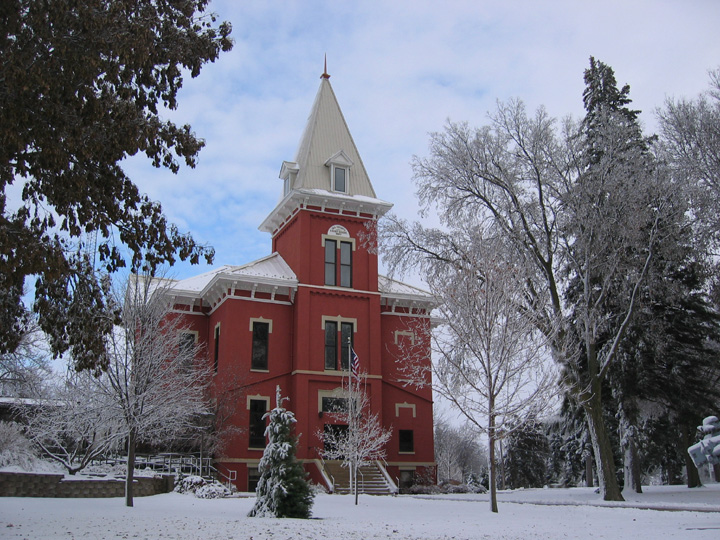
- The Ida County Courthouse in Ida Grove

- Location within the U.S. state of Iowa
- Coordinates: 42°23′12″N 95°30′52″W
- Country: United States
- State: Iowa
- Founded: January 15, 1851
- Seat: Ida Grove
- Largest city: Ida Grove

Area
  - Total: 432 sq mi (1,120 km^{2})
  - Land: 432 sq mi (1,120 km^{2})
  - Water: 0.5 sq mi (1.3 km^{2}) 0.1%

Population (2020)
  - Total: 7,005
  - Estimate (2025): 6,777 ▼
  - Density: 16.2/sq mi (6.26/km^{2})
- Time zone: UTC−6 (Central)
  - Summer (DST): UTC−5 (CDT)
- Congressional district: 4th
- Website: idacounty.iowa.gov
- Iowa county number 47

Ida County is a county located in the U.S. state of Iowa. As of the 2020 census the population was 7,005, making it the state's eighth-least populous county. The county seat is Ida Grove. The county was authorized by the Iowa Legislature in January 1851 as a packet of projected counties in unorganized territory of western Iowa. It was named after Ida Smith, the first child of European immigrants to be born in this region.

== History ==
The Iowa Legislature authorized the formation of 49 counties in previously–unregulated western Iowa on January 15, 1851. This date is usually cited as the date of formation of Ida County; however, as there were no inhabitants of that area, no action was taken to form a county government.

On January 12, 1853, the Legislature authorized creation of Woodbury County, and included the proviso that the area of Ida County be included with Woodbury for revenue, election, and judicial purposes. In 1853 there were still no settlers in Ida County's lands.

The county's first permanent settlers (Comstock and Moorehead) arrived in 1856. In 1858 the county government was organized, with John Moorehead appointed County Judge. There were about 40 county residents at that time.

The county's only postoffice, as well as the first courthouse, was operated from Judge Moorehead's house.

The county's first dedicated school building was raised in 1861.

The county's first newspaper, Ida County Pioneer, was started in 1872. The first bank opened in 1876. Railroads arrived in Ida County in 1877, when the Maple Valley branch of the Chicago & North Western Railway was built. This resulted in a flood of settlers, and within five years, nearly all the available land had been purchased.

== Geography ==
According to the U.S. Census Bureau, the county has a total area of 432 square miles (1,120 km^{2}), of which 432 square miles (1,120 km^{2}) is land and 0.5 square miles (1.3 km^{2}) (0.1%) is water.

=== Major highways ===
- U.S. Highway 20 – runs east–west through the northern part of the county, passing Holstein.
- U.S. Highway 59 – runs generally north–south through the center of the county, passing Ida Grove. Its exit at south county line is five miles east of its entry point on north county line.
- Iowa Highway 31 – cuts across the northwestern tip of Ida County, running southwest from Cherokee County to Woodbury County.
- Iowa Highway 175 – runs east–west through the southern part of the county, passing Ida Grove.

=== Adjacent counties ===
- Cherokee County (north)
- Sac County (east)
- Crawford County (south)
- Woodbury County (west)

== Demographics ==
Historical population
Census	Pop.	Note	%±
1860	43		—
1870	226		425.6%
1880	4,382		1,838.9%
1890	10,705		144.3%
1900	12,327		15.2%
1910	11,296		−8.4%
1920	11,689		3.5%
1930	11,933		2.1%
1940	11,047		−7.4%
1950	10,697		−3.2%
1960	10,269		−4.0%
1970	9,283		−9.6%
1980	8,908		−4.0%
1990	8,365		−6.1%
2000	7,837		−6.3%
2010	7,089		−9.5%
2020	7,005		−1.2%
2025 (est.)	6,777	▼	−3.3%
U.S. Decennial Census; 1790–1960 1900–1990; 1990–2000 2010–2020

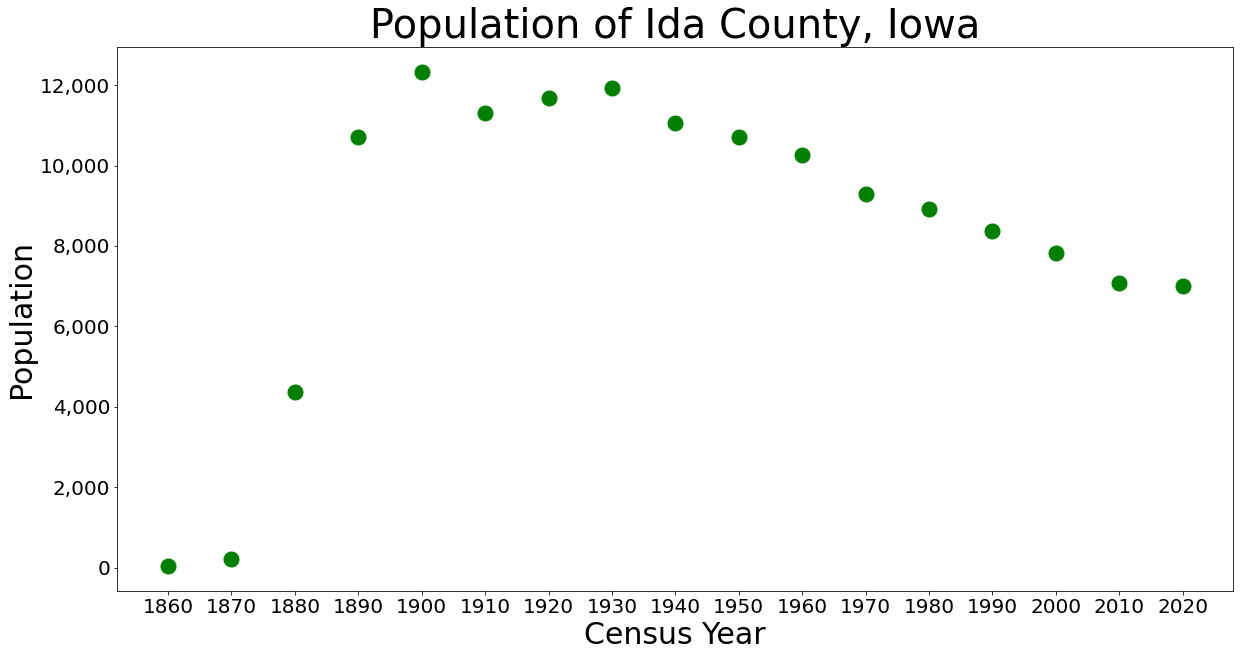
Population of Ida County from US census data

=== 2020 census ===
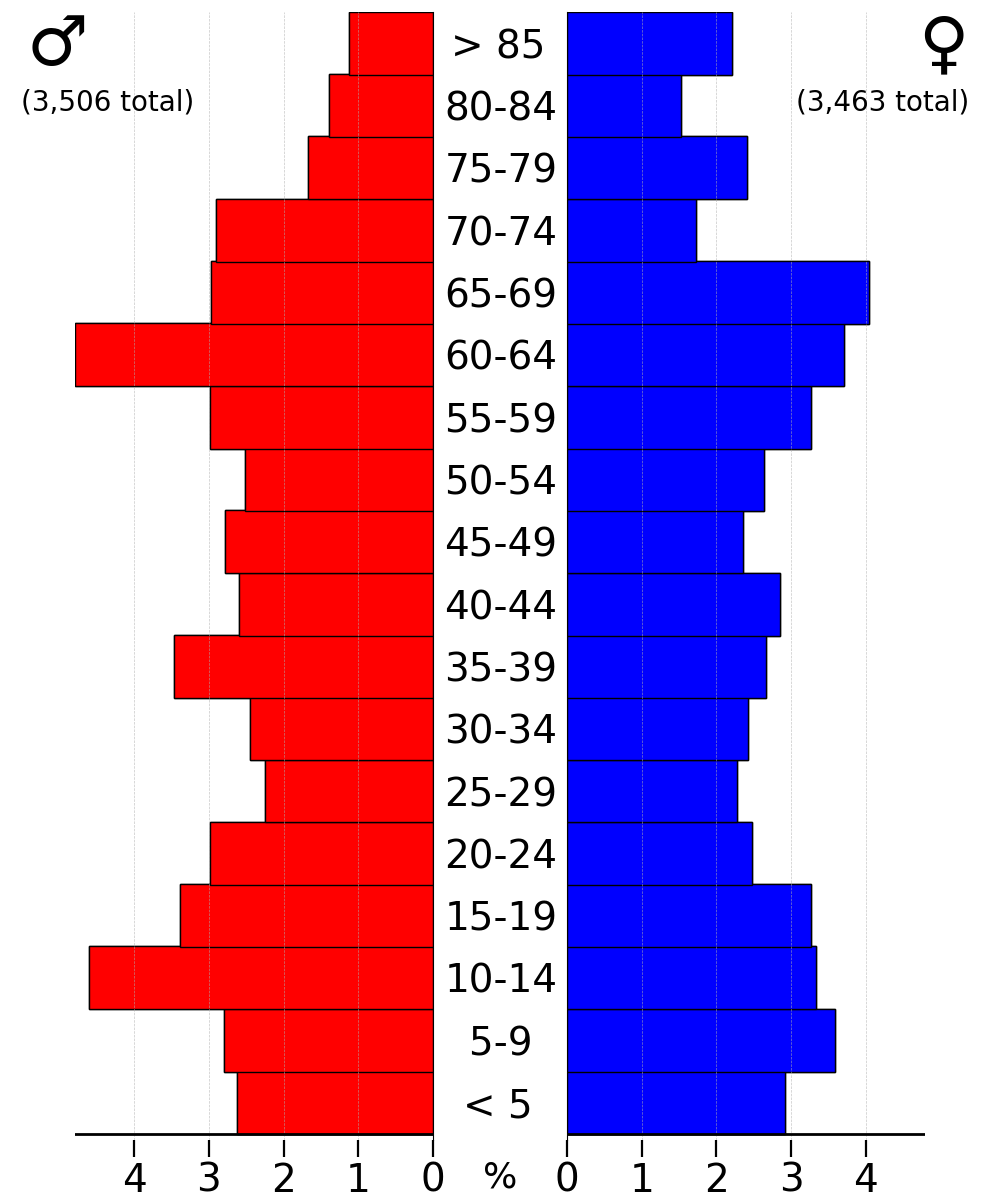
2022 US Census population pyramid for Ida County from ACS 5-year estimates

As of the 2020 census, the county had a population of 7,005, with a population density of 16.2/sq mi (6.3/km^{2}).

The median age was 44.1 years. 22.9% of residents were under the age of 18 and 23.2% were 65 years of age or older. For every 100 females there were 99.6 males, and for every 100 females age 18 and over there were 98.6 males age 18 and over.

Of all residents, 97.32% reported being of one race. The racial makeup of the county was 95.1% White, 0.4% Black or African American, 0.1% American Indian and Alaska Native, 0.3% Asian, 0.2% Native Hawaiian and Pacific Islander, 1.2% from some other race, and 2.7% from two or more races; Hispanic or Latino residents comprised 3.6% of the population, and 91.46% were non-Hispanic White.

Less than 0.1% of residents lived in urban areas, while 100.0% lived in rural areas.

There were 2,940 households in the county, of which 26.3% had children under the age of 18 living in them. Of all households, 51.6% were married-couple households, 19.8% were households with a male householder and no spouse or partner present, and 22.0% were households with a female householder and no spouse or partner present. About 31.0% of all households were made up of individuals and 14.7% had someone living alone who was 65 years of age or older.

There were 3,352 housing units, of which 12.3% were vacant. Among occupied housing units, 74.5% were owner-occupied and 25.5% were renter-occupied. The homeowner vacancy rate was 1.3% and the rental vacancy rate was 13.0%.

=== 2010 census ===
The 2010 census recorded a population of 7,089 in the county, with a population density of 16.4/sq mi (6.3/km^{2}). There were 3,426 housing units, of which 3,052 were occupied.

=== 2000 census ===
As of the census of 2000, there were 7,837 people, 3,213 households, and 2,184 families residing in the county. The population density was 18 people per square mile (6.9 people/km^{2}). There were 3,506 housing units at an average density of 8 units per square mile (3.1 units/km^{2}). The racial makeup of the county was 99.02% White, 0.10% Black or African American, 0.06% Native American, 0.24% Asian, 0.15% from other races, and 0.42% from two or more races. 0.47% of the population were Hispanic or Latino of any race.

There were 3,213 households, out of which 29.40% had children under the age of 18 living with them, 59.50% were married couples living together, 5.90% had a female householder with no husband present, and 32.00% were non-families. 29.30% of all households were made up of individuals, and 15.90% had someone living alone who was 65 years of age or older. The average household size was 2.39 and the average family size was 2.95.

In the county, the population was spread out, with 25.50% under the age of 18, 6.10% from 18 to 24, 24.00% from 25 to 44, 22.70% from 45 to 64, and 21.80% who were 65 years of age or older. The median age was 42 years. For every 100 females there were 93.90 males. For every 100 females age 18 and over, there were 91.40 males.

The median income for a household in the county was $34,805, and the median income for a family was $43,179. Males had a median income of $29,002 versus $19,417 for females. The per capita income for the county was $18,675. About 5.70% of families and 8.80% of the population were below the poverty line, including 9.10% of those under age 18 and 8.60% of those age 65 or over.

== Communities ==
=== Cities ===
- Arthur
- Battle Creek
- Galva
- Holstein
- Ida Grove

=== Unincorporated communities ===
Jalil Price land

=== Townships ===
- Battle
- Blaine
- Corwin
- Douglas
- Galva
- Garfield
- Grant
- Griggs
- Hayes
- Logan
- Maple
- Silver Creek

=== Population ranking ===
The population ranking of the following table is based on the 2020 census of Ida County.

† county seat

Rank	City/Town/etc.	Municipal type	Population (2020 Census)
1	† Ida Grove	City	2,051
2	Holstein	City	1,501
3	Battle Creek	City	700
4	Galva	City	435
5	Arthur	City	222

== Politics ==
United States presidential election results for Ida County, Iowa
Year	Republican		Democratic		Third party(ies)	
Year	No.	%	No.	%	No.	%
1896	1,475	50.36%	1,421	48.51%	33	1.13%
1900	1,599	54.22%	1,304	44.22%	46	1.56%
1904	1,565	60.66%	940	36.43%	75	2.91%
1908	1,367	52.98%	1,181	45.78%	32	1.24%
1912	530	18.98%	1,087	38.93%	1,175	42.08%
1916	1,412	51.12%	1,244	45.04%	106	3.84%
1920	3,547	75.73%	1,090	23.27%	47	1.00%
1924	2,033	43.46%	685	14.64%	1,960	41.90%
1928	2,486	52.77%	2,172	46.10%	53	1.13%
1932	1,452	27.99%	3,661	70.58%	74	1.43%
1936	1,834	34.39%	3,397	63.70%	102	1.91%
1940	3,166	57.70%	2,306	42.03%	15	0.27%
1944	2,640	57.38%	1,943	42.23%	18	0.39%
1948	2,257	48.04%	2,365	50.34%	76	1.62%
1952	3,800	70.14%	1,603	29.59%	15	0.28%
1956	3,226	60.75%	2,083	39.23%	1	0.02%
1960	3,290	62.77%	1,949	37.19%	2	0.04%
1964	1,977	40.48%	2,905	59.48%	2	0.04%
1968	2,753	62.21%	1,463	33.06%	209	4.72%
1972	2,819	64.67%	1,490	34.18%	50	1.15%
1976	2,590	56.86%	1,868	41.01%	97	2.13%
1980	2,825	64.88%	1,235	28.36%	294	6.75%
1984	2,618	62.30%	1,559	37.10%	25	0.59%
1988	1,951	51.63%	1,787	47.29%	41	1.08%
1992	1,714	40.43%	1,449	34.18%	1,076	25.38%
1996	1,684	45.12%	1,589	42.58%	459	12.30%
2000	1,968	56.37%	1,411	40.42%	112	3.21%
2004	2,342	62.06%	1,415	37.49%	17	0.45%
2008	2,036	57.40%	1,454	40.99%	57	1.61%
2012	2,286	62.41%	1,321	36.06%	56	1.53%
2016	2,655	73.50%	792	21.93%	165	4.57%
2020	2,880	74.82%	917	23.82%	52	1.35%
2024	2,771	75.81%	826	22.60%	58	1.59%

== Education ==
School districts include:

- Denison Community School District
- Galva-Holstein Community School District
- Maple Valley-Anthon Oto Community School District - Formed on July 1, 2012.
- Odebolt Arthur Battle Creek Ida Grove Community School District - Formed on July 1, 2018.
- River Valley Community School District
- Schaller-Crestland Community School District
- Schleswig Community School District

Former school districts:

- Battle Creek-Ida Grove Community School District - Merged into OABCIGCSD on July 1, 2018.
- Maple Valley Community School District - Merged into MVAOCSD on July 1, 2012.
- Odebolt-Arthur Community School District - Merged into OABCIGCSD on July 1, 2018.

== See also ==
- Ida County Courthouse
- National Register of Historic Places listings in Ida County, Iowa
- Waveland Round Barn, listed on the National Register of Historic Places
