= Garfield Township, Ida County, Iowa =

Township in Iowa, USA

Coordinates: 42°15′N 95°37′W

Garfield Township is a township in Ida County, Iowa, United States.
