= Eureka Township, Sac County, Iowa =

Coordinates: 42°31′N 95°20′W

Eureka Township is a township in Sac County, Iowa, United States. Schaller, Iowa is contained within Eureka Township.

== History ==
Eureka Township was founded in 1875. Through the late 19th and early 20th centuries, its population was a mixture of American-born and German-born residents. The township's name, meaning "I have found it," is said to refer to the good quality of the soil observed by early settlers. The name was proposed by A. P. Searle.

The Sioux City & Wall Lake branch of the Chicago and North Western Transportation Company used to run through Eureka Township. From 1875 to 1882, the post office of Mount Hope was within Eureka Township.

== Geography ==
Eureka Township is the northwesternmost township in Sac County. It has an area of 36.07 square miles and its elevation is 1417 feet above sea level. Eureka Township is in the Maple/Halfway Creek watershed.

== Demographics ==
As of the 2020 census, Eureka Township had a population of 881 in 398 households, and 403 total housing units. An estimated 728 residents were white, five were Black, 13 were Asian, four were Native Hawaiian or Pacific Islander, 86 were some other race, 16 were of two or more races. As of the 2019 American Community Survey, an estimated 164 residents were Hispanic or Latino of any race. As of the 2010 census, 772 residents lived in Schaller, while 169 lived in the remainder of Eureka Township.

== Education ==
Eureka Township is part of the Schaller-Crestland Community School District.

== Government ==
Eureka Township is represented in the Sac County Board of Supervisors by Ranell Drake of District 1. It is represented in the Iowa Senate by Republican Tim Kraayenbrink of District 4 and in the Iowa House of Representatives by Republican Michael V. Sexton of District 7. Eureka Township is represented in the United States House of Representatives by Republican Randy Feenstra of District 4.
