= Logan Township, Ida County, Iowa =

Township in Iowa, USA

Coordinates: 42°26′N 95°30′W

Logan Township is a township in Ida County, Iowa, United States.
