= Moorehead Stagecoach Inn =

- U.S. National Register of Historic Places
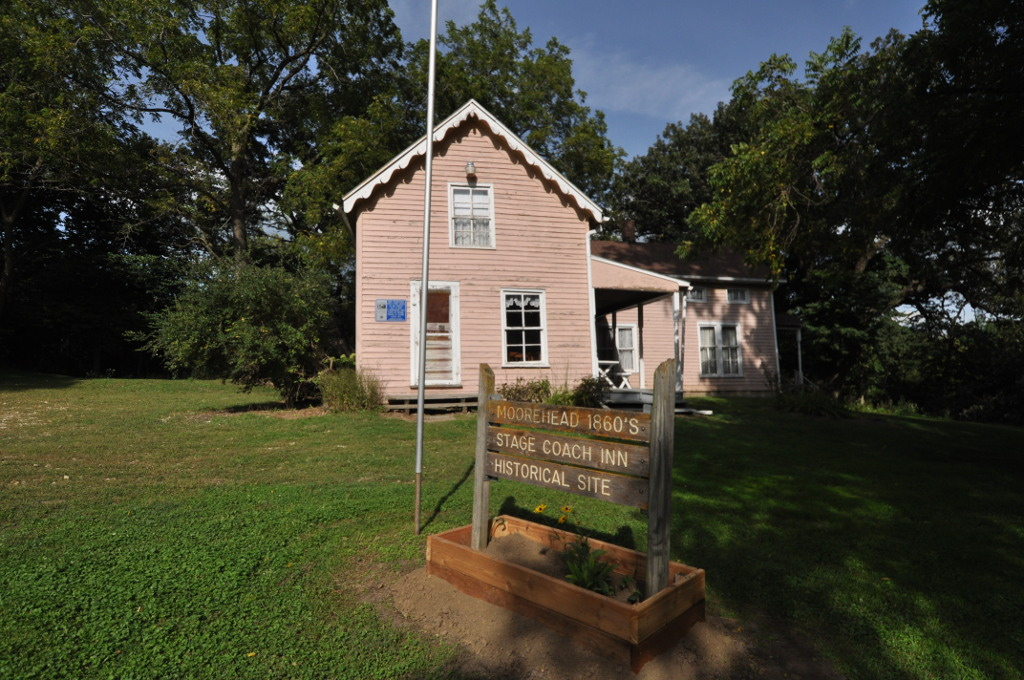

- Location within Iowa Location within the United States
- Location: Off U.S. Route 59 in Moorehead Pioneer Park; Ida Grove, Iowa
- Coordinates: 42°21′15″N 95°28′44″W
- Area: less than one acre
- Built: 1856-1863
- NRHP reference No.: 74000788
- Added to NRHP: August 27, 1974

The Moorehead Stagecoach Inn is a historic building located in Ida Grove, Iowa, United States. The Western Stage Line began to operate stagecoaches from Lizzard Point (Fort Dodge, Iowa) to Sergeant Bluff (Sioux City, Iowa) in 1855. The following year John H. Moorehead began building this inn. It was completed in 1863, and it was the first building constructed in Ida Grove. It is a 1½-story, L-shaped, frame structure with twelve rooms. The building served a variety of purposes in its early days. Two years after Ida County was organized it became the county courthouse and remained so until 1871. The building also housed the post office, as well as religious, educational, and commercial purposes.

The Moorehead Stagecoach Inn is now located in Moorehead Pioneer Park, which is under the direction of the Ida County Conservation Board. It is the only historic structure in the park that is on its original site and is open to the public on Sundays in the summer. It was listed on the National Register of Historic Places in 1974.
