= Storm Lake Times Pilot =

Iowa newspaper

The Storm Lake Times Pilot
- Buena Vista County's Hometown Newspaper
- Type: Semiweekly newspaper
- Format: Broadsheet
- Publisher: John Cullen
- Editor: Art Cullen
- Founded: June 29, 1990; 36 years ago
- Language: English
- Headquarters: 220 West Railroad Street; Storm Lake, Iowa
- Circulation: 2,369
- Website: stormlake.com

The Storm Lake Times Pilot (formerly the Storm Lake Times) is a twice-weekly newspaper based in Storm Lake, Iowa, covering Buena Vista County and parts of neighboring Clay, Pocahontas, Sac, Ida and Cherokee counties. The newspaper, founded in 1990, is staffed and published by the Cullen family. Editor Art Cullen received the 2017 Pulitzer Prize in Editorial Writing for a series of editorials on dark money in corporate agriculture in Iowa.

== History ==
John Cullen began publishing The Storm Lake Times as a weekly newspaper, on June 29, 1990. It was delivered on Fridays. In 1993, the Times moved to daily publication, then to twice weekly the following year. The Times became a direct competitor to The Storm Lake Pilot Tribune, which had been publishing in the town since 1870.

Times Editor Art Cullen received the 2017 Pulitzer Prize in Editorial Writing for a series of editorials on dark money in corporate agriculture in Iowa. Cullen's coverage of corporate funds being used by the local public utility to fight a federal lawsuit related to the release of nitrates into drinking water earned him national acclaim. The newspaper's coverage of ethnicity-related issues in Storm Lake, where 21 percent of residents are Latino, also earned praise from The Los Angeles Times.

=== National coverage ===
On October 20, 2007, The Times was mentioned by The New York Times and ABC's George Stephanopoulos for being the first newspaper to endorse a presidential candidate, Joe Biden, months ahead of the Iowa caucuses.

On May 7, 2008, The Times again received national attention for a story written by reporter Jake Kurtz about Dale Davis, a blind World War II veteran who bowled a perfect 300 game at Century Lanes in Alta, Iowa.

On November 3, 2009, Art Cullen testified before the Senate Health, Education, Labor and Pensions Committee on the impact of health care costs on small businesses in America. The appearance came at the request of a longtime friend, Senator Tom Harkin.

The newspaper is the subject of a 2021 PBS Independent Lens documentary film, Storm Lake.

== Layout and content ==
The Times is printed in broadsheet format. A complete online version is available by subscription. There is also a website. Each issue has three sections: Front/News, Sports, and Family & Friends.

An average issue of The Times includes 50 or more news and sports photographs, about one-third of them in color. The sports department covers eight high schools (Storm Lake, Storm Lake St. Mary's, Alta, Newell-Fonda, Schaller-Crestland, Sioux Central, Aurelia, Laurens-Marathon) and one college (Buena Vista University). Nearly 600 area cooks have been featured in the "My Favorite Recipes" weekly feature.

Additional special sections include:.

- The Green Saver — regional advertising guide that reaches 24,000 homes in western Iowa, Wednesdays
- TV Times — television listings, Saturdays
- FarmTimes — local farm coverage
- GoldenTimes — for senior citizens, odd-numbered months
- Health & Fitness — wellness and recreation, even-numbered months
- HomeTimes — home improvement, monthly March–October
- Prep Sports Previews — quarterly
