= Ida County Courthouse =

- U.S. National Register of Historic Places
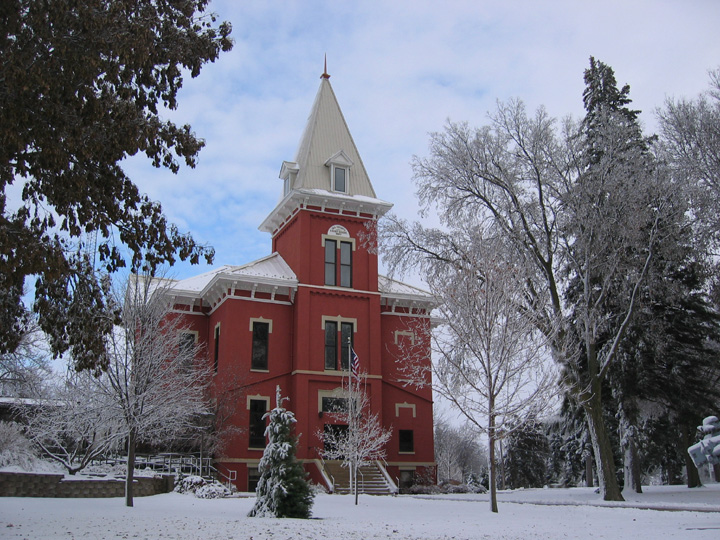

- Location within Iowa Location within the United States
- Location: 401 Moorehead St. Ida Grove, Iowa
- Coordinates: 42°20′31″N 95°28′2″W
- Area: about 2 acres (0.81 ha)
- Built: 1883
- Architectural style: Italianate
- MPS: County Courthouses in Iowa TR
- NRHP reference No.: 74000787
- Added to NRHP: March 15, 1974

The Ida County Courthouse, located in Ida Grove, Iowa, United States, was built in 1883. It was listed on the National Register of Historic Places in 1974 as a part of the County Courthouses in Iowa Thematic Resource. The courthouse is the second building the county has used for court functions and county administration.

== History ==
The first Ida County courthouse was the first building built in Ida Grove. It was destroyed in a fire along with the county records in 1877. The county rented office space in several small buildings until 1880 when it was consolidated in a single building. Construction on the present courthouse was begun that same year and completed in 1883. It was originally built by David Wood Townsend. Jail cells were originally located in the basement, and are now used for storage. The courthouse was remodeled twice in the 1930s to increase the office space. An administration annex was added in 1982. The building is located in a park-like setting in a residential neighborhood.

== Architecture ==
The historic portion of the courthouse was built in the Italianate style, and it follows an irregular plan. The building roughly measures 82 by 66 feet (25 by 20 m). The exterior is composed of brick and is two and one half stories tall. The tall slender windows are capped with simple ornamental stone hoods. The building's prominent feature is the 110-foot (34 m) tower. The high pitched hip roof that caps the building and that of the spire on the tower suggests the Gothic Revival style. Bracketed eaves encircle the building and the tower.
