= Galva, Iowa =

- City
- Location of Galva, Iowa
- Coordinates: 42°30′09″N 95°24′45″W
- Country: US
- State: Iowa
- County: Ida

Area
  - Total: 0.75 sq mi (1.95 km^{2})
  - Land: 0.75 sq mi (1.95 km^{2})
  - Water: 0 sq mi (0.00 km^{2})
- Elevation: 1,312 ft (400 m)

Population (2020)
  - Total: 435
  - Density: 577/sq mi (222.7/km^{2})
- Time zone: UTC-6 (Central (CST))
  - Summer (DST): UTC-5 (CDT)
- ZIP code: 51020
- Area code: 712
- FIPS code: 19-29595
- GNIS feature ID: 2394848
- Website: galvaiowa.com

Galva is a city in Ida County, Iowa, United States. The population was 435 at the time of the 2020 census.

== History ==
Galva was named after Galva, Illinois, the former hometown of a large share of its early settlers.

== Geography ==
According to the United States Census Bureau, the city has a total area of 0.71 square miles (1.84 km^{2}), all land.

== Demographics ==
Historical populations
Year	Pop.	±%
1900	456	—
1910	357	−21.7%
1920	539	+51.0%
1930	530	−1.7%
1940	496	−6.4%
1950	492	−0.8%
1960	469	−4.7%
1970	412	−12.2%
1980	420	+1.9%
1990	398	−5.2%
2000	368	−7.5%
2010	434	+17.9%
2020	435	+0.2%
Source:"U.S. Census website". United States Census Bureau. and Iowa Data Center; Source: U.S. Decennial Census

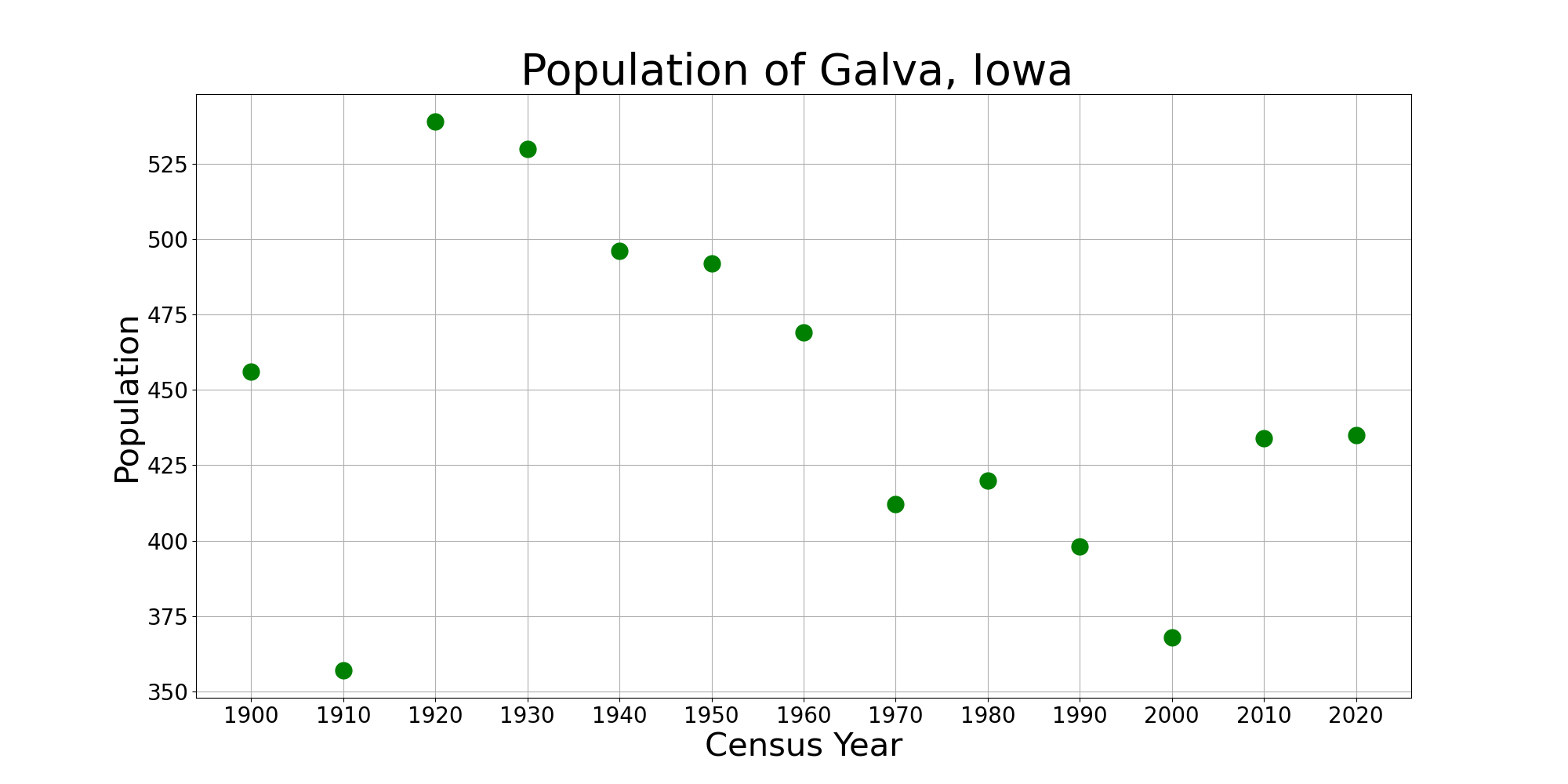
The population of Galva, Iowa from US census data

=== 2020 census ===
As of the census of 2020, there were 435 people, 158 households, and 107 families residing in the city. The population density was 576.8 inhabitants per square mile (222.7/km^{2}). There were 184 housing units at an average density of 244.0 per square mile (94.2/km^{2}). The racial makeup of the city was 86.9% White, 0.5% Black or African American, 0.2% Native American, 1.1% Asian, 0.0% Pacific Islander, 5.7% from other races and 5.5% from two or more races. Hispanic or Latino persons of any race comprised 12.2% of the population.

Of the 158 households, 36.1% of which had children under the age of 18 living with them, 53.8% were married couples living together, 5.1% were cohabitating couples, 20.9% had a female householder with no spouse or partner present and 20.3% had a male householder with no spouse or partner present. 32.3% of all households were non-families. 26.6% of all households were made up of individuals, 11.4% had someone living alone who was 65 years old or older.

The median age in the city was 33.9 years. 32.4% of the residents were under the age of 20; 4.1% were between the ages of 20 and 24; 29.0% were from 25 and 44; 22.5% were from 45 and 64; and 12.0% were 65 years of age or older. The gender makeup of the city was 50.6% male and 49.4% female.

=== 2010 census ===
As of the census of 2010, there were 434 people, 174 households, and 113 families residing in the city. The population density was 611.3 inhabitants per square mile (236.0/km^{2}). There were 189 housing units at an average density of 266.2 per square mile (102.8/km^{2}). The racial makeup of the city was 95.4% White, 0.2% African American, 0.7% Native American, 0.2% Asian, 3.2% from other races, and 0.2% from two or more races. Hispanic or Latino of any race were 6.5% of the population.

There were 174 households, of which 36.8% had children under the age of 18 living with them, 55.2% were married couples living together, 5.7% had a female householder with no husband present, 4.0% had a male householder with no wife present, and 35.1% were non-families. 31.0% of all households were made up of individuals, and 13.2% had someone living alone who was 65 years of age or older. The average household size was 2.49 and the average family size was 3.16.

The median age in the city was 34 years. 29.3% of residents were under the age of 18; 7.4% were between the ages of 18 and 24; 22.4% were from 25 to 44; 23.9% were from 45 to 64; and 17.1% were 65 years of age or older. The gender makeup of the city was 48.6% male and 51.4% female.

=== 2000 census ===
As of the census of 2000, there were 368 people, 164 households, and 115 families residing in the city. The population density was 573.2 inhabitants per square mile (221.3/km^{2}). There were 185 housing units at an average density of 288.2 per square mile (111.3/km^{2}). The racial makeup of the city was 99.18% White, 0.54% Asian, and 0.27% from two or more races.

There were 164 households, out of which 25.0% had children under the age of 18 living with them, 65.9% were married couples living together, 3.7% had a female householder with no husband present, and 29.3% were non-families. 27.4% of all households were made up of individuals, and 16.5% had someone living alone who was 65 years of age or older. The average household size was 2.24 and the average family size was 2.71.

In the city, the population was spread out, with 20.1% under the age of 18, 7.1% from 18 to 24, 21.5% from 25 to 44, 20.7% from 45 to 64, and 30.7% who were 65 years of age or older. The median age was 46 years. For every 100 females, there were 98.9 males. For every 100 females age 18 and over, there were 98.6 males.

The median income for a household in the city was $30,577, and the median income for a family was $33,438. Males had a median income of $26,250 versus $17,000 for females. The per capita income for the city was $24,062. About 5.4% of families and 6.6% of the population were below the poverty line, including 8.5% of those under age 18 and 1.8% of those age 65 or over.

== Education ==
Galva is served by the Galva–Holstein Community School District. It was established on July 1, 1980, by the merger of the merger of the Galva and Holstein school districts.

Circa 2010, Galva-Holstein began grade sharing with the Schaller-Crestland Community School District. This district cooperates with Schaller-Crestland, and the two have the collective name "Ridge View Community School District".
