= Alta Community School District =

Former school district in Iowa

Alta Community School District was a school district headquartered in Alta, Iowa. It was mostly in Buena Vista County, with a section in Cherokee County and a very small section in Sac County. It operated Alta Elementary School and Alta Junior-Senior High School.

In 1989, it began a whole grade-sharing arrangement, in which one district sends certain grade levels to another district's schools, with the Aurelia Community School District. However this agreement ended in 1996, and the Iowa Association of School Boards stated that the previous arrangement and its outcome resulted in "some community members [being] offended".

In 2010, Alta and Aurelia resumed sharing athletic teams. A new grade-sharing arrangement with Aurelia began in 2011. Both districts had their elementary schools, with Aurelia hosting the middle school and Alta hosting the high school. The shared Alta–Aurelia superintendent, Lynn Evans, stated that only secondary classes were grade-shared as they were more expensive to teach than primary classes.

In September 2017, an election on whether the districts should be merged was held. The merger was approved 257–8 in Alta and 178–55 in Aurelia. On July 1, 2018, the Alta district merged with the Aurelia district into the Alta–Aurelia Community School District.
