= Silver Creek Township, Ida County, Iowa =

Township in Iowa, USA

Coordinates: 42°26′N 95°23′W

Silver Creek Township is a township in Ida County, Iowa, United States. The 2020 US census reported the township having a population of 49 with the median age being 73.2.
