= Biggs Wehde =

American baseball player (1906–1970)

Wilbur "Biggs" Wehde
- Pitcher
- Born: November 23, 1906; Holstein, Iowa, U.S.
- Died: September 21, 1970 (aged 63); Sioux Falls, South Dakota, U.S.
- Batted: Right Threw: Right

MLB debut
- September 15, 1930, for the Chicago White Sox

Last MLB appearance
- August 3, 1931, for the Chicago White Sox

MLB statistics
- Win–loss record: 1–0
- Earned run average: 7.66
- Strikeouts: 6
- Stats at Baseball Reference

Teams
- Chicago White Sox (1930–1931)

Wilbur "Biggs" Wehde (November 23, 1906 – September 21, 1970) was an American Major League Baseball pitcher who played in 1930 and 1931 with the Chicago White Sox. He batted and threw right-handed.

== Biography ==
Wehde was born November 23, 1906, and grew up on an eleven-acre dairy farm on the edge of Holstein, Iowa, where is father operated a small creamery. He was the eldest of five children born to Gus and Frieda Suiter Wehde. His half brothers, twins Ray and Roy Wehde, the youngest of four children born to Gus and Anna Christopherson Wehde, were basketball players at Holstein High School and Iowa State University.

He played minor league baseball for the Sioux Falls Canaries just prior to his military service. He previously played for both the Sioux City Cowboys and the Dubuque Tigers in the Mississippi Valley League before joining the White Sox on September 15, 1930, at the age of 23. Wehde would go on to make twelve appearances for Chicago, all in relief, during 1930 and 1931.

Biggs served as a specialist 3 in the U.S. Navy during World War II.

He died on September 21, 1970, at the age of 63, in Sioux Falls, South Dakota, and is buried in Calvary Cemetery, Sioux City, Iowa.
