= Lauren K. Soth =

American journalist

Lauren Kephart Soth (October 2, 1910 – February 9, 1998) was an American journalist and recipient of the 1956 Pulitzer Prize for Editorial Writing.

== Biography ==
Soth was born October 2, 1910, in Sibley, Iowa, United States, he is the son of a school superintendent Michael Ray Soth and Virginia Mabel (Kephart) Soth. He grew up in a few different small towns in Iowa including, Alton, Marathon, Wyoming, and Holstein. He attended Holstein High School. Soth attended Iowa State University (ISU) in 1927 and earned a B.S. in agricultural journalism in 1932 and a M.S. in agricultural economics in 1938.

Soth was hired to write editorials in 1947 for The Des Moines Register and Des Moines Tribune. He was then promoted to assistant editor in 1951 and later promoted to editor in 1954 for the editorial pages, working between 1947 until 1975 for 28 years.

In 1955 Soth wrote "If the Russians Want More Meat...", an editorial article inviting a Soviet delegation to visit Iowa and learn about farming during the Cold War-era. As a result, an educational travel exchange between Soviet and Iowa farmers occurred, and it was this article that won him the 1956 Pulitzer Prize for Editorial Writing.

He died on February 9, 1998, of cancer at Iowa Methodist Hospital in Des Moines, Iowa.
