= David Wood Townsend =

American developer

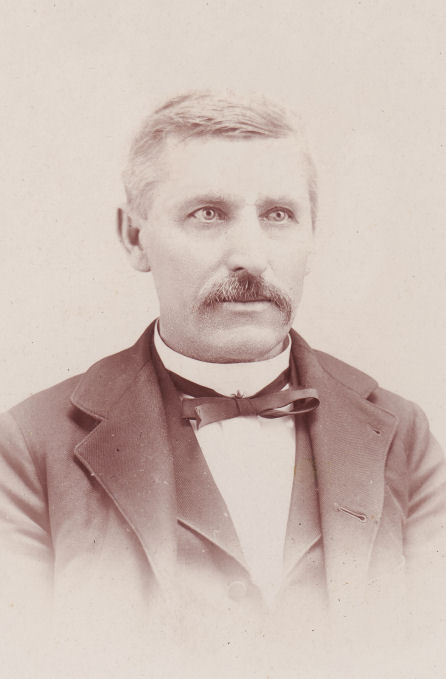
- Born: July 18, 1844; Mount Gilead, Ohio, United States
- Died: March 8, 1912 (aged 67); Wichita, Kansas
- Occupation(s): Businessman, builder
- Known for: Building several buildings that are listed on the National Register of Historic Places listings in Iowa
- Spouse: Mary Ellen Brown (m. 1868) Sarah Maggie (Ellis) Cooper (m. 1882) Mary Ann Bunford (m. 1906)
- Children: 10

David Wood Townsend (July 18, 1844 – March 8, 1912) was an American business owner and builder in Western Iowa.

Starting out representing Knapp, Stout & Co. Lumber, he later owned and operated several Townsend Bros. Lumber Yards both in Iowa and Nebraska. He also owned several general mercantile stores in Iowa.

Some of the buildings he built are listed in the National Register of Historic Places listings in Iowa.

== Early life ==
David Wood Townsend was born at Mount Gilead, Ohio, July 18, 1844, to Eli and Abigail Mosher (Wood) Townsend. Abigail was the sister of Samuel Newitt Wood and Stephen Mosher Wood. His parents and grandparents were involved in the Underground Railroad in Ohio.

== Career ==
In 1882, he oversaw the building of the Plymouth County Bank building. In 1884, Townsend and J. M. Starbuck contracted to build the Ida County Courthouse. In 1884, Townsend was contracted to build the school house at Cherokee, Iowa.

In 1886, Townsend contracted and oversaw the building of the Marshall County Courthouse (Iowa) and the court house at Council Bluffs and built a hotel at Sioux City. That same year he also added another story to the Sioux City Journal building in Sioux City. In 1898, he contracted with Cutting & Willett and K of P Lodge at Oto, Woodbury county, Iowa to build a two story brick building with the lodge taking the top floor.

He also owned several general mercantile stores including one at Melrose, Iowa and another one at Granville, Iowa. He also owned and operated a mercantile establishment at Edgerton, Minnesota.

In the 1890s, Townsend owned the ACME Real Estate and Exchange Co., of Cherokee, Iowa.

He also managed the Cherokee Brick and Tile Works in the 1890s after his partner John M. Starbuck left for the Klondike Gold Rush. They supplied over 10,000,000 bricks for the Cherokee Mental Health Institute Insane Asylum.

== Personal life ==
Townsend married Mary Ellen Brown on April 14, 1868 and they were the parents of Glenn Eli Townsend, Clara Ellen Townsend, Charles Willis Townsend, Perry Townsend, Archie Townsend, Royal Wood Townsend, Mary Edna (Townsend) Adsit, and Elma Townsend. Townsend married Sarah Maggie (Ellis) Cooper on February 14, 1882 and they were the parents of Helene (Townsend) Smith and David Waldo Townsend. Townsend married Mary Ann Bunford in 1906.

He died in Wichita, Kansas on March 8, 1912.

Townsend's grandson David W. Townsend was an Art Director for Metro-Goldwyn-Mayer Studios in the 1930s.
