= Waveland Round Barn =

- U.S. National Register of Historic Places
- Location within Iowa Location within the United States
- Location: Off U.S. Route 20
- Nearest city: Cushing, Iowa
- Coordinates: 42°29′46″N 95°42′9″W
- Area: less than one acre
- Built: 1900
- MPS: Iowa Round Barns: The Sixty Year Experiment TR
- NRHP reference No.: 86001438
- Added to NRHP: June 30, 1986

The Waveland Round Barn was a historic building located near Cushing in rural Ida County, Iowa, United States. Built in 1900, the barn measured 50 feet (15 m) in diameter. It featured red vertical siding, a large central section with a conical roof, a wing section that surrounded the central section with a sectional roof and a hay dormer above the main entrance on the east side. The three-story central section makes this an unusual round barn in Iowa. It was listed on the National Register of Historic Places in 1986. The barn was bulldozed and the remains were burnt in March 2012.
