= Blaine Township, Ida County, Iowa =

Township in Iowa, USA

Coordinates: 42°20′N 95°23′W

Blaine Township is a township in Ida County, Iowa, United States.
