= St. Mary's High School (Storm Lake, Iowa) =

Private secondary school in Storm Lake, Iowa, United States

Location
- 312 Seneca Street; Storm Lake, (Buena Vista County), Iowa 50588-2554; United States
- 42°38′23″N 95°11′51″W

Information
- Type: Private, Coeducational
- Religious affiliation: Roman Catholic
- Established: 1912
- President: Father Brent Lingle
- Administrator: Ryan Berg
- Principal: Ryan Berg
- Grades: PRE–12
- Colors: Black and White
- Athletics conference: Twin Lakes Conference
- Team name: Panthers
- Athletic Director: Steve Ryan
- Website: School Website

St. Mary's High School is a private, Catholic high school in Storm Lake, Iowa. It is located in the Diocese of Sioux City.

== Background ==
Located three blocks from the waterfront of Storm Lake, the school offers a quality, faith-based education. The school opened in 1912 as an elementary school, and it was expanded to house Pre-K through 12th Grade in August 1967.

== Athletics ==
The Panthers compete in the Twin Lakes Conference in the following sports:

- Cross Country
- Volleyball
- Basketball
  - Boys' 2011 Class 1A State Champions
  - Boys' 2012 Class 1A State Consolation Champions
  - Boys' 2013 Class 1A State Runners-Up
- Track and Field
- Golf
- Baseball
  - 1993 Class 1A State Champions
  - 1997 Class 1A State Semi Finalists
  - 2002 Class 1A State Semi Finalists
- Softball

The Panthers also combine their sports and compete with Storm Lake Public High School for Wrestling, Cross-Country, and Football baseball at the high school level. Storm Lake High School competes in the 3A division of Iowa Athletics.

== See also ==
- List of high schools in Iowa
