= Battle Township, Ida County, Iowa =

Township in Iowa, USA

Coordinates: 42.4282°N 95.6112°W

Battle Township is a township in Ida County, Iowa, United States.
