= Aurelia Community School District =

Former school district in Iowa

Aurelia Community School District was a school district headquartered in Aurelia, Iowa. It was mostly in Cherokee County, with a section in Buena Vista County.

In 1989, it began a whole grade-sharing arrangement, in which one district sends certain grade levels to another district's schools, with the Alta Community School District. However this agreement ended in 1996, and the Iowa Association of School Boards stated that the previous arrangement and its outcome resulted in "some community members [being] offended".

In 2010, Aurelia and Alta resumed sharing athletic teams. A new grade-sharing arrangement with Alta began in 2011. Both districts had their elementary schools, with Aurelia hosting the middle school and Alta hosting the high school. The shared Alta–Aurelia superintendent, Lynn Evans, stated that only secondary classes were grade-shared as they were more expensive to teach than primary classes.

In September 2017, an election on whether the districts should be merged was held. The merger was approved 178–55 in Aurelia and 257–8 in Alta. On July 1, 2018, the Aurelia district merged with the Alta district into the Alta–Aurelia Community School District.
