= Galva Township, Ida County, Iowa =

Township in Iowa, USA

Coordinates: 42°31′N 95°27′W

Galva Township is a township in Ida County, Iowa, United States.
