= Alta High School (Iowa) =

Coordinates: 42.6699°N 95.3045°W

Alta Senior High School
- 101 West 5th St. Alta, Iowa; United States

Information
- Type: Public
- School district: Alta Community School District
- Staff: 15.96 (FTE)
- Enrollment: 211 (2018–19)
- Student to teacher ratio: 13.22
- Colors: Navy Blue, Red, and White
- Athletics conference: Twin Lakes
- Mascot: Warrior

Alta High School, also known as Alta Junior-Senior High School, was the senior high school of the Alta Community School District. It is located in the city of Alta, Iowa in Buena Vista County, Iowa, United States.

Alta-Aurelia High School is now the community's high school.

== Education ==
Alta High School had a 10:1 teacher to student ratio. Alta's graduation rate is 93.3% and 74% of the 2004-2005 ACT participating Seniors scoring 20 or higher on the ACT. Higher level college courses can be taken from Iowa Central Community College and at Buena Vista University. Alta has a National Honor Society program as well as a Junior Engineering Technical Society (JETS) program. There were many theatrical opportunities at Alta, including Speech, Fall Musical, and a Spring Play performed at the school-owned and operated theater.

== School activities ==
=== Alta Speech Program ===
There was a Speech program at Alta. Alta High School participants have been selected for the IHSSA All-State Speech festival for both Large Group and Individual in the past years.

=== Athletics ===
Alta's sport programs were: Football, Volleyball, Cross Country, Cheerleading/Danceline, Swimming, Basketball, Wrestling, Track & Field, Golf, Baseball, and Softball. Some of the accomplishment's include:

Football: 2006, 2007, 2008 and 2009 State Playoff Qualifier

Cross Country: 2004 State Team Participant, 2005 and 2006 State Qualifiers, 2011 State Qualifiers (8th place)

Volleyball: 2006 NW Conference Champions

Basketball :State Runner-up 1971, 1972 State Champions, 1975 State Participants, 2006 State Participants, and more recently, in the 2006-2007 season Alta went undefeated in regular season play, only to fall at the hands of long time rival Aurelia in tournament play. One of the only teams to ever lose to Aurelia in any sport.

Track: 2006 & 2007 Conference Champions. Alta girls' track has had success with the 2004, 2005 400m and 2005 400m hurdles 1A State Champion.

Golf: 2005 NW Conference Champions

=== Music ===
Alta had a music program. The strengths have been jazz band, marching band, and numerous Division I ranked choirs and concert bands.

== Miscellaneous information ==
- The Alta High School building had been operating since 1916.
- Until the 2003-2004 school year, the 7th and 8th grades were also located at the high school. The 2003-2004 school year marked the opening of Alta Middle School.
