= Galva–Holstein Community School District =

Public school district in Holstein, Iowa, United States

Coordinates: 42.487401°N 95.537242°W

Galva–Holstein School District

Address
- 519 East Maple Street Holstein Ida County Iowa, 51025; United States
- Coordinates: 42.487401, -95.537242

District information
- Established: 1980
- Superintendent: Adam Bisenius
- Schools: 3
- Budget: $9,052,000 (2020-21)
- NCES District ID: 1912230

Students and staff
- Students: 484 (2022-23)
- Teachers: 37.06 FTE
- Staff: 46.74 FTE
- Student–teacher ratio: 13.06
- Athletic conference: Western Valley
- District mascot: Raptors
- Colors: Orange, Gold and Black

Other information
- Website: rvraptors.org

The Galva–Holstein School District is a rural public school district in Ida County, Iowa, United States, based in Holstein, Iowa.

The district, which serves Holstein and Galva, is mostly in Ida County, with sections in Buena Vista, Cherokee, and Sac counties.

As the district shares a superintendent and some schools with the Schaller-Crestland Community School District, the two operate under the name "Ridge View Community School District".

== History ==
It was established on July 1, 1980, by the merger of the Galva and Holstein school districts. Galva was previously known as the Galva Blue Devils. Holstein held the title of Pirates. Once Galva and Holstein merged, they were then known as the Galva–Holstein Pirates.

Beginning circa 2010, it engaged in a grade-sharing agreement with the Schaller-Crestland Community School District, and also shared superintendents with that district.

Before grade-sharing began, Galva–Holstein had numerous sports sharing agreements with surrounding schools. This included Schaller-Crestland (wrestling and football primarily) and Aurelia Community School (exclusively wrestling). During this time the teams were known by several different names including: Buffalo Ridge Bison (football sharing with Schaller-Crestland) and the AGHSC (Aurelia, Galva–Holstein, Schaller-Crestland) Stonecutters (wrestling with Aurelia and Schaller-Crestland).

Galva–Holstein has had fierce rivalry with neighboring school district, Battle Creek–Ida Grove (Currently known as OABCIG with the merger of Odeboldt Arthur). Though this rival has toned down some, it is still a part of history within the school and is often discussed during alumni reunions.

Ridge View has found a new rival within their sports conferences. MVAOCOU (Maple Valley, Anthon–Oto, Charter Oak–Ute) has become a popular rival within the district.

In recent years, Ridge View began sports sharing with River Valley community school district. Sports currently being shared are Wrestling.

== Schools ==
As of 2024 it operates one elementary school, Galva-Holstein Elementary School, along with Ridge View High School in Holstein.

As of 2018, it operated two elementary schools, Holstein Elementary School (PreK–2nd grade) and Galva Elementary School (grades 3–5), as well as Ridge View High School in Holstein. The district grade-shares with Ridge View Middle School in Early, operated by Schaller-Crestland.

The Galva–Holstein School District previously had one elementary school, one middle school, and one high school.

- Galva–Holstein Elementary School
- Galva–Holstein Middle School
- Ridge View High School

Previously its high school was Galva–Holstein High School.

=== Ridge View High School ===
==== Athletics ====
The Raptors compete in the Western Valley Activities Conference in the following sports:

- Cross country
- Volleyball
- Football
- Basketball
- Track and field
- Golf
- Baseball
- Softball

Students can also participate in Tennis with Cherokee High School.

== See also ==
- List of school districts in Iowa
- List of high schools in Iowa
