= Schaller, Iowa =

- City
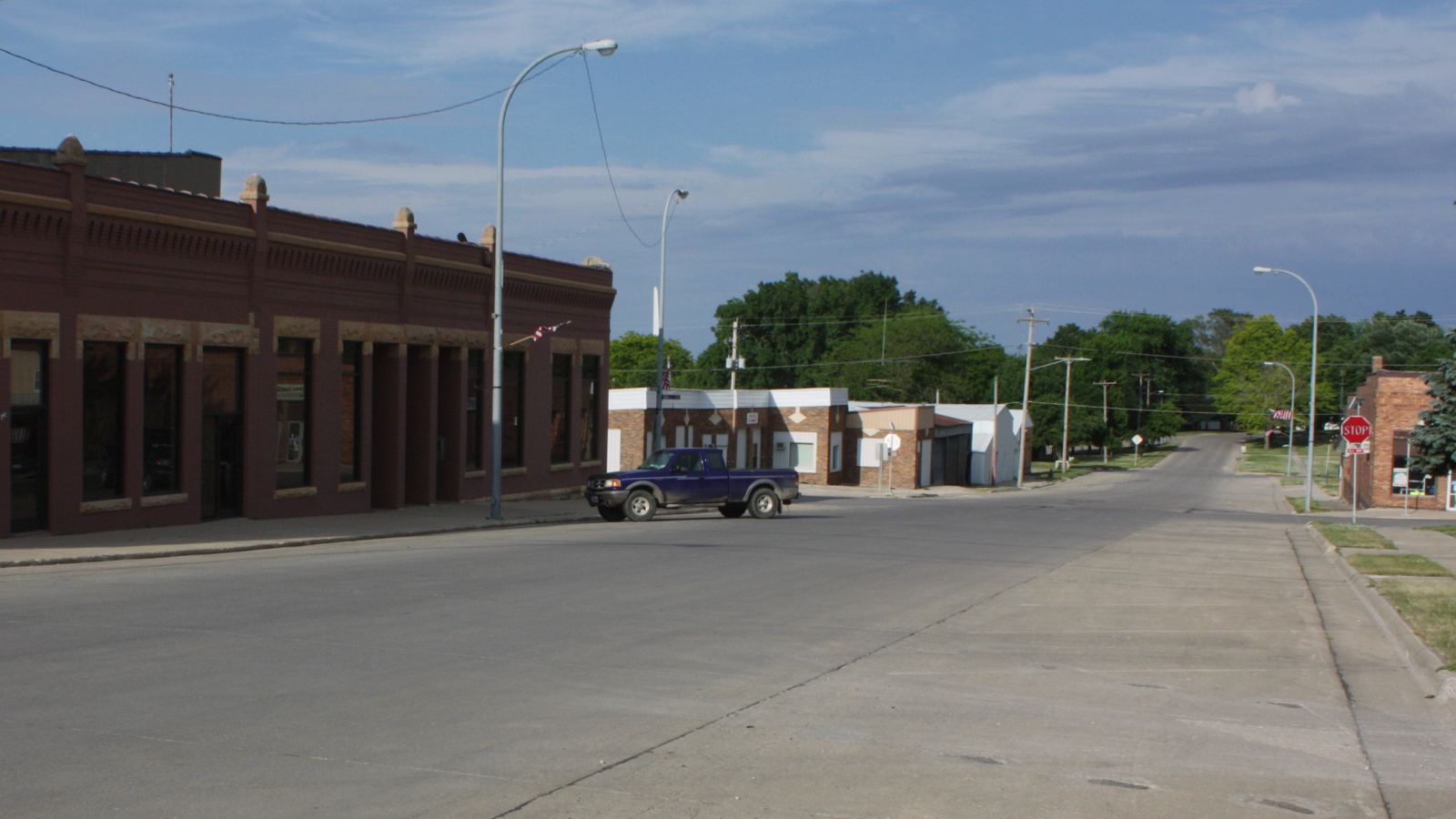
- Eastward view along 2nd St.

- Location of Schaller, Iowa

- Location within Iowa Location within the United States
- Coordinates: 42°30′02″N 95°17′47″W
- Country: United States
- State: Iowa
- County: Sac
- Township: Eureka

Area
  - Total: 1.26 sq mi (3.26 km^{2})
  - Land: 1.26 sq mi (3.26 km^{2})
  - Water: 0 sq mi (0.00 km^{2})
- Elevation: 1,427 ft (435 m)

Population (2020)
  - Total: 729
  - Density: 579.1/sq mi (223.59/km^{2})
- Time zone: UTC-6 (Central (CST))
  - Summer (DST): UTC-5 (CDT)
- ZIP code: 51053
- Area code: 712
- FIPS code: 19-71085
- GNIS feature ID: 2396552
- Website: cityofschaller.weebly.com

Schaller is a city in Sac County, Iowa, United States. The population was 729 at the time of the 2020 census.

== History ==
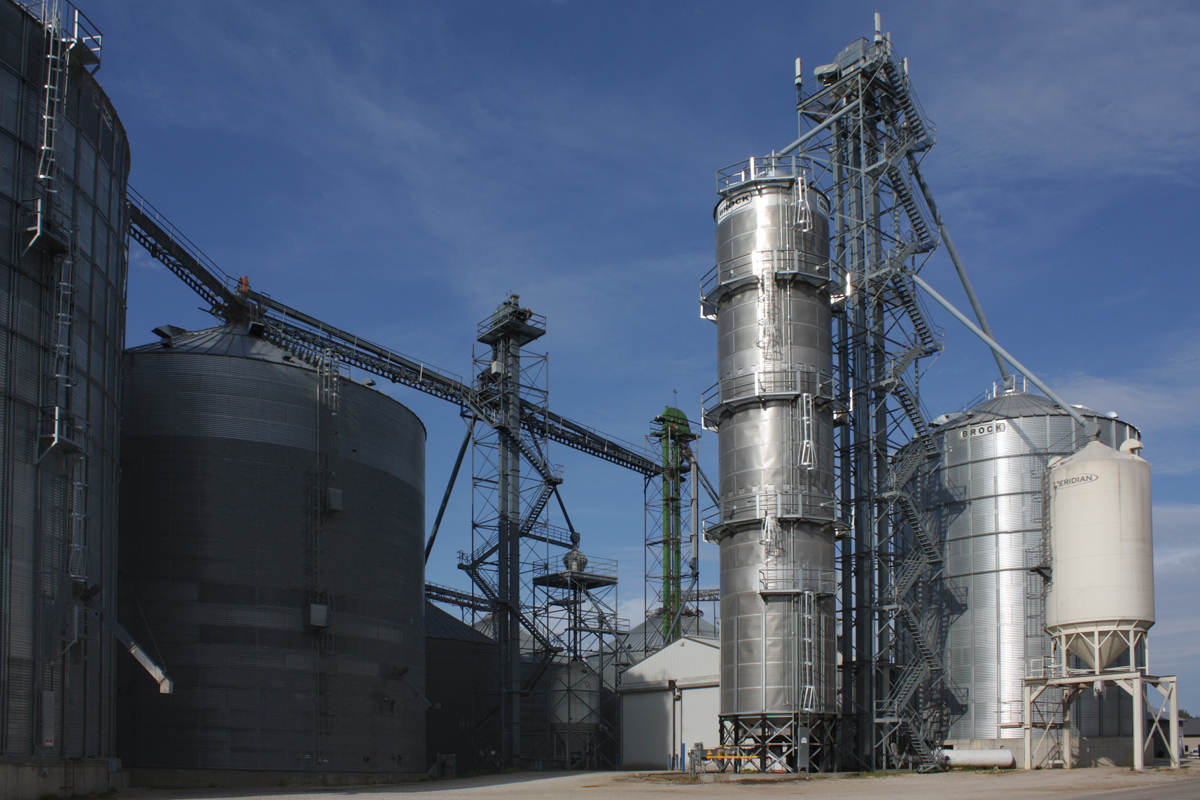
Grain elevators along W 1st St.

The city of Schaller, named after Phillip Schaller, was incorporated in 1882. The city had been founded in August 1879 as a station for the railroad under construction. The economy, then as now, was based on commercial support for surrounding farms. Settlers came mostly from Germany, England, Canada, New York, and eastern Iowa. Throughout the middle part of the twentieth century a major industry consisted of the packers of Bango and Jolly Time popcorn. The presence and size of these two companies helped Schaller become "The Popcorn Capital of the world." Popcorn is still a major area industry, but the companies moved on to other locations in the 1980s. The railroad ceased operations and pulled up tracks in the 1970s. Transportation connections are by U.S. Route 20 and Iowa Highway 110. Corn (seed and feed), soybeans, and feeder cattle are the major products of the area.

== Geography ==
According to the United States Census Bureau, the city has a total area of 1.26 square miles (3.26 km^{2}), all land.

== Demographics ==
Historical populations
Year	Pop.	±%
1890	333	—
1900	661	+98.5%
1910	646	−2.3%
1920	731	+13.2%
1930	724	−1.0%
1940	758	+4.7%
1950	841	+10.9%
1960	896	+6.5%
1970	835	−6.8%
1980	832	−0.4%
1990	768	−7.7%
2000	779	+1.4%
2010	772	−0.9%
2020	729	−5.6%
Source:"U.S. Census website". United States Census Bureau. and Iowa Data Center; Source: U.S. Decennial Census

=== 2020 census ===
As of the census of 2020, there were 729 people, 297 households, and 186 families residing in the city. The population density was 579.1 inhabitants per square mile (223.6/km^{2}). There were 325 housing units at an average density of 258.2 per square mile (99.7/km^{2}). The racial makeup of the city was 79.4% White, 0.5% Black or African American, 0.0% Native American, 1.8% Asian, 0.4% Pacific Islander, 11.8% from other races and 6.0% from two or more races. Hispanic or Latino persons of any race comprised 21.0% of the population.

Of the 297 households, 31.0% of which had children under the age of 18 living with them, 45.8% were married couples living together, 6.7% were cohabitating couples, 27.3% had a female householder with no spouse or partner present and 20.2% had a male householder with no spouse or partner present. 37.4% of all households were non-families. 32.7% of all households were made up of individuals, 13.8% had someone living alone who was 65 years old or older.

The median age in the city was 38.0 years. 28.0% of the residents were under the age of 20; 6.0% were between the ages of 20 and 24; 23.6% were from 25 and 44; 24.8% were from 45 and 64; and 17.6% were 65 years of age or older. The gender makeup of the city was 50.5% male and 49.5% female.

=== 2010 census ===
As of the census of 2010, there were 772 people, 318 households, and 208 families living in the city. The population density was 612.7 inhabitants per square mile (236.6/km^{2}). There were 341 housing units at an average density of 270.6 per square mile (104.5/km^{2}). The racial makeup of the city was 93.5% White, 0.1% African American, 0.1% Native American, 0.3% Asian, 0.1% Pacific Islander, 3.0% from other races, and 2.8% from two or more races. Hispanic or Latino of any race were 9.6% of the population.

There were 318 households, of which 31.4% had children under the age of 18 living with them, 51.3% were married couples living together, 9.1% had a female householder with no husband present, 5.0% had a male householder with no wife present, and 34.6% were non-families. 29.6% of all households were made up of individuals, and 12% had someone living alone who was 65 years of age or older. The average household size was 2.43 and the average family size was 3.04.

The median age in the city was 38.8 years. 27.2% of residents were under the age of 18; 7.1% were between the ages of 18 and 24; 24% were from 25 to 44; 24.8% were from 45 to 64; and 16.8% were 65 years of age or older. The gender makeup of the city was 49.2% male and 50.8% female.

=== 2000 census ===
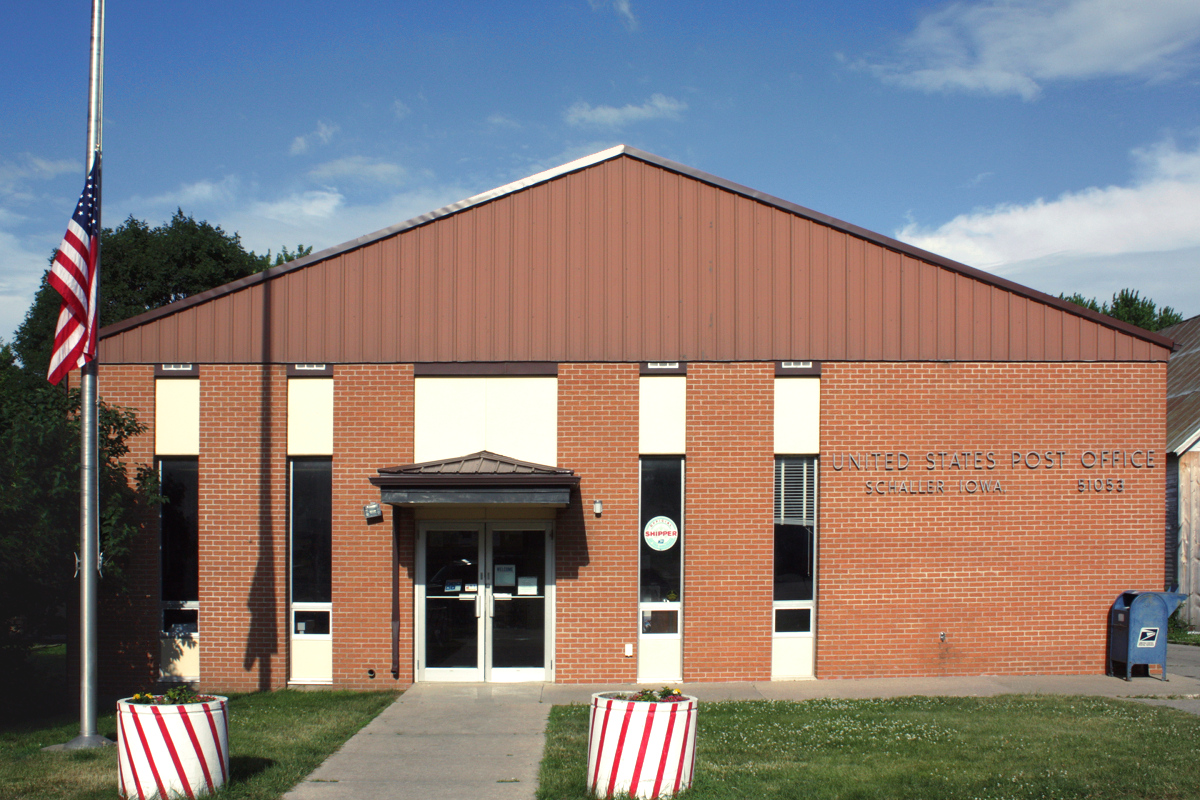
Post office on S Main St.

As of the census of 2000, there were 779 people, 321 households, and 216 families living in the city. The population density was 619.4 inhabitants per square mile (239.2/km^{2}). There were 347 housing units at an average density of 275.9 per square mile (106.5/km^{2}). The racial makeup of the city was 97.82% White, 0.13% African American, 0.26% Native American, 0.26% Asian, 0.13% Pacific Islander, 0.64% from other races, and 0.77% from two or more races. Hispanic or Latino of any race were 3.08% of the population.

There were 321 households, out of which 30.2% had children under the age of 18 living with them, 54.8% were married couples living together, 9.3% had a female householder with no husband present, and 32.4% were non-families. 28.7% of all households were made up of individuals, and 14.0% had someone living alone who was 65 years of age or older. The average household size was 2.43 and the average family size was 2.97.

Age spread: 27.1% under the age of 18, 9.1% from 18 to 24, 23.6% from 25 to 44, 20.4% from 45 to 64, and 19.8% who were 65 years of age or older. The median age was 38 years. For every 100 females, there were 100.3 males. For every 100 females age 18 and over, there were 93.9 males.

The median income for a household in the city was $33,365, and the median income for a family was $40,268. Males had a median income of $26,964 versus $17,875 for females. The per capita income for the city was $15,520. About 2.6% of families and 5.0% of the population were below the poverty line, including 3.2% of those under age 18 and 5.1% of those age 65 or over.

== Education ==
It is a part of the Schaller-Crestland Community School District. The district formed on July 1, 1993, by the merger of the Schaller Community School District and the Crestland Community School District.

This district cooperates with the Galva-Holstein Community School District, and the two have the collective name "Ridge View Community School District".
