= Twin Lakes Conference =

Iowa High School athletic conference

- Conference: IHSAA / IGHSAU
- Founded: 1932
- Sports fielded: 13
- No. of teams: 12
- Region: Northwest Iowa
- Official website: https://www.twinlakesconference.org/

The Twin Lakes Conference is an athletic conference in Iowa, made up of 2A and 1A schools, the two smallest classes of schools in Iowa.

== Members ==
Institution	Location	Mascot	Colors	Affiliation	2026-2027 BEDS
Alta–Aurelia	Alta	Warriors		Public	172
East Sac County	Lake View	Raiders		Public	170
Emmetsburg	Emmetsburg	E-Hawks		Public	184
Graettinger–Terril	Graettinger	Knights		Public	68
Manson–Northwest Webster	Manson	Cougars		Public	169
Newell-Fonda	Newell	Mustangs		Public	130
Pocahontas Area	Pocahontas	Indians		Public	181
Ruthven-Ayrshire	Ruthven	Raiders		Public	28
Sioux Central	Sioux Rapids	Rebels		Public	165
South Central Calhoun	Lake City	Titans		Public	197
Southeast Valley	Gowrie	Jaguars		Public	227
St. Mary Catholic	Storm Lake	Panthers		Private	35
West Bend–Mallard	West Bend	Wolverines		Public	95

=== Common cooperatives ===
Name	Schools participating	Mascot	Colors	Sports shared
GTRA	Graettinger-Terill, Ruthven-Ayrshire	Titans		Baseball, basketball, football, golf, softball, track and field, volleyball, wrestling

== History ==
The Twin Lakes conference was founded in 1932. The league's original members were the following:

- Lake City, Rockwell City, Pocahontas, Rolfe, Manson, and Lohrville

By the early 1960's the lineup was:

- Laurens
- Pocahontas
- Rolfe
- Gilmore City-Bradgate
- Twin Rivers of Bode
- Rockwell City
- Manson
- Albert City-Truesdale

Over time, all of the members merged with other nearby schools. The league also added Sac City, as smaller schools like Twin Rivers and Gilmore City-Bradgate left the conference. Albert City-Truesdale left the conference in the mid-80s, and the league added Prairie of Gowrie (later merged with Cedar Valley to become Prairie Valley) and Lake City (which later merged with Lohrville and became Southern Cal). In the early 90s, Rockwell City merged with Lytton. In 1991, the league added Alta–Aurelia and WLVA. In 1996, Alta–Aurelia and Sac City left the conference to help found the Northwest Conference.

In 2004, Southeast Webster-Grand was added to the conference from the recently disbanded North Star Conference. Laurens-Marathon left in 2007 for the Northwest Conference, the same year WLVA and Sac City merged to become East Sac County High School. In 2010, RC-L and Southern Cal began sharing all sports, after previously sharing baseball. Sioux Central, formerly of the Northwest Conference, became the first school from the Northwest to actively seek membership into the conference in the summer of 2009. The Northwest had seen many of their schools join with others schools and were bound to see more mergers in the near future.

After years of talk, in February 2011, the Twin Lakes agreed to merge with the Northwest Conference effective the 2011–12 school year. The new league maintained the Twin Lakes moniker. Alta–Aurelia, Newell-Fonda, Laurens-Marathon, Sioux Central and Storm Lake St. Mary's joined the conference, which split into two divisions, one maintaining the traditional Northwest conference schools and the other keeping the 6 current Twin Lakes members.

In 2014–15, the expanded again. GTRA and West Bend–Mallard became members of the league, leaving their homes in the now-defunct Cornbelt Conference. Prairie Valley and Southeast Webster-Grand agreed to a joint operation as Southeast Valley.
