= Alta–Aurelia Community School District =

Public school district in Alta, Iowa, United States

Coordinates: 42.670502°N 95.304811°W

Location
- Alta, Iowa Buena Vista, Cherokee, and Sac counties United States
- Coordinates: 42.670502, -95.304811

District information
- Type: Local school district
- Grades: K–12
- Established: 2018
- Superintendent: Denny Olhausen
- Schools: 4
- Budget: $12,618,000 (2020-21)
- NCES District ID: 1903480

Students and staff
- Students: 837 (2022-23)
- Teachers: 66.30 FTE
- Staff: 68.35 FTE
- Student–teacher ratio: 12.62
- Athletic conference: Twin Lakes
- District mascot: Warriors
- Colors: Navy and Red

Other information
- Website: www.alta-aurelia.org

Alta–Aurelia Community School District is a rural public school district with offices in Alta and Aurelia in Iowa.

The district, which serves Alta and Aurelia, covers sections of Buena Vista and Cherokee counties, with a very small section in Sac County.

It was created on July 1, 2018, as the merger of the Alta Community School District and the Aurelia Community School District, though they had previously shared high school sports. The merger was approved 178–55 in Aurelia and 257–8 in Alta during a September 2017 election.

== Schools ==
- Alta–Aurelia High School - Alta
- Alta–Aurelia Middle School - Aurelia
- Alta Elementary School
- Aurelia Elementary School

=== Alta–Aurelia High School ===
==== Athletics ====
The Warriors compete in the Twin Lakes Conference in the following sports:

- Cross country
- Volleyball
- Football
- Basketball
- Wrestling
- Track and field
- Golf
  - Boys' 1990 Class 3A State Champions
  - Girls' 3-time Class 2A State Champions (2013, 2015, 2016)
- Baseball
- Softball

== See also ==
- List of school districts in Iowa
- List of high schools in Iowa
