= Schaller-Crestland Community School District =

School district in Iowa, United States

Coordinates: 42.497906°N 95.297186°W

Location
- Schaller, Iowa Sac, Buena Vista, and Ida counties 51025; United States
- Coordinates: 42.497906, -95.297186

District information
- Established: 1993
- Superintendent: Jon Wiebers
- Schools: 2
- Budget: $7,463,000 (2020-21)
- NCES District ID: 1925380

Students and staff
- Students: 353 (2022-23)
- Teachers: 26.59 FTE
- Staff: 35.73 FTE
- Student–teacher ratio: 13.28
- Athletic conference: Western Valley
- District mascot: Raptors
- Colors: Orange, gold and black

Other information
- Website: rvraptors.org

Schaller-Crestland Community School District is a rural public school district headquartered in Schaller, Iowa.

It is mostly within Sac County, with portions in Buena Vista and Ida counties. It serves the municipalities of Schaller, Early, and Nemaha.

As the district shares a superintendent and some schools with the Galva–Holstein Community School District, the two operate under the name "Ridge View Community School District".

== History ==
The district formed on July 1, 1993, by the merger of the Schaller Community School District and the Crestland Community School District.

Beiginning circa 1958, Crestland was the consolidated school districts of Early and Nemaha, Iowa respectively. They were known as the Cadets. Schaller was an independent school district until 1993. They were known as the Rockets.

As Schaller-Crestland, they were known as the Wildcats. During their time as Schaller-Crestland, some of their major sports rivals included Newell-Fonda, Sac City, and Galva–Holstein.

Beginning circa 2010, it engaged in a grade-sharing agreement with the Galva–Holstein Community School District, and also shared superintendents with that district. They are now known as the Ridge View Raptors.

Before grade sharing with Galva–Holstein, the district participated in sharing of sports programs with several neighboring districts including Aurelia Community School District and Galva–Holstein. During this time, they were known as the Buffalo Ridge Bison (sharing with Galva–Holstein), and the Stonecutters (exclusively in wrestling with Aurelia and Galva–Holstein, known as AGHSC).

== Schools ==
As of 2018, it operates Schaller Elementary School in Schaller and Ridge View Middle School in Early, while it grade-shares with Ridge View High School.

Previously it operated Schaller-Crestland Elementary and Middle School, and Schaller-Crestland High School in Early.
