= Alta, Iowa =

- City
- Motto: "Catch the energy"
- Location of Alta, Iowa
- Coordinates: 42°40′18″N 95°18′16″W
- Country: USA
- State: Iowa
- County: Buena Vista

Area
  - Total: 1.08 sq mi (2.79 km^{2})
  - Land: 1.08 sq mi (2.79 km^{2})
  - Water: 0 sq mi (0.00 km^{2})
- Elevation: 1,516 ft (462 m)

Population (2020)
  - Total: 2,087
  - Density: 1,935/sq mi (747.3/km^{2})
- Time zone: UTC-6 (Central (CST))
  - Summer (DST): UTC-5 (CDT)
- ZIP code: 51002
- Area code: 712
- FIPS code: 19-01495
- GNIS feature ID: 2393929

Alta is a city in Buena Vista County, Iowa, United States. The population was 2,087 at the 2020 census.

== History ==
Alta was platted in 1872, and it was incorporated in 1878. By 1882, Alta contained three general stores, two drug stores, two grocery stores, a shoe store, two hardware stores, a meat market, two lumber dealers, two agriculture implement dealers, a bank, two furniture stores, a clothing store, a barber shop, two saloons, a music store, two jewelry stores, a restaurant, four blacksmiths, two elevators, and a gristmill.

Halvor H. Peterson (1831–1917), Wisconsin State Assemblyman and farmer, lived in Alta.

== Geography ==
Alta is located six miles from the city of Storm Lake and is approximately seven miles from Aurelia, and is located on Highway 7.

According to the United States Census Bureau, the city has a total area of 1.07 square miles (2.77 km^{2}), all land.

== Demographics ==
Historical populations
Year	Pop.	±%
1880	423	—
1890	768	+81.6%
1900	861	+12.1%
1910	959	+11.4%
1920	1,290	+34.5%
1930	1,297	+0.5%
1940	1,269	−2.2%
1950	1,348	+6.2%
1960	1,393	+3.3%
1970	1,717	+23.3%
1980	1,720	+0.2%
1990	1,820	+5.8%
2000	1,865	+2.5%
2010	1,883	+1.0%
2020	2,087	+10.8%
Source:"U.S. Census website". United States Census Bureau. and Iowa Data Center; Source: U.S. Decennial Census

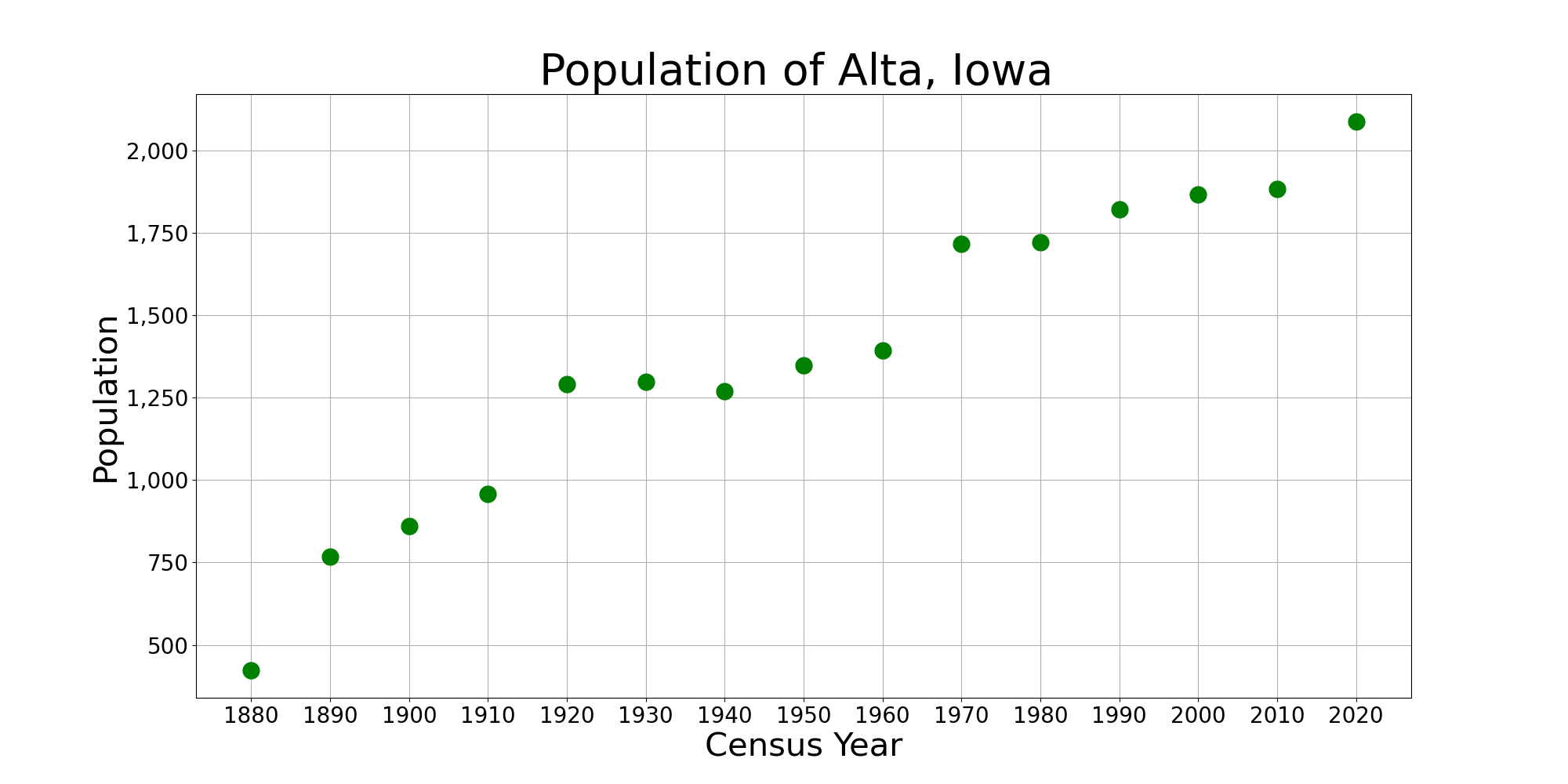
The population of Alta, Iowa from US census data

=== 2020 census ===
As of the 2020 census, there were 2,087 people, 776 households, and 519 families residing in the city. The population density was 1,935.5 inhabitants per square mile (747.3/km^{2}). There were 835 housing units at an average density of 774.4 per square mile (299.0/km^{2}).

0.0% of residents lived in urban areas, while 100.0% lived in rural areas.

Of the households, 34.9% had children under the age of 18 living with them. 51.5% were married couples living together, 8.4% were cohabitating couples, 22.2% had a female householder with no spouse or partner present, and 17.9% had a male householder with no spouse or partner present. 33.1% of all households were non-families. 28.1% of all households were made up of individuals, and 13.1% had someone living alone who was 65 years old or older.

Of the housing units, 7.1% were vacant. The homeowner vacancy rate was 2.9% and the rental vacancy rate was 8.0%.

The median age in the city was 34.4 years. 28.9% of residents were under the age of 18 and 16.7% were 65 years of age or older. 31.2% of residents were under the age of 20; 6.8% were between the ages of 20 and 24; 24.1% were from 25 to 44; and 21.2% were from 45 to 64. For every 100 females there were 99.1 males, and for every 100 females age 18 and over there were 98.3 males age 18 and over. The gender makeup of the city was 49.8% male and 50.2% female.

Racial composition as of the 2020 census
Race	Number	Percent
White	1,611	77.2%
Black or African American	34	1.6%
American Indian and Alaska Native	25	1.2%
Asian	26	1.2%
Native Hawaiian and Other Pacific Islander	65	3.1%
Some other race	162	7.8%
Two or more races	164	7.9%
Hispanic or Latino (of any race)	485	23.2%

=== 2010 census ===
As of the census of 2010, there were 1,883 people, 759 households, and 509 families residing in the city. The population density was 1,759.8 inhabitants per square mile (679.5/km^{2}). There were 838 housing units at an average density of 783.2 per square mile (302.4/km^{2}). The racial makeup was 91.3% White, 1.6% African American, 0.2% Native American, 1.2% Asian, 4.7% from other races, and 1.1% from two or more races. Hispanic or Latino of any race were 15.7% of the population.

There were 759 households, of which 31.8% had children under the age of 18 living with them, 52.3% were married couples living together, 10.4% had a female householder with no husband present, 4.3% had a male householder with no wife present, and 32.9% were non-families. 28.5% of all households were made up of individuals, and 14.7% had someone living alone who was 65 years of age or older. The average household size was 2.48 and the average family size was 3.02.

The median age was 36.5 years. 27.1% of residents were under the age of 18; 8.5% were between the ages of 18 and 24; 23.2% were from 25 to 44; 24.3% were from 45 to 64; and 17% were 65 years of age or older. The gender makeup was 48.6% male and 51.4% female.

=== 2000 census ===
As of the census of 2000, there were 1,865 people, 726 households, and 506 families. The population density was 1,780.4 inhabitants per square mile (687.4/km^{2}). There were 791 housing units at an average density of 755.1 per square mile (291.5/km^{2}). The racial makeup of the city was 92.44% White, 0.64% African American, 0.05% Native American, 1.39% Asian, 0.05% Pacific Islander, 4.45% from other races, and 0.97% from two or more races. Hispanic or Latino of any race were 10.62% of the population.

There were 726 households, out of which 35.3% had children under the age of 18 living with them, 55.4% were married couples living together, 9.9% had a female householder with no husband present, and 30.3% were non-families. 25.8% of all households were made up of individuals, and 14.2% had someone living alone who was 65 years of age or older. The average household size was 2.56 and the average family size was 3.07.

29.7% are under the age of 18, 7.7% from 18 to 24, 28.3% from 25 to 44, 18.5% from 45 to 64, and 15.9% were 65 years of age or older. The median age was 35 years. For every 100 females, there were 96.9 males. For every 100 females age 18 and over, there were 91.1 males.

The median income for a household in the city was $31,941, and the median income for a family was $40,694. Males had a median income of $29,655 versus $20,368 for females. The per capita income for the city was $15,908. About 8.5% of families and 11.3% of the population were below the poverty line, including 12.9% of those under age 18 and 5.0% of those age 65 or over.

== Education ==
Alta is within the Alta–Aurelia Community School District. It was in the Alta Community School District, which previously operated Alta High School.

The two districts merged into Alta–Aurelia on July 1, 2018.

== See also ==
- List of cities in Iowa
