= Aurelia, Iowa =

- City
- Bandstand in Aurelia

- Location of Aurelia, Iowa
- Coordinates: 42°42′47″N 95°26′13″W
- Country: USA
- State: Iowa
- County: Cherokee

Government

Area
  - Total: 1.02 sq mi (2.63 km^{2})
  - Land: 1.02 sq mi (2.63 km^{2})
  - Water: 0 sq mi (0.00 km^{2})
- Elevation: 1,388 ft (423 m)

Population (2020)
  - Total: 968
  - Density: 954.3/sq mi (368.44/km^{2})
- Time zone: UTC-6 (Central (CST))
  - Summer (DST): UTC-5 (CDT)
- ZIP code: 51005
- Area code: 712
- FIPS code: 19-03745
- GNIS feature ID: 2394029

Aurelia is a city in Cherokee County, Iowa, United States. The population was 968 at the 2020 census.

== History ==
Aurelia was founded in 1873 as a stop along the Illinois Central Railroad branch connecting Sioux City, Iowa, to Chicago, Illinois. This was the only railroad connecting the two Midwestern hubs and so gave birth to many railroad towns. Aurelia was named for the youngest daughter of the owner of the railroad, John Insley Blair, who died in 1866. The location of Aurelia was only set after a last minute change in the railroad design that saw it redirect to go through LeMars and Cherokee, rather than connect Sioux City directly to Storm Lake. Almost 70% of Aurelia's population is people over age 50. Its newspaper is the Aurelia Star which was founded in March 1881 as the Aurelia Sentinel.

== Geography ==
According to the United States Census Bureau, the city has a total area of 1.04 square miles (2.69 km^{2}), all land.

== Demographics ==
Historical population
Census	Pop.	Note	%±
1880	225		—
1890	663		194.7%
1900	621		−6.3%
1910	625		0.6%
1920	708		13.3%
1930	723		2.1%
1940	752		4.0%
1950	807		7.3%
1960	904		12.0%
1970	1,065		17.8%
1980	1,143		7.3%
1990	1,034		−9.5%
2000	1,062		2.7%
2010	1,036		−2.4%
2020	968		−6.6%
U.S. Decennial Census

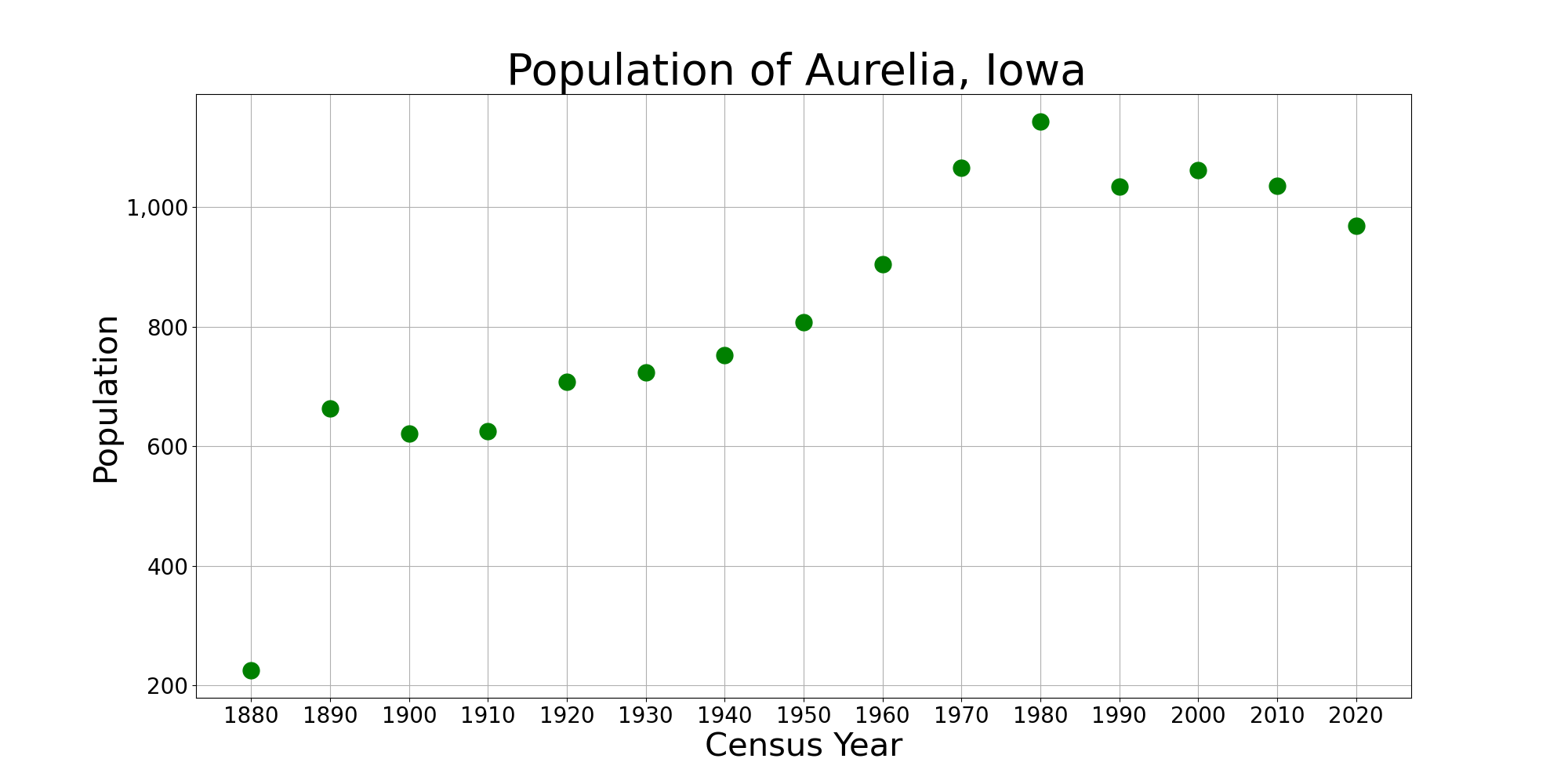
The population of Aurelia, Iowa from US census data

=== 2020 census ===
As of the census of 2020, there were 968 people, 402 households, and 271 families residing in the city. The population density was 954.3 inhabitants per square mile (368.4/km^{2}). There were 441 housing units at an average density of 434.7 per square mile (167.9/km^{2}). The racial makeup of the city was 91.3% White, 0.0% Black or African American, 0.8% Native American, 0.1% Asian, 0.6% Pacific Islander, 2.2% from other races and 5.0% from two or more races. Hispanic or Latino persons of any race comprised 6.6% of the population.

Of the 402 households, 26.6% of which had children under the age of 18 living with them, 53.7% were married couples living together, 6.7% were cohabitating couples, 22.9% had a female householder with no spouse or partner present and 16.7% had a male householder with no spouse or partner present. 32.6% of all households were non-families. 28.9% of all households were made up of individuals, 15.9% had someone living alone who was 65 years old or older.

The median age in the city was 43.9 years. 25.1% of the residents were under the age of 20; 4.4% were between the ages of 20 and 24; 21.7% were from 25 and 44; 23.9% were from 45 and 64; and 24.9% were 65 years of age or older. The gender makeup of the city was 49.2% male and 50.8% female.

=== 2010 census ===
As of the census of 2010, there were 1,036 people, 426 households, and 299 families living in the city. The population density was 996.2 inhabitants per square mile (384.6/km^{2}). There were 447 housing units at an average density of 429.8 per square mile (165.9/km^{2}). The racial makeup of the city was 96.3% White, 0.3% African American, 0.2% Native American, 0.6% Asian, 1.6% from other races, and 1.0% from two or more races. Hispanic or Latino of any race were 2.6% of the population.

There were 426 households, of which 27.7% had children under the age of 18 living with them, 59.9% were married couples living together, 7.5% had a female householder with no husband present, 2.8% had a male householder with no wife present, and 29.8% were non-families. 26.8% of all households were made up of individuals, and 13.6% had someone living alone who was 65 years of age or older. The average household size was 2.35 and the average family size was 2.84.

The median age in the city was 45.2 years. 22.6% of residents were under the age of 18; 6.6% were between the ages of 18 and 24; 20.4% were from 25 to 44; 26.4% were from 45 to 64; and 23.8% were 65 years of age or older. The gender makeup of the city was 49.5% male and 50.5% female.

=== 2000 census ===
As of the census of 2000, there were 1,062 people, 424 households, and 295 families living in the city. The population density was 1,015.2 inhabitants per square mile (392.0/km^{2}). There were 469 housing units at an average density of 448.3 per square mile (173.1/km^{2}). The racial makeup of the city was 98.87% White, 0.09% African American, 0.19% Asian, 0.75% from other races, and 0.09% from two or more races. Hispanic or Latino of any race were 0.85% of the population.

There were 424 households, out of which 30.0% had children under the age of 18 living with them, 62.0% were married couples living together, 6.6% had a female householder with no husband present, and 30.2% were non-families. 27.1% of all households were made up of individuals, and 15.3% had someone living alone who was 65 years of age or older. The average household size was 2.36 and the average family size was 2.88.

23.6% were under the age of 18, 5.9% from 18 to 24, 23.1% from 25 to 44, 18.8% from 45 to 64, and 28.5% were 65 years of age or older. The median age was 43 years. For every 100 females, there were 91.4 males. For every 100 females age 18 and over, there were 82.7 males.

The median income for a household in the city was $37,250, and the median income for a family was $44,135. Males had a median income of $30,259 versus $19,333 for females. The per capita income for the city was $17,417. About 3.0% of families and 5.7% of the population were below the poverty line, including 6.7% of those under age 18 and 4.1% of those age 65 or over.

== Education ==
It is within the Alta–Aurelia Community School District. It was in the Aurelia Community School District until it merged into Alta–Aurelia on July 1, 2018.

Aurelia houses one of the two K–4 elementary schools in the district and the sole middle school, which serves grades 5–8. The high school is in Alta.
