= Levey Township, Sac County, Iowa =

Township in Sac County, Iowa, U.S.

Coordinates: 42°15′14″N 95°08′55″W

Levey Township is a township in Sac County, Iowa, United States. Part of Wall Lake is within Levey Township.

== Geography ==
The township's total area is 35.48 square miles, of which 0.1 square miles are water, and its elevation is listed as 1355 feet above mean sea level. The Boyer River flows through Levey Township.

== Demographics ==
As of 2018, Levey Township was estimated to have 754 residents, 100% of whom were white.

== History ==
Levey Township was first settled in 1869, with its first settler being Charles Levey, and incorporated in 1871, but its government was not organized until 1873 due to its small population. Its first township assessor F. W. Weed. Levery Township's first school was established in 1873 by Fannie Philbrick. The township was named for C. N. Levey, an early settler and official in the county. Several railroads ran through the county, including the Illinois Central Railroad, and the Mondamin and Onawa railways. Levey Township used to contain the town of Herring (formerly Weed) and the hamlet of McCloy, which no longer exist.

== Education ==
Levey Township is in the East Sac County Community School District.
