= Sac County, Iowa =

County in Iowa, United States

- County
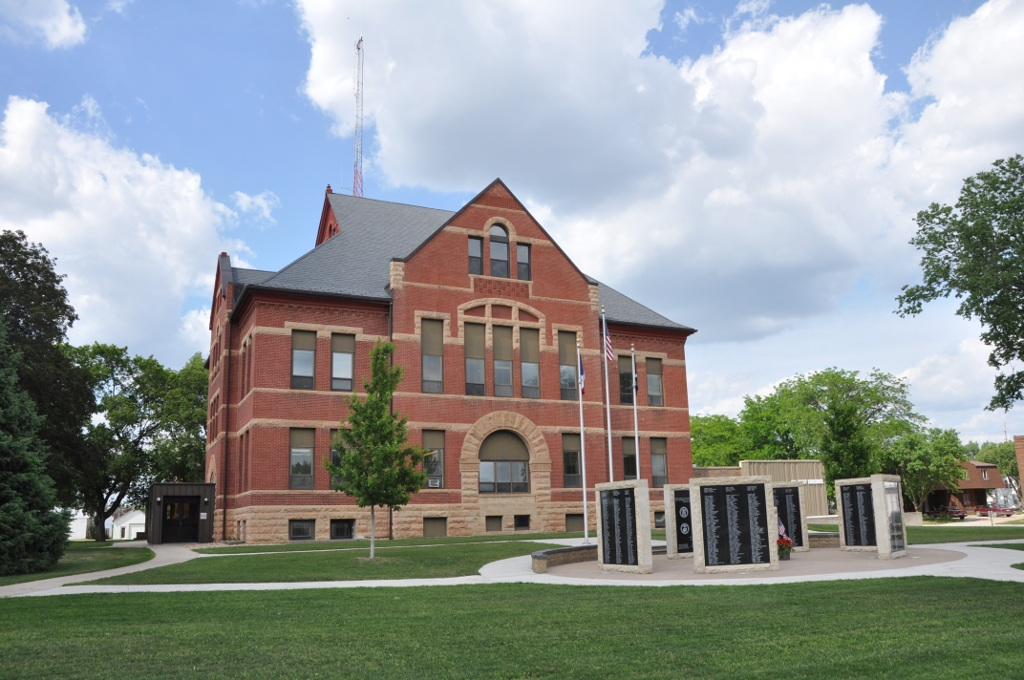
- The Sac County Courthouse in Sac City

- Location within the U.S. state of Iowa
- Coordinates: 42°22′52″N 95°06′46″W
- Country: United States
- State: Iowa
- Founded: January 15, 1851
- Named for: Sac and Fox Nation
- Seat: Sac City
- Largest city: Sac City

Area
  - Total: 578 sq mi (1,500 km^{2})
  - Land: 575 sq mi (1,490 km^{2})
  - Water: 3.3 sq mi (8.5 km^{2}) 0.6%

Population (2020)
  - Total: 9,814
  - Estimate (2025): 9,525 ▼
  - Density: 17.1/sq mi (6.59/km^{2})
- Time zone: UTC−6 (Central)
  - Summer (DST): UTC−5 (CDT)
- Congressional district: 4th
- Website: www.saccountyiowa.gov
- Iowa county number 81

Sac County is a county located in the U.S. state of Iowa. As of the 2020 census, the population was 9,814. The county seat and the largest city is Sac City. Both were named for the Sauk people, a local Native American tribe.

In February 2007, in its third annual list of the “Best Places to Live in Rural America”, Progressive Farmer magazine placed Sac County as #7 in the overall rankings. In 2009, the magazine ranked Sac County as the tenth "Best Place" in the Midwest Region.

== History ==
On January 13, 1846, the legislative body of the Iowa Territory authorized creation of twelve counties, with general descriptions of their boundaries. This brought the number of counties in the Iowa Territory to 22.

By the end of 1846, the territory had been accepted into the Union as the State of Iowa (December 28, 1846). By 1851, the new state had grown to the extent that the original 22 counties needed to be divided into smaller, more accessible units. Accordingly, on January 15, 1851, the Iowa General Assembly enacted an omnibus bill which created 43 new counties by reducing the previous counties. Sac County was named after the Sauk people, at that time called the Sac Indians.

It took some time for the new organization to fully function. Sac City was designated the county seat in 1856, and construction of the first county courthouse was complete in 1862. By 1873 the burgeoning population had outgrown that structure and a larger (85 x 56 feet brick) building was authorized to replace it.

The new courthouse, complete with impressive bell tower, was placed in service in January 1874, and was used until 1888 when it burned.

To replace that structure, the present courthouse was built. It was enlarged and remodeled in the 1980s.

== Geography ==
According to the United States Census Bureau, the county has a total area of 578 square miles (1,500 km^{2}), of which 575 square miles (1,490 km^{2}) is land and 3.3 square miles (8.5 km^{2}) (0.6%) is water.

=== Major highways ===
- U.S. Highway 20 – runs east–west through the northern part of the county, through Early and north of Sac City.
- U.S. Highway 71 – from its intersection with US 20 (east of Sac City), runs south, turns 4 miles east to Auburn, then continues south into Carroll County.
- Iowa Highway 39 – from its intersection with Iowa 175 at Odebolt, runs south into Crawford County.
- Iowa Highway 110 – from its intersection with US 20, runs north into Buena Vista County.
- Iowa Highway 175 – enters west side of county at Odebolt, runs east to intersection with US 71, east of Lake View.

=== Adjacent counties ===
- Buena Vista County – north
- Calhoun County – east
- Carroll County – south and southeast
- Cherokee County – northwest
- Crawford County – south and southwest
- Ida County – west
- Pocahontas County - northeast

== Demographics ==
Historical population
Census	Pop.	Note	%±
1860	246		—
1870	1,411		473.6%
1880	8,774		521.8%
1890	14,522		65.5%
1900	17,639		21.5%
1910	16,555		−6.1%
1920	17,500		5.7%
1930	17,641		0.8%
1940	17,639		0.0%
1950	17,518		−0.7%
1960	17,007		−2.9%
1970	15,573		−8.4%
1980	14,118		−9.3%
1990	12,324		−12.7%
2000	11,529		−6.5%
2010	10,350		−10.2%
2020	9,814		−5.2%
2025 (est.)	9,525	▼	−2.9%
U.S. Decennial Census; 1790–1960 1900–1990; 1990–2000 2010–2020

=== 2020 census ===
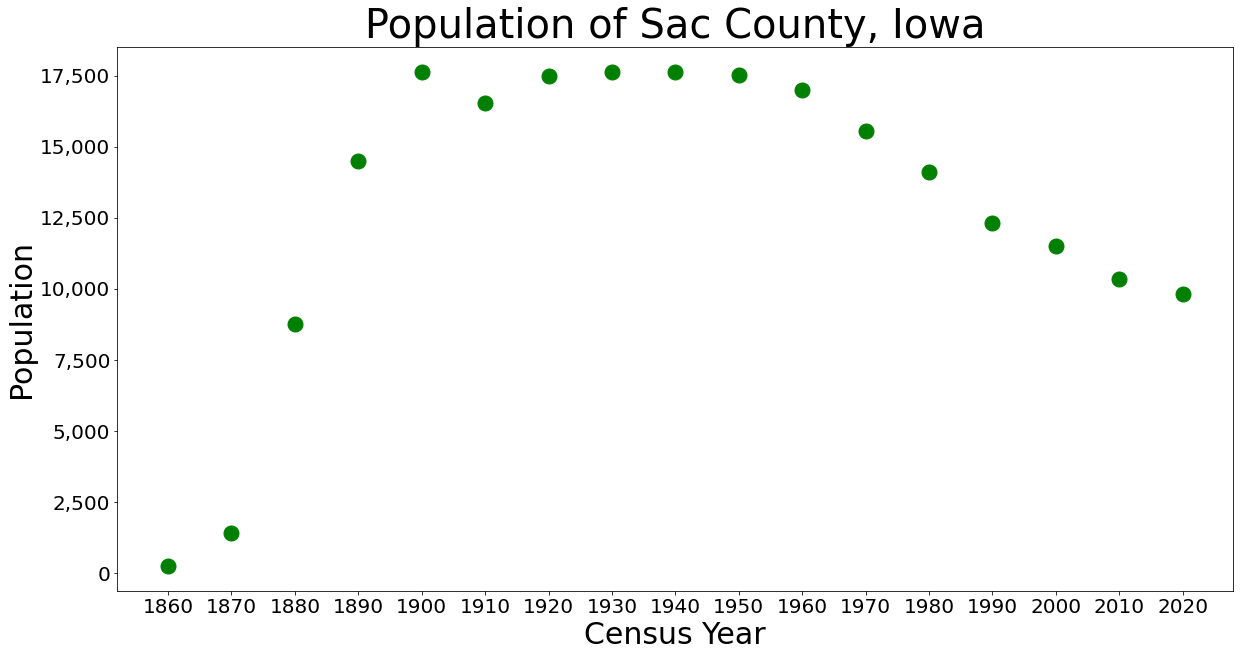
Population of Sac County from the U.S. census data

As of the 2020 census, the county had a population of 9,814 and a population density of 16.9/sq mi (6.5/km^{2}). The median age was 46.3 years. 22.4% of residents were under the age of 18 and 24.5% of residents were 65 years of age or older. For every 100 females there were 98.7 males, and for every 100 females age 18 and over there were 96.8 males age 18 and over.

97.09% of the population reported being of one race. Among those, 90.86% were non-Hispanic White, 0.47% were Black or African American, 0.11% were Native American, 0.32% were Asian, 0.09% were Native Hawaiian or Pacific Islander, and 4.54% were some other race or more than one race. The racial makeup was 94.5% White, 0.5% Black or African American, 0.1% American Indian and Alaska Native, 0.3% Asian, 0.1% Native Hawaiian and Pacific Islander, 1.6% from some other race, and 2.9% from two or more races; Hispanic or Latino residents of any race comprised 3.6% of the population.

Less than 0.1% of residents lived in urban areas, while 100.0% lived in rural areas.

There were 4,273 households in the county, of which 24.9% had children under the age of 18 living in them. Of all households, 51.1% were married-couple households, 19.2% were households with a male householder and no spouse or partner present, and 23.4% were households with a female householder and no spouse or partner present. About 31.8% of all households were made up of individuals and 16.3% had someone living alone who was 65 years of age or older. There were 5,118 housing units, of which 16.5% were vacant. Among occupied housing units, 79.4% were owner-occupied and 20.6% were renter-occupied. The homeowner vacancy rate was 2.4% and the rental vacancy rate was 10.8%.

=== 2010 census ===
As of the 2010 census recorded a population of 10,350 in the county, with a population density of 17.974/sq mi (6.940/km^{2}). There were 5,429 housing units, of which 4,482 were occupied.

=== 2000 census ===
As of the 2000 census, there were 11,529 people, 4,746 households, and 3,198 families residing in the county. The population density was 20 people per square mile (7.7 people/km^{2}). There were 5,460 housing units at an average density of 10 units per square mile (3.9 units/km^{2}). The racial makeup of the county was 98.53% White, 0.26% Black or African American, 0.09% Native American, 0.14% Asian, 0.02% Pacific Islander, 0.40% from other races, and 0.57% from two or more races. 0.96% of the population were Hispanic or Latino of any race.

There were 4,746 households, out of which 28.60% had children under the age of 18 living with them, 58.30% were married couples living together, 6.20% had a female householder with no husband present, and 32.60% were non-families. 29.40% of all households were made up of individuals, and 16.40% had someone living alone who was 65 years of age or older. The average household size was 2.37 and the average family size was 2.92.

In the county, the population was spread out, with 24.10% under the age of 18, 6.90% from 18 to 24, 23.50% from 25 to 44, 22.80% from 45 to 64, and 22.70% who were 65 years of age or older. The median age was 42 years. For every 100 females there were 95.50 males. For every 100 females age 18 and over, there were 91.80 males.

The median income for a household in the county was $32,874, and the median income for a family was $40,504. Males had a median income of $26,183 versus $19,753 for females. The per capita income for the county was $16,902. About 6.80% of families and 9.90% of the population were below the poverty line, including 14.00% of those under age 18 and 8.20% of those age 65 or over.

== Education ==
School districts include:

- Alta–Aurelia Community School District
- East Sac County Community School District - Formed on July 1, 2011.
- Galva–Holstein Community School District
- Newell-Fonda Community School District
- Odebolt–Arthur–Battle Creek–Ida Grove Community School District - Formed on July 1, 2018.
- Schaller-Crestland Community School District
- South Central Calhoun Community School District - Formed on July 1, 2014.
- Storm Lake Community School District

Three districts are based in the county: East Sac County Community School District (ESC) is the largest school district in Sac County, with the Schaller-Crestland Community School District serving the northwestern portion of the county and Odebolt–Arthur Community School District serving the southwest part. Successful completion of the curriculum of these schools leads to graduation from East Sac County High School, OA-BCIG High School, or Ridge View High School respectively. Only ESC HS is located in Sac County, with OA-BCIG HS in Ida Grove and Ridge View in Holstein.

Residents outside the three Sac County-based districts are within either the South Central Calhoun Community School District in areas around Lytton. A small part of northwestern Sac County is within the Galva–Holstein Community School District, which shares Ridge View High School with Schaller-Crestland SD.

Former school districts include:

- Odebolt–Arthur Community School District - Merged into OABIG on July 1, 2018.
- Rockwell City–Lytton Community School District - Merged into South Central Calhoun on July 1, 2014.
- Southern Cal Community School District - Merged into South Central Calhoun on July 1, 2014.
- Wall Lake View Auburn Community School District - Formed on July 1, 1996, and merged into East Sac County on July 1, 2011.

== Geocaching ==
Sac County is a rich area for geocaching. The county was "put on the map" when geocachers hid a series of caches a mile wide and 8 miles high to spell "SAC" along rural roads between Sac City and Lytton in August 2011.

== Communities ==
=== Cities ===
- Auburn
- Early
- Lake View
- Lytton
- Nemaha
- Odebolt
- Sac City (county seat)
- Schaller
- Wall Lake

=== Unincorporated communities ===
- Carnarvon
- Grant City
- Herring
- Ulmer

=== Townships ===
- Boyer Valley
- Cedar
- Clinton
- Cook
- Coon Valley
- Delaware
- Douglas
- Eden
- Eureka
- Jackson
- Levey
- Richland
- Sac
- Viola
- Wall Lake
- Wheeler

=== Population ranking ===
The population ranking of the following table is based on the 2020 census of Sac County.

† county seat

Rank	City/Town/etc.	Municipal type	Population (2020 Census)
1	† Sac City	City	2,063
2	Lake View	City	1,113
3	Odebolt	City	994
4	Wall Lake	City	755
5	Schaller	City	729
6	Early	City	587
7	Auburn	City	265
8	Lytton (partly in Calhoun County)	City	242 (282 total)
9	Nemaha	City	66

== Politics ==
The Democrats have only carried Sac County a total of 5 times since 1912: 1932 and 1936 by Franklin D. Roosevelt, 1948 by Harry S. Truman, 1964 by Lyndon B. Johnson, and 1988 by Michael Dukakis. Most of these in Democratic landslides, with 1988 being the notable big exception as Dukakis overperformed here, as he had almost everywhere else in Iowa, due to the farm crisis of the 1980s.

United States presidential election results for Sac County, Iowa
Year	Republican		Democratic		Third party(ies)	
Year	No.	%	No.	%	No.	%
1896	2,513	64.14%	1,346	34.35%	59	1.51%
1900	2,786	67.38%	1,214	29.36%	135	3.26%
1904	2,609	72.43%	835	23.18%	158	4.39%
1908	2,366	64.02%	1,230	33.28%	100	2.71%
1912	622	16.97%	1,124	30.67%	1,919	52.36%
1916	2,057	55.03%	1,629	43.58%	52	1.39%
1920	4,984	78.69%	1,268	20.02%	82	1.29%
1924	3,970	60.65%	674	10.30%	1,902	29.06%
1928	4,461	64.48%	2,414	34.89%	43	0.62%
1932	3,131	42.49%	4,165	56.52%	73	0.99%
1936	3,437	42.84%	4,472	55.74%	114	1.42%
1940	4,358	53.66%	3,754	46.23%	9	0.11%
1944	3,770	53.63%	3,223	45.85%	37	0.53%
1948	3,505	47.60%	3,699	50.24%	159	2.16%
1952	6,417	72.15%	2,451	27.56%	26	0.29%
1956	4,874	59.99%	3,248	39.98%	3	0.04%
1960	4,850	61.36%	3,054	38.64%	0	0.00%
1964	2,937	40.22%	4,358	59.68%	7	0.10%
1968	4,182	62.64%	2,207	33.06%	287	4.30%
1972	4,017	61.41%	2,452	37.49%	72	1.10%
1976	3,347	51.55%	2,996	46.14%	150	2.31%
1980	3,725	59.47%	1,976	31.55%	563	8.99%
1984	3,298	57.57%	2,363	41.25%	68	1.19%
1988	2,411	47.49%	2,613	51.47%	53	1.04%
1992	2,138	41.00%	1,896	36.36%	1,181	22.65%
1996	2,209	44.21%	2,170	43.43%	618	12.37%
2000	2,776	55.16%	2,099	41.70%	158	3.14%
2004	3,128	58.21%	2,215	41.22%	31	0.58%
2008	2,705	53.53%	2,256	44.65%	92	1.82%
2012	3,094	58.48%	2,122	40.11%	75	1.42%
2016	3,703	71.05%	1,270	24.37%	239	4.59%
2020	4,061	73.37%	1,389	25.09%	85	1.54%
2024	4,100	75.09%	1,289	23.61%	71	1.30%

== See also ==
- Sac County Courthouse
- National Register of Historic Places listings in Sac County, Iowa
