= Arthur, Iowa =

- City
- Location of Arthur, Iowa
- Coordinates: 42°20′07″N 95°20′49″W
- Country: USA
- State: Iowa
- County: Ida

Area
  - Total: 0.15 sq mi (0.38 km^{2})
  - Land: 0.15 sq mi (0.38 km^{2})
  - Water: 0 sq mi (0.00 km^{2})
- Elevation: 1,299 ft (396 m)

Population (2020)
  - Total: 222
  - Density: 1,514.4/sq mi (584.71/km^{2})
- Time zone: UTC-6 (Central (CST))
  - Summer (DST): UTC-5 (CDT)
- ZIP code: 51431
- Area code: 712
- FIPS code: 19-03115
- GNIS feature ID: 2393993

Arthur is a city in Ida County, Iowa, United States. The population was 222 at the 2020 census.

== History ==
Arthur was platted in 1885. It was named for Chester A. Arthur, 21st President of the United States.

== Geography ==
According to the United States Census Bureau, the city has a total area of 0.15 square miles (0.39 km^{2}), all land.

== Demographics ==
Historical populations
Year	Pop.	±%
1900	162	—
1910	215	+32.7%
1920	290	+34.9%
1930	249	−14.1%
1940	254	+2.0%
1950	243	−4.3%
1960	265	+9.1%
1970	273	+3.0%
1980	288	+5.5%
1990	272	−5.6%
2000	245	−9.9%
2010	206	−15.9%
2020	222	+7.8%
Source:"U.S. Census website". United States Census Bureau. and Iowa Data Center; Source: U.S. Decennial Census

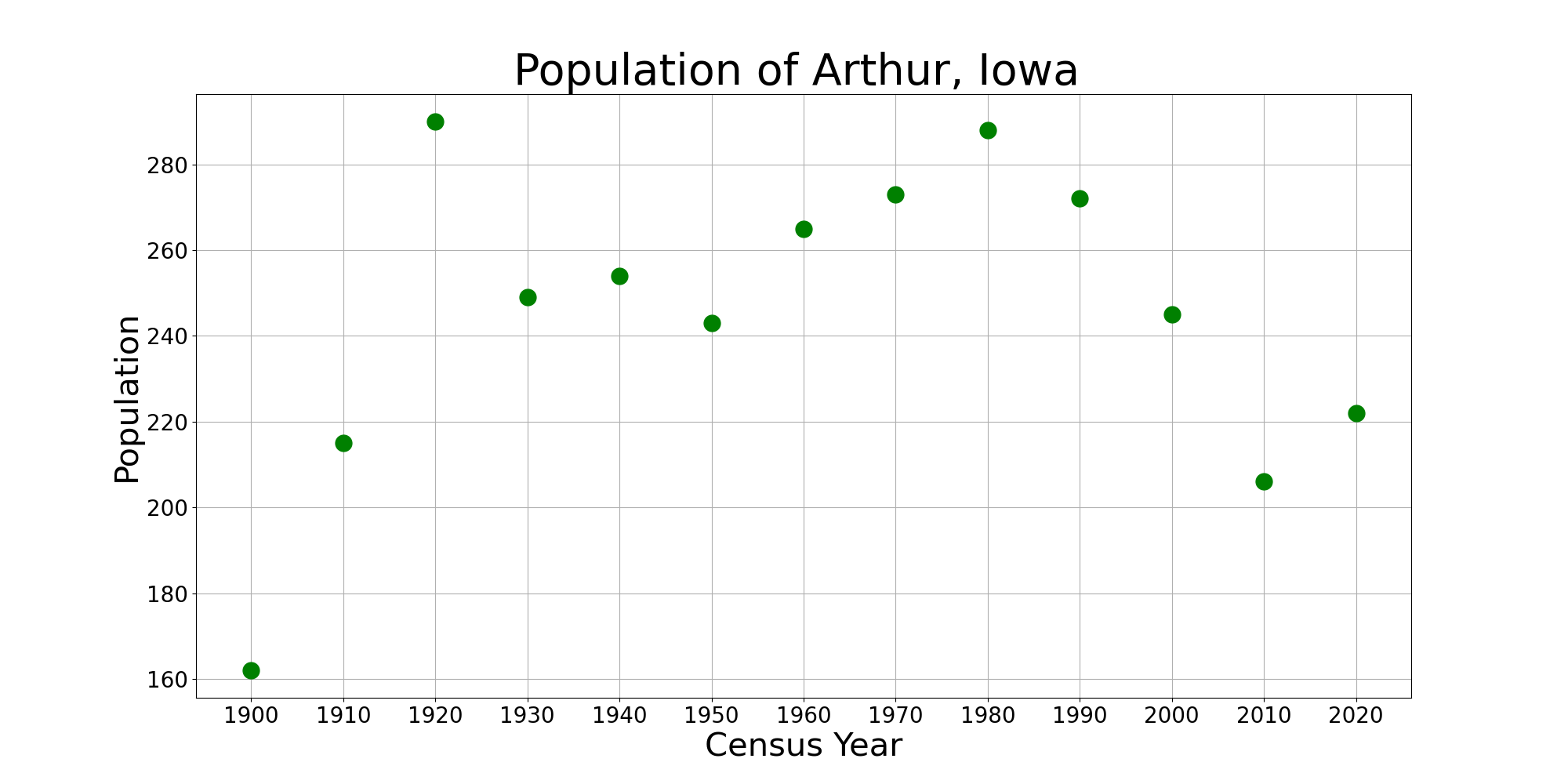
The population of Arthur, Iowa from US census data

=== 2020 census ===
As of the census of 2020, there were 222 people, 95 households, and 59 families residing in the city. The population density was 1,514.4 inhabitants per square mile (584.7/km^{2}). There were 111 housing units at an average density of 757.2 per square mile (292.4/km^{2}). The racial makeup of the city was 94.6% White, 0.0% Black or African American, 0.0% Native American, 0.5% Asian, 0.0% Pacific Islander, 1.8% from other races and 3.2% from two or more races. Hispanic or Latino people of any race comprised 2.3% of the population.

Of the 95 households, 34.7% of which had children under the age of 18 living with them, 40.0% were married couples living together, 7.4% were cohabitating couples, 35.8% had a female householder with no spouse or partner present and 16.8% had a male householder with no spouse or partner present. 37.9% of all households were non-families. 33.7% of all households were made up of individuals, 10.5% had someone living alone who was 65 years old or older.

The median age in the city was 38.8 years. 25.2% of the residents were under the age of 20; 5.9% were between the ages of 20 and 24; 29.3% were from 25 and 44; 24.8% were from 45 and 64; and 14.9% were 65 years of age or older. The gender makeup of the city was 48.2% male and 51.8% female.

=== 2010 census ===
As of the census of 2010, there were 206 people, 95 households, and 60 families residing in the city. The population density was 1,373.3 inhabitants per square mile (530.2/km^{2}). There were 113 housing units at an average density of 753.3 per square mile (290.9/km^{2}). The racial makeup of the city was 98.1% White, 0.5% African American, and 1.5% from other races. Hispanic or Latino people of any race were 1.5% of the population.

There were 95 households, of which 24.2% had children under the age of 18 living with them, 48.4% were married couples living together, 7.4% had a female householder with no husband present, 7.4% had a male householder with no wife present, and 36.8% were non-families. 31.6% of all households were made up of individuals, and 21% had someone living alone who was 65 years of age or older. The average household size was 2.17 and the average family size was 2.68.

The median age in the city was 47.5 years. 20.9% of residents were under the age of 18; 4.9% were between the ages of 18 and 24; 21.4% were from 25 to 44; 31.1% were from 45 to 64; and 21.8% were 65 years of age or older. The gender makeup of the city was 48.5% male and 51.5% female.

=== 2000 census ===
As of the census of 2000, there were 245 people, 112 households, and 62 families residing in the city. The population density was 1,600.1 inhabitants per square mile (617.8/km^{2}). There were 117 housing units at an average density of 764.1 per square mile (295.0/km^{2}). The racial makeup of the city was 100.00% White.

There were 112 households, out of which 27.7% had children under the age of 18 living with them, 49.1% were married couples living together, 3.6% had a female householder with no husband present, and 44.6% were non-families. 42.9% of all households were made up of individuals, and 29.5% had someone living alone who was 65 years of age or older. The average household size was 2.19 and the average family size was 3.08.

In the city, the population was spread out, with 26.5% under the age of 18, 7.3% from 18 to 24, 24.5% from 25 to 44, 17.6% from 45 to 64, and 24.1% who were 65 years of age or older. The median age was 41 years. For every 100 females, there were 81.5 males. For every 100 females age 18 and over, there were 81.8 males.

The median income for a household in the city was $25,833, and the median income for a family was $36,250. Males had a median income of $28,750 versus $17,500 for females. The per capita income for the city was $14,007. About 4.7% of families and 8.0% of the population were below the poverty line, including 6.7% of those under the age of eighteen and 10.2% of those 65 or over.

== Education ==
Arthur is a part of the Odebolt–Arthur–Battle Creek–Ida Grove Community School District. It was a part of the Odebolt–Arthur Community School District, until its merger with the Battle Creek–Ida Grove Community School District on July 1, 2018. Schools serving the community include OABCIG Elementary Odebolt in Odebolt, OABCIG Middle School in Odebolt, and OABCIG High School in Ida Grove.
