= Richland Township, Iowa =

Richland Township, Iowa can refer to:

- Richland Township, Adair County
- Richland Township, Carroll County
- Richland Township, Chickasaw County
- Richland Township, Decatur County
- Richland Township, Delaware County
- Richland Township, Dickinson County
- Richland Township, Franklin County
- Richland Township, Guthrie County
- Richland Township, Jackson County
- Richland Township, Jasper County
- Richland Township, Jones County
- Richland Township, Keokuk County
- Richland Township, Lyon County
- Richland Township, Mahaska County
- Richland Township, Sac County
- Richland Township, Story County
- Richland Township, Tama County
- Richland Township, Wapello County
- Richland Township, Warren County

See also

- Richland Township (disambiguation)
