= Douglas Township, Sac County, Iowa =

Township in Sac County, Iowa, U.S.

Coordinates: 42°31′03″N 94°58′25″W

Douglas Township is a township in Sac County, Iowa, United States.

== Geography ==
The township's elevation is listed as 1243 feet above mean sea level. It has a total area of 35.94 square miles.

== History ==
The first settlers of Douglas Township came in the mid-1850s, from other parts of the United States. Later, German families also came to the area. Douglas Township was separated from Jackson Township in 1860, and in 1875, Delaware Township was created out of territory in what was then Douglas Township.

== Demographics ==
As of the 2010 census, Douglas Township had 132 residents and 67 housing units.

== Education ==
Douglas Township is in the East Sac County Community School District.
