= Wall Lake Township =

Wall Lake Township may refer to the following places in the United States:

- Wall Lake Township, Sac County, Iowa
- Wall Lake Township, Wright County, Iowa
