= Odebolt–Arthur–Battle Creek–Ida Grove Community School District =

Public school district in Ida Grove, Iowa, United States

Coordinates: 42.335722°N 95.463115°W

Location
- Ida Grove, Iowa Crawford, Ida, Sac and Woodbury counties United States
- Coordinates: 42.335722, -95.463115

District information
- Type: Local school district
- Grades: K–12
- Established: 2018
- Superintendent: Matt Alexander
- Schools: 4
- Budget: $16,522,000 (2021–22)
- NCES District ID: 1921600

Students and staff
- Students: 960 (2022–23)
- Teachers: 75.09 FTE
- Staff: 84.65 FTE
- Student–teacher ratio: 12.78
- Athletic conference: Western Valley Activities Conference
- District mascot: Falcons
- Colors: Purple, Black, and Silver

Other information
- Website: www.oabcig.org

Odebolt–Arthur–Battle Creek–Ida Grove Community School District (OABCIG) is a rural public school district headquartered in Ida Grove, Iowa.

The consolidated district has territory in Crawford, Ida, Sac and Woodbury counties. Communities served include Ida Grove, Arthur, Battle Creek and Odebolt.

== History ==
The former Odebolt–Arthur Community School District and the Battle Creek–Ida Grove Community School District, in 2009, started a "grade sharing" in which the districts sent their children to the same high school and shared personnel. There was a previous attempt to merge the districts in fall 2016, but voters from Odebolt–Arthur voted it down out of fear that their school would close. There were tensions between the Odebolt–Arthur and Battle Creek–Ida Grove communities. By 2018 the merger was approved.

== Schools ==
- OABCIG High School (Ida Grove)
- OABCIG Middle School (Odebolt)
- OABCIG Elementary Odebolt (Odebolt)
- OABCIG Elementary Ida Grove (Ida Grove)

=== OABCIG High School ===
==== Athletics ====
The Falcons compete in the Western Valley Activities Conference in the following sports:

- Cross Country
- Volleyball
- Football
  - 2019 Class 2A State Champions
  - 2020 Class 1A State Champions
- Basketball
  - Girls' 2011 Class 2A State Champions
- Wrestling
- Track and Field
- Golf
- Baseball
- Softball
- Bowling

=== Notable alumni ===
- Cooper DeJean - Defensive back for the Philadelphia Eagles, Super Bowl LIX champion
- A. J. Schable - former defensive end for the Arizona Cardinals
- Cash Wilcke - Wrestler for the Iowa Hawkeyes

== See also ==
- List of school districts in Iowa
- List of high schools in Iowa
