= Clinton Township, Sac County, Iowa =

Township in Sac County, Iowa, U.S.

Coordinates: 42°20′29″N 95°08′52″W

Clinton Township is a township in Sac County, Iowa, United States.

== Geography ==
The township's elevation is listed as 1283 feet above mean sea level. It has a total area of 36.36 square miles.

== History ==
Clinton Township was founded in 1874. It was named for Clinton County, Iowa, from which many of its early residents came.

== Demographics ==
As of the 2010 census, Clinton township had a population of 175 and 73 housing units.

== Education ==
Clinton Township is part of the Odebolt–Arthur Community School District.
