= Grant City, Iowa =

- Unincorporated community
- Location within Iowa
- Coordinates: 42°16′03″N 94°53′16″W
- Country: United States
- State: Iowa
- County: Sac
- Elevation: 1,161 ft (354 m)
- Time zone: UTC-6 (Central (CST))
  - Summer (DST): UTC-5 (CDT)
- Area code: 712
- GNIS feature ID: 457062

Grant City is an unincorporated community in Sac County, in the U.S. state of Iowa. The community is located one mile north of Auburn, at the junction of Xavier Avenue and Yankee Avenue.

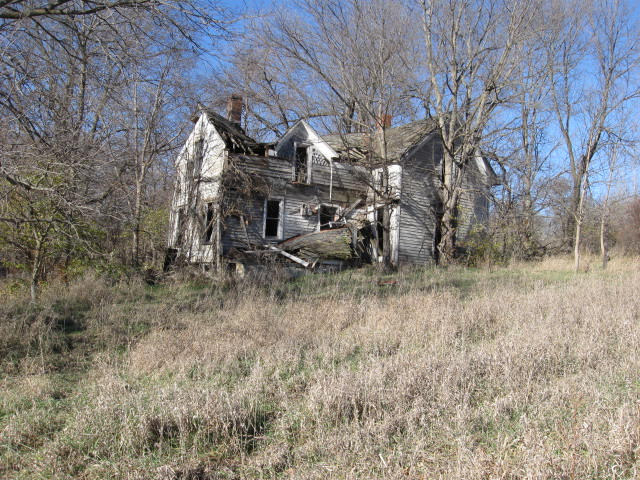
An original house in Grant City, Iowa; photo taken Nov 8 2023

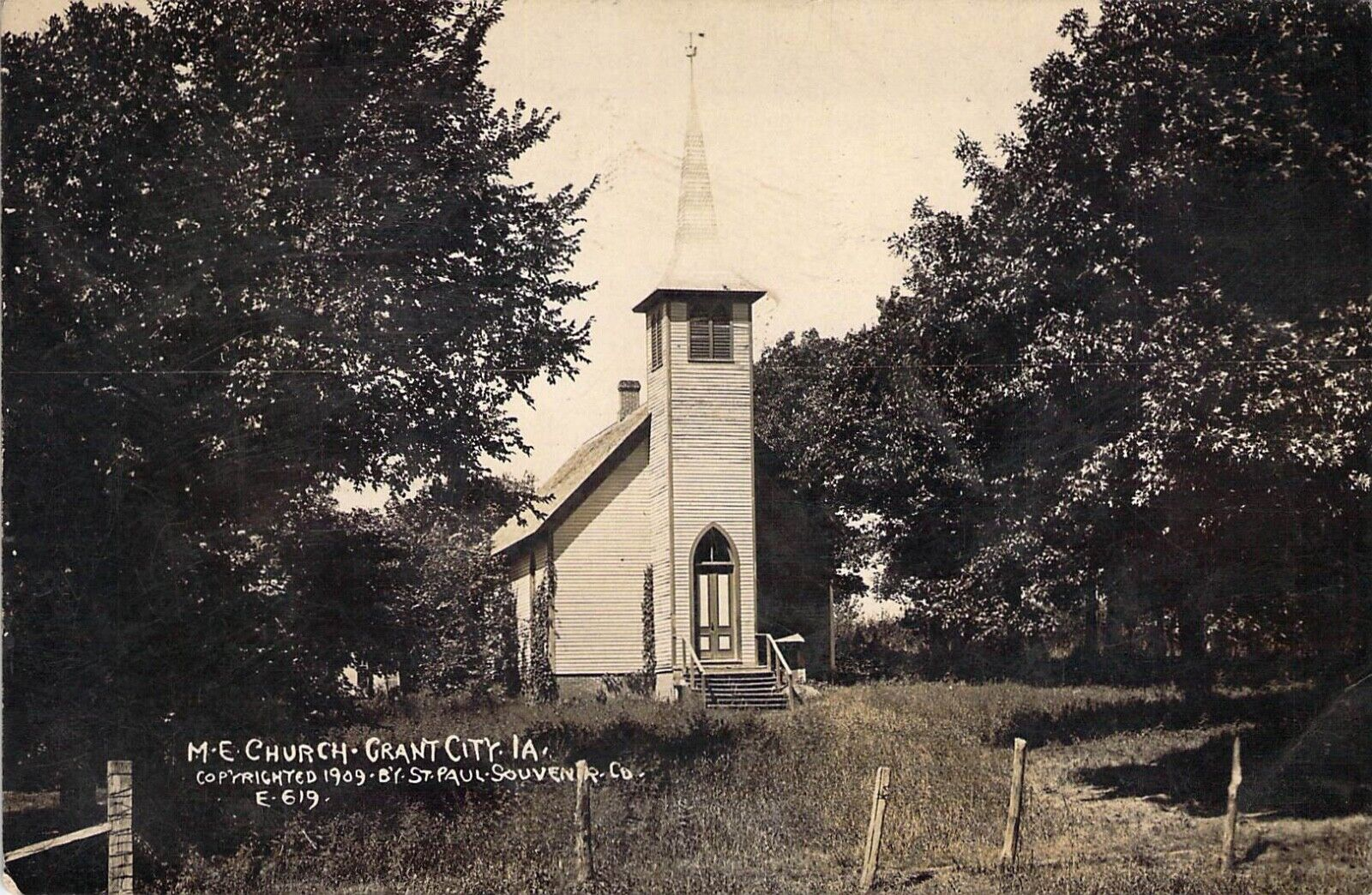
Methodist Episcopal Church in Grant City as of 1909

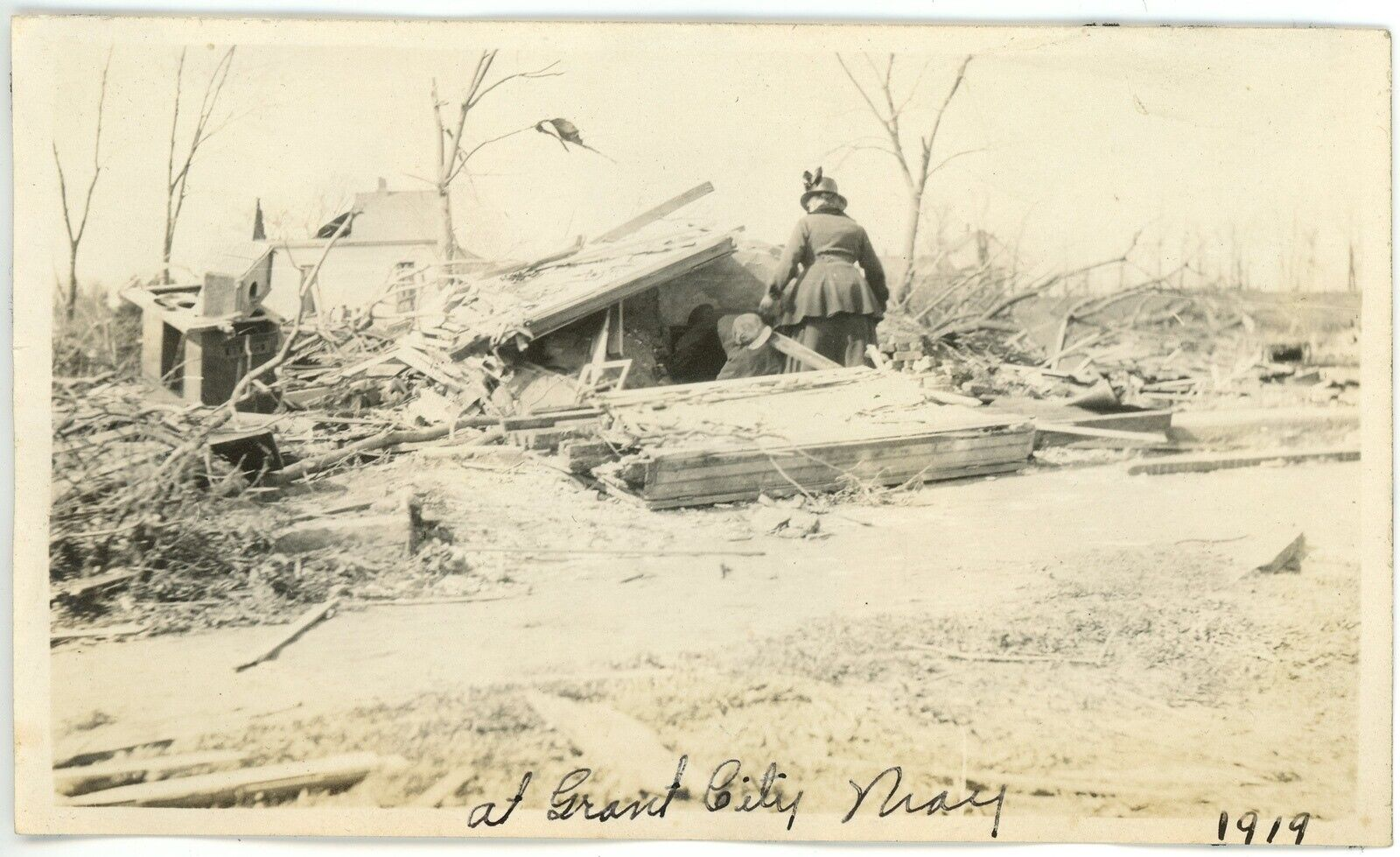
Grant City residents exiting a storm cellar 1919

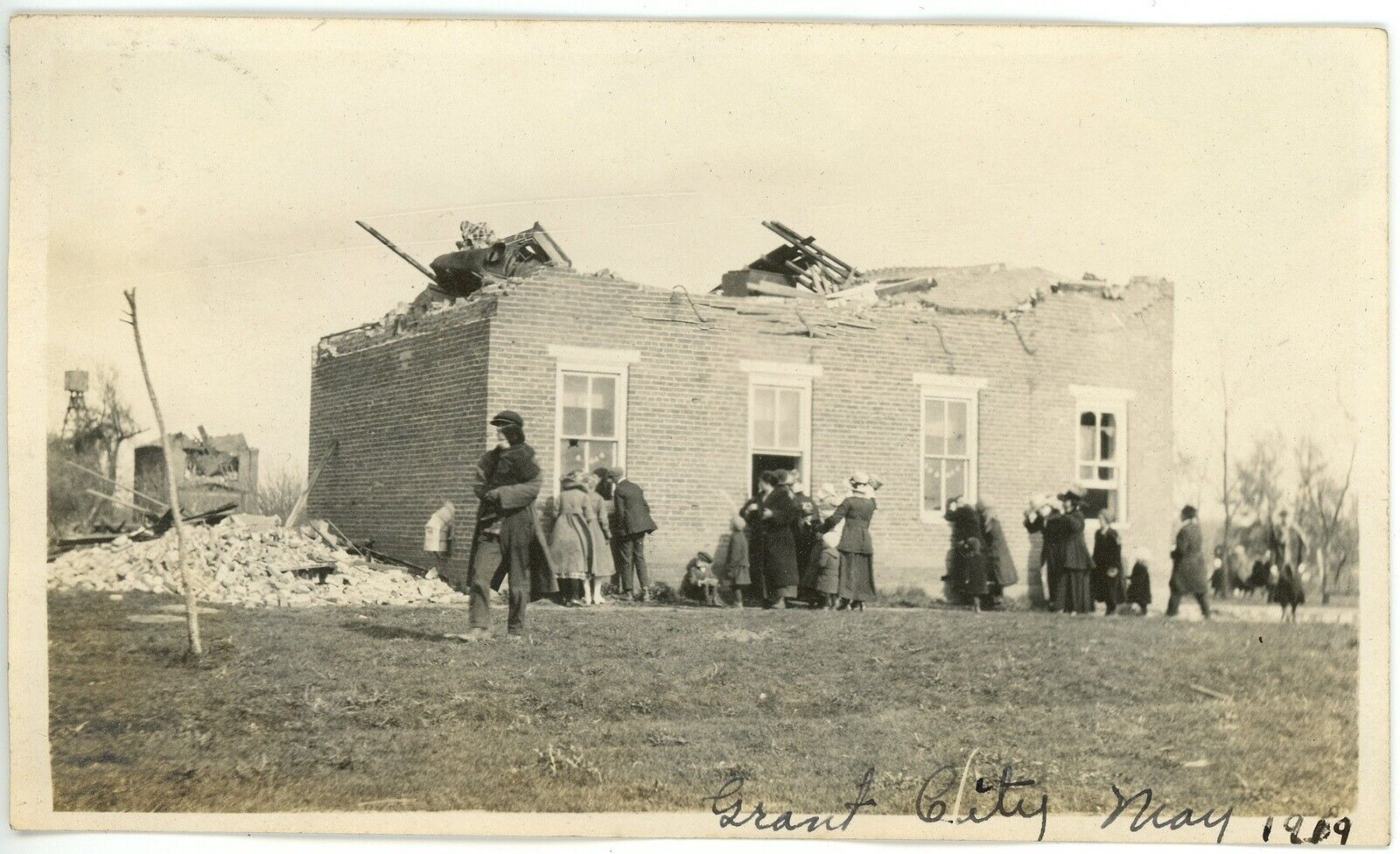
Grant City schoolhouse with 2nd story level blown off from the base by the 1919 tornado

== History ==
The earliest settlers came by oxen teams from Michigan in 1852 or 1853, with more to follow from Wisconsin and Ohio a few years later. The settlement began in a timbered, horse-shoe bend of the North Raccoon River, referred to as the "Coon River" on original plats. A post office was established at Grant City in 1862 and the town became a major center for the area in the 1860s, with a flour mill, saw mill, two-story brick schoolhouse, wagon shop, paint store, brick kiln, charcoal yard, hotel, dance hall, and a shingle factory. The brick kiln supplied brick for many of the buildings in the greater area and at one point was turning out 136 carloads a month, employing up to 60 men.

In 1874, when the Chicago and Northwestern Railway was being surveyed for a path through the town of Auburn, located a little more than a mile to the south, one of Grant City's prominent business men - John Gray Sr. - reportedly offered the railway company a thousand dollars to adjust the route north to catch Grant City, a sum apparently deemed insufficient to adequately offset the cost of trestle work needed to span the river valley. With the rail line using Auburn as a station point, much of the trade and general business activity would slowly shift to Auburn.

However, life continued in Grant City. A gothic-styled church [see photo] was erected in 1880 or 1881 on the northwest part of the village to serve the Methodist Episcopal denomination and a Seventh Day Adventist church was added a few years later.

A large and impressive indoor skating rink was built in 1884 on the west side of Main Street. It measured 100 feet deep and between 30 and 40 feet with lights, elevated windows, and no support columns which might obstruct the activities. A blacksmith and grocery store would be added to the list in the 1880s; the population was estimated at 250 in 1887 and may have been the peak for the community.

Unfortunately, the various millworks which generated the revenue and employment were often damaged or swept away by periodic flooding of the river leading to eventual abandonment of such projects. In particular, the spring flood of 1882 swept away a millrace, sawmill, and 30' x 50' three-story flour mill. In the 1890s, news spread that oil was in the ground after a resident discovered black soil that would burn. Although there was indeed some oil in the ground as verified by state geologists, it was not enough to expend resources to extract. The news of an "oil boom", however, was enough to attract a counterfeit gang which was eventually rounded up about a mile from town.

From 1900 to 1921, the Auburn Brick and Tile Works produced drain tile and building bricks using the clay pits at Grant City. The pits contained clay, sand, and gravel, which were transferred by conveyor cars on a system of wire cables suspended by tall wooden towers spanning the river valley for a distance of a quarter mile. The loads were transferred to Auburn by a small steam, or "dinky" engine on a narrow gauge railroad track. The quality of the finished product was not able to withstand the competition in the brick-building market and the expensive overhead costs led to the cessation of operations.

In 1904 the village incorporated officially as Grant City, a move which was motivated primarily to qualify for better school appropriations under Iowa law for the brick schoolhouse and related needs. The town experienced a general decline and by 1912, the post office had discontinued and just one store remained in business. The Masonic Lodge had relocated to Auburn leaving the Brotherhood of the American Yeomen as the only Order in town. The Methodist Episcopal church continued while the Seventh Day Adventist church was nearing its time of closure.

The town experienced a little lift during the Great War with strong farm product prices and by 1915, a short-lived automobile dealership was constructed on the east side of Main Street. The Iowa Census in 1915 reported 162 people in the town, 84 of which were adults.

In 1918, the Auburn Independent and Grant City Independent school districts consolidated, with no provision for transportation services between the two communities. Grant City children walked the mile or so to Auburn.

On the evening of May 3, 1919, at approximately 6:45pm, a tornado developed just south of the nearby town of Ulmer and moved east/northeasterly in a 200-ft wide path towards Grant City. Due to the slow forward-movement, residents had ample time to take cover. As the tornado passed through the town, large trees were uprooted and six houses were destroyed, leaving four others damaged. The 2nd story of the brick schoolhouse had blown off [see photo], and the Methodist Episcopal Church was completely swept away, with pieces scattered for miles. Wind speeds from the event were sufficient to move tombstones in the cemetery and damage a brick building on the east side of Main Street. Fortunately, no one was seriously injured as most had sought shelter in storm caves or cellars. Following the storm, many residents did not rebuild and left the community.

In 1926 during a contentious town meeting with taxpayers and nontaxpayers who were still qualified to vote, the citizens voted to discontinue the incorporation of Grant City. The population was 50 in 1940.

By 1949, Grant City consisted of two abandoned brick stores, a former schoolhouse, and a few scattered houses.
