= Auburn, Iowa =

- City
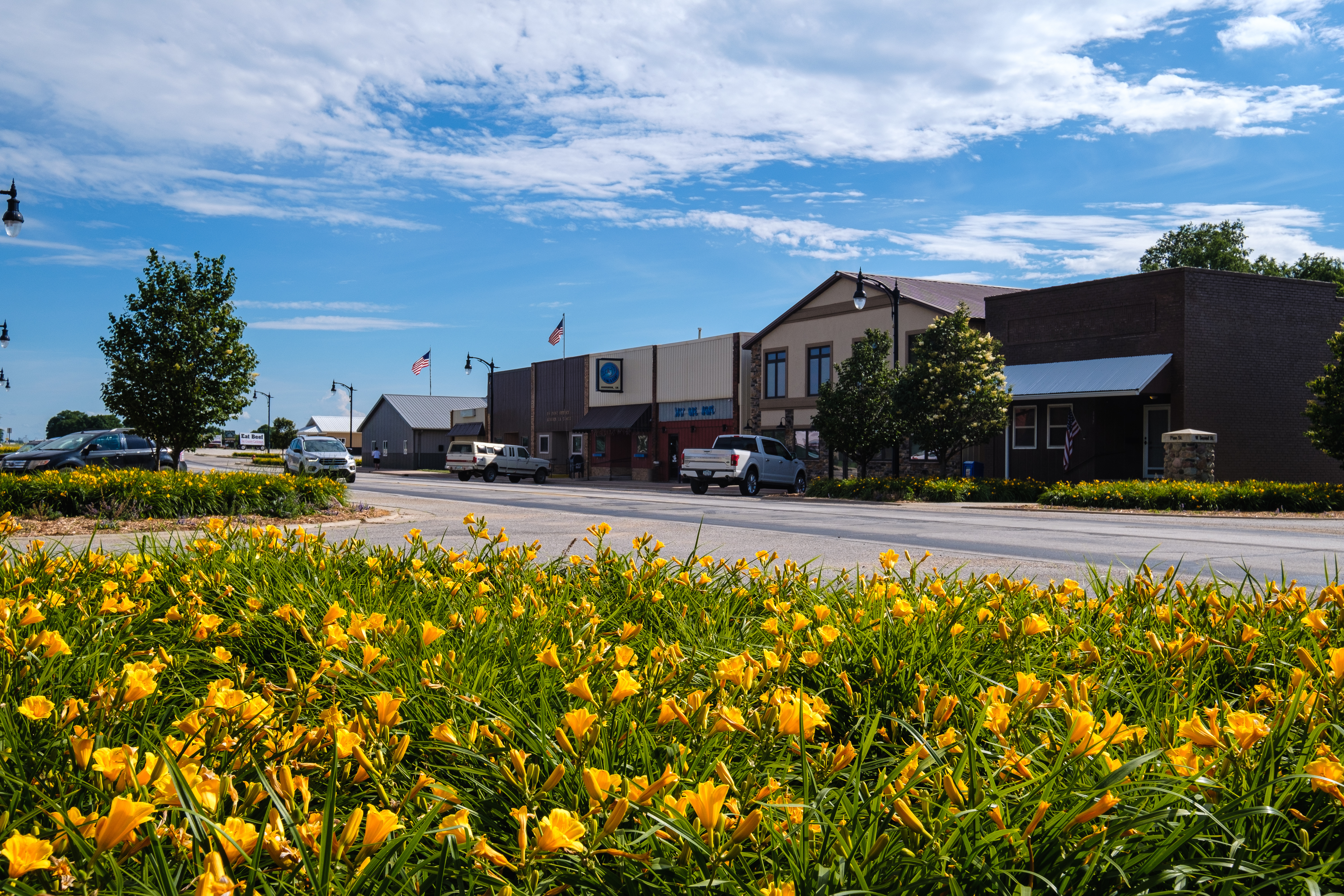
- Downtown Auburn
- Motto: A Taste of Home
- Location of Auburn, Iowa
- Coordinates: 42°14′56″N 94°52′35″W
- Country: USA
- State: Iowa
- County: Sac

Area
  - Total: 0.50 sq mi (1.29 km^{2})
  - Land: 0.50 sq mi (1.29 km^{2})
  - Water: 0 sq mi (0.00 km^{2})
- Elevation: 1,227 ft (374 m)

Population (2020)
  - Total: 265
  - Density: 533.3/sq mi (205.92/km^{2})
- Time zone: UTC-6 (Central (CST))
  - Summer (DST): UTC-5 (CDT)
- ZIP code: 51433
- Area code: 712
- FIPS code: 19-03610
- GNIS feature ID: 2394024
- Website: www.auburniowa.net

Auburn is a city in Sac County, Iowa, United States. The population was 265 at the 2020 census.

In 2014 Larry Finley, a former mayor of the town, stated in the Carroll Daily Times Herald that the Auburn community had embraced its financial identity as a "bedroom community."

== History ==
Auburn was platted in 1888. It was named after the city of Auburn, New York.

== Geography ==
According to the United States Census Bureau, the city has a total area of 0.50 square miles (1.29 km^{2}), all land.

Auburn is 15 miles (24 km) from Carroll, 15 miles (24 km) from Lake City, and 15 miles (24 km) from Lake View.

== Demographics ==
Historical populations
Year	Pop.	±%
1890	174	—
1900	293	+68.4%
1910	399	+36.2%
1920	406	+1.8%
1930	359	−11.6%
1940	383	+6.7%
1950	350	−8.6%
1960	367	+4.9%
1970	329	−10.4%
1980	320	−2.7%
1990	283	−11.6%
2000	296	+4.6%
2010	322	+8.8%
2020	265	−17.7%
Source:"U.S. Census website". United States Census Bureau. and Iowa Data Center; Source: U.S. Decennial Census

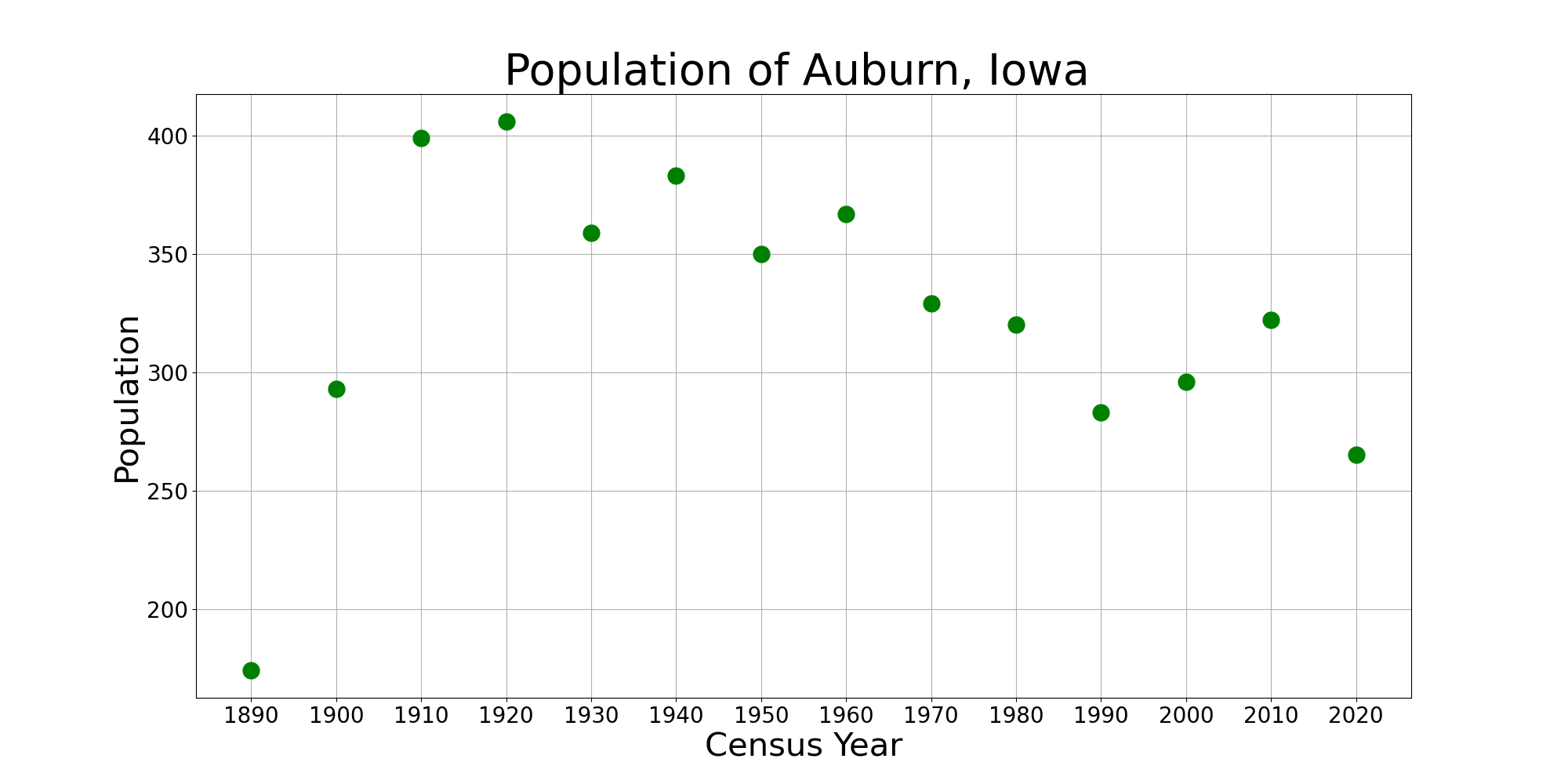
The population of Auburn, Iowa from US census data

=== 2020 census ===
As of the census of 2020, there were 265 people, 127 households, and 67 families residing in the city. The population density was 533.3 inhabitants per square mile (205.9/km^{2}). There were 139 housing units at an average density of 279.7 per square mile (108.0/km^{2}). The racial makeup of the city was 92.8% White, 0.4% Black or African American, 0.4% Native American, 0.4% Asian, 0.0% Pacific Islander, 1.5% from other races and 4.5% from two or more races. Hispanic or Latino persons of any race comprised 3.0% of the population.

Of the 127 households, 26.0% of which had children under the age of 18 living with them, 38.6% were married couples living together, 10.2% were cohabitating couples, 29.9% had a female householder with no spouse or partner present and 21.3% had a male householder with no spouse or partner present. 47.2% of all households were non-families. 37.0% of all households were made up of individuals, 13.4% had someone living alone who was 65 years old or older.

The median age in the city was 40.3 years. 23.8% of the residents were under the age of 20; 7.2% were between the ages of 20 and 24; 23.8% were from 25 and 44; 27.2% were from 45 and 64; and 18.1% were 65 years of age or older. The gender makeup of the city was 42.6% male and 57.4% female.

=== 2010 census ===
As of the census of 2010, there were 322 people, 127 households, and 90 families living in the city. The population density was 644.0 inhabitants per square mile (248.6/km^{2}). There were 146 housing units at an average density of 292.0 per square mile (112.7/km^{2}). The racial makeup of the city was 99.7% White and 0.3% Asian.

There were 127 households, of which 34.6% had children under the age of 18 living with them, 54.3% were married couples living together, 8.7% had a female householder with no husband present, 7.9% had a male householder with no wife present, and 29.1% were non-families. 26.8% of all households were made up of individuals, and 12.6% had someone living alone who was 65 years of age or older. The average household size was 2.54 and the average family size was 3.03.

The median age in the city was 36 years. 28.3% of residents were under the age of 18; 6.8% were between the ages of 18 and 24; 23.8% were from 25 to 44; 20.6% were from 45 to 64; and 20.5% were 65 years of age or older. The gender makeup of the city was 51.2% male and 48.8% female.

=== 2000 census ===
As of the census of 2000, there were 296 people, 132 households, and 79 families living in the city. The population density was 609.9 inhabitants per square mile (235.5/km^{2}). There were 142 housing units at an average density of 292.6 per square mile (113.0/km^{2}). The racial makeup of the city was 98.99% White, 0.34% Asian, and 0.68% from two or more races.

There were 132 households, out of which 25.0% had children under the age of 18 living with them, 47.0% were married couples living together, 10.6% had a female householder with no husband present, and 39.4% were non-families. 34.1% of all households were made up of individuals, and 20.5% had someone living alone who was 65 years of age or older. The average household size was 2.24 and the average family size was 2.85.

In the city, the population was spread out, with 23.3% under the age of 18, 9.8% from 18 to 24, 25.7% from 25 to 44, 17.9% from 45 to 64, and 23.3% who were 65 years of age or older. The median age was 38 years. For every 100 females, there were 102.7 males. For every 100 females age 18 and over, there were 97.4 males.

The median income for a household in the city was $42,500, and the median income for a family was $45,833. Males had a median income of $26,667 versus $21,042 for females. The per capita income for the city was $20,494. About 3.3% of families and 4.5% of the population were below the poverty line, including 6.8% of those under the age of eighteen and 5.9% of those 65 or over.

== Education ==
The city is served by the East Sac County Community School District.

It was previously a part of the Lake View-Auburn Community School District. The public school building in Auburn closed in 1987. The city government acquired the school building, converted it into a community center, and sold it since the price of heating was cost prohibitive. As of 2014 the former school is a private residence. On July 1, 1996, the Lake View-Auburn district merged into the Wall Lake View Auburn Community School District. That in turn merged into East Sac County on July 1, 2011.

Previously the town had a Catholic school. The water treatment company Krudico acquired it in 1990.

== Notable person ==
- Roy Reiman, magazine publisher
