= A. J. Schable =

American football player (born 1984)

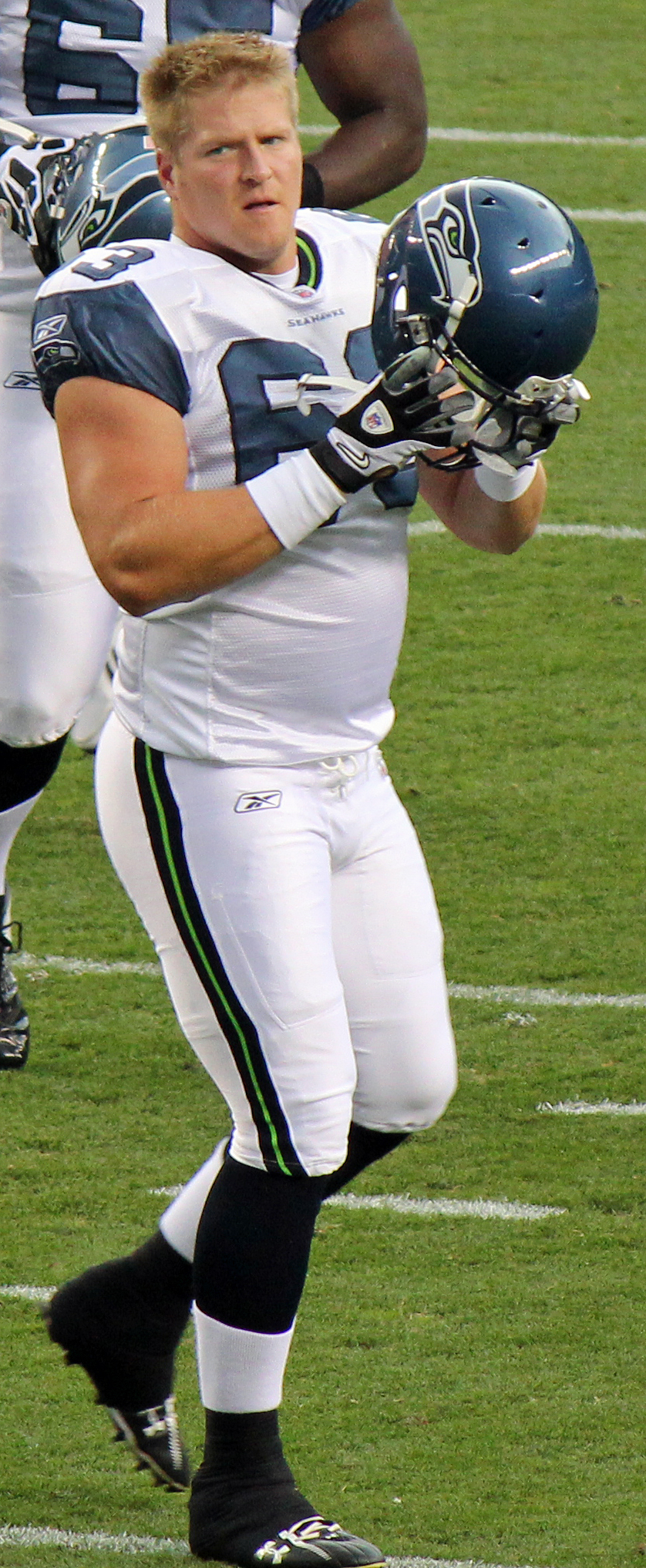
- Schable in the 2011 preseason

No. 96, 47, 91, 94
- Position: Defensive end

Personal information
- Born: May 18, 1984 (age 42); Ida Grove, Iowa, U.S.
- Listed height: 6 ft 4 in (1.93 m)
- Listed weight: 273 lb (124 kg)

Career information
- High school: Battle Creek-Ida Grove
- College: South Dakota (2002–2005)
- NFL draft: 2006: undrafted

Career history
- Arizona Cardinals (2006); Philadelphia Eagles (2008)*; New York Jets (2008)*; Sacramento Mountain Lions (2009–2011); Seattle Seahawks (2011)*
- * Offseason or practice squad member only

Career NFL statistics
- Total tackles: 10
- Fumble recoveries: 1
- Stats at Pro Football Reference

Andrew Joel "A. J." Schable (born May 18, 1984) is an American former professional football player who was a defensive end in the National Football League (NFL). He played college football for the South Dakota Coyotes and was signed by the Arizona Cardinals as an undrafted free agent in 2006. He is currently a firefighter in Sioux Falls, South Dakota.

Schable was also a member of the Philadelphia Eagles, New York Jets, and Sacramento Mountain Lions.

== Early life ==
Schable played high school football at Battle Creek-Ida Grove High School in Ida Grove, Iowa. He was a three sport letter winner in football, basketball, and track.

== Professional career ==
=== Seattle Seahawks ===
Schable signed a future contract with the Seattle Seahawks on January 20, 2011.
