= Carnarvon, Iowa =

- Unincorporated community
- Location within Iowa
- Coordinates: 42°15′13″N 95°01′18″W
- Country: United States
- State: Iowa
- County: Sac
- Elevation: 1,260 ft (380 m)
- Time zone: UTC-6 (Central (CST))
  - Summer (DST): UTC-5 (CDT)
- Area code: 712
- GNIS feature ID: 455175

Carnarvon is an unincorporated community in Sac County, in the U.S. state of Iowa. It shares its ZIP Code with the nearby city of Lake View.

== History ==
A post office was established at Carnarvon in 1888. The community was named after Caernarfon, in Wales, the former hometown of a first settler.

The population was 111 in 1940.

== Education ==
Carnarvon is a part of the East Sac County Community School District, which is headquartered in Lake View, which Carnarvon shares a ZIP code with. Before the district's legal founding in 2011, the community was a part of the Wall Lake-View Auburn Community School District.
