= Cooper DeJean =

American football player (born 2003)

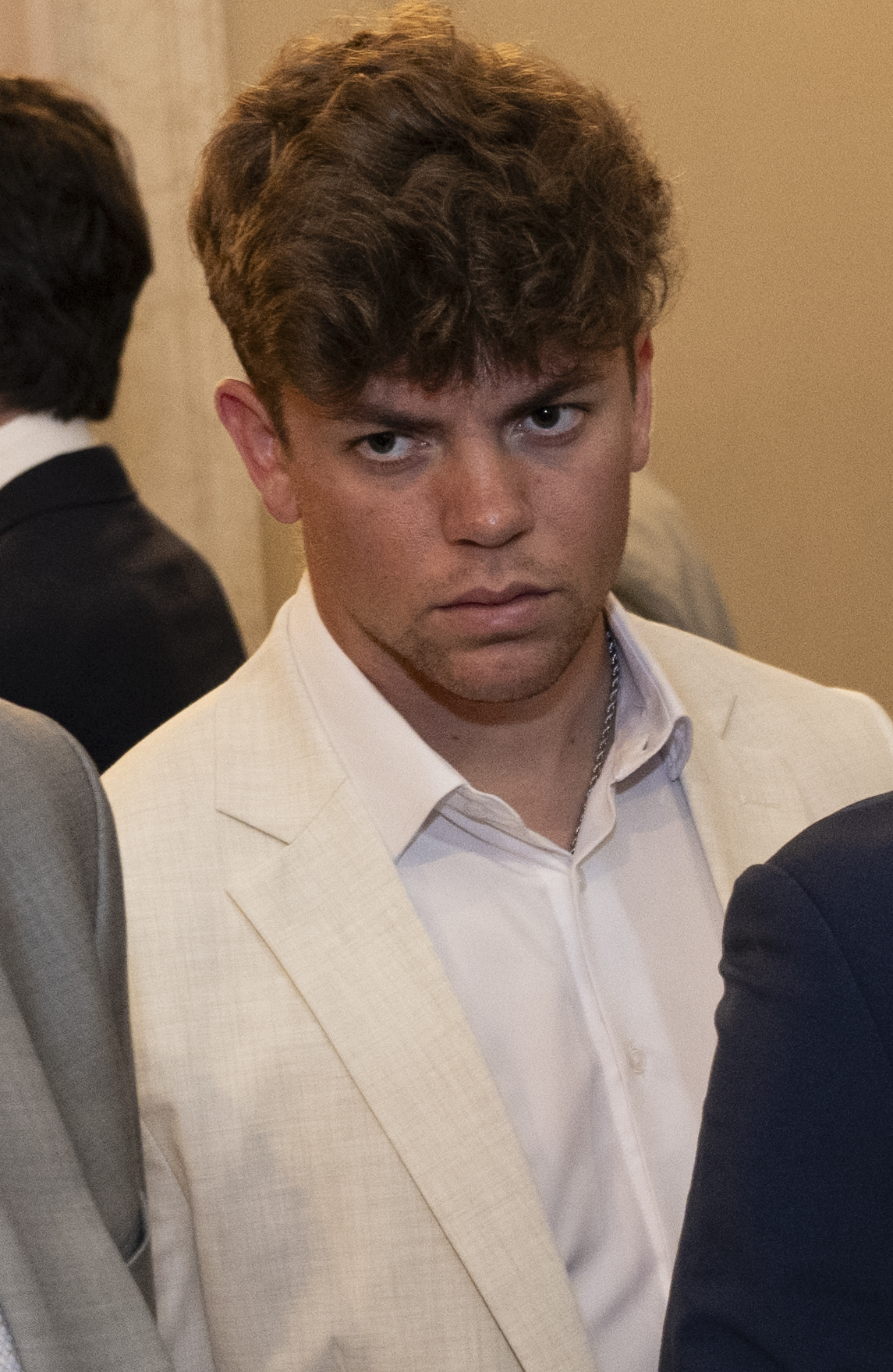
- DeJean in 2025

No. 33 – Philadelphia Eagles
- Position: Cornerback
- Roster status: Active

Personal information
- Born: February 9, 2003 (age 23); Sioux Falls, South Dakota, U.S.
- Listed height: 6 ft 0 in (1.83 m)
- Listed weight: 200 lb (91 kg)

Career information
- High school: OABCIG (Ida Grove, Iowa)
- College: Iowa (2021–2023)
- NFL draft: 2024: 2nd round, 40th overall pick

Career history
- Philadelphia Eagles (2024–present)

Awards and highlights
- Super Bowl champion (LIX); First-team All-Pro (2025) (Note: Selected as slot cornerback); Pro Bowl (2025); PFWA All-Rookie Team (2024); Unanimous All-American (2023); Big Ten Defensive Back of the Year (2023); Big Ten Return Specialist of the Year (2023); 2× First-team All-Big Ten (2022, 2023)

Career NFL statistics as of Week 9, 2026
- Total tackles: 196
- Sacks: 0.5
- Forced fumbles: 2
- Fumble recoveries: 3
- Pass deflections: 27
- Interceptions: 3
- Return yards: 211
- Stats at Pro Football Reference

Cooper Michael DeJean (born February 9, 2003) is an American professional football cornerback for the Philadelphia Eagles of the National Football League (NFL). He played college football for the Iowa Hawkeyes, receiving unanimous All-American honors in 2023. Selected by the Eagles in the second round of the 2024 NFL draft, DeJean helped the team win Super Bowl LIX as a rookie, where he returned his first career interception for a touchdown in the win.

== Early life ==
Cooper DeJean grew up in Odebolt, Iowa, a farming town of approximately 920 people, and attended OA-BCIG, a consolidated school in Ida Grove, Iowa. He played quarterback and cornerback in high school, and holds numerous school records. As a senior, he passed for 3,447 yards with 35 touchdowns, and rushed for 1,235 yards and 24 touchdowns. DeJean was the 2021 All-American Bowl Adidas Player of the Year.

In the 2020 Iowa state championship game, DeJean made several impactful plays, as OABCIG defeated Van Meter. Within a two-minute span, he blocked an extra point, scored the game-tying touchdown on a 4-yard run, and, following a Van Meter fumble on the ensuing kickoff, scored the go-ahead touchdown on a 19-yard run. The game was broadcast in local movie theaters and establishments across the four rural towns that feed into OABCIG High School (Odebolt, Arthur, Battle Creek, and Ida Grove).

In high school, DeJean played basketball and baseball and ran track. On the basketball court, he scored 1,832 career points, placing him just behind NFL tight end T.J. Hockenson—who played football at Iowa—and 55 points ahead of first-team Parade All-American and NBA player Harrison Barnes on the state's all-time scoring list. Additionally, his 218 career steals secured him a spot among the state's all-time leaders, eight ahead of McDonald's All-American Marcus Paige.

In track and field, DeJean recorded the fastest 100 meters of any runner in the state during his senior year and graduated with the sixth best long jump in state history (7.37 m (24 ft 2 in)).

Despite his athletic achievements and four-star recruit status, DeJean received limited scholarship offers coming out of high school. Ultimately, he chose to play defense at Iowa over playing quarterback at South Dakota State.

== College career ==
As a true freshman at Iowa in 2021, DeJean played in seven games, mostly on special teams, and had four tackles. He became a starter his sophomore year in 2022. DeJean played cornerback, cash (a hybrid linebacker/safety position), and punt returner for the Hawkeyes in 2022, in addition to playing safety in the preseason. Against Wisconsin, DeJean showcased his versatility, intercepting a Graham Mertz pass and returning it 32 yards for a touchdown, recording 10 tackles, forcing a fumble, downing a punt on the one-yard line, and returning four punts for 82 yards, setting up a short Iowa touchdown drive. Through three quarters, DeJean was out-gaining the Hawkeye offense. DeJean was named the MVP of the 2022 Music City Bowl after recording 7 tackles, a 14-yard interception return for a touchdown, and returning three punts for 42 yards. With three interceptions returned for a touchdown on the season, he co-led the NCAA with Emmanuel Forbes.

During the 2023 season, DeJean once again was a crucial part of Iowa's success. The Hawkeyes had a historically poor offense, but special teams and defense kept them in, and won them games. DeJean was not targeted as much, but registered three interceptions. He allowed only 22 receptions and no touchdowns during the season. DeJean was active in the return game, including the game-winning 70-yard return with three minutes left against Michigan State and a disallowed 54-yard return against rival Minnesota, which would have resulted in an Iowa lead. The referee's call of an invalid fair catch caused considerable controversy and prompted an explanatory conference call involving Big Ten and NCAA officiating personnel. DeJean suffered a leg injury in mid-November, sidelining him for the remainder of the season. Despite the setback, he was named unanimous consensus All-American and earned both the Tatum-Woodson Big Ten Defensive Back of the Year and Rodgers-Dwight Big Ten Return Specialist of the Year honors. He was also a finalist for the Bronko Nagurski Trophy and the Jim Thorpe Award.

DeJean declared for the 2024 NFL draft following the 2023 season. After the season, Iowa defensive coordinator and defensive backs coach Phil Parker remarked, "I didn't see Nile Kinnick play, but he might be the modern-day Nile Kinnick."

== Professional career ==
Pre-draft measurables
| Height | Weight | Arm length | Hand span | Wingspan | 40-yard dash | 10-yard split | 20-yard split | Vertical jump | Broad jump | Bench press |
|---|---|---|---|---|---|---|---|---|---|---|
| 6 ft 0 1/2 in (1.84 m) | 203 lb (92 kg) | 31 1/8 in (0.79 m) | 9 5/8 in (0.24 m) | 6 ft 2 7/8 in (1.90 m) | 4.42 s | 1.52 s | 2.58 s | 38.5 in (0.98 m) | 10 ft 4 in (3.15 m) | 16 reps |
All values from NFL Combine/Pro Day

=== 2024 season ===
DeJean was selected by the Philadelphia Eagles with the 40th overall pick of the 2024 NFL draft. He made his first career start in Week 6 of the 2024 season against the Cleveland Browns, at the nickelback position. He was named to the PFWA All-Rookie Team. He was graded as the number one corner in the league by Pro Football Focus (PFF) with a 86.3 grade.

DeJean recorded his first career interception in the second quarter of Super Bowl LIX off quarterback Patrick Mahomes, which was the first ever interception recorded by an Eagles player in a Super Bowl. DeJean returned the interception for a 38-yard touchdown, helping the Eagles defeat the Kansas City Chiefs 40–22 to capture the Super Bowl championship. The game was played on DeJean's 22nd birthday, making him the first player since fellow Eagle Steve Van Buren in 1947 to score a touchdown in a championship game on his birthday.

DeJean finished fourth in voting for the AP NFL Defensive Rookie of the Year award. He was ranked 60th by his fellow players on the NFL Top 100 Players of 2025.

=== 2025 season ===
In Week 16, DeJean recorded four tackles, four pass breakups, and an interception in a 29–18 win over the Washington Commanders, earning NFC Defensive Player of the Week.

== Career statistics ==
Legend
| | Won the Super Bowl |
| | Led the league |
| **Bold** | Career high |

=== NFL ===
==== Regular season ====
| Year | Team | Games | | Tackles | | | | | Interceptions | | | | | | Fumbles | | | | |
| Year | Team | GP | GS | Comb | Solo | Ast | Sck | TFL | PD | Int | Yds | Avg | Lng | TD | FF | Fum | FR | Yds | TD |
|---|---|---|---|---|---|---|---|---|---|---|---|---|---|---|---|---|---|---|---|
| 2024 | PHI | 16 | 9 | 51 | 38 | 13 | **0.5** | 3 | 6 | 0 | 0 | 0.0 | 0 | 0 | **1** | **2** | **3** | 0 | 0 |
| 2025 | PHI | 16 | 16 | **93** | **64** | **29** | 0.0 | **4** | **16** | **2** | **32** | 16.0 | 21 | 0 | **1** | 0 | 0 | 0 | 0 |
| 2026 | PHI | 9 | 9 | 52 | 30 | 22 | 0.0 | 5 | 5 | 1 | 25 | **25.0** | **25** | 0 | 0 | 0 | 0 | 0 | 0 |
| Career | | 36 | 29 | 196 | 132 | 64 | 0.5 | 12 | 27 | 3 | 57 | 19.0 | 25 | 0 | 2 | 2 | 3 | 0 | 0 |

==== Postseason ====
| Year | Team | Games | | Tackles | | | | | Interceptions | | | | | | Fumbles | | | | |
| Year | Team | GP | GS | Comb | Solo | Ast | Sck | TFL | PD | Int | Yds | Avg | Lng | TD | FF | Fum | FR | Yds | TD |
|---|---|---|---|---|---|---|---|---|---|---|---|---|---|---|---|---|---|---|---|
| 2024 | PHI | 4 | 4 | **18** | **12** | **6** | 0.0 | 0 | **4** | **1** | **38** | **38.0** | **38T** | **1** | 0 | **1** | **1** | 0 | 0 |
| 2025 | PHI | 1 | 1 | 2 | 1 | 1 | 0.0 | 0 | 2 | 0 | 0 | 0 | 0 | 0 | 0 | 0 | 0 | 0 | 0 |
| Career | | 5 | 5 | 20 | 13 | 7 | 0.0 | 0 | 6 | 1 | 38 | 38.0 | 38T | 1 | 0 | 1 | 1 | 0 | 0 |

=== College ===
Legend
| Co-led the NCAA |

| Year | Team | Games | | Tackles | | | | Fumbles | | | | Interceptions | | | | Punt returns | | | |
| Year | Team | GP | GS | Cmb | Solo | Ast | Sck | FF | FR | Yds | TD | Int | Yds | TD | PD | Ret | Yds | Avg | TD |
|---|---|---|---|---|---|---|---|---|---|---|---|---|---|---|---|---|---|---|---|
| 2021 | Iowa | 7 | 0 | 4 | 3 | 1 | 0.0 | 0 | 0 | 0 | 0 | 0 | 0 | 0 | 0 | — | — | — | — |
| 2022 | Iowa | 13 | 13 | **75** | **56** | **19** | 0.0 | 0 | 0 | 0 | 0 | **5** | **91** | **3** | **8** | 10 | 165 | **16.5** | 0 |
| 2023 | Iowa | 10 | 10 | 41 | 26 | 15 | 0.0 | 0 | 0 | 0 | 0 | 2 | 41 | 0 | 5 | **21** | **241** | 11.5 | **1** |
| Career | | 30 | 23 | 120 | 85 | 35 | 0.0 | 0 | 0 | 0 | 0 | 7 | 132 | 3 | 13 | 31 | 406 | 13.1 | 1 |

== Personal life ==
DeJean is the son of Jason and Katie DeJean. He is the eldest of three boys. The middle child, Beckett (20), plays defensive back for the University of South Dakota. The youngest child, Jaxx, who also plays football for OA-BCIG, is a 2027 3-star wide receiver committed to the University of Iowa. All three brothers are competitive and high achieving athletes. DeJean is a Christian.
