= Ulmer, Iowa =

- Unincorporated community
- Location within Iowa
- Coordinates: 42°16′04″N 94°57′00″W
- Country: United States
- State: Iowa
- County: Sac
- Elevation: 1,276 ft (389 m)
- Time zone: UTC-6 (Central (CST))
  - Summer (DST): UTC-5 (CDT)
- Area code: 712
- GNIS feature ID: 462414

Ulmer is an unincorporated community in Sac County, in the U.S. state of Iowa.

== Geography ==
The community is located on 360th Street one quarter mile east of its junction with U.S. Route 71.

== History ==
Ulmer was platted on November 21, 1900 by Carrie and W.T. Martin. The community was established on the Illinois Central Railroad.

A post office was established at Ulmer in 1901, alongside the Chicago Central and Pacific Railroad. The Farmers State Savings Bank of Ulmer was founded in 1911. Circa 1914, Ulmer was also the site of a dry goods and grocery store, a hardware and grocery store, a blacksmithing shop, a grain elevator, a lumber company, a stock dealer, an implement store, and a pool hall. The only church was the Presbyterian church.

In 1914, historian William H. Hart stated that Ulmer had made "a fine growth in its few years of existence." Ulmer's population was 127 in 1925, and was 53 in 1940.

== See also ==
- Carnarvon, Iowa
