= Viola Township, Sac County, Iowa =

Township in Sac County, Iowa, U.S.

Coordinates: 42°15′13″N 95°01′58″W

Viola Township is a township in Sac County, Iowa, United States.

The township's elevation is listed as 1293 feet above mean sea level.
