= Sac Community School District =

Former school district in Iowa

Sac Community School District was a school district headquartered in Sac City, Iowa. It had 98 square miles (250 km^{2}) of area.

It operated Sac Elementary School and Sac Junior-Senior High School.

== History ==
In 1876, the district was established.

In 2001, it had about 575 students.

In 2007, the Sac district and the Wall Lake View Auburn Community School District, prior to their legal merger, had established a grade-sharing program in which each district sent students to the other district for certain educational levels; it was under the name "East Sac Schools." Barb Kruthoff, the superintendent of the Walled Lake View district, became the shared superintendent of the two districts, and remained so up until 2010, just prior to the merger, so a new individual could become the superintendent of the legally combined school system. On July 1, 2011, the two districts legally merged into the East Sac County Community School District.
