= Odebolt, Iowa =

- City
- Motto: "Rich history proud community"
- Location of Odebolt, Iowa
- Coordinates: 42°18′42″N 95°15′05″W
- Country: USA
- State: Iowa
- County: Sac

Area
  - Total: 1.03 sq mi (2.67 km^{2})
  - Land: 1.03 sq mi (2.67 km^{2})
  - Water: 0 sq mi (0.00 km^{2})
- Elevation: 1,375 ft (419 m)

Population (2020)
  - Total: 994
  - Density: 962.8/sq mi (371.72/km^{2})
- Time zone: UTC-6 (Central (CST))
  - Summer (DST): UTC-5 (CDT)
- ZIP code: 51458
- Area code: 712
- FIPS code: 19-58575
- GNIS feature ID: 2395297
- Website: www.odebolt.net

Odebolt is a city in Sac County, Iowa, United States. The population was 994 at the time of the 2020 census.

== History ==
Odebolt was platted in 1877 when the Chicago & Northwestern Railway was extended to that point. Odebolt was incorporated as a city May 13, 1878.

While the etymology of Odebolt's unusual name is unquestioned—being named after the Odebolt Creek—the etymology of the creek's name is disputed. It has been ascribed to a story of a French fur trapper and to multiple stories of a bolt falling in the creek. The trapper's name was reportedly Odebeau, and his name corrupted.

== Geography ==
Odebolt Creek arises near Odebolt, flows through Ida Grove, then into the Maple River.

According to the United States Census Bureau, the city has a total area of 1.05 square miles (2.72 km^{2}), all land.

== Demographics ==
Historical populations
| Year | Pop. | ±% |
|---|---|---|
| 1880 | 637 | — |
| 1890 | 1,122 | +76.1% |
| 1900 | 1,432 | +27.6% |
| 1910 | 1,283 | −10.4% |
| 1920 | 1,445 | +12.6% |
| 1930 | 1,388 | −3.9% |
| 1940 | 1,350 | −2.7% |
| 1950 | 1,279 | −5.3% |
| 1960 | 1,331 | +4.1% |
| 1970 | 1,323 | −0.6% |
| 1980 | 1,299 | −1.8% |
| 1990 | 1,158 | −10.9% |
| 2000 | 1,153 | −0.4% |
| 2010 | 1,013 | −12.1% |
| 2020 | 994 | −1.9% |
Source:"U.S. Census website". United States Census Bureau. and Iowa Data Center; Source: U.S. Decennial Census

=== 2020 census ===
As of the census of 2020, there were 994 people, 424 households, and 277 families residing in the city. The population density was 962.8 inhabitants per square mile (371.7/km^{2}). There were 484 housing units at an average density of 468.8 per square mile (181.0/km^{2}). The racial makeup of the city was 96.6% White, 0.4% Black or African American, 0.2% Native American, 0.2% Asian, 0.1% Pacific Islander, 0.1% from other races and 2.4% from two or more races. Hispanic or Latino persons of any race comprised 1.6% of the population.

Of the 424 households, 27.4% of which had children under the age of 18 living with them, 50.5% were married couples living together, 6.1% were cohabitating couples, 23.6% had a female householder with no spouse or partner present and 19.8% had a male householder with no spouse or partner present. 34.7% of all households were non-families. 30.2% of all households were made up of individuals, 15.1% had someone living alone who was 65 years old or older.

The median age in the city was 46.1 years. 24.4% of the residents were under the age of 20; 3.2% were between the ages of 20 and 24; 21.3% were from 25 and 44; 26.0% were from 45 and 64; and 25.1% were 65 years of age or older. The gender makeup of the city was 50.8% male and 49.2% female.

=== 2010 census ===
As of the census of 2010, there were 1,013 people, 433 households, and 269 families living in the city. The population density was 964.8 inhabitants per square mile (372.5/km^{2}). There were 511 housing units at an average density of 486.7 per square mile (187.9/km^{2}). The racial makeup of the city was 98.5% White, 0.2% African American, 0.2% Native American, 0.1% Asian, 0.8% from other races, and 0.2% from two or more races. Hispanic or Latino of any race were 1.8% of the population.

There were 433 households, of which 26.3% had children under the age of 18 living with them, 52.9% were married couples living together, 6.0% had a female householder with no husband present, 3.2% had a male householder with no wife present, and 37.9% were non-families. 34.6% of all households were made up of individuals, and 20.1% had someone living alone who was 65 years of age or older. The average household size was 2.26 and the average family size was 2.89.

The median age in the city was 45 years. 23.6% of residents were under the age of 18; 5.8% were between the ages of 18 and 24; 20.5% were from 25 to 44; 26.2% were from 45 to 64; and 23.8% were 65 years of age or older. The gender makeup of the city was 47.8% male and 52.2% female.

=== 2000 census ===
As of the census of 2000, there were 1,153 people, 467 households, and 296 families living in the city. The population density was 1,102.7 inhabitants per square mile (425.8/km^{2}). There were 518 housing units at an average density of 495.4 per square mile (191.3/km^{2}). The racial makeup of the city was 99.22% white.

There were 467 households, out of which 27.4% had children under the age of 18 living with them, 56.1% were married couples living together, 5.4% had a female householder with no husband present, and 36.6% were non-families. 34.7% of all households were made up of individuals, and 23.1% had someone living alone who was 65 years of age or older. The average household size was 2.30 and the average family size was 2.99.

In the city, the population was spread out, with 23.4% under the age of 18, 4.9% from 18 to 24, 22.8% from 25 to 44, 18.8% from 45 to 64, and 30.0% who were 65 years of age or older. The median age was 44 years. For every 100 females, there were 87.5 males. For every 100 females age 18 and over, there were 82.4 males.

The median income for a household in the city was $30,208, and the median income for a family was $40,917. Males had a median income of $30,000 versus $18,438 for females. The per capita income for the city was $15,971. About 7.6% of families and 9.5% of the population were below the poverty line, including 14.9% of those under age 18 and 10.3% of those age 65 or over.

== Education ==
Odebolt is a part of the Odebolt–Arthur–Battle Creek–Ida Grove Community School District. It was a part of the Odebolt–Arthur Community School District, until its merger with the Battle Creek–Ida Grove Community School District on July 1, 2018. Schools serving the community include OABCIG Elementary Odebolt, OABCIG Middle School in Odebolt, and OABCIG High School in Ida Grove.

== Notable people ==
Cooper DeJean, NFL cornerback
