= Wheeler Township, Sac County, Iowa =

Township in Sac County, Iowa, U.S.

Coordinates: 42°15′15″N 95°15′54″W

Wheeler Township is a township in Sac County, Iowa, United States.

The township's elevation is listed as 1352 feet above mean sea level.
