= Cook Township, Sac County, Iowa =

Township in Sac County, Iowa, U.S.

Coordinates: 42°25′49″N 95°15′51″W

Cook Township is a township in Sac County, Iowa, United States.

The township's elevation is listed as 1394 feet above mean sea level.
