= Lytton, Iowa =

- City
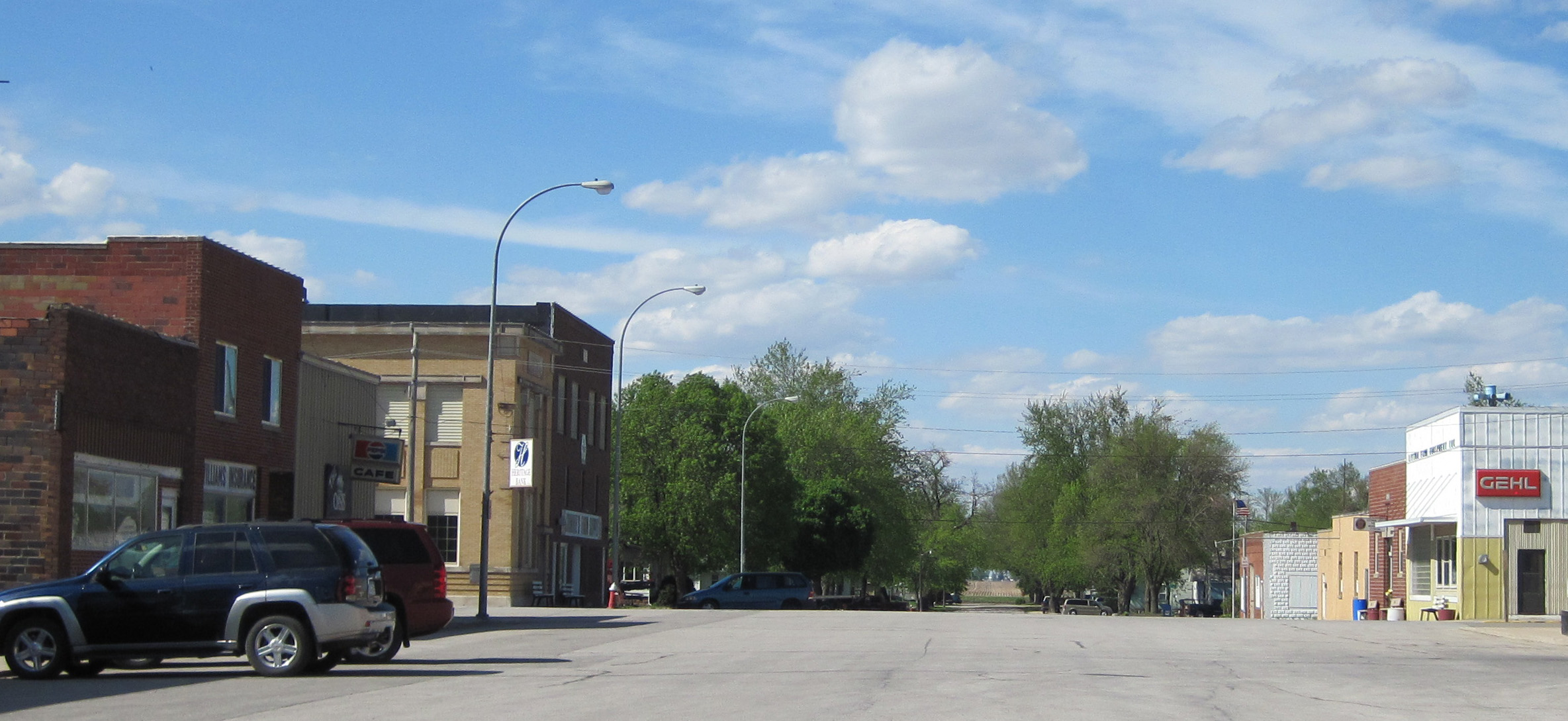
- Downtown Lytton
- Motto: The biggest little town for business in the state.
- Location of Lytton, Iowa
- Coordinates: 42°25′28″N 94°51′33″W
- Country: United States
- State: Iowa
- Counties: Sac, & partially in Calhoun

Area
  - Total: 0.23 sq mi (0.59 km^{2})
  - Land: 0.23 sq mi (0.59 km^{2})
  - Water: 0 sq mi (0.00 km^{2})
- Elevation: 1,227 ft (374 m)

Population (2020)
  - Total: 282
  - Density: 1,228.0/sq mi (474.15/km^{2})
- Time zone: UTC-6 (Central (CST))
  - Summer (DST): UTC-5 (CDT)
- ZIP code: 50561
- Area code: 712
- FIPS code: 19-47730
- GNIS feature ID: 0458704

Lytton is a city in Sac County and has grown into Calhoun County in the U.S. state of Iowa. The population was 282 at the time of the 2020 census.

== Geography ==
Lytton is located at 42°25′28″N 94°51′33″W (42.424360, -94.859129).

According to the United States Census Bureau, the city has a total area of 0.20 square miles (0.52 km^{2}), all land.

== History ==
Lytton was named for the English author Edward Bulwer-Lytton. The post office was established January 10, 1900. Iowa Supreme Court justice Daryl Hecht (1952–2019) was raised on a farm near Lytton.

== Demographics ==
Historical populations
Year	Pop.	±%
1920	278	—
1930	373	+34.2%
1940	335	−10.2%
1950	373	+11.3%
1960	376	+0.8%
1970	378	+0.5%
1980	377	−0.3%
1990	320	−15.1%
2000	305	−4.7%
2010	315	+3.3%
2020	282	−10.5%
Source:"U.S. Census website". United States Census Bureau. and Iowa Data Center; Source: U.S. Decennial Census

=== 2020 census ===
As of the census of 2020, there were 282 people, 119 households, and 74 families residing in the city. The population density was 1,228.0 inhabitants per square mile (474.1/km^{2}). There were 136 housing units at an average density of 592.2 per square mile (228.7/km^{2}). The racial makeup of the city was 94.3% White, 0.0% Black or African American, 0.0% Native American, 0.0% Asian, 0.4% Pacific Islander, 2.5% from other races and 2.8% from two or more races. Hispanic or Latino persons of any race comprised 3.2% of the population.

Of the 119 households, 37.0% of which had children under the age of 18 living with them, 45.4% were married couples living together, 5.9% were cohabitating couples, 21.8% had a female householder with no spouse or partner present and 26.9% had a male householder with no spouse or partner present. 37.8% of all households were non-families. 31.1% of all households were made up of individuals, 10.9% had someone living alone who was 65 years old or older.

The median age in the city was 35.5 years. 32.3% of the residents were under the age of 20; 2.5% were between the ages of 20 and 24; 25.2% were from 25 and 44; 24.8% were from 45 and 64; and 15.2% were 65 years of age or older. The gender makeup of the city was 52.8% male and 47.2% female.

=== 2010 census ===
As of the 2010 United States census, there were 315 people, 135 households, and 78 families residing in the city. The population density was 1,575.0 inhabitants per square mile (608.1/km^{2}). There were 147 housing units at an average density of 735.0 per square mile (283.8/km^{2}). The racial makeup of the city was 99.0% White, 0.3% from other races, and 0.6% from two or more races. Hispanic or Latino of any race were 2.2% of the population.

There were 135 households, of which 28.1% had children under the age of 18 living with them, 42.2% were married couples living together, 8.9% had a female householder with no husband present, 6.7% had a male householder with no wife present, and 42.2% were non-families. 34.1% of all households were made up of individuals, and 13.3% had someone living alone who was 65 years of age or older. The average household size was 2.33 and the average family size was 3.00.

The median age in the city was 39.4 years. 24.1% of residents were under the age of 18; 6.9% were between the ages of 18 and 24; 26.3% were from 25 to 44; 27% were from 45 to 64; and 15.6% were 65 years of age or older. The gender makeup of the city was 50.5% male and 49.5% female.

== Education ==
Lytton is within the South Central Calhoun Community School District.

It was a part of the Lytton Community School District until July 1, 1993, when it merged into the Rockwell City–Lytton Community School District. That in turn merged into South Central Calhoun on July 1, 2014.
