= Delaware Township, Sac County, Iowa =

Township in Sac County, Iowa, U.S.

Coordinates: 42°31′04″N 95°05′30″W

Delaware Township is a township in Sac County, Iowa, United States. Nemaha is contained within Delaware Township.

== Geography ==
The township's elevation is listed as 1316 feet above mean sea level. It has a total area of 36.04 square miles.

== Demographics ==
As of the 2010 census, Delaware Township had a population of 275 and 127 housing units.

== History ==
Delaware Township was founded in 1876 and was previously a part of Douglas Township. Its first settlers was Truman Tole, a homesteader, who arrived in 1866. The Chicago, Milwaukee, St. Paul and Pacific Railroad ran through Delaware Township. The first churches to be organized were Presbyterian. Delaware Township had the first Union Township School in the county, established in Nemaha in 1914.

== Education ==
Delaware Township is part of the Galva–Holstein Community School District.
