= Nemaha, Iowa =

- City
- Motto: A Mighty Small Town
- Location of Nemaha, Iowa

- Location within Iowa Location within the United States
- Coordinates: 42°30′53″N 95°05′19″W
- Country: United States
- State: Iowa
- County: Sac
- Township: Delaware

Area
  - Total: 0.085 sq mi (0.22 km^{2})
  - Land: 0.085 sq mi (0.22 km^{2})
  - Water: 0 sq mi (0.00 km^{2})
- Elevation: 1,326 ft (404 m)

Population (2020)
  - Total: 66
  - Density: 782.8/sq mi (302.25/km^{2})
- Time zone: UTC-6 (Central (CST))
  - Summer (DST): UTC-5 (CDT)
- ZIP code: 50567
- Area code: 712
- FIPS code: 19-55515
- GNIS feature ID: 2395169

Nemaha is a city in Sac County, Iowa, United States. The population was 66 at the time of the 2020 census.

== Geography ==
According to the United States Census Bureau, the city has a total area of 0.07 square miles (0.18 km^{2}), all land.

== Demographics ==
Historical populations
Year	Pop.	±%
1920	166	—
1930	146	−12.0%
1940	169	+15.8%
1950	184	+8.9%
1960	151	−17.9%
1970	117	−22.5%
1980	120	+2.6%
1990	112	−6.7%
2000	102	−8.9%
2010	85	−16.7%
2020	66	−22.4%
Source:"U.S. Census website". United States Census Bureau. and Iowa Data Center; Source: U.S. Decennial Census

=== 2020 census ===
As of the census of 2020, there were 66 people, 29 households, and 20 families residing in the city. The population density was 782.8 inhabitants per square mile (302.3/km^{2}). There were 34 housing units at an average density of 403.3 per square mile (155.7/km^{2}). The racial makeup of the city was 86.4% White, 1.5% Black or African American, 0.0% Native American, 1.5% Asian, 0.0% Pacific Islander, 1.5% from other races and 9.1% from two or more races. Hispanic or Latino persons of any race comprised 10.6% of the population.

Of the 29 households, 20.7% of which had children under the age of 18 living with them, 51.7% were married couples living together, 6.9% were cohabitating couples, 17.2% had a female householder with no spouse or partner present and 24.1% had a male householder with no spouse or partner present. 31.0% of all households were non-families. 31.0% of all households were made up of individuals, 6.9% had someone living alone who was 65 years old or older.

The median age in the city was 51.3 years. 28.8% of the residents were under the age of 20; 1.5% were between the ages of 20 and 24; 18.2% were from 25 and 44; 28.8% were from 45 and 64; and 22.7% were 65 years of age or older. The gender makeup of the city was 53.0% male and 47.0% female.

=== 2010 census ===
As of the census of 2010, there were 85 people, 33 households, and 23 families living in the city. The population density was 1,214.3 inhabitants per square mile (468.8/km^{2}). There were 36 housing units at an average density of 514.3 per square mile (198.6/km^{2}). The racial makeup of the city was 88.2% White, 3.5% African American, 1.2% Asian, and 7.1% from other races. Hispanic or Latino of any race were 12.9% of the population.

There were 33 households, of which 30.3% had children under the age of 18 living with them, 54.5% were married couples living together, 9.1% had a female householder with no husband present, 6.1% had a male householder with no wife present, and 30.3% were non-families. 24.2% of all households were made up of individuals, and 6% had someone living alone who was 65 years of age or older. The average household size was 2.58 and the average family size was 3.13.

The median age in the city was 39.5 years. 29.4% of residents were under the age of 18; 5.8% were between the ages of 18 and 24; 24.7% were from 25 to 44; 28.3% were from 45 to 64; and 11.8% were 65 years of age or older. The gender makeup of the city was 56.5% male and 43.5% female.

=== 2000 census ===
As of the census of 2000, there were 102 people, 42 households, and 25 families living in the city. The population density was 637.4 inhabitants per square mile (246.1/km^{2}). There were 44 housing units at an average density of 275.0 per square mile (106.2/km^{2}). The racial makeup of the city was 97.06% White, 0.98% Native American, and 1.96% from two or more races.

There were 42 households, out of which 35.7% had children under the age of 18 living with them, 54.8% were married couples living together, 4.8% had a female householder with no husband present, and 38.1% were non-families. 28.6% of all households were made up of individuals, and 9.5% had someone living alone who was 65 years of age or older. The average household size was 2.43 and the average family size was 3.08.

In the city, the population was spread out, with 26.5% under the age of 18, 7.8% from 18 to 24, 27.5% from 25 to 44, 24.5% from 45 to 64, and 13.7% who were 65 years of age or older. The median age was 38 years. For every 100 females, there were 131.8 males. For every 100 females age 18 and over, there were 120.6 males.

The median income for a household in the city was $27,708, and the median income for a family was $31,250. Males had a median income of $21,250 versus $28,125 for females. The per capita income for the city was $11,997. There were 8.3% of families and 9.5% of the population living below the poverty line, including no under eighteens and none of those over 64.

== Education ==
Nemaha is a part of the Schaller-Crestland Community School District. This district cooperates with the Galva-Holstein Community School District, and the two have the collective name "Ridge View Community School District".

A school in the Nemaha area was established as the Delaware Central School in the decade of the 1900s. Replacement buildings came in 1913, and then in 1923. Before the merger with Crestland in 1958, Nemaha was an independent school district. They were known as the Blue Jays. The school districts of Nemaha and Early combined into one district in 1958. The Nemaha elementary school closed in 1989, and elementary students were moved to the school in Schaller. In November 1990, the Nemaha School facility had been razed.

The Schaller-Crestland district formed on July 1, 1993, by the merger of the Schaller Community School District and the Crestland Community School District. Circa 2010, Schaller-Crestland began grade sharing with Galva-Holstein.
