= Coon Valley Township, Sac County, Iowa =

Township in Sac County, Iowa, US

Coordinates: 42°20′27″N 94°54′57″W

Coon Valley Township is a township in Sac County, Iowa, United States.

The township's elevation is listed as 1207 feet above mean sea level.

== History ==
Coon Valley Township was established in 1877. Its name comes from the fact that the Raccoon River flows through it.

== Demographics ==
As of 2010, Coon Valley Township had 187 residents and 92 housing units.
