= Sac Township, Sac County, Iowa =

Township in Sac County, Iowa, U.S.

Coordinates: 42°15′11″N 94°55′00″W

Sac Township is a township in Sac County, Iowa, United States.

The township's elevation is listed as 1257 feet above mean sea level.
