= Wall Lake Depot =

- Chicago and North Western Passenger Depot
- U.S. National Register of Historic Places
- Location within Iowa Location within the United States
- Location: 3727 Perkins Ave. Wall Lake, Iowa
- Coordinates: 42°16′13″N 95°5′23″W
- Area: less than one acre
- Built: 1899
- Built by: A.H. Carter & Co.
- NRHP reference No.: 03000358
- Added to NRHP: May 9, 2003

Wall Lake is a historic station building located in Wall Lake, Iowa, United States. Wall Lake was served by both the Chicago & North Western Railroad and the Illinois Central Railroad, which gave it a significant rail presence from the 1880s until World War II. The C&NW depot is an example of a combination station plan. The plan combined both passenger and freight services in one building. They were commonly used during the heyday of railroad growth round the turn of the 20th century. However, the old Wall Lake C&NW depot was moved and used for freight. What would have been the freight room was used here for a lunchroom. C&NW had three standard combination depot plans that have been attributed to the prominent Chicago architectural firm of Frost & Granger. The Wall Lake depot was the largest of the three as it incorporated a women's waiting room, but it was actually 9 feet (2.7 m) shorter than the general plan because freight was processed in another facility. The depot was built in 1899 by A.H. Carter & Co. of Cedar Rapids, Iowa as a replacement depot. The single-story frame structure is the only building used as a depot that remains in town. It was listed on the National Register of Historic Places in 2003.

Preceding station	Chicago and North Western Railway	Following station
Herring toward Mondamin	Mondamin – Wall Lake	Terminus
Odebolt toward Onawa	Onawa – Wall Lake	Terminus
Terminus	Wall Lake – Tama	Carnarvon toward Tama
Lake View toward Sioux City	Sioux City – Carroll	Carnarvon toward Carroll
Preceding station	Illinois Central Railroad	Following station
Denison toward Omaha	Omaha – Fort Dodge	Yetter toward Fort Dodge
