= Rockwell City–Lytton Community School District =

Former school district in Iowa, United States

Rockwell City–Lytton Community School District was a school district headquartered in Rockwell City, Iowa.

In addition to Rockwell City it served Lytton and Jolley.

== History ==
The district formed on July 1, 1993, from the merger of the Rockwell City Community School District and the Lytton Community School District.

In 1998, the district had 612 students; this declined by 24% to 467 in 2011.

In 2009, the Rockwell City–Lytton district and the Southern Cal Community School District decided to begin sharing athletic programs in the 2010–2011 school year and begin whole grade sharing, in which districts sent students to each other's schools, in the 2012–2013 school year. By 2011–2013, grades 5–12 were shared, and in 2012–2013 all grade levels became shared. On Tuesday, February 5, 2013, the districts held an election on whether they would consolidate. The vote to consolidate was successful, with a 253–67 count in Rockwell City–Lytton and 340–86 in Southern Calhoun; a total of 746 people voted. On July 1, 2014, the two districts merged to form the South Central Calhoun Community School District.

== Schools ==
Its schools included Rockwell City–Lytton Elementary School in Rockwell City, Rockwell City–Lytton Middle School in Lytton, and Rockwell City–Lytton High School in Rockwell City.

In 2009, the district closed the middle school and later sold it for $10,000 to a private individual.
