= Richland Township, Sac County, Iowa =

Township in Sac County, Iowa, U.S.

Coordinates: 42°20′30″N 95°15′52″W

Richland Township is a township in Sac County, Iowa, United States.

The township's elevation is listed as 1411 feet above mean sea level.
