= Wall Lake, Iowa =

- City
- Motto: City of Energy
- Location of Wall Lake, Iowa
- Coordinates: 42°16′02″N 95°05′36″W
- Country: United States
- State: Iowa
- County: Sac

Area
  - Total: 1.15 sq mi (2.97 km^{2})
  - Land: 1.15 sq mi (2.97 km^{2})
  - Water: 0 sq mi (0.00 km^{2})
- Elevation: 1,227 ft (374 m)

Population (2020)
  - Total: 755
  - Density: 659.1/sq mi (254.48/km^{2})
- Time zone: UTC-6 (Central (CST))
  - Summer (DST): UTC-5 (CDT)
- ZIP code: 51466
- Area code: 712
- FIPS code: 19-82020
- GNIS feature ID: 2397177
- Website: http://www.walllake.com

Wall Lake is a city in Sac County, Iowa, United States. The population was 755 at the time of the 2020 census.

== History ==
Wall Lake was platted in 1877. The city took its name from nearby Wall Lake.

== Geography ==
According to the United States Census Bureau, the city has a total area of 1.23 square miles (3.19 km^{2}), all land.

== Demographics ==
Historical populations
Year	Pop.	±%
1880	208	—
1890	439	+111.1%
1900	659	+50.1%
1910	561	−14.9%
1920	737	+31.4%
1930	749	+1.6%
1940	762	+1.7%
1950	753	−1.2%
1960	812	+7.8%
1970	936	+15.3%
1980	892	−4.7%
1990	875	−1.9%
2000	841	−3.9%
2010	819	−2.6%
2020	755	−7.8%
Source:"U.S. Census website". United States Census Bureau. and Iowa Data Center; Source: U.S. Decennial Census

=== 2020 census ===
As of the census of 2020, there were 755 people, 325 households, and 186 families residing in the city. The population density was 659.1 inhabitants per square mile (254.5/km^{2}). There were 354 housing units at an average density of 309.0 per square mile (119.3/km^{2}). The racial makeup of the city was 96.7% White, 0.1% Black or African American, 0.0% Native American, 0.0% Asian, 0.1% Pacific Islander, 0.9% from other races and 2.1% from two or more races. Hispanic or Latino persons of any race comprised 1.6% of the population.

Of the 325 households, 23.7% of which had children under the age of 18 living with them, 42.8% were married couples living together, 4.9% were cohabitating couples, 29.2% had a female householder with no spouse or partner present and 23.1% had a male householder with no spouse or partner present. 42.8% of all households were non-families. 37.5% of all households were made up of individuals, 21.2% had someone living alone who was 65 years old or older.

The median age in the city was 47.4 years. 24.9% of the residents were under the age of 20; 3.6% were between the ages of 20 and 24; 19.1% were from 25 and 44; 22.9% were from 45 and 64; and 29.5% were 65 years of age or older. The gender makeup of the city was 48.2% male and 51.8% female.

=== 2010 census ===
As of the census of 2010, there were 819 people, 335 households, and 217 families living in the city. The population density was 665.9 inhabitants per square mile (257.1/km^{2}). There were 366 housing units at an average density of 297.6 per square mile (114.9/km^{2}). The racial makeup of the city was 99.8% White, 0.1% Asian, and 0.1% from two or more races. Hispanic or Latino of any race were 0.1% of the population.

There were 336 households, of which 26.9% had children under the age of 18 living with them, 54.9% were married couples living together, 7.2% had a female householder with no husband present, 2.7% had a male householder with no wife present, and 35.2% were non-families. 32.8% of all households were made up of individuals, and 17.3% had someone living alone who was 65 years of age or older. The average household size was 2.25 and the average family size was 2.84.

The median age in the city was 49.3 years. 22.3% of residents were under the age of 18; 3.9% were between the ages of 18 and 24; 20.1% were from 25 to 44; 25.2% were from 45 to 64; and 28.6% were 65 years of age or older. The gender makeup of the city was 45.9% male and 54.1% female.

=== 2000 census ===
As of the census of 2000, there were 841 people, 322 households, and 216 families living in the city. The population density was 776.2 inhabitants per square mile (299.7/km^{2}). There were 338 housing units at an average density of 311.9 per square mile (120.4/km^{2}). The racial makeup of the city was 98.22% White, 0.12% African American, 0.12% Native American, 0.12% Asian, and 1.43% from two or more races. Hispanic or Latino of any race were 0.12% of the population.

There were 326 households, out of which 30.4% had children under the age of 18 living with them, 57.1% were married couples living together, 6.8% had a female householder with no husband present, and 32.9% were non-families. 30.1% of all households were made up of individuals, and 20.2% had someone living alone who was 65 years of age or older. The average household size was 2.40 and the average family size was 3.00.

Age spread: 23.9% under the age of 18, 8.4% from 18 to 24, 21.6% from 25 to 44, 20.2% from 45 to 64, and 25.8% who were 65 years of age or older. The median age was 42 years. For every 100 females, there were 92.0 males. For every 100 females age 18 and over, there were 82.9 males.

The median income for a household in the city was $33,125, and the median income for a family was $38,750. Males had a median income of $27,386 versus $19,375 for females. The per capita income for the city was $15,390. About 7.2% of families and 11.0% of the population were below the poverty line, including 15.8% of those under age 18 and 8.3% of those age 65 or over.

== Education ==
The city is served by the East Sac County Community School District. It was a part of the Wall Lake Community School District until July 1, 1996, when it merged into the Wall Lake View Auburn School District. That in turn merged into East Sac County on July 1, 2011.

== Notable people ==
- Adam Williams, actor and Navy Cross recipient in World War II.
- Andy Williams, singer, was born in Wall Lake in 1927.
- The Williams Brothers - Singing quartet. All four brothers (Bob, Don, Dick and Andy were born in Wall Lake.

== See also ==
- Chicago and North Western Passenger Depot, listed on the National Register of Historic Places
