= Herring, Iowa =

- ghost town
- Location within Iowa Location within the United States
- Coordinates: 42.2319°N 95.1642°W
- Country: United States
- State: Iowa
- County: Sac
- Elevation: 1,276 ft (389 m)
- Time zone: UTC-6 (Central (CST))
  - Summer (DST): UTC-5 (CDT)
- Area code: 712
- GNIS feature ID: 1982893

Herring is a ghost town in Sac County, in the U.S. state of Iowa.

== History ==
Herring was originally called Weed, and under the latter name was platted in 1899. The community was platted by the Western Town Lot Company.

The community was renamed Herring in 1901, in honor of a local pioneer settler. A post office was established at Herring in 1900, and remained in operation until it was discontinued in 1951.

Herring's population was 35 in 1940.
