= Wall Lake Township, Sac County, Iowa =

Township in Sac County, Iowa, U.S.

Coordinates: 42°20′28″N 95°01′55″W

Wall Lake Township is a township in Sac County, Iowa, United States.

The township's elevation is listed as 1283 feet above mean sea level.
