= Lake View, Iowa =

- City
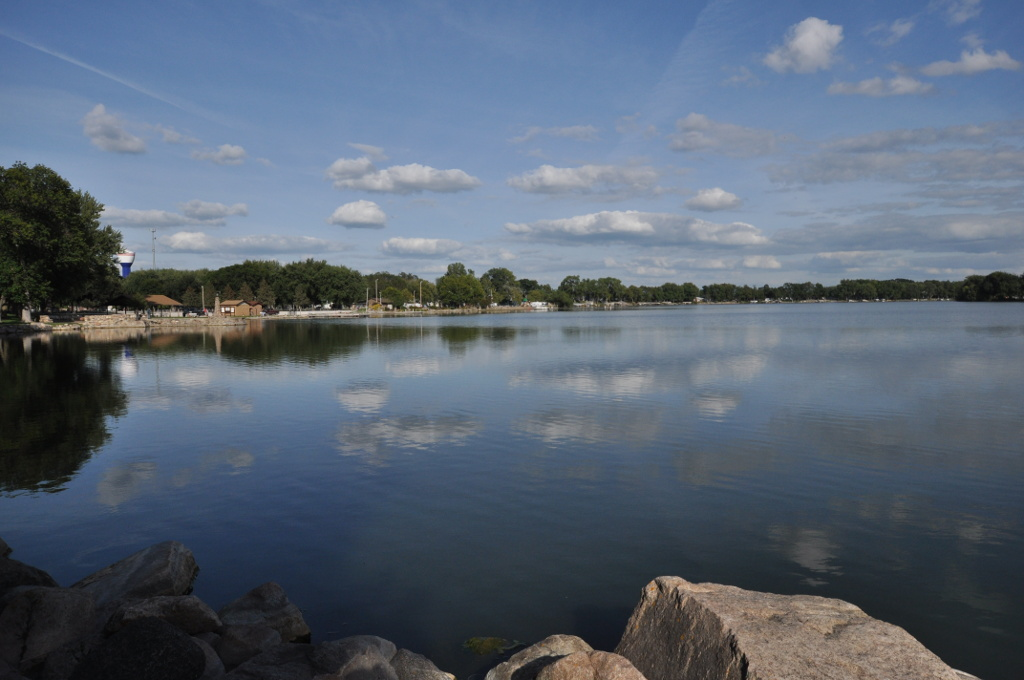
- Lakeside Park Historic District, Lake View
- Motto: "It's a lifestyle"
- Location of Lake View, Iowa
- Coordinates: 42°18′17″N 95°02′28″W
- Country: USA
- State: Iowa
- County: Sac

Area
  - Total: 2.37 sq mi (6.13 km^{2})
  - Land: 2.08 sq mi (5.38 km^{2})
  - Water: 0.29 sq mi (0.75 km^{2})
- Elevation: 1,221 ft (372 m)

Population (2020)
  - Total: 1,113
  - Density: 535.6/sq mi (206.81/km^{2})
- Time zone: UTC-6 (Central (CST))
  - Summer (DST): UTC-5 (CDT)
- ZIP code: 51450
- Area code: 712
- FIPS code: 19-42690
- GNIS feature ID: 2395604
- Website: City of Lake View

Lake View is a city in Sac County, Iowa, United States. The population was 1,113 in the 2020 census, a decline from the 1,278 population in 2000.

== History ==
The area around what is today called Black Hawk Lake was settled by white settlers in 1867. The first settlement was built by Robert Throssel and his son, followed by Joseph Parkinson, Noah Borah, William Johnston, Thomas Waddicor and George Trainer. In 1880 Platt Armstrong and James Fletcher built a railway station for the North Western Railway Company and laid out the town of Fletcher. The town was incorporated as a city and the name was changed from Fletcher to Lake View in 1887. The present name was selected for the scenic view over Wall Lake.

== Geography ==
According to the United States Census Bureau, the city has a total area of 2.42 square miles (6.27 km^{2}), of which 2.12 square miles (5.49 km^{2}) is land and 0.30 square miles (0.78 km^{2}) is water.

== Demographics ==
Historical population
Census	Pop.	Note	%±
1890	366		—
1900	591		61.5%
1910	514		−13.0%
1920	838		63.0%
1930	993		18.5%
1940	1,082		9.0%
1950	1,158		7.0%
1960	1,165		0.6%
1970	1,249		7.2%
1980	1,291		3.4%
1990	1,303		0.9%
2000	1,278		−1.9%
2010	1,142		−10.6%
2020	1,113		−2.5%
U.S. Decennial Census

=== 2020 census ===
As of the 2020 census, Lake View had a population of 1,113 people, including 549 households and 312 families. The population density was 535.6 inhabitants per square mile (206.8/km^{2}). There were 868 housing units at an average density of 417.7 per square mile (161.3/km^{2}).

The median age was 58.9 years. 15.0% of residents were under the age of 18 and 36.7% of residents were 65 years of age or older. For every 100 females there were 87.1 males, and for every 100 females age 18 and over there were 86.2 males age 18 and over.

0.0% of residents lived in urban areas, while 100.0% lived in rural areas.

There were 549 households, of which 15.3% had children under the age of 18 living in them. Of all households, 47.5% were married-couple households, 17.1% were households with a male householder and no spouse or partner present, and 28.6% were households with a female householder and no spouse or partner present. About 43.2% of households were non-families, 36.6% of all households were made up of individuals, and 22.2% had someone living alone who was 65 years of age or older.

There were 868 housing units, of which 36.8% were vacant. The homeowner vacancy rate was 3.8% and the rental vacancy rate was 17.4%.

Racial composition as of the 2020 census
Race	Number	Percent
White	1,088	97.8%
Black or African American	1	0.1%
American Indian and Alaska Native	0	0.0%
Asian	0	0.0%
Native Hawaiian and Other Pacific Islander	1	0.1%
Some other race	5	0.4%
Two or more races	18	1.6%
Hispanic or Latino (of any race)	16	1.4%

=== 2010 census ===
As of the census of 2010, there were 1,142 people, 564 households, and 326 families residing in the city. The population density was 538.7 inhabitants per square mile (208.0/km^{2}). There were 950 housing units at an average density of 448.1 per square mile (173.0/km^{2}). The racial makeup of the city was 99.3% White, 0.3% African American, 0.1% Pacific Islander, and 0.4% from two or more races. Hispanic or Latino of any race were 0.1% of the population.

There were 564 households, of which 17.7% had children under the age of 18 living with them, 48.2% were married couples living together, 6.2% had a female householder with no husband present, 3.4% had a male householder with no wife present, and 42.2% were non-families. 38.8% of all households were made up of individuals, and 20.9% had someone living alone who was 65 years of age or older. The average household size was 1.95 and the average family size was 2.54.

The median age in the city was 54.3 years. 16.1% of residents were under the age of 18; 3.5% were between the ages of 18 and 24; 16.7% were from 25 to 44; 33.3% were from 45 to 64; and 30.5% were 65 years of age or older. The gender makeup of the city was 47.2% male and 52.8% female.

=== 2000 census ===
As of the census of 2000, there were 1,278 people, 571 households, and 360 families residing in the city. The population density was 696.4 inhabitants per square mile (268.9/km^{2}). There were 818 housing units at an average density of 445.8 per square mile (172.1/km^{2}). The racial makeup of the city was 99.06% White, 0.39% African American, 0.08% Native American, and 0.47% from two or more races. Hispanic or Latino of any race were 0.23% of the population.

There were 571 households, out of which 22.9% had children under the age of 18 living with them, 54.6% were married couples living together, 7.4% had a female householder with no husband present, and 36.8% were non-families. 33.1% of all households were made up of individuals, and 19.1% had someone living alone who was 65 years of age or older. The average household size was 2.18 and the average family size was 2.75.

In the city, the population was spread out, with 20.7% under the age of 18, 4.4% from 18 to 24, 19.7% from 25 to 44, 26.5% from 45 to 64, and 28.7% who were 65 years of age or older. The median age was 48 years. For every 100 females, there were 87.9 males. For every 100 females age 18 and over, there were 81.1 males.

The median income for a household in the city was $26,691, and the median income for a family was $33,333. Males had a median income of $26,932 versus $19,773 for females. The per capita income for the city was $15,857. About 9.5% of families and 13.3% of the population were below the poverty line, including 24.0% of those under age 18 and 8.5% of those age 65 or over.

== Parks and recreation ==
The Sauk Rail Trail is a 33-mile trail running between the Black Hawk Lake in Lake View and Swan Lake in Carroll. It runs through several parks and the communities of Carnarvon, Breda and Maple River Junction. The multi-purpose recreational trail provides an outdoor recreational experience for the public, preserves a varied habitat for wildlife and preserving native vegetation.

== Education ==
The city is served by the East Sac County Community School District. It was a part of the Lake View-Auburn Community School District until July 1, 1996, when it merged into the Wall Lake View Auburn School District. That in turn merged into East Sac County on July 1, 2011.

Lake View has one school, the Jr/Sr High School for the district, serving grades 7-12. The elementary school is located in Sac City. It was formerly the combined high school and middle school for the Wall Lake View Auburn School District. The school's mascot is a Viking-inspired "Raider". As of the 2024-25 academic year, the superintendent is Nathan Hemiller and the principal of the high school is Tony Tedesco.

== See also ==
- A list of National Register of Historic Places in Lake View
