= Jackson Township, Sac County, Iowa =

Township in Sac County, Iowa, U.S.

Coordinates: 42°25′48″N 95°01′53″W

Jackson Township is a township in Sac County, Iowa, United States.

The township's elevation is listed as 1,273 feet above mean sea level.
