= Wall Lake View Auburn Community School District =

Defunct school district in Iowa, United States

Location
- Wall Lake, Iowa; United States

District information
- Type: public
- Motto: Pre-K – 12th grade
- Established: July 1, 1996; 29 years ago
- Closed: July 1, 2011

Wall Lake View Auburn Community School District was a school district in Iowa until it was consolidated in 1996. The district included an elementary campus in Wall Lake and a Middle School/High School campus in Lake View and Auburn.

Previously prekindergarten (bekindergarten) and 3-5 were in Wall Lake and K-2 were in Lake View. Middle school was in Wall Lake, and high school was in Lake View.

== History ==
The Lake View-Auburn Community School District and the Wall Lake Community School District consolidated into the WLVA district on July 1, 1996.

In 2007 the WLVA district and the Sac Community School District, prior to their legal merger, had established a grade-sharing program in which each district sent students to the other district for certain educational levels; it was under the name "East Sac Schools." Barb Kruthoff, the superintendent of the Wall Lake View Auburn district, became the shared superintendent of the two districts, and remained so up until 2010, just prior to the merger, so a new individual could become the superintendent of the legally combined school system. On July 1, 2011, the two districts legally merged into the East Sac County Community School District.
