= Odebolt–Arthur Community School District =

Defunct school district in Iowa, United States

Odebolt–Arthur Community School District (OA) was a school district headquartered in Odebolt, Iowa, which served that city and Arthur. It became a part of the consolidated Odebolt–Arthur–Battle Creek–Ida Grove Community School District effective July 1, 2018.

The district had territory in Crawford, Ida and Sac counties.

== History ==
The Odebolt–Arthur and the Battle Creek–Ida Grove Community School District, in 2009, started a "grade sharing" in which the districts sent their children to the same high school and shared personnel. There was a previous attempt to merge the districts in fall 2016, but voters from Odebolt–Arthur voted it down out of fear that their school would close. There were tensions between the Odebolt–Arthur and Battle Creek–Ida Grove communities. 425 voters of 757 in Odebolt-Arthur, or 57% of that district, voted it down, with 55% of the Odebolt-Arthur voters participating. In Battle Creek-ida Grove, 790 people voted, making up 24% of the registered voters, with 84% voting in favor. In order to pass the district merger, both districts each had to have one more vote than 50% in favor.

By 2018 the merger was approved.

== Schools ==
- High School
- Middle School
- Elementary School

== Enrollment ==
View source data.
