= Ida Grove, Iowa =

- City
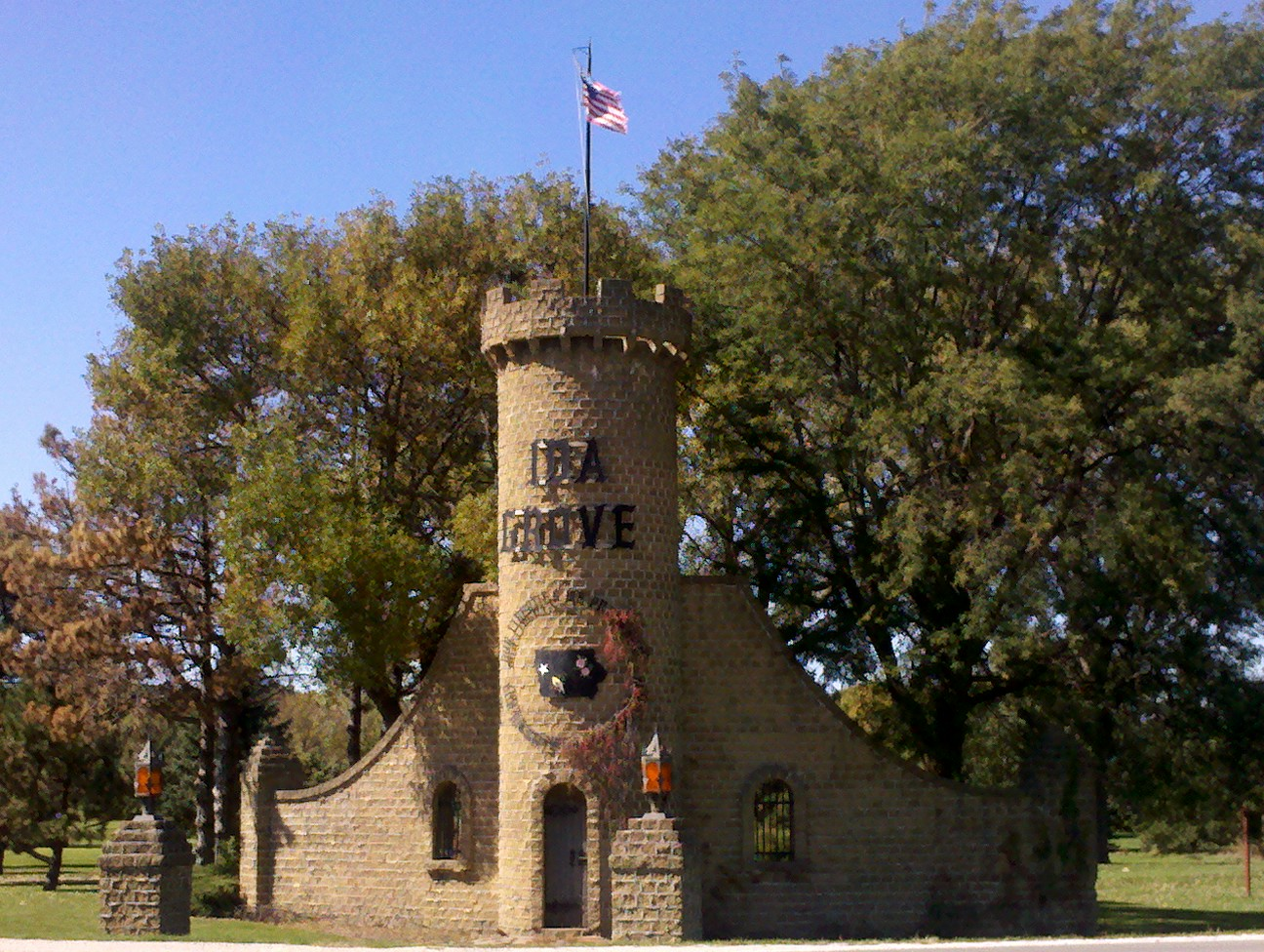
- Ida Grove welcome sign
- Nickname: The Grove
- Motto(s): "Castletown, USA"
- Location of Ida Grove, Iowa
- Coordinates: 42°20′38″N 95°28′24″W
- Country: United States
- State: Iowa
- County: Ida

Area
  - Total: 2.20 sq mi (5.71 km^{2})
  - Land: 2.20 sq mi (5.69 km^{2})
  - Water: 0.0077 sq mi (0.02 km^{2})
- Elevation: 1,230 ft (370 m)

Population (2020)
  - Total: 2,051
  - Density: 933.9/sq mi (360.59/km^{2})
- Time zone: UTC-6 (Central (CST))
  - Summer (DST): UTC-5 (CDT)
- ZIP code: 51445
- Area code: 712
- FIPS code: 19-38010
- GNIS feature ID: 2394463
- Website: www.idagroveia.com

Ida Grove is a city in Ida County, Iowa, United States. The population was 2,051 at the time of the 2020 census. It is the county seat of Ida County.

== History ==
Founded in 1871, the town now known as "Old Ida Grove" was located on the north side of the river. However, when the railroad was built through the neighborhood in 1877 on the south side, Ida Grove was relocated there.

Ida Grove was incorporated on May 31, 1878, and was named for the county, which was named for Mount Ida, Greece.

The Ida Grove post office contains an oil on linen mural, Preparation for the First County Fair in Ida Grove–1872, painted by Andrene Kauffman in 1940. Federally commissioned murals were produced from 1934 to 1943 in the United States through the Section of Fine Arts, of the Treasury Department.

== Geography ==
Ida Grove is located on US Route 59 and Iowa Highway 175 at the confluence of Odebolt Creek with Maple River. The Moorehead Pioneer Park and reservoir are located across the Maple River north of the city.

According to the United States Census Bureau, the city has a total area of 2.11 square miles (5.46 km^{2}), of which 2.10 square miles (5.44 km^{2}) is land and 0.01 square miles (0.03 km^{2}) is water.

== Demographics ==
Historical populations
Year	Pop.	±%
1870	30	—
1880	759	+2430.0%
1890	1,563	+105.9%
1900	1,967	+25.8%
1910	1,874	−4.7%
1920	2,020	+7.8%
1930	2,206	+9.2%
1940	2,238	+1.5%
1950	2,202	−1.6%
1960	2,265	+2.9%
1970	2,261	−0.2%
1980	2,285	+1.1%
1990	2,357	+3.2%
2000	2,350	−0.3%
2010	2,142	−8.9%
2020	2,051	−4.2%
Source:"U.S. Census website". United States Census Bureau. and Iowa Data Center; Source: U.S. Decennial Census

=== 2020 census ===
As of the 2020 census, Ida Grove had a population of 2,051, with 930 households and 541 families residing in the city. The population density was 933.9 inhabitants per square mile (360.6/km^{2}), and there were 1,083 housing units at an average density of 493.1 per square mile (190.4/km^{2}). The median age was 45.0 years. 21.6% of residents were under the age of 18 and 23.6% were 65 years of age or older. For every 100 females, there were 93.3 males, and for every 100 females age 18 and over there were 96.0 males age 18 and over. Age distribution was 24.0% under age 20, 5.3% from 20 to 24, 20.7% from 25 to 44, 26.4% from 45 to 64, and 23.6% age 65 or older. The gender makeup of the city was 48.3% male and 51.7% female.

0.0% of residents lived in urban areas, while 100.0% lived in rural areas.

Of the 930 households, 23.9% had children under the age of 18 living with them. Of all households, 44.1% were married-couple households, 7.7% were cohabiting-couple households, 20.8% were households with a male householder and no spouse or partner present, and 27.4% were households with a female householder and no spouse or partner present. About 41.8% of households were non-families; 36.4% of households were made up of individuals, and 16.8% had someone living alone who was 65 years of age or older.

Of the 1,083 housing units, 14.1% were vacant. The homeowner vacancy rate was 2.2% and the rental vacancy rate was 14.0%.

Racial composition as of the 2020 census
Race	Number	Percent
White	1,981	96.6%
Black or African American	8	0.4%
American Indian and Alaska Native	0	0.0%
Asian	4	0.2%
Native Hawaiian and Other Pacific Islander	4	0.2%
Some other race	13	0.6%
Two or more races	41	2.0%
Hispanic or Latino (of any race)	53	2.6%

=== 2010 census ===
As of the census of 2010, there were 2,142 people, 966 households, and 590 families living in the city. The population density was 1,020.0 inhabitants per square mile (393.8/km^{2}). There were 1,080 housing units at an average density of 514.3 per square mile (198.6/km^{2}). The racial makeup of the city was 98.2% White, 0.3% African American, 0.2% Native American, 0.1% Asian, 0.5% from other races, and 0.7% from two or more races. Hispanic or Latino of any race were 0.8% of the population.

There were 966 households, of which 26.8% had children under the age of 18 living with them, 47.3% were married couples living together, 10.1% had a female householder with no husband present, 3.6% had a male householder with no wife present, and 38.9% were non-families. 34.8% of all households were made up of individuals, and 17.3% had someone living alone who was 65 years of age or older. The average household size was 2.17 and the average family size was 2.76.

The median age in the city was 46.7 years. 23.7% of residents were under the age of 18; 5.9% were between the ages of 18 and 24; 18.5% were from 25 to 44; 28.2% were from 45 to 64; and 23.6% were 65 years of age or older. The gender makeup of the city was 47.8% male and 52.2% female.

=== 2000 census ===
As of the census of 2000, there were 2,350 people, 1,017 households, and 639 families living in the city. The population density was 1,129.7 inhabitants per square mile (436.2/km^{2}). There were 1,127 housing units at an average density of 541.8 per square mile (209.2/km^{2}). The racial makeup of the city was 98.94% White, 0.09% African American, 0.04% Native American, 0.17% Asian, 0.21% from other races, and 0.55% from two or more races. Hispanic or Latino of any race were 0.64% of the population.

There were 1,017 households, out of which 26.8% had children under the age of 18 living with them, 52.7% were married couples living together, 7.9% had a female householder with no husband present, and 37.1% were non-families. 34.5% of all households were made up of individuals, and 18.3% had someone living alone who was 65 years of age or older. The average household size was 2.25 and the average family size was 2.88.

23.9% are under the age of 18, 6.1% from 18 to 24, 23.6% from 25 to 44, 23.3% from 45 to 64, and 23.1% who were 65 years of age or older. The median age was 43 years. For every 100 females, there were 87.8 males. For every 100 females age 18 and over, there were 82.6 males.

The median income for a household in the city was $35,341, and the median income for a family was $46,213. Males had a median income of $31,185 versus $19,135 for females. The per capita income for the city was $20,698. About 4.6% of families and 7.7% of the population were below the poverty line, including 9.6% of those under age 18 and 6.5% of those age 65 or over.

== Education ==
Ida Grove is a part of the Odebolt–Arthur–Battle Creek–Ida Grove Community School District. It was formerly a part of the Battle Creek–Ida Grove Community School District, which was established in 1994, until its merger with the Odebolt–Arthur Community School District on July 1, 2018. Schools serving the community include OABCIG Elementary Ida Grove, OABCIG Middle School in Odebolt and OABCIG High School in Ida Grove. They are known as the Falcons.

== Economy ==
Since 1982, Ida Grove is home to Gomaco Trolley, a company that restores historical streetcars and builds replicas thereof for transit operators in North America.

== Notable people ==
- Cooper DeJean, National Football League cornerback
- Joel Dreessen, National Football League tight end
- Edith Heath, founder of Heath Ceramics
- Harold Hughes, governor of Iowa and U.S. senator
- Mildred Lillie, judge for the California Courts of Appeal
- George Pipgras, Major League Baseball player
- Floy Schoenfelder, polio survivor and advocate
