= Battle Creek–Ida Grove Community School District =

Former school district in Iowa

Battle Creek–Ida Grove Community School District was a school district headquartered in Ida Grove, Iowa, which served that city and Battle Creek. Established in 1966 and 1994, it became a part of the consolidated Odebolt–Arthur–Battle Creek–Ida Grove Community School District effective July 1, 2018.

The district had territory in Crawford, Ida and Woodbury counties.

== History ==
The district was established on July 1, 1994, as a merger of the former Battle Creek and Ida Grove school districts.

The former Odebolt–Arthur Community School District and the Battle Creek–Ida Grove district, in 2009, started a "grade sharing" in which the districts sent their children to the same high school and shared personnel. There was a previous attempt to merge the districts in fall 2016, but voters from Odebolt–Arthur voted it down out of fear that their school would close. There were tensions between the Odebolt–Arthur and Battle Creek–Ida Grove communities. 425 voters of 757 in Odebolt-Arthur, or 57% of that district, voted it down, with 55% of the Odebolt-Arthur voters participating. In Battle Creek-ida Grove, 790 people voted, making up 24% of the registered voters, with 84% voting in favor. In order to pass the district merger, both districts each had to have one more vote than 50% in favor.

By 2018 the merger was approved. The merger took effect July 1 of that year.

== Schools ==
- Battle Creek-Ida Grove High School - Ida Grove
  - It was built in 1971. As of 2003 it had 273 students.
- Battle Creek-Ida Grove Middle School - Battle Creek
  - It was built in 1960. As of 2002 it had 211 students.
- Battle Creek Elementary School
  - It was built in 1913. As of 2002 it had 90 students.
- Ida Grove Elementary School
  - It was built in 1959. As of 2002 it had 284 students.

At one point the elementary levels were consolidated to Ida Grove.
