= East Sac County Community School District =

Public school district in Lake View, Iowa, United States

Coordinates: 42.310367°N 95.056045°W

Location
- Lake View, Iowa Sac, Carroll, and Crawford counties United States
- Coordinates: 42.310367, -95.056045

District information
- Type: Local school district
- Grades: K-12
- Superintendent: Nathan Hemiller
- Schools: 2
- Budget: $12,528,000 (2020-21)
- NCES District ID: 1929580

Students and staff
- Students: 818 (2022-23)
- Teachers: 61.88 FTE
- Staff: 65.78 FTE
- Student–teacher ratio: 13.22
- Athletic conference: Twin Lakes
- District mascot: Raiders
- Colors: Red, White, and Black

Other information
- Website: www.eastsac.k12.ia.us

The East Sac County Community School District is a rural public school district headquartered in Lake View, Iowa. The district covers portions of Sac County as well as portions of Carroll and Crawford counties. It serves Lake View, Sac City, and Wall Lake.

== History ==
It was established on July 1, 2011, from the merger of the Sac Community School District and the Wall Lake View Auburn Community School District. In 2007, the districts, prior to their legal merger, had established a grade-sharing program in which each district sent students to the other district for certain educational levels; it was under the name "East Sac Schools."

Keven Fiene served as superintendent until April 2014, when he took a position with the Interstate 35 School District. East Sac asked the South Central Calhoun Community School District if it could share a superintendent, but South Central Calhoun declined the offer. Barb Kruthoff, who had previously been superintendent of the Wall Lake View Auburn district and then also of the Sac district when the two did the grade sharing program, became the interim superintendent in June of that year.

For the 2019–20 school year, the board hired Jeff Kruse as superintendent, sharing duties with Ar-We-Va and South Central Calhoun districts.

== Schools ==
Schools include:

- East Sac County Jr/Sr High School (7-12) – Lake View
- East Sac County Elementary Sac City (PK-6)

Other facilities:

- Flex Ed Center – Sac City

Former schools:

- East Sac County Elementary (pk-4) – Wall Lake
- East Sac County Middle School (5-8) – Sac City

=== East Sac County High School ===
==== Athletics ====
The Raiders compete in the Twin Lakes Conference in the following sports:

- Cross Country
- Volleyball
- Football
- Basketball
- Wrestling
- Track and Field
- Golf
  - Coed 2-time Class 1A State Champions (2012, 2014)
- Baseball
- Softball

== See also ==
- List of school districts in Iowa
- List of high schools in Iowa
