= U.S. Route 20 in Iowa =

Section of U.S. Highway in Iowa

U.S. Highway 20
- US 20 highlighted in red

Route information
- Maintained by Iowa DOT
- Length: 300.270 mi (483.238 km)
- Existed: 1926–present

Major junctions
- West end: I-129 / US 20 / US 75 at South Sioux City, NE
- I-29 in Sioux City; US 75 at Sioux City; US 71 near Early and Sac City; US 169 near Fort Dodge; I-35 near Williams; US 65 near Iowa Falls; I-380 / US 218 in Waterloo; US 52 in Dubuque; US 61 / US 151 in Dubuque
- East end: US 20 at East Dubuque, IL

Location
- Country: United States
- State: Iowa
- Counties: Woodbury; Ida; Sac; Calhoun; Webster; Hamilton; Hardin; Grundy; Black Hawk; Buchanan; Delaware; Dubuque

Highway system
- United States Numbered Highway System; List; Special; Divided; Iowa Primary Highway System; Interstate; US; State; Secondary; Scenic
← US 18	→ Iowa 21

U.S. Highway 20 (US 20) in Iowa is a major east–west artery which runs across the state, separating the northern third of Iowa from the southern two-thirds. It enters Iowa from Nebraska, concurrent with Interstate 129 (I-129) and US 75, crossing the Missouri River at Sioux City. US 20 runs in a more-or-less straight line across Iowa, paralleling 42° 27' N. It leaves Iowa in Dubuque by crossing the Mississippi River into Illinois. Since October 2018, US 20 is a four-lane divided highway for its entire length in Iowa.

== Route description ==
US 20 enters Iowa on the Sergeant Floyd Memorial Bridge, which also carries I-129 and US 75 over the Missouri River. Almost immediately upon landing in Iowa, there is an interchange with I-29, at which I-129 ends. Continuing east, US 20 and US 75 run together around the southern and eastern sides of Sioux City. The two routes split at the Gordon Drive (US 20 Business, or US 20 Bus.) interchange as US 20 exits to the east from Sioux City. The expressway is an older section that goes through Lawton and comes to a stop sign at Moville. About three miles (4.8 km) further east, at Ida Avenue (County Route D22, or CR D22), the newest four-lane stretch (except for a short expressway segment just south of Holstein that is briefly concurrent with US 59) starts and goes to about one mile (1.6 km) west of an interchange with US 71 and Iowa Highway 471 (Iowa 471), just north of Early. From this point until an interchange with Iowa 4 northwest of Rockwell City is the second newest section of four-lane, which opened in November 2012. This new roadway passes to the north of Sac City and Lytton and has another interchange with the realigned route of US 71 northeast of Sac City but mostly has at-grade intersections, including CR M54 into Sac City and CR N28 into Lytton.

East of Iowa 4, and extending to the former beginning of the four-lane expressway northeast of Moorland (now an interchange with CR D36), is a four-lane section which opened in December 2010 and bypasses Rockwell City to the north. US 20 continues until just south of Highview, when it becomes a full Interstate-standard freeway. The expressway south of Fort Dodge has interchanges with US 169 and CR P59. East of Fort Dodge, US 20 overlaps with Iowa 17 for 4.5 miles (7.2 km), ending at Webster City. Near Williams, US 20 intersects I-35. Beginning at the interchange with US 65 is a section of four-lane freeway which, when completed, shaved nearly 16 miles (26 km) off US 20's length. Prior to 2003, US 20 joined US 65 north through Iowa Falls and then east toward Ackley and Parkersburg before heading south again to the freeway with Iowa 14. The bridge crossing the Iowa River near Steamboat Rock is a launched steel I-girder bridge, the first of its kind in the U.S. The bridge was designed to cross the old-growth woodland of the Iowa River valley with minimal impact.

US 20 continues east toward Cedar Falls where it overlaps Iowa 58 for just over one mile (1.6 km). The western junction of Iowa 58 (Hudson Road) connects traffic to the University of Northern Iowa while the eastern junction of Iowa 58 is also the western junction of Iowa 27, the Avenue of the Saints. Another mile (1.6 km) east, in Waterloo, US 20 intersects US 63 (Sergeant Road). On the southeast side of Waterloo, I-380 joins US 20/Iowa 27 for six miles (9.7 km) before exiting with Iowa 27 south toward Cedar Rapids.

US 20 continues as a freeway east of Waterloo. It intersects Iowa 150 at Independence and Iowa 13 at Manchester, as well as junctioning a number of county roads serving smaller communities. Approximately 21 miles (34 km) between Independence and Manchester, the highway goes over a terminal moraine and enters the Driftless Area, a region it will not exit until reaching Stockton, Illinois.

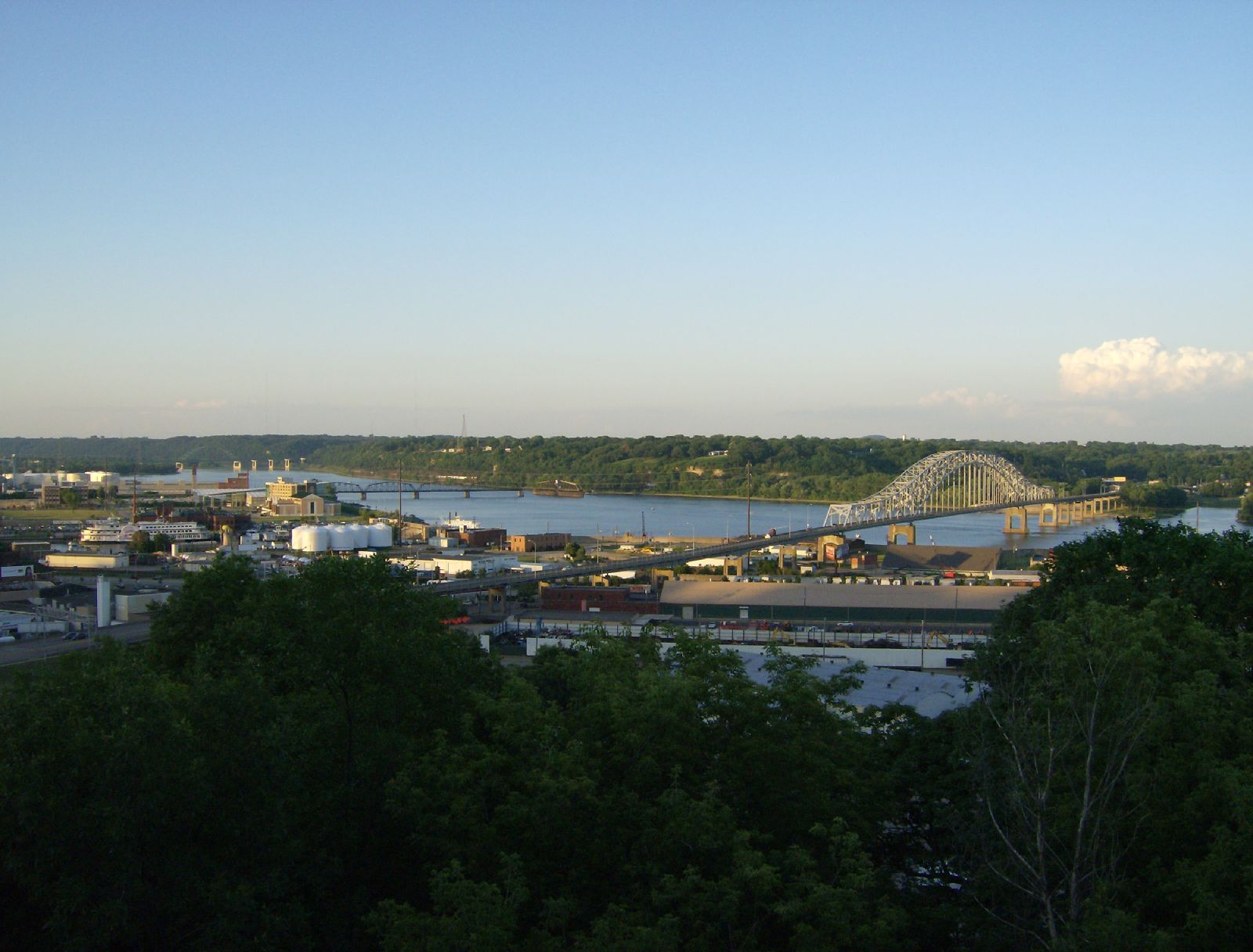
US 20 crosses the Mississippi River at Dubuque using the Julien Dubuque Bridge.

At Delaware, US 20 changes from a freeway to an expressway with at-grade intersections; however, there are many interchanges where US 20 meets major roads, mostly at the villages and towns along US 20's route. US 20 serves Earlville, Dyersville (where US 52 joins the route and passing near the Field of Dreams filming site), Farley, Epworth, and Peosta before entering Dubuque. On the western edge of Dubuque, an interchange onto the Southwest Arterial routes US 52 around the southern outskirts of the city, connecting to US 61 and US 151. US 20 remains at least four lanes through Dubuque, but there are nine stoplights along the route, particularly on the western edge of the city. There is a brief controlled-access section where the highway descends into the Mississippi River valley. Near the river, Locust Street (Iowa 946) connects US 20 with US 61 and US 151, which have entered the city from the south as an expressway and continue northward as a freeway. US 20 crosses from Iowa into Illinois via the Julien Dubuque Bridge.

== History ==
Primitive conditions grew apace as we went west from Cedar Falls. From Alden to Webster City, twenty-five miles [40 km], with the exception of a stage station where horses were changed, there was nothing but the virgin prairie. Not a bush nor a running brook broke the monotony. From Webster City to Fort Dodge, twenty miles [32 km], there was no house but that of the enterprising muskrat. [...] Here was a route from Cedar Falls to Sioux City, two hundred miles [320 km] long in a straight line, that typified the highest stage of development west of the railroads. Yet it was wilder than I know how to tell, and north of these wild conditions were wilder still, and wilder grew the farther we went.

— Anson Bicknell in 1862

US 20 was designated in Iowa on October 16, 1926. The designation created a single route number for drivers to follow across the state from Sioux City to Dubuque; previously, three route numbers were used.

It is possible to drive most of US 20's former two-lane alignment from Early to Dubuque. Most of this routing (with the exception of Iowa 57 from US 65 to Cedar Falls) is now under city and county control, but most of the guide signs remain from when US 20 followed this route. From Moorland, the highway's former alignment is US 20 Bus. through Fort Dodge. At CR P59, it continues on CR D20. The road changes designations several times between this point and Iowa Falls, but its route is very clear. It follows US 65 north out of Iowa Falls to the junction of Iowa 57, then follows Iowa 57 to Cedar Falls. At Cedar Falls, the former alignment continues on US 218 to Broadway Street; through Waterloo, it follows Broadway to Franklin Street to Dubuque Road. Beyond Waterloo, the designation of the road again changes several times, but the route to follow remains clear. Between Dyersville and Farley, US 20 follows its historic alignment. At Farley, the former alignment follows Old Highway Road into Dubuque.

=== Expansion project ===
The first segment of US 20 in Iowa to become four lanes was a short expressway segment east of Moville, which opened in 1958. Another short expressway segment in the Dubuque area opened in 1959. The rest of the expressway from Sioux City to Moville opened in 1964. By 1979, the Sioux City bypass was complete, as well as the section from Iowa 17 to I-35, and the section from Independence to Delaware. By the end of the 1980s, the four-lane portions of US 20 ran from Coalville (near Fort Dodge) to I-35 and from Waterloo to Dubuque.

During the 1990s, little work was done to the route. It was extended westward to US 169 in 1991 and eastward to US 65 the same year, though, initially, the section from I-35 to US 65 was only two lanes. The new, semi-controlled section in Dubuque opened in 1996. Work began to accelerate in 2000, with the section between I-35 and US 65 becoming four lanes that year. The segment from Iowa 14 to Cedar Falls also opened in 2000. By 2003, the highway was complete from Fort Dodge to Dubuque.

Paving work between Iowa 4 and Moorland was completed in 2010 and the stretch was opened in December 2010. In November 2012, the four-lane highway opened between Iowa 4 near Rockwell City and US 71 at Early.

As of January 2014, around 40 miles (64 km) of US 20 remained two lane, between Early and Moville. Local leaders were lobbying for the remaining estimated cost of $375 million (equivalent to $488 million in 2024) to complete the project. In November 2015, it was announced that the aforementioned 40 miles (64 km) of US 20 would be widened to four lanes at an estimated cost of $240 million (equivalent to $309 million in 2024). The funding came from the state's gas tax increase. The final segment was completed in October 2018.

== Exit list ==
County	Location	mi	km	Exit	Destinations	Notes
Missouri River		0.000	0.000		I-129 west / US 20 west / US 75 south – South Sioux City	Continuation into Nebraska
Missouri River		0.000	0.000		Sergeant Floyd Memorial Bridge; Nebraska–Iowa state line	
Woodbury	Sioux City	0.286	0.460	1	I-129 ends / I-29 / US 75 Bus. – Council Bluffs, Sioux Gateway Airport, Downtown Sioux City	Exit numbers follow I-129; signed as exits 1A (south) and 1B (north) northbound; no exit number southbound; northern end of I-129 overlap
Woodbury	Sioux City	1.742	2.803	1	Lakeport Street	Exit numbers follow US 20
Woodbury	Sioux City	2.867	4.614	2	Sunnybrook Drive	
Woodbury	Sioux City	3.409	5.486	3	Morningside Avenue	Former Iowa 982
Woodbury	Sioux City	4.060– 4.857	6.534– 7.817	4	US 20 Bus. west (IA 12 north / Gordon Drive) / US 75 north – Sioux City Business District, Le Mars	Eastern end of US 75 overlap; no exit number westbound
Woodbury	Banner–Arlington township line	15.720	25.299		Historic US 20 west (Correctionville Road)	Former US 20
Woodbury	Moville	17.209	27.695		Iowa 140 north (1st Street) – Kingsley	
Woodbury	Arlington Township	20.011	32.205		Historic US 20 east / CR D22	Former US 20
Woodbury	Correctionville	31.782	51.148		Iowa 31 south – Smithland	Western end of Iowa 31 overlap
Woodbury	Correctionville	32.027	51.542		Iowa 31 north – Correctionville, Washta	Eastern end of Iowa 31 overlap
Woodbury–Ida county line	Rock–Douglas township line	37.931	61.044		CR L43 – Cushing	Former Iowa 403
Ida	Douglas–Battle township line	39.427	63.452		Historic US 20 west / CR L51	Former US 20
Ida	Holstein	44.511	71.634		US 59 north / Historic US 20 east – Holstein	Western end of US 59 overlap
Ida	Logan Township	45.922	73.904		US 59 south – Ida Grove	Eastern end of US 59 overlap
Ida	Galva–Silver Creek township line	51.044	82.147		CR M25 – Galva	Former Iowa 328
Sac	Eureka–Eden township line	57.573	92.655		Iowa 110 north / Historic US 20 west – Schaller, Storm Lake	
Sac	Cook–Eden township line	59.835	96.295		Historic US 20 east / CR M43	Former US 20
Sac	Boyer Valley Township	64.780	104.253	71	US 71 north / Iowa 471 south – Storm Lake, Lake View	Western end of US 71 overlap
Sac	Cedar Township	75.253	121.108	82	US 71 south / CR N14 north – Sac City	Eastern end of US 71 overlap; former Iowa 196
Calhoun	Twin Lakes Township	89.869	144.630	96	Iowa 4 – Rockwell City, Pocahontas	
Webster	Fulton Township	109.494	176.214	116	US 20 Bus. east / Historic US 20 east / CR D20 – Moorland, Fort Dodge	US 20 Business only signed eastbound
Webster	Elkhorn Township	114.775	184.712	121	US 169 – Fort Dodge, Humboldt	
Webster	Pleasant Valley Township	117.928	189.787	124	US 20 Bus. west / CR P59 – Fort Dodge, Coalville	US 20 Business only signed westbound
Hamilton	Freedom Township	129.143	207.836	136	Iowa 17 north / CR R21 – Eagle Grove, Stratford	Western end of Iowa 17 overlap
Hamilton	Webster City	133.690	215.153	140	Iowa 17 south – Webster City, Stanhope	Eastern end of Iowa 17 overlap
Hamilton	Independence Township	138.666	223.161	145	CR R38 – Kamrar	
Hamilton	Liberty Township	142.664	229.595	149	US 69 – Jewell, Belmond	
Hamilton	Rose Grove Township	146.299	235.445	153	I-35 – Des Moines, Mason City	Signed as exit 153A (south) and 153B (north)
Hamilton	Rose Grove Township	148.753	239.395	155	CR R77 – Williams	
Hardin	Buckeye Township	155.669	250.525	162	CR S27 – Alden, Buckeye	Former Iowa 359
Hardin	Ellis Township	162.039	260.776	168	US 65 – Iowa Falls, Hubbard	Former US 20
Hardin	Jackson Township	168.635	271.392	175	CR D35 – Eldora, Owasa, Steamboat Rock	
Hardin	Clay Township	174.304	280.515	181	CR S56 – Ackley, Eldora	
Grundy	Shiloh Township	180.874	291.088	187	CR T19 – Wellsburg	
Grundy	Colfax–Lincoln township line	188.882	303.976	208	Iowa 14 – Parkersburg, Grundy Center	Former US 20
Grundy	Dike	195.896	315.264	215	CR T55 – Dike, New Hartford	
Grundy–Black Hawk county line	Grant–Black Hawk township line	200.945	323.390	220	CR T69 – Cedar Falls	
Black Hawk	Cedar Falls–Hudson city line	204.452	329.034	224	Iowa 58 south (Hudson Road) – Hudson, University of Northern Iowa, UNI-Dome	Western end of Iowa 58 overlap
Black Hawk	Cedar Falls–Hudson city line	205.539	330.783	225	Iowa 27 north (Avenue of the Saints) / Iowa 58 north – Cedar Falls, Airport	Eastern end of Iowa 58 overlap; western end of Iowa 27 overlap
Black Hawk	Waterloo	207.596	334.093	227	US 63 (Sergeant Road) – Hudson	
Black Hawk	Waterloo	209.130	336.562	229	Ansborough Avenue	
Black Hawk	Waterloo	210.638	338.989	230	Iowa 21 south (Hawkeye Road) – Dysart	
Black Hawk	Waterloo	212.423– 212.834	341.862– 342.523	232 71	I-380 north / US 218 – Waterloo, La Porte City	Western end of I-380 overlap; exit numbers follow I-380
Black Hawk	Evansdale	213.229	343.159	70	River Forest Road	
Black Hawk	Evansdale	215.485	346.789	68	Evansdale Drive – Elk Run Heights	
Black Hawk	Poyner Township	217.400	349.871	66	CR V49 – Raymond, Gilbertville	Former Iowa 297
Black Hawk	Poyner Township	218.077– 218.849	350.961– 352.203	65	I-380 south / Iowa 27 south (Avenue of the Saints)	Eastern end of I-380 and Iowa 27 overlaps; exit numbers follow US 20
Black Hawk	Fox Township	220.349	354.617	240	CR V51 – Dunkerton, La Porte City	
Buchanan	Westburg Township	225.782	363.361	245	CR V65 – Jesup	
Buchanan	Independence	232.773	374.612	252	Independence	Former Iowa 248
Buchanan	Independence	237.271	381.851	254	Iowa 150 – Independence, Vinton	
Buchanan	Winthrop	241.366	388.441	261	CR W40 – Quasqueton, Winthrop	Former Iowa 282
Buchanan	Middlefield Township	246.806	397.196	266	Iowa 187 north – Masonville, Lamont	
Delaware	Prairie–Milo township line	255.303	410.870	275	Iowa 13 – Manchester, Central City	
Delaware	Manchester	257.248	414.001	277	CR D5X – Manchester	
Delaware	Delaware	262.311	422.149	282	Iowa 38 – Delaware, Monticello	
Delaware	Oneida–Delhi township line	266.027	428.129	285	CR X35 – Earlville	
Delaware	Dyersville	272.428	438.430	292	CR X49 – Dyersville	
Dubuque	Dyersville	274.126	441.163	294	US 52 north / Iowa 136 – Dyersville, Cascade	Western end of US 52 overlap
Dubuque	Dodge Township	276.030	444.227		Historic US 20 west (Olde Hawkeye Road)	Former US 20
Dubuque	Dodge Township	277.695	446.907		Historic US 20 east (Sullivan Road)	Former US 20
Dubuque	Farley	279.261	449.427		Historic US 20 (1st Avenue NW)	Former US 20
Dubuque	Farley	280.294	451.089	300	CR Y13 – Farley	
Dubuque	Epworth	284.104	457.221	304	CR Y17 – Epworth	
Dubuque	Peosta	288.278	463.938	308	CR Y21 – Northeast Iowa Community College	
Dubuque	Vernon Township	291.534	469.178	311	Swiss Valley Road / North Cascade Road	
Dubuque	Dubuque	294.312	473.649	314	US 52 (Southwest Arterial) – Asbury, Bellevue	Eastern end of US 52 overlap
Dubuque	Dubuque	295.448	475.477		Historic US 20 west (Old Highway Road)	Former US 20
Dubuque	Dubuque	295.897	476.200		Northwest Arterial	Former Iowa 32
Dubuque	Dubuque	296.260	476.784		Historic US 20 east (Crescent Ridge)	Former US 20
Dubuque	Dubuque	297.175	478.257		Historic US 20 (Cedar Cross Road / John F. Kennedy Road)	Former US 20
Dubuque	Dubuque	298.519– 298.644	480.420– 480.621	—	Grandview Avenue / Fremont Avenue – College Grandview District	
Dubuque	Dubuque	299.088	481.335	—	Hill Street / Bryant Street	Right-in/right-out interchange
Dubuque	Dubuque	299.776	482.443		Locust Street (Iowa 946) / Historic US 20 west to US 61 / US 151	
Mississippi River		300.270	483.238		Julien Dubuque Bridge; Iowa–Illinois state line	
Mississippi River		300.270	483.238		US 20 east – Rockford	Continuation into Illinois
1.000 mi = 1.609 km; 1.000 km = 0.621 mi: Concurrency terminus; Unopened

== Related route ==
Iowa Highway 946
- Location: Dubuque
- Length: 1.030 mi (1.658 km)
- Existed: 1991–present

Iowa Highway 946 (Iowa 946) is a short route that begins at a partial trumpet interchange along the US 61/US 151 expressway. Northbound traffic passes beneath the expressway and joins southbound traffic on Locust Street. In the half-mile (800 m) between US 61/US 151 and US 20, Iowa 946 passes a light industrial area containing a Hy-Vee grocery store.

Iowa 946 highlighted in red

Iowa 946 intersects US 20, known locally as Dodge Street, at a signal-controlled intersection. Immediately east of this intersection is the approach to the Julien Dubuque Bridge, which carries US 20 across the Mississippi River into East Dubuque, Illinois. Iowa 946 continues north on Locust Street for 1,000 feet (300 m) through another light industrial area. At the edge of downtown Dubuque, Iowa 946 turns east for 600 feet (180 m) where it meets US 61/US 151 just west of Dubuque's Ice Harbor. Iowa 946 was created along Locust Street upon the staggered completion of an expressway starting in 1991 which relocated US 52, US 61, and US 151 away from Locust Street and closer to the Mississippi River. The new expressway carried the three routes beneath the approach to the Julien Dubuque Bridge, making a direct intersection impossible. Since all four routes are U.S. Highways and come from all directions, it was imperative to keep the routes connected. With the completion of the Southwest Arterial around the southern edge of Dubuque, US 52 has been rerouted away from the downtown area.

U.S. Route 20
Previous state: Nebraska	Iowa	Next state: Illinois
