= U.S. Route 20 =

Highway in the United States

U.S. Route 20
- US 20 highlighted in red; the gap represents the unofficial segment through Yellowstone National Park

Route information
- Length: 3,254.49 mi (5,237.59 km)
- Existed: November 11, 1926–present

Major junctions
- West end: US 101 in Newport, OR
- I-5 at Albany, OR; I-15 at Idaho Falls, ID; I-25 at Casper, WY; I-35 near Williams, IA; I-55 at Hodgkins, IL; I-65 at Gary, IN; I-90 at various locations; I-75 at Perrysburg, OH; I-79 at Erie, PA; I-95 at Waltham, MA
- East end: Route 2 in Boston, MA

Location
- Country: United States
- States: Oregon, Idaho, Montana, Wyoming, Nebraska, Iowa, Illinois, Indiana, Ohio, Pennsylvania, New York, Massachusetts

Highway system
- United States Numbered Highway System; List; Special; Divided
← US 19	US	→ US 21
← Route 4	N.E.	→ Route 6

U.S. Route 20 or U.S. Highway 20 (US 20) is an east–west United States Numbered Highway, which stretches from the Pacific Northwest east to New England. The "0" in its route number indicates that US 20 is a major coast-to-coast route. Spanning 3,254.49 miles (5,237.59 km), it is the longest road in the United States, and, in the east, the route is roughly parallel to Interstate 90 (I-90), which is the longest Interstate Highway in the U.S. There is a discontinuity in the official designation of US 20 through Yellowstone National Park, with unnumbered roads used to traverse the park.

US 20 and US 30 break the general U.S. Route numbering rules in Oregon, since US 30 actually starts north of US 20 in Astoria, and runs parallel to the north throughout the state (the Columbia River and Interstate 84). The two run concurrently and continue in the correct positioning near Caldwell, Idaho. This is because US 20 was not a planned coast-to-coast route while US 30 was. US 20 originally ended at the eastern entrance of Yellowstone Park; it was extended in 1940.

The highway's eastern terminus is in Boston, Massachusetts, at Kenmore Square, where it meets Massachusetts Route 2. Its western terminus is in Newport, Oregon, at an intersection with US 101, within a mile of the Pacific Ocean.

== Route description ==
Lengths
	mi	km
Oregon	451.25	726.22
Idaho	406.30	653.88
Montana	9.68	15.58
Western segment	867.23	1,395.67
Wyoming	434.00	698.46
Nebraska	431.60	694.59
Iowa	300.27	483.24
Illinois	233.93	376.47
Indiana	155.73	250.62
Ohio	260.54	419.30
Pennsylvania	45.43	73.11
New York	372.32	599.19
Massachusetts	153.44	246.94
Eastern segment	2,387.26	3,841.92
Total	3,254.49	5,237.59

=== Oregon ===
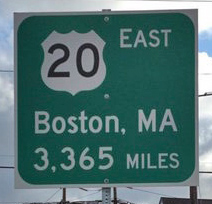
Sign at western origin in Newport, Oregon

US 20 begins at an intersection with US 101 in Newport, Oregon, and runs generally eastward towards Idaho. On the way it goes over the Central Oregon Coast Range, through several Willamette Valley cities including Corvallis and Albany, climbs the Cascade Mountains over Santiam Pass, goes through Bend, and traverses the Oregon High Desert after passing through Burns. It eventually overlaps US 26 in Vale, and the two highways continue concurrently to the Idaho border.

=== Idaho ===
US 20 crosses into Idaho from Oregon northwest of Parma. It runs concurrently with US 26 and joins US 95 through Parma. US 20/US 26 leaves US 95 southeast of Parma and runs to Caldwell where US 20/US 26 joins with I-84 and US 30 for a short time. These four highways parallel each other (on two roadways) to Boise where US 20/US 26 runs through downtown before joining with I-84 and US 30 again to Mountain Home, where it departs at exit 95 to head east, past Rattlesnake Station, Anderson Ranch Dam road, and cresting at Cat Creek summit at 5,527 feet (1,685 m) above mean sea level. It continues into and across Camas County through Fairfield to Timmerman Junction, the intersection in Blaine County with State Highway 75, the route to Sun Valley, Galena Summit, and Stanley. US 20 continues east through Picabo and Carey, joined with US 26 and US 93, to Craters of the Moon and Arco, where US 93 splits off and turns north-northwest to climb the Big Lost River valley. US 20/US 26 continues on through the Idaho National Laboratory, where the highways split just west of Atomic City; US 26 heads to Blackfoot and US 20 to Idaho Falls, where it turns north-northeast to pass near Rexburg as a freeway. US 20 then climbs through the communities of St. Anthony, Ashton, and Island Park, and crosses the Continental Divide at Targhee Pass at 7,072 feet (2,156 m), entering Montana west of West Yellowstone.

=== Montana ===
In the state of Montana, US 20 runs for less than 10 miles (16 km). It runs from the Idaho state line to West Yellowstone, Montana, the western entrance to Yellowstone National Park. US 20 is known as the Targhee Pass Highway in Montana.

While US 20 and other U.S. Routes are officially discontinuous through the park, some commercially produced maps show these highways running inside Yellowstone National Park itself along its unnumbered roads and across the Montana–Wyoming state line.

=== Wyoming ===
In the state of Wyoming, the eastern segment of US 20 starts at the eastern entrance to Yellowstone National Park along with the western termini of US 14 and US 16. These three routes run east to Greybull, where US 14 continues east and US 16/US 20 turns south; at Worland, US 16 turns east while US 20 continues south, passing through Wind River Canyon south of Thermopolis. US 20 joins US 26 in Shoshoni, where it turns east, and they continue all the way through Casper. From Casper, the two highways parallel I-25 and US 87 for 26 miles, until all four link up together just southeast of Glenrock. These four routes stay combined to Orin, where US 20 turns east from I-25, at the western end of US 18. US 18 and US 20 are concurrent from Orin to Lusk, where US 18 turns north and US 20 continues east into Nebraska.

=== Nebraska ===
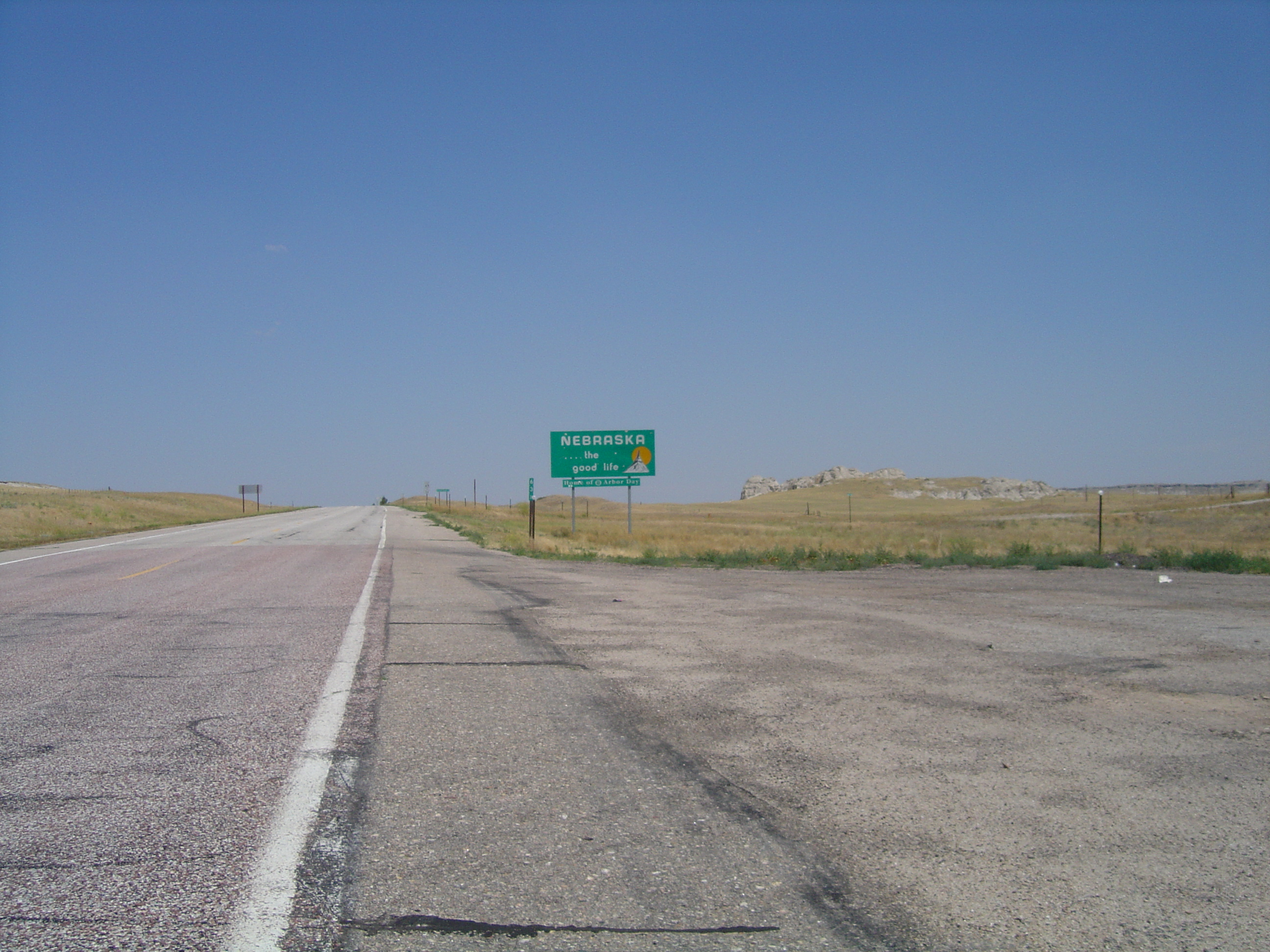
US 20 enters Nebraska from Wyoming

Within Nebraska, US 20 is a state highway that begins on the Wyoming–Nebraska state line west of Harrison near the Niobrara River and runs to the Nebraska–Iowa state line in South Sioux City. Throughout its 431.60-mile (694.59 km) length the route passes through a diverse range of landscapes including bluffs and escarpments in the Northwest Panhandle, the Nebraska Sandhills in the northern part of the state, and rolling hills and plains through Randolph, Nebraska as the highway approaches the Missouri River valley south of Sioux City, Iowa. Throughout its length, US 20 is a two-lane highway with the exception of the easternmost 8.45 miles (13.60 km) which is four-lane divided highway, the last 3.21 miles (5.17 km) of which is concurrent with Interstate 129.

=== Iowa ===
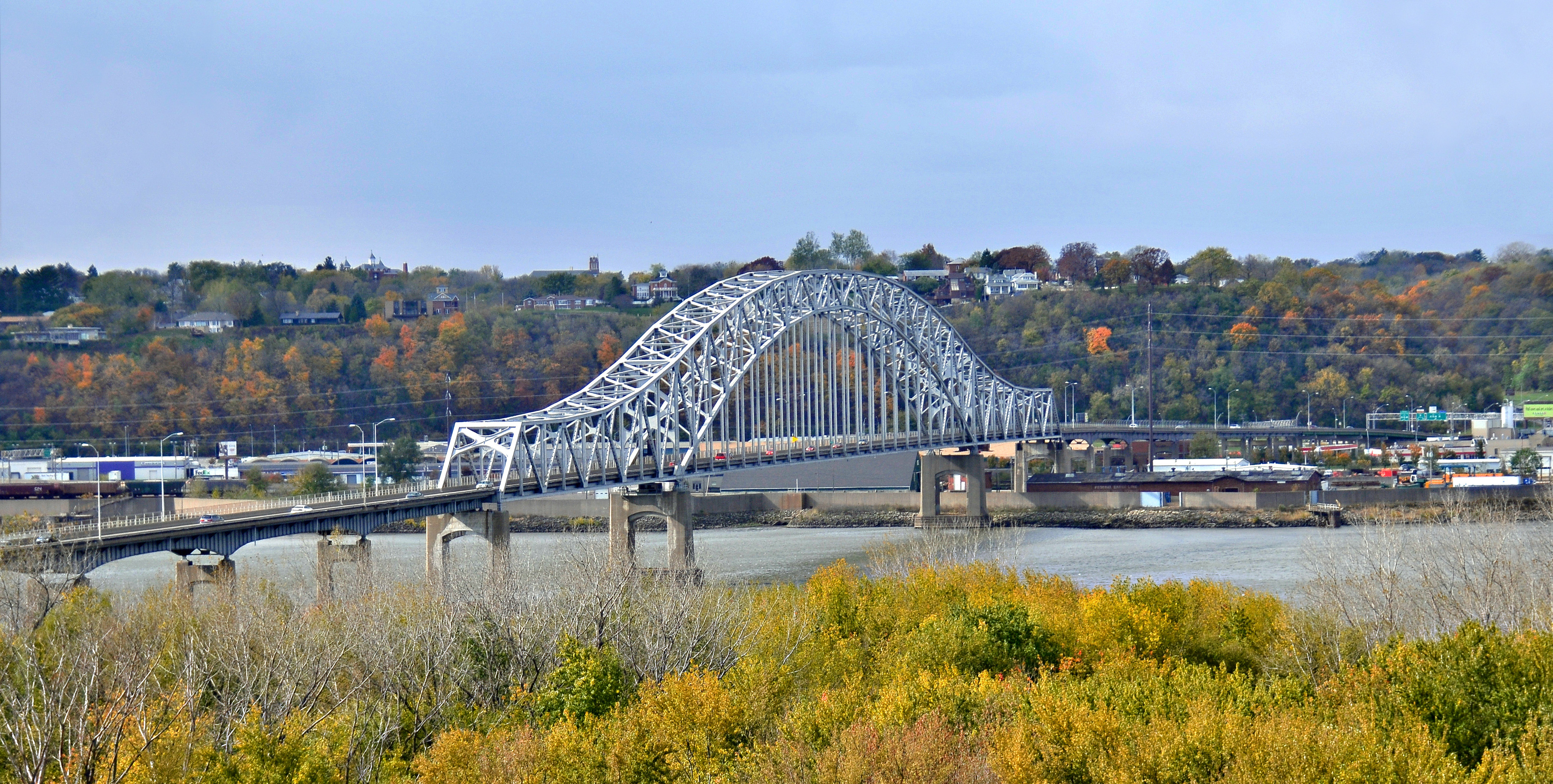
US 20 crosses the Mississippi River connecting Dubuque, Iowa, and East Dubuque, Illinois

US 20 enters Iowa at Sioux City via the Missouri River crossing with I-129 and US 75. After skirting the southeast side of Sioux City as a freeway with US 75, US 20 continues east as an expressway to Moville. From Moville through north of Early at the junction with U.S. Route 71 and Iowa Highway 471, US 20 was reconstructed from a rural two-lane highway to a four-lane road. This segment re-opened October 19, 2018 and made it so that US 20 is a continuous four-lane highway for its entire length in Iowa. It passes to the north of Sac City, where it has another interchange with the realigned U.S. Route 71, then passes to the south of Fort Dodge and Webster City before intersecting I-35 near Williams.

A new segment of freeway between US 65 south of Iowa Falls and Iowa Highway 14 opened in 2003 creating a continuous four-lane route from Moorland to Dubuque. The new segment shaved 16 miles (26 km) off US 20's length in Iowa. In the Waterloo/Cedar Falls area, the segment of US 20 overlapped by the Avenue of the Saints, which is also designated as Iowa Highway 27. US 20 passes Independence, Manchester, and Dyersville before reaching Dubuque. At Dubuque, US 20 crosses into Illinois over the Julien Dubuque Bridge.

=== Illinois ===
In the state of Illinois, US 20 begins in East Dubuque, following southeastward along the Mississippi River, and continues into the very hilly Driftless Area of northwest Illinois through Galena and Elizabeth. The highway then transitions eastward from the Driftless Area to the Interior Plains near Stockton. The road continues as a bypass north of Freeport, and then runs as a freeway along the southern fringe of Rockford. From Rockford to Chicago, Illinois, US 20 is a mixture of four-lane expressway, four-lane limited access freeway, and winding two-lane surface road. It is signed as "General U.S. Grant Highway" after Ulysses S. Grant. U.S. 20 runs through the south side of Chicago as 95th Street. US 20 exits Illinois along with US 12 and US 41 as Indianapolis Boulevard south of the Chicago Skyway.

=== Indiana ===
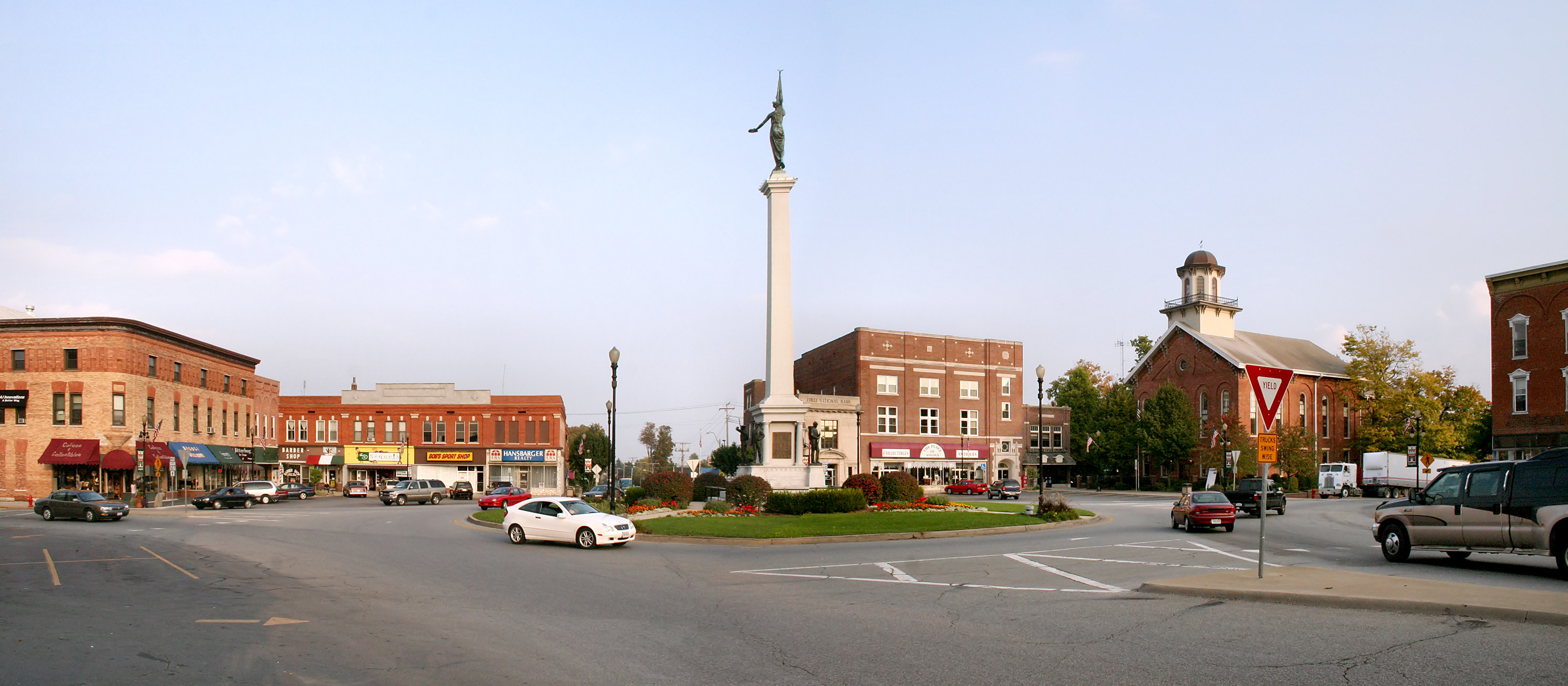
Looking eastbound at US 20 as it meets State Road 127 in a traffic circle in Angola, Indiana

In the state of Indiana, US 20 enters from the west beneath the Chicago Skyway with US 12 and US 41. US 20 passes through heavily industrialized northwestern Indiana and is the main east–west artery through Gary. It then parallels US 12 to just west of Michigan City before running due east through New Carlisle to South Bend. US 20 travels around South Bend and Elkhart on the St. Joseph Valley Parkway, a four-lane limited access freeway, then returns to surface road east of Elkhart. US 20 then passes through LaGrange and Angola, intersecting with I-69 before leaving Indiana just north of the eastern terminus of the Indiana Toll Road.

From Gary to South Bend, US 20 was built as the Dunes Relief Road. During the 1930s and 1940s the Dunes Highway, US 12, was becoming more crowded as housing lots and communities developed in the Indiana Dunes. Today, there are numerous communities along US 20 and the lakefront, including Gary, Portage, Burns Harbor, Porter, Chesterton, Pines, and Michigan City.

Most notably, the route is one of the main access roads to Indiana Dunes National Park.

=== Ohio ===
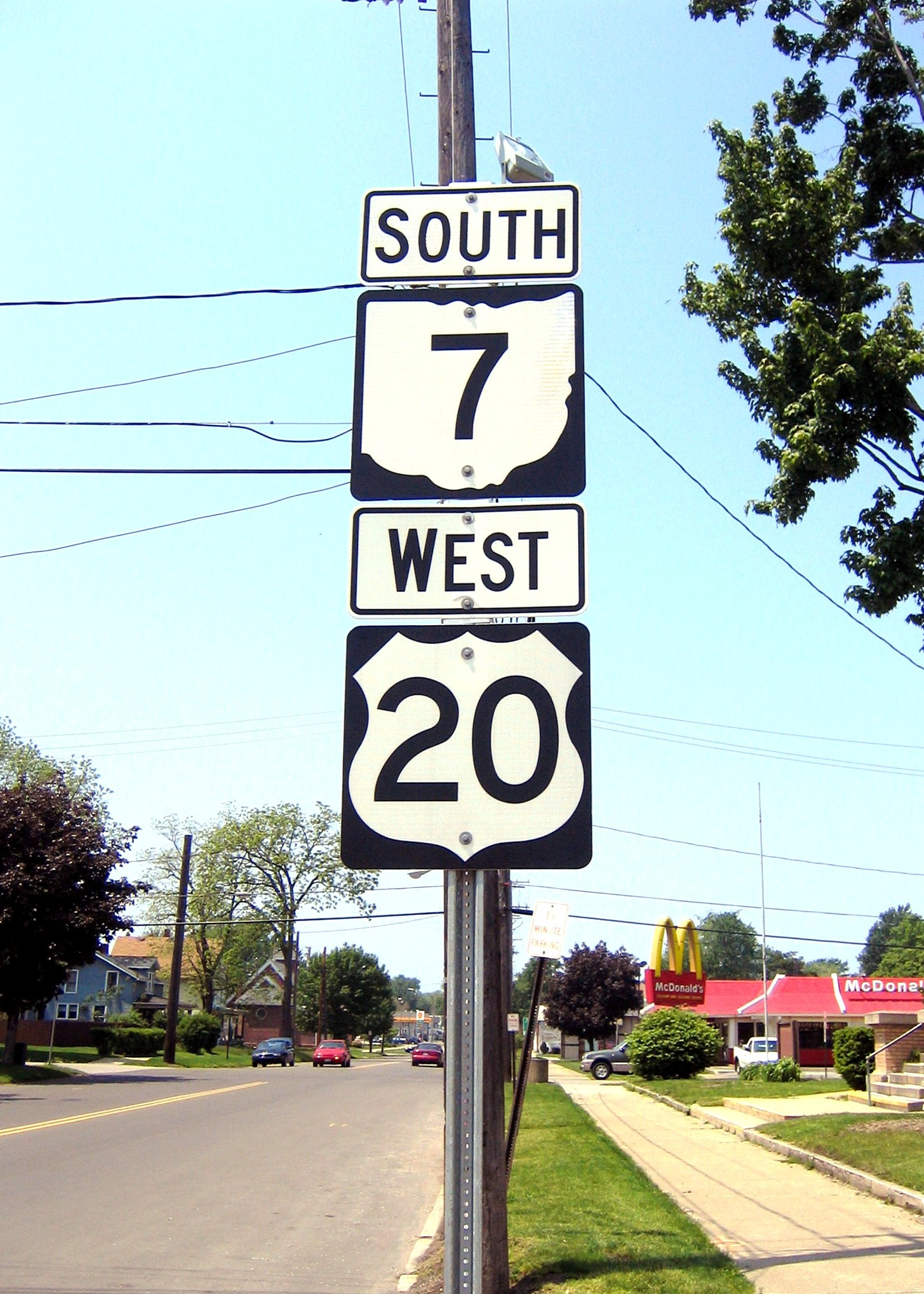
Sign for US 20 along with the sign for State Route 7 in Conneaut, Ohio

US 20 enters Ohio from Indiana just west of Columbia and traverses east through Pioneer and Alvordton to Fayette. It continues east through Oakshade, Assumption and becomes five-lane, non-limited access roadway into Sylvania to Toledo, and then turns south until into the Toledo suburb of Maumee. After Maumee, US 20 crosses Maumee River curving back east becoming 2 lanes through Perrysburg to Woodville, where it becomes a four-lane, non-limited access highway. It bypasses Fremont while concurrent with US 6, State Route 53, and State Route 19, and then travels through the northern edge of Clyde and the downtown area of Bellevue, where it is joined by State Route 18. From there the four-lane highway continues through Monroeville and bypasses Norwalk, then becomes a two-lane highway from there to Oberlin. Continuing east, US 20 traverses through Elyria, North Ridgeville, Westlake, Rocky River, Lakewood and Cleveland, where it goes right through Public Square. East of Cleveland US 20 follows the southern shore of Lake Erie, following Euclid Avenue from Public Square, and traverses Euclid, Wickliffe, where it intersects with I-90, Mentor, Painesville, Madison, Geneva, Ashtabula and crosses into Pennsylvania at Conneaut.

=== Pennsylvania ===
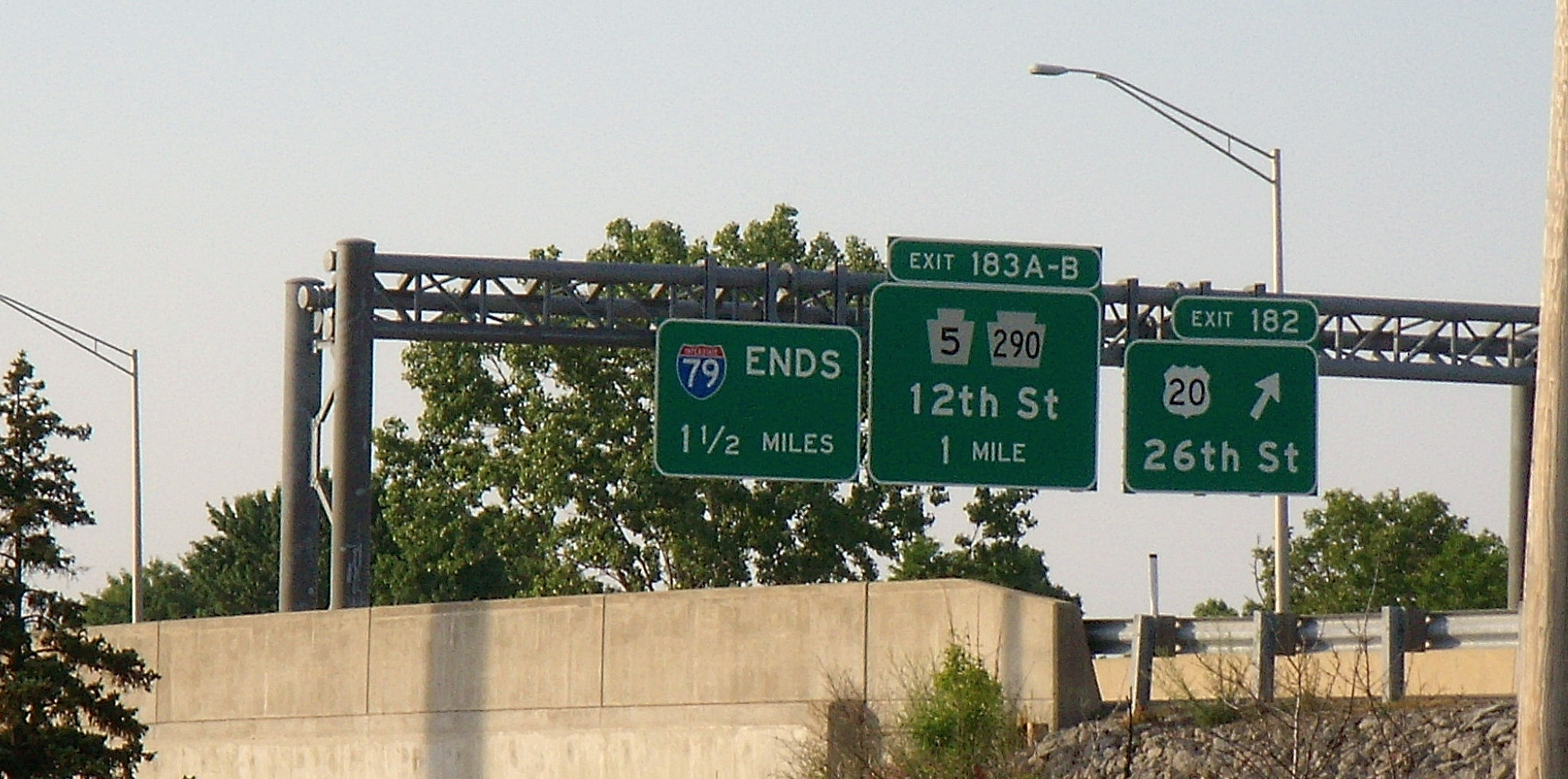
I-79 at US 20 (exit 182) in Erie, Pennsylvania

US 20 runs for nearly 50 miles (80 km) across Erie County, Pennsylvania, most of that time just south of the CSX/Amtrak railroad tracks. US 20 appears as West Ridge Road eastward from the Ohio border through Springfield, Girard, Fairview and Millcreek townships. At the intersection with Pennsylvania Route 832, just outside the Erie city limits, it becomes West 26th Street. After it reaches city center at the intersection with State Street, it becomes East 26th Street. It turns sharply northward as Broad Street at the Bayfront Connector, then turns east again as Buffalo Road through Wesleyville and Harborcreek Township. Buffalo Road turns sharply northward at the town of Harborcreek. US 20 intersects with Pennsylvania Route 955 and resumes its eastward journey. At North East Township, US 20 becomes West Main Road. Within the town limits, it becomes West Main Street until it reaches the town center at its intersection with Pennsylvania Route 89, where it becomes East Main Street. Outside the town limits it becomes East Main Road until it reaches Pennsylvania's border with New York.

=== New York ===
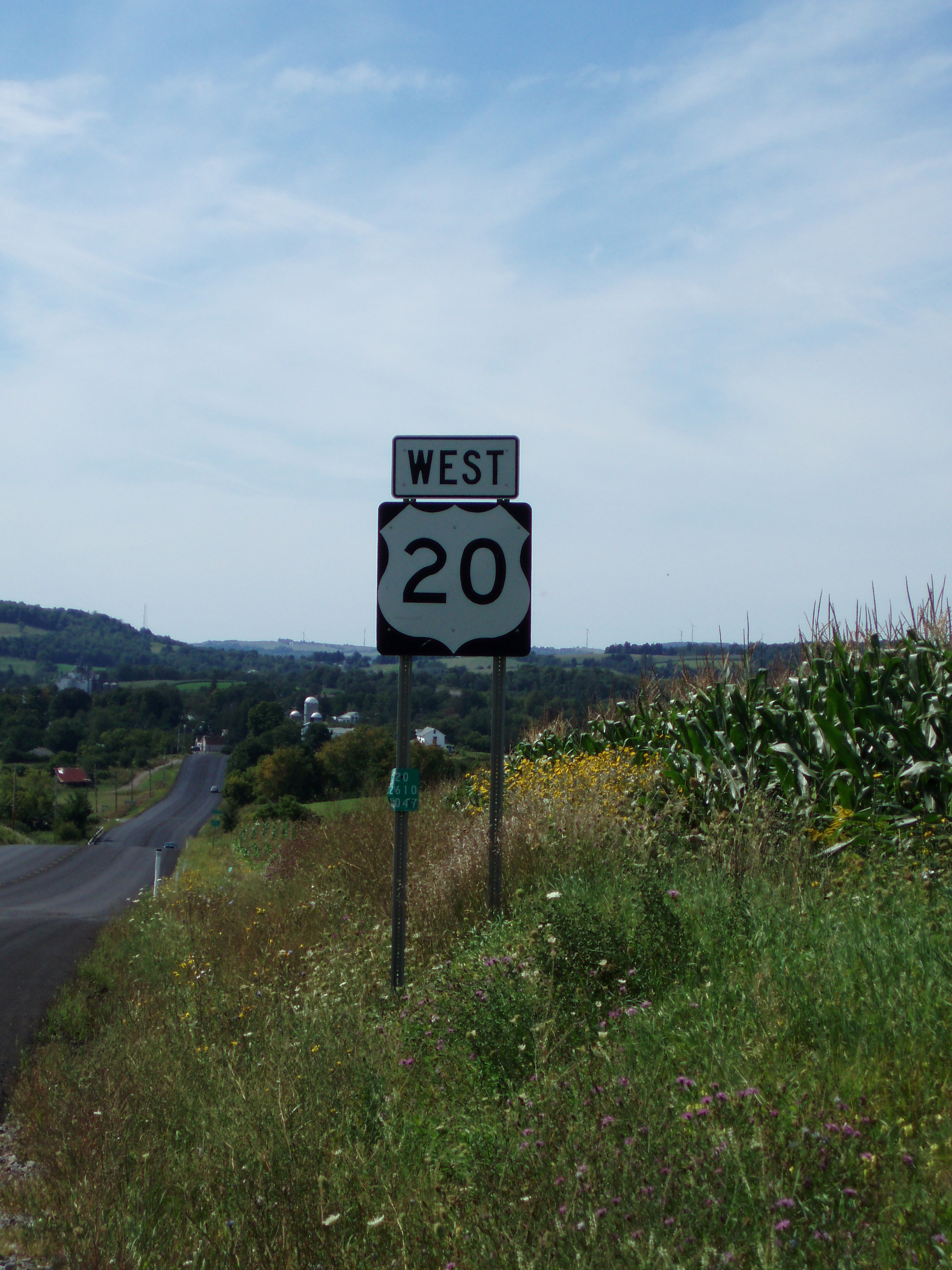
US 20 marker, east of Sangerfield, New York

In New York, US 20 runs roughly parallel to the New York State Thruway (I-90) throughout the state. The route runs concurrently with New York State Route 5 twice, with the second overlap extending 68 miles (109 km) across Western and Central New York from Avon to Auburn running along the top of the Finger Lakes crossing Canandaigua and Seneca Falls along the way. US 20 runs across the rural Cherry Valley Turnpike between Skaneateles and Albany. US 20 was also known as the Boston-Buffalo highway prior to the construction of the New York Thruway and Massachusetts Turnpike.

=== Massachusetts ===
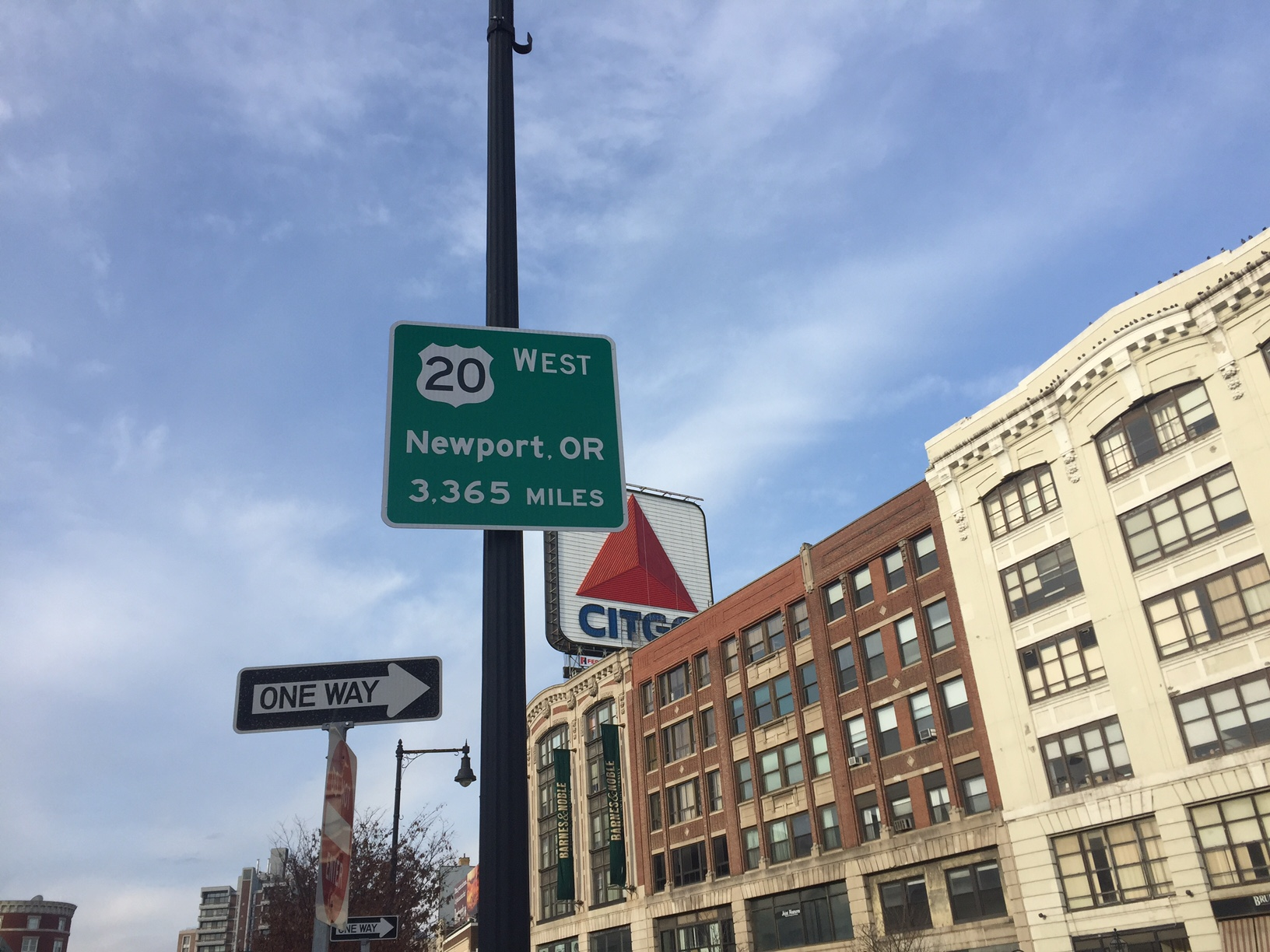
Sign for Route 20 at Kenmore Square, near the Boston Citgo sign

In Massachusetts, US 20 runs roughly parallel to I-90 Mass Pike, intersecting it directly at exit 10 and indirectly at exit 94.

In part of Berkshire County, US 20 runs north–south as it runs concurrently with US 7. It is known as the "Jacob's Ladder Trail" as it crosses the Berkshire Hills between Lee in Berkshire County and Chester in Hampden County. From Chester to Westfield, US 20 and the Boston and Albany Railroad follow the Westfield River down to the broad valley of the Connecticut River.

In Springfield, US 20 runs concurrently with I-291 between Plainfield Street and Page Boulevard; it follows Boston Road as it leaves Springfield and travels through the town of Wilbraham, eventually becoming Main Street in Palmer.

In Shrewsbury, US 20 is called "Hartford Turnpike". In Northborough, and Worcester it is called "Southwest Cutoff", until it merges with the original Boston Post Road in Northborough (Southwest Cutoff and West Main Street). Southwest Cutoff was created at the turn of the century to bypass truck traffic around Shrewsbury center as well as connecting to the Boston and Worcester Turnpike.

In parts of eastern Massachusetts, US 20 follows the route of the old Boston Post Road and passes by Longfellow's Wayside Inn, in Sudbury, the oldest continually operated Inn in America. In 1926, after engineers determined that heavy truck traffic on the Boston Post Road was damaging the foundations of the Inn, Henry Ford, then owner and proprietor, ordered the construction of the mile-and-a-half-long Route 20 bypass. Upon its completion on December 11, 1928, he sold it to the Commonwealth of Massachusetts for $1 and never cashed the check. According to the Boston Herald the by-pass cost Ford $288,000, equivalent to roughly $4.7 million in 2021. The original route of US 20 is now called Wayside Inn Road.

US 20 continues from Sudbury through Wayland, Weston, Waltham, Watertown and then into Boston through Allston and Fenway–Kenmore. U.S. Route 20's official eastern terminus is in Kenmore Square at the intersection of Commonwealth Avenue, Beacon Street, and Brookline Avenue, where the alignment becomes Massachusetts Route 2. Route 2 continues for a short distance where it terminates at Massachusetts Route 28.

== History ==

Before the U.S. Highway System, the route in New England and New York was designated as New England Interstate Route 5 (NE-5), part of the New England Interstate Route system that existed between 1922 and 1927. Around 1923, from Springfield to Pittsfield, NE-5 was known as "Jacob's Ladder", and from Boston to Albany, the "Hubway". When US 20 was first commissioned, it took over the entirety of NE-5.

=== Historic termini ===
Until 1940, the western endpoint of US 20 was the east entrance to Yellowstone National Park.

=== Historic routes ===
Between Fort Dodge, Iowa, and Dubuque, Iowa, the route has been widened to four lanes, the last link of this completed in 2003. Much of the old route is a few miles north of the present route except between I-35 and Waterloo. There, the old route is farther north, going through Iowa Falls, Aplington, and the north side of Cedar Falls along what is now Iowa Highway 57.

From just west of South Bend, Indiana, to the St. Joseph – Elkhart county line, the old route of US 20 through St. Joseph County is now Business US 20. In Elkhart County, its old route is now classified as a county road and is simply called Old US 20. The St. Joseph Valley Parkway is the present route of US 20 in the South Bend – Elkhart Area.

From 1930 to 1933, US 20 followed what are now Massachusetts Route 67 and Massachusetts Route 9 from Worcester to Palmer via Shrewsbury and Northborough.

The 1953 Massachusetts Department of Public Works Master Plan would have relocated US 20 between Palmer, Massachusetts and either West Springfield, Massachusetts or Westfield, Massachusetts along the right-of-way now used by the Massachusetts Turnpike, but this was never implemented.

Until 1970–72, US 20 followed an old route through downtown Springfield—Boston Road and State Street—crossing the Connecticut River via the older Memorial Bridge (now Massachusetts Route 147). The construction of I-291 prompted a change. US 20 now crosses from West Springfield at the North End Bridge, and is co-signed with I-291 until Page Boulevard, where it heads back to Boston Road via the former route of 20A.

In 2012, the Historic US Route 20 Association was formed to identify, promote and preserve the history of the route and original alignments that were once signed "Route 20" from Boston to Newport.

=== Historic names ===
- The portion of US 20 eastward from Illinois generally follows the path of the Yellowstone Trail.
- In Massachusetts, US 20 follows the Boston Post Road in Wayland and Sudbury.
- In the state of New York, part of US 20 follows the old Cherry Valley Turnpike and is still referred to by that name in some places.
- From Buffalo westward to Cleveland, Ohio, US 20 follows the path of the Buffalo Stage Road.

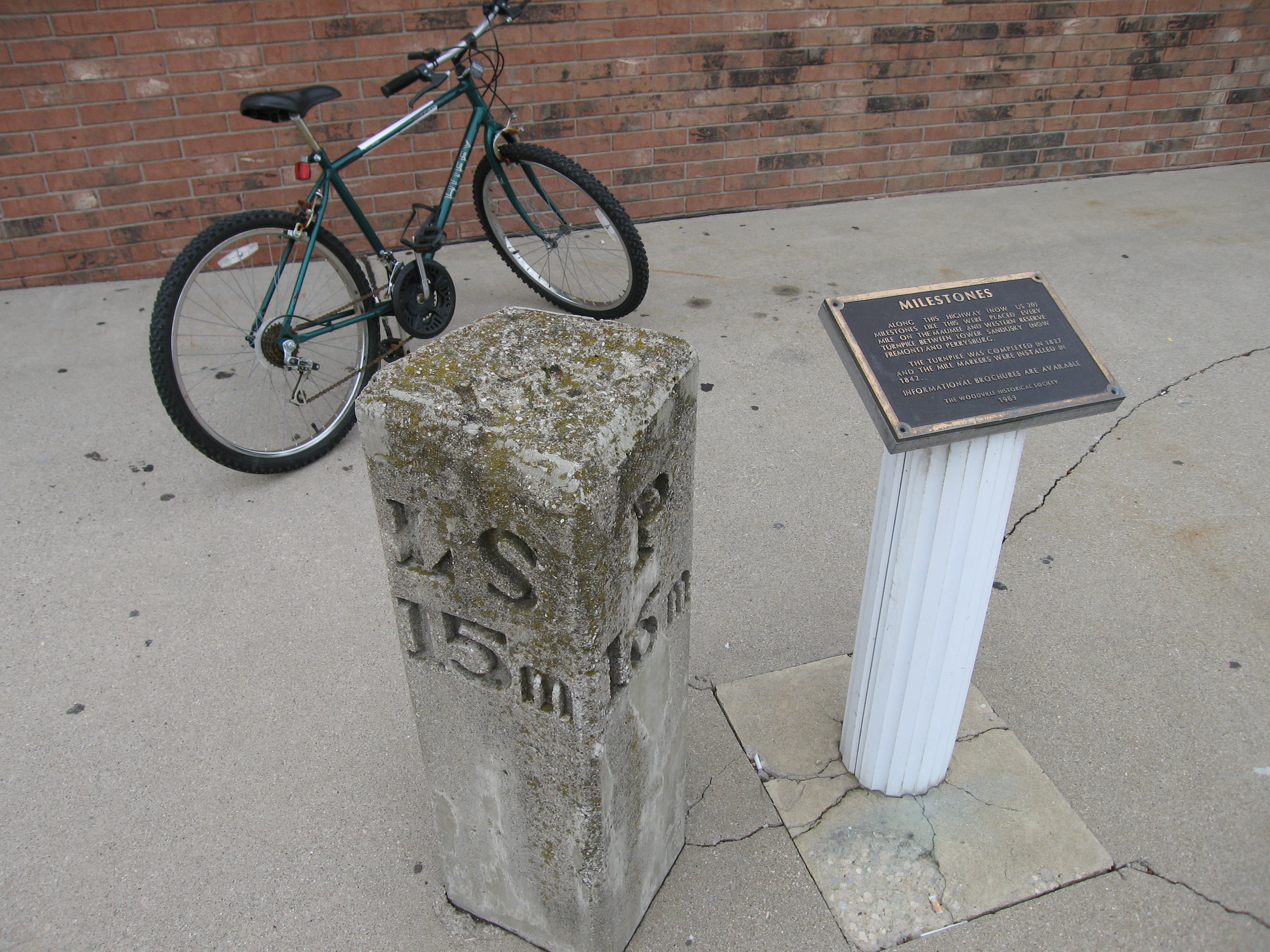
One of the 1842 milestones marking the original Western Reserve and Maumee Turnpike in Woodville, Ohio.

- Between Fremont, Ohio and Perrysburg, Ohio, the road dates back to the late 1830s. It was known then as the Maumee and Western Reserve Road. Nicknamed "Mud Pike" as it cut through the Great Black Swamp, it earned a reputation as "the worst road on the continent" for the mudholes that would trap wagon wheels and slow draft animals. Travelers sometimes would take three days to travel 1 mile (1.6 km). It is still signed as Maumee St. in and near Angola, IN.
- Through western Indiana, US 20 was built as the Dunes Relief Road, as it bypassed the heavily traveled Dunes Highway.
- Northwest of Chicago it is called Ulysses S. Grant Highway.
- On March 25, 2019, Idaho officially labeled their section of US 20 as the Idaho Medal of Honor Highway in honor of 48 Medal of Honor Recipients with strong Idaho attachments.
- On December 17, 2024, President Biden signed into law Senate bill S.1478, designating the entirety of US 20 as the National Medal of Honor Highway.

== Major intersections ==
Western segment

Oregon
US 101 at West Olive Street in Newport
I-5 in Albany
US 97 in Bend
US 395 in Riley. The highways travel concurrently to northeast of Burns.
US 26 in Vale. The highways travel concurrently to Mountain Home, Idaho.
Idaho
US 95 north of Parma. The highways travel concurrently to southeast of Parma.
I-84 / US 30 north of Caldwell. The highways travel concurrently to Caldwell.
I-184 in Boise. The highways travel concurrently through the city.
I-84 / US 30 in Boise. The highways travel concurrently to Mountain Home.
US 26 / US 93 in Carey. US 20/US 26 travel concurrently to northwest of Atomic City. US 20/US 93 travel concurrently to Arco.
I-15 in Idaho Falls. The highways run concurrently for about 1 mile between exits 118 and 119
Montana
US 191 / US 287 at Firehole Avenue in West Yellowstone. The highways travel concurrently to the West Entrance to Yellowstone National Park.

Yellowstone National Park segment (unofficial designation)

US 191 / US 287 travels concurrently from the park's West Entrance to West Thumb.
US 89 north-northwest of West Thumb. The highways travel concurrently to West Thumb.
US 14 / US 16 in West Thumb. The highways travel concurrently to the park's East Entrance.

Eastern segment

Wyoming
US 14 / US 16 at the East Entrance to Yellowstone National Park, southeast of Pahaska Tepee. US 14/US 20 travel concurrently to Greybull. US 16/US 20 travel concurrently to Worland.
US 310 west-northwest of Greybull
US 26 in Shoshoni. The highways travel concurrently to Orin.
I-25 / US 87 at Events Drive on the Casper–Hartrandt city line. I-25/US 20 travel concurrently into Casper proper. US 20/US 87 travel concurrently to Orin.
I-25 in Casper
I-25 southeast of Glenrock. The highways travel concurrently to Orin.
I-25 / US 18 / US 26 / US 87 in Orin. US 18/US 20 travel concurrently to Lusk.
US 85 in Lusk. The highways travel concurrently through the town.
Nebraska
US 385 west of Chadron. The highways travel concurrently to Chadron.
US 83 in Valentine. The highways travel concurrently to south-southeast of Valentine.
US 183 west-northwest of Long Pine. The highways travel concurrently to Bassett.
US 281 in O'Neill. The highways travel concurrently through the city.
US 275 / US 281 in O'Neill. US 20/US 275 travel concurrently to southeast of Inman.
US 81 west-southwest of Randolph
I-129 / US 75 / US 77 in South Sioux City. I-129/US 20 travel concurrently to Sioux City, Iowa. US 20/US 75 travel concurrently to the Woodbury–Concord township line.
Iowa
I-29 / I-129 in Sioux City
US 59 in Holstein. The highways travel concurrently to southeast of Holstein.
US 71 in Boyer Valley Township.
US 169 in Elkhorn Township
US 69 in Liberty Township
I-35 in Rose Grove Township
US 65 in Ellis Township
US 63 in Waterloo
I-380 / US 218 in Waterloo. I-380/US 20 travel concurrently to Poyner Township.
US 52 in Dyersville. The highway travels concurrently to Dubuque.
US 61 / US 151 in Dubuque
Illinois
I-39 / US 51 in Rockford. The highways travel concurrently to Cherry Valley.
I-90 north-northeast of Hampshire
I-355 in Addison
I-290 in Elmhurst. The highways travel concurrently through the city.
US 12 / US 45 on the Stone Park-Melrose Park city line. US 12/US 20 travel concurrently to East Chicago, Indiana. US 20/US 45 travel concurrently to west of the Palos Hills-Hickory Hills city line.
I-290 on the Bellwood-Hillside-Westchester city line
US 34 in La Grange
I-55 on the Countryside-Hodgkins city line
I-294 in Willow Springs
I-294 on the Hickory Hills-Bridgeview city line
US 41 in Chicago. The highways travel concurrently to Whiting.
Indiana
I-90 northwest of Whiting
US 12 on the Hammond-Gary city line. The highways travel concurrently into Gary proper.
I-65 in Gary
I-90 in Gary
I-94 in Burns Harbor
US 421 in Michigan City
I-94 east-southeast of Michigan City
US 35 east-southeast of Michigan City
US 31 in South Bend. The highways travel concurrently through the city.
US 33 in Elkhart
I-69 in Angola
Ohio
US 127 in Mill Creek Township. The highways travel concurrently to Gorham Township.
I-475 / US 23 in Sylvania
I-80 / I-90 in Maumee
US 24 in Maumee
I-75 / US 23 in Perrysburg. US 20/US 23 travel concurrently to the Troy-Woodville township line.
US 6 in Sandusky Township. The highways travel concurrently to Fremont.
US 250 in Norwalk
US 6 in Lakewood. The highways travel concurrently to Cleveland.
US 6 / US 42 / US 322 / US 422 in Cleveland. US 20/US 422 travel concurrently for one block.
US 6 in East Cleveland. The highways travel concurrently to Euclid.
I-90 on the Euclid-Wickliffe city line
Pennsylvania
US 6N in Springfield Township
I-79 in Erie
US 19 in Erie
I-90 east-northeast of North East
New York
I-90 in Hanover
I-390 east of Avon
I-81 south-southwest of LaFayette
US 11 south of LaFayette
I-87 in McKownville
US 9W in Albany
US 9 in Albany. The highways travel concurrently to Schodack.
US 4 in East Greenbush
I-90 in Schodack
Massachusetts
US 7 in Pittsfield. The highways travel concurrently to Lenox.
I-90 in Lee
US 202 in Westfield. The highways travel concurrently through the city.
US 5 in West Springfield
I-91 in Springfield
I-291 in Springfield. The highways travel concurrently through the city.
I-84 in Sturbridge
I-395 / I-290 in Auburn
I-495 in Marlborough
I-95 in Waltham
Route 2 in Boston

== See also ==
- Special routes of U.S. Route 20
- Massachusetts Route 20A
- U.S. Route 20A in New York
- U.S. Route 20A in Ohio
- U.S. Route 20 Business—Sioux City, Iowa; also passes through South Sioux City, Nebraska
- U.S. Route 20 Business—Fort Dodge, Iowa
- U.S. Route 120, became Pennsylvania Route 120 in 1967
- U.S. Route 220
- U.S. Route 320 (now decommissioned, was part of the old Route 26)
- U.S. Route 420 (part of U.S. Route 14 Alternate)
