= Iowa Highway 471 =

State highway in Iowa, United States

Iowa Highway 471
- Iowa 471 highlighted in red

Route information
- Maintained by Iowa DOT
- Length: 11.160 mi (17.960 km)
- Existed: November 2015–present

Major junctions
- South end: Iowa 175 near Lake View
- North end: US 20 / US 71 near Early

Location
- Country: United States
- State: Iowa
- Counties: Sac

Highway system
- Iowa Primary Highway System; Interstate; US; State; Secondary; Scenic
← Iowa 461	→ I-480

Iowa Highway 471 (Iowa 471) is a state highway that is located entirely within Sac County. It was designated in November 2015 when a 20-mile (32 km) portion of U.S. Highway 71 (US 71) was rerouted over Iowa 196 and onto US 20.

== Route description ==
Iowa 471 begins at an intersection with Iowa 175 halfway between Lake View and Odebolt. The highway heads north and roughly parallels the Boyer River. It goes through Early and ends at an interchange with US 20 and US 71.

== History ==
Iowa 471 was created in 2015 when a 20-mile (32 km) section of US 71 was rerouted in Sac County. In August 2015, the Iowa Department of Transportation petitioned the American Association of State Highway and Transportation Officials to move US 71 between the intersections of Iowa 196 and US 20. US 71 would replace the ten miles (16 km) of Iowa 196 and then overlap US 20 for another ten miles (16 km). The relocation was approved on September 25, 2015.

== Major intersections ==
The entire route is in Sac County.

Location	mi	km	Destinations	Notes
Clinton Township	0.00	0.00	Iowa 175 west – Lake View, Odebolt	
Boyer Valley Township	11.160	17.960	US 20 / US 71 – Fort Dodge, Sioux City	Interchange
1.000 mi = 1.609 km; 1.000 km = 0.621 mi: Concurrency terminus
