= Iowa Highway 196 =

State highway in Iowa, United States

Iowa Highway 196
- Iowa 196 highlighted in red

Route information
- Maintained by Iowa DOT
- Length: 10.136 mi (16.312 km)
- Existed: 1935–2015

Major junctions
- South end: US 71 / Iowa 175 east of Lake View
- North end: US 20 / CR N14 east of Sac City

Location
- Country: United States
- State: Iowa
- Counties: Sac

Highway system
- Iowa Primary Highway System; Interstate; US; State; Secondary; Scenic
← Iowa 192	→ Iowa 202

Iowa Highway 196 (Iowa 196) was a state highway located in Sac County. It began east of Lake View at an intersection with U.S. Route 71 (US 71) and Iowa 175 and ended at US 20 northeast of Sac City. Designated in the 1930s, the route always served as a connection between US 71 and US 20.

== Route description ==
Iowa Highway 196 served as a cutoff between US 71 and US 20. It began at an intersection with US 71 and Iowa 175 east of Lake View. The route headed due north for 7 3/4 miles (12.5 km) through rural Sac County to US 20 east of Sac City. Just before the intersection with old US 20, it crossed Cedar Creek, a tributary of the Raccoon River. It then continued north approximately 2 1/3 miles (3.8 km) to an interchange with the new US 20 expressway. Along US 71 / Iowa 175, Iowa 196 was signed TO US 20, and along US 20, it was signed TO US 71 south. US 71 north was not mentioned because the two routes met near Early.

== History ==
Iowa 196 was designated in 1935 along most of the corridor it used for 80 years. The highway's northern end was in Sac City just over one mile (1.6 km) west of where it is today. Around the same time, US 71, which had lain 1 to 3 miles (1.6 to 4.8 km) to the west of what is now Iowa 196, was moved farther to the west bypassing Sac City entirely. In the early 1950s, the northern end of Iowa 196 was moved east of Sac City, and the routing did not change after that. Prior to the 1950s, Iowa 196 was a gravel road. It was macadamized in the early 1950s, but was fully paved by 1956.

In the early 2010s, US 20 was upgraded to a four-lane expressway north of its former two-lane alignment. Iowa 196 was extended along what was County Road N14 (CR N14) approximately 2 1/3 miles (3.8 km) north to an interchange along the new expressway. In March 2015, the highway was shut down in order to be reconstructed completely. Upon completion of the project, US 71 was rerouted over the new road and Iowa 196 no longer existed.

== Major intersections ==
The entire route was in Sac County.

Location	mi	km	Destinations	Notes
Coon Valley Township	0.000	0.000	US 71 / Iowa 175 – Lake View, Carroll	
Cedar Township	10.136	16.312	US 20 / CR N14 – Fort Dodge, Sioux City	
1.000 mi = 1.609 km; 1.000 km = 0.621 mi
