= Webster City Community School District =

School district in Webster City, Iowa, United States

Coordinates: 42.467773°N 93.821288°W

Location
- Webster City, Iowa Hamilton, Webster and Wright counties United States
- Coordinates: 42.467773, -93.821288

District information
- Type: Local school district
- Grades: K-12
- Established: 1854
- Superintendent: Dr. Mandy Ross
- Schools: 5
- Budget: $28,770,000 (2020-21)
- NCES District ID: 1930630

Students and staff
- Students: 1827 (2022-23)
- Teachers: 123.33 FTE
- Staff: 160.29 FTE
- Student–teacher ratio: 14.81
- Athletic conference: North Central
- District mascot: Lynx
- Colors: Purple and Gold

Other information
- Website: www.webster-city.k12.ia.us

The Webster City Community School District is a public school district headquartered in Webster City, Iowa.

In 2012, the Webster City School District enrolled approximately 1600 students, with an estimated 700 receiving free or reduced lunch, 200 students on IEP's, 100 ELL students and a total staff of 248.

The district is mostly in Hamilton County, and also includes portions of Webster and Wright counties. In addition to Webster City, it serves Blairsburg, Duncombe, Kamrar, and Williams.

== History ==
The school district was established in 1854.

Beginning in the 2015–2016 school year, the Webster City district entered into a whole grade sharing arrangement with the Northeast Hamilton Community School District in which the latter sent secondary students to Webster City. This was done to address an enrollment decrease in Northeast Hamilton. In 2018, the two districts decided to hold an election on whether they should merge. On Tuesday, April 3 the election was held, with 94% of the Northeast Hamilton voters and 99% of Webster City district voters favoring consolidation. On July 1, 2019, the Northeast Hamilton district merged into the Webster City district.

In 2015-16, it expanded with an 11 million dollar bond issue for the construction of the new competition gymnasium.

== Schools ==
- Pleasant View Elementary School (PK - 1st grade)
- Sunset Elementary School (2nd - 4th grades)
- Northeast Hamilton Elementary School (PK - 6th grades)
- Webster City Middle School (5th - 8th grades)
- Webster City High School (9th - 12th grades)

The school district also has an Alternative High School (Hamilton High).

=== Webster City High School ===
==== Athletics ====
The Lynx compete in the North Central Conference in the following sports:

- Cross Country
- Volleyball
- Football
  - 1936 State Champions
- Basketball
- Swimming
- Wrestling
- Track and Field
- Golf
  - Girls' 2000 Class 2A State Champions
- Tennis
- Soccer
- Baseball
- Softball
  - 2-time State Champions (1988, 2001)

== See also ==
- List of school districts in Iowa
- List of high schools in Iowa
