= Blairsburg, Iowa =

- City
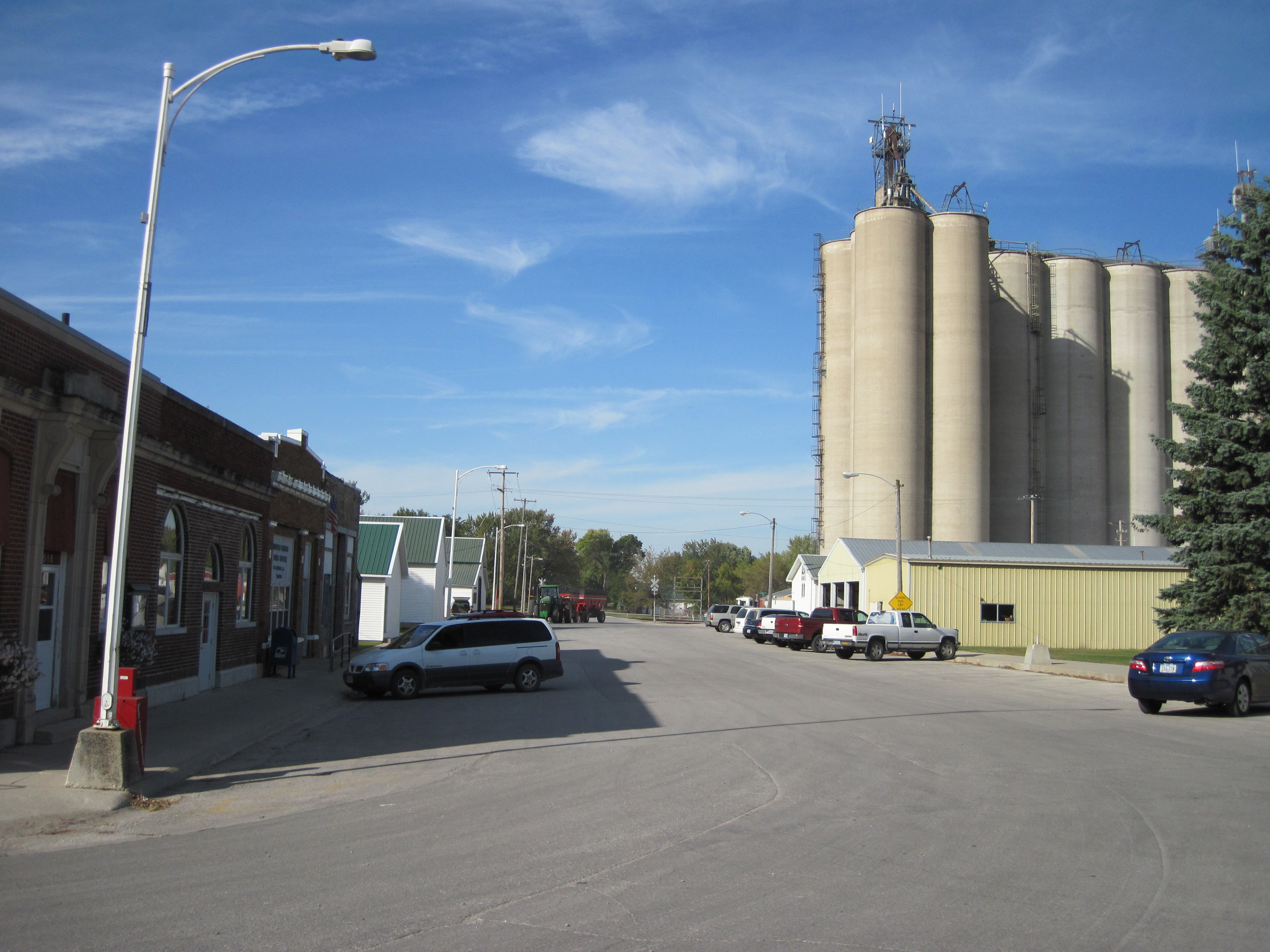
- Street in downtown Blairsburg

- Location of Blairsburg, Iowa
- Coordinates: 42°28′46″N 93°38′30″W
- Country: USA
- State: Iowa
- County: Hamilton

Area
  - Total: 0.64 sq mi (1.66 km^{2})
  - Land: 0.64 sq mi (1.66 km^{2})
  - Water: 0 sq mi (0.00 km^{2})
- Elevation: 1,230 ft (370 m)

Population (2020)
  - Total: 176
  - Density: 274.3/sq mi (105.91/km^{2})
- Time zone: UTC-6 (Central (CST))
  - Summer (DST): UTC-5 (CDT)
- ZIP code: 50034
- Area code: 515
- FIPS code: 19-06760
- GNIS feature ID: 2394185

Blairsburg is a city in Hamilton County, Iowa, United States. The population was 176 at the 2020 census.

== Geography ==
According to the United States Census Bureau, the city has a total area of 0.65 square miles (1.68 km^{2}), all land.

== Demographics ==
Historical populations
| Year | Pop. | ±% |
|---|---|---|
| 1880 | 44 | — |
| 1890 | 88 | +100.0% |
| 1900 | 102 | +15.9% |
| 1910 | 241 | +136.3% |
| 1920 | 272 | +12.9% |
| 1930 | 274 | +0.7% |
| 1940 | 276 | +0.7% |
| 1950 | 257 | −6.9% |
| 1960 | 287 | +11.7% |
| 1970 | 287 | +0.0% |
| 1980 | 288 | +0.3% |
| 1990 | 269 | −6.6% |
| 2000 | 235 | −12.6% |
| 2010 | 215 | −8.5% |
| 2020 | 176 | −18.1% |
Source:"U.S. Census website". United States Census Bureau. and Iowa Data Center; Source: U.S. Decennial Census

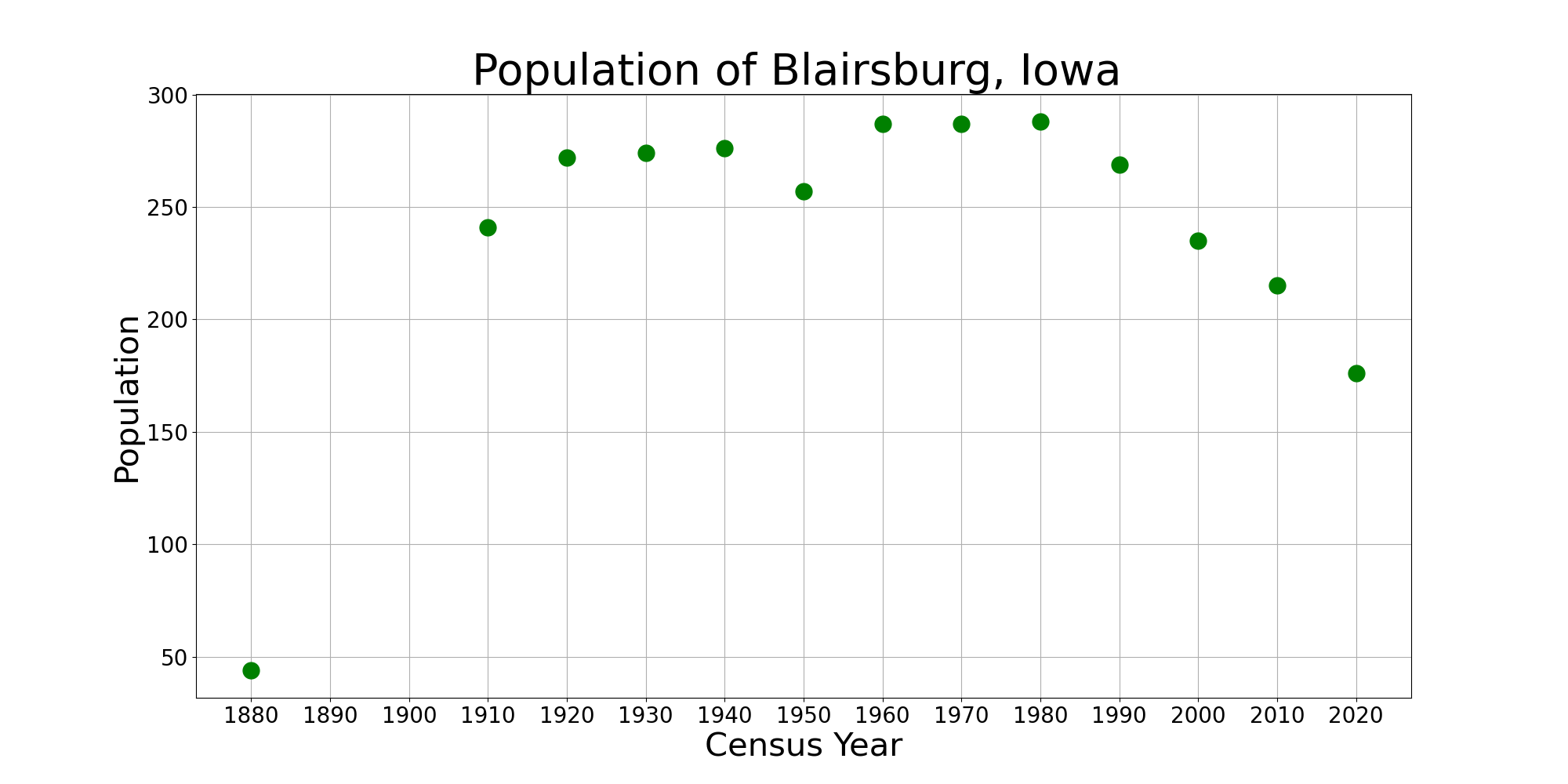
The population of Blairsburg, Iowa from US census data

=== 2020 census ===
As of the census of 2020, there were 176 people, 66 households, and 51 families residing in the city. The population density was 274.3 inhabitants per square mile (105.9/km^{2}). There were 81 housing units at an average density of 126.2 per square mile (48.7/km^{2}). The racial makeup of the city was 93.2% White, 1.1% Black or African American, 0.6% Native American, 0.0% Asian, 0.0% Pacific Islander, 0.6% from other races and 4.5% from two or more races. Hispanic or Latino persons of any race comprised 1.7% of the population.

Of the 66 households, 31.8% of which had children under the age of 18 living with them, 62.1% were married couples living together, 9.1% were cohabitating couples, 21.2% had a female householder with no spouse or partner present and 7.6% had a male householder with no spouse or partner present. 22.7% of all households were non-families. 19.7% of all households were made up of individuals, 13.6% had someone living alone who was 65 years old or older.

The median age in the city was 37.5 years. 30.1% of the residents were under the age of 20; 3.4% were between the ages of 20 and 24; 22.7% were from 25 and 44; 18.2% were from 45 and 64; and 25.6% were 65 years of age or older. The gender makeup of the city was 48.9% male and 51.1% female.

=== 2010 census ===
As of the census of 2010, there were 215 people, 85 households, and 66 families living in the city. The population density was 330.8 inhabitants per square mile (127.7/km^{2}). There were 93 housing units at an average density of 143.1 per square mile (55.3/km^{2}). The racial makeup of the city was 99.5% White and 0.5% from two or more races.

There were 85 households, of which 32.9% had children under the age of 18 living with them, 69.4% were married couples living together, 7.1% had a female householder with no husband present, 1.2% had a male householder with no wife present, and 22.4% were non-families. 21.2% of all households were made up of individuals, and 5.9% had someone living alone who was 65 years of age or older. The average household size was 2.53 and the average family size was 2.91.

The median age in the city was 44.5 years. 26% of residents were under the age of 18; 4.6% were between the ages of 18 and 24; 20% were from 25 to 44; 31.1% were from 45 to 64; and 18.1% were 65 years of age or older. The gender makeup of the city was 48.8% male and 51.2% female.

=== 2000 census ===
As of the census of 2000, there were 235 people, 88 households, and 71 families living in the city. The population density was 364.1 inhabitants per square mile (140.6/km^{2}). There were 92 housing units at an average density of 142.5 per square mile (55.0/km^{2}). The racial makeup of the city was 99.57% White and 0.43% African American.

There were 88 households, out of which 34.1% had children under the age of 18 living with them, 70.5% were married couples living together, 9.1% had a female householder with no husband present, and 18.2% were non-families. 18.2% of all households were made up of individuals, and 10.2% had someone living alone who was 65 years of age or older. The average household size was 2.67 and the average family size was 3.00.

In the city, the population was spread out, with 28.9% under the age of 18, 7.2% from 18 to 24, 22.6% from 25 to 44, 30.2% from 45 to 64, and 11.1% who were 65 years of age or older. The median age was 39 years. For every 100 females, there were 109.8 males. For every 100 females age 18 and over, there were 96.5 males.

The median income for a household in the city was $46,667, and the median income for a family was $49,375. Males had a median income of $30,250 versus $28,750 for females. The per capita income for the city was $17,817. None of the families and 0.9% of the population were living below the poverty line, including no under eighteens and 6.3% of those over 64.

== Education ==
It is within the Webster City Community School District. It was formerly in the Northeast Hamilton Community School District, until it merged into the Webster City district on July 1, 2019.

Northeast Hamilton Elementary School is in Blairsburg.
