= Northeast Hamilton Community School District =

Former school district in Iowa

Location
- Blairsburg, Iowa

Information
- Established: 1970

Northeast Hamilton Community School District was a school district headquartered in Blairsburg, Iowa.

The district was mostly in Hamilton County with portions in Wright County. In addition to Blairsburg, it served Kamrar and Williams.

Circa 2014 its enrollment was 200.

== History ==
Beginning in the 2015–2016 school year the district entered into a whole grade sharing arrangement with the Webster City Community School District in which it sent secondary students to Webster City. This was done to address an enrollment decrease in Northeast Hamilton. In 2018 the two districts decided to hold an election on whether they should merge. On Tuesday, April 3 the election was held, with 94% of the Northeast Hamilton voters and 99% of Webster City district voters favoring consolidation. On July 1, 2019, the Northeast Hamilton district merged into the Webster City district.
