= Eden Township, Sac County, Iowa =

Township in Sac County, Iowa, U.S.

Coordinates: 42°31′04″N 95°12′36″W

Eden Township is a township in Sac County, Iowa, United States.

The township's elevation is listed as 1325 feet above mean sea level.
