= Kamrar, Iowa =

- City
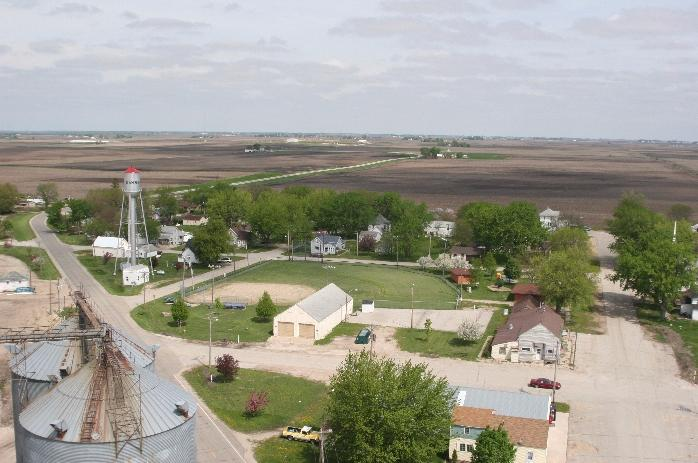
- View of Kamrar

- Location of Kamrar, Iowa
- Coordinates: 42°23′23″N 93°43′40″W
- Country: USA
- State: Iowa
- County: Hamilton

Area
  - Total: 0.85 sq mi (2.21 km^{2})
  - Land: 0.85 sq mi (2.21 km^{2})
  - Water: 0 sq mi (0.00 km^{2})
- Elevation: 1,109 ft (338 m)

Population (2020)
  - Total: 179
  - Density: 210/sq mi (80.9/km^{2})
- Time zone: UTC-6 (Central (CST))
  - Summer (DST): UTC-5 (CDT)
- ZIP code: 50132
- Area code: 515
- FIPS code: 19-40215
- GNIS feature ID: 2395486

Kamrar is a city in Hamilton County, Iowa, United States. The population was 179 at the time of the 2020 census.

== History ==
Kamrar was platted in 1881. The city was named in honor of Judge J. M. Kamrar, a prominent lawyer of the vicinity, who served as an officer of the Chicago & Northwestern Railway Company. J. M. Kamrar resided in Blue Earth, Minnesota in his final years, where he was among the first citizens to own a car. There is a statue of memorial in the town square. A post office has been in operation in Kamrar since 1882.

== Geography ==
According to the United States Census Bureau, the city has a total area of 0.86 square miles (2.23 km^{2}), all land.

== Demographics ==
Historical populations
Year	Pop.	±%
1900	223	—
1910	262	+17.5%
1920	256	−2.3%
1930	286	+11.7%
1940	288	+0.7%
1950	261	−9.4%
1960	268	+2.7%
1970	243	−9.3%
1980	225	−7.4%
1990	203	−9.8%
2000	229	+12.8%
2010	199	−13.1%
2020	179	−10.1%
Source:"U.S. Census website". United States Census Bureau. and Iowa Data Center; Source: U.S. Decennial Census

=== 2020 census ===
As of the census of 2020, there were 179 people, 80 households, and 51 families residing in the city. The population density was 209.5 inhabitants per square mile (80.9/km^{2}). There were 89 housing units at an average density of 104.2 per square mile (40.2/km^{2}). The racial makeup of the city was 94.4% White, 1.1% Black or African American, 0.0% Native American, 0.0% Asian, 0.0% Pacific Islander, 0.6% from other races and 3.9% from two or more races. Hispanic or Latino persons of any race comprised 2.2% of the population.

Of the 80 households, 30.0% of which had children under the age of 18 living with them, 35.0% were married couples living together, 7.5% were cohabitating couples, 23.8% had a female householder with no spouse or partner present and 33.8% had a male householder with no spouse or partner present. 36.2% of all households were non-families. 32.5% of all households were made up of individuals, 8.8% had someone living alone who was 65 years old or older.

The median age in the city was 45.1 years. 26.3% of the residents were under the age of 20; 3.9% were between the ages of 20 and 24; 19.6% were from 25 and 44; 33.5% were from 45 and 64; and 16.8% were 65 years of age or older. The gender makeup of the city was 54.2% male and 45.8% female.

=== 2010 census ===
At the 2010 census there were 199 people in 82 households, including 45 families, in the city. The population density was 231.4 inhabitants per square mile (89.3/km^{2}). There were 95 housing units at an average density of 110.5 per square mile (42.7/km^{2}). The racial makup of the city was 96.5% White, 2.0% Asian, and 1.5% from two or more races.

Of the 82 households 29.3% had children under the age of 18 living with them, 45.1% were married couples living together, 6.1% had a female householder with no husband present, 3.7% had a male householder with no wife present, and 45.1% were non-families. 32.9% of households were one person and 12.2% were one person aged 65 or older. The average household size was 2.43 and the average family size was 3.31.

The median age was 40.5 years. 26.1% of residents were under the age of 18; 3.4% were between the ages of 18 and 24; 26.5% were from 25 to 44; 25% were from 45 to 64; and 18.6% were 65 or older. The gender makeup of the city was 50.8% male and 49.2% female.

=== 2000 census ===
At the 2000 census there were 229 people in 91 households, including 66 families, in the city. The population density was 275.9 inhabitants per square mile (106.5/km^{2}). There were 100 housing units at an average density of 120.5 per square mile (46.5/km^{2}). The racial makup of the city was 95.63% White, 1.31% Native American, 1.31% Asian, and 1.75% from two or more races. Hispanic or Latino of any race were 0.44%.

Of the 91 households 34.1% had children under the age of 18 living with them, 56.0% were married couples living together, 12.1% had a female householder with no husband present, and 26.4% were non-families. 24.2% of households were one person and 13.2% were one person aged 65 or older. The average household size was 2.52 and the average family size was 2.93.

The age distribution was 26.2% under the age of 18, 7.4% from 18 to 24, 29.7% from 25 to 44, 18.8% from 45 to 64, and 17.9% 65 or older. The median age was 37 years. For every 100 females, there were 112.0 males. For every 100 females age 18 and over, there were 108.6 males.

The median household income was $37,188 and the median family income was $41,071. Males had a median income of $30,500 versus $21,964 for females. The per capita income for the city was $15,892. About 3.0% of families and 3.1% of the population were below the poverty line, including none of those under the age of eighteen or sixty five or over.

== Education ==
It is within the Webster City Community School District. It was formerly in the Northeast Hamilton Community School District, until it merged into the Webster City district on July 1, 2019.
