= Williams, Iowa =

- City
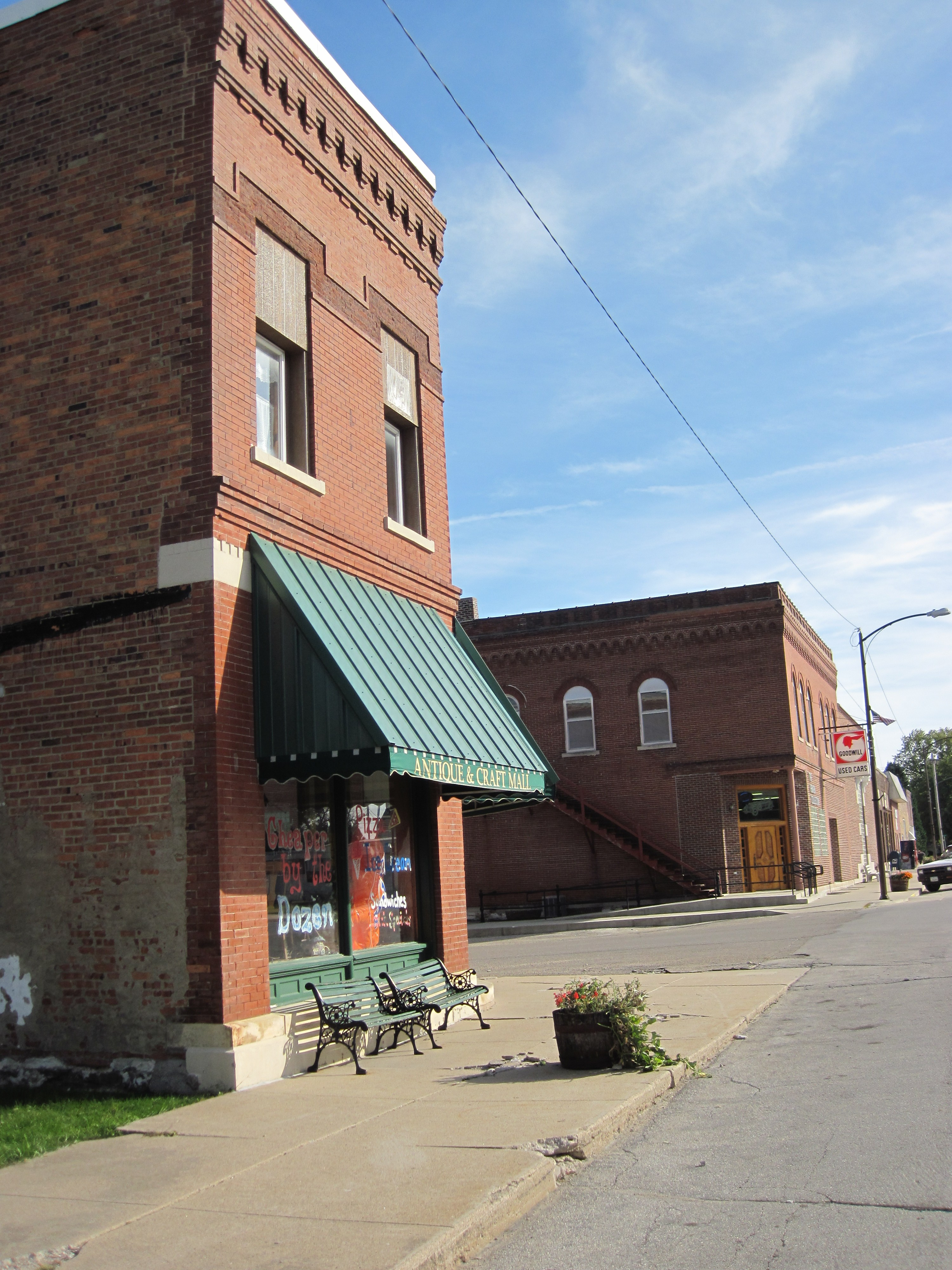
- Street scene in Williams

- Location of Williams, Iowa
- Coordinates: 42°29′45″N 93°32′18″W
- Country: USA
- State: Iowa
- County: Hamilton

Area
  - Total: 0.85 sq mi (2.20 km^{2})
  - Land: 0.85 sq mi (2.20 km^{2})
  - Water: 0 sq mi (0.00 km^{2})
- Elevation: 1,207 ft (368 m)

Population (2020)
  - Total: 307
  - Density: 361.5/sq mi (139.57/km^{2})
- Time zone: UTC-6 (Central (CST))
  - Summer (DST): UTC-5 (CDT)
- ZIP code: 50271
- Area code: 515
- FIPS code: 19-85800
- GNIS feature ID: 2397317
- Website: cityofwilliams.wordpress.com

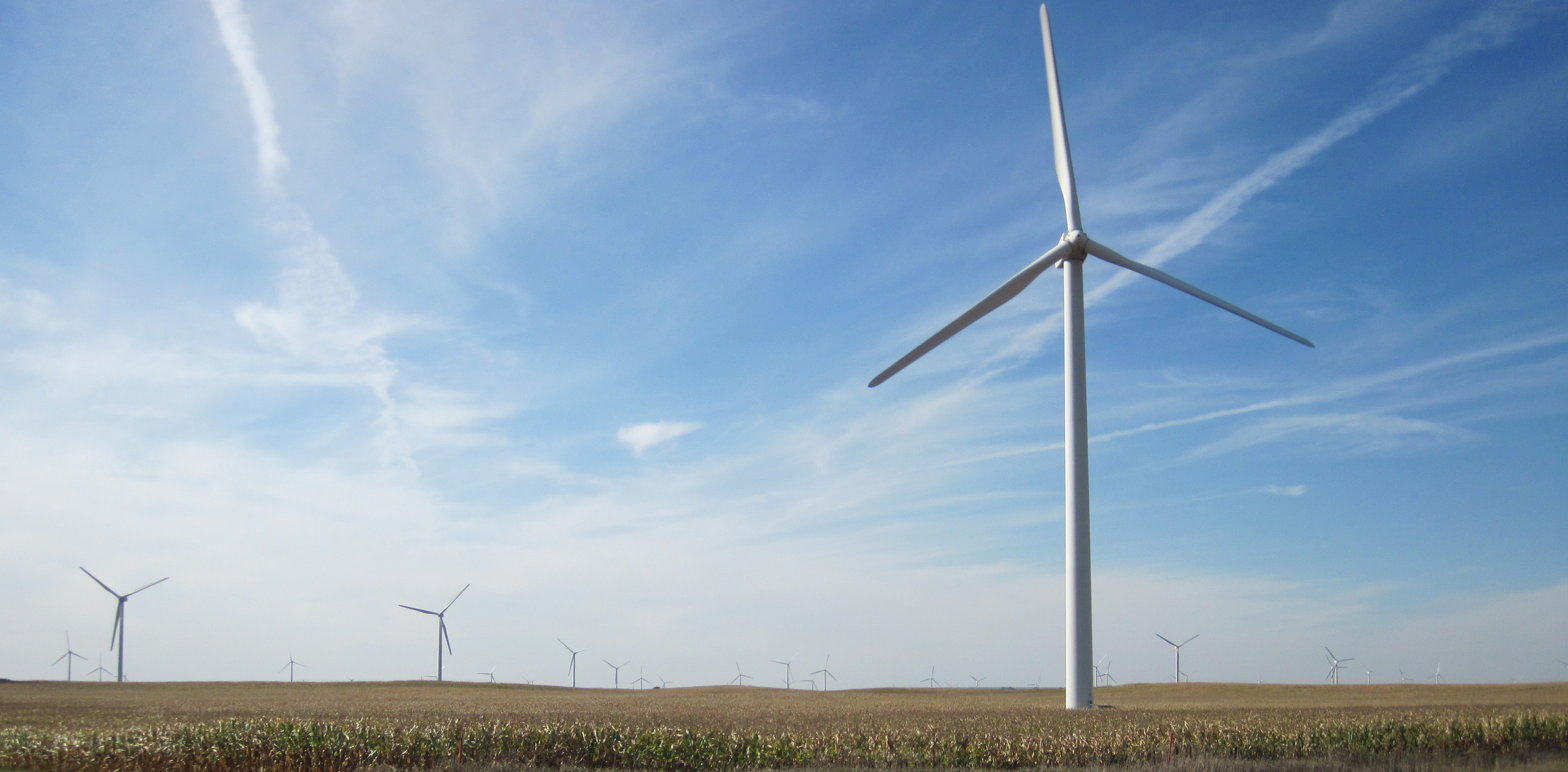
Turbines near Williams

Williams is a city in Hamilton County, Iowa, United States. The population was 307 at the time of the 2020 census. Williams is a regional center of wind power generation.

== Geography ==
According to the United States Census Bureau, the city has a total area of 0.87 square miles (2.25 km^{2}), all land.

== Demographics ==
Historical populations
| Year | Pop. | ±% |
|---|---|---|
| 1880 | 79 | — |
| 1890 | 296 | +274.7% |
| 1900 | 500 | +68.9% |
| 1910 | 457 | −8.6% |
| 1920 | 495 | +8.3% |
| 1930 | 500 | +1.0% |
| 1940 | 489 | −2.2% |
| 1950 | 519 | +6.1% |
| 1960 | 490 | −5.6% |
| 1970 | 456 | −6.9% |
| 1980 | 410 | −10.1% |
| 1990 | 368 | −10.2% |
| 2000 | 427 | +16.0% |
| 2010 | 344 | −19.4% |
| 2020 | 307 | −10.8% |
Source:"U.S. Census website". United States Census Bureau. and Iowa Data Center; Source: U.S. Decennial Census

=== 2020 census ===
As of the 2020 Census, the total population was 307 people. The population density was 352.87 people per square mile, spread over 0.87 miles. Of those 307 people, the median age was 44.3 years old, with 18.3% of the town's population under the age of 18, 64.3% between the ages of 18 and 64, and 17.4% of the population over the age of 65. There were a total of 128 households, with an average of 3.15 people per household.

The racial makeup of the town was 91.85% White, less than 1% African American, 5.53% mixed race, and 5.86% Hispanic.

The average income per capita of Williams was $22,410, which is lower than the state average, and the median household income was $53,750, which is lower than the rest of the state. Only 6.4% of the town's population lives under the poverty line, which is far lower than the rest of the state.

55.6% of the population of the town is identified as currently married.

95.8% of the 2020 population has received a high school degree, which is 3.3 percentage points higher than the rest of the state. Williams has a lower-than-average percentage of the population having received college degrees, with only 13.2% of the town's population having received a bachelor's degree compared to the state average of 30.5%.

4.9% of the town's population were veterans.

=== 2010 census ===
As of the census of 2010, there were 344 people, 158 households, and 96 families living in the city. The population density was 395.4 inhabitants per square mile (152.7/km^{2}). There were 183 housing units at an average density of 210.3 per square mile (81.2/km^{2}). The racial makeup of the city was 98.8% White, 0.3% African American, and 0.9% from two or more races.

There were 158 households, of which 29.1% had children under the age of 18 living with them, 45.6% were married couples living together, 10.1% had a female householder with no husband present, 5.1% had a male householder with no wife present, and 39.2% were non-families. 35.4% of all households were made up of individuals, and 15.9% had someone living alone who was 65 years of age or older. The average household size was 2.18 and the average family size was 2.76.

The median age in the city was 42 years. 22.4% of residents were under the age of 18; 5.4% were between the ages of 18 and 24; 24.9% were from 25 to 44; 27.1% were from 45 to 64; and 20.1% were 65 years of age or older. The gender makeup of the city was 49.7% male and 50.3% female.

=== 2000 census ===
As of the census of 2000, there were 427 people, 185 households, and 123 families living in the city. The population density was 487.0 inhabitants per square mile (188.0/km^{2}). There were 193 housing units at an average density of 220.1 per square mile (85.0/km^{2}). The racial makeup of the city was 98.36% White, 1.64% from other races. Hispanic or Latino of any race were 2.58% of the population.

There were 185 households, out of which 25.4% had children under the age of 18 living with them, 55.7% were married couples living together, 8.1% had a female householder with no husband present, and 33.0% were non-families. 31.4% of all households were made up of individuals, and 18.4% had someone living alone who was 65 years of age or older. The average household size was 2.31 and the average family size was 2.85.

In the city, the population was spread out, with 24.8% under the age of 18, 6.8% from 18 to 24, 27.4% from 25 to 44, 20.6% from 45 to 64, and 20.4% who were 65 years of age or older. The median age was 39 years. For every 100 females, there were 100.5 males. For every 100 females age 18 and over, there were 92.2 males.

The median income for a household in the city was $36,250, and the median income for a family was $41,094. Males had a median income of $27,667 versus $22,188 for females. The per capita income for the city was $16,000. None of the families and 2.2% of the population were living below the poverty line, including no under eighteens and 7.8% of those over 64.

== Education ==
It is within the Webster City Community School District. It was formerly in the Northeast Hamilton Community School District, until it merged into the Webster City district on July 1, 2019.

== Notable people ==
Al McCoy (sportscaster) - Voice of the Phoenix Suns
