= Rose Grove Township, Hamilton County, Iowa =

Township in Iowa, USA

Coordinates: 42°26′N 93°31′W

Rose Grove Township is a township in Hamilton County, Iowa, USA.
