= Early, Iowa =

- City
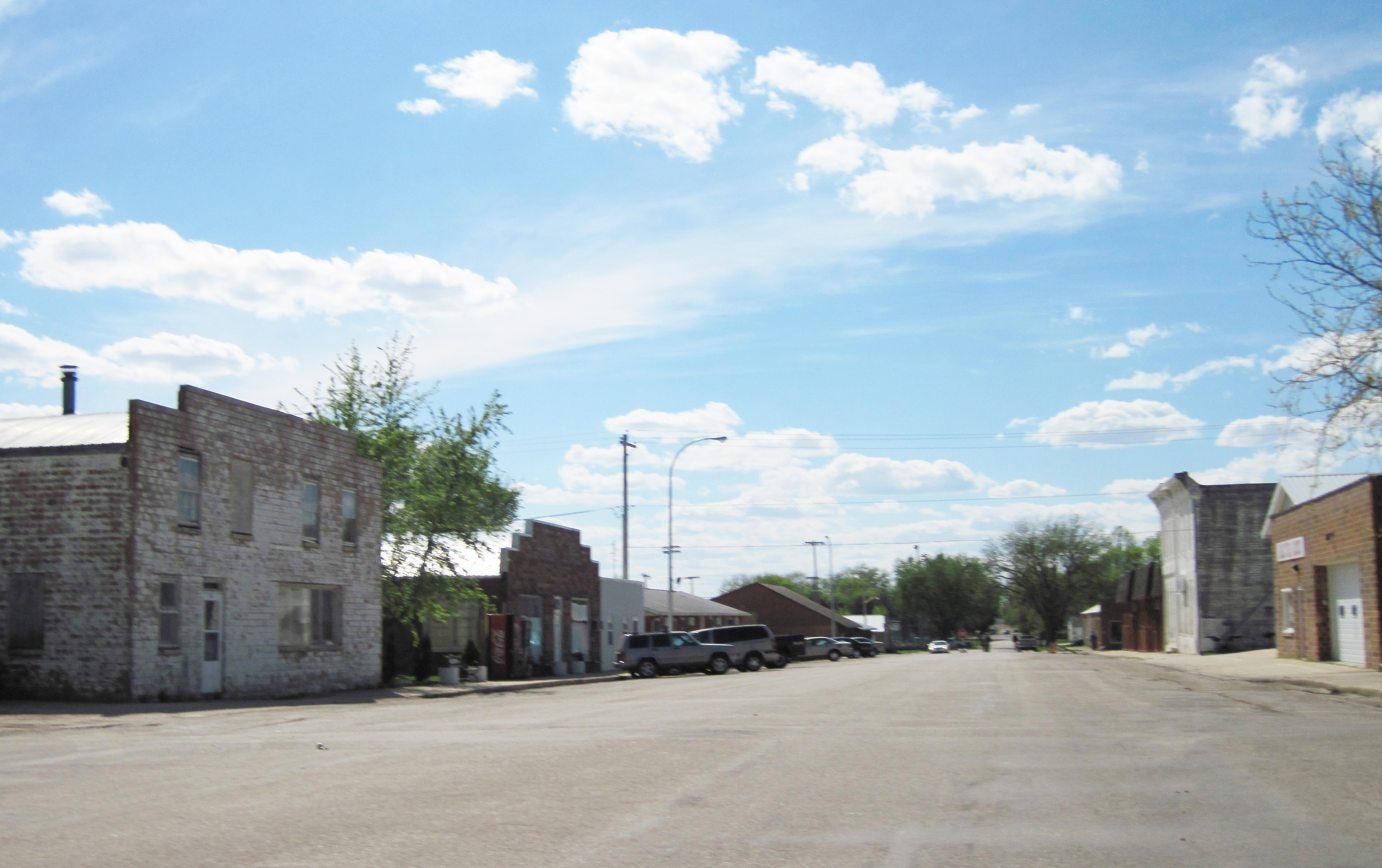
- Street scene in Early
- Motto: "Crossroads Of The Nation"
- Location of Early, Iowa

- Location within Iowa Location within the United States
- Coordinates: 42°27′40″N 95°09′09″W
- Country: United States
- State: Iowa
- County: Sac
- Township: Boyer Valley

Area
  - Total: 0.39 sq mi (1.01 km^{2})
  - Land: 0.39 sq mi (1.01 km^{2})
  - Water: 0 sq mi (0.00 km^{2})
- Elevation: 1,339 ft (408 m)

Population (2020)
  - Total: 587
  - Density: 1,508.0/sq mi (582.26/km^{2})
- Time zone: UTC-6 (Central (CST))
  - Summer (DST): UTC-5 (CDT)
- ZIP code: 50535
- Area code: 712
- FIPS code: 19-23475
- GNIS feature ID: 2394595
- Website: City of Early, Iowa

Early is a city in Sac County, Iowa, United States. The population was 587 at the 2020 census.

== History ==
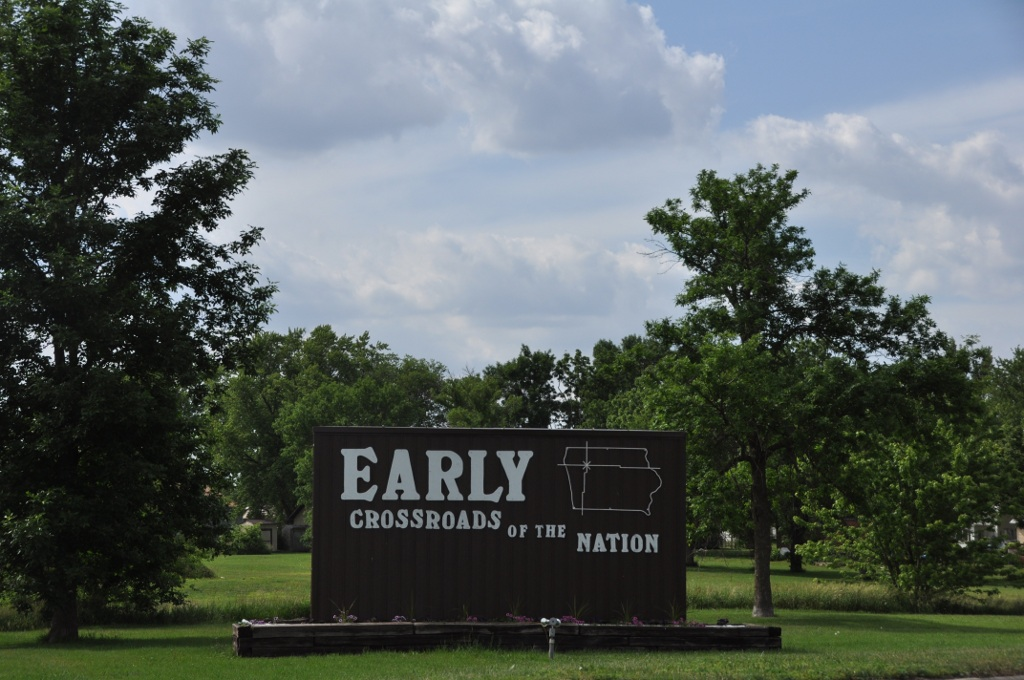
Sign welcoming visitors to Early

Early was incorporated on May 22, 1883, and is named after D.C. Early, a local settler.

== Geography ==
According to the United States Census Bureau, the city has a total area of 0.39 square miles (1.01 km^{2}), all land.

== Demographics ==
Historical populations
Year	Pop.	±%
1890	277	—
1900	579	+109.0%
1910	500	−13.6%
1920	568	+13.6%
1930	632	+11.3%
1940	644	+1.9%
1950	742	+15.2%
1960	824	+11.1%
1970	727	−11.8%
1980	670	−7.8%
1990	649	−3.1%
2000	605	−6.8%
2010	557	−7.9%
2020	587	+5.4%
Source:"U.S. Census website". United States Census Bureau. and Iowa Data Center; Source: U.S. Decennial Census

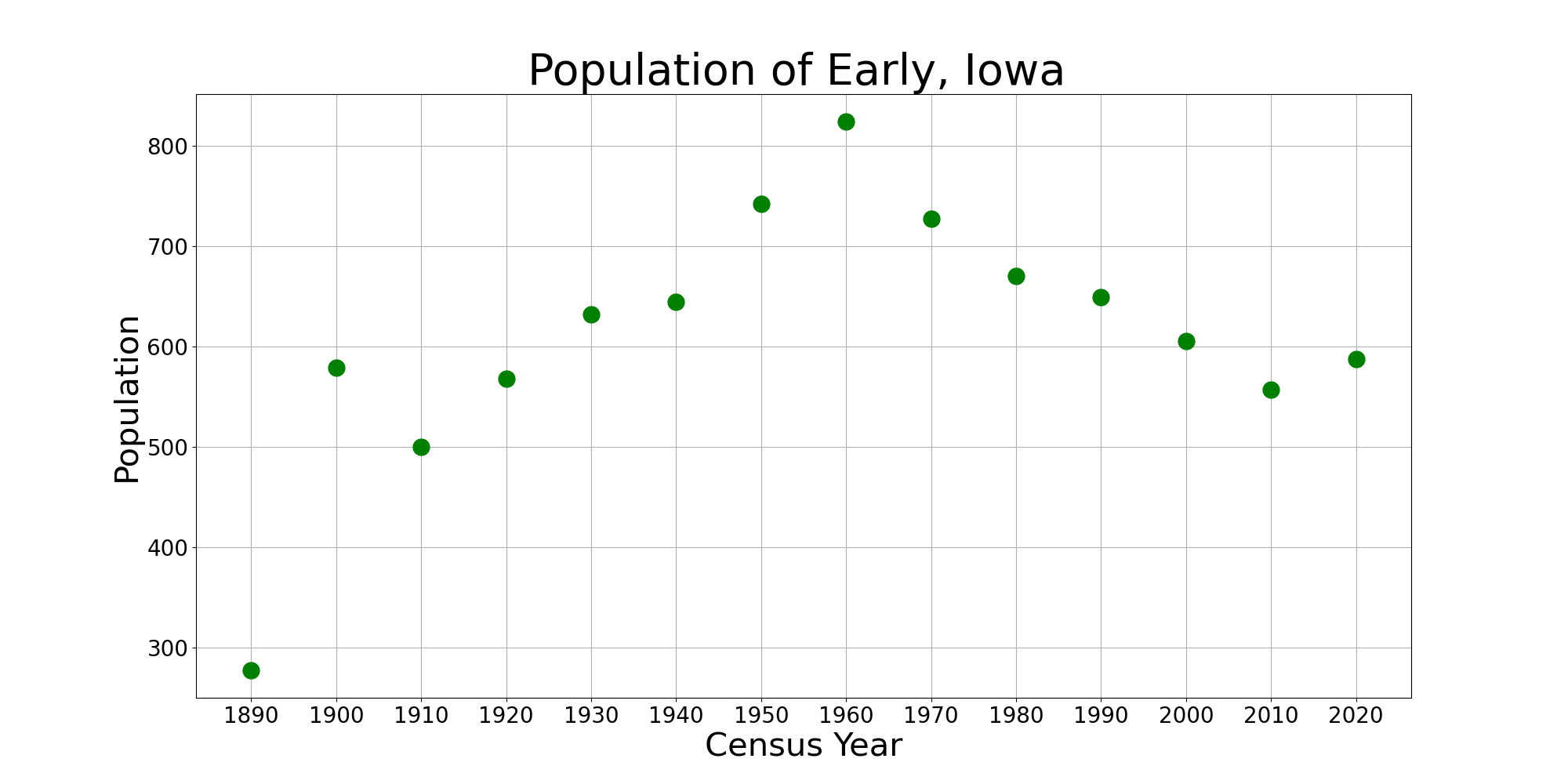
The population of Early, Iowa from US census data

Early's "claim to fame" is that it is the Crossroads of the Nation, because U.S. Highway 71 and U.S. Route 20 intersect there.

=== 2020 census ===
As of the census of 2020, there were 587 people, 247 households, and 157 families residing in the city. The population density was 1,508.0 inhabitants per square mile (582.3/km^{2}). There were 275 housing units at an average density of 706.5 per square mile (272.8/km^{2}). The racial makeup of the city was 89.4% White, 1.9% Black or African American, 0.7% Native American, 0.0% Asian, 0.0% Pacific Islander, 1.9% from other races and 6.1% from two or more races. Hispanic or Latino persons of any race comprised 4.4% of the population.

Of the 247 households, 27.1% of which had children under the age of 18 living with them, 48.2% were married couples living together, 8.9% were cohabitating couples, 24.7% had a female householder with no spouse or partner present and 18.2% had a male householder with no spouse or partner present. 36.4% of all households were non-families. 29.6% of all households were made up of individuals, 11.3% had someone living alone who was 65 years old or older.

The median age in the city was 36.9 years. 25.9% of the residents were under the age of 20; 7.7% were between the ages of 20 and 24; 22.7% were from 25 and 44; 28.3% were from 45 and 64; and 15.5% were 65 years of age or older. The gender makeup of the city was 50.1% male and 49.9% female.

=== 2010 census ===
As of the census of 2010, there were 557 people, 246 households, and 146 families living in the city. The population density was 1,428.2 inhabitants per square mile (551.4/km^{2}). There were 287 housing units at an average density of 735.9 per square mile (284.1/km^{2}). The racial makeup of the city was 93.2% White, 1.4% African American, 0.2% Native American, 0.2% Asian, 0.5% Pacific Islander, 3.1% from other races, and 1.4% from two or more races. Hispanic or Latino of any race were 4.5% of the population.

There were 246 households, of which 27.6% had children under the age of 18 living with them, 47.6% were married couples living together, 9.3% had a female householder with no husband present, 2.4% had a male householder with no wife present, and 40.7% were non-families. 34.6% of all households were made up of individuals, and 13% had someone living alone who was 65 years of age or older. The average household size was 2.26 and the average family size was 2.95.

The median age in the city was 40.9 years. 25.5% of residents were under the age of 18; 6.3% were between the ages of 18 and 24; 24% were from 25 to 44; 27.7% were from 45 to 64; and 16.5% were 65 years of age or older. The gender makeup of the city was 49.4% male and 50.6% female.

=== 2000 census ===
As of the census of 2000, there were 605 people, 258 households, and 166 families living in the city. The population density was 1,532.3 inhabitants per square mile (591.6/km^{2}). There were 293 housing units at an average density of 742.1 per square mile (286.5/km^{2}). The racial makeup of the city was 96.03% White, 0.66% African American, 0.17% Native American, 2.31% from other races, and 0.83% from two or more races. Hispanic or Latino of any race were 4.13% of the population.

There were 258 households, out of which 32.6% had children under the age of 18 living with them, 56.2% were married couples living together, 7.0% had a female householder with no husband present, and 35.3% were non-families. 32.9% of all households were made up of individuals, and 15.5% had someone living alone who was 65 years of age or older. The average household size was 2.34 and the average family size was 2.97.

27.8% were under the age of 18, 8.3% from 18 to 24, 27.1% from 25 to 44, 18.3% from 45 to 64, and 18.5% were 65 years of age or older. The median age was 37 years. For every 100 females, there were 86.2 males. For every 100 females age 18 and over, there were 86.0 males.

The median income for a household in the city was $30,972, and the median income for a family was $40,521. Males had a median income of $27,778 versus $18,929 for females. The per capita income for the city was $14,317. About 8.1% of families and 12.1% of the population were below the poverty line, including 12.0% of those under age 18 and 9.4% of those age 65 or over.

== Education ==
Early is a part of the Schaller-Crestland Community School District. The district formed on July 1, 1993, by the merger of the Schaller Community School District and the Crestland Community School District. Schaller-Crestland's nickname is the Wildcats, and their school colors are black, white, and gold. This district cooperates with the Galva-Holstein Community School District, and the two have the collective name "Ridge View Community School District".

Prior to consolidation with Nemaha, the Early Community School District had been known as the Cardinals, and their school colors were red and black. In 1958, the Early Community School and the Nemaha Community School merged to become the Crestland Community School District. The new district adopted the Cadets as their nickname, and their school colors were black and white. Nemaha had been known as the Bluejays; their school colors were blue and white.

In 2010, Schaller-Crestland began whole grade sharing with Galva-Holstein School district. The elementary schools stayed separated, with students going to Schaller, Galva and Holstein respectively. Grades 6-8 were moved from Galva and Schaller respectively to the Early high school until 2024 when grades K-5 from Schaller were moved to Early. Kindergarten through sixth grades moved to Schaller in 2026 and the Early high school building officially closed. Grades 9-12 remain at Holstein's High School. The two districts share a mascot, the Raptors, and their School Colors are Black, Gold and Orange.

== Song ==
The city is the topic of the song "Early", by folk musician Greg Brown. It appears on his album 44 & 66, released in 1980.

== Murder of Dustin Wehde ==
In August 2011, Tracey Ann Richter was charged with first-degree murder and was convicted by a jury in November 2011. On June 1, 2012, Dateline NBC aired a two-hour episode titled "Twisted", about the 2001 shooting death of Early resident Dustin Wehde. Tracey Richter, a neighbor of Wehde's, was convicted of first-degree murder on November 7, 2011, and sentenced to life in prison without the possibility of parole [Case No. FECR011900]. Richter appealed her conviction. On January 9, 2013, the Iowa Court of Appeals upheld the conviction of Tracey Ann Richter.
