= Cedar Township, Sac County, Iowa =

Township in Sac County, Iowa, U.S.

Coordinates: 42°25′47″N 94°54′55″W

Cedar Township is a township in Sac County, Iowa, United States. Part of Lytton, Iowa is within Cedar Township.

== Geography ==
The township's elevation is listed as 1224 feet above mean sea level. It has a total area of 36.64 square miles.

== History ==
Cedar Township was first settled around 1859.

== Demographics ==
As of the 2010 census, Cedar Township had 230 housing units and a population of 480.

== Education ==
Cedar Township is in the Newell-Fonda Community School District.
