= Boyer Valley Township, Sac County, Iowa =

Township in Sac County, Iowa, U.S.

Coordinates: 42°25′48″N 95°08′51″W

Boyer Valley Township is a township in Sac County, Iowa, United States. Early is contained within Boyer Valley Township.

== Geography ==
The township's elevation is listed as 1316 feet above mean sea level.

It has a total area of 0.39 square miles.

== Demographics ==
As of the 2010 census, Boyer Valley Township had a population of 775 and 380 housing units.

== History ==
Boyer Valley Township was founded in 1871. It was named for the Boyer River. Its first resident was likely William Cory, a homesteader, who settled in the area in 1868. The Chicago and North Western Railway used to run through the township. It was once a prosperous farming town, with a greater population than at present.

== Education ==
Boyer Valley Township is part of the Galva–Holstein Community School District.
