= Iowa Highway 175 =

State highway in Iowa, United States

Iowa Highway 175
- Iowa 175 highlighted in red

Route information
- Maintained by Iowa DOT
- Length: 221.367 mi (356.256 km)

Major junctions
- West end: N-51 west of Onawa
- I-29 at Onawa; Iowa 141 at Mapleton; US 59 at Ida Grove; US 71 near Odebolt; US 169 at Harcourt; US 69 near Jewell; I-35 at Ellsworth; US 65 at Hubbard; Iowa 14 near Grundy Center
- East end: US 63 near Voorhies

Location
- Country: United States
- State: Iowa
- Counties: Monona; Woodbury; Ida; Sac; Calhoun; Webster; Hamilton; Hardin; Grundy; Black Hawk

Highway system
- Iowa Primary Highway System; Interstate; US; State; Secondary; Scenic
| ← Iowa 173 | → Iowa 182 |

Iowa Highway 175 (Iowa 175) is a main east–west route in the northern portion of the state. The highway has a length of 221 miles (356 km). Iowa Highway 175 enters the state by a Missouri River crossing between Decatur, Nebraska and Onawa. The highway continues westward as Nebraska Highway 51. Iowa 175's eastern terminus is at a T intersection with U.S. Highway 63 (US 63) in southwestern Black Hawk County.

Despite Iowa 175's length, it only passes through small communities. The largest city on the route is Onawa, whose 2020 census population was 2,906.

== Route description ==
Iowa Highway 175 begins at the eastern end of the Burt County Missouri River Bridge west of Onawa. At Onawa, it intersects Interstate 29. At Turin, it meets Iowa 37 and turns northeast to follow an alignment which lies next to the Maple River. It continues through Castana and meets Iowa 141 in Mapleton. At Mapleton, Iowa 175 overlaps Iowa 141 through town. This is a wrong-way concurrency, with eastbound Iowa 175 and westbound Iowa 141 routed on one side of the road, and vice versa. It continues northeast from Mapleton through Danbury and Battle Creek and meets US 59 west of Ida Grove. After passing through Ida Grove together with US 59, they separate east of Ida Grove. Iowa 175 passes east through Arthur and at Odebolt, meets Iowa 39. Further east, Iowa 175 meets US 71. Iowa 175 and US 71 run east, then south, then east again concurrently through Lake View and Ulmer before separating at Auburn.

Iowa 175 leaves Auburn going east, then passes through Lake City. After Lake City, Iowa 175 meets Iowa 4. The two highways run concurrently through Lohrville before separating. Iowa 175 then passes through Farnhamville and Gowrie and intersects Iowa 144 before intersecting US 169 at Harcourt. They continue east together before separating before Dayton. After passing through Stratford, Iowa 175 meets Iowa 17 at Stanhope. It leaves Stanhope going east and meets US 69 south of Jewell.

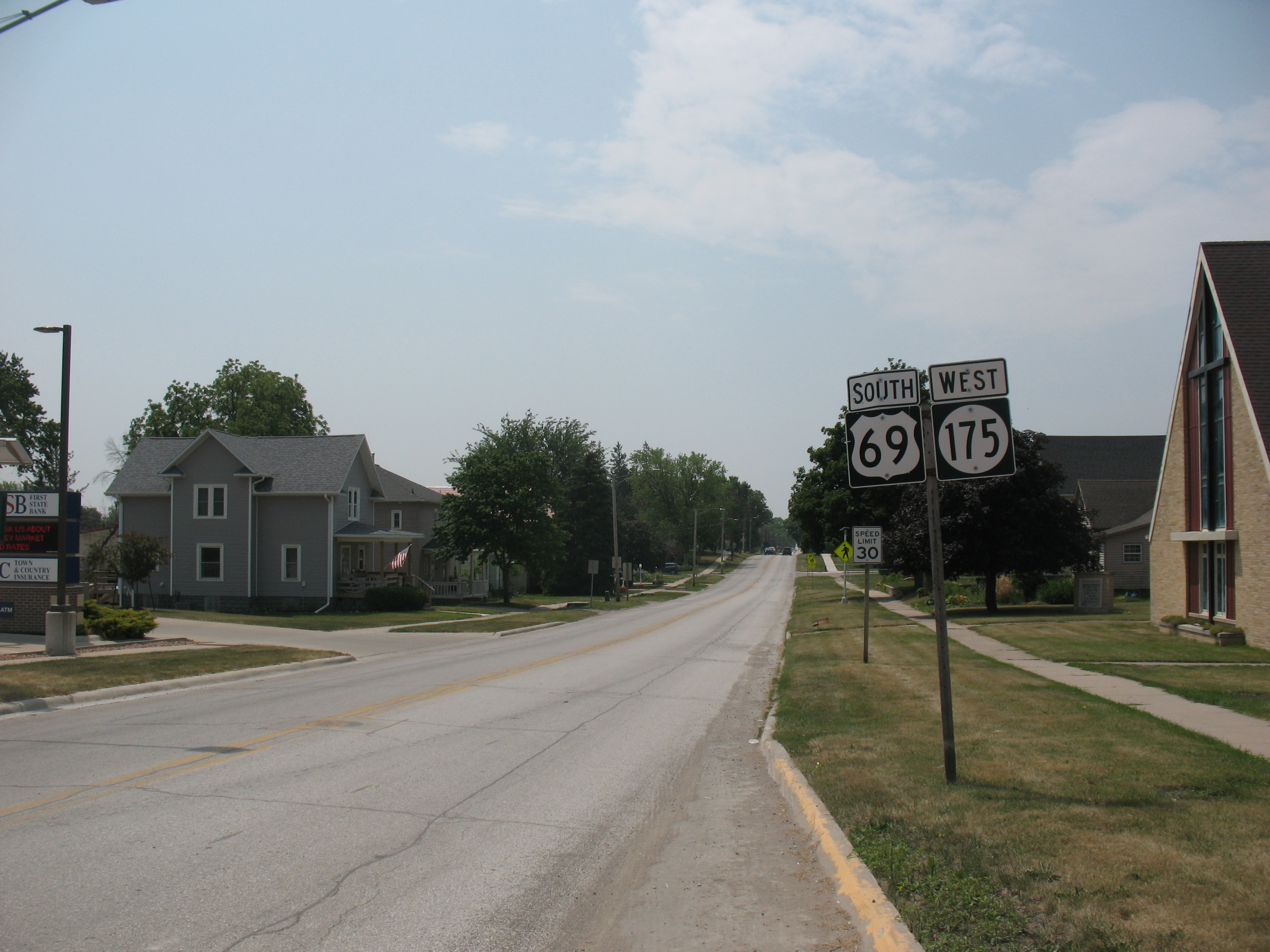
Iowa 175 and US 69 in Jewell

They run together going north into Jewell before Iowa 175 turns east. After passing through Ellsworth, Iowa 175 intersects Interstate 35.

Iowa Highway 175 then continues east of I-35 by passing through Radcliffe before meeting US 65 in Hubbard. Iowa 175 and US 65 then go north, then east, together before separating. Iowa 175 then goes east through Eldora and meets Iowa 14 west of Grundy Center. Iowa 175 continues east with Iowa 14 before separating in Grundy Center. It turns slightly southeasterly while passing through Morrison and Reinbeck, then turns east and ends at US 63 south of Hudson.

== History ==
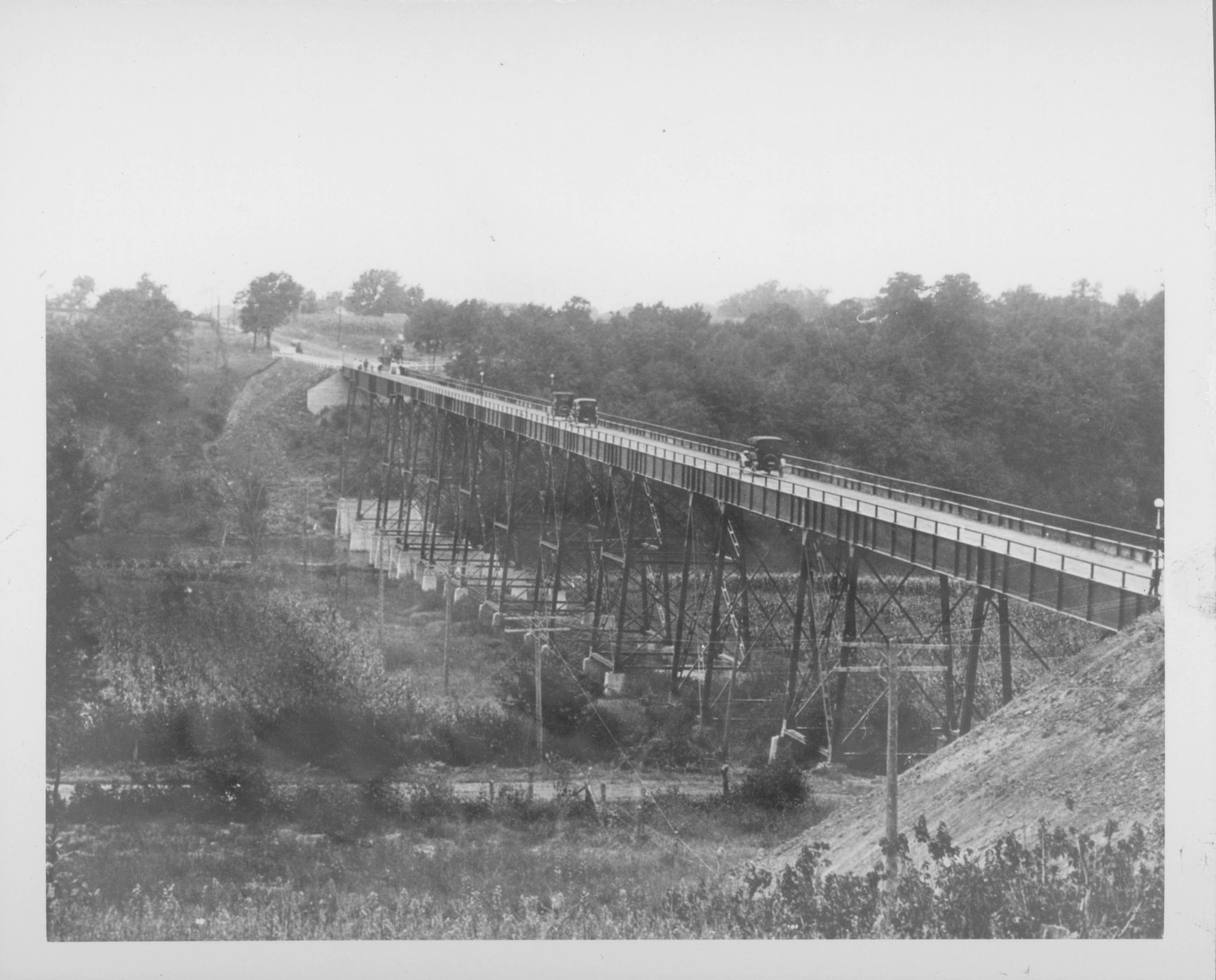
Eldora Viaduct was built over the Iowa River in 1914

Iowa Highway 175 was originally designated in 1930 as a very short spur from US 65 to Hubbard but extended west to Stratford by 1937. Iowa 175 extended west to Auburn in October 1940, replacing Iowa 91, a spur route from Dayton to US 169, Iowa 47, a spur route from US 169 to Farnhamville (which had extended west from Gowrie on December 20, 1938), Iowa 287, a spur route from Farnhamville to Iowa 17 (now Iowa 4), and Iowa 188 (which was renumbered from Iowa 151 in 1938), which went from Iowa 17 to Auburn. In January 1948, Iowa 175 extended west to US 75, replacing Iowa 35 and a duplex with Iowa 37 was created; Iowa 37 would be truncated to Iowa 175 on May 11, 1966. By 1955 Iowa 175 had extended westward to Nebraska, replacing Iowa 165. The final segment of Highway 175 was commissioned in 1969, extending the highway eastward from Hubbard to its present eastern terminus.

== Major intersections ==
| County | Location | mi | km | Destinations | Notes |
|---|---|---|---|---|---|
| Missouri River | | 0.000 | 0.000 | N-51 west – Decatur | Continuation into Nebraska |
| Missouri River | | 0.000 | 0.000 | Burt County Missouri River Bridge; Nebraska–Iowa state line | |
| Monona | Onawa | 6.093 | 9.806 | I-29 – Sioux City, Council Bluffs | I-29 exit 112 |
| Monona | Belvidere Township | 15.624 | 25.144 | Iowa 37 east – Soldier | |
| Monona | Mapleton | 29.294 | 47.144 | Iowa 141 east – Ute | Western end of Iowa 141 overlap |
| Monona | Mapleton | 29.895 | 48.111 | Iowa 141 west – Smithland | Eastern end of Iowa 141 overlap |
| Woodbury | No major junctions | | | | |
| Ida | Corwin Township | 50.418 | 81.140 | US 59 north – Holstein | Western end of US 59 overlap |
| Ida | Corwin Township | 54.068 | 87.014 | US 59 south – Denison | Eastern end of US 59 overlap |
| Sac | Odebolt | 64.476 | 103.764 | Iowa 39 south – Kiron | |
| Sac | Clinton Township | 69.433 | 111.742 | Iowa 471 north – Early | Formerly US 71 |
| Sac | Coon Valley Township | 79.135 | 127.355 | US 71 north – Sac City | Western end of US 71 overlap; formerly Iowa 196 |
| Sac | Auburn | 87.107 | 140.185 | US 71 south – Carroll | Eastern end of US 71 overlap |
| Calhoun | Calhoun Township | 99.179 | 159.613 | Iowa 4 north – Rockwell City | Western end of Iowa 4 overlap |
| Calhoun | Reading Township | 108.060 | 173.906 | Iowa 4 south – Jefferson | Eastern end of Iowa 4 overlap |
| Webster | Lost Grove Township | 119.976 | 193.083 | Iowa 144 south – Paton | |
| Webster | Harcourt | 122.974 | 197.907 | US 169 north – Fort Dodge | Western end of US 169 overlap |
| Webster | Dayton Township | 126.988 | 204.367 | US 169 south – Ogden | Eastern end of US 169 overlap |
| Hamilton | Clear Lake Township | 145.174 | 233.635 | Iowa 17 south to US 30 | Western end of Iowa 17 overlap |
| Hamilton | Stanhope | 146.169 | 235.236 | Iowa 17 north – Stanhope | Eastern end of Iowa 17 overlap |
| Hamilton | Ellsworth Township | 154.162 | 248.100 | US 69 south – Ames | Western end of US 69 overlap |
| Hamilton | Ellsworth | 155.577 | 250.377 | US 69 north – Blairsburg | Eastern end of US 69 overlap |
| Hamilton | Lincoln Township | 159.577 | 256.814 | I-35 – Des Moines, Minneapolis | I-35 exit 133 |
| Hardin | Hubbard | 172.950 | 278.336 | US 65 south – Des Moines | Western end of US 65 overlap |
| Hardin | Tipton Township | 179.950 | 289.601 | US 65 north – Iowa Falls | Eastern end of US 65 overlap |
| Grundy | Melrose Township | 197.593 | 317.995 | Iowa 14 south – Marshalltown | Western end of Iowa 14 overlap |
| Grundy | Grundy Center | 204.867 | 329.701 | Iowa 14 north – Parkersburg | Eastern end of Iowa 14 overlap |
| Black Hawk | Lincoln Township | 221.367 | 356.256 | US 63 (Hudson Road) – Hudson, Waterloo, Tama | |
1.000 mi = 1.609 km; 1.000 km = 0.621 mi: Concurrency terminus
