= Stephen Decatur (disambiguation) =

Stephen Decatur (1779–1820) was an American naval commodore.

Stephen Decatur may also refer to:

- Stephen Decatur Sr. (1752–1808), American naval captain in the Revolutionary War and afterwards
- Stephen Decatur Bross or Stephen A. Decatur (1813–1888), pioneer settler in Nebraska and Colorado

== See also ==
- Stephen Decatur High School (disambiguation)
- Maryland Route 611, also called Stephen Decatur Highway, highway in Maryland
- Stephen Decatur Middle School, Maryland
