= Nebraska Highway 51 =

State highway in Nebraska, U.S.

State Highway 51

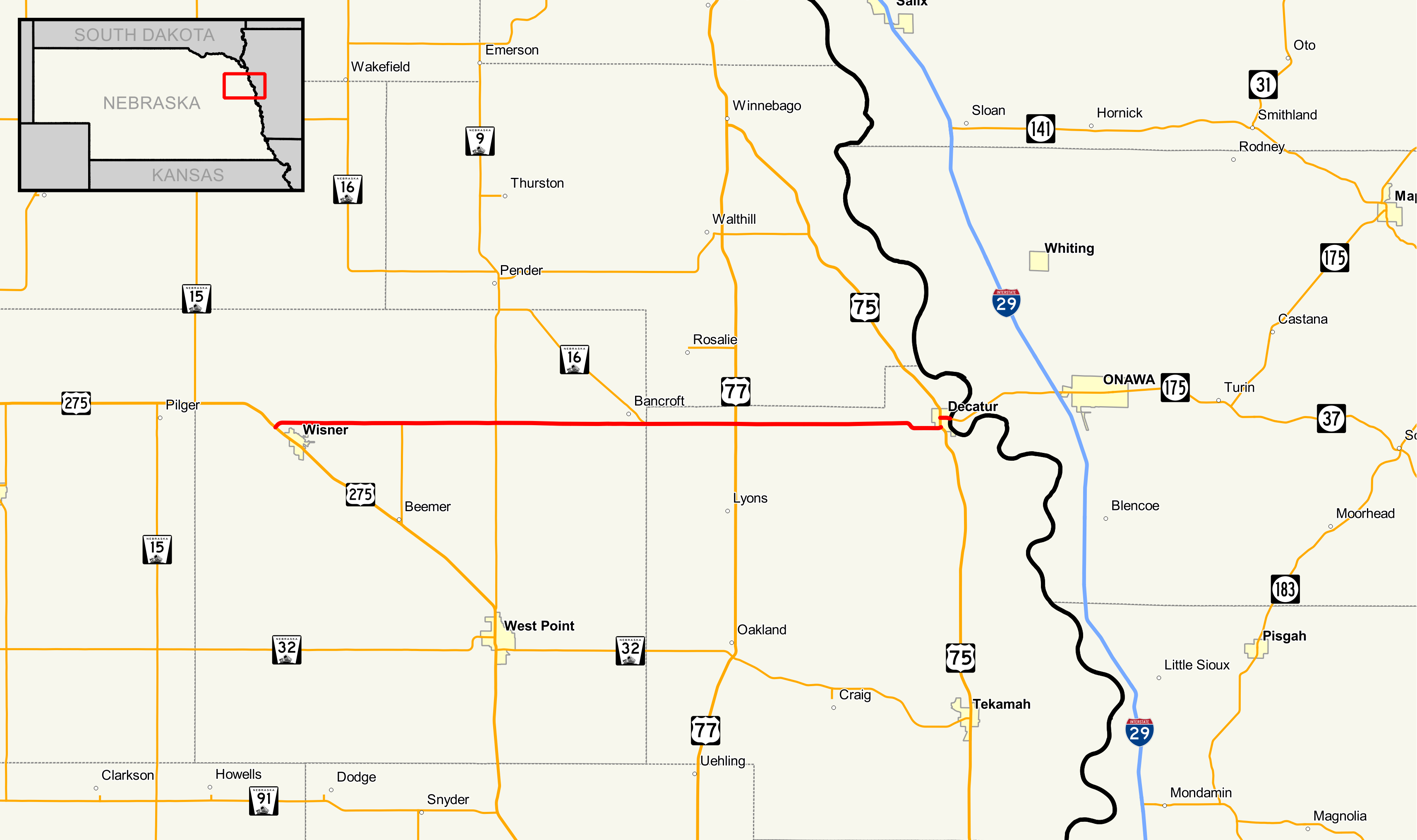
- Nebraska Highway 51 highlighted in red

Route information
- Maintained by NDOT
- Length: 36.63 mi (58.95 km)
- Existed: 1932–present

Major junctions
- West end: US 275 northwest of Wisner
- US 77 north of Lyons; US 75 in Decatur
- East end: Iowa 175 at Missouri River in Decatur

Location
- Country: United States
- State: Nebraska
- Counties: Cuming, Burt

Highway system
- Nebraska State Highway System; Interstate; US; State; Link; Spur; State Spurs; Recreation
← N-50	→ N-52

Nebraska Highway 51 is a highway in eastern Nebraska. It has a length of 36.63 miles (58.95 km) and runs from west to east. It has a western terminus at U.S. Highway 275 northwest of Wisner and an eastern terminus at the Burt County Missouri River Bridge at the Missouri River in Decatur.

== Route description ==
Nebraska Highway 51 begins northwest of Wisner at U.S. 275. It goes east into farmland and meets Nebraska Highway 9 west of Bancroft. It continues east and skirts the southern edge of Bancroft, after which it meets Nebraska Highway 16. After five miles (8 km), it meets U.S. Highway 77. It continues east and meets U.S. Highway 75 in Decatur. (According to a 1940 map, the highway turned south at Highway 77 to Lyons and then went east from Lyons to Decatur. It was apparently rerouted sometime between 1940 and 1955. The old section of road is now listed as Old Highway 118.) After overlapping in Decatur, Highway 51 turns east and crosses the Missouri River via the Burt County Missouri River Bridge. The highway continues on in Iowa as Iowa Highway 175.

== Major intersections ==
County	Location	mi	km	Destinations	Notes
Cuming	Wisner	0.00	0.00	US 275 – West Point, Norfolk	Western terminus
Cuming		6.80	10.94	L-20A south (12th Road) to US 275 – Beemer	
Cuming		11.78	18.96	N-9 (17th Road) – Pender, West Point	
Cuming–Burt county line		19.75	31.78	N-16 north – Pender	
Burt		24.50	39.43	US 77 – Sioux City, Fremont	
Burt	Decatur	35.50	57.13	US 75 south – Tekamah	Western end of US 75 overlap
Burt	Decatur	36.00	57.94	US 75 north (4th Avenue north)	Eastern end of US 75 overlap
Missouri River		36.63	58.95	Burt County Missouri River Bridge (formerly tolled); Nebraska–Iowa line	
Missouri River				Iowa 175 east	Continuation into Iowa
1.000 mi = 1.609 km; 1.000 km = 0.621 mi: Concurrency terminus
