= Missouri River Bridge =

Missouri River Bridge may refer to:

- Liberty Memorial Bridge, between Bismarck and Mandan, North Dakota, also known as Missouri River Bridge
- Bob Kerrey Pedestrian Bridge, also known as Missouri River Pedestrian Bridge
- Washington Bridge (Washington, Missouri), also known as Route 47 Missouri River Bridge
- Illinois Central Missouri River Bridge
- Union Pacific Missouri River Bridge
- Burt County Missouri River Bridge
- Missouri River Bridge, listed on the National Register of Historic Places listings in Lewis and Clark County, Montana

== See also ==
- List of crossings of the Missouri River
