= Lehigh, Iowa =

- City
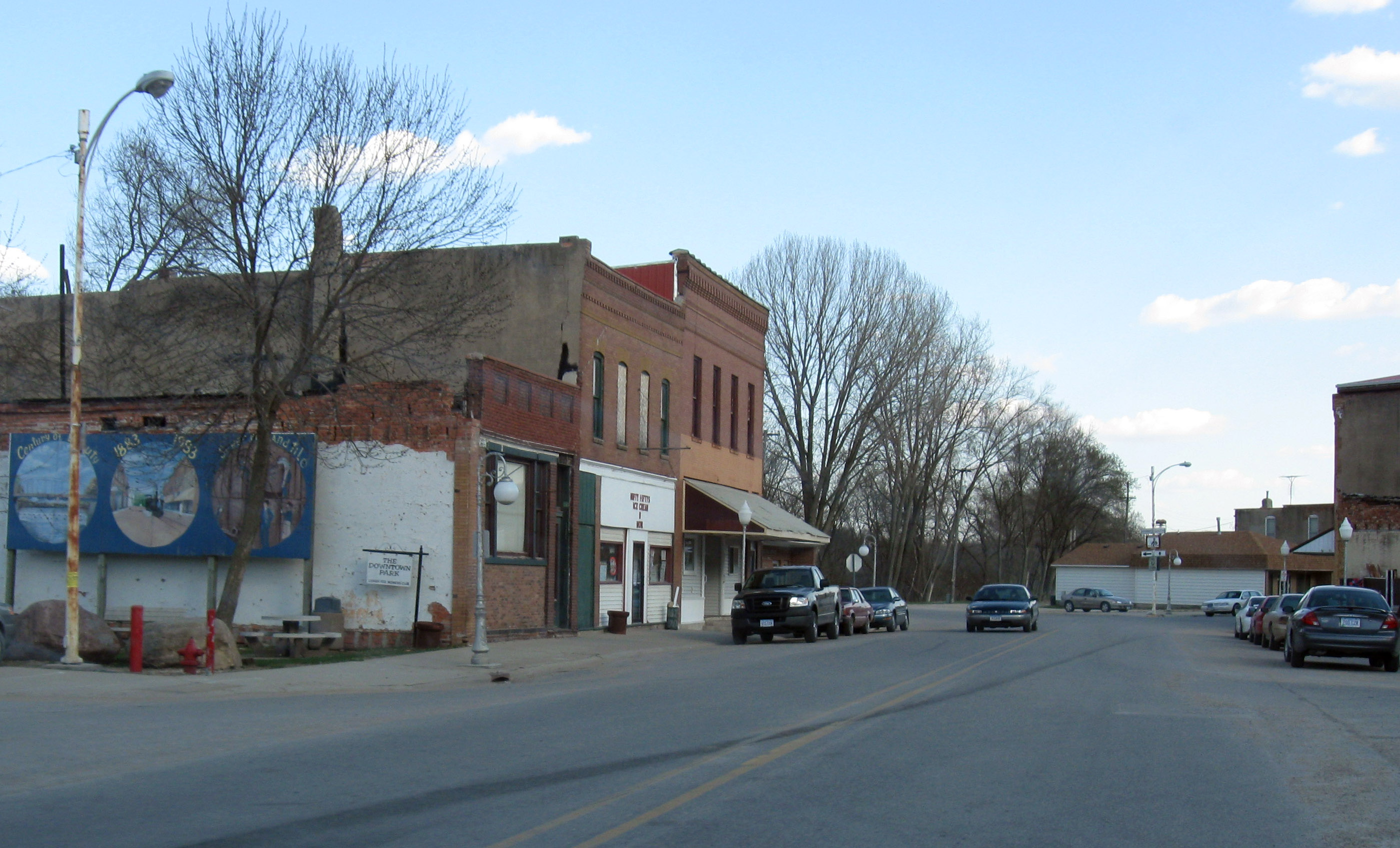
- Downtown Lehigh

- Location of Lehigh, Iowa
- Coordinates: 42°21′27″N 94°03′12″W
- Country: United States
- State: Iowa
- County: Webster

Area
  - Total: 2.17 sq mi (5.63 km^{2})
  - Land: 2.11 sq mi (5.47 km^{2})
  - Water: 0.062 sq mi (0.16 km^{2})
- Elevation: 1,076 ft (328 m)

Population (2020)
  - Total: 395
  - Density: 187.1/sq mi (72.25/km^{2})
- Time zone: UTC-6 (Central (CST))
  - Summer (DST): UTC-5 (CDT)
- ZIP code: 50557
- Area code: 515
- FIPS code: 19-44265
- GNIS feature ID: 2395671
- Website: cityoflehigh.com

Lehigh is a city in Webster County, Iowa, United States. The population was 395 at the time of the 2020 census.

Located in a valley, Lehigh is divided in two by the Des Moines River, unusual for such a small town. Originally the two halves of Lehigh were two separate towns. While the town on the west side of the River was always called Lehigh, the east town was called Slabtown, and a piece of history marks the east side's roots––a sign that hangs over the playground with the words "Slabtown Traders," perhaps alluding to the flea market which is held there every summer during Lehigh River Days. The "Slabtown Traders" sign was blown over by a gust of wind in the summer of 2010. It survived several floods while being located on River Street. Lehigh was surrounded by coal mines until the early 20th century and home to a large clay sewer pipe factory until the 1980s. Dolliver State Park, Brushy Creek State Recreation Area and Woodman Hollow State Preserve are located within a few miles of the town.

== History ==
Lehigh's first settlers, a Mr. Reed and Mr. Wright, set up a steam sawmill on the site in 1855. Originally, the town was named Slabtown because slabs, scrap from the mill, were used in construction. By 1870, there was a Methodist church and a school, and Oliver Tyson had purchased the mill and expanded it, adding a flour mill. Soon after this, Tyson opened a store. The town was later renamed Lehigh, comparing the local coal veins to those of Pennsylvania's Lehigh Valley.

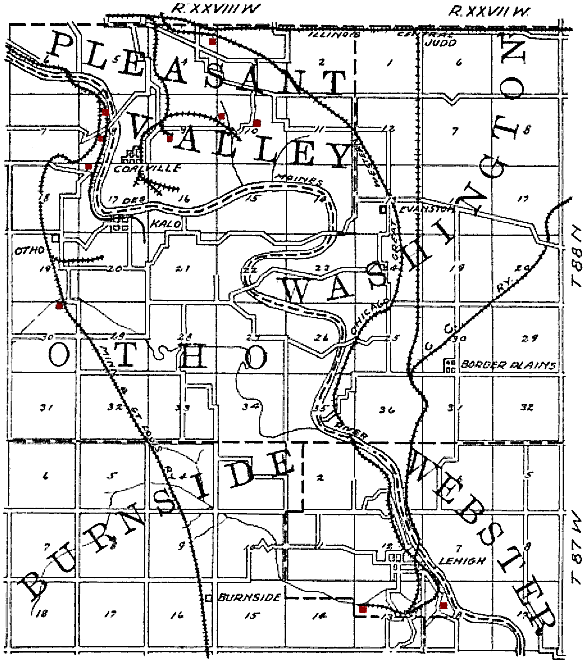
Map of the Lehigh area from 1908, showing the railroads and coal mines (in red) of the region. Lehigh is in the bottom right quadrant.

In 1871, W. C. Wilson of Webster City opened a coal mine in Lehigh and formed the Crooked Creek Railroad and Coal Company. The company built a 3-foot gauge rail line from Judd, on the Illinois Central Railroad 8.5 miles south to the mines, including a 370-foot wooden truss bridge across the Des Moines River. The line was later extended to Webster City. By 1894, the company had opened 5 mines, all using longwall mining. The Webster Coal and Land Company operated a mine near Lehigh from 1899 to 1902.

In 1878, Lehigh shipped 5,640 tons of coal. In 1883, 6,887 tons were shipped, in 1884, 9,000 tons. Membership in the United Mine Workers union is a useful measure of the importance of mining. In 1912, Lehigh was home to UMW Local 855 with 64 members (about 6.9% of the 1910 population).

The Crooked Creek railroad was widened to standard gauge in 1880 and a line to Webster City was built in 1886. In 1916, the line was incorporated into the Fort Dodge, Des Moines and Southern Railroad, Iowa's longest Interurban line. Diesel traction replaced overhead electric lines in the 1950s and the track was abandoned in 1962.

By 1901, Lehigh was large enough to support a new First National Bank, with an initial capitalization of $25,000. The bank must have been small; in 1910, O. J. Woodward arrived in town to become the cashier, manager and director of the bank.

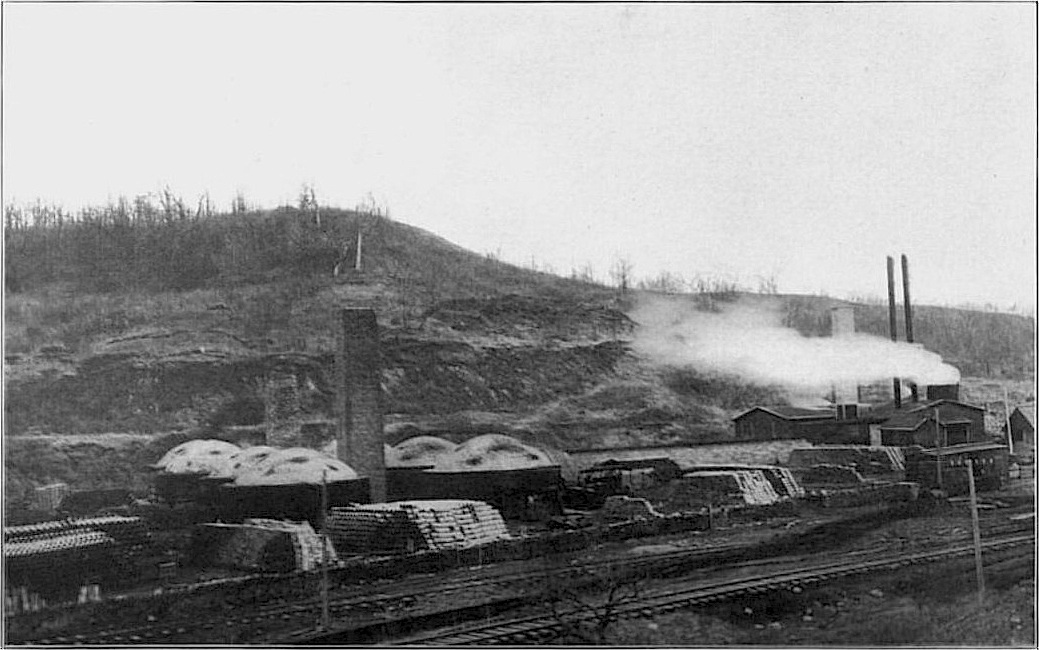
The Lehigh Brick and Tile brickyard, circa 1903.

In addition to coal mines, Lehigh was home to several other industries. The most prominent were brickyards that used the shale of the coal measures as a source of clay to make both brick and drain tile, firing their kilns with local coal. One of these, the Lehigh Brick and Tile company, won the contract to provide paving brick for Dubuque, Iowa in 1896, but suffered a serious fire in late 1897.

In 1901, there were 2 large brickworks in Lehigh, the Corey Pressed Brick Company and the Lehigh Clay Works, which began operation in 1900. In addition, the old Lehigh Brick and Tile works was being rebuilt after the fire. Corey was mining clay from both above and below the coal seam. By 1903, Lehigh Brick and Tile was back in production, the Lehigh and the Campbell brickyard of the Webster city Brick and Tile Company. The Cory plant was primarily a brickworks, while the others primarily produced drainage tile.

== Geography ==
Lehigh is located on the west bank of the Des Moines River.

According to the United States Census Bureau, the city has a total area of 2.15 square miles (5.57 km^{2}), of which 2.09 square miles (5.41 km^{2}) is land and 0.06 square miles (0.16 km^{2}) is water.

== Demographics ==
Historical populations
Year	Pop.	±%
1890	870	—
1900	806	−7.4%
1910	928	+15.1%
1920	1,090	+17.5%
1930	996	−8.6%
1940	1,004	+0.8%
1950	881	−12.3%
1960	846	−4.0%
1970	739	−12.6%
1980	654	−11.5%
1990	536	−18.0%
2000	497	−7.3%
2010	416	−16.3%
2020	395	−5.0%
Iowa Data Center; Source: U.S. Decennial Census

=== 2020 census ===
As of the census of 2020, there were 395 people, 188 households, and 113 families residing in the city. The population density was 187.1 inhabitants per square mile (72.2/km^{2}). There were 215 housing units at an average density of 101.9 per square mile (39.3/km^{2}). The racial makeup of the city was 97.2% White, 0.0% Black or African American, 0.0% Native American, 0.0% Asian, 0.0% Pacific Islander, 0.0% from other races and 2.8% from two or more races. Hispanic or Latino persons of any race comprised 1.0% of the population.

Of the 188 households, 23.9% of which had children under the age of 18 living with them, 42.0% were married couples living together, 9.6% were cohabitating couples, 18.6% had a female householder with no spouse or partner present and 29.8% had a male householder with no spouse or partner present. 39.9% of all households were non-families. 34.6% of all households were made up of individuals, 12.8% had someone living alone who was 65 years old or older.

The median age in the city was 43.9 years. 22.0% of the residents were under the age of 20; 6.3% were between the ages of 20 and 24; 22.3% were from 25 and 44; 27.3% were from 45 and 64; and 22.0% were 65 years of age or older. The gender makeup of the city was 56.2% male and 43.8% female.

=== 2010 census ===
As of the census of 2010, there were 416 people, 205 households, and 118 families residing in the city. The population density was 199.0 inhabitants per square mile (76.8/km^{2}). There were 231 housing units at an average density of 110.5 per square mile (42.7/km^{2}). The racial makeup of the city was 98.6% White, 0.2% African American, and 1.2% from two or more races. Hispanic or Latino of any race were 0.2% of the population.

There were 205 households, of which 18.0% had children under the age of 18 living with them, 43.4% were married couples living together, 7.3% had a female householder with no husband present, 6.8% had a male householder with no wife present, and 42.4% were non-families. 36.6% of all households were made up of individuals, and 19.1% had someone living alone who was 65 years of age or older. The average household size was 2.03 and the average family size was 2.61.

The median age in the city was 49.8 years. 16.8% of residents were under the age of 18; 8.7% were between the ages of 18 and 24; 16.6% were from 25 to 44; 36% were from 45 to 64; and 21.9% were 65 years of age or older. The gender makeup of the city was 51.7% male and 48.3% female.

=== 2000 census ===
As of the census of 2000, there were 497 people, 223 households, and 130 families residing in the city. The population density was 239.3 inhabitants per square mile (92.4/km^{2}). There were 247 housing units at an average density of 118.9 per square mile (45.9/km^{2}). The racial makeup of the city was 98.19% White, 0.40% African American, 0.20% from other races, and 1.21% from two or more races. Hispanic or Latino of any race were 0.20% of the population.

There were 223 households, out of which 23.3% had children under the age of 18 living with them, 45.3% were married couples living together, 4.9% had a female householder with no husband present, and 41.7% were non-families. 35.0% of all households were made up of individuals, and 15.7% had someone living alone who was 65 years of age or older. The average household size was 2.23 and the average family size was 2.86.

In the city, the population was spread out, with 24.5% under the age of 18, 6.0% from 18 to 24, 24.1% from 25 to 44, 25.2% from 45 to 64, and 20.1% who were 65 years of age or older. The median age was 42 years. For every 100 females, there were 110.6 males. For every 100 females age 18 and over, there were 110.7 males.

The median income for a household in the city was $25,227, and the median income for a family was $31,458. Males had a median income of $26,484 versus $24,250 for females. The per capita income for the city was $13,816. About 10.5% of families and 14.9% of the population were below the poverty line, including 27.4% of those under age 18 and 3.9% of those age 65 or over.

== Education ==
It is in the Southeast Valley Community School District. Southeast Valley High School in Gowrie is that district's comprehensive high school.

Lehigh was a part of the Southeast Webster-Grand Community School District, established on July 1, 2005, by the merger of the Grand Community School District and the Southeast Webster Community School District. In 2023 the Southeast Webster-Grand district merged into the Southeast Valley district.

It was previously served by the Southeast Webster Community School District, which was formed on July 1, 1991, with the merger of the Central Webster Community School District and the Dayton Community School District.

== Notable persons ==
- John Donaldson (pitcher) ended his 30+-year professional baseball career in Lehigh (1949).
- Hugh Lester, professional soccer player for Liverpool F.C.
