= Peter A. Sarpy =

American owner

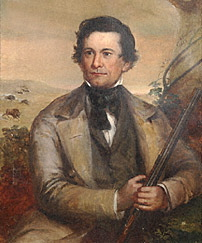
- Born: Pierre Sylvester Grégoire Sarpy; 1804; St. Louis, Louisiana Territory (now St. Louis, Missouri, U.S.)
- Died: January 4, 1865 (aged 60–61); Plattsmouth, Nebraska Territory
- Occupation: Fur trader
- Known for: Civic activities

Peter Abadie Sarpy (1804 – January 4, 1865) was a French-American entrepreneur and fur trader. He was the owner and operator of several fur trading posts essential to the development of the Nebraska Territory and a thriving ferry business. Also, he helped plan the towns of Bellevue and Decatur, Nebraska. Nebraska's legislature named Sarpy County after him in honor of his service to the state.

== Biography ==
Peter A. Sarpy was born in St. Louis in 1804. His father Gregoire Berald Sarpy was born in New Orleans in 1764 and moved to St. Louis in 1786; Gregoire Sarpy was one of 10 children of Charles and Susanne Trenty Sarpy, immigrants from Fumel, Gascony, France. He was christened Pierre Sylvester Grégoire Sarpy, but he later anglicized his name. He also took his mother's maiden name, L'Abadie, using "A" for his middle initial. Peter's father was Grégoire Sarpy, who died in 1824. Peter had two brothers. The family was French Creole from Louisiana. They joined other ethnic French in migrating to the growing town of St. Louis after the Louisiana Purchase in 1803 by the United States. The lucrative fur trade and much of the economy of St. Louis was originally dominated by ethnic French families. They established trading posts along the upper Missouri River and also to the Southwest in Spanish territory.

=== Nebraska Territory ===
In 1824 at the age of 19, Sarpy went to the upper Missouri River, in the Nebraska Territory, to work at the American Fur Company's trading post at Council Bluff, north of present-day Bellevue, Nebraska. He was based at Fort Bellevue until 1831. That company was owned by renowned American fur baron John Jacob Astor, who established a monopoly in the industry.

Sarpy next worked for his brother's father-in-law, John Pierre Cabanné, who ran Cabanne's Trading Post.

Cabanné's Post and Pilcher's Post, the latter established at Bellevue by the Missouri Fur Company, competed for the fur trade of area Indian tribes: the Omaha, Ponca, Otoe, and Pawnee. The Missouri Fur Company was founded by French Creole families of St. Louis. Some of their ancestors had migrated to the new settlement of St. Louis in the late eighteenth century from farms in western Illinois. They left when the latter area was transferred from French to British control following Great Britain's victory over France in the Seven Years' War. More migrated after the American Revolution, as they wanted to evade US Protestant rule in Illinois.

The fur trade in the region yielded such profits that for decades it was the most important driver of the St. Louis economy. In 1821 it represented $600,000 of the town's annual commerce of $2 million.

Sarpy later established a trading post and supply point for white settlers and pioneers on the Iowa side of the upper Missouri River. It went by various names, including Sarpy's Point and the "Trader's Post".

In 1832 Cabanné ordered Sarpy to head a group of American Fur Company employees to take over a keelboat and goods which belonged to a competing company. Because of its profits, the fur trade business had cutthroat competition. After they were caught, US authorities ordered Cabanné and Sarpy to leave the Indian Territory for a year. The company replaced Cabanné with Joshua Pilcher at Cabanné's Trading Post in North Omaha. Sarpy operated the Council Bluff trading post during 1835.

=== Colorado ===
Sarpy moved westward the next year, and in 1837 he established Fort Jackson on the upper South Platte River in present-day Colorado. Financed by Pratt, Chouteau, and Company, Sarpy established the fort with the help of Henry Fraeb, an experienced trapper and former Rocky Mountain Fur Company man. At Fort Jackson, the two traded tin ware, traps, clothes, blankets, powder, lead, and whiskey for pelts. Sarpy did well at this trading post, maintaining an inventory of $12,000 and paying his employees $200 a year. Bent, St. Vrain & Company bought out Fort Jackson to avoid competing with the Sarpy operation. After the sale, Sarpy cut ties with Fraeb. Fraeb was killed in 1850 by Sioux Indians (Lakota) along the Snake River.

=== Missouri ===
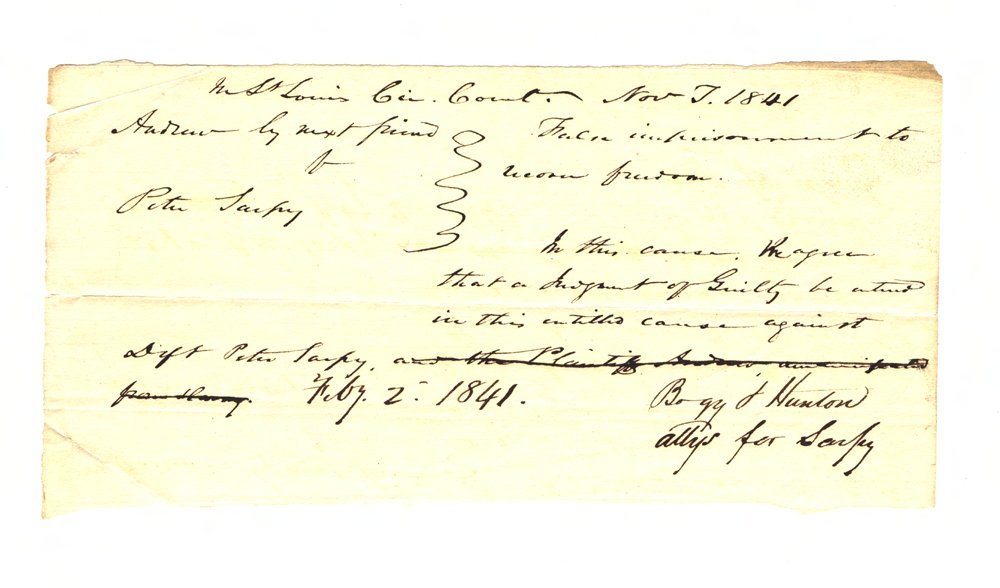
In this cause We agree that a Judgment of Guilty be entered in this entitled cause against Deft Peter Sarpy, and the Plaintiff Andrew, Feb. 2. 1841.

At some point, Sarpy returned to St. Louis, where he owned at least one slave, known as Andrew. Andrew's mother, Celeste, helped her son to sue Sarpy for his freedom in 1839. In this process, she filed as his "next friend", as authorized under the state's slave law. Andrew alleged trespass and false imprisonment. Apparently members of Andrew's family had earlier been pronounced free by a verdict of the circuit court of St. Louis and St Charles county. Andrew said that Sarpy had beat and mistreated him and, most importantly, held him as a slave although he was a free person. The suit asked for damages of $200 and Andrew's freedom. Sarpy pleaded not guilty to these charges, but he was convicted in court on February 2, 1841.

=== Returning to Nebraska ===
In 1838, Sarpy returned to the Bellevue area and built another trading post. He lived primarily at Fort Bellevue for the next twenty-six years. After Sarpy returned, he became influential in community affairs. About 1846 he started a ferry business across the Missouri, between Bellevue and the Iowa side. Through the next year, he ferried migrating Mormons across the river and also sold them supplies for the rest of their westward trip. During the ensuing gold rush years, Sarpy's ferry boats hauled many would-be gold miners across the Missouri River. Sarpy expanded his ferry business in two other locations: to cross the Elkhorn River at Elkhorn City, later called Elk City, and also at a fork of the Loup River near present-day Columbus. By the 1850s, his fleet included a steam-powered ferry.

Through his efforts, in 1849 a United States post office, mark of a rising town, was established in Bellevue. Following the United States' negotiation in 1854 of a treaty by which the Omaha people ceded their land in Nebraska, that year Sarpy was among the group that laid out the town of Bellevue. In 1857 Sarpy joined Stephen Decatur and others in founding Decatur along the Missouri in northeastern Burt County.

Sarpy and his family moved to Plattsmouth in 1862. He died there on January 4, 1865. He is buried in Calvary Cemetery in St. Louis, Missouri.

== Marriage and family ==
Sarpy married Ni-co-mi (also spelled Ni-co-ma), a woman of the Iowa people. She brought her mixed-race daughter Mary Gale to the marriage. Ni-co-mi had been the consort of the American surgeon John Gale, who had been stationed at Fort Atkinson in Nebraska. When it was closed in 1827 and Gale was reassigned, he left Ni-co-mi and Mary behind. Sarpy and Ni-co-mi are not known to have had any children together.

As an adult, Mary Gale (also known as Hinnuaganun, or One Woman) married Joseph LaFlesche, a Métis fur trader of Ponca and French descent. Adopted as a son by the Omaha chief Big Elk and designated his successor, LaFlesche became the last recognized principal chief of the Omaha and the only one to have had any European ancestry. He led the people in their transition to living on a reservation.

== Honors and legacy ==
- Sarpy County was named in his honor.
- Sarpy's Post was added to the National Register of Historic Places.

== See also ==
- History of Nebraska
- French people in Nebraska
