= Lincoln Township, Black Hawk County, Iowa =

Township in Iowa, US

Lincoln Township, Black Hawk County
- Township
- Coordinates: 42°20′37″N 092°28′41″W
- Country: United States
- State: Iowa
- County: Black Hawk

Area
  - Total: 35.97 sq mi (93.17 km^{2})
  - Land: 35.97 sq mi (93.17 km^{2})
  - Water: 0 sq mi (0 km^{2})
- Elevation: 971 ft (296 m)

Population (2000)
  - Total: 403
  - Density: 11/sq mi (4.3/km^{2})
- FIPS code: 19-92526
- GNIS feature ID: 0468241

Lincoln Township is one of seventeen rural townships in Black Hawk County, Iowa, United States. As of the 2000 census, its population was 403.

== Geography ==
Lincoln Township covers an area of 35.97 square miles (93.2 km^{2}) and contains no incorporated settlements. According to the USGS, it contains three cemeteries: Blessing, Calvary, and Lincoln. Black Hawk Creek runs through the northwestern corner of the Township

== Places in the Township ==
- Blessing, historical place
- Blessing Cemetery.
- Voorhies, unincorporated village

== Major highways ==
- U.S. Route 63 runs north–south through the center of the township.
- Iowa Highway 175 enters the township in the southwest corner, runs south of Voorhies and intersections U.S. Route 63
