= Southeast Webster-Grand Community School District =

Public school district in Burnside, Iowa, United States

Coordinates: 42.342171°N 94.106071°W

Location
- Burnside, Iowa Boone, Webster, and Greene counties United States
- Coordinates: 42.342171, -94.106071

District information
- Type: Local school district
- Grades: K-12
- Established: 2005
- Closed: 2023
- Superintendent: Brian Johnson
- Schools: 2
- Budget: $8,983,000 (2017-18)
- NCES District ID: 1999019

Students and staff
- Students: 569 (2019-20)
- Teachers: 39.77 FTE
- Staff: 46.72 FTE
- Student–teacher ratio: 14.314
- Athletic conference: Twin Lakes
- District mascot: Jaguars
- Colors: Teal, Silver, and Black

Other information
- Website: www.southeastvalley.org

Southeast Webster-Grand Community School District was a rural public school district headquartered in Burnside, Iowa. It, along with Prairie Valley Community School District, operated under the name Southeast Valley and they are the Jaguars. The district occupied sections of Boone and Webster counties, with a small portion in Greene County. It served Boxholm, Dayton, Fraser, Harcourt, Lehigh, and Pilot Mound.

The district shared Southeast Valley High School.

In 2023 the district merged into the Southeast Valley Community School District.

== History ==
It was established on July 1, 2005, by the merger of the Grand Community School District and the Southeast Webster Community School District.

In August 2014, the district began a whole grade-sharing arrangement with the Prairie Valley Community School District as a way to deal with smaller enrollments and as a way to save money. The two districts together share middle and high schools.

In March 2022 voters agreed to consolidate Southeast Webster-Grand with Prairie Valley to form Southeast Valley Community School District, effective fall 2023. On July 1, 2023, the merger occurred.

== Schools ==
- Dayton Center, Dayton
- Southeast Webster-Grand Southeast Valley Middle School, Burnside (operated with Prairie Valley Community School District)
- Southeast Valley High School, Gowrie (operated with Prairie Valley Community School District)

== See also ==
- List of school districts in Iowa
