= Hugh Lester =

American footballer

Personal information
- Date of birth: 1891
- Place of birth: Lehigh, Iowa, United States
- Date of death: 5 August 1933 (age 42)
- Place of death: Abergele, Wales
- Height: 5 ft 8 in (1.73 m)
- Positions: Outside forward; full-back

Senior career*
Years	Team	Apps	(Gls)
1911	St. Helen's Recreation		
1911–1913	Liverpool	2	(0)
1913–1915	Oldham Athletic	1	(0)
1919–1920	Reading		
- * Club domestic league appearances and goals

Hugh Lester (1891 – 5 August 1933) was an American professional association footballer. He began his career with Liverpool in 1911, making two appearances in the English Football League as an outside-forward. He later played for Oldham Athletic, where he converted to playing as a full-back, and Reading. A former amateur sprinter, he was considered "the fastest player in professional football" at the time.

== Career ==
Born in Lehigh, Iowa, Lester was an amateur sprinter and recorded a personal best time of 10.5 seconds in the 100 metres. After moving to Britain, he took up football and played for local amateur teams Earlestown and St. Helen's Recreation. In 1911, he joined First Division side Liverpool. After initially featuring for the club's reserve side in the Central League, he made his professional debut on 8 April 1912 in a 2–0 victory over Bradford City. His appearance made him the first non-British player to feature for the club.

He made one further appearance for the club, on 14 October 1912 in a 4–1 defeat against Sheffield United, before joining Second Division side Oldham Athletic in May 1913. He converted to playing as a full-back at Oldham but made just one senior appearance for the club. The Football League was suspended in 1915 due to the outbreak of World War I, with Lester appearing as a guest player for Prescot during the hostilities. When competitive football resumed in 1919, he joined Southern Football League side Reading where he spent one season.

He later played for amateur clubs Colwyn Bay, Llandudno and Weston-super-Mare before retiring. He was killed in a motorcycle accident on 5 August 1933 along with his passenger when they collided with a car in Abergele.

== Career statistics ==
Appearances and goals by club, season and competition
Club	Season	League			FA Cup		League Cup		Other		Total	
Club	Season	Division	Apps	Goals	Apps	Goals	Apps	Goals	Apps	Goals	Apps	Goals
Liverpool	1911–12	First Division	1	0	0	0	0	0	0	0	1	0
Liverpool	1912–13	First Division	1	0	0	0	0	0	0	0	1	0
Liverpool	Liverpool total		2	0	0	0	0	0	0	0	2	0
Oldham Athletic	1913–14	Second Division	0	0	0	0	0	0	0	0	0	0
Oldham Athletic	1914–15	Second Division	1	0	0	0	0	0	0	0	1	0
Total			3	0	0	0	0	0	0	0	3	0
