= Southeast Webster Community School District =

Defunct school district in Iowa, United States

Southeast Webster Community School District was a school district in Iowa.

Communities served include Burnside, Dayton, Harcourt, and Lehigh. It operated Burnside Elementary School, Dayton Elementary School, Southeast Webster Middle School, and Southeast Webster High School. As of 1998 it had about 600 students. The district's mascot was the eagle.

== History ==
It formed on July 1, 1991, with the merger of the Central Webster Community School District and the Dayton Community School District. On July 1, 2005, it merged with the Grand Community School District to form the Southeast Webster-Grand Community School District.
