= Burnside, Iowa =

Burnside
- Unincorporated community
- Location within the state of Iowa Burnside (the United States)
- Coordinates: 42°20′45″N 94°06′25″W
- Country: United States
- State: Iowa
- County: Webster
- Established: June 16, 1856
- Elevation: 1,139 ft (347 m)
- Time zone: UTC-6 (Central (CST))
  - Summer (DST): UTC-5 (CDT)
- ZIP codes: 50521
- GNIS feature ID: 454998

Burnside is an unincorporated community in Webster County, Iowa, United States. Burnside has a post office with the ZIP code 50521.

== History ==
Present-day Burnside was laid out as a town named Buchanan on June 16, 1856. It was later renamed Hesperia. A post office was established in 1875 and the town was an important stagecoach stop between Boone, Iowa and Humboldt, Iowa. The conductor of the first Minneapolis and St. Louis Railway train passing through town in 1882 was a friend of Ambrose Burnside, who had recently died. The town was renamed in his honor.

Burnside's population was 63 in 1902. The population was 83 in 1940.

== Education ==
It is located in the Southeast Valley Community School District, which formed in 2023. Burnside includes the Southeast Valley Middle School, while Southeast Valley High School is in Gowrie.

Despite its small size, Burnside was the location of the area high school, Southeast Webster, originally known as Central Webster. The high school hold about 250 students 7-12 grade. It was a part of the Southeast Webster-Grand Community School District, established on July 1, 2005, by the merger of the Grand Community School District and the Southeast Webster Community School District. Southeast Webster-Grand merged into the Southeast Valley district in 2023.

It was previously served by the Southeast Webster Community School District, which was formed on July 1, 1991, with the merger of the Central Webster Community School District and the Dayton Community School District.

== Notable person ==
- Clark R. Mollenhoff, journalist
