= Burt County Missouri River Bridge =

Missouri River bridge between Iowa and Nebraska

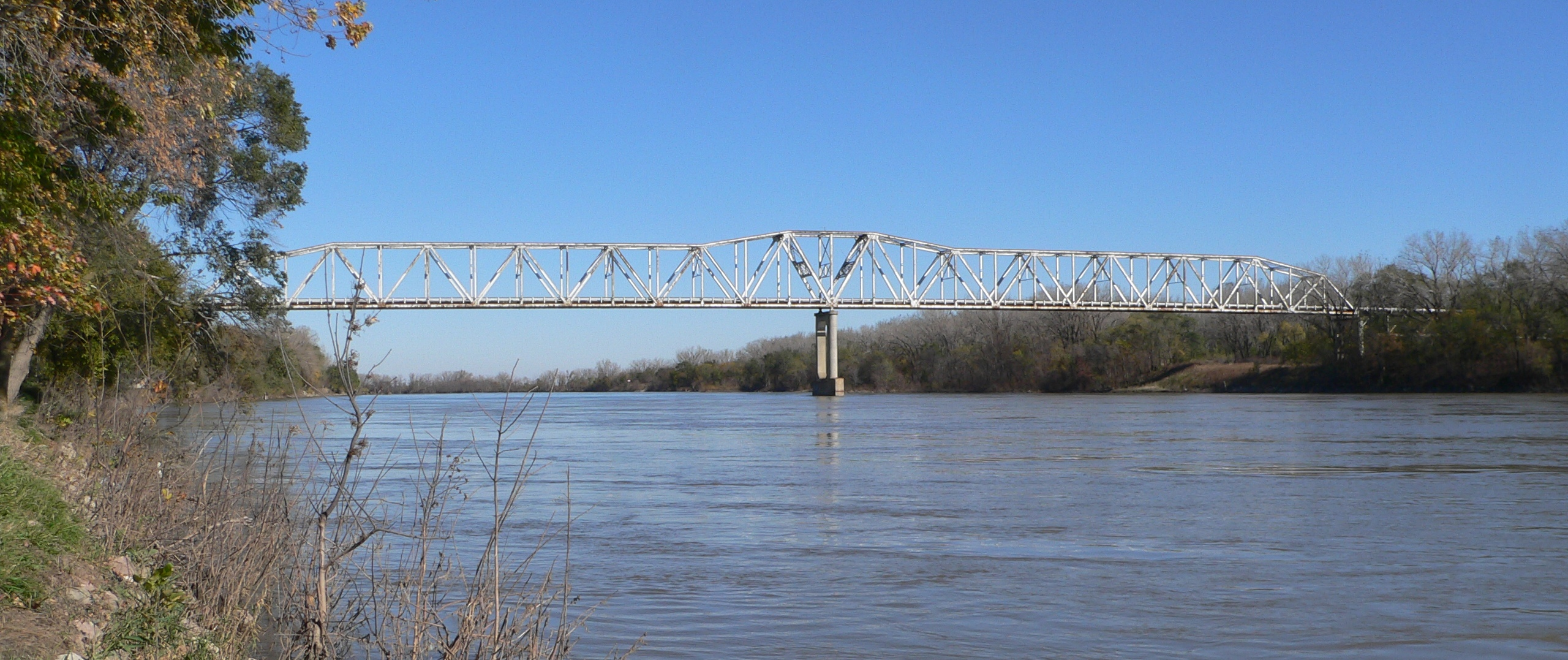
- Bridge seen from downstream
- Coordinates: 42°00′25″N 96°14′31″W
- Carries: N-51 / Iowa 175
- Crosses: Missouri River
- Locale: Burt County

History
- Construction end: 1951
- Opened: 1955

Statistics
- Toll: None

Location
- Interactive map of Burt County Missouri River Bridge

The Burt County Missouri River Bridge is a continuous truss bridge over the Missouri River connecting Burt County, Nebraska and Monona County, Iowa at Decatur, Nebraska.

The bridge connects Nebraska Highway 51 and Iowa Highway 175. Interstate 29 is 7 miles east and Onawa, Iowa 8 miles east of the Missouri River.

The bridge was finished in 1951 and carried the first traffic in 1955 after the US Army Corps of Engineers diverted the river to flow under the bridge. In late 2013, it became toll free under the joint ownership of the states of Nebraska and Iowa; up to that time, it had been one of three toll bridges in Nebraska.

== See also ==
- List of crossings of the Missouri River
