= Stephen Decatur Bross =

American politician

Stephen A. Decatur
- Born: Stephen Decatur Bross; November 27, 1815
- Died: June 5, 1888 (aged 72)
- Known for: pioneer settler in Nebraska and Colorado

Stephen A. Decatur (born 1813, died 1888 or 1889), born Stephen Decatur Bross and often referred to as Commodore Decatur, was one of the earliest settlers in Nebraska. He was born and educated in the East, where he became a school teacher and started a family.

After having abandoned his wife and two children in New York in the 1840s, Bross moved west to Nebraska Territory. For the rest of his life, he used the name "Stephen Decatur." He was the namesake and one of the incorporators of Decatur, Nebraska, the second-oldest European-American settlement in Nebraska. He gained his nickname of "Commodore Decatur" by claiming to be a nephew of the Naval hero of the War of 1812.

Decatur married again in Nebraska. In 1859 he abandoned his second wife and their child when he moved to Colorado Territory, where he lived in various towns for the remainder of his life. He served a term in the Colorado territorial legislature from 1866 to 1868, after the American Civil War.

== Biography ==
Decatur was born in Sussex County, New Jersey, to Moses Bross and Jane (Winfield) Bross. He was counted as the second of eleven children, because his twin brother William was born a few minutes earlier. They both attended Williams College during the 1830s, and roomed together. William also later went West, settling in Chicago, Illinois. He was later active in the Republican Party and elected as lieutenant governor.

Stephen became a schoolteacher under the name Stephen Decatur Bross in New Jersey and New York. In the early 1840s he suddenly disappeared, abandoning his wife and two children.

He next surfaced in Nebraska Territory, where he used the name Stephen Decatur. While on the Nebraska frontier, he served in the Mexican–American War. He arrived in what is now the Decatur area, on the upper Missouri River, from Bellevue in 1841. He first made his home with the Omaha tribe, which had long occupied this territory. He lived on a farm called "Decatur Springs," named for a spring of pure water found there that supplied water to the town for the next century.

Later Decatur worked as a clerk at the trading post of Colonel Peter Sarpy, who had numerous posts in Nebraska affiliated with the American Fur Company. The one in Decatur opened in 1854. Sarpy was also important to early Nebraska development, attracting residents and settlement near such posts. In 1854 Decatur was a candidate to serve in Nebraska's First Territorial Assembly, but he was not seated. He has been described as a "highly educated man who claimed he was a nephew of Commodore Stephen Decatur, Naval hero of the War of 1812."

The town of Decatur, Nebraska, was incorporated in 1856 under the name "The Decatur Townsite & Ferry Company." The other incorporators included Thomas Whiteacre, T. H. Hineman, George Mason, and Herman Glass. The patents for the town were granted by the legislatureon May 1, 1862.

In Nebraska Decatur married again. In 1859 he moved to the Colorado Territory to work in the gold fields, leaving behind his second wife and their child. During the American Civil War, he enlisted in the 3rd Colorado Regiment. After the war he remained in Colorado, including a stint in Georgetown, where he published the Georgetown Miner.

Soon he moved to Summit County, Colorado, which he represented in the territorial legislature from 1866 to 1868. He died June 5, 1888, in Rosita, Colorado, a small camp in the Sangre de Cristo Mountains. His age at death was estimated to be 80. He is buried in Rosita Cemetery in Custer County, Colorado.
