= Stephen Decatur High School =

Stephen Decatur High School may refer:

- Stephen Decatur High School (Decatur, Illinois)
- Stephen Decatur High School (Maryland) in Berlin, Maryland

== See also ==
- Stephen Decatur Middle School, Clinton, Maryland
