= Voorhies, Iowa =

- Unincorporated community
- Location within the state of Iowa Voorhies, Iowa (the United States)
- Coordinates: 42°20′09″N 92°28′58″W
- Country: United States
- State: Iowa
- County: Black Hawk
- Elevation: 1,001 ft (305 m)
- Time zone: UTC-6 (Central (CST))
  - Summer (DST): UTC-5 (CDT)
- ZIP codes: 50643
- Area code: 319
- GNIS feature ID: 462593

Voorhies is an unincorporated community in Lincoln Township, Black Hawk County, Iowa, United States.

Voorhies is located in the most southwestern portion of Black Hawk County approximately 6 miles (9.7 km) southwest of Hudson and 7 miles (11 km) east of Reinbeck.

== History ==
Voorhies was platted on June 17, 1900, shortly after the Chicago and Northwestern Railway reached its location.

There are two businesses currently in Voorhies—a grain elevator, the Voorhies Grain Company and Raincap Industries. However, in 1904 in addition to the Northern Grain Company Voohries had a cooperative telephone association and creamery.

In 1924, Voorhies' population was 45. The population was 75 in 1940.
