= Harcourt, Iowa =

- City
- Location of Harcourt, Iowa
- Coordinates: 42°15′38″N 94°10′28″W
- Country: USA
- State: Iowa
- County: Webster

Area
  - Total: 1.01 sq mi (2.62 km^{2})
  - Land: 1.01 sq mi (2.62 km^{2})
  - Water: 0 sq mi (0.00 km^{2})
- Elevation: 1,175 ft (358 m)

Population (2020)
  - Total: 264
  - Density: 261.1/sq mi (100.81/km^{2})
- Time zone: UTC-6 (Central (CST))
  - Summer (DST): UTC-5 (CDT)
- ZIP code: 50544
- Area code: 515
- FIPS code: 19-34410
- GNIS feature ID: 2394293

Harcourt is a city in Webster County, Iowa, United States. The population was 264 at the time of the 2020 census.

== History ==
Harcourt was platted in 1881. It was named for William Vernon Harcourt, a British statesman. A post office has been in operation in Harcourt since 1882.

== Geography ==
According to the United States Census Bureau, the city has a total area of 1.00 square mile (2.59 km^{2}), all land.

== Demographics ==
Historical populations
Year	Pop.	±%
1900	192	—
1910	247	+28.6%
1920	307	+24.3%
1930	264	−14.0%
1940	282	+6.8%
1950	303	+7.4%
1960	268	−11.6%
1970	305	+13.8%
1980	347	+13.8%
1990	306	−11.8%
2000	340	+11.1%
2010	303	−10.9%
2020	264	−12.9%
Source:"U.S. Census website". United States Census Bureau. and Iowa Data Center; Source: U.S. Decennial Census

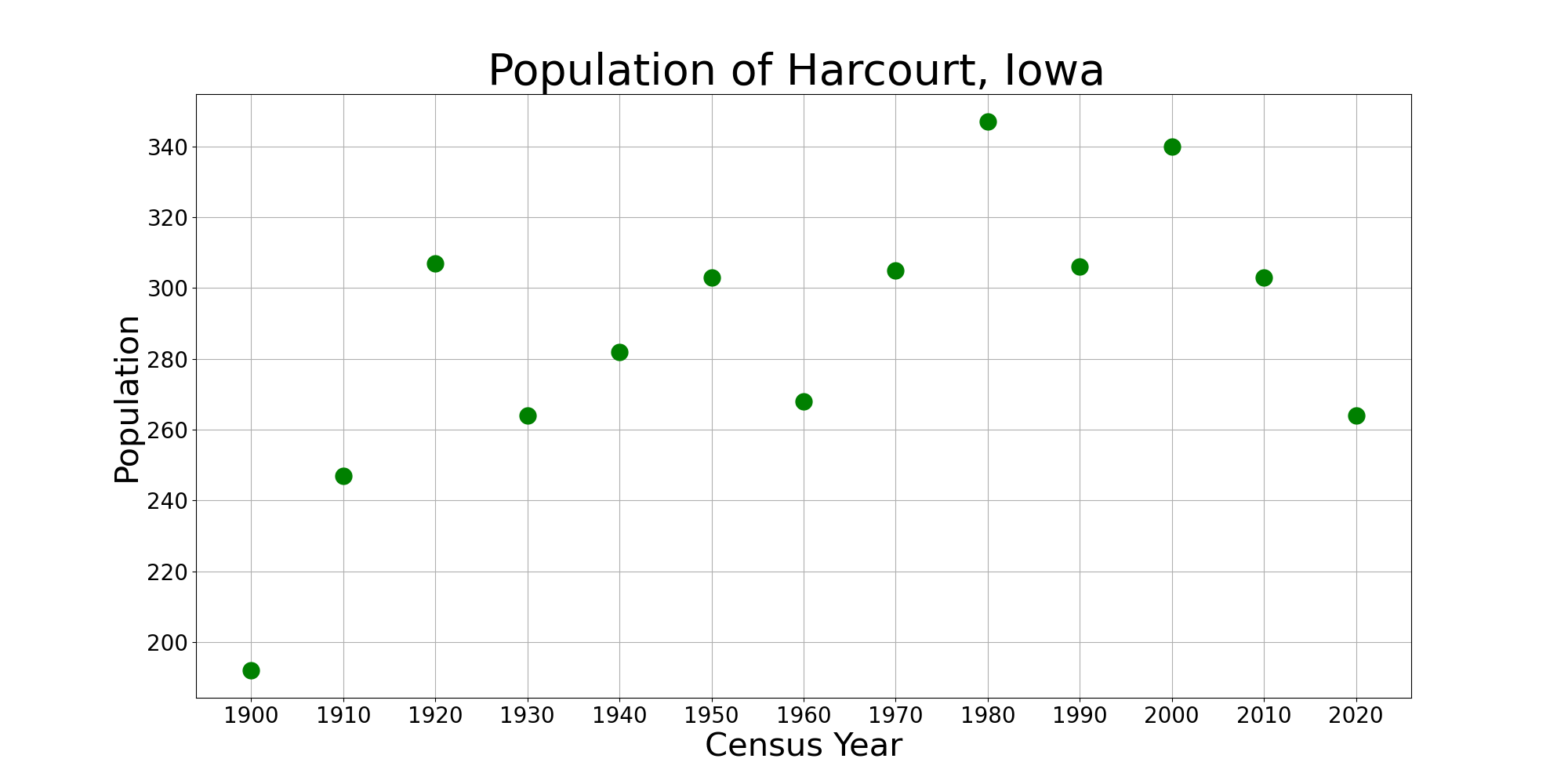
The population of Harcourt, Iowa from US census data

=== 2020 census ===
As of the census of 2020, there were 264 people, 120 households, and 74 families residing in the city. The population density was 261.1 inhabitants per square mile (100.8/km^{2}). There were 138 housing units at an average density of 136.5 per square mile (52.7/km^{2}). The racial makeup of the city was 91.7% White, 0.4% Black or African American, 0.8% Native American, 0.0% Asian, 0.0% Pacific Islander, 0.8% from other races and 6.4% from two or more races. Hispanic or Latino persons of any race comprised 4.5% of the population.

Of the 120 households, 26.7% of which had children under the age of 18 living with them, 46.7% were married couples living together, 7.5% were cohabitating couples, 22.5% had a female householder with no spouse or partner present and 23.3% had a male householder with no spouse or partner present. 38.3% of all households were non-families. 30.8% of all households were made up of individuals, 8.3% had someone living alone who was 65 years old or older.

The median age in the city was 45.3 years. 21.2% of the residents were under the age of 20; 6.1% were between the ages of 20 and 24; 22.0% were from 25 and 44; 28.4% were from 45 and 64; and 22.3% were 65 years of age or older. The gender makeup of the city was 49.6% male and 50.4% female.

=== 2010 census ===
As of the census of 2010, there were 303 people, 131 households, and 85 families living in the city. The population density was 303.0 inhabitants per square mile (117.0/km^{2}). There were 146 housing units at an average density of 146.0 per square mile (56.4/km^{2}). The racial makeup of the city was 98.0% White, 0.3% African American, 0.3% Native American, 0.3% Asian, and 1.0% from two or more races. Hispanic or Latino of any race were 1.3% of the population.

There were 131 households, of which 30.5% had children under the age of 18 living with them, 57.3% were married couples living together, 3.8% had a female householder with no husband present, 3.8% had a male householder with no wife present, and 35.1% were non-families. 29.0% of all households were made up of individuals, and 9.9% had someone living alone who was 65 years of age or older. The average household size was 2.31 and the average family size was 2.88.

The median age in the city was 39.6 years. 23.4% of residents were under the age of 18; 8.9% were between the ages of 18 and 24; 23.1% were from 25 to 44; 28.4% were from 45 to 64; and 16.2% were 65 years of age or older. The gender makeup of the city was 51.8% male and 48.2% female.

=== 2000 census ===
As of the census of 2000, there were 340 people, 137 households, and 86 families living in the city. The population density was 592.5 inhabitants per square mile (228.8/km^{2}). There were 149 housing units at an average density of 259.7 per square mile (100.3/km^{2}). The racial makeup of the city was 98.53% White, 0.29% African American, 0.88% Native American and 0.29% Asian. Hispanic or Latino of any race were 0.88% of the population.

There were 137 households, out of which 29.9% had children under the age of 18 living with them, 59.1% were married couples living together, 3.6% had a female householder with no husband present, and 36.5% were non-families. 35.0% of all households were made up of individuals, and 18.2% had someone living alone who was 65 years of age or older. The average household size was 2.48 and the average family size was 3.24.

In the city, the population was spread out, with 26.2% under the age of 18, 9.7% from 18 to 24, 26.8% from 25 to 44, 19.1% from 45 to 64, and 18.2% who were 65 years of age or older. The median age was 38 years. For every 100 females, there were 98.8 males. For every 100 females age 18 and over, there were 90.2 males.

The median income for a household in the city was $37,212, and the median income for a family was $42,500. Males had a median income of $25,625 versus $18,854 for females. The per capita income for the city was $22,461. None of the families and 3.3% of the population were living below the poverty line, including no under eighteens and 4.5% of those over 64.

== Education ==
It is in the Southeast Valley Community School District. Southeast Valley High School in Gowrie is that district's comprehensive high school.

Harcourt was a part of the Southeast Webster-Grand Community School District, established on July 1, 2005, by the merger of the Grand Community School District and the Southeast Webster Community School District. In 2023 the Southeast Webster-Grand district merged into the Southeast Valley district.

It was previously served by the Southeast Webster Community School District, which was formed on July 1, 1991, with the merger of the Central Webster Community School District and the Dayton Community School District.
