= Dayton, Iowa =

- City
- Location of Dayton, Iowa
- Coordinates: 42°15′44″N 94°04′16″W
- Country: USA
- State: Iowa
- County: Webster

Area
  - Total: 0.85 sq mi (2.21 km^{2})
  - Land: 0.85 sq mi (2.21 km^{2})
  - Water: 0 sq mi (0.00 km^{2})
- Elevation: 1,129 ft (344 m)

Population (2020)
  - Total: 772
  - Density: 906/sq mi (349.8/km^{2})
- Time zone: UTC-6 (Central (CST))
  - Summer (DST): UTC-5 (CDT)
- ZIP code: 50530
- Area code: 515
- FIPS code: 19-19180
- GNIS feature ID: 2394472
- Website: www.daytoniowa.org

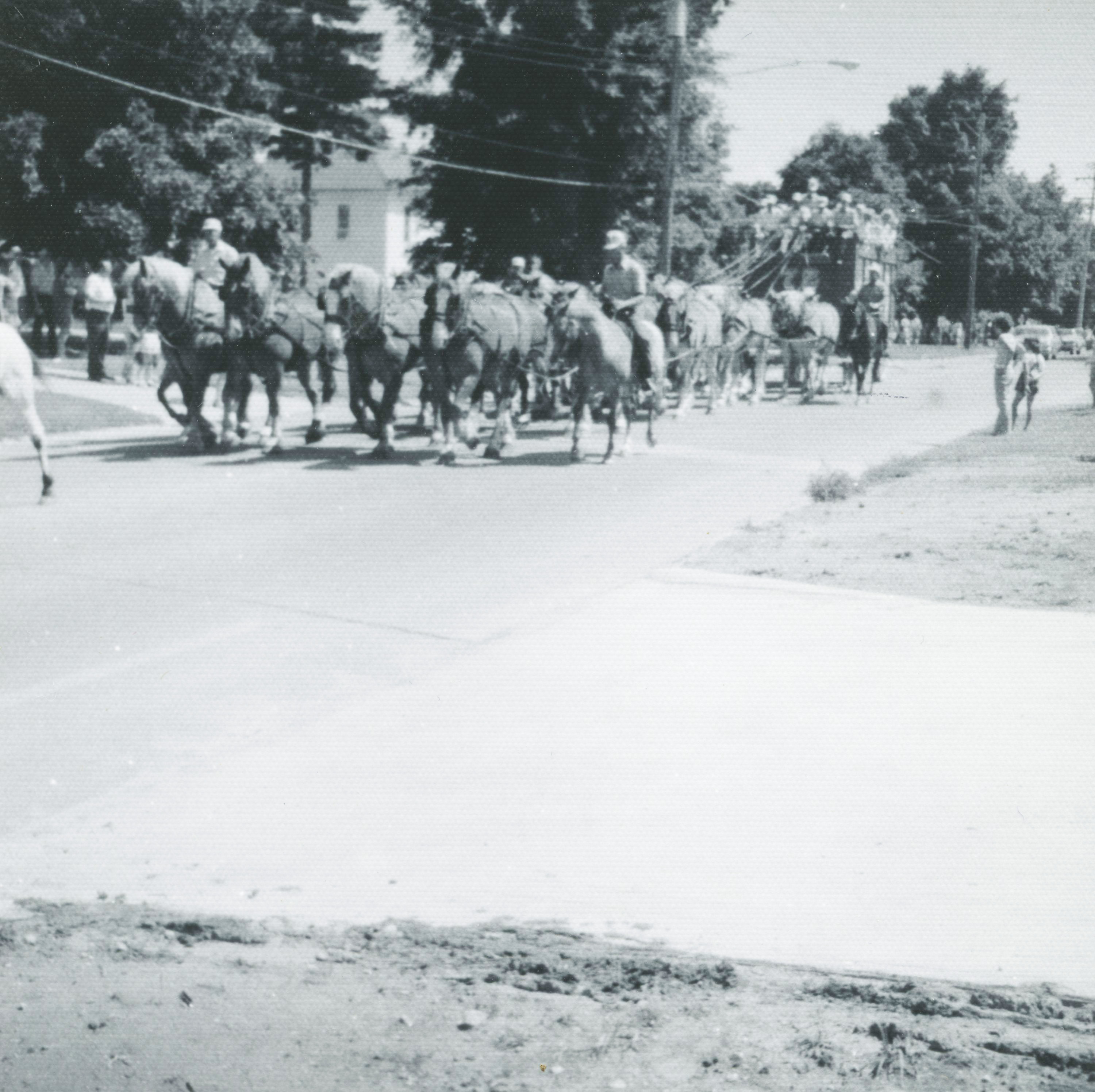
Dayton annual parade. Dayton, Iowa, 1970

Dayton is a city in Webster County, Iowa, United States. The population was 772 at the time of the 2020 census.

== History ==
A post office called Dayton has been in operation since 1877. The city was named after Dayton, Ohio.

== Geography ==
According to the United States Census Bureau, the city has a total area of 0.85 square miles (2.20 km^{2}), all land.

== Demographics ==
Historical populations
Year	Pop.	±%
1880	239	—
1890	669	+179.9%
1900	753	+12.6%
1910	717	−4.8%
1920	836	+16.6%
1930	713	−14.7%
1940	732	+2.7%
1950	793	+8.3%
1960	820	+3.4%
1970	909	+10.9%
1980	941	+3.5%
1990	818	−13.1%
2000	884	+8.1%
2010	837	−5.3%
2020	772	−7.8%
Source:"U.S. Census website". United States Census Bureau. and Iowa Data Center; Source: U.S. Decennial Census

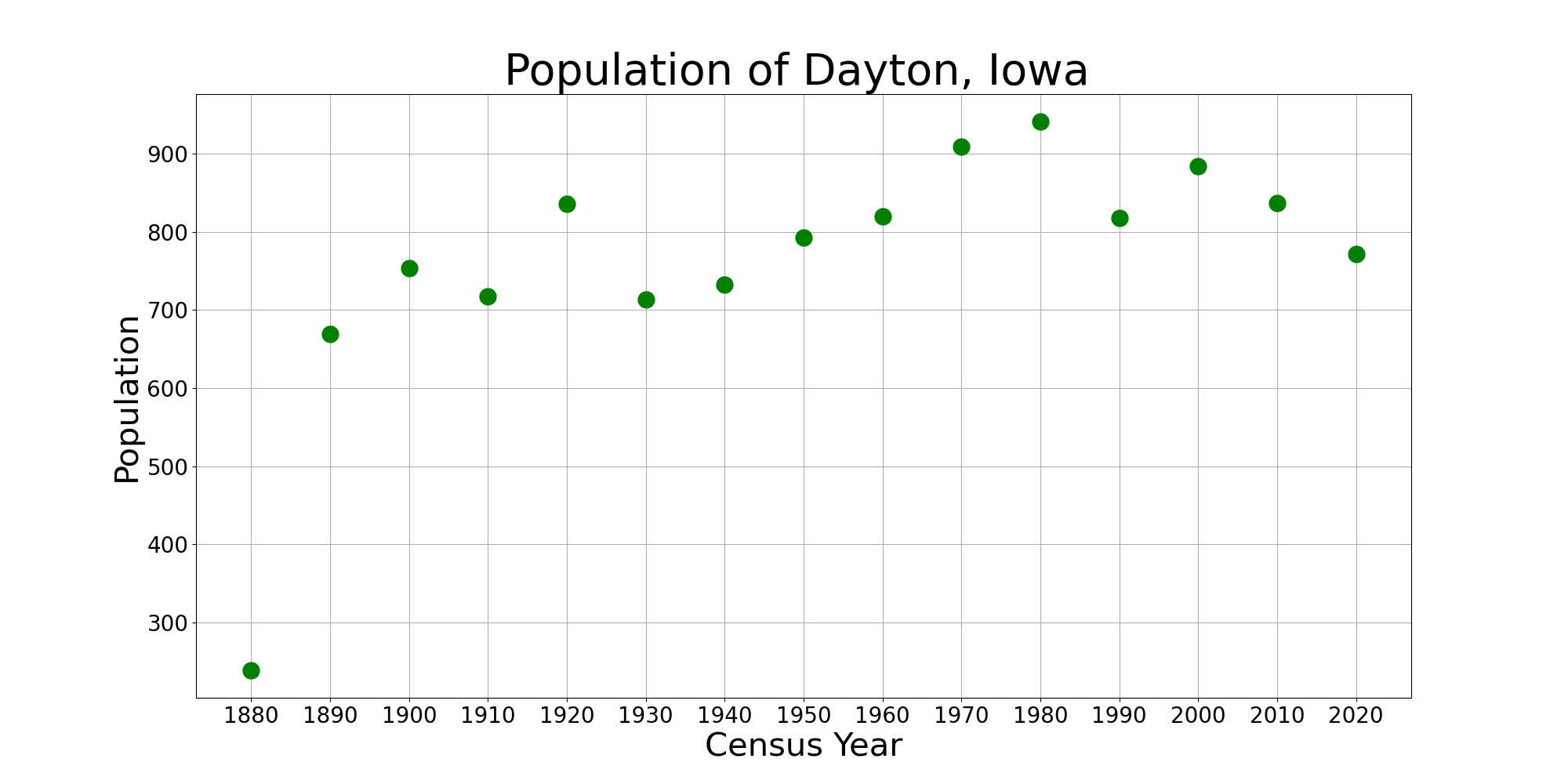
The population of Dayton, Iowa from US census data

=== 2020 census ===
As of the census of 2020, there were 772 people, 324 households, and 194 families residing in the city. The population density was 906.0 inhabitants per square mile (349.8/km^{2}). There were 366 housing units at an average density of 429.5 per square mile (165.8/km^{2}). The racial makeup of the city was 96.5% White, 0.4% Black or African American, 0.0% Native American, 0.4% Asian, 0.0% Pacific Islander, 0.4% from other races and 2.3% from two or more races. Hispanic or Latino persons of any race comprised 1.9% of the population.

Of the 324 households, 30.6% of which had children under the age of 18 living with them, 46.0% were married couples living together, 8.0% were cohabitating couples, 28.4% had a female householder with no spouse or partner present and 17.6% had a male householder with no spouse or partner present. 40.1% of all households were non-families. 33.6% of all households were made up of individuals, and 22.2% had someone living alone who was 65 years old or older.

The median age in the city was 43.2 years. 27.7% of the residents were under the age of 20; 3.5% were between the ages of 20 and 24; 22.0% were from 25 and 44; 22.8% were from 45 and 64; and 24.0% were 65 years of age or older. The gender makeup of the city was 47.8% male and 52.2% female.

=== 2010 census ===
As of the census of 2010, there were 837 people, 330 households, and 222 families living in the city. The population density was 984.7 inhabitants per square mile (380.2/km^{2}). There were 376 housing units at an average density of 442.4 per square mile (170.8/km^{2}). The racial makeup of the city was 98.7% White, 0.6% African American, 0.4% from other races, and 0.4% from two or more races. Hispanic or Latino of any race were 0.6% of the population.

There were 330 households, of which 33.6% had children under the age of 18 living with them, 51.8% were married couples living together, 9.1% had a female householder with no husband present, 6.4% had a male householder with no wife present, and 32.7% were non-families. 30.0% of all households were made up of individuals, and 16.7% had someone living alone who was 65 years of age or older. The average household size was 2.43 and the average family size was 2.95.

The median age in the city was 42.2 years. 26% of residents were under the age of 18; 6.7% were between the ages of 18 and 24; 22.2% were from 25 to 44; 23.3% were from 45 to 64; and 21.9% were 65 years of age or older. The gender makeup of the city was 50.9% male and 49.1% female.

=== 2000 census ===
As of the census of 2000, there were 884 people, 354 households, and 235 families living in the city. The population density was 1,062.8 inhabitants per square mile (410.3/km^{2}). There were 379 housing units at an average density of 455.7 per square mile (175.9/km^{2}). The racial makeup of the city was 98.42% White, 0.11% African American, 0.11% Native American, 0.23% Asian, 0.45% from other races, and 0.68% from two or more races. Hispanic or Latino of any race were 0.34% of the population.

There were 354 households, out of which 29.9% had children under the age of 18 living with them, 53.4% were married couples living together, 9.3% had a female householder with no husband present, and 33.6% were non-families. 30.2% of all households were made up of individuals, and 15.5% had someone living alone who was 65 years of age or older. The average household size was 2.38 and the average family size was 2.91.

24.8% were under the age of 18, 7.6% from 18 to 24, 24.2% from 25 to 44, 18.1% from 45 to 64, and 25.3% were 65 years of age or older. The median age was 40 years. For every 100 females, there were 91.3 males. For every 100 females age 18 and over, there were 87.3 males.

The median income for a household in the city was $33,864, and the median income for a family was $38,698. Males had a median income of $30,952 versus $20,208 for females. The per capita income for the city was $15,714. About 13.9% of families and 11.5% of the population were below the poverty line, including 15.8% of those under age 18 and 6.1% of those age 65 or over.

== Annual events ==
Since 1937, Dayton has been the site of a rodeo on Labor Day weekend. It began with a pair of local cowboys and has grown to a National Championship Rodeo, sanctioned by the Professional Rodeo Cowboys Association. The rodeo features bareback riding, saddle bronc riding, bull riding, calf roping, team roping, steer wrestling, barrel racing, and the wild horse race. The rodeo has generated large crowds and high quality competitors. The rodeo features many types of domestic beers and American fare.

== Education ==
It is in the Southeast Valley Community School District. The district operates Dayton Elementary School in Dayton. The district also operates Southeast Valley Middle School in Burnside and Southeast Valley High School in Gowrie.

Dayton was formerly a part of the Southeast Webster-Grand Community School District, established on July 1, 2005 by the merger of the Grand Community School District and the Southeast Webster Community School District. In 2023 that district merged into the Southeast Valley district.

Dayton was previously served by the Southeast Webster Community School District, which was formed on July 1, 1991 with the merger of the Central Webster Community School District and the Dayton Community School District.
