= Decatur, Nebraska =

Village in Nebraska, US

- Village
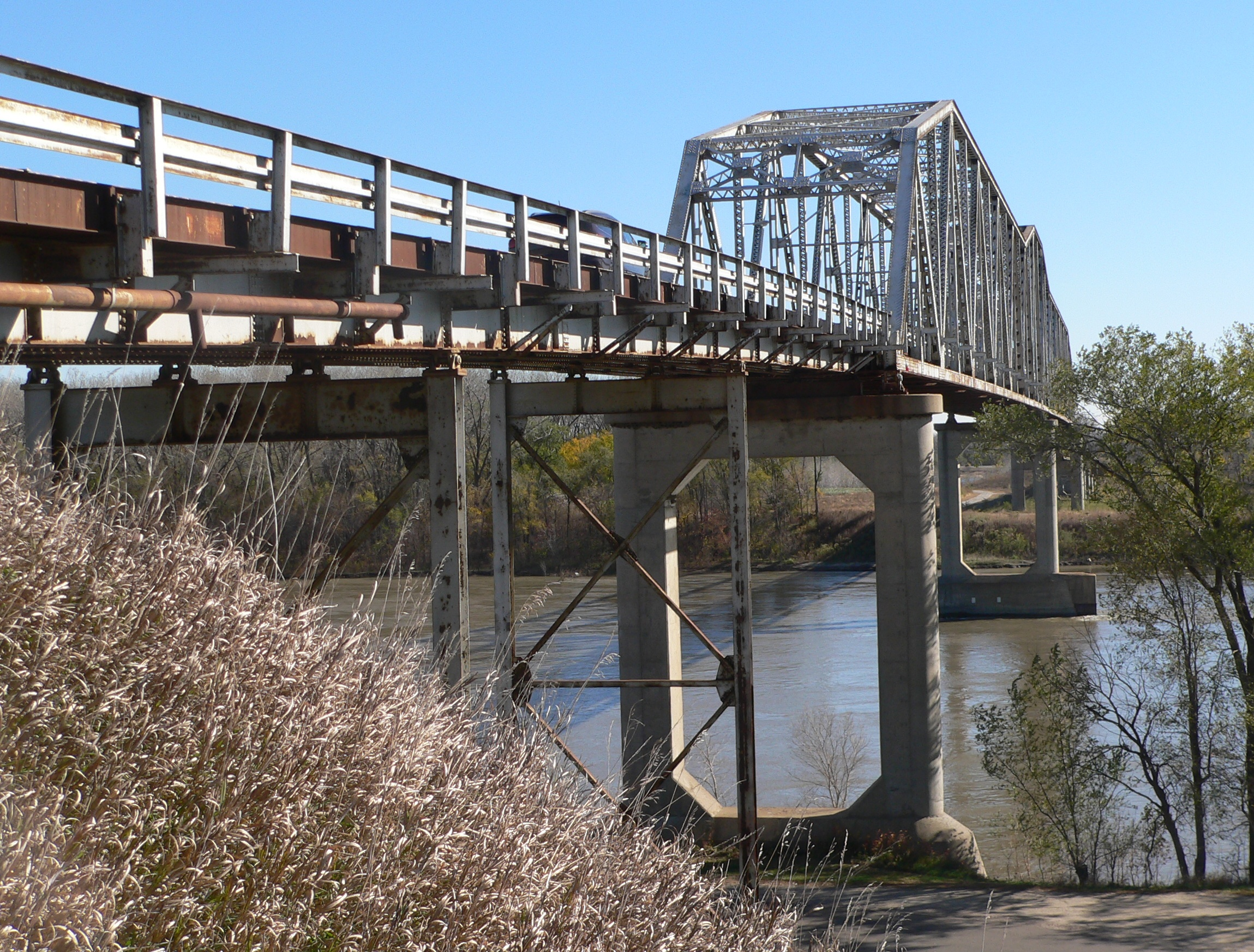
- A bridge at Decatur crosses the Missouri River into Iowa

- Location of Decatur, Nebraska
- Coordinates: 42°00′21″N 96°14′59″W
- Country: United States
- State: Nebraska
- County: Burt

Area
  - Total: 1.02 sq mi (2.65 km^{2})
  - Land: 1.02 sq mi (2.64 km^{2})
  - Water: 0 sq mi (0.00 km^{2})
- Elevation: 1,066 ft (325 m)

Population (2020)
  - Total: 410
  - Density: 401.6/sq mi (155.06/km^{2})
- Time zone: UTC-6 (Central (CST))
  - Summer (DST): UTC-5 (CDT)
- ZIP code: 68020
- Area code: 402
- FIPS code: 31-12525
- GNIS feature ID: 2398700
- Website: ci.decatur.ne.us

Decatur is a village in Burt County, Nebraska, United States, adjacent to the upper Missouri River. As of the 2020 census, Decatur had a population of 410. This town is named after one of its incorporators, Stephen Decatur. It developed around a trading post established by Colonel Peter Sarpy, the namesake for Sarpy County in the state.

== History ==
The area was long occupied by the Omaha Native Americans, who settled along the creeks and river Explorers Meriwether Lewis and William Clark passed through the area in 1804 as their expedition traveled via the upper Missouri River on their way to and from the Pacific Coast, in their exploration of the Louisiana Purchase.

The first European settler in the area was a man named Woods, who settled at the mouth of Wood Creek (his namesake) in 1837. Stephen Decatur arrived in the area in 1841. A former schoolteacher in New Jersey and New York, he had abandoned his wife and two children when he migrated to the West. Here he changed his name, dropping his former surname of "Bross." His farm was called Decatur Springs, after a spring which supplied water to the village for the next century.

In 1854, the U.S. Commissioner of Indian Affairs purchased 300,000 acres of land from the Omaha, including the area which is now Decatur. The town of Decatur was incorporated in 1856 under the name "The Decatur Townsite & Ferry Company." The other incorporators included Thomas Whiteacre, T. H. Hineman, George Mason, and Herman Glass. Peter Sarpy helped lay out the town, which developed around his Indian trading post at the mouth of Wood Creek. He also owned Fontenelle's Post and is the namesake for Sarpy County.

The patents for the town were granted by the legislature on May 1, 1862. Following the dissolution of the Decatur Townsite and Ferry Company, the town was renamed Decatur Village in 1858.

== Geography ==
According to the United States Census Bureau, the village has a total area of 0.90 square miles (2.33 km^{2}), all land.

== Demographics ==
Historical population
Census	Pop.	Note	%±
1880	533		—
1890	593		11.3%
1900	800		34.9%
1910	782		−2.2%
1920	657		−16.0%
1930	683		4.0%
1940	905		32.5%
1950	808		−10.7%
1960	786		−2.7%
1970	679		−13.6%
1980	723		6.5%
1990	641		−11.3%
2000	618		−3.6%
2010	481		−22.2%
2020	410		−14.8%
U.S. Decennial Census

=== 2010 census ===
As of the census of 2010, there were 481 people, 240 households, and 136 families residing in the village. The population density was 534.4 inhabitants per square mile (206.3/km^{2}). There were 275 housing units at an average density of 305.6 per square mile (118.0/km^{2}). The racial makeup of the village was 89.0% White, 0.6% African American, 7.1% Native American, 0.2% Asian, 1.0% from other races, and 2.1% from two or more races. Hispanic or Latino of any race were 1.7% of the population.

There were 240 households, of which 20.0% had children under the age of 18 living with them, 42.5% were married couples living together, 7.1% had a female householder with no husband present, 7.1% had a male householder with no wife present, and 43.3% were non-families. 38.8% of all households were made up of individuals, and 21.7% had someone living alone who was 65 years of age or older. The average household size was 2.00 and the average family size was 2.62.

The median age in the village was 52.9 years. 17% of residents were under the age of 18; 4.2% were between the ages of 18 and 24; 16% were from 25 to 44; 37% were from 45 to 64; and 25.8% were 65 years of age or older. The gender makeup of the village was 48.6% male and 51.4% female.

=== 2000 census ===
As of the census of 2000, there were 618 people, 278 households, and 180 families residing in the village. The population density was 681.4 inhabitants per square mile (263.1/km^{2}). There were 368 housing units at an average density of 405.8 per square mile (156.7/km^{2}). The racial makeup of the village was 87.70% White, 0.65% African American, 7.93% Native American, 0.32% Asian, and 3.40% from two or more races. Hispanic or Latino of any race were 0.81% of the population.

There were 278 households, out of which 26.6% had children under the age of 18 living with them, 52.5% were married couples living together, 7.2% had a female householder with no husband present, and 34.9% were non-families. 33.1% of all households were made up of individuals, and 17.3% had someone living alone who was 65 years of age or older. The average household size was 2.22 and the average family size was 2.80.

In the village, the population was spread out, with 23.5% under the age of 18, 4.5% from 18 to 24, 22.7% from 25 to 44, 28.3% from 45 to 64, and 21.0% who were 65 years of age or older. The median age was 45 years. For every 100 females, there were 97.4 males. For every 100 females age 18 and over, there were 89.2 males.

As of 2000 the median income for a household in the village was $30,125, and the median income for a family was $37,857. Males had a median income of $25,938 versus $20,114 for females. The per capita income for the village was $14,118. About 8.0% of families and 9.4% of the population were below the poverty line, including 8.0% of those under age 18 and 12.9% of those age 65 or over.
