= National Register of Historic Places listings in Sac County, Iowa =

Location of Sac County in Iowa

This is a list of the National Register of Historic Places listings in Sac County, Iowa.

This is intended to be a complete list of the properties and districts on the National Register of Historic Places in Sac County, Iowa, United States. Latitude and longitude coordinates are provided for many National Register properties and districts; these locations may be seen together in a map.

There are 13 properties and districts listed on the National Register in the county.

This National Park Service list is complete through NPS recent listings posted December 12, 2025.

== Current listings ==
	Name on the Register	Image	Date listed	Location	City or town	Description
1	Blackhawk State Park, Wildlife Preserve Area (Area A)	Blackhawk State Park, Wildlife Preserve Area (Area A)	November 15, 1990 (#90001678)	South of the junction of U.S. Route 71 and County Highway M68; 42°17′54″N 95°02′51″W	Lake View	
2	Blackhawk State Park, Black Hawk Preserve (Area B)	Blackhawk State Park, Black Hawk Preserve (Area B)	November 15, 1990 (#90001679)	South of the junction of U.S. Route 71 and County Highway M68; 42°18′05″N 95°02′34″W	Lake View	
3	Blackhawk State Park, Denison Beach Area (Area C)	Blackhawk State Park, Denison Beach Area (Area C)	November 15, 1990 (#90001680)	South of the junction of U.S. Route 71 and County Highway M68; 42°18′08″N 95°02′09″W	Lake View	
4	Chautauqua Park Historic District	Chautauqua Park Historic District	February 5, 2014 (#13001138)	106 Park Ave. 42°25′14″N 94°59′05″W	Sac City	
5	Chicago and North Western Passenger Depot		May 9, 2003 (#03000358)	3727 Perkins Ave. 42°16′13″N 95°05′23″W	Wall Lake	
6	Chief Black Hawk Statue	Chief Black Hawk Statue	May 26, 2000 (#00000532)	Crescent Park Dr. 42°18′31″N 95°02′33″W	Lake View	
7	Lakeside Park Historic District	Lakeside Park Historic District	December 23, 1991 (#91001841)	3rd St. from Lake to Park St. 42°18′23″N 95°02′46″W	Lake View	
8	Park Hotel	Park Hotel	January 17, 2017 (#100000491)	115 N. West State St. 42°25′20″N 94°59′19″W	Sac City	
9	George and Lola Perkins House	George and Lola Perkins House	January 26, 2016 (#15000997)	803 W. Main St. 42°25′19″N 94°59′35″W	Sac City	
10	Sac City Chicago and North Western Depot	Sac City Chicago and North Western Depot	January 26, 2016 (#15000998)	103 N. 13th St. 42°25′23″N 94°59′58″W	Sac City	
11	Sac City Monument Square Historic District	Sac City Monument Square Historic District	May 4, 2015 (#15000193)	400 W. Main St. 42°25′18″N 94°59′17″W	Sac City	
12	Sac County Courthouse	Sac County Courthouse	July 2, 1981 (#81000268)	Main St. 42°25′21″N 94°59′17″W	Sac City	
13	Seven Oaks	Seven Oaks	March 7, 1996 (#96000236)	707 Audubon St. 42°25′16″N 94°59′33″W	Sac City	

== See also ==
- List of National Historic Landmarks in Iowa
- National Register of Historic Places listings in Iowa
- Listings in neighboring counties: Buena Vista, Calhoun, Carroll, Cherokee, Crawford, Ida, Pocahontas
