= Black Hawk Lake =

Black Hawk Lake or Blackhawk Lake may refer to:

- Black Hawk Lake (Sac County, Iowa), a glacially-formed lake
- Blackhawk Lake (Minnesota), a lake in Dakota County
