= Chief Black Hawk Statue =

- U.S. National Register of Historic Places
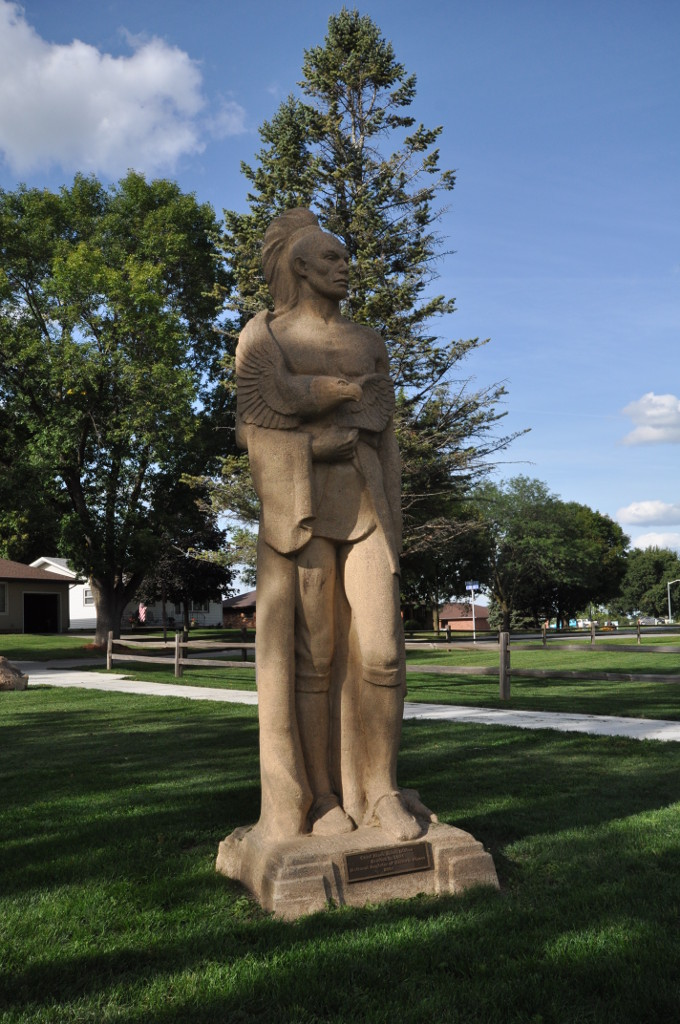

- Location within Iowa Location within the United States
- Location: Crescent Park Dr. Lake View, Iowa
- Coordinates: 42°18′31″N 95°02′34″W
- Built: 1934
- Architect: Harry E. Stinson; Carl J. Ludwig
- NRHP reference No.: 00000532
- Added to NRHP: May 26, 2000

The Chief Black Hawk Statue is a sculpture of Black Hawk in Lake View, Iowa, United States. Sac County is named for the Sauk people, Sac being a variant of Sauk. Lake View is located on Black Hawk Lake, which is named after the renowned Sauk war leader. These names came about as Euro-Americans had a tendency to romanticize Native American peoples who they vanquished in the process of westward expansion. Because neither the county nor the lake were within the Sauk people's territory, it is doubtful that they or Black Hawk ever visited this area.

Dr. E.E. Speaker and the Lake View Commercial Club sought to have the statue created in 1932 in conjunction with the effort to establish Black Hawk State Park on the shore of what was then named Wall Lake. Harry E. Stinson, a sculptor and associate professor at the University of Iowa, was chosen to create the statue. After choosing Crescent Park as the location of the statue, Stinson created a 3-foot (0.91 m) model based on the body of a university student and the face of Moses Slick, a Native American from Tama, Iowa. The project became the foundation for the Public Works of Art Project in Iowa, which was funded by the Civil Works Administration, a New Deal program during the Great Depression. Based on this project, the University of Iowa created guidelines for other towns in the state who wanted to participate in the program. The city of Lake View also contributed to the effort, and the Civilian Conservation Corps prepared and landscaped the site. The statue was dedicated on September 3, 1934, Labor Day, in a ceremony where the name of the lake was changed from Wall Lake to Black Hawk Lake. The finished statue is slightly different from the model with the features being narrower and sharper. It references Charles Bird King's painting of Black Hawk from in 1837. The statue was listed on the National Register of Historic Places in 2000.
