= Samuel A. Stouffer =

American sociologist

- Prof. Stouffer
- Born: June 6, 1900; Sac City, Iowa
- Died: August 24, 1960 (aged 60)
- Education: University of Chicago
- Scientific career
- Fields: Sociology
- Workplaces: University of Chicago; Harvard University
- Doctoral advisor: Herbert Blumer

Samuel Andrew Stouffer (June 6, 1900 – August 24, 1960) was a prominent American sociologist and developer of survey research techniques. Stouffer spent much of his career attempting to answer the fundamental question: How does one measure an attitude?

Stouffer served as a professor of sociology at both the University of Chicago and Harvard University, and also directed the Laboratory of Social Relations at Harvard.

== Biography ==
Born in Sac City, Iowa, Stouffer received a Bachelor of Arts at Morningside College, Sioux City in 1921, then went on to earn a Master of Arts in English at Harvard University in 1923. He returned to Sac City in 1923 to manage and edit his father's newspaper, the Sac Sun, until 1926 when he sold it and started his doctoral studies. During that time, he married Ruth McBurney in 1924, with whom he had three children. Stouffer earned his PhD in sociology in 1930 at the University of Chicago. His dissertation was “An Experimental Comparison of Statistical and Case-History Methods of Attitude Research,” supervised by Herbert Blumer. He then served as a professor of sociology, statistics, and social statistics at universities such as the University of Chicago, the University of London, and the University of Wisconsin–Madison.

== Principal works ==
=== Studies in Social Psychology in World War II: The American Soldier ===
(Princeton University Press, 1949).

Stouffer and a distinguished team of social scientists working for the War Department surveyed over a half million American soldiers during World War II using interviews, over two hundred questionnaires, and other techniques to determine their attitudes on everything from racial integration to their officers’ performance. Their answers, almost always complex and often also counterintuitive, reveal individuals both defining and defined by their society and their primary groups. Stouffer's work in World War II led to the Expert and Combat Infantryman Badges, revision of pay scales, the demobilization point system, and influenced what appeared in Yank, the Army Weekly, Stars & Stripes, and Frank Capra's “Why We Fight” propaganda films. Additionally, it was Stouffer and his colleagues who during their research for The American Soldier developed the important sociological concept of “relative deprivation”, which roughly stated is the idea that one determines his status based on comparison with others.

The research was published in 4 volumes:

1. Volume I, The American Soldier: Adjustment During Army Life
2. Volume II, The American Soldier: Combat and Its Aftermath
3. Volume III, Experiments on Mass Communication
4. Volume IV, Measurement and Prediction

After Stouffer's death, the punch cards for the unclassified surveys used in The American Soldier were digitized by the Roper Center and are now available from the US National Archives; for details, see "A Finding Aid to Records Relating to Personal Participation in World War II (The American Soldier" Surveys)". Microfilms of the soldiers' handwritten responses to the survey questions are also held by the US National Archives and by 2019 were digitized as images so that they could be transcribed for full-text searching. Historian Edward Gitre wrote of this project:

The handwritten commentaries the researchers preserved — photographed in 1947, and amounting to some 65,000 pages — capture for posterity converging and diverging plotlines that ran through the same organization. [... W]ith the indispensable help of volunteer citizen-archivists on the 1.7 million member Zooniverse crowdsourcing platform, the entire collection of now-digitized commentaries are being transcribed, so the public can finally access and read them.

A 2013 book by Joseph W. Ryan, Samuel Stouffer and the GI Survey: Sociologists and Soldiers during the Second World War has been recommended "for those seeking an understanding of the World War II roots of modern opinion polling, an examination of the effects the GI Survey had on wartime operations, and an analysis of the place of The American Soldier in the historiography of sociology." It is an expanded version of his 2009 thesis ("What Were They Thinking? Samuel A. Stouffer and The American Soldier", Ryan 2009).

=== Communism, Conformity & Civil Liberties: A Cross Section of the Nation Speaks its Mind ===
(Doubleday & Co., 1955).

In the summer of 1954, 500 interviewers under Professor Stouffer's supervision polled a cross section of 6000 Americans to determine their attitudes on nonconformist behavior. Through both anecdotal and highly disciplined research data, Stouffer illuminated the attitudes of Americans to nonconformist behavior in general, and to what liberals considered the intolerance of the McCarthy Era in particular. Although he found no “national neurosis”, what he did find was that Americans remained mostly concerned about their day-to-day existence – an important discovery in the face of an increasingly mass-culture society. He also found differing levels of tolerance based on socio-economic factors.

Among his other major works is Social Research to Test Ideas, (The Free Press, 1962).

== Activities ==
Professor Stouffer was a delegate to the International Conference on Population in Paris, 1938, President of the American Sociological Society 1952-3, President of the American Association of Public Opinion Research 1953-54, a member of the American Academy of Arts and Sciences, the American Philosophical Association, the American Philosophical Society, Phi Beta Kappa, the American Statistical Association, the Sociological Research Association, the Institute of Mathematical Statistics, the Population Association of America, the Psychometric Association, the Harvard Club and Cosmos Club.

He also consulted with scores of private and public institutes, a partial listing of which includes:

- American Standards Association,
- Cooperative Test Service of the American Council on Education,
- University of California,
- American Economic Association,
- Population Association of America,
- Atomic Scientists of Chicago,
- National Committee on Atomic Information,
- The American Psychoanalytic Association.

== Personality ==
Stouffer is described by his family and those who knew him well as a gentleman of warmth, compassion, restless energy, high standards, depth, and a puckish sense of humor. His academic lectures, through which he often chain-smoked, were littered with allusions and quotations from Shakespeare, and these were often accompanied by baseball statistics. Deeply intellectually curious and impatient for survey results, Stouffer frequently sat by the IBM punched card sifting machine to see the raw answers to his queries. (These traits help to explain how he produced the classic Communism, Conformity and Civil Liberties so quickly). In his few free hours he favored Mickey Spillane novels and listening to baseball on the radio. His correspondence reveals a clear thinking pragmatist with a deep sense of responsibility to his society and to his profession. As James Davis writes in the introduction to Communism, Conformity and Civil Liberties (reprinted in 1992 by Transaction Publishers, New Brunswick), “Sam was a great sociologist….”

== Legacy ==
Samuel Stouffer's influence reaches well beyond military history and sociology. His work is cited in journals as diverse as Child Development Abstract, The Journal of Abnormal and Social Psychology, and Commentary. His research has had a lasting effect on polling procedures and analysis, market research and interpretation, race relations, population and nuclear policies, education, and economics. Additionally, his clear, honest writing style, free of unexplained jargon and “bureaucratese”, remains a model of the simple, elegant use of the English language.

He also originated `Stouffer's Method' for calculating the significance of a combined result. If N individual p-values are expressed as their equivalent number of standard deviations from the normal distribution, then the combined number of standard deviations is the total divided by $\sqrt N$. This appears as an obscure footnote in "The American Soldier: Vol I" but is now in widespread use.
