= Lakeside Park Historic District =

Historic district in Iowa, United States

- U.S. National Register of Historic Places
- U.S. Historic district
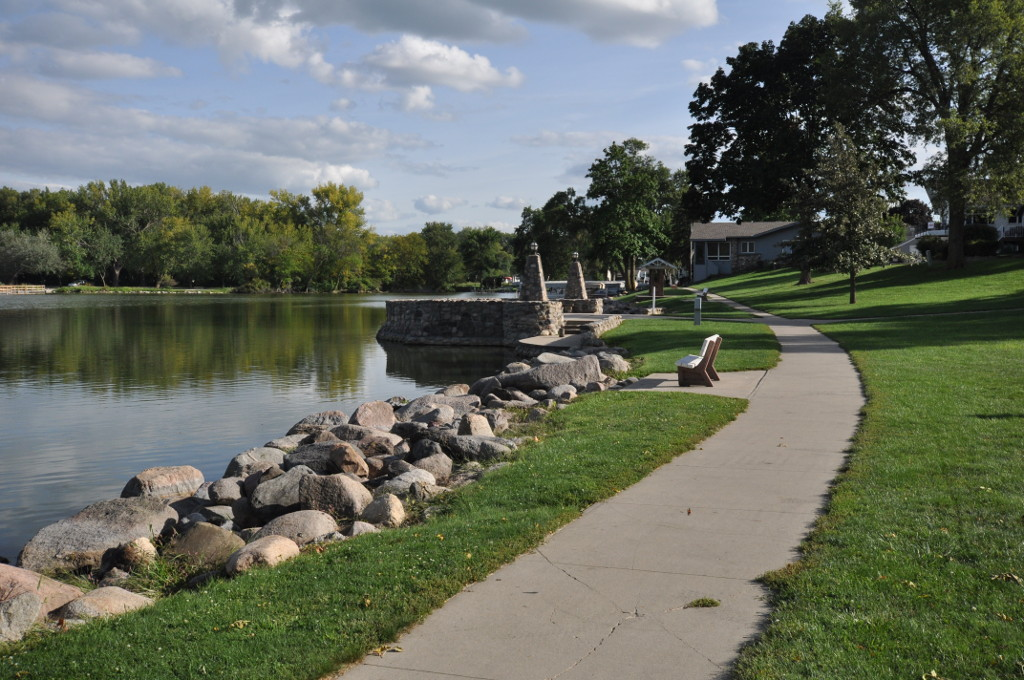

- Location within Iowa Location within the United States
- Location: 3rd St. from Lake to Park St., Lake View, Iowa
- Coordinates: 42°18′23″N 95°02′48″W
- Area: approximately 3 acres (1.2 ha)
- Built: 1935
- Architectural style: Park Rustic
- MPS: CCC Properties in Iowa State Parks MPS
- NRHP reference No.: 91001841
- Added to NRHP: December 23, 1991

Lakeside Park Historic District, also known as The Stone Piers, is a nationally recognized historic district located in Lake View, Iowa, United States. It was listed on the National Register of Historic Places in 1991. At the time of its nomination it consisted of four resources, which were all structures. When Civilian Conservation Corps (CCC) Company VCCC 1776 was in town to develop Black Hawk State Park it also developed this municipal park as well. They built a rip rap berm for a seawall and two piers, and then filled in with dirt behind them to create the park. Both of the piers are constructed in the Park Rustic style that utilized uncoursed rough fieldstone from farms in the area. The west pier is U-shaped and extends roughly 34 feet (10 m) into the water. Two obelisk-like light posts are located at the entrance of the pier. The north pier is elongated and extends 82 feet (25 m) into the water. At its base is a broken circle of three stone and concrete benches. This pier is narrower than the other, and ends with a circular base that surrounds a tapered electric light shaft. The Park Rustic style is meant to blend into its natural surroundings. The rip rap seawall and the piers appear to emerge naturally from the shoreline.

There is also a brick mineral spring pavilion that predates the CCC-built amenities. It looks a bit like a wishing well, and marks the site of a popular mineral spring. At one time it featured a hand pump over the spring's well, but it has subsequently been removed. The well has been covered with concrete and the pump replaced with a park bench.
