= Swan Lake (Carroll County, Iowa) =

- Location within Iowa Location within the United States

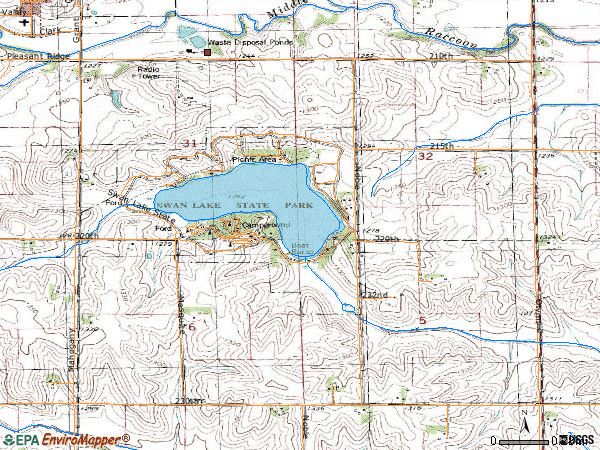
- United States Environmental Protection Agency
- Location: Carroll County, Iowa, United States
- Coordinates: 42°02′01″N 94°50′25″W
- Type: reservoir
- Primary inflows: unnamed tributary to the Middle Raccoon River
- Primary outflows: unnamed tributary to the Middle Raccoon River
- Basin countries: United States
- Surface area: 116 acres (0.5 km^{2})
- Surface elevation: 1,263 ft (385 m)

Swan Lake is a 116-acre (0.5 km^{2}) reservoir on an unnamed tributary of the Middle Raccoon River, just south and east of Carroll, Iowa. It is the southern terminus of the Sauk Rail Trail, a path linking the lake to Black Hawk State Park in Sac County.

== Sources ==
- Iowa Department of Natural Resources
- Statistics
- U.S. Geological Survey Geographic Names Information System: Swan Lake
- Hypsography (Iowa State University)
- Sauk Rail Trail
- Iowa State University
- Travel Iowa
