= George B. Perkins =

American politician (1874–1955)

George B. Perkins (August 11, 1874 – October 4, 1955) was an American businessman and politician.

Born in Fond du Lac, Wisconsin, Perkins went to the Fond du Lac public schools. In 1896, Perkins moved to Sac City, Iowa. He was the president of the First National Bank of Sac City. Perkins served as mayor of Sac City. He also served on the Sac City Independent School District board and served as the school board treasurer. Perkins also served as clerk of courts for Sac County, Iowa. From 1919 to 1923, Perkins served in the Iowa House of Representatives and was a Republican. He then served in the Iowa State Senate from 1923 to 1927. Perkins died at Loring Hospital in Sac City, Iowa following a heart attack.
