= Sac City Monument Square Historic District =

Historic district in Iowa, United States

- U.S. National Register of Historic Places
- U.S. Historic district
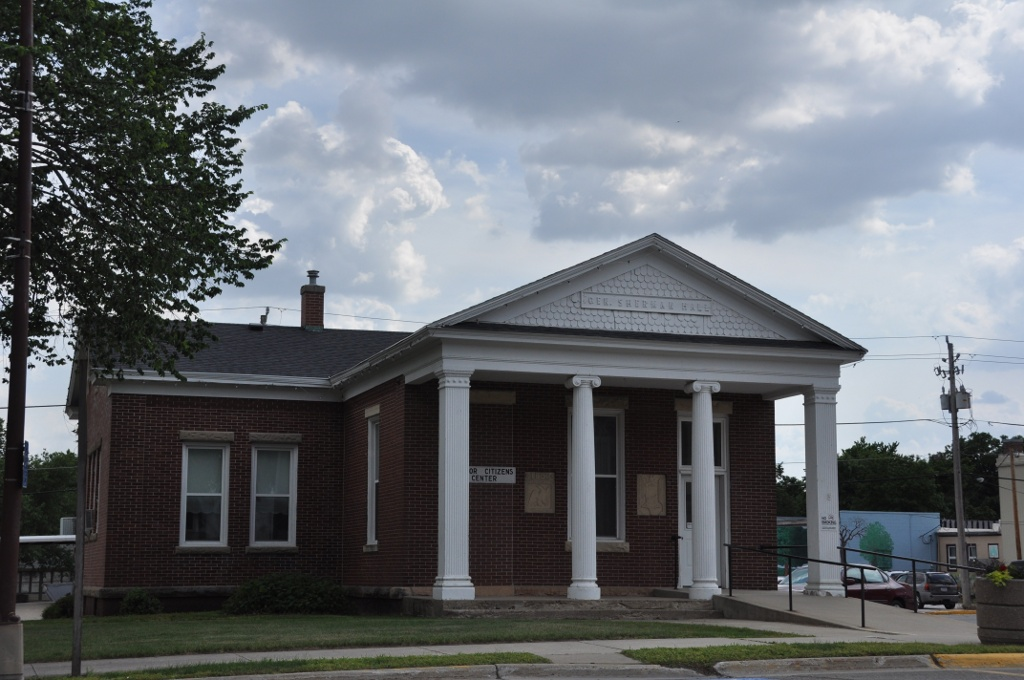
- General Sherman Hall

- Location within Iowa Location within the United States
- Location: 400 W. Main St. Sac City, Iowa
- Coordinates: 42°25′18″N 94°59′17″W
- Architect: Maurice J. Power
- Architectural style: Classical Revival
- NRHP reference No.: 15000193
- Added to NRHP: May 4, 2015

Sac City Monument Square Historic District is a nationally recognized historic district located in Sac City, Iowa, United States. It was listed on the National Register of Historic Places in 2015. The square consists of the General Sherman Hall (1892), Memorial Statue (1894), the American Legion Hall (1922), four World War II era Howitzers, and three granite tablets that commemorate the lives of the soldiers from Sac County who fought in World War I, World War II, the Korean War, and the Vietnam War. The Vietnam War tablet does not contribute to the historic district because it is a more recent installation.

The Neoclassical General Sherman Hall was built by the local Grand Army of the Republic (GAR) post. Organized in 1884 as Sac City Post No. 284, its name was changed in 1891 to the General Sherman Post in honor of William Tecumseh Sherman, who had died earlier that year. In 1873 the present Sac County Courthouse was completed a half block north of the former courthouse to eliminate the turns around the city square. The local GAR acquired the half-block property that remained as Monument Square for a soldier's monument and a hall to honor General Sherman. The buildings served as a meeting hall for the General Sherman Post, the Women's Relief Corps, and Sons of Veterans. The soldier's monument was the work of New York sculptor Maurice J. Power.

The American Legion Cantigny Post No. 195 was organized in Sac City in 1919. They bought property that overlooked Monument Square for a meeting hall and memorial, and the Neoclassical structure was completed in 1922. The Veterans of Foreign Wars (V.F.W.) Post 590 of Sac City erected the three granite tablets to commemorate the local soldiers who served in the four 20th-century conflicts. The larger tablet memorializes the soldiers from World War I and World War II. The two smaller tablets commemorate the Korean and Vietnam conflicts.
