= Park Hotel (Sac City, Iowa) =

- U.S. National Register of Historic Places
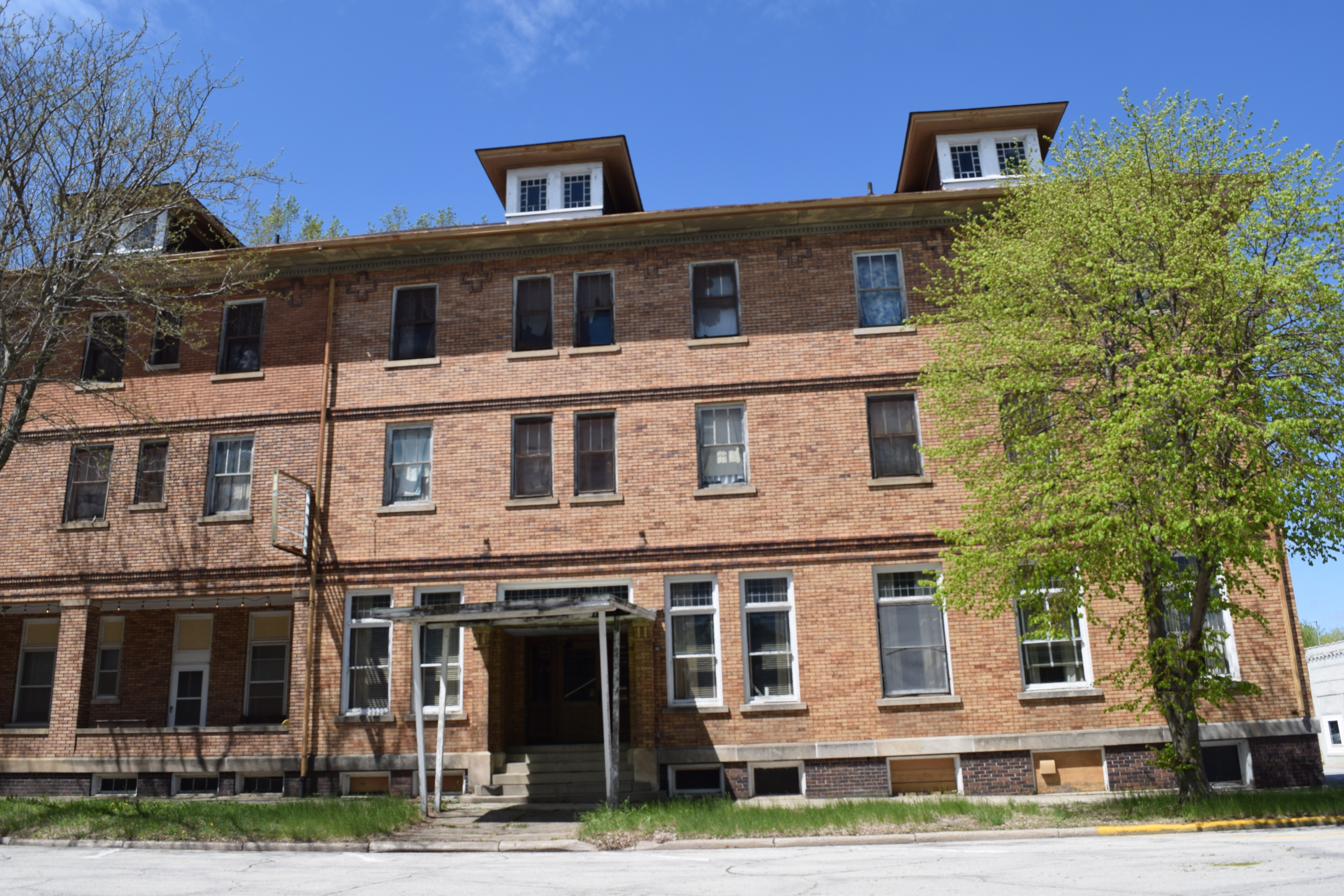

- Location within Iowa Location within the United States
- Location: 115 N. West State St. Sac City, Iowa
- Coordinates: 42°25′21.8″N 94°59′19.9″W
- Area: Less than one acre
- Built: 1912
- Built by: Park Brothers
- Architect: Unger and Park
- Architectural style: Late 19th and early 20th century American Movements
- NRHP reference No.: 100000491
- Added to NRHP: January 17, 2017

The Park Hotel is a historic building located in Sac City, Iowa, United States. The three-story, brick structure was designed by the Storm Lake, Iowa, architectural firm of Unger and Parks and built by Parks Construction, also of Storm Lake. The building was completed in 1912 and enlarged in 1917. Before its construction, Sac City had several food and lodging establishments but it lacked a quality hotel.

The present building was built next to a wood-frame Park Hotel that was built in 1860. Sac City’s Commercial Club was instrumental in raising the capital to build the new Park Hotel. D. M. Farmer, who owned the old hotel, took ownership of the new one as well, and paid off the Commercial Club. He managed the hotel until 1920 when Edwin Boss of the Boss Hotel group took over for eight years. The Farmer family, however, maintained ownership of the hotel until 1962. The building remained a hotel until 1980 when Marie Ramstad bought it for her home and music studio. She died in 2016 and her daughters took ownership of the building. It was listed on the National Register of Historic Places in 2017.
