= Scott Stanzel =

American political advisor (born 1973)

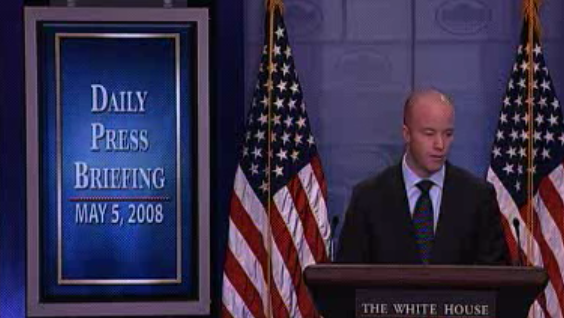

White House Deputy Press Secretary
- In office September 2006 – January 2009
- President: George W. Bush
- Leader: Dana Perino
- Succeeded by: Bill Burton

Personal details
- Born: January 15, 1973 (age 53) Sac City, Iowa, U.S.
- Education: Iowa State University (BA)

Scott Michael Stanzel (born January 15, 1973) is an American political advisor who served as deputy assistant to the president and deputy press secretary in the George W. Bush administration from September 2006 to January 2009. After leaving government service, Stanzel has been employed by Microsoft and Amazon. He now works for Capital One as managing vice president of corporate communications.

== Early life and education ==
Stanzel is the son of Ned and Chelon Stanzel, and was raised in Sac City, Iowa, where his father raised cattle and hogs. He graduated from Sac Community High School in 1991 and earned a bachelor's degree in Journalism from Iowa State University in 1995. He is a member of Phi Delta Theta fraternity and served as president of the Iowa Gamma chapter while attending Iowa State.

== Career ==
Upon graduating from college, Stanzel went to work for the 1996 Bob Dole presidential campaign as the Northwest Iowa Field Representative. Following Dole's victory in the 1996 Iowa Republican caucuses, Stanzel was recruited to serve as the Deputy Finance Director for Jim Ross Lightfoot's unsuccessful campaign for U.S. Senate. In January 1997, he was hired as the Assistant Press Secretary for U.S. Senator Chuck Grassley (R-IA).

In September 1999, Stanzel left the Grassley's senate office to work for the George W. Bush 2000 presidential campaign. After serving in communications roles in several primary states, at the campaign headquarters in Austin, Texas, and on the Florida recount team in Tallahassee, Florida, Stanzel was selected to be a spokesman for the Bush-Cheney Transition Team. When Bush was inaugurated in January 2001, Stanzel was asked to become a White House spokesman. He served in the White House Office of Media Affairs, where he was the primary spokesman for Bush for reporters serving news outlets in 14 Midwestern and industrial belt states.

In August 2003, Stanzel became the press secretary of the George W. Bush 2004 presidential campaign, traveled with Bush to campaign events throughout the country and serving as national campaign spokesman to television, radio, newspaper and wire reporters covering the campaign. After Bush's election victory, Stanzel became a senior communications advisor to the 55th Presidential Inaugural Committee.

Following Bush's second inauguration in 2005, Stanzel moved to the private sector to work for Microsoft as a senior public relations manager. In this position, he planned media relations activities and served as a spokesman for Microsoft on security issues.

On November 29, 2006, Stanzel returned to the White House as deputy assistant to the president and deputy press secretary. In this role, Stanzel served as a spokesman for Bush on a variety of issues, including homeland security, education, agriculture and energy. Stanzel conducted numerous on camera briefings in the James S. Brady Press Briefing Room and at the "Western White House" in Crawford, Texas. Stanzel regularly prepared Bush for media interviews and developed the strategy for the lengthy series of final interviews the president conducted over the last months of his time in office.

From 2009 to late-2011, he led Stanzel Communications, a firm providing public relations strategy, crisis communications and media training services to corporate clients, government leaders and political candidates.

In the summer and fall of 2010, Stanzel worked as the campaign manager for Defeat 1098. Ballot initiative 1098 would have established a state income tax in Washington State for the first time. Defeat 1098 was successful in stopping the proposed tax, prevailing by nearly 30 points.

Stanzel was employed by Amazon from 2011 to 2017, serving most recently as director of worldwide marketplace public relations. After leaving Amazon in 2017, Stanzel took on a corporate communications role at Capital One and relocated to McLean, Virginia.

== Personal life ==
In 2007, he was elected to the ISU Alumni Association Board of Directors and served as chair in 2012 and 2013. Stanzel also served on the Greenlee School of Journalism and Communication Advisory Council at Iowa State University from 2007 to 2012.

In 2011, Stanzel married Priscilla Jones, a prosecutor in the office of the South Carolina attorney general and former White House staff member. They have three daughters and live in McLean, Virginia.
