= Chautauqua Park Historic District (Sac City, Iowa) =

Historic district in Iowa, United States

- U.S. National Register of Historic Places
- U.S. Historic district
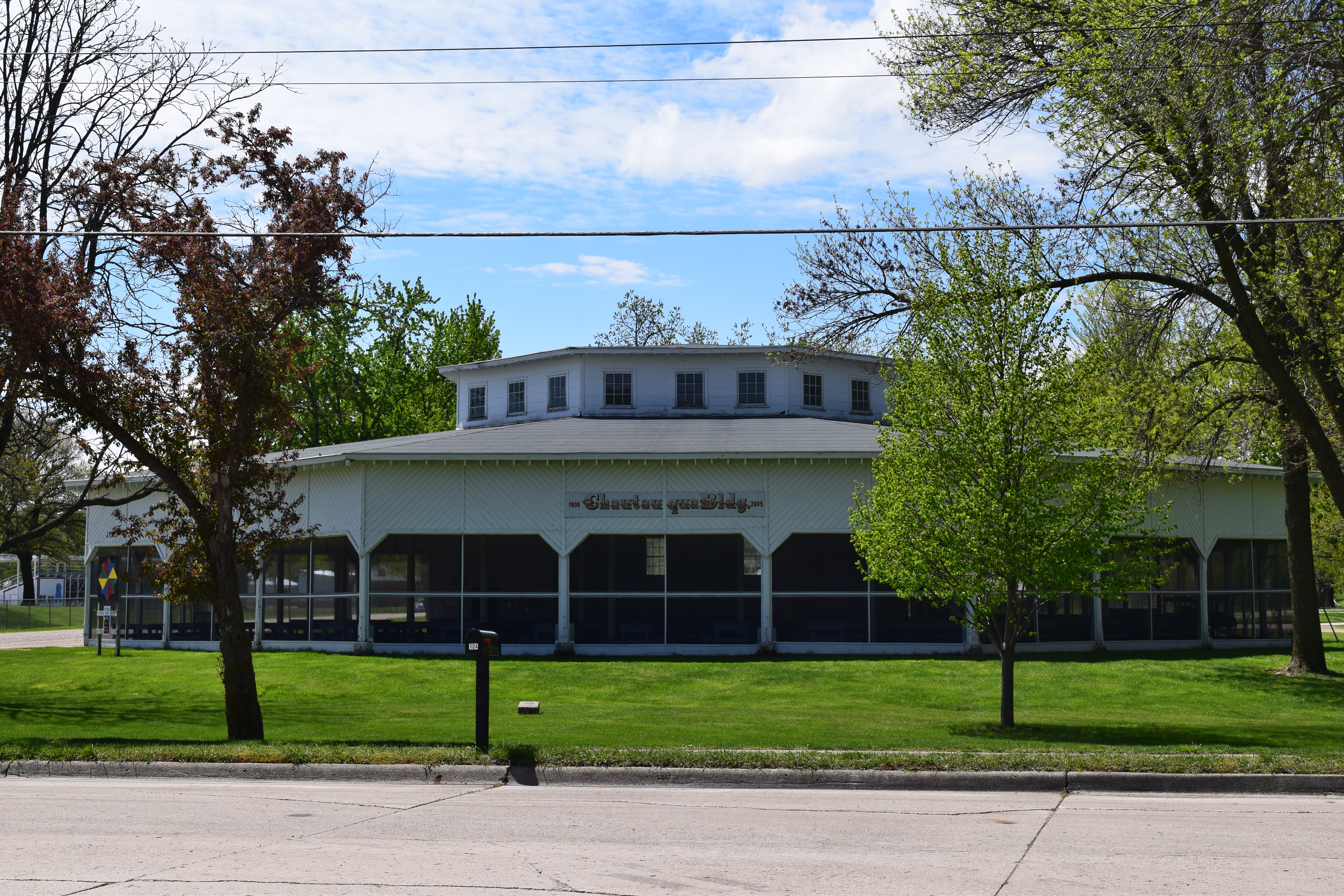

- Location within Iowa Location within the United States
- Location: 106 Park Ave. Sac City, Iowa
- Coordinates: 42°25′13″N 94°59′05″W
- Built by: W.J. Gordon
- Architect: Proudfoot & Bird
- NRHP reference No.: 13001138
- Added to NRHP: February 5, 2014

Chautauqua Park Historic District is a nationally recognized historic district located in Sac City, Iowa, United States. It was listed on the National Register of Historic Places in 2014. The park consists of the Chautauqua Auditorium, Asa Platt gates, Metcalf cabin, a fish house, a small stone bridge, and a shelter house.

== History ==
The Sac City Chautauqua Association was formed in December, 1904 with 120 people buying subscriptions. Chautauqua programs were held at the fairgrounds in 1905, 1906, and 1907. In 1908 they bought the property between the fairgrounds and the North Raccoon River for $1,275. The Des Moines architectural firm of Proudfoot & Bird designed the auditorium and it was built by local contractor W.J. Gordon. It was completed in time for the 1908 Chautauqua. The structure resembles a Chautauqua tent. It features an octagonal front, pillars and open rafters, 33-foot (10 m) ceiling, open sides, and glass windows in the upper tier that provide ventilation when open. It originally had a dirt floor. By 1926 the Chautauqua movement was over here, and the following year the Sac City Park Board assumed the ownership of the park.

The other elements in the park generally date from after the Park Board's ownership of the park. The gates are named for Asa Platt, who built the first house in Sac City and was known for his philanthropy, including the local Chautauquas. They were built sometime before 1931. Changes in streets and the entrance to the park have subsequently by-passed the gates. Built by David Metcalf in 1854, the Metcalf cabin was the first residential building in what would become Sac County. It was moved to the park about the time the city took control of it. The simple frame fish house is a place for anglers to clean their fish. A fish pond was located near the auditorium, and the stone walking bridge crossed it. The bridge was built sometime before 1935, and the pond was removed in the 1970s. The stone shelter house is a picnic shelter that was built by the Works Progress Administration in 1939.
