= Seven Oaks (Sac City, Iowa) =

Historic house in Iowa, United States

- U.S. National Register of Historic Places
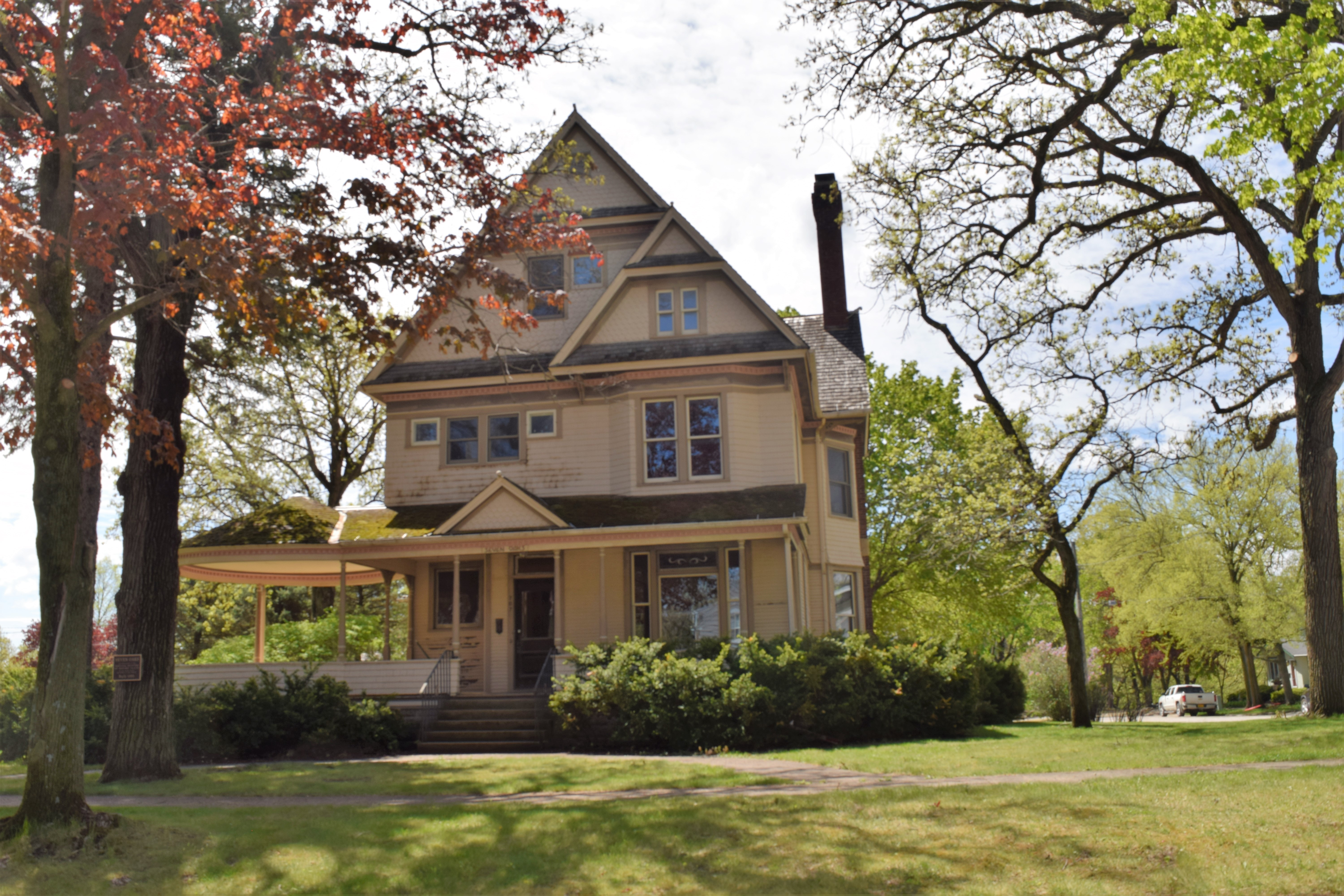

- Location within Iowa Location within the United States
- Location: 707 Audubon St. Sac City, Iowa
- Coordinates: 42°25′16″N 94°59′33″W
- Area: Less than 1 acre
- Built: 1893
- Architect: J.M. Russell; Proudfoot & Bird
- Architectural style: Queen Anne
- NRHP reference No.: 96000236
- Added to NRHP: March 7, 1996

Seven Oaks, also known as the Dixon House, is a historic building located in Sac City, Iowa, United States. The house is locally significant as the finest example of the Queen Anne style. The 2½-story frame structure was designed by Storm Lake, Iowa architect J.M. Russell. The sun porches were designed by the prominent Des Moines architectural firm of Proudfoot & Bird. Weatherboard covers the exterior of the first two floors and the gable ends are composed of wood shingles. It has a fieldstone basement and brick chimneys. It was the first residence in town to have electricity because it had its own generator. The house was built by Eli and Amie Baily for their family home. He was a prominent local banker. It passed to their daughter and son-in-law Paul and Elizabeth Dixon. Paul owned the family lumber company. The house was listed on the National Register of Historic Places in 1996.
