= Blackhawk Lake (Minnesota) =

Lake in the state of Minnesota, United States

- Location within Minnesota
- Location: Dakota County, Minnesota
- Coordinates: 44°49′10″N 93°10′57″W
- Type: Lake
- Surface elevation: 791 feet (241 m)

Blackhawk Lake is a lake in Dakota County, in the U.S. state of Minnesota.

According to Warren Upham, Blackhawk Lake is probably an English translation of the Sioux language name.

== See also ==
- List of lakes in Minnesota
