= Black Hawk Lake (Sac County, Iowa) =

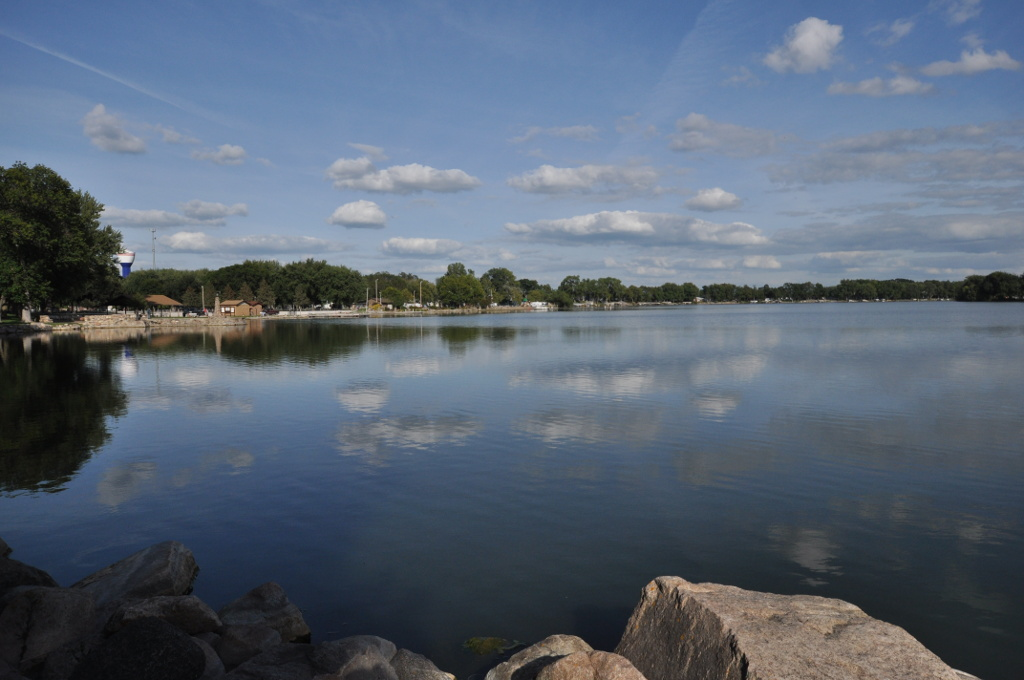
- View of the lake from Lakeside Park in Lake View, Iowa

- Location within Iowa Location within the United States

- United States Environmental Protection Agency map
- Location: Sac County, Iowa
- Coordinates: 42°18′01″N 095°00′22″W
- Type: Glacial lake
- Primary inflows: Ditch No. 60
- Primary outflows: Ditch No. 57, to Indian Creek
- Catchment area: North Raccoon River
- Basin countries: United States
- Surface area: 957 acres (3.87 km^{2})
- Max. depth: 20 ft (6.1 m)
- Surface elevation: 1,220 ft (372 m)
- Settlements: Lake View, Iowa

Black Hawk Lake is a natural glacially-formed lake measuring 957 acres (3.87 km^{2}) in area in Sac County, Iowa, at the eastern edge of the city of Lake View, Iowa in Viola and Wall Lake Townships. It exits through the oddly named "Ditch No. 57" to Indian Creek, a tributary of the North Raccoon River. It is named for Chief Black Hawk.

The state of Iowa maintains a state park and a wildlife management area around the lake. There is a boat ramp and campgrounds and easy access for fishing. The park and lake are the northern end of the Sauk Rail Trail, a trail using an abandoned rail right of way, terminating in the south at Swan Lake. There are plans to establish a hiking and bicycle trail through publicly owned areas surrounding the lake.

== Sources ==
- U.S. Geological Survey Geographic Names Information System: Black Hawk Lake - identifies it as a reservoir
- Black Hawk Lake Park (Iowa DNR)
- Lake statistics and amenities (Iowa DNR)
- Trail development (commercial site)
