= Sac County Courthouse =

- U.S. National Register of Historic Places
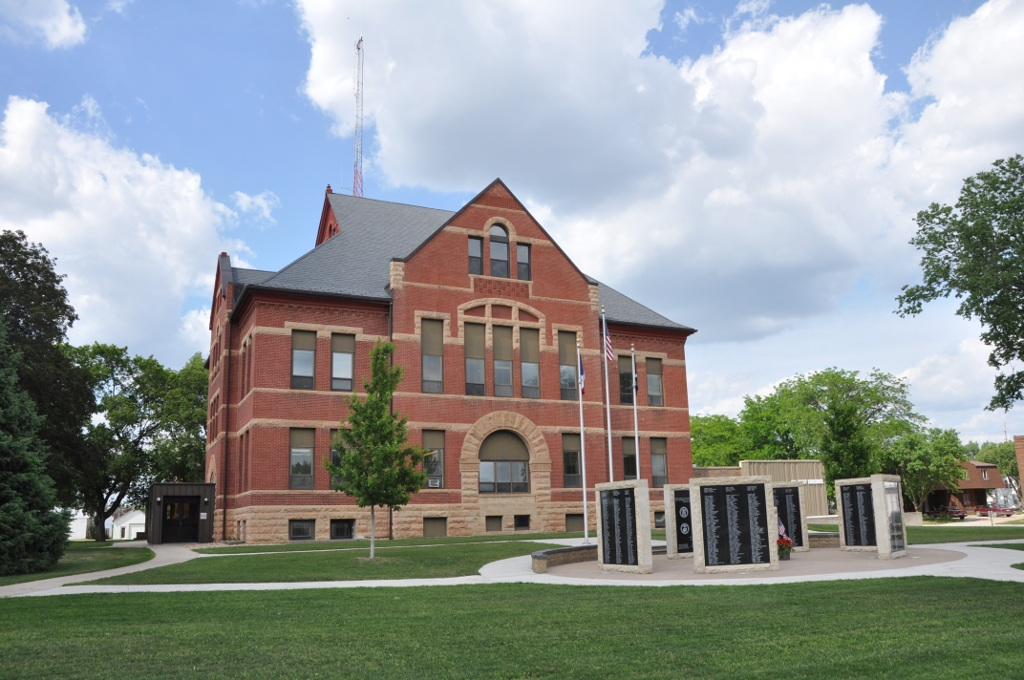

- Location within Iowa Location within the United States
- Interactive map showing the location for Sac County Courthouse
- Location: Main St. Sac City, Iowa
- Coordinates: 42°25′21″N 94°59′17″W
- Area: less than one acre
- Built: 1889
- Architect: J.M. Russell
- Architectural style: Romanesque
- MPS: County Courthouses in Iowa TR
- NRHP reference No.: 81000268
- Added to NRHP: July 2, 1981

The Sac County Courthouse in Sac City, Iowa, United States, was built in 1889. It was listed on the National Register of Historic Places in 1981 as a part of the County Courthouses in Iowa Thematic Resource. The courthouse is the third building the county has used for court functions and county administration.

== History ==
The first Sac County courthouse was a two-story brick building that was constructed in 1860. The building measured 46 by 34 feet (14 by 10 m). The courtroom was on the second floor with the county offices on the first floor. The second courthouse, which was built in 1873, measured 84 by 56 feet (26 by 17 m). It too was built of brick, and was destroyed by an arsonist in 1888.

The present courthouse was built in 1889. Storm Lake, Iowa architect J.M. Russell designed the building that is basically a form of vernacular architecture with a reference to the Romanesque in the entrances arches. It was very similar in design to the courthouse that had just been completed in Storm Lake (no longer extant). The county used $15,000 in insurance money and the same amount raised by county citizens to build the courthouse. The building was renovated in 1900. A courtroom addition was built onto the east side of the building in 1977. The architect for the project was Keninger, Galvin & Associates and the contractor was McCorkle Construction Company.

== Architecture ==
The courthouse is a two-story structure composed of red brick. A center pavilion projects slightly from the main building. It has a stone arch with large voussoirs that used to be the main entrance. Stone trim runs in horizontal bands and around the windows. The gable ends feature shoulder parapets. The base of the building is coarse stone and it is capped with a hipped roof. The significance of the courthouse is derived from its association with county government, and the political power and prestige of Sac City as the county seat.
