= Sac City, Iowa =

- City
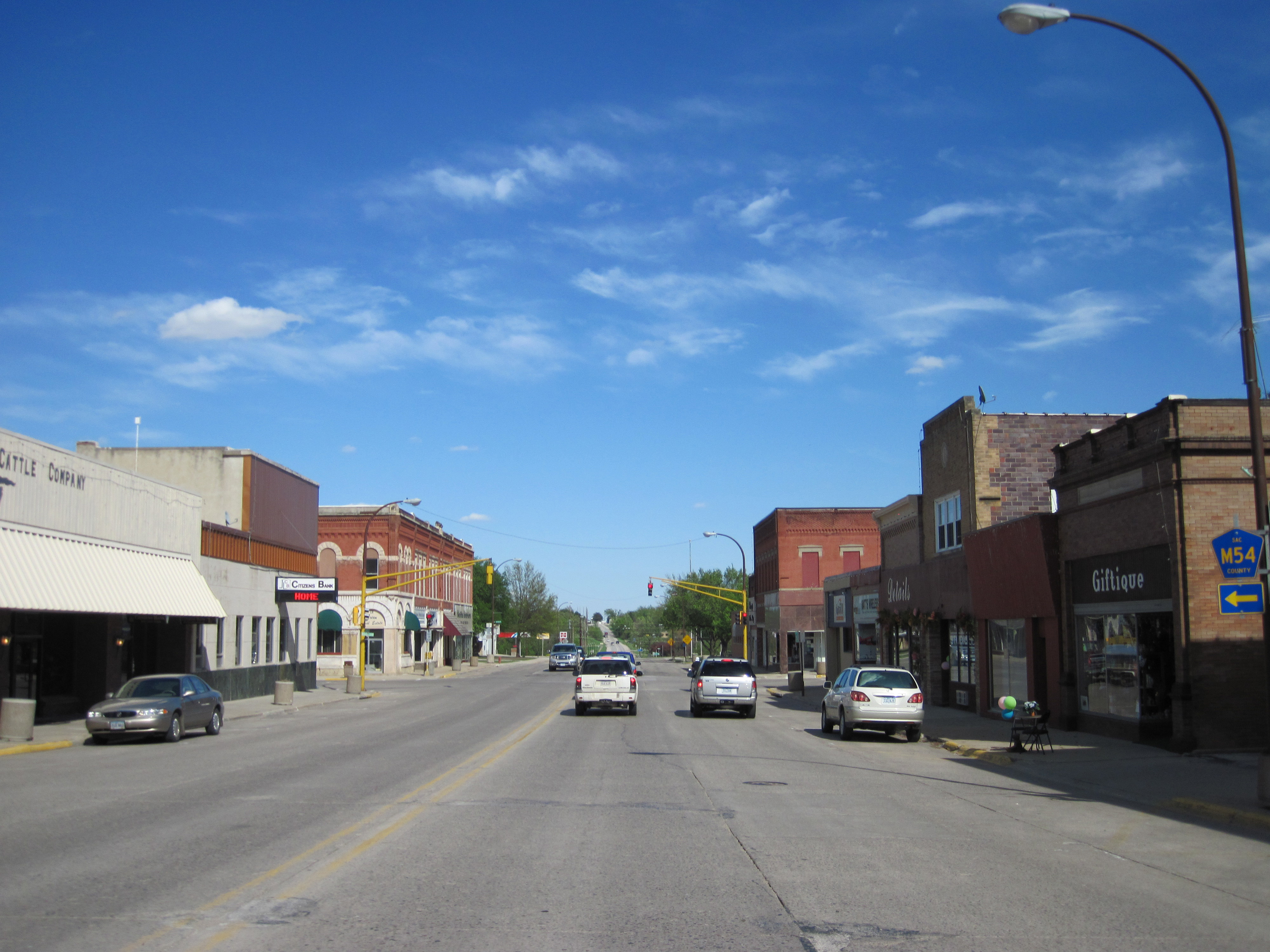
- Downtown Sac City
- Nickname: "Home of Good Indians"
- Motto: "Where Spirit Flows and Opportunity Grows"
- Location of Sac City, Iowa
- Coordinates: 42°25′18″N 95°00′26″W
- Country: United States
- State: Iowa
- County: Sac

Area
  - Total: 4.97 sq mi (12.86 km^{2})
  - Land: 4.90 sq mi (12.68 km^{2})
  - Water: 0.066 sq mi (0.17 km^{2})
- Elevation: 1,260 ft (380 m)

Population (2020)
  - Total: 2,063
  - Density: 421.3/sq mi (162.67/km^{2})
- Time zone: UTC-6 (Central (CST))
  - Summer (DST): UTC-5 (CDT)
- ZIP code: 50583
- Area code: 712
- FIPS code: 19-69645
- GNIS feature ID: 2396466
- Website: saccity.city

Sac City is a city in and the county seat of Sac County, Iowa, United States, just southwest of the eastern intersection of U.S. Routes 20 and 71 in the rolling hills along the valley of the Raccoon River. The city is one of 45 designated Main Street Iowa communities in the Main Street Iowa development program. The population was 2,063 in the 2020 census, a decline from 2,368 in 2000.

== History ==
Sac City was first platted in 1855 by Joshua Keith Powell of Fort Dodge, Iowa. The town was so named because the Sac and Meskwaki peoples (Note: Sometimes known as the Sauk and Fox—the French name "Sac" and the English equivalent "Sauk" are both correct and interchangeable. Both derive from "Asakiwaki", meaning "yellow earth people".) were in possession of the land at the time of the Louisiana Purchase. The City of Sac City was incorporated 19 years later, in 1874.

Judge Eugene Criss, credited as the father of Sac City, left Wisconsin and crossed the Mississippi River in early 1855 by covered wagon. He was in search of waterpower and wanted to establish a settlement in new, untried country. Deciding upon the North Raccoon River for his settlement, Criss erected the first log cabin in Sac City, established himself in the hotel business, and kept a stage station and general store for nearby settlers.

As early as 1859, there was talk of building a railroad through Sac County, but the first one did not come to Sac City till 1879. Railroad companies refused to lay tracks through undeveloped or semi-developed areas, and Sac City did not meet the requirements. The companies demanded that communities be advanced enough to provide a quick return to capital before they would construct a steam and iron highway through the area. When it came, the railroad greatly benefited Sac City. The Chicago and North Western Transportation Company connected Sac City, Wall Lake, Auburn, Odebolt, Lake View, Early, and Schaller, as well as the cities where crops were sold.

The first Sac County Fair was held in 1871 on 10 acres (40,000 m^{2}) of ground east of Sac City that the Sac County Agricultural Society had bought that year. The fair was one of the year's biggest events and brought people from miles around to see the harness races, livestock exhibits, produce, needlework, and art goods.

The Sac City Chautauqua Association was organized in December 1904 with 120 members. The Association brought many fine programs to the community, and because transportation was still slow and laborious, many families stayed in tents on the grounds for the entire session, about eight or nine days. At first the meetings were held in a tent, but by 1908, the citizens of Sac City built a Chautauqua Building in which to hold their meetings, and which is now the only one of its kind in Iowa.

=== Modern-day ===
In 2017, lifelong Sac City resident and businessman John Criss donated $5.7 million of his estate to the city for beautification projects.

== Geography ==
According to the United States Census Bureau, the city has an area of 4.93 square miles (12.77 km^{2}), of which 4.86 square miles (12.59 km^{2}) is land and 0.07 square miles (0.18 km^{2}) is water.

=== Climate ===
Humid continental climate is a climatic region typified by large seasonal temperature differences, with warm to hot (and often humid) summers and cold (sometimes severely cold) winters. Precipitation is relatively well distributed year-round in many areas with this climate. The Köppen Climate Classification subtype for this climate is "Dfa" (Hot Summer Continental Climate).

Climate data for Sac City, Iowa, 1991–2020 normals, extremes 1893–present
Month	Jan	Feb	Mar	Apr	May	Jun	Jul	Aug	Sep	Oct	Nov	Dec	Year
Record high °F (°C)	68 (20)	70 (21)	88 (31)	96 (36)	108 (42)	107 (42)	113 (45)	114 (46)	103 (39)	95 (35)	80 (27)	69 (21)	114 (46)
Mean maximum °F (°C)	47.6 (8.7)	53.5 (11.9)	70.7 (21.5)	82.2 (27.9)	88.7 (31.5)	92.0 (33.3)	93.0 (33.9)	91.5 (33.1)	89.3 (31.8)	83.8 (28.8)	67.9 (19.9)	52.9 (11.6)	94.4 (34.7)
Mean daily maximum °F (°C)	26.4 (−3.1)	31.1 (−0.5)	44.4 (6.9)	58.9 (14.9)	70.1 (21.2)	80.1 (26.7)	83.2 (28.4)	80.9 (27.2)	75.2 (24.0)	61.8 (16.6)	45.1 (7.3)	31.7 (−0.2)	57.4 (14.1)
Daily mean °F (°C)	17.1 (−8.3)	21.5 (−5.8)	34.0 (1.1)	46.7 (8.2)	58.5 (14.7)	69.0 (20.6)	72.5 (22.5)	69.9 (21.1)	62.4 (16.9)	49.5 (9.7)	34.7 (1.5)	22.9 (−5.1)	46.6 (8.1)
Mean daily minimum °F (°C)	7.8 (−13.4)	11.8 (−11.2)	23.5 (−4.7)	34.5 (1.4)	46.9 (8.3)	57.8 (14.3)	61.7 (16.5)	58.9 (14.9)	49.7 (9.8)	37.2 (2.9)	24.4 (−4.2)	14.0 (−10.0)	35.7 (2.1)
Mean minimum °F (°C)	−14.0 (−25.6)	−8.9 (−22.7)	2.8 (−16.2)	21.2 (−6.0)	33.6 (0.9)	45.7 (7.6)	51.6 (10.9)	49.9 (9.9)	35.3 (1.8)	21.9 (−5.6)	8.1 (−13.3)	−7.1 (−21.7)	−17.4 (−27.4)
Record low °F (°C)	−35 (−37)	−30 (−34)	−19 (−28)	4 (−16)	23 (−5)	32 (0)	42 (6)	35 (2)	21 (−6)	−2 (−19)	−11 (−24)	−28 (−33)	−35 (−37)
Average precipitation inches (mm)	0.73 (19)	0.96 (24)	1.82 (46)	3.48 (88)	4.59 (117)	5.14 (131)	3.89 (99)	4.43 (113)	2.89 (73)	2.42 (61)	1.57 (40)	1.17 (30)	33.09 (841)
Average snowfall inches (cm)	7.0 (18)	7.4 (19)	4.2 (11)	1.9 (4.8)	0.0 (0.0)	0.0 (0.0)	0.0 (0.0)	0.0 (0.0)	0.0 (0.0)	0.5 (1.3)	2.7 (6.9)	7.2 (18)	30.9 (79)
Average precipitation days (≥ 0.01 in)	4.9	5.4	7.4	9.9	12.6	11.3	8.9	9.3	8.5	8.3	5.2	5.5	97.2
Average snowy days (≥ 0.1 in)	3.6	3.6	2.0	0.9	0.0	0.0	0.0	0.0	0.0	0.3	1.2	3.8	15.4
Source 1: NOAA
Source 2: National Weather Service

== Demographics ==
Historical population
Census	Pop.	Note	%±
1870	156		—
1880	595		281.4%
1890	1,249		109.9%
1900	2,079		66.5%
1910	2,201		5.9%
1920	2,630		19.5%
1930	2,854		8.5%
1940	3,165		10.9%
1950	3,170		0.2%
1960	3,354		5.8%
1970	3,268		−2.6%
1980	3,000		−8.2%
1990	2,492		−16.9%
2000	2,368		−5.0%
2010	2,220		−6.2%
2020	2,063		−7.1%
U.S. Decennial Census

=== 2020 census ===
As of the 2020 census, there were 2,063 people, 953 households, and 524 families residing in the city. The population density was 421.3 inhabitants per square mile (162.7/km^{2}). There were 1,130 housing units at an average density of 230.8 per square mile (89.1/km^{2}).

The median age in the city was 46.6 years. 20.0% of residents were under the age of 18, 5.7% were between the ages of 20 and 24, 21.8% were from 25 to 44, 24.7% were from 45 to 64, and 26.2% were 65 years of age or older. The gender makeup of the city was 47.1% male and 52.9% female. For every 100 females there were 88.9 males, and for every 100 females age 18 and over there were 85.7 males age 18 and over.

There were 953 households, of which 21.6% had children under the age of 18 living in them. Of all households, 42.0% were married-couple households, 7.5% were cohabitating-couple households, 19.2% were households with a male householder and no spouse or partner present, and 31.4% were households with a female householder and no spouse or partner present. About 45.0% of all households were non-families, 38.7% of all households were made up of individuals, and 21.2% had someone living alone who was 65 years of age or older.

0.0% of residents lived in urban areas, while 100.0% lived in rural areas.

There were 1,130 housing units, of which 15.7% were vacant. The homeowner vacancy rate was 5.2% and the rental vacancy rate was 13.1%.

Racial composition as of the 2020 census
Race	Number	Percent
White	1,968	95.4%
Black or African American	10	0.5%
American Indian and Alaska Native	1	0.0%
Asian	2	0.1%
Native Hawaiian and Other Pacific Islander	1	0.0%
Some other race	22	1.1%
Two or more races	59	2.9%
Hispanic or Latino (of any race)	57	2.8%

=== 2010 census ===
As of the 2010 census, there were 2,220 people, 1,018 households, and 590 families residing in the city. The population density was 456.8 inhabitants per square mile (176.4/km^{2}). There were 1,165 housing units at an average density of 239.7 per square mile (92.5/km^{2}). The racial makeup of the city was 98.3% White, 0.1% African American, 0.2% Asian, and 1.3% from two or more races. Hispanic or Latino of any race were 0.2% of the population.

There were 1,018 households, of which 22.7% had children under the age of 18 living with them, 45.9% were married couples living together, 7.5% had a female householder with no husband present, 4.6% had a male householder with no wife present, and 42.0% were non-families. 38.3% of all households were made up of individuals, and 20.1% had someone living alone who was 65 years of age or older. The average household size was 2.10 and the average family size was 2.75.

The median age in the city was 48.8 years. 20.8% of residents were under the age of 18; 5.9% were between the ages of 18 and 24; 18% were from 25 to 44; 28.8% were from 45 to 64; and 26.4% were 65 years of age or older. The gender makeup of the city was 46.2% male and 53.8% female.

=== 2000 census ===
As of the 2000 census, there were 2,368 people, 1,082 households, and 642 families residing in the city. The population density was 483.0 inhabitants per square mile (186.5/km^{2}). There were 1,209 housing units at an average density of 246.6 per square mile (95.2/km^{2}). The racial makeup of the city was 98.61% White, 0.34% African American, 0.04% Native American, 0.08% Asian, 0.34% from other races, and 0.59% from two or more races. Hispanic or Latino of any race were 0.93% of the population.

There were 1,082 households, of which 21.7% had children under the age of 18 living with them, 48.4% were married couples living together, 7.9% had a female householder with no husband present, and 40.6% were non-families. 37.8% of all households were made up of individuals, and 23.1% had someone living alone who was 65 years of age or older. The average household size was 2.09 and the average family size was 2.70.

19.1% are under the age of 18, 6.9% from 18 to 24, 21.6% from 25 to 44, 23.3% from 45 to 64, and 29.1% who were 65 years of age or older. The median age was 46 years. For every 100 females, there were 84.1 males. For every 100 females age 18 and over, there were 79.3 males.

The median income for a household in the city was $30,300, and the median income for a family was $39,139. Males had a median income of $25,409 versus $19,137 for females. The per capita income for the city was $17,229. About 7.9% of families and 13.6% of the population were below the poverty line, including 23.4% of those under age 18 and 10.8% of those age 65 or over.

== Arts and culture ==
=== Library ===
The Sac City Public Library contains over 20,000 volumes, magazines, films, educational, videos, and computers available to the public.

=== Landmarks ===
- Sac County Courthouse - Listed on the National Register of Historic Places
- Sac City Monument Square Historic District - Features a monument to the soldiers of the Union Army
- World's largest popcorn ball - adjacent to the Sac City Museum

=== Pop culture ===
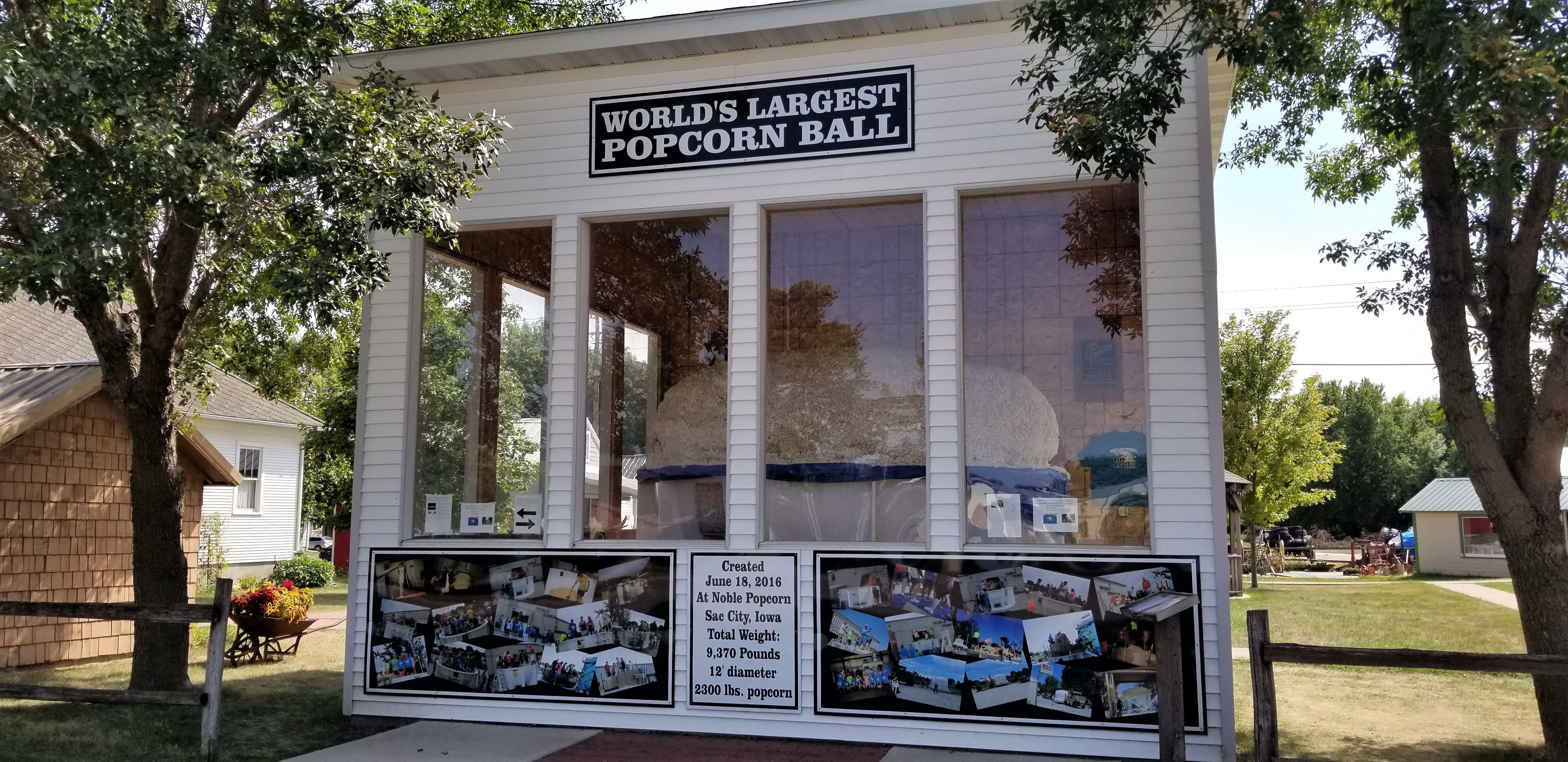
World's Largest Popcorn Ball (built in 2016) in 2020

Popcorn ball

Sac City was home to a previous world's largest popcorn ball, which weighed 3,100 pounds and was housed in its own building. A new popcorn ball was created in 2009, weighing 5,060 pounds. On June 18, 2016, volunteers assembled another possible record-breaking ball weighing 9,370 pounds and displayed in a new pavilion as a roadside attraction.

== Infrastructure ==
=== Transportation ===
Airport

The Sac City Municipal Airport (ICAO: KSKI) is about 2.5 miles (4.0 km) south of the central business district. Access to the airport is provided by U.S. Route 20, U.S. Route 71 and County Roads D42 and M54. The Airport is located on 136 acres (0.55 km^{2}) owned by the City of Sac City. The established elevation is 1,250 feet (380 m) above sea level (MSL).

The Sac City Municipal Airport is a Class III Airport with a concrete main runway (18/36) 4,100 feet and 75 ft (23 m) wide with a crosswind runway of 44 ft (13 m) by 2,667 ft (813 m). The secondary runway (14/32) surface is blacktop.

=== Health care ===
Loring Hospital in Sac City is a 25-bed Critical Access Hospital serving Sac County and neighboring counties. It opened in 1950. The hospital began a $10 million construction and renovation project to address changing health care needs and prepare for future growth.

== Education ==
The city is served by the East Sac County Community School District. It was a part of the Sac Community School District until 2011, when it merged into East Sac County.

== Notable people ==
- Earl Dew, jockey
- George B. Perkins, businessman and Iowa politician
- Doug Shull, former Iowa State legislator
- Scott Stanzel, former White House Deputy Press Secretary
- Samuel A. Stouffer, social scientist
- Eric Swalwell, former member of the United States House of Representatives from California
- Paul Zahniser, baseball player

== See also ==
- U.S. Route 20 in Iowa
- U.S. Route 71 in Iowa
