= Black Hawk State Park =

State park in Sac County, Iowa

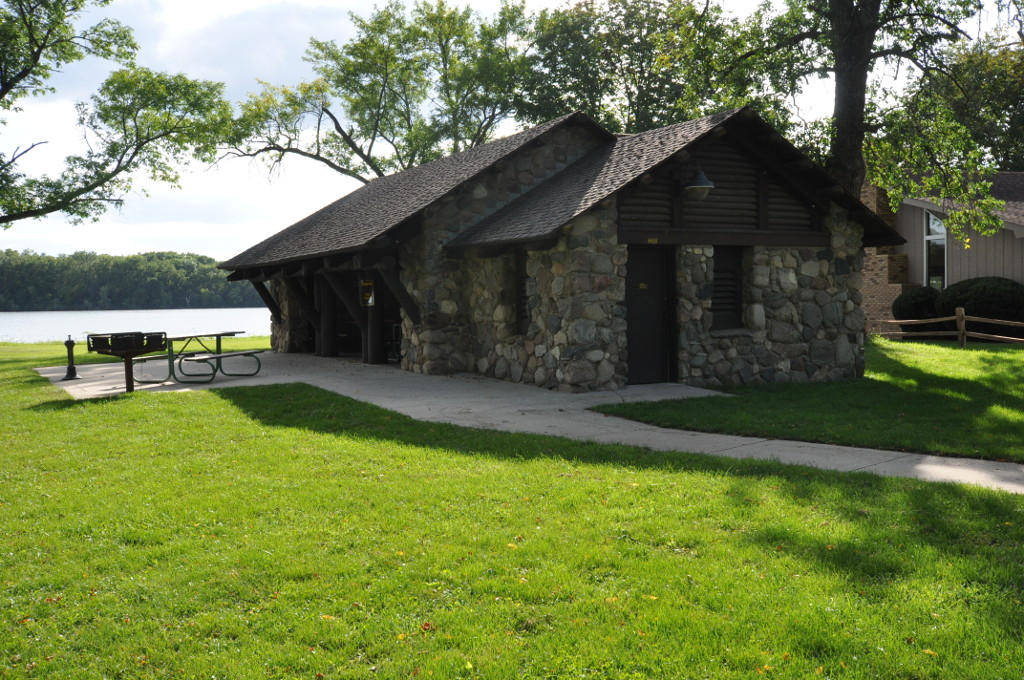

- Location within Iowa Location within the United States
- Location: Sac County, Iowa, United States
- Coordinates: 42°17′54″N 95°01′32″W
- Area: 86 acres (35 ha)
- Elevation: 1,221 ft (372 m)
- Established: 1935
- Administrator: Iowa Department of Natural Resources
- Named for: Chief Black Hawk
- Website: Official website
- Blackhawk State Park; Wildlife Preserve Area (Area A); Black Hawk Preserve (Area B); Denison Beach Area (Area C)
- U.S. National Register of Historic Places
- U.S. Historic district
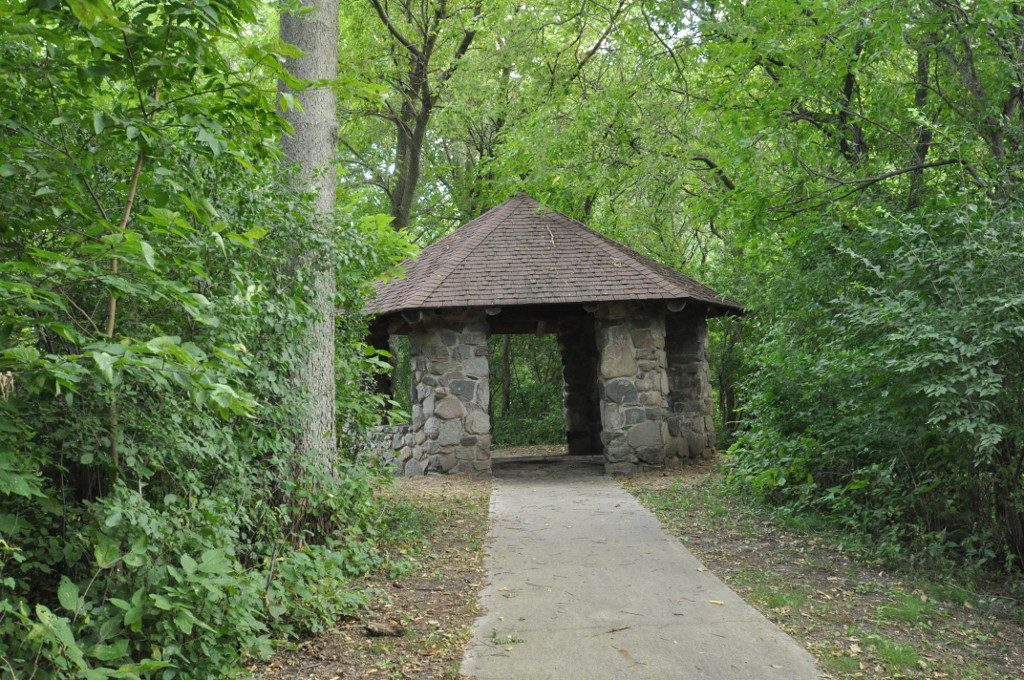
- The "Witches Tower"
- Built: 1933-1935
- Built by: Civilian Conservation Corps
- Architectural style: Rustic
- MPS: CCC Properties in Iowa State Parks MPS
- NRHP reference No.: 90001678; 90001679; 90001680<
- Added to NRHP: November 15, 1990

Black Hawk State Park is a public recreation area in the town of Lake View, Sac County, Iowa, United States. The state park includes campgrounds, trails, game preserves, historic structures, and the waters of Black Hawk Lake. It is also home to the annual Lake View Water Carnival held in July. Three sections of the park were listed on the National Register of Historic Places in 1991.

== History ==
The state of Iowa acquired the property for the park in several parcels through the efforts of Dr. E. E. Speaker of Lake View, who also served on the State Board of Conservation. The parcels included a former gravel quarry, a 30-acre (12 ha) farm on the southeast side of the lake, and the 30-acre (12 ha) Denison Beach. Civilian Conservation Corps (CCC) Company VCCC 1776, a veterans unit, constructed the parks amenities. They arrived in November 1933 and left the park on May 16, 1935. Another CCC company trained here in June 1934. Several Works Progress Administration transient companies worked in the park in 1936 and 1937. VCCC 1776 began working in the Wildlife Preserve Area (Area A) first. They cleaned up the former quarry, created 13 fish rearing ponds, and planted over 3,400 trees by 1935. They completed the picnic shelter, two stone and peeled log latrines, and added camp stoves and barbecue ovens in the Black Hawk Preserve (Area B) between January and April 1935. The large picnic shelter in the Denison Beach Area (Area C) was completed between March and May 1935. The park was opened for visitors by 1936.

=== National Register of Historic Places ===
On November 15, 1990, three areas of the park were listed on the National Register of Historic Places. Their historic importance is derived from their association with the CCC. The park was part of a larger study of Iowa's state parks called Civilian Conservation Corps Properties in Iowa State Parks: 1933-1942. Area A focuses on the wildlife preserve that includes the fish rearing ponds, a latrine, and infrastructure such as steps, a bench, and a paved road. Area B includes a picnic shelter, latrine, drinking fountain and incinerator. Area C is a picnic shelter and latrine building. The Rustic style was used in the design of the buildings. The significance of this architectural style is that it was designed to blend into its natural surroundings by means of its material, design, and workmanship. Areas A and B are historic districts, while Area C is an individual listing.
