= Tornado outbreak of April 30 – May 2, 1967 =

Weather event in the United States

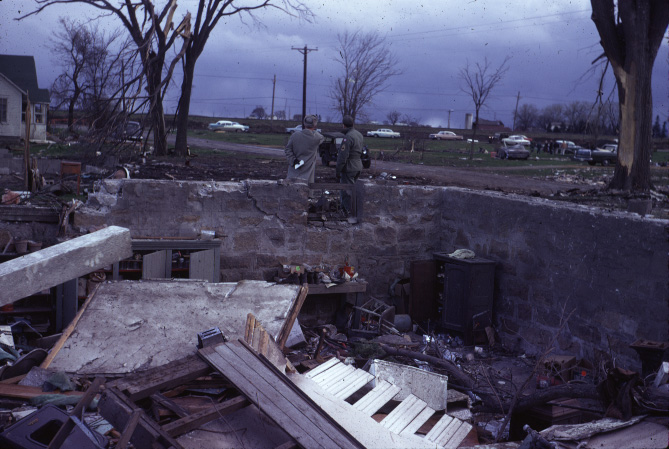
- A home leveled to its foundation in Waseca, Minnesota

Meteorological history
- Duration: April 30–May 2, 1967

Tornado outbreak
- Tornadoes: 38 confirmed
- Max. rating: F4 tornado
- Duration: 2 days, 2 hours, and 55 minutes
- Largest hail: 2 3/4 in (7.0 cm) in diameter in Pittsburgh County, Oklahoma, on April 30 70 kn (81 mph; 130 km/h) in Louisiana on May 1

Overall effects
- Casualties: 13 fatalities, 90 injuries
- Damage: $286.982 million (1967 USD) (Note: All losses are in 1967 USD unless otherwise noted.) $2.77 billion (2025 USD)
- Areas affected: Midwestern and Southern United States (particularly Iowa and Minnesota)
- Part of the tornado outbreaks of 1967

A destructive severe weather episode affected portions of the Midwestern and Southern United States from April 30–May 2, 1967. It consisted of two consecutive tornado outbreaks that generated at least 38 tornadoes, causing 13 fatalities and 90 injuries. All of the deaths occurred on April 30, which is known as the 1967 Iowa–Minnesota tornado outbreak, or Black Sunday, to residents of Iowa and southern Minnesota. That day spawned a total of 21 tornadoes, devastating the towns of Albert Lea and Waseca, Minnesota. (Note: An outbreak is generally defined as a group of at least six tornadoes (the number sometimes varies slightly according to local climatology) with no more than a six-hour gap between individual tornadoes. An outbreak sequence, prior to (after) the start of modern records in 1950, is defined as a period of no more than two (one) consecutive days without at least one significant (F2 or stronger) tornado.) (Note: The Fujita scale was devised under the aegis of scientist T. Theodore Fujita in the early 1970s. Prior to the advent of the scale in 1971, tornadoes in the United States were officially unrated. While the Fujita scale has been superseded by the Enhanced Fujita scale in the U.S. since February 1, 2007, Canada utilized the old scale until April 1, 2013; nations elsewhere, like the United Kingdom, apply other classifications such as the TORRO scale.)

== Background ==
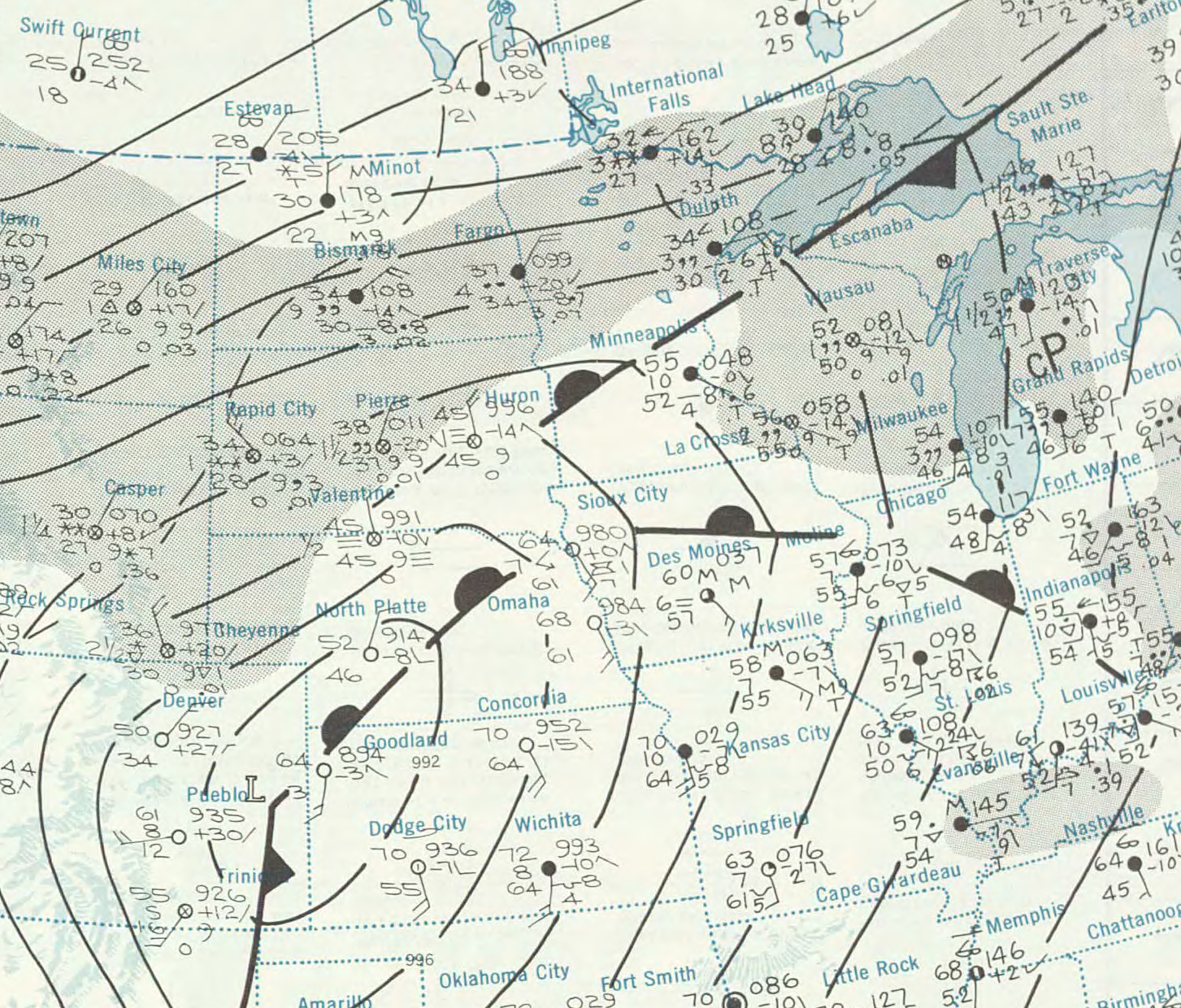
Surface weather analysis for April 30, 1967, at 1:00 a.m. EST (06:00 UTC), the morning prior to the tornado outbreak.

Beginning on April 30, 1967, a potent mid-latitude cyclone generated severe weather, including blizzards and severe thunderstorms, across a broad region extending from the northernmost High Plains and Rocky Mountains to the Mississippi and Ohio River valleys. These conditions occurred within a seventy-two-hour-long span. By 1:00 p.m. CDT (12:00 p.m. CST; 18:00 UTC) on April 30, a low-pressure area of at most 984 millibars (29.06 inHg) was centered near Pierre, South Dakota, with a stationary front superimposed from north of Sioux Falls to near LaCrosse, Wisconsin. Nearby, a warm front also attended from south of Sioux Falls to near Des Moines, Iowa, and St. Louis, Missouri. As the warm sector advanced into northernmost Iowa and southern Minnesota, surface air temperatures rose into the 60s and low 70s °F, while dew points reached the 60s °F. Winds at the surface ranged from 15 to 25 miles per hour (24 to 40 km/h) out of the east-southeast. By 7:00 p.m. CDT (6:00 p.m. CST; 00:00 UTC), the warm front migrated to near the Minnesota-Iowa border, while the mid-level trough associated with the surface cyclone acquired a negative tilt. At the same time, a strong jet stream brought deep-layer wind shear over portions of northern Iowa and southern Minnesota—indicating favorable conditions for tornadogenesis.

== Daily statistics ==
Confirmed tornadoes by Fujita rating
FU	F0	F1	F2	F3	F4	F5	Total
0	1	8	21	4	4	0	38
"FU" denotes unclassified but confirmed tornadoes.

Daily statistics of tornadoes produced by the tornado outbreak sequence of April 30–May 2, 1967
Date	Total	Fujita scale rating							Deaths	Injuries	Damage	Ref.
Date	Total	FU	F0	F1	F2	F3	F4	F5	Deaths	Injuries	Damage	Ref.
April 30	21	0	0	4	10	3	4	0	13	81	≥$11,000,000	
May 1	15	0	1	5	8	1	0	0	0	9	≥$25,000	
May 2	2	0	0	0	2	0	0	0	0	0	$25,000	
Total	38	0	1	8	21	4	4	0	13	90	$286,962,000	

Outbreak death toll
State	Total	County	County total
Minnesota	13	Freeborn	7
Minnesota	13	Waseca	6
Totals	13		
All deaths were tornado-related

== Confirmed tornadoes ==
=== April 30 event ===
Confirmed tornadoes – Sunday, April 30, 1967 (Note: All dates are based on the local time zone where the tornado touched down; however, all times are in Coordinated Universal Time and dates are split at midnight CST/CDT for consistency.) (Note: Prior to 1994, only the average widths of tornado paths were officially listed.)
F#	Location	County / Parish	State	Start coord.	Time (UTC)	Path length	Max. width	Summary
F1	NW of De Smet	Kingsbury	SD	44.40°N 97.57°W	21:15–?	0.1 miles (0.16 km)	10 yards (9.1 m)	A brief tornado struck unpopulated countryside, resulting in no material damage.
F2	NW of Vincent to ENE of Thor	Webster	IA	42.60°N 94.03°W	21:50–?	6.8 miles (10.9 km)	200 yards (180 m)	Tornado researcher Thomas P. Grazulis did not list this tornado as an F2 or stronger.
F2	ESE of Gruver to SE of Huntington	Emmet	IA	43.38°N 94.68°W	22:00–?	8.2 miles (13.2 km)	300 yards (270 m)	This tornado struck six barns, one of which was destroyed. Damage was also reported in Dolliver.
F2	Emmetsburg to WNW of Ringsted	Palo Alto, Emmet	IA	43.12°N 94.67°W	22:10–?	14 miles (23 km)	300 yards (270 m)	This tornado struck the western portion of the community of Halfa, tearing the roofs off several homes. While passing east of Gridley, it also destroyed barns.
F2	WSW of Crystal Lake	Hancock, Winnebago	IA	43.22°N 93.80°W	22:30–?	4.3 miles (6.9 km)	300 yards (270 m)	This tornado struck eight farmsteads, three of which were nearly destroyed, except for the farmhouses.
F2	NNE of Gruver	Emmet	IA	43.42°N 94.68°W	22:33–?	1 mile (1.6 km)	200 yards (180 m)	Grazulis did not list this tornado as an F2 or stronger.
F3	Clear Lake	Cerro Gordo	IA	43.10°N 93.42°W	23:05–?	7.7 miles (12.4 km)	250 yards (230 m)	This tornado destroyed barns, agricultural machinery, and one home. Observers reported three distinct funnel clouds. Grazulis listed the tornado as an F2.
F2	Fort Madison	Lee	IA	40.63°N 91.32°W	23:20–?	2.3 miles (3.7 km)	400 yards (370 m)	Grazulis did not list this tornado as an F2 or stronger.
F4	ENE of Manly to SSE of Otranto	Worth	IA	43.30°N 93.17°W	23:28–?	13.3 miles (21.4 km)	400 yards (370 m)	This violent tornado caused extensive damage to approximately ten farms.
F3	SSE of Kensett, IA to N of London, MN	Worth (IA), Freeborn (MN)	IA, MN	43.33°N 93.20°W	23:30–?	17.2 miles (27.7 km)	800 yards (730 m)	This tornado caused extensive damage to six farmsteads and destroyed a few homes.
F2	W of Lemond to NE of Waseca	Waseca	MN	43.98°N 93.42°W	00:00–?	9.2 miles (14.8 km)	67 yards (61 m)	This tornado destroyed barns as it passed near Lemond and west of Meriden. The total path length may have been 30 miles (48 km).
F1	WSW of Union	Steele	MN	43.87°N 93.20°W	00:05–?	0.2 miles (0.32 km)	10 yards (9.1 m)	Unknown
F3	Alden to ESE of Matawan	Freeborn, Waseca	MN	43.67°N 93.58°W	00:05–?	14 miles (23 km)	100 yards (91 m)	2 deaths – Near the start of its path, this tornado neared the threshold of F4-level intensity, based on structural damage to farms. Additionally, the tornado destroyed barns. Twenty-three people sustained injuries.
F4	ENE of Northwood, IA to ENE of Myrtle, MN	Worth (IA), Freeborn (MN)	IA, MN	43.45°N 93.17°W	00:20–?	7.6 miles (12.2 km)	500 yards (460 m)	This powerful tornado destroyed ten farms in Minnesota, three of which sustained borderline-F5-level damage. One injury was reported.
F4	NNW of Twin Lakes to Albert Lea to Owatonna	Freeborn, Steele	MN	43.57°N 93.43°W	00:23–?	38.7 miles (62.3 km)	100 yards (91 m)	5 deaths – This destructive, long-tracked tornado caused $2 million in damages in Albert Lea alone. The tornado ravaged the western portion of the town; there, it significantly damaged 55 homes, and "completely leveled" 10 others. In all, the tornado destroyed 26 homes and severely damaged an additional 64 in Albert Lea. Along its entire path, the tornado flattened farms at six different locations. The tornado also destroyed many structures on farms near Owatonna. The tornado injured a total of 35 people.
F4	W of Hartland to NNE of Waseca	Freeborn, Waseca	MN	43.80°N 93.52°W	00:52–?	20.1 miles (32.3 km)	267 yards (244 m)	6 deaths – This tornado was the last violent event of the entire outbreak sequence. It paralleled Minnesota State Highway 13, known then as Highway 67, and damaged farms on each side of the highway. In Waseca, the tornado leveled six homes, destroyed 16, and extensively damaged 25. The tornado injured 22 people.
F1	NW of Littleton	Buchanan	IA	42.55°N 92.05°W	01:00–?	0.1 miles (0.16 km)	50 yards (46 m)	Unknown
F1	NW of Montezuma	Poweshiek	IA	41.60°N 92.55°W	01:00–?	0.1 miles (0.16 km)	10 yards (9.1 m)	Unknown
F2	SE of Austin to E of Nicolville	Mower	MN	43.63°N 92.93°W	01:15–?	3.8 miles (6.1 km)	10 yards (9.1 m)	This short-lived tornado destroyed a few barns and unroofed a home on a farmstead.
F2	S of Marion to N of Eyota	Olmsted	MN	43.93°N 92.35°W	02:10–02:15	6.8 miles (10.9 km)	10 yards (9.1 m)	This tornado destroyed a barn and a trailer.
F2	SSE of Epworth	Dubuque	IA	42.40°N 90.90°W	03:00–?	2 miles (3.2 km)	400 yards (370 m)	Grazulis did not list this tornado as an F2 or stronger.

=== May 1 event ===
Confirmed tornadoes – Monday, May 1, 1967
F#	Location	County / Parish	State	Start Coord.	Time (UTC)	Path length	Max. width	Summary
F2	E of North Zulch	Madison	TX	30.92°N 96.08°W	12:00–?	0.6 miles (0.97 km)	33 yards (30 m)	A brief tornado destroyed a barn and a livestock pen. Fencing was wrenched from the ground as well. Grazulis did not list this tornado as an F2 or stronger.
F1	NNW of Lambert	Hot Spring	AR	34.35°N 93.23°W	13:20–?	0.1 miles (0.16 km)	10 yards (9.1 m)	A brief tornado felled many trees and damaged one home.
F2	WSW of Ebenezer	Camp	TX	32.95°N 94.92°W	13:30–?	1 mile (1.6 km)	50 yards (46 m)	A brief tornado destroyed a pair of chicken coops and damaged a number of large livestock feeders. Trees were downed as well. Grazulis did not list this tornado as an F2 or stronger.
F1	Mount Pleasant	Wood	TX	33.17°N 94.97°W	16:00–?	0.1 miles (0.16 km)	10 yards (9.1 m)	A brief tornado damaged several buildings and a farmhouse on up to six farmsteads. Trees were uprooted as well.
F2	NNE of Corsicana	Navarro	TX	32.17°N 96.45°W	16:00–?	2 miles (3.2 km)	33 yards (30 m)	A brief tornado, coincident and possibly in conjunction with downbursts, flipped a mobile home and damaged or destroyed a few houses and several barns. A large pecan was prostrated as well. Grazulis did not list this tornado as an F2 or stronger.
F0	SSE of Avinger	Cass	TX	32.88°N 94.55°W	17:00–?	0.5 miles (0.80 km)	300 yards (270 m)	A brief tornado sheared and uprooted trees beside a church.
F1	W of Negreet	Sabine	LA	31.47°N 93.60°W	18:50–?	1 mile (1.6 km)	33 yards (30 m)	A tornado was observed but did not produce damage.
F2	E of Symonds	Bolivar	MS	33.83°N 90.85°W	19:45–?	1 mile (1.6 km)	200 yards (180 m)	A brief tornado affected a 600-acre (240 ha) conservation area as it tossed and sank forty motorboats, some of which were wrapped around trees. Additionally, the tornado tore a section from a 200-foot-long (61 m) pier, severely damaged several trees, and tilted a concession stand. Grazulis did not list this tornado as an F2 or stronger.
F2	Onalaska to W of Leggett	Polk	TX	30.80°N 95.12°W	20:00–20:10	8 miles (13 km)	67 yards (61 m)	This tornado may have first begun in Point Blank, on the opposite shore of the Trinity River. In and near Point Blank, trees sustained damage, a church was destroyed, and homes were damaged. However, official data indicate that the tornado first impacted Onalaska, on the eastern side of Lake Livingston. In Onalaska, the tornado unroofed a combined store and post office; the building itself also lost its rear wall. The tornado injured two people, and losses reached $25,000.
F1	W of Hazel	Calloway	KY	36.50°N 88.35°W	20:15–?	1 mile (1.6 km)	50 yards (46 m)	A brief tornado destroyed one house and minimally damaged a few others. Some outbuildings and trees were levelled as well.
F2	NNE of Dayton	Liberty	TX	30.07°N 94.88°W	23:45–00:00	1.5 miles (2.4 km)	33 yards (30 m)	A brief tornado caused sizeable damage to trees, splintered utility poles, and partly unroofed a building. Several other structures were substantially damaged, one of which had its steel doors knocked down. Additionally, a horse died as a barn collapsed during the tornado. Grazulis did not list this tornado as an F2 or stronger.
F3	Mittie	Allen	LA	30.67°N 92.93°W	00:15–?	5.2 miles (8.4 km)	750 yards (690 m)	An intense tornado damaged or destroyed homes, sheds, barns, and trees. Two people sustained injuries, one of which was critical.
F2	S of Geronimo	Guadalupe	TX	29.65°N 97.97°W	02:45–?	0.5 miles (0.80 km)	20 yards (18 m)	A brief tornado tore the roof off a home and destroyed a barn nearby.
F2	Kaplan	Vermilion	LA	30.00°N 92.28°W	04:40–?	2 miles (3.2 km)	50 yards (46 m)	A brief tornado affected 35 homes and businesses as it passed through Kaplan. Four people were injured. Grazulis did not list this tornado as an F2 or stronger.

=== May 2 event ===
Confirmed tornadoes – Tuesday, May 2, 1967
F#	Location	County / Parish	State	Start Coord.	Time (UTC)	Path length	Max. width	Summary
F2	E of Bayou Pigeon	Iberville	LA	30.08°N 91.22°W	05:30–?	1 mile (1.6 km)	50 yards (46 m)	A brief tornado destroyed a mobile home and a delicatessen. A nearby home and a pilothouse also incurred damage. One person was injured.
F2	SSE of Lucedale	George	MS	30.90°N 88.58°W	07:25–?	0.1 miles (0.16 km)	10 yards (9.1 m)	A brief tornado dislodged a house, flipped a nearby mobile home, and downed a large tree. A utility room and a carport were torn loose as well. Grazulis did not list this tornado as an F2 or stronger.
F2	Dunean	Greenville	SC	34.83°N 82.42°W	00:10–?	1 mile (1.6 km)	67 yards (61 m)	A brief tornado significantly damaged three homes and slightly damaged about forty others. Windows, signage, and canopy-forming vegetation were broken. Grazulis did not list this tornado as an F2 or stronger.

== See also ==
- Tornado outbreak of April 22–23, 2020 – Produced an even stronger EF3 tornado in Onalaska that killed three and injured 33 others
- Climate of Minnesota
- List of North American tornadoes and tornado outbreaks

== Sources ==
- Brooks, Harold E. (April 2004). "On the Relationship of Tornado Path Length and Width to Intensity". Weather and Forecasting. 19 (2). Boston: American Meteorological Society: 310–319. Bibcode:2004WtFor..19..310B. doi:10.1175/1520-0434(2004)019<0310:OTROTP>2.0.CO;2.
- Grazulis, Thomas P. (July 1993). Significant Tornadoes 1680–1991: A Chronology and Analysis of Events. St. Johnsbury, Vermont: The Tornado Project of Environmental Films. ISBN 1-879362-03-1.
- Hagemeyer, Bartlett C. (September 1997). "Peninsular Florida Tornado Outbreaks". Weather and Forecasting. 12 (3). Boston: American Meteorological Society: 399–427. Bibcode:1997WtFor..12..399H. doi:10.1175/1520-0434(1997)012<0399:PFTO>2.0.CO;2.
- Hatfield, Karen (2017) [2007]. Krause, Tom (ed.). The April 30, 1967 Tornadoes in Southern Minnesota: A Retrospective (PDF) (Report) (Revised ed.). National Weather Service. Archived from the original (PDF) on 12 September 2017.
- U.S. Weather Bureau (April 1967a). "Storm Data and Unusual Weather Phenomena". Storm Data. 9 (4). Asheville, North Carolina: National Climatic Data Center.
- U.S. Weather Bureau (May 1967b). "Storm Data and Unusual Weather Phenomena". Storm Data. 9 (5). Asheville, North Carolina: National Climatic Data Center.
- National Weather Service (April 1967a). Storm Data Publication (Report). National Centers for Environmental Information – via Storm Events Database.
- National Weather Service (May 1967b). Storm Data Publication (Report). National Centers for Environmental Information – via Storm Events Database.
