= Twelve Mile Lake Township, Emmet County, Iowa =

Twelve Mile Lake Township
- Township
- Location in Emmet County
- Coordinates: 43°18′22″N 94°50′48″W
- Country: United States
- State: Iowa
- County: Emmet

Area
  - Total: 35.20 sq mi (91.17 km^{2})
  - Land: 34.86 sq mi (90.29 km^{2})
  - Water: 0.34 sq mi (0.88 km^{2}) 0.97%
- Elevation: 1,440 ft (440 m)

Population (2000)
  - Total: 202
  - Density: 5.7/sq mi (2.2/km^{2})
- Time zone: UTC-6 (CST)
  - Summer (DST): UTC-5 (CDT)
- ZIP codes: 51334, 51342, 51364, 51365
- GNIS feature ID: 0468800

Twelve Mile Lake Township is one of twelve townships in Emmet County, Iowa, USA. As of the 2000 census, its population was 202.

== History ==
This township is named from the Twelve Mile Lake, which was said to be twelve miles from Estherville.

== Geography ==
According to the United States Census Bureau, Twelve Mile Lake Township covers an area of 35.2 square miles (91.17 square kilometers); of this, 34.86 square miles (90.29 square kilometers, 99.03 percent) is land and 0.34 square miles (0.88 square kilometers, 0.97 percent) is water.

=== Cities, towns, villages ===
- Wallingford (west quarter)

=== Unincorporated towns ===
- Raleigh at 43.339404°N 94.868876°W

(This list is based on USGS data and may include former settlements.)

=== Adjacent townships ===
- Estherville Township (north)
- Center Township (northeast)
- High Lake Township (east)
- Walnut Township, Palo Alto County (southeast)
- Lost Island Township, Palo Alto County (south)
- Lake Township, Clay County (southwest)
- Lloyd Township, Dickinson County (west)
- Richland Township, Dickinson County (northwest)

=== Major highways ===
- Iowa Highway 4

=== Lakes ===
- Twelvemile Lake

== School districts ==
- Estherville–Lincoln Central Community School District
- Graettinger–Terril Community School District

== Political districts ==
- Iowa's 4th congressional district
- State House District 7
- State Senate District 4
