= High Lake Township, Emmet County, Iowa =

High Lake Township
- Township
- Location in Emmet County
- Coordinates: 43°18′07″N 94°44′00″W
- Country: United States
- State: Iowa
- County: Emmet

Area
  - Total: 35.7 sq mi (92.5 km^{2})
  - Land: 33.39 sq mi (86.47 km^{2})
  - Water: 2.33 sq mi (6.03 km^{2}) 6.52%
- Elevation: 1,266 ft (386 m)

Population (2000)
  - Total: 461
  - Density: 14/sq mi (5.3/km^{2})
- Time zone: UTC-6 (CST)
  - Summer (DST): UTC-5 (CDT)
- ZIP codes: 51334, 51342, 51365
- GNIS feature ID: 0468033

High Lake Township is one of twelve townships in Emmet County, Iowa, United States. As of the 2000 census, its population was 461.

== Geography ==
According to the United States Census Bureau, High Lake Township covers an area of 35.71 square miles (92.5 square kilometers); of this, 33.38 square miles (86.47 square kilometers, 93.48 percent) is land and 2.33 square miles (6.03 square kilometers, 6.52 percent) is water.

=== Cities, towns, villages ===
- Wallingford (east three-quarters)

=== Adjacent townships ===
- Center Township (north)
- Swan Lake Township (northeast)
- Jack Creek Township (east)
- Vernon Township, Palo Alto County (southeast)
- Walnut Township, Palo Alto County (south)
- Lost Island Township, Palo Alto County (southwest)
- Twelve Mile Lake Township (west)
- Estherville Township (northwest)

=== Cemeteries ===
The township contains these two cemeteries: High Lake and Wallingford.

=== Major highways ===
- Iowa Highway 4

=== Airports and landing strips ===
- Wallingford Landing Strip

=== Lakes ===
- Bur Oak Lake
- High Lake
- Ingham Lake

=== Landmarks ===
- Wolden County Park

== School districts ==
- Estherville–Lincoln Central Community School District
- Graettinger–Terril Community School District
- Armstrong–Ringsted Community School District

== Political districts ==
- Iowa's 4th congressional district
- State House District 7
- State Senate District 4
