= Jack Creek Township, Emmet County, Iowa =

Jack Creek Township
- Township
- Location in Emmet County
- Coordinates: 43°17′59″N 94°37′11″W
- Country: United States
- State: Iowa
- County: Emmet

Area
  - Total: 35.71 sq mi (92.48 km^{2})
  - Land: 35.67 sq mi (92.39 km^{2})
  - Water: 0.035 sq mi (0.09 km^{2}) 0.1%
- Elevation: 1,250 ft (381 m)

Population (2000)
  - Total: 135
  - Density: 3.9/sq mi (1.5/km^{2})
- Time zone: UTC-6 (CST)
  - Summer (DST): UTC-5 (CDT)
- ZIP codes: 50578, 51342, 51365
- GNIS feature ID: 0468089

Jack Creek Township is one of twelve townships in Emmet County, Iowa, USA. As of the 2000 census, its population was 135.

== History ==
Jack Creek Township was created in 1883.

== Geography ==
According to the United States Census Bureau, Jack Creek Township covers an area of 35.71 square miles (92.48 square kilometers); of this, 35.67 square miles (92.39 square kilometers, 99.9 percent) is land and 0.03 square miles (0.09 square kilometers, 0.1 percent) is water.

=== Unincorporated towns ===
- Hoprig at 43.269961°N 94.619424°W

(This list is based on USGS data and may include former settlements.)

=== Extinct towns ===
- Bubona at 43.327182°N 94.659703°W

(These towns are listed as "historical" by the USGS.)

=== Adjacent townships ===
- Swan Lake Township (north)
- Armstrong Grove Township (northeast)
- Denmark Township (east)
- Independence Township, Palo Alto County (southeast)
- Vernon Township, Palo Alto County (south)
- Walnut Township, Palo Alto County (southwest)
- High Lake Township (west)
- Center Township (northwest)

== School districts ==
- Armstrong–Ringsted Community School District
- Estherville–Lincoln Central Community School District
- Graettinger Community School District

== Political districts ==
- Iowa's 4th congressional district
- State House District 7
- State Senate District 4
