= Estherville Township, Emmet County, Iowa =

Estherville Township
- Township
- Location in Emmet County
- Coordinates: 43°23′03″N 94°50′56″W
- Country: United States
- State: Iowa
- County: Emmet

Area
  - Total: 36.15 sq mi (93.63 km^{2})
  - Land: 35.81 sq mi (92.75 km^{2})
  - Water: 0.34 sq mi (0.88 km^{2}) 0.94%
- Elevation: 1,427 ft (435 m)

Population (2000)
  - Total: 7,077
  - Density: 198/sq mi (76.3/km^{2})
- Time zone: UTC-6 (CST)
  - Summer (DST): UTC-5 (CDT)
- ZIP codes: 51334, 51364
- GNIS feature ID: 0467798

Estherville Township is one of twelve townships in Emmet County, Iowa, United States. As of the 2000 census, its population was 7,077.

== History ==
Estherville Township takes its name from the county seat of Estherville. It was created prior to 1876, but the exact date is unknown because the records were destroyed in a courthouse fire.

== Geography ==
According to the United States Census Bureau, Estherville Township covers an area of 36.15 square miles (93.63 square kilometers); of this, 35.81 square miles (92.75 square kilometers, 99.06 percent) is land and 0.34 square miles (0.88 square kilometers, 0.94 percent) is water.

=== Cities, towns, villages ===
- Estherville

=== Adjacent townships ===
- Emmet Township (north)
- Ellsworth Township (northeast)
- Center Township (east)
- High Lake Township (southeast)
- Twelve Mile Lake Township (south)
- Lloyd Township, Dickinson County (southwest)
- Richland Township, Dickinson County (west)
- Superior Township, Dickinson County (northwest)

=== Cemeteries ===
The township contains these five cemeteries: East Side, Estherville Lutheran, Norwegian, Oak Hill and Saint Patricks.

=== Major highways ===
- Iowa Highway 4
- Iowa Highway 9

=== Lakes ===
- Cheever Lake
- Fourmile Lake

=== Landmarks ===
- Fort Defiance State Park
- Iowa Lakes Community College

== School districts ==
- Estherville–Lincoln Central Community School District

== Political districts ==
- Iowa's 4th congressional district
- State House District 7
- State Senate District 4
