= Ellsworth Township, Emmet County, Iowa =

Ellsworth Township
- Township
- Location in Emmet County
- Coordinates: 43°28′00″N 94°43′43″W
- Country: United States
- State: Iowa
- County: Emmet

Area
  - Total: 30.00 sq mi (77.70 km^{2})
  - Land: 30.00 sq mi (77.70 km^{2})
  - Water: 0 sq mi (0 km^{2}) 0%
- Elevation: 1,325 ft (404 m)

Population (20)
  - Total: 93
  - Density: 3.2/sq mi (1.24/km^{2})
- Time zone: UTC-6 (CST)
  - Summer (DST): UTC-5 (CDT)
- ZIP codes: 50531, 51334
- GNIS feature ID: 0467787

Ellsworth Township is one of twelve townships in Emmet County, Iowa, USA. As of the 2020 census, its population was 93.

== Geography ==
According to the United States Census Bureau, Ellsworth Township covers an area of 29.06 square miles (75.3 square kilometers).

=== Unincorporated towns ===
- Huntington at 43.491624°N 94.79193°W

(This list is based on USGS data and may include former settlements.)

=== Adjacent townships ===
- Lincoln Township (east)
- Swan Lake Township (southeast)
- Center Township (south)
- Estherville Township (southwest)
- Emmet Township (west)

=== Cemeteries ===
The township contains these two cemeteries: Ellsworth and Prosser.

=== Major highways ===
- Iowa Highway 4

== School districts ==
- Estherville–Lincoln Central Community School District

== Political districts ==
- Iowa's 4th congressional district
- State House District 7
- State Senate District 4
