= Emmet County Courthouse (Iowa) =

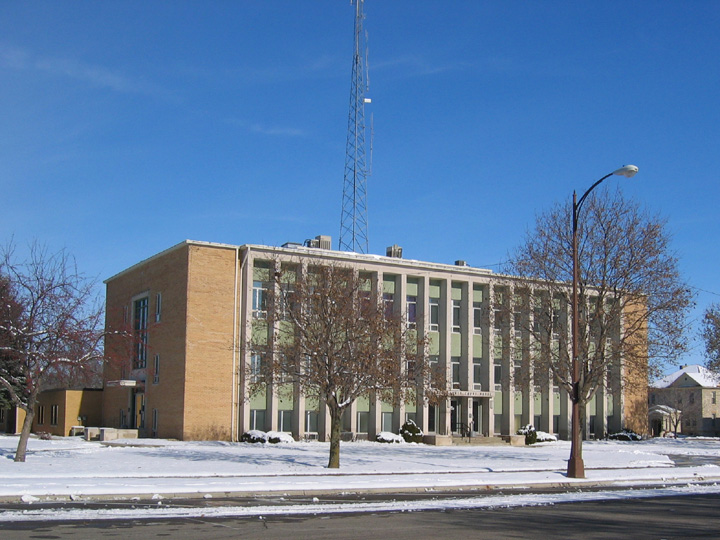
- Emmet County Courthouse
- Interactive map of the Emmet County Courthouse area

General information
- Type: Courthouse
- Architectural style: Modern
- Location: 609 1st Avenue North, Estherville, Iowa, United States
- Coordinates: 43.403357°N 94.836049°W
- Inaugurated: September 1958

Technical details
- Floor count: Three

The Emmet County Courthouse is located in Estherville, Iowa, United States. It is the third building to house court functions and county administration.

== History ==
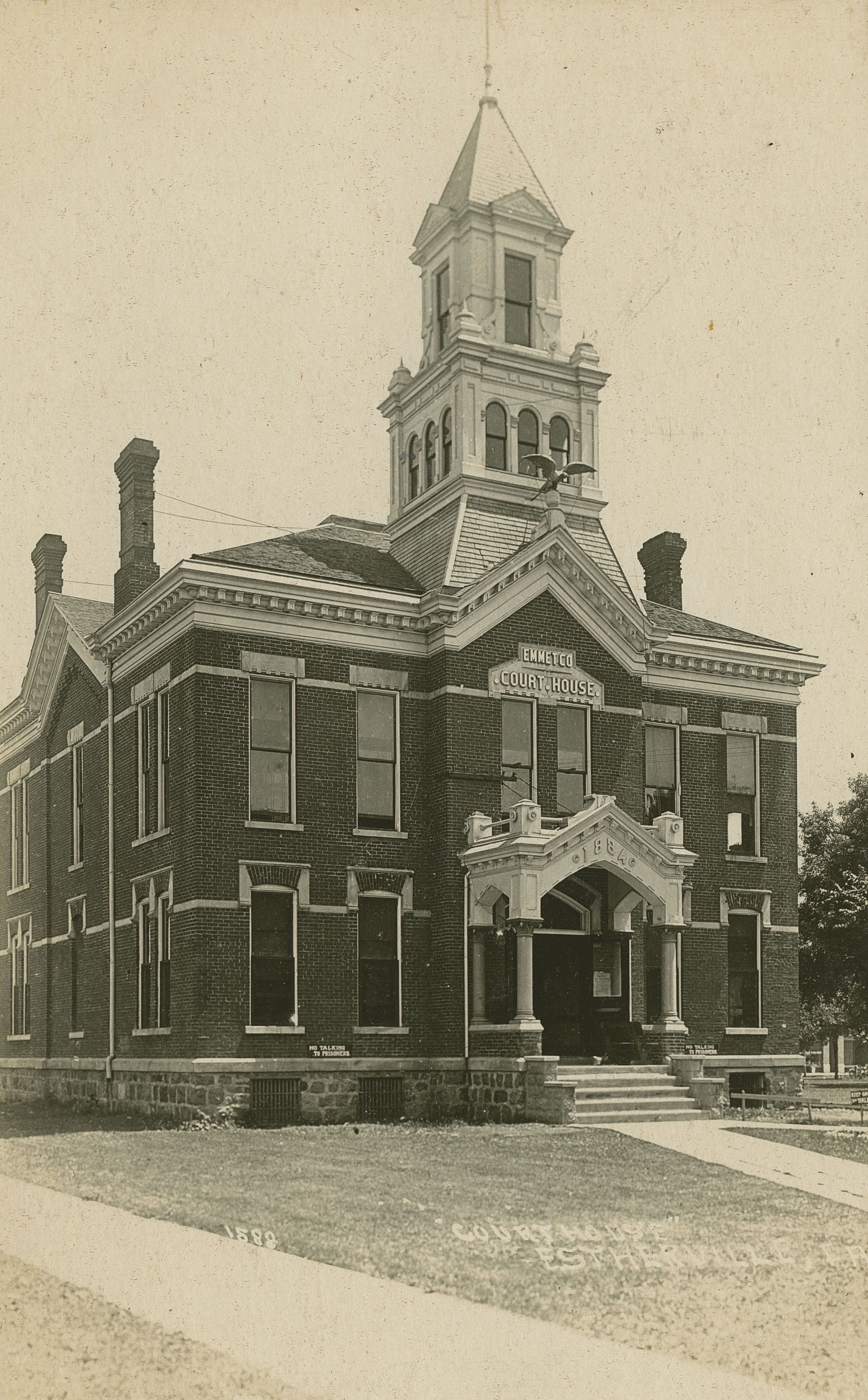
1884 courthouse

Emmet County was created in 1851, but because it lacked settlers, no county government was established until 1858 and a vote was taken on February 7, 1859. A group of three commissioners chose Estherville to be the county seat. A Fort Dodge, Iowa contractor received a contract to build a schoolhouse and a courthouse in 1859. The schoolhouse was completed and the construction on the courthouse was under when the county realized it could not pay the contractor with the land it promised because the surveyor general would not accept the surveys done in Emmet County and release the land. The contractor established land agencies in the eastern United States that issued worthless land deeds. When the landowners arrived in the county they found out they had to homestead the land in order to receive the land from the government. The completed school building was moved to a different location and it was used as the courthouse until 1876 when it was destroyed by fire.

On October 20, 1879, the county seat was moved to Swan Lake in the center of the county, but because of litigation over the move, a courthouse was never built there. There was also little in the way of settlement in this part of the county. Before the issue could be resolved in the courts, the county seat was moved back to Estherville after a vote in 1882. In 1884 a two-story, brick, Italiante courthouse was built for $11,718. It featured bracketed eaves, a decorative porch surrounding the main entrance, and a bell tower. A roof fire on April 2, 1918, did little damage to the structure.

The current facility opened in September 1958 at a cost of $374,000. The three-story building is faced with tan brick and Indiana Limestone. The front facade is accented by deeply recessed windows framed by limestone-clad piers. The courthouse houses court and most administrative offices for Emmet County.
