= KILR =

KILR may refer to:

- KILR (AM), a radio station (1070 AM) licensed to Estherville, Iowa, United States
- KILR-FM, a radio station (95.9 FM) licensed to Estherville, Iowa, United States
