= Swan Lake Township, Emmet County, Iowa =

Swan Lake Township
- Township
- Location in Emmet County
- Coordinates: 43°23′20″N 94°37′21″W
- Country: United States
- State: Iowa
- County: Emmet

Area
  - Total: 36.46 sq mi (94.42 km^{2})
  - Land: 35.64 sq mi (92.32 km^{2})
  - Water: 0.81 sq mi (2.1 km^{2}) 2.22%
- Elevation: 1,263 ft (385 m)

Population (2000)
  - Total: 177
  - Density: 4.9/sq mi (1.9/km^{2})
- Time zone: UTC-6 (CST)
  - Summer (DST): UTC-5 (CDT)
- ZIP codes: 50514, 50531, 50578, 51334
- GNIS feature ID: 0468771

Swan Lake Township is one of twelve townships in Emmet County, Iowa, USA. As of the 2000 census, its population was 177.

== Geography ==
According to the United States Census Bureau, Swan Lake Township covers an area of 36.46 square miles (94.42 square kilometers); of this, 35.64 square miles (92.32 square kilometers, 97.78 percent) is land and 0.81 square miles (2.1 square kilometers, 2.22 percent) is water.

=== Unincorporated towns ===
- Gridley at 43.399403°N 94.573311°W
- Maple Hill at 43.392181°N 94.625257°W

(This list is based on USGS data and may include former settlements.)

=== Adjacent townships ===
- Lincoln Township (north)
- Iowa Lake Township (northeast)
- Armstrong Grove Township (east)
- Denmark Township (southeast)
- Jack Creek Township (south)
- High Lake Township (southwest)
- Center Township (west)
- Ellsworth Township (northwest)

=== Cemeteries ===
The township contains Swan lake Cemetery.

=== Major highways ===
- Iowa Highway 9

== School districts ==
- Armstrong–Ringsted Community School District
- Estherville–Lincoln Central Community School District

== Political districts ==
- Iowa's 4th congressional district
- State House District 7
- State Senate District 4
