= Lincoln Township, Emmet County, Iowa =

Lincoln Township
- Township
- Location in Emmet County
- Coordinates: 43°27′57″N 94°36′59″W
- Country: United States
- State: Iowa
- County: Emmet

Area
  - Total: 28.60 sq mi (74.08 km^{2})
  - Land: 27.14 sq mi (70.29 km^{2})
  - Water: 1.46 sq mi (3.79 km^{2}) 5.12%
- Elevation: 1,286 ft (392 m)

Population (2000)
  - Total: 220
  - Density: 8.0/sq mi (3.1/km^{2})
- Time zone: UTC-6 (CST)
  - Summer (DST): UTC-5 (CDT)
- ZIP codes: 50531, 51334
- GNIS feature ID: 0468248

Lincoln Township is one of twelve townships in Emmet County, Iowa, USA. As of the 2000 census, its population was 220.

== History ==
Lincoln Township was created in 1887. It was named for Abraham Lincoln, sixteenth President of the United States.

== Geography ==
According to the United States Census Bureau, Lincoln Township covers an area of 28.6 square miles (74.08 square kilometers); of this, 27.14 square miles (70.29 square kilometers, 94.88 percent) is land and 1.46 square miles (3.79 square kilometers, 5.12 percent) is water.

=== Cities, towns, villages ===
- Dolliver

=== Adjacent townships ===
- Iowa Lake Township (east)
- Armstrong Grove Township (southeast)
- Swan Lake Township (south)
- Center Township (southwest)
- Ellsworth Township (west)

=== Cemeteries ===
The township contains these two cemeteries: Lincoln Township and Palestine.

=== Rivers ===
- Des Moines River (east fork)

=== Lakes ===
- Okampanpeedan Lake (also known as Tuttle Lake)

=== Landmarks ===
- Okamanpeedan State Park
- Tuttle Lake County Park

== School districts ==
- Armstrong–Ringsted Community School District
- Estherville–Lincoln Central Community School District

== Political districts ==
- Iowa's 4th congressional district
- State House District 7
- State Senate District 4
