= Gruver =

Gruver may refer to:

- Gruver, Iowa
- Gruver, Texas
- Nancy Gruver (d. 1990), American bridge player
