= Center Township, Emmet County, Iowa =

Center Township
- Township
- Location in Emmet County
- Coordinates: 43°23′19″N 94°43′24″W
- Country: United States
- State: Iowa
- County: Emmet

Area
  - Total: 36.00 sq mi (93.24 km^{2})
  - Land: 35.58 sq mi (92.15 km^{2})
  - Water: 0.42 sq mi (1.09 km^{2}) 1.17%
- Elevation: 1,319 ft (402 m)

Population (2000)
  - Total: 459
  - Density: 13/sq mi (4.9/km^{2})
- Time zone: UTC-6 (CST)
  - Summer (DST): UTC-5 (CDT)
- ZIP codes: 51334, 51344
- GNIS feature ID: 0467575

Center Township is one of twelve townships in Emmet County, Iowa, United States. As of the 2000 census, its population was 459.

== History ==
Center Township was created in 1876. It was named from its central location.

== Geography ==
According to the United States Census Bureau, Center Township covers an area of 36.45 square miles (94.41 square kilometers); of this, 36.03 square miles (93.32 square kilometers, 98.85 percent) is land and 0.42 square miles (1.09 square kilometers, 1.15 percent) is water.

=== Cities, towns, villages ===
- Gruver

=== Adjacent townships ===
- Ellsworth Township (north)
- Lincoln Township (northeast)
- Swan Lake Township (east)
- Jack Creek Township (southeast)
- High Lake Township (south)
- Twelve Mile Lake Township (southwest)
- Estherville Township (west)
- Emmet Township (northwest)

=== Cemeteries ===
The township contains Swan Lake Village Cemetery.

=== Major highways ===
- Iowa Highway 9

=== Airports and landing strips ===
- Estherville Municipal Airport

== School districts ==
- Estherville–Lincoln Central Community School District

== Political districts ==
- Iowa's 4th congressional district
- State House District 7
- State Senate District 4
