= Armstrong Grove Township, Emmet County, Iowa =

Armstrong Grove Township
- Township
- Location in Emmet County
- Coordinates: 43°23′06″N 94°30′10″W
- Country: United States
- State: Iowa
- County: Emmet

Area
  - Total: 36.00 sq mi (93.24 km^{2})
  - Land: 36.00 sq mi (93.24 km^{2})
  - Water: 0 sq mi (0 km^{2}) 0%
- Elevation: 1,250 ft (380 m)

Population (2000)
  - Total: 1,192
  - Density: 33/sq mi (12.6/km^{2})
- Time zone: UTC-6 (CST)
  - Summer (DST): UTC-5 (CDT)
- ZIP code: 50514
- GNIS feature ID: 0467399

Armstrong Grove Township is one of twelve townships in Emmet County, Iowa, United States. As of the 2000 census, its population was 1,192.

== History ==
Armstrong Grove is named for the early settler Armstrong who in the year 1856 claimed 160 acres (65 ha) of land in a grove on the Des Moines River.

== Geography ==
According to the United States Census Bureau, Armstrong Grove Township covers an area of 36.45 square miles (94.41 square kilometers).

=== Cities, towns, villages ===
- Armstrong

=== Unincorporated towns ===
- Halfa at 43.351904°N 94.541922°W

(This list is based on USGS data and may include former settlements.)

=== Adjacent townships ===
- Iowa Lake Township (north)
- Eagle Township, Kossuth County (northeast)
- Swea Township, Kossuth County (east)
- Seneca Township, Kossuth County (southeast)
- Denmark Township (south)
- Jack Creek Township (southwest)
- Swan Lake Township (west)
- Lincoln Township (northwest)

=== Cemeteries ===
The township contains these three cemeteries: Armstrong Grove, Mount Calvary and Saint Marys Catholic.

=== Major highways ===
- Iowa Highway 9
- Iowa Highway 15

== School districts ==
- Armstrong–Ringsted Community School District

== Political districts ==
- Iowa's 4th congressional district
- State House District 7
- State Senate District 4

== Bibliography ==
- United States Census Bureau 2008 TIGER/Line Shapefiles
- United States Board on Geographic Names (GNIS)
- United States National Atlas
