= Lloyd Township, Dickinson County, Iowa =

Lloyd Township
- Township
- Location in Dickinson County
- Coordinates: 43°18′03″N 94°58′20″W
- Country: United States
- State: Iowa
- County: Dickinson

Area
  - Total: 35.88 sq mi (92.92 km^{2})
  - Land: 35.88 sq mi (92.92 km^{2})
  - Water: 0 sq mi (0 km^{2}) 0%
- Elevation: 1,430 ft (436 m)

Population (2000)
  - Total: 616
  - Density: 17/sq mi (6.6/km^{2})
- Time zone: UTC-6 (CST)
  - Summer (DST): UTC-5 (CDT)
- ZIP code: 51364
- GNIS feature ID: 0468290

Lloyd Township is one of twelve townships in Dickinson County, Iowa, USA. As of the 2000 census, its population was 616.

== History ==
Lloyd Township is named for John Lloyd, a pioneer settler.

== Geography ==
According to the United States Census Bureau, Lloyd Township covers an area of 35.88 square miles (92.92 square kilometers).

=== Cities, towns, villages ===
- Terril

=== Adjacent townships ===
- Richland Township (north)
- Estherville Township, Emmet County (northeast)
- Twelve Mile Lake Township, Emmet County (east)
- Lost Island Township, Palo Alto County (southeast)
- Lake Township, Clay County (south)
- Meadow Township, Clay County (southwest)
- Milford Township (west)
- Center Grove Township (northwest)

=== Cemeteries ===
The township contains Fairview Cemetery.

== School districts ==
- Terril Community School District

== Political districts ==
- Iowa's 5th congressional district
- State House District 06
- State Senate District 03
