= Emmet Township, Emmet County, Iowa =

Emmet Township
- Township
- Location in Emmet County
- Coordinates: 43°27′43″N 94°51′23″W
- Country: United States
- State: Iowa
- County: Emmet

Area
  - Total: 28.4 sq mi (73.6 km^{2})
  - Land: 28.10 sq mi (72.78 km^{2})
  - Water: 0.32 sq mi (0.82 km^{2}) 1.11%
- Elevation: 1,329 ft (405 m)

Population (2000)
  - Total: 178
  - Density: 6.2/sq mi (2.4/km^{2})
- Time zone: UTC-6 (CST)
  - Summer (DST): UTC-5 (CDT)
- ZIP code: 51334
- GNIS feature ID: 0467791

Emmet Township is one of twelve townships in Emmet County, Iowa, USA. As of the 2000 census, its population was 178.

== History ==
Emmet Township is named from the county. It was created prior to 1876, but the exact date is unknown because records were lost in a courthouse fire.

== Geography ==
According to the United States Census Bureau, Emmet Township covers an area of 28.42 square miles (73.6 square kilometers); of this, 28.1 square miles (72.78 square kilometers, 98.89 percent) is land and 0.32 square miles (0.82 square kilometers, 1.11 percent) is water.

=== Adjacent townships ===
- Ellsworth Township (east)
- Center Township (southeast)
- Estherville Township (south)
- Richland Township, Dickinson County (southwest)
- Superior Township, Dickinson County (west)

=== Major highways ===
- Iowa Highway 4

=== Lakes ===
- Eagle Lake

== School districts ==
- Estherville–Lincoln Central Community School District

== Political districts ==
- Iowa's 4th congressional district
- State House District 7
- State Senate District 4
