= Iowa Lake Township, Emmet County, Iowa =

Iowa Lake Township
- Township
- Location in Emmet County
- Coordinates: 43°27′35″N 94°30′07″W
- Country: United States
- State: Iowa
- County: Emmet

Area
  - Total: 28.66 sq mi (74.24 km^{2})
  - Land: 28.09 sq mi (72.74 km^{2})
  - Water: 0.58 sq mi (1.5 km^{2}) 2.02%
- Elevation: 1,240 ft (378 m)

Population (2000)
  - Total: 145
  - Density: 5.2/sq mi (2/km^{2})
- Time zone: UTC-6 (CST)
  - Summer (DST): UTC-5 (CDT)
- ZIP codes: 50514, 50531
- GNIS feature ID: 0468087

Iowa Lake Township is one of twelve townships in Emmet County, Iowa, USA. As of the 2000 census, its population was 145.

== Geography ==
According to the United States Census Bureau, Iowa Lake Township covers an area of 28.66 square miles (74.24 square kilometers); of this, 28.08 square miles (72.74 square kilometers, 97.98 percent) is land and 0.58 square miles (1.5 square kilometers, 2.02 percent) is water.

=== Adjacent townships ===
- Eagle Township, Kossuth County (east)
- Swea Township, Kossuth County (southeast)
- Armstrong Grove Township (south)
- Swan Lake Township (southwest)
- Lincoln Township (west)

=== Major highways ===
- Iowa Highway 15

== School districts ==
- Armstrong–Ringsted Community School District

== Political districts ==
- Iowa's 4th congressional district
- State House District 7
- State Senate District 4
