= Wallingford, Iowa =

- City
- Location of Wallingford, Iowa
- Coordinates: 43°19′13″N 94°47′32″W
- Country: United States
- State: Iowa
- County: Emmet
- Townships: High Lake; Twelve Mile Lake
- Founded: 1882
- Incorporated: 1913

Area
  - Total: 0.99 sq mi (2.56 km^{2})
  - Land: 0.99 sq mi (2.56 km^{2})
  - Water: 0 sq mi (0.00 km^{2})
- Elevation: 1,270 ft (390 m)

Population (2020)
  - Total: 165
  - Density: 167/sq mi (64.5/km^{2})
- Time zone: UTC-6 (Central (CST))
  - Summer (DST): UTC-5 (CDT)
- ZIP code: 51365
- Area code: 712
- FIPS code: 19-81975
- GNIS feature ID: 2397179

Wallingford is a city in High Lake and Twelve Mile Lake townships Emmet County, Iowa, United States. The population was 165 at the 2020 census.

== History ==
Wallingford was platted in 1882 and incorporated in late 1913.

== Geography ==
According to the United States Census Bureau, the city has a total area of 0.97 square miles (2.51 km^{2}), all land.

== Demographics ==
Historical populations
Year	Pop.	±%
1920	197	—
1930	225	+14.2%
1940	233	+3.6%
1950	229	−1.7%
1960	228	−0.4%
1970	245	+7.5%
1980	256	+4.5%
1990	235	−8.2%
2000	210	−10.6%
2010	197	−6.2%
2019	173	−12.2%
2020	165	−4.6%
Source:"U.S. Census website". United States Census Bureau. and Iowa Data Center; Source: U.S. Decennial Census

=== 2020 census ===
As of the census of 2020, there were 165 people, 77 households, and 47 families residing in the city. The population density was 167.0 inhabitants per square mile (64.5/km^{2}). There were 78 housing units at an average density of 79.0 per square mile (30.5/km^{2}). The racial makeup of the city was 86.1% White, 0.0% Black or African American, 4.8% Native American, 0.0% Asian, 0.0% Pacific Islander, 7.9% from other races and 1.2% from two or more races. Hispanic or Latino persons of any race comprised 16.4% of the population.

Of the 77 households, 32.5% of which had children under the age of 18 living with them, 46.8% were married couples living together, 6.5% were cohabitating couples, 24.7% had a female householder with no spouse or partner present and 22.1% had a male householder with no spouse or partner present. 39.0% of all households were non-families. 33.8% of all households were made up of individuals, 9.1% had someone living alone who was 65 years old or older.

The median age in the city was 48.5 years. 20.0% of the residents were under the age of 20; 5.5% were between the ages of 20 and 24; 17.6% were from 25 and 44; 30.9% were from 45 and 64; and 26.1% were 65 years of age or older. The gender makeup of the city was 47.9% male and 52.1% female.

=== 2010 census ===
As of the census of 2010, there were 197 people, 79 households, and 54 families living in the city. The population density was 203.1 inhabitants per square mile (78.4/km^{2}). There were 87 housing units at an average density of 89.7 per square mile (34.6/km^{2}). The racial makeup of the city was 99.5% White and 0.5% African American. Hispanic or Latino of any race were 0.5% of the population.

There were 79 households, of which 32.9% had children under the age of 18 living with them, 57.0% were married couples living together, 6.3% had a female householder with no husband present, 5.1% had a male householder with no wife present, and 31.6% were non-families. 26.6% of all households were made up of individuals, and 6.3% had someone living alone who was 65 years of age or older. The average household size was 2.49 and the average family size was 2.96.

The median age in the city was 35.9 years. 26.4% of residents were under the age of 18; 8.1% were between the ages of 18 and 24; 26.4% were from 25 to 44; 25.9% were from 45 to 64; and 13.2% were 65 years of age or older. The gender makeup of the city was 48.7% male and 51.3% female.

=== 2000 census ===
As of the census of 2000, there were 210 people, 78 households, and 54 families living in the city. The population density was 215.4 inhabitants per square mile (83.2/km^{2}). There were 88 housing units at an average density of 90.3 per square mile (34.9/km^{2}). The racial makeup of the city was 96.19% White, 2.86% Native American, 0.95% from other races. Hispanic or Latino of any race were 5.71% of the population.

There were 78 households, out of which 32.1% had children under the age of 18 living with them, 64.1% were married couples living together, 3.8% had a female householder with no husband present, and 29.5% were non-families. 24.4% of all households were made up of individuals, and 10.3% had someone living alone who was 65 years of age or older. The average household size was 2.69 and the average family size was 3.27.

In the city, the population was spread out, with 30.5% under the age of 18, 7.6% from 18 to 24, 27.1% from 25 to 44, 20.5% from 45 to 64, and 14.3% who were 65 years of age or older. The median age was 35 years. For every 100 females, there were 89.2 males. For every 100 females age 18 and over, there were 92.1 males.

The median income for a household in the city was $39,500, and the median income for a family was $44,375. Males had a median income of $28,125 versus $18,750 for females. The per capita income for the city was $13,137. About 4.9% of families and 9.4% of the population were below the poverty line, including 15.5% of those under the age of eighteen and 17.4% of those 65 or over.

== Education ==
Estherville–Lincoln Central Community School District operates area public schools. It was established on July 1, 1997, by the merger of the Estherville and Lincoln Central school districts.

== Gallery ==
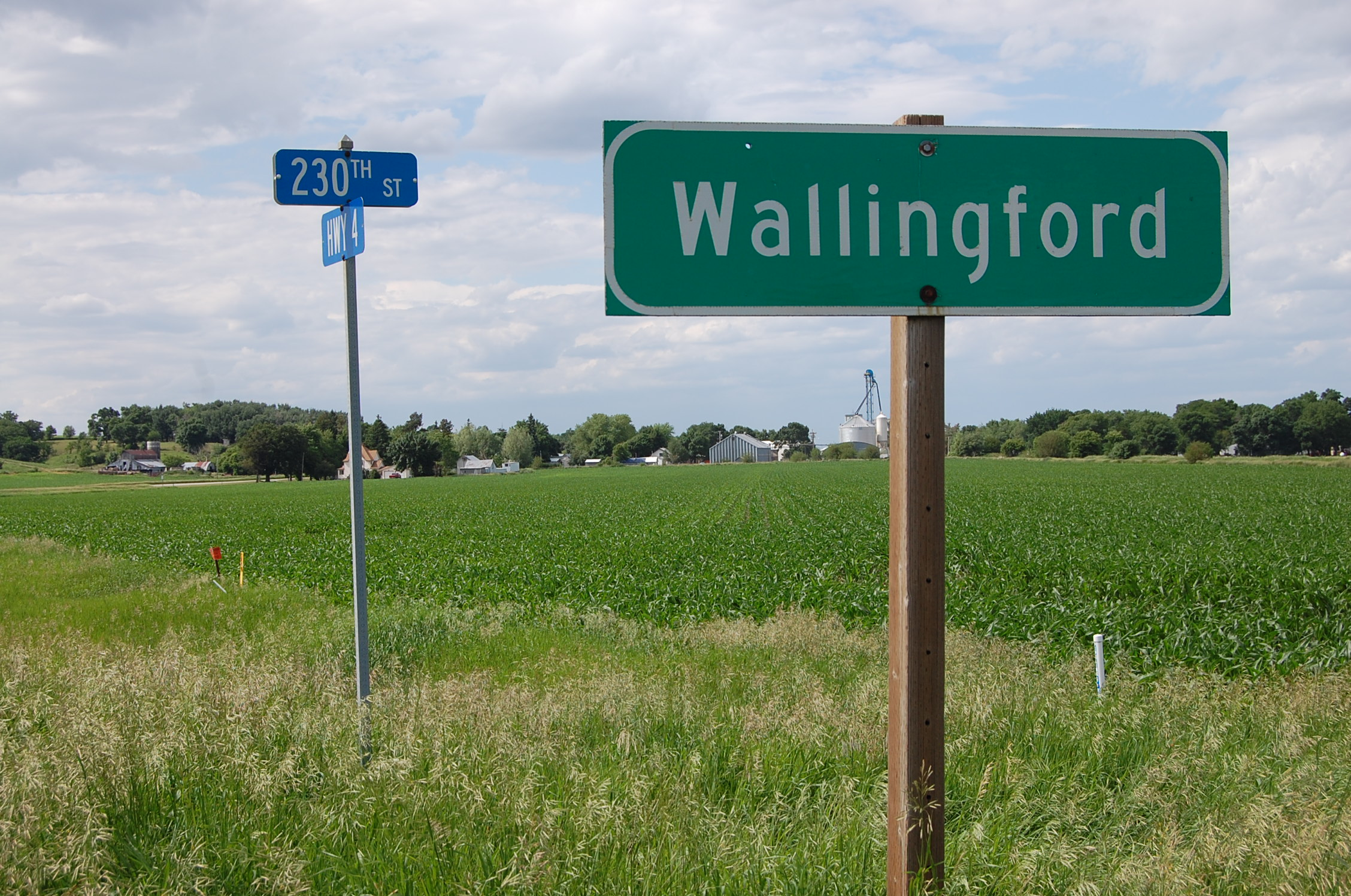
Approaching Wallingford whilst heading north on Iowa Highway 4.

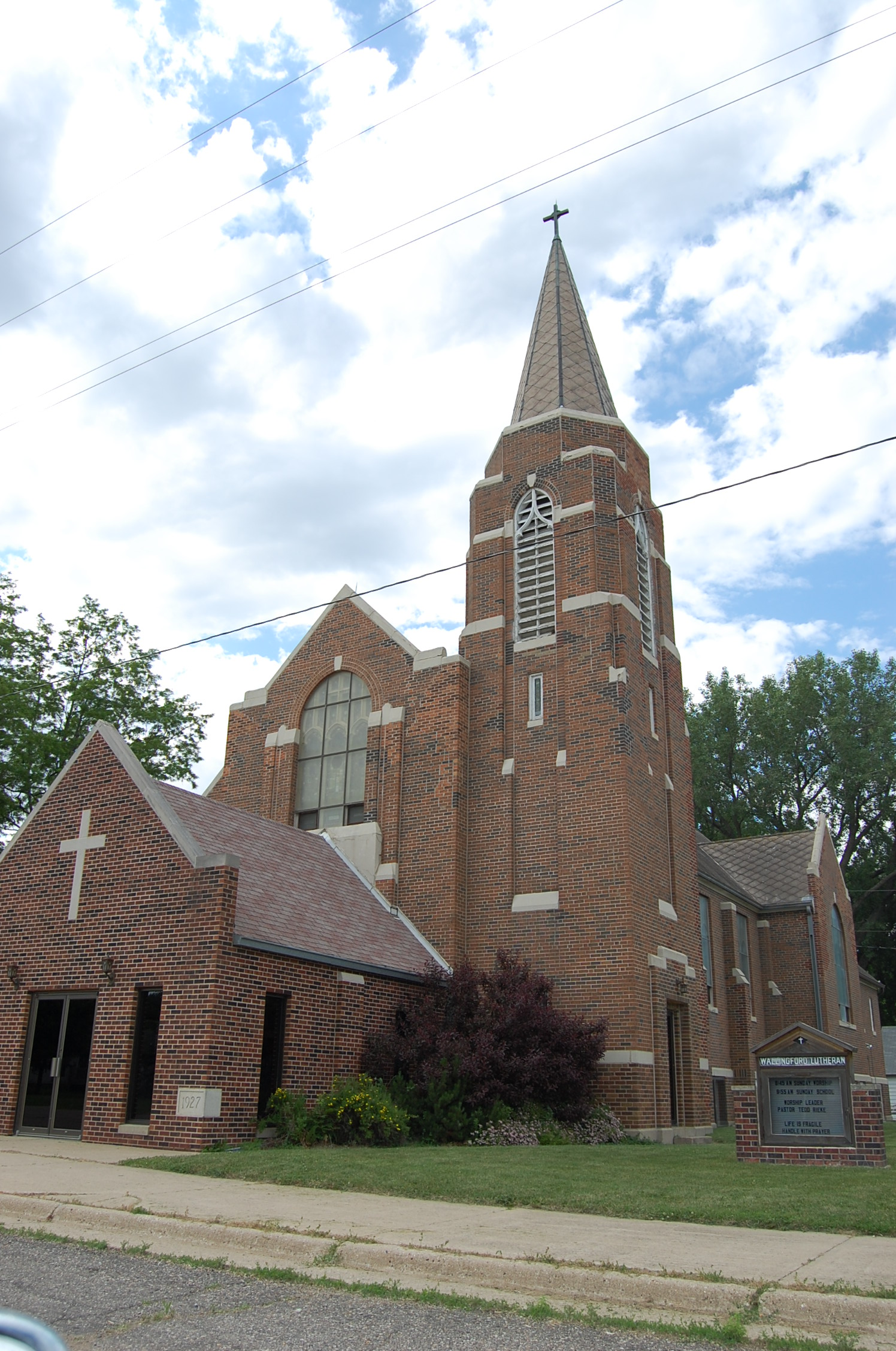
The Wallingford Lutheran Church on St. James Ave.

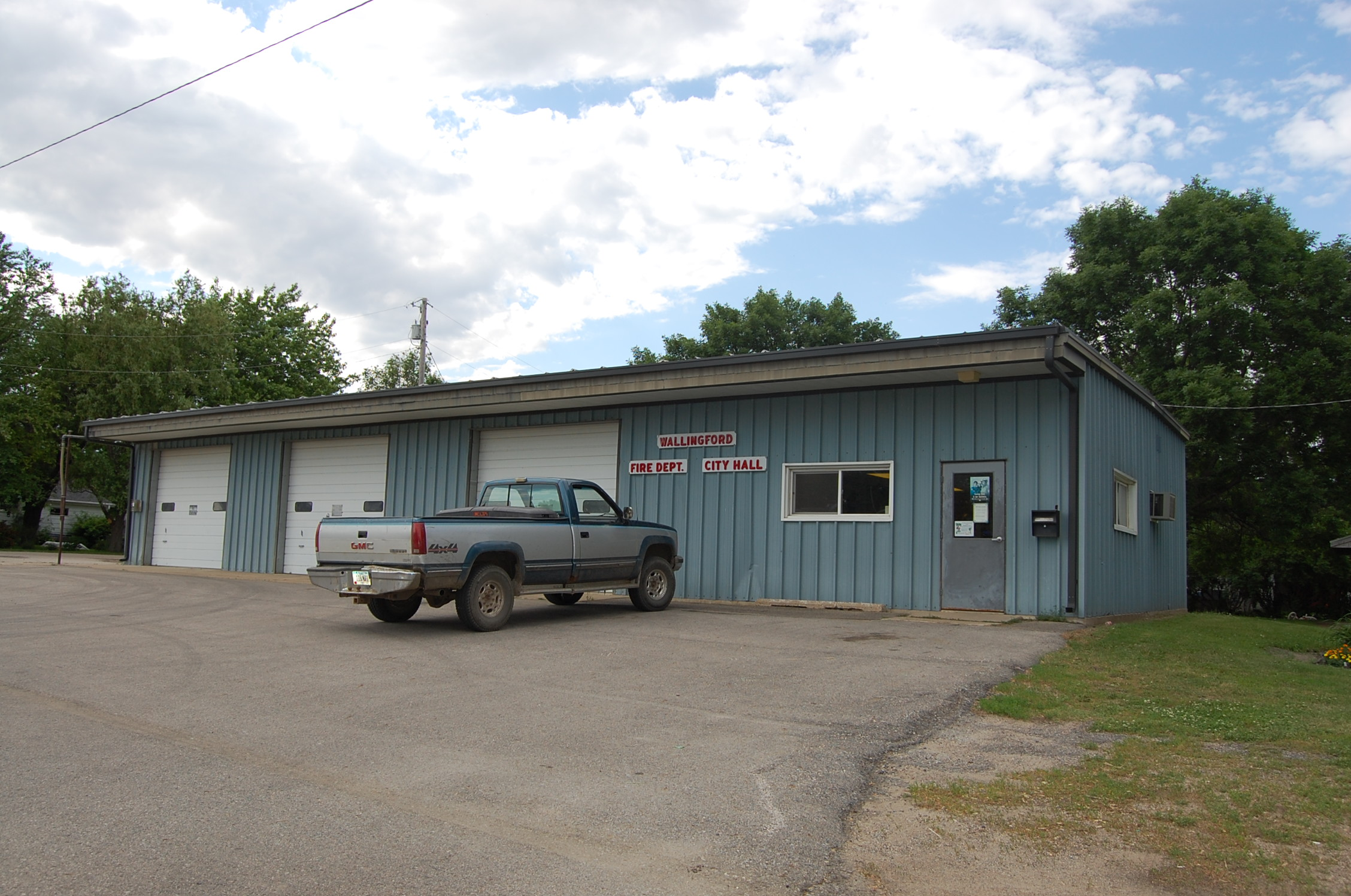
The Fire Department and City Hall.
