= Sherie Scheer =

American photographer

Sherie Scheer (born 1940) is an American photographer. Long active in Venice, Los Angeles, she is known for her hand-colored panoramic photographs, although she later turned to fantasy portraiture.

== Early life and education ==
Born in Estherville, Iowa, Scheer graduated from the University of California, Los Angeles with a bachelor's degree in 1969; she received a master's degree from that institution in 1971.

== Collections ==
- Center for Creative Photography
- Gallery van Haarlem
- Metropolitan Museum of Art
- Portland Art Museum the National Gallery of Australia,
- Seattle Art Museum
- Smithsonian American Art Museum
