= Okamanpeedan Lake =

Lake in the state of Minnesota, United States

- Okamanpadu Lake
- Location within Iowa Location within the United States
- Location: Emmet County, Iowa / Martin County, Minnesota, US
- Coordinates: 43°30′20″N 94°34′30″W
- Primary inflows: East Fork of the Des Moines River
- Primary outflows: East Fork of the Des Moines River
- Catchment area: 120,056 acres (48,585 ha)
- Basin countries: United States
- Surface area: 2,300 acres (930 ha)
- Surface elevation: 1,227 feet (374 m)

Okamanpeedan (or Okamanpadu) Lake, partially located in Martin County, Minnesota, and Emmet County, Iowa, is also known as Tuttle Lake. Okamanpeedan Lake is a roughly 2,300-acre (9.3 km^{2}) riverine lake located on the East Fork of the Des Moines River. It has an average depth of about four to six feet (1.2 to 1.8 m). The lake has a contributing watershed of approximately 120,056 acres (486 km^{2}) and watershed:lake ratio on the order of about 50:1. The lake is situated in a glacial till plain and is generally in an area dominated by loamy, poorly drained soils. The area is primarily level but does have some rolling hills.

Okamanpeedan Lake was explored by Joseph Nicollet during his 1838 expedition. He recognized the Sioux name for the lake, which means "nesting place of the herons", because of the large number of herons nesting in tall trees along its shores. Calvin Tuttle was the first settler along the lake, thus that became another name for this body of water.

Okamanpeedan's southwest shore is home to the Tuttle Lake Recreation Area, which includes sixty campsites and a boat launch. Okamanpeedan State Park, maintained by the Iowa Department of Natural Resources, is located on the body's southeast shoreline.

Fish found in Okamanpeedan Lake include walleye, northern pike, crappie, yellow perch, bullhead, catfish and American Grass carp.
