= Raleigh, Iowa =

- Unincorporated community
- Location within Iowa
- Coordinates: 43°20′22″N 94°52′08″W
- Country: United States
- State: Iowa
- County: Emmet
- Elevation: 1,457 ft (444 m)
- Time zone: UTC-6 (Central (CST))
  - Summer (DST): UTC-5 (CDT)
- Area code: 712
- GNIS feature ID: 464711

Raleigh is an unincorporated community in Emmet County, Iowa, United States.

== History ==
Raleigh got its start in the year 1899 as the result of the construction of the Minneapolis & St. Louis railroad through that territory. The population was 10 in 1940.
