= Maple Hill, Iowa =

- Unincorporated community
- Location within Iowa
- Coordinates: 43°23′32″N 94°37′31″W
- Country: United States
- State: Iowa
- County: Emmet
- Elevation: 1,270 ft (390 m)
- Time zone: UTC-6 (Central (CST))
  - Summer (DST): UTC-5 (CDT)
- Area code: 712
- GNIS feature ID: 464641

Maple Hill is an unincorporated community in Emmet County, Iowa, United States.

== History ==
Maple Hill got its start in 1899, following construction of the railroad through that territory. Maple Hill's population was 15 in 1902, and 27 in 1925. The population was 84 in 1940.
