= Estherville, Iowa =

- City
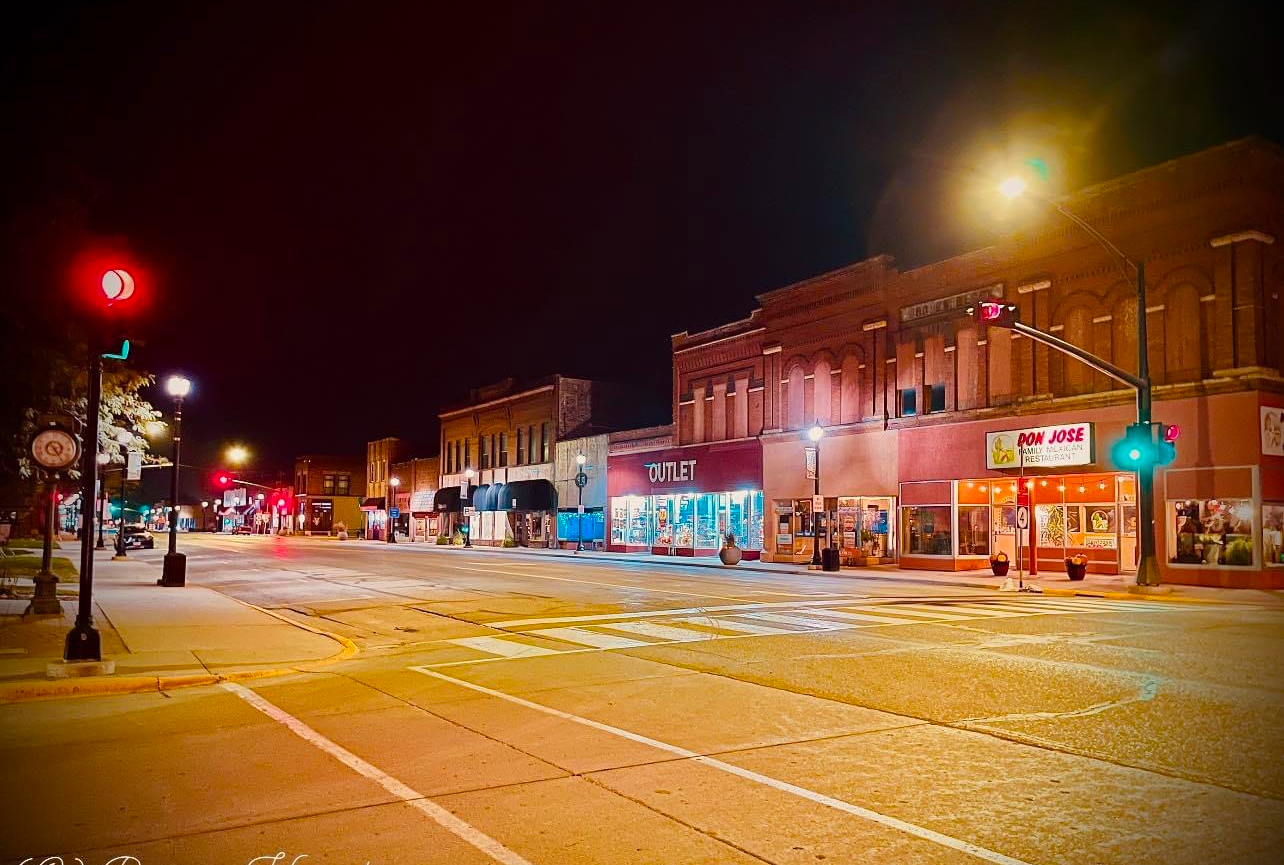
- Central Avenue, Estherville, Iowa

- Logo

- Location of Estherville, Iowa
- Coordinates: 43°24′59″N 94°50′03″W
- Country: United States
- State: Iowa
- County: Emmet
- Township: Estherville
- Incorporated: 1881
- Named for: Esther A. Ridley

Area
  - Total: 5.39 sq mi (13.95 km^{2})
  - Land: 5.39 sq mi (13.95 km^{2})
  - Water: 0 sq mi (0.00 km^{2})
- Elevation: 1,299 ft (396 m)

Population (2020)
  - Total: 5,904
  - Density: 1,096/sq mi (423.2/km^{2})
- Time zone: UTC-6 (Central (CST))
  - Summer (DST): UTC-5 (CDT)
- ZIP code: 51334
- Area code: 712
- FIPS code: 19-25860
- GNIS feature ID: 2394704
- Website: www.cityofestherville.org

Estherville is a city in Estherville Township, Emmet County, Iowa, United States. The population was 5,904 in the 2020 census, a decline from 6,656 at the 2000 census. It is the county seat of Emmet County.

== History ==
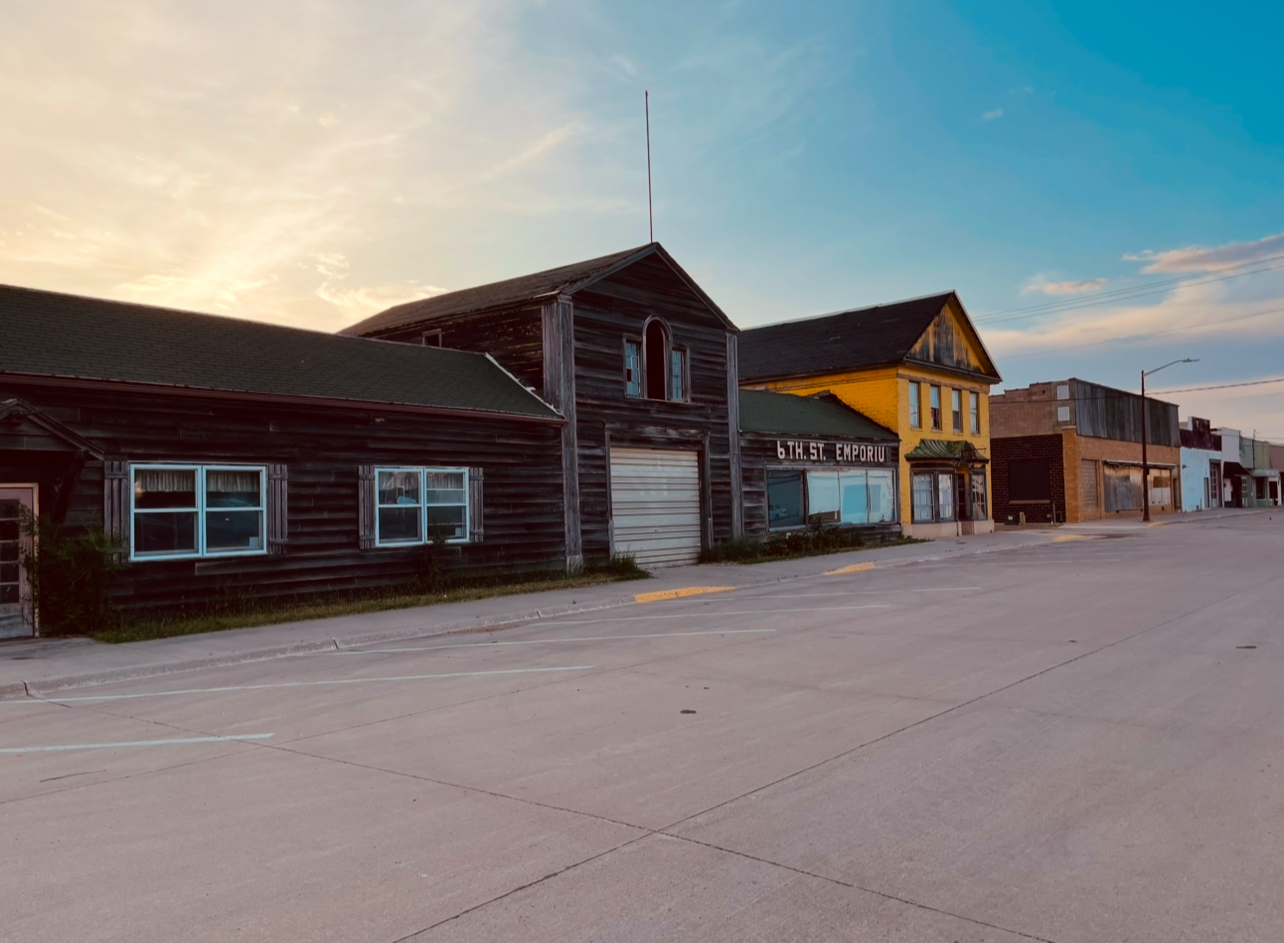
Empty business district - South 6th Street

Emmet County was initially created by an act of the Iowa Legislature in 1851. The area that is now Estherville saw its first settlers arrive around 1856 and into 1857. The city was selected as the county seat in 1859, and was eventually incorporated in 1881.

Estherville was named after Esther A. Ridley, one of the first white female settlers in the area. Many of Estherville's current residents are the descendants of the original Scandinavian, German and Irish immigrants that arrived in the community in the second half of the nineteenth century.

A large meteorite struck the ground near Estherville on May 10, 1879. A report shared with the Royal Astronomical Society (UK) indicated that one fragment weighed about 500 lbs. A smaller fragment was found that weighed 170 lbs. The University of Minnesota acquired several pieces for examination.

== Features and attractions ==
The Regional Wellness Center was a joint project of Estherville Lincoln Central Community School District and the National Guard. Beyond standard gym equipment, the facility boasts an indoor track, pools with slides, and multiple group fitness classes.

Estherville is home to a renovated Carnegie Library. Its services include free public wireless internet.

The intersection of Iowa Highways 4 and 9 features a statue of the Estherville meteorite breaking up in flight.

Fort Defiance State Park offers a variety of hiking and horseback trails, a campsite and outdoor meeting areas. The park was named after a military fort constructed in Estherville in 1863 in response to the Dakota War of 1862.

After the 1862 conflict began, the Iowa Legislature authorized “not less than 500 mounted men from the frontier counties at the earliest possible moment, and to be stationed where most needed”, this number was soon reduced. No fighting took place in Iowa, the Dakota uprising led to the rapid expulsion of the few unassimilated Native Americans left there. Today Fort Defiance State Park covers 191 acres and is governed by the Iowa Department of Natural Resources. The park is home to numerous Whitetail Deer.

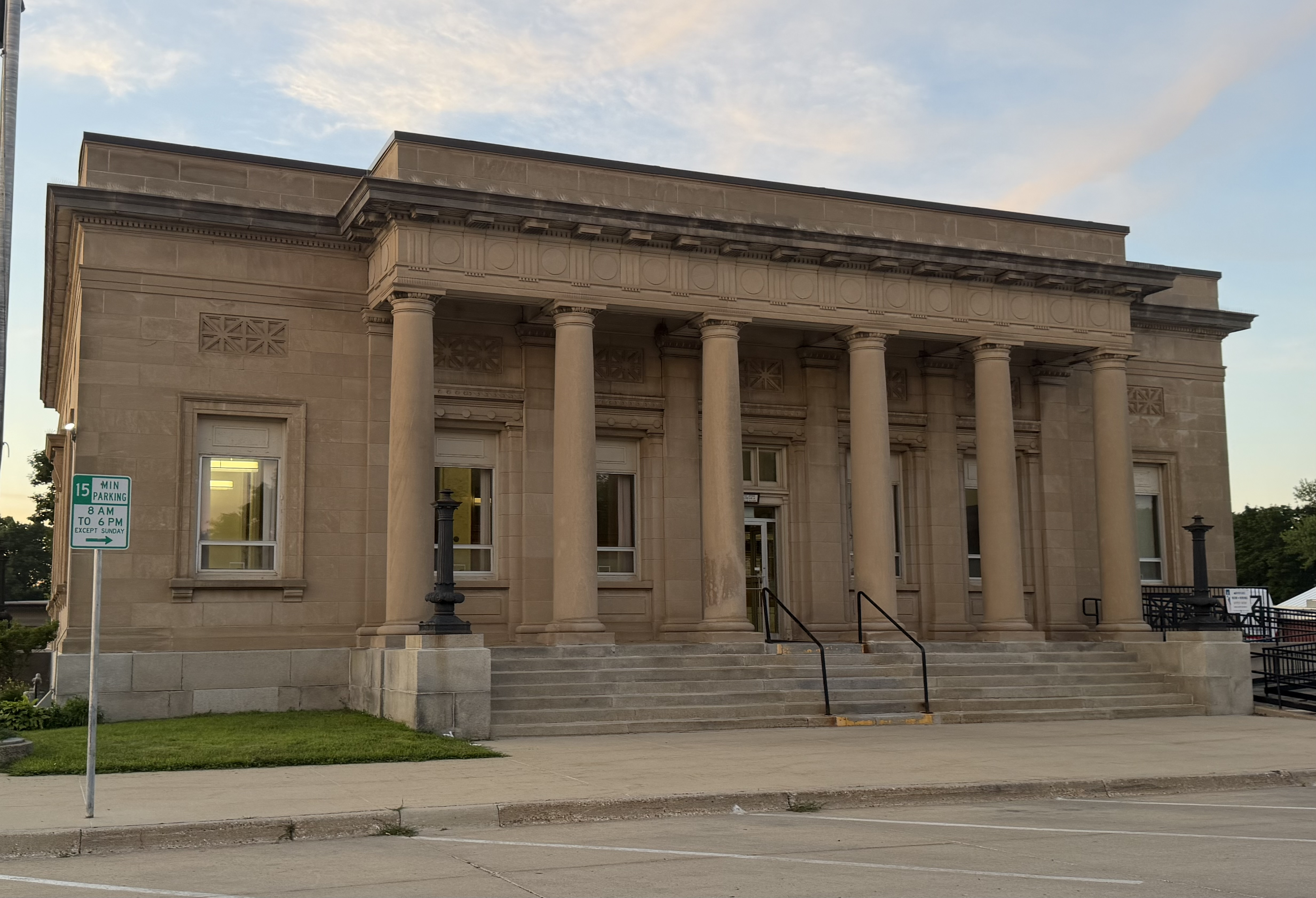
Post Office (Constructed 1910)

== Geography ==
According to the United States Census Bureau, the city has a total area of 5.32 square miles (13.78 km^{2}), all land.

Estherville is near Okoboji and Spirit Lake.

=== Climate ===
According to the Köppen Climate Classification system, Estherville has a hot-summer humid continental climate, abbreviated "Dfa" on climate maps.

Climate data for Estherville, Iowa, 1991–2020 normals, extremes 1893–present
Month	Jan	Feb	Mar	Apr	May	Jun	Jul	Aug	Sep	Oct	Nov	Dec	Year
Record high °F (°C)	66 (19)	69 (21)	88 (31)	93 (34)	107 (42)	106 (41)	108 (42)	107 (42)	101 (38)	93 (34)	80 (27)	70 (21)	108 (42)
Mean maximum °F (°C)	44.1 (6.7)	48.1 (8.9)	67.2 (19.6)	80.8 (27.1)	88.5 (31.4)	91.9 (33.3)	92.7 (33.7)	90.6 (32.6)	88.1 (31.2)	81.7 (27.6)	66.6 (19.2)	47.6 (8.7)	95.2 (35.1)
Mean daily maximum °F (°C)	23.8 (−4.6)	28.4 (−2.0)	41.0 (5.0)	56.6 (13.7)	68.9 (20.5)	79.2 (26.2)	82.5 (28.1)	79.8 (26.6)	73.9 (23.3)	60.2 (15.7)	43.1 (6.2)	29.0 (−1.7)	55.5 (13.1)
Daily mean °F (°C)	14.5 (−9.7)	19.0 (−7.2)	31.5 (−0.3)	44.7 (7.1)	57.4 (14.1)	68.1 (20.1)	71.3 (21.8)	68.5 (20.3)	61.0 (16.1)	48.1 (8.9)	33.0 (0.6)	20.2 (−6.6)	44.8 (7.1)
Mean daily minimum °F (°C)	5.1 (−14.9)	9.6 (−12.4)	21.9 (−5.6)	32.8 (0.4)	45.9 (7.7)	57.0 (13.9)	60.1 (15.6)	57.3 (14.1)	48.2 (9.0)	36.0 (2.2)	23.0 (−5.0)	11.4 (−11.4)	34.0 (1.1)
Mean minimum °F (°C)	−15.6 (−26.4)	−10.3 (−23.5)	0.1 (−17.7)	19.2 (−7.1)	32.7 (0.4)	45.5 (7.5)	50.4 (10.2)	47.1 (8.4)	33.8 (1.0)	20.6 (−6.3)	6.0 (−14.4)	−9.7 (−23.2)	−18.6 (−28.1)
Record low °F (°C)	−31 (−35)	−38 (−39)	−24 (−31)	3 (−16)	18 (−8)	30 (−1)	40 (4)	33 (1)	18 (−8)	−5 (−21)	−12 (−24)	−30 (−34)	−38 (−39)
Average precipitation inches (mm)	0.77 (20)	0.82 (21)	1.42 (36)	3.55 (90)	4.48 (114)	4.80 (122)	3.94 (100)	3.76 (96)	3.25 (83)	2.50 (64)	1.46 (37)	0.99 (25)	31.74 (808)
Average snowfall inches (cm)	8.4 (21)	6.4 (16)	5.7 (14)	2.3 (5.8)	0.0 (0.0)	0.0 (0.0)	0.0 (0.0)	0.0 (0.0)	0.0 (0.0)	0.4 (1.0)	4.3 (11)	6.3 (16)	33.8 (84.8)
Average precipitation days (≥ 0.01 in)	5	4	7	10	11	11	10	8	8	7	5	4	90
Average snowy days (≥ 0.1 in)	4.3	3.7	2.4	1.0	0.0	0.0	0.0	0.0	0.0	0.3	2.0	3.4	17.1
Source 1: NOAA
Source 2: National Weather Service

== Demographics ==
Historical population

Year	Pop.	±%
1870	168	—
1880	138	−17.9%
1890	1,475	+968.8%
1900	3,237	+119.5%
1910	3,404	+5.2%
1920	4,699	+38.0%
1930	4,940	+5.1%
1940	5,651	+14.4%

Year	Pop.	±%
1950	6,719	+18.9%
1960	7,927	+18.0%
1970	8,108	+2.3%
1980	7,518	−7.3%
1990	6,720	−10.6%
2000	6,656	−1.0%
2010	6,360	−4.4%
2020	5,904	−7.2%

Iowa Data Center
U.S. Decennial Census

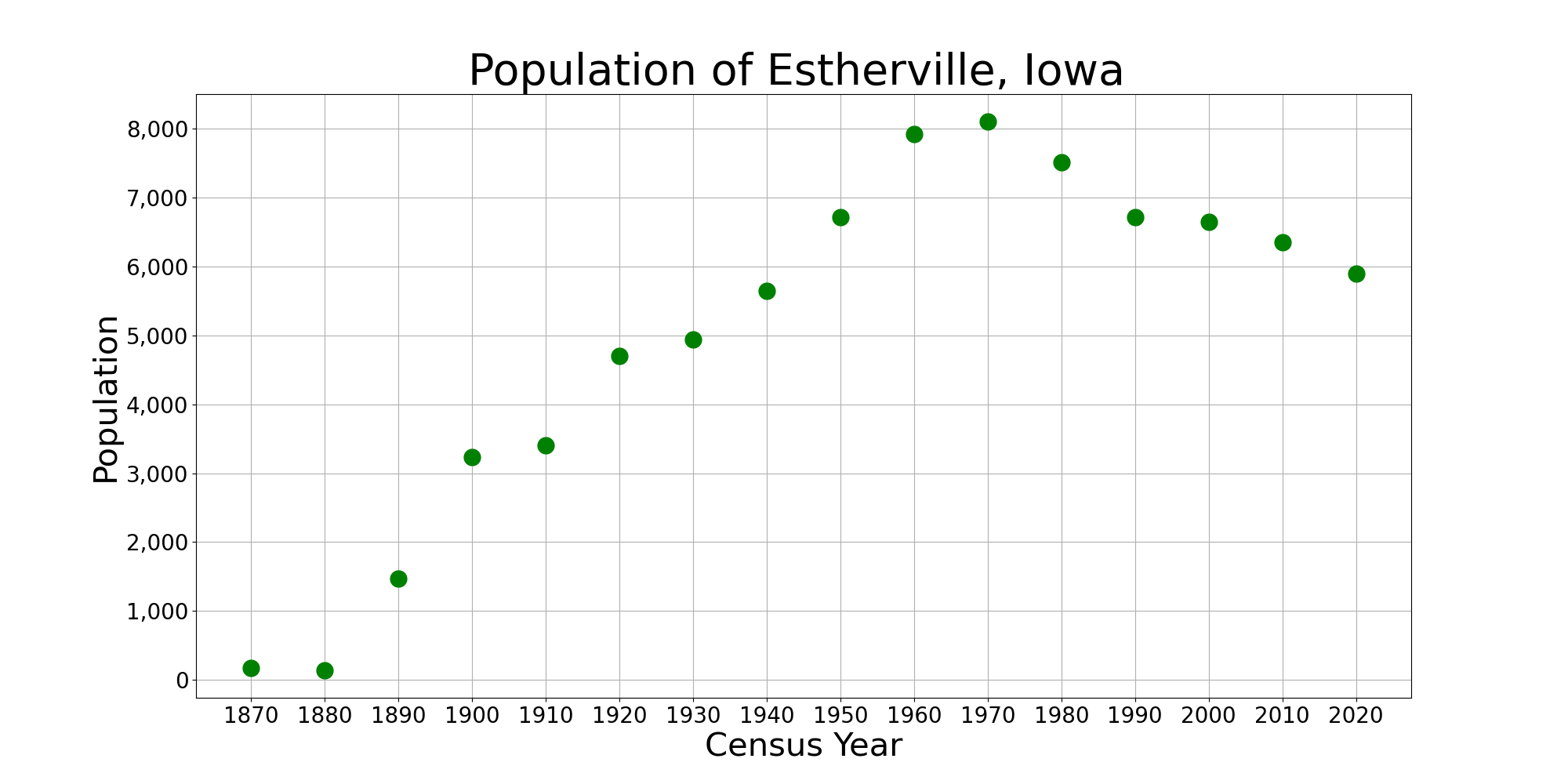
The population of Estherville, Iowa from US census data

=== 2020 census ===
As of the 2020 census, Estherville had a population of 5,904, with 2,455 households and 1,432 families residing in the city. The population density was 1,096.0 inhabitants per square mile (423.2/km^{2}). There were 2,723 housing units at an average density of 505.5 per square mile (195.2/km^{2}).

The median age was 39.3 years. 22.5% of residents were under the age of 18 and 21.0% were age 65 or older. 27.0% of residents were under the age of 20; 7.4% were between the ages of 20 and 24; 21.8% were from 25 to 44; and 22.8% were from 45 to 64. The gender makeup of the city was 50.1% male and 49.9% female. For every 100 females there were 100.5 males, and for every 100 females age 18 and over there were 98.7 males age 18 and over.

97.8% of residents lived in urban areas, while 2.2% lived in rural areas.

Of the 2,455 households, 27.8% had children under the age of 18 living in them. Of all households, 41.5% were married-couple households, 22.1% were households with a male householder and no spouse or partner present, and 28.2% were households with a female householder and no spouse or partner present. Non-family households made up 41.7% of all households. About 35.4% of all households were made up of individuals and 17.6% had someone living alone who was 65 years of age or older.

There were 2,723 housing units, of which 9.8% were vacant. The homeowner vacancy rate was 2.5% and the rental vacancy rate was 13.8%.

Racial composition as of the 2020 census
Race	Number	Percent
White	4,989	84.5%
Black or African American	89	1.5%
American Indian and Alaska Native	42	0.7%
Asian	28	0.5%
Native Hawaiian and Other Pacific Islander	3	0.1%
Some other race	324	5.5%
Two or more races	429	7.3%
Hispanic or Latino (of any race)	809	13.7%

=== 2010 census ===
As of the census of 2010, there were 6,360 people, 2,607 households, and 1,546 families residing in the city. The population density was 1,195.5 inhabitants per square mile (461.6/km^{2}). There were 2,892 housing units at an average density of 543.6 per square mile (209.9/km^{2}). The racial makeup of the city was 90.6% White, 0.8% African American, 0.7% Native American, 0.6% Asian, 5.4% from other races, and 1.9% from two or more races. Hispanic or Latino of any race were 11.0% of the population.

There were 2,607 households, of which 28.8% had children under the age of 18 living with them, 44.1% were married couples living together, 10.1% had a female householder with no husband present, 5.1% had a male householder with no wife present, and 40.7% were non-families. 35.2% of all households were made up of individuals, and 15.4% had someone living alone who was 65 years of age or older. The average household size was 2.29 and the average family size was 2.95.

The median age in the city was 37.2 years. 23.2% of residents were under the age of 18; 12.7% were between the ages of 18 and 24; 22.3% were from 25 to 44; 23.9% were from 45 to 64; and 18% were 65 years of age or older. The gender makeup of the city was 50.3% male and 49.7% female.

=== Income and poverty ===
The median income for a household in the city was $31,279, and the median income for a family was $41,042. Males had a median income of $27,500 versus $20,441 for females. The per capita income for the city was $16,488. About 5.0% of families and 8.1% of the population were below the poverty line, including 9.4% of those under age 18 and 9.3% of those age 65 or over.

== Education ==
Estherville–Lincoln Central Community School District operates area public schools. It was established on July 1, 1997, by the merger of the Estherville and Lincoln Central school districts. The district opened the 2016–17 school year with the elementary, middle, and high schools on a single campus. This is the final stage of a plan which has seen the construction of new elementary and middle school buildings as well as renovation of the high school.

Estherville is home to the main campus of Iowa Lakes Community College.

== Sports ==
Estherville was home to minor league baseball in 1912. The Estherville team won the Championship in the 1912 Iowa State League, an Independent level league. The team was managed by Harry Welch.

== Local media ==
The area is served by the Estherville Daily News, both in print and online. Two local radio stations serve the region, KILR and KILR-FM. Estherville and Emmet County are located in the Sioux City television market.

== Meteorite ==
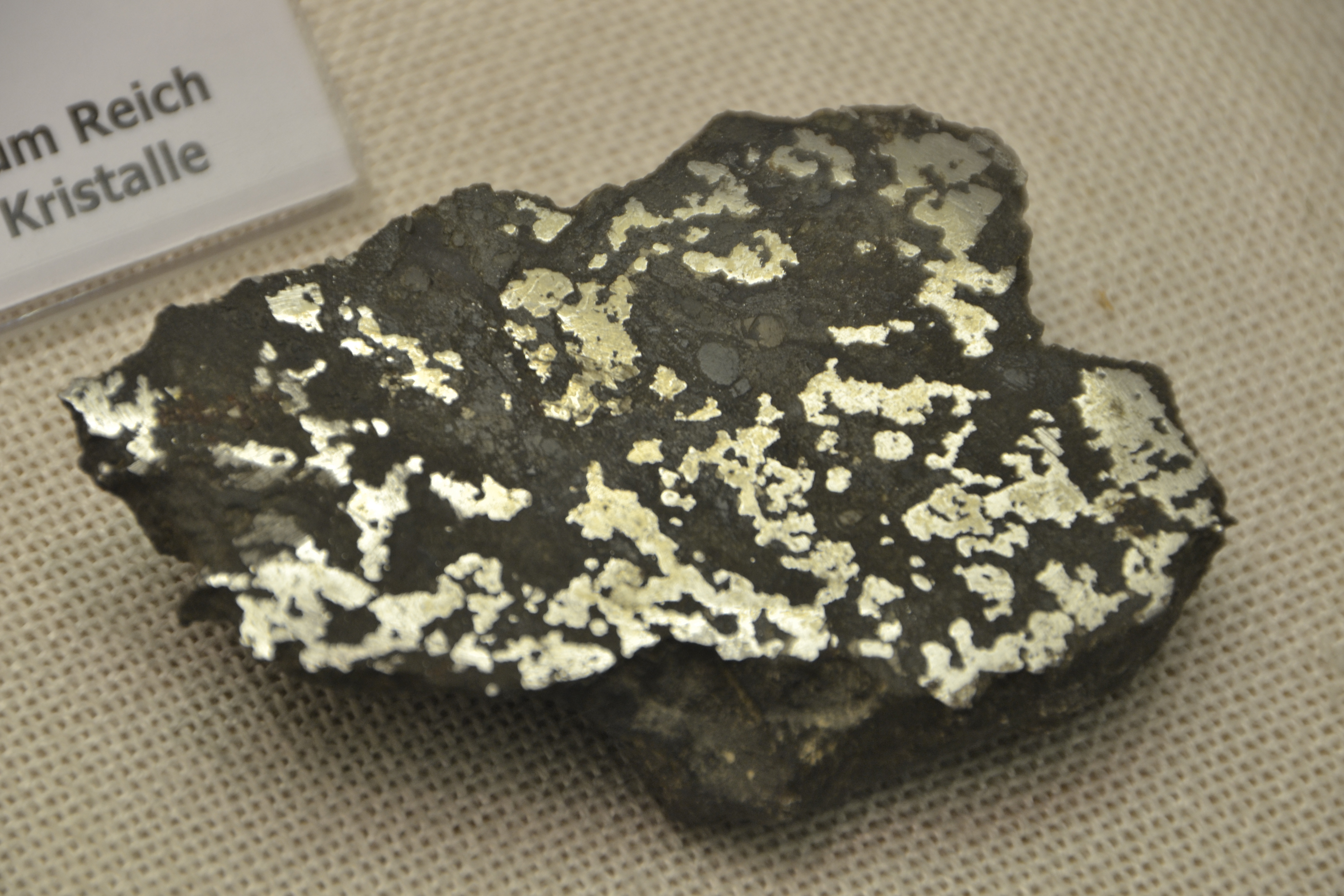
A piece of the stony-iron mesosiderite found near Estherville

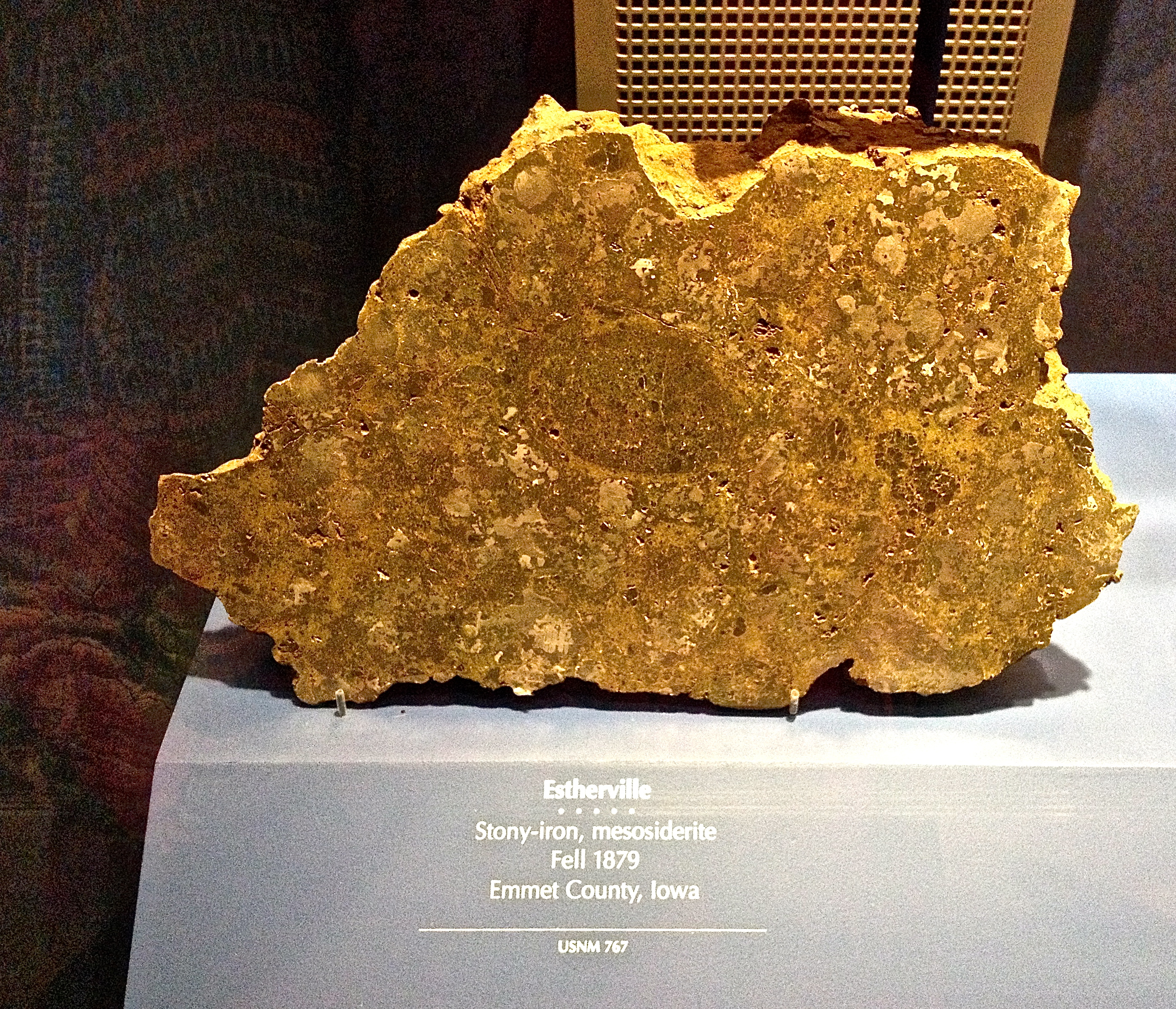
Estherville 1879 meteorite, at the Smithsonian

On May 10, 1879, a 455-pound meteorite fell to earth in Emmet County a few miles north of Estherville, and has become known as the Estherville Meteorite. When it struck it buried itself 15 feet in the ground and required the assistance of a local well digger to retrieve it. It is made of mesosiderite. Portions of the meteorite are on display in the Estherville Public Library, the Smithsonian Museum of Natural History, the Museum Reich der Kristalle in Munich, Germany and the Natural History Museum, Vienna, Austria. The Emmet County Historical Society Museum Complex also has a few much smaller pieces in its collection.

== Notable people ==
- Virgil Frye (1930–2012), American Film Actor, Golden Gloves Champion and father of Sean Frye
- Robert Hansen (1939–2014), Serial killer.
- William M. McFarland (1848–1905), newspaper publisher, served in the Iowa House of Representatives
- Sherie Scheer (born 1940), photographer
- Erika and Benjamin Sifrit, murderers of Joshua Ford and Martha Crutchley.
- Frank P. Woods (1868–1944), five-term U.S. representative
