= Dolliver, Iowa =

- City
- Location of Dolliver, Iowa
- Coordinates: 43°27′49″N 94°36′51″W
- Country: United States
- State: Iowa
- County: Emmet
- Township: Lincoln
- Founded: 1899
- Named for: Jonathan P. Dolliver

Area
  - Total: 0.34 sq mi (0.88 km^{2})
  - Land: 0.34 sq mi (0.88 km^{2})
  - Water: 0 sq mi (0.00 km^{2})
- Elevation: 1,283 ft (391 m)

Population (2020)
  - Total: 65
  - Density: 190.4/sq mi (73.52/km^{2})
- Time zone: UTC-6 (Central (CST))
  - Summer (DST): UTC-5 (CDT)
- ZIP code: 50531
- Area code: 712
- FIPS code: 19-21675
- GNIS feature ID: 2394541

Dolliver is a city in Emmet County, Iowa, United States. The population was 65 at the 2020 census.

== History ==
Dolliver got its start in the year 1899, following the construction of the Chicago and North Western Railway through that territory. It is named for United States Senator Jonathan P. Dolliver. The railroad line on which the town was established was shut down in the early 1970s.

== Geography ==
According to the United States Census Bureau, the city has a total area of 0.36 square miles (0.93 km^{2}), all land.

== Demographics ==
Historical populations
| Year | Pop. | ±% |
|---|---|---|
| 1910 | 107 | — |
| 1920 | 171 | +59.8% |
| 1930 | 158 | −7.6% |
| 1940 | 179 | +13.3% |
| 1950 | 130 | −27.4% |
| 1960 | 122 | −6.2% |
| 1970 | 95 | −22.1% |
| 1980 | 125 | +31.6% |
| 1990 | 103 | −17.6% |
| 2000 | 77 | −25.2% |
| 2010 | 66 | −14.3% |
| 2020 | 65 | −1.5% |
Source:"U.S. Census website". United States Census Bureau. and Iowa Data Center; Source: U.S. Decennial Census

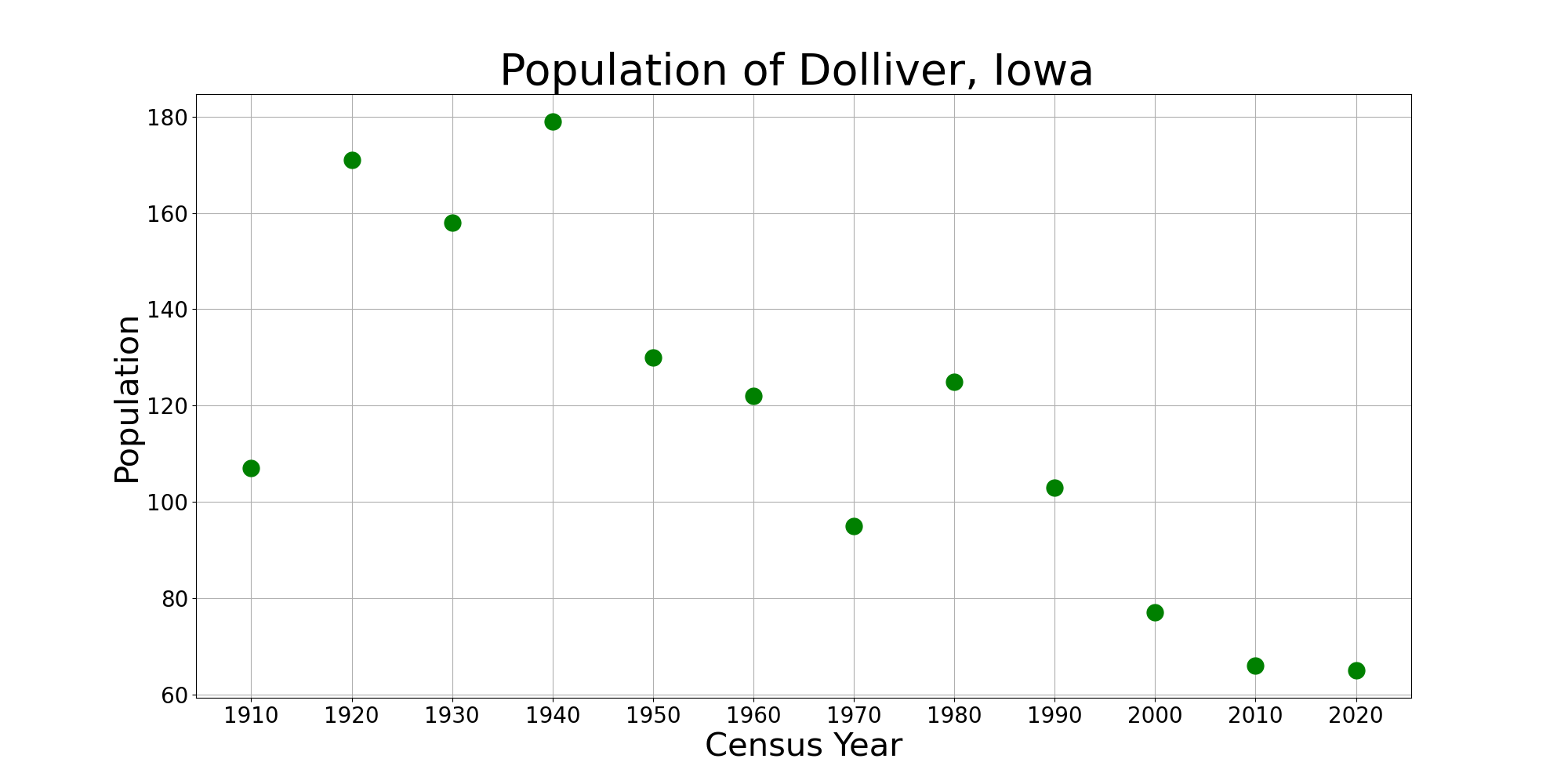
The population of Dolliver, Iowa from US census data

=== 2020 census ===
As of the census of 2020, there were 65 people, 27 households, and 21 families residing in the city. The population density was 190.4 inhabitants per square mile (73.5/km^{2}). There were 33 housing units at an average density of 96.7 per square mile (37.3/km^{2}). The racial makeup of the city was 98.5% White, 0.0% Black or African American, 1.5% Native American, 0.0% Asian, 0.0% Pacific Islander, 0.0% from other races and 0.0% from two or more races. Hispanic or Latino persons of any race comprised 0.0% of the population.

Of the 27 households, 29.6% of which had children under the age of 18 living with them, 55.6% were married couples living together, 7.4% were cohabitating couples, 29.6% had a female householder with no spouse or partner present and 7.4% had a male householder with no spouse or partner present. 22.2% of all households were non-families. 11.1% of all households were made up of individuals, 7.4% had someone living alone who was 65 years old or older.

The median age in the city was 45.3 years. 27.7% of the residents were under the age of 20; 3.1% were between the ages of 20 and 24; 18.5% were from 25 and 44; 29.2% were from 45 and 64; and 21.5% were 65 years of age or older. The gender makeup of the city was 47.7% male and 52.3% female.

=== 2010 census ===
As of the census of 2010, there were 66 people, 34 households, and 18 families living in the city. The population density was 183.3 inhabitants per square mile (70.8/km^{2}). There were 42 housing units at an average density of 116.7 per square mile (45.1/km^{2}). The racial makeup of the city was 100.0% White.

There were 34 households, of which 17.6% had children under the age of 18 living with them, 41.2% were married couples living together, 2.9% had a female householder with no husband present, 8.8% had a male householder with no wife present, and 47.1% were non-families. 35.3% of all households were made up of individuals, and 11.8% had someone living alone who was 65 years of age or older. The average household size was 1.94 and the average family size was 2.44.

The median age in the city was 52 years. 12.1% of residents were under the age of 18; 3.1% were between the ages of 18 and 24; 21.3% were from 25 to 44; 35% were from 45 to 64; and 28.8% were 65 years of age or older. The gender makeup of the city was 53.0% male and 47.0% female.

=== 2000 census ===
As of the census of 2000, there were 77 people, 38 households, and 19 families living in the city. The population density was 210.9 inhabitants per square mile (81.4/km^{2}). There were 46 housing units at an average density of 126.0 per square mile (48.6/km^{2}). The racial makeup of the city was 98.70% White and 1.30% Asian. Hispanic or Latino of any race were 3.90% of the population.

There were 38 households, out of which 10.5% had children under the age of 18 living with them, 50.0% were married couples living together, and 47.4% were non-families. 39.5% of all households were made up of individuals, and 28.9% had someone living alone who was 65 years of age or older. The average household size was 2.03 and the average family size was 2.70.

In the city, the population was spread out, with 13.0% under the age of 18, 7.8% from 18 to 24, 24.7% from 25 to 44, 29.9% from 45 to 64, and 24.7% who were 65 years of age or older. The median age was 48 years. For every 100 females, there were 102.6 males. For every 100 females age 18 and over, there were 91.4 males.

The median income for a household in the city was $28,036, and the median income for a family was $34,375. Males had a median income of $28,750 versus $21,944 for females. The per capita income for the city was $18,387. None of the population and none of the families were below the poverty line.

== Education ==
Estherville–Lincoln Central Community School District operates area public schools. It was established on July 1, 1997, by the merger of the Estherville and Lincoln Central school districts.
