= KILR-FM =

- Estherville, Iowa; United States
- Frequency: 95.9 MHz
- Branding: Killer Bee Country

Programming
- Format: Country
- Affiliations: Townhall News

Ownership
- Owner: Matt and Jessica Beaver; (Beaver Broadcasting, inc.)
- Sister stations: KILR (AM)

History
- First air date: October 1969
- Call sign meaning: KILleR Bee Country

Technical information
- Licensing authority: FCC
- Facility ID: 29725
- Class: C3
- ERP: 25,000 watts
- HAAT: 99 m (325 ft)
- Transmitter coordinates: 43°25′45″N 94°49′23″W

Links
- Public license information: Public file; LMS
- Webcast: Listen Live
- Website: kilrradio.com

KILR-FM (95.9 MHz) is a commercial radio station serving the Estherville, Iowa area, as well as the Iowa Great Lakes region. The station broadcasts a country format. KILR-FM is licensed to Beaver Broadcasting, Inc., which is owned by Matt and Jessica Beaver.

They also own sister station KILR. The AM-FM studios, transmitter and tower are located northeast of Estherville along Iowa Highway 4. The station first signed on in October 1969 with 3,000 watts.

According to the Antenna Structure Registration database, the tower is 108.8 m (357 ft) tall with the FM broadcast antenna mounted at the 102 m (335 ft) level. The calculated Height Above Average Terrain is 99 m (325 ft). In 2007, the FCC issued Jacobson a construction permit allowing a power increase to 50,000 watts, along with increasing the HAAT to 150 m (492 ft). A new transmitter site was to be located about 10 miles southwest of Estherville. As of January 2017, that facility change never took place. According to records, it's still out on Highway 4.
