= KILR (AM) =

- Estherville, Iowa; United States
- Frequency: 1070 kHz

Programming
- Format: News/Talk
- Affiliations: Premiere Networks; Salem Radio Network; Townhall

Ownership
- Owner: Matt and Jessica Beaver; (Beaver Broadcasting, Inc.)
- Sister stations: KILR-FM

History
- First air date: December 1967

Technical information
- Licensing authority: FCC
- Facility ID: 29726
- Class: D
- Power: 250 watts day 48 watts night
- Transmitter coordinates: 43°25′45″N 94°49′23″W
- Translator: (97.3 MHz) K247CJ (Estherville)

Links
- Public license information: Public file; LMS
- Webcast: Listen Live
- Website: KILR AM-FM

KILR (1070 kHz) is a commercial AM radio station serving the Estherville, Iowa area as well as the Iowa Great Lakes region. The station primarily broadcasts a talk radio format. KILR is licensed to Beaver Broadcasting, Inc., which also owns sister station KILR-FM. The AM-FM studios, transmitter and towers are located northeast of Estherville along Iowa Highway 4.

== History ==
The station first signed on in December 1967 as a daytimer with 250 watts.

=== Expanded band assignment ===
On March 17, 1997, the Federal Communications Commission (FCC) announced that eighty-eight stations had been given permission to move to newly available "Expanded Band" transmitting frequencies, ranging from 1610 to 1700 kHz, with KILR authorized to move from 1070 to 1690 kHz. However, the station never procured the Construction Permit needed to implement the authorization, so the expanded band station was never built
