= Fort Defiance State Park =

State park in Emmet County, Iowa

- Location within Iowa Location within the United States
- Location: Emmet County, Iowa, United States
- Coordinates: 43°23′31″N 94°51′37″W
- Area: 191 acres (77 ha)
- Elevation: 1,453 ft (443 m)
- Established: 1930
- Administrator: Iowa Department of Natural Resources
- Website: Official website

Fort Defiance State Park is a 191-acre (77 ha) public recreation area in Emmet County, Iowa, United States. The state park was built by the Civilian Conservation Corps during the Great Depression and opened to the public in 1930. Fort Defiance State Park is open for year-round recreation including picnicking, hiking, and camping.

== History ==
Fort Defiance State Park is named for the former Fort Defiance which stood where an accounting office is now located at 103 S. Sixth St. in Estherville, Iowa. The fort was built to protect a gristmill and sawmill during the Dakota War of 1862. In Iowa alarm over the attacks in Minnesota and the Dakotas led to the construction of a series of forts from Sioux City to Iowa Lake. The region had previously been militarized in the aftermath of the Spirit Lake Massacre in 1857. After the 1862 conflict began, the Iowa Legislature authorized “not less than 500 mounted men from the frontier counties at the earliest possible moment, and to be stationed where most needed”, this number was soon reduced. No fighting took place in Iowa, the Dakota uprising led to the rapid expulsion of the few unassimilated Native Americans left there. Fort Defiance was built in 1862 at a time when 40% of the male population of Emmet County was away and fighting for the Union Army during the American Civil War.

== Recreation ==
Fort Defiance State Park is open for year-round recreation. A lodge built to resemble a frontier army outpost is available to rent to large groups for meetings and reunions. There is a picnic pavilion that is open to all visitors on a first-come first-served basis. The park has a rustic camping area with sixteen camping sites. There are no flush toilets or showers available and just eight of the campsites are connected to electricity. The trails of the park are open to hiking, horseback riding and cross-country skiing. Two of the trails, White Tail Ridge Trail and Spring Trail have undergone extensive improvements. The work, completed by students from the Iowa Lakes Community College environmental studies program, included covering the trails with wood chips to make the trails "more hiker friendly." White Tail Ridge Trail passes through a wooded area where visitors may encounter some White-tail deer. The Spring Trails passes through a patch of prairie.

== Friends of Fort Defiance State Park ==
The Friends of Fort Defiance State Park is a community organization founded in 2006 to improve the park. The group has raised funds for trail construction and maintenance and worked to keep the grounds of the park clean. Additionally the friends worked to improve the electric hookups at the campsites from 20 amps to 50 amps. Park use and visitation has increased since the Friends of Fort Defiance State Park began their campaign to improve the park. A local newspaper describes the level of use of the campground as being "constant" and has noted an increase in rentals of the lodge for large group functions.
