= Gridley, Iowa =

- Unincorporated community
- Location within Iowa
- Coordinates: 43°23′58″N 94°34′24″W
- Country: United States
- State: Iowa
- County: Emmet
- Elevation: 1,273 ft (388 m)
- Time zone: UTC-6 (Central (CST))
  - Summer (DST): UTC-5 (CDT)
- Area code: 712
- GNIS feature ID: 464037

Gridley is an unincorporated community in Emmet County, Iowa, United States.

== History ==
Gridley was platted in 1899 when the Chicago & Northwestern railroad was extended to that point. The railroad company named the town after Ashel Gridley, an Illinois banker. A post office was established in Gridley in 1900, and remained in operation until being discontinued in 1910.

Gridley's population was 27 in 1925. The population was 10 in 1940.
