= Halfa, Iowa =

- Unincorporated community
- Location within Iowa
- Coordinates: 43°21′07″N 94°32′31″W
- Country: United States
- State: Iowa
- County: Emmet
- Elevation: 1,273 ft (388 m)
- Time zone: UTC-6 (Central (CST))
  - Summer (DST): UTC-5 (CDT)
- Area code: 712
- GNIS feature ID: 457204

Halfa is an unincorporated community in Emmet County, Iowa, United States.

== History ==
Halfa was platted in 1899. It was named after Wadi Halfa, Sudan. A post office was established in Halfa in 1900, and remained in operation until it was discontinued in 1932.

Halfa's population was 52 in 1925. The population was 40 in 1940.
