= Huntington, Iowa =

- Unincorporated community
- Location within Iowa
- Coordinates: 43°29′30″N 94°47′31″W
- Country: United States
- State: Iowa
- County: Emmet
- Elevation: 1,342 ft (409 m)
- Time zone: UTC-6 (Central (CST))
  - Summer (DST): UTC-5 (CDT)
- Area code: 712
- GNIS feature ID: 457730

Huntington is an unincorporated community in Emmet County, Iowa, United States.

== History ==
Huntington got its start in 1899, following the construction of the Minneapolis & St. Louis railroad through that territory. The population was 35 in 1940.
