= Gruver, Iowa =

- City
- Location of Gruver, Iowa
- Coordinates: 43°23′35″N 94°42′13″W
- Country: United States
- State: Iowa
- County: Emmet
- Township: Center

Area
  - Total: 0.13 sq mi (0.33 km^{2})
  - Land: 0.13 sq mi (0.33 km^{2})
  - Water: 0 sq mi (0.00 km^{2})
- Elevation: 1,303 ft (397 m)

Population (2020)
  - Total: 63
  - Density: 497.8/sq mi (192.22/km^{2})
- Time zone: UTC-6 (Central (CST))
  - Summer (DST): UTC-5 (CDT)
- ZIP code: 51344
- Area code: 712
- FIPS code: 19-33240
- GNIS feature ID: 2394257

Gruver is a city in Center Township, Emmet County, Iowa, United States. The population was 63 at the time of the 2020 census.

== History ==
Gruver was laid out in 1899. The town was called Luzon until 1900, when it the name was changed to Gruver.

== Geography ==
According to the United States Census Bureau, the city has a total area of 0.13 square miles (0.34 km^{2}), all land.

== Demographics ==
Historical populations
Year	Pop.	±%
1920	118	—
1930	126	+6.8%
1940	138	+9.5%
1950	135	−2.2%
1960	140	+3.7%
1970	135	−3.6%
1980	145	+7.4%
1990	102	−29.7%
2000	106	+3.9%
2010	94	−11.3%
2020	63	−33.0%
Source:"U.S. Census website". United States Census Bureau. and Iowa Data Center; Source: U.S. Decennial Census

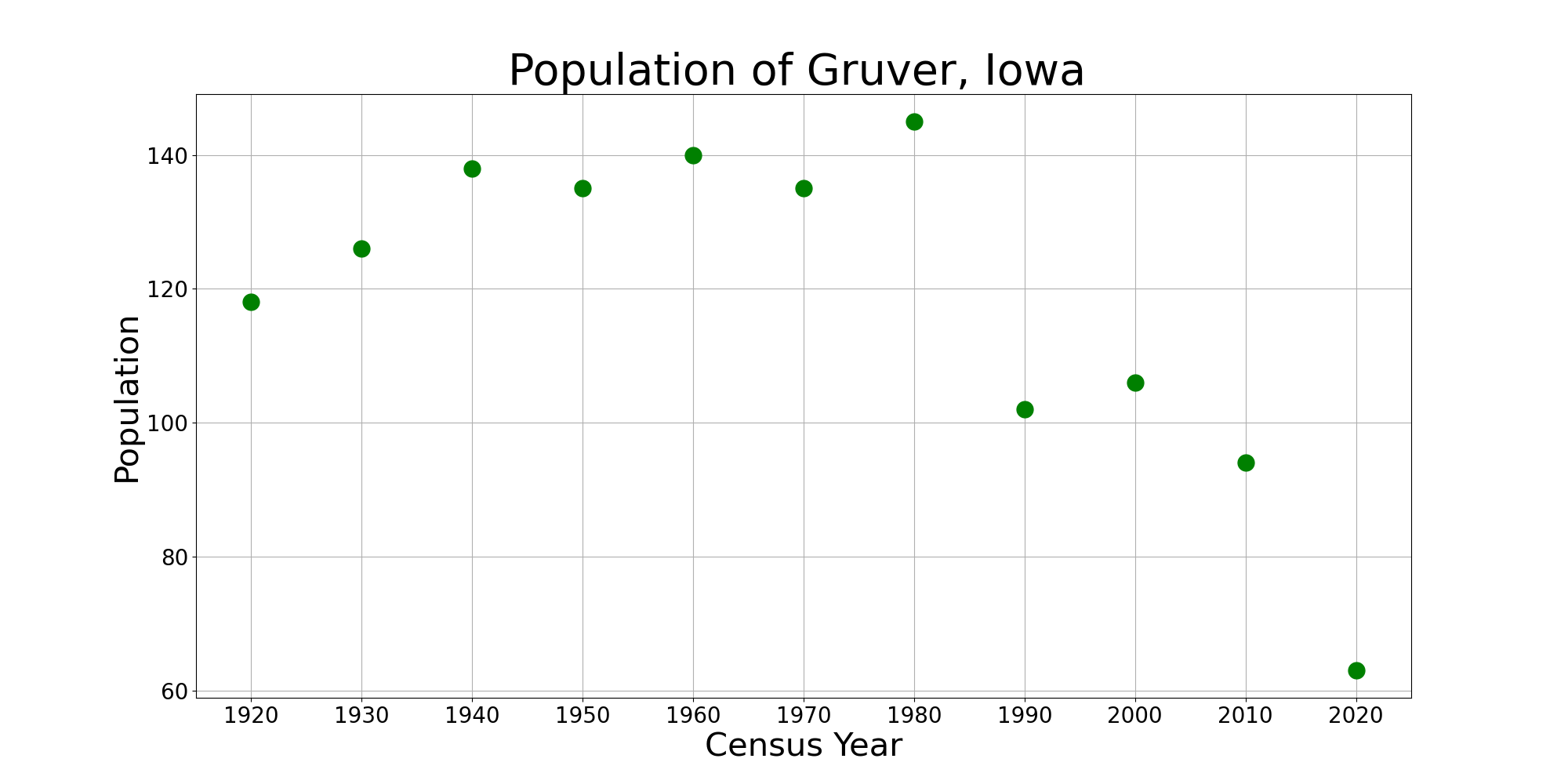
The population of Gruver, Iowa from US census data

=== 2020 census ===
As of the census of 2020, there were 63 people, 29 households, and 21 families residing in the city. The population density was 497.8 inhabitants per square mile (192.2/km^{2}). There were 32 housing units at an average density of 252.9 per square mile (97.6/km^{2}). The racial makeup of the city was 100.0% White, 0.0% Black or African American, 0.0% Native American, 0.0% Asian, 0.0% Pacific Islander, 0.0% from other races and 0.0% from two or more races. Hispanic or Latino persons of any race comprised 0.0% of the population.

Of the 29 households, 37.9% of which had children under the age of 18 living with them, 41.4% were married couples living together, 3.4% were cohabitating couples, 37.9% had a female householder with no spouse or partner present and 17.2% had a male householder with no spouse or partner present. 27.6% of all households were non-families. 20.7% of all households were made up of individuals, 10.3% had someone living alone who was 65 years old or older.

The median age in the city was 55.5 years. 19.0% of the residents were under the age of 20; 1.6% were between the ages of 20 and 24; 20.6% were from 25 and 44; 28.6% were from 45 and 64; and 30.2% were 65 years of age or older. The gender makeup of the city was 55.6% male and 44.4% female.

=== 2010 census ===
As of the census of 2010, there were 94 people, 38 households, and 24 families living in the city. The population density was 723.1 inhabitants per square mile (279.2/km^{2}). There were 40 housing units at an average density of 307.7 per square mile (118.8/km^{2}). The racial makeup of the city was 97.9% White and 2.1% African American. Hispanic or Latino of any race were 1.1% of the population.

There were 38 households, of which 31.6% had children under the age of 18 living with them, 50.0% were married couples living together, 5.3% had a female householder with no husband present, 7.9% had a male householder with no wife present, and 36.8% were non-families. 31.6% of all households were made up of individuals, and 21.1% had someone living alone who was 65 years of age or older. The average household size was 2.34 and the average family size was 3.00.

The median age in the city was 32.5 years. 28.7% of residents were under the age of 18; 11.6% were between the ages of 18 and 24; 17% were from 25 to 44; 27.6% were from 45 to 64; and 14.9% were 65 years of age or older. The gender makeup of the city was 55.3% male and 44.7% female.

=== 2000 census ===
As of the census of 2000, there were 106 people, 42 households, and 33 families living in the city. The population density was 830.1 inhabitants per square mile (320.5/km^{2}). There were 44 housing units at an average density of 344.6 per square mile (133.1/km^{2}). The racial makeup of the city was 100.00% White. Hispanic or Latino of any race were 2.83% of the population.

There were 42 households, out of which 28.6% had children under the age of 18 living with them, 69.0% were married couples living together, 7.1% had a female householder with no husband present, and 21.4% were non-families. 14.3% of all households were made up of individuals, and 7.1% had someone living alone who was 65 years of age or older. The average household size was 2.52 and the average family size was 2.76.

In the city, the population was spread out, with 21.7% under the age of 18, 9.4% from 18 to 24, 24.5% from 25 to 44, 29.2% from 45 to 64, and 15.1% who were 65 years of age or older. The median age was 38 years. For every 100 females, there were 100.0 males. For every 100 females age 18 and over, there were 97.6 males.

The median income for a household in the city was $38,125, and the median income for a family was $37,813. Males had a median income of $33,125 versus $23,750 for females. The per capita income for the city was $17,766. There were no families and 2.7% of the population living below the poverty line, including no under eighteens and 16.7% of those over 64.

== Education ==
Estherville–Lincoln Central Community School District operates area public schools. It was established on July 1, 1997, by the merger of the Estherville and Lincoln Central school districts.
