= Emmet County, Iowa =

County in Iowa, United States

- County
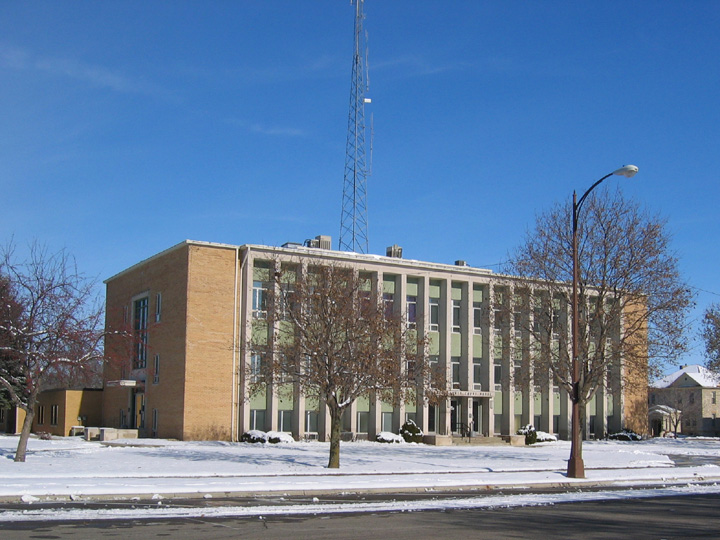
- The Emmet County Courthouse in Estherville

- Location within the U.S. state of Iowa
- Coordinates: 43°22′38″N 94°40′39″W
- Country: United States
- State: Iowa
- Created: January 15, 1851
- Organized: February 7, 1859
- Named for: Robert Emmet
- Seat: Estherville
- Largest city: Estherville

Area
  - Total: 402.522 sq mi (1,042.53 km^{2})
  - Land: 395.890 sq mi (1,025.35 km^{2})
  - Water: 6.632 sq mi (17.18 km^{2}) 1.65%

Population (2020)
  - Total: 9,388
  - Estimate (2025): 9,107 ▼
  - Density: 23.71/sq mi (9.156/km^{2})
- Time zone: UTC−6 (Central)
  - Summer (DST): UTC−5 (CDT)
- Congressional district: 4th
- Website: emmetcountyia.gov
- Iowa county number 32

Emmet County is a county located in the U.S. state of Iowa. As of the 2020 census, the population was 9,388. The county seat and the largest city is Estherville.

== History ==
Emmet County was created by authority of the Iowa Legislature in 1851. Enough settlers had been established in the area to organize the county in 1859. The county was named for the Irish patriot Robert Emmet, who was hanged as a traitor to the British government at the age of 25.

== Geography ==
According to the United States Census Bureau, the county has a total area of 402.522 square miles (1,042.53 km^{2}), of which 395.890 square miles (1,025.35 km^{2}) is land and 6.632 square miles (17.18 km^{2}) (1.65%) is water. It is the 98th largest county in Iowa by total area.

It is the second-smallest county by land area in Iowa, and the fourth-smallest by total area.

=== Major highways ===
- Iowa Highway 4
- Iowa Highway 9
- Iowa Highway 15

=== Adjacent counties ===
- Jackson County, Minnesota (northwest)
- Martin County, Minnesota (northeast)
- Kossuth County (east)
- Palo Alto County (south)
- Dickinson County (west)

== Demographics ==
Historical population
Census	Pop.	Note	%±
1860	105		—
1870	1,392		1,225.7%
1880	1,550		11.4%
1890	4,274		175.7%
1900	9,936		132.5%
1910	9,816		−1.2%
1920	12,627		28.6%
1930	12,856		1.8%
1940	13,406		4.3%
1950	14,102		5.2%
1960	14,871		5.5%
1970	14,009		−5.8%
1980	13,336		−4.8%
1990	11,569		−13.2%
2000	11,027		−4.7%
2010	10,302		−6.6%
2020	9,388		−8.9%
2025 (est.)	9,107	▼	−3.0%
U.S. Decennial Census; 1790–1960 1900–1990; 1990–2000 2010–2020

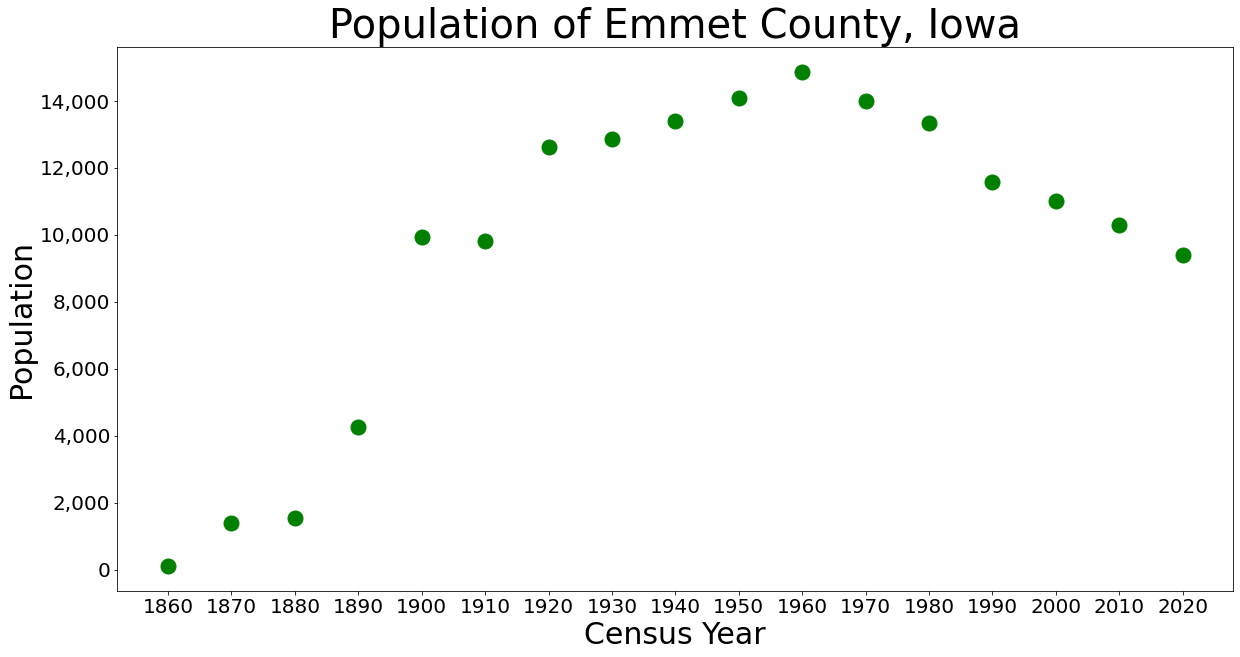
Population of Emmet County from US census data

=== 2020 census ===
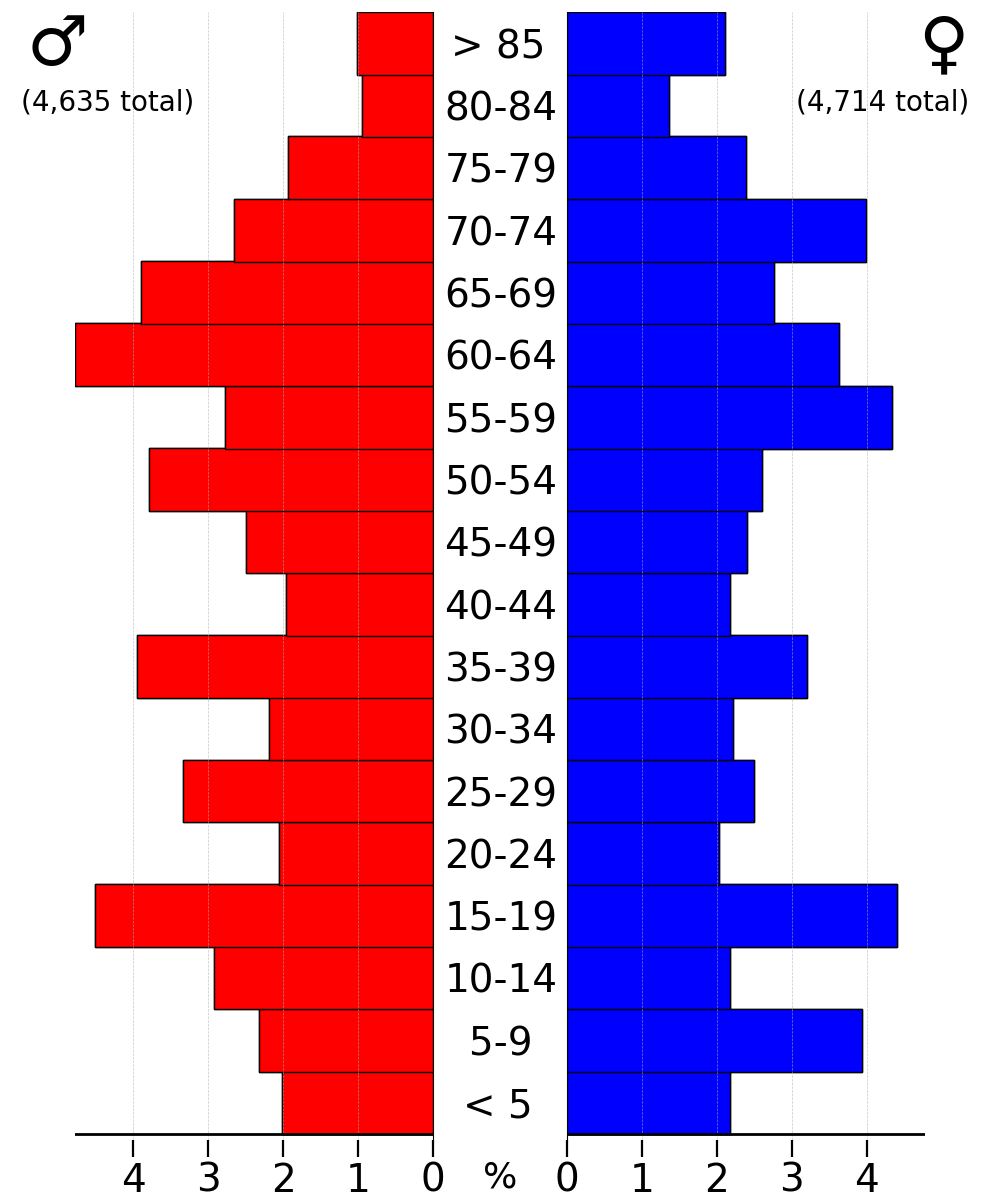
2022 US Census population pyramid for Emmet County from ACS 5-year estimates

As of the 2020 census, the county had a population of 9,388 and a population density of 22.9/sq mi (8.9/km^{2}).

The median age was 43.1 years. 21.9% of residents were under the age of 18 and 23.3% of residents were 65 years of age or older. For every 100 females there were 102.5 males, and for every 100 females age 18 and over there were 100.2 males age 18 and over.

There were 3,972 households in the county, of which 26.6% had children under the age of 18 living in them. Of all households, 46.9% were married-couple households, 21.0% were households with a male householder and no spouse or partner present, and 24.7% were households with a female householder and no spouse or partner present. About 33.0% of all households were made up of individuals and 16.9% had someone living alone who was 65 years of age or older.

There were 4,475 housing units, of which 3,972 were occupied and 11.2% were vacant. Among occupied housing units, 77.9% were owner-occupied and 22.1% were renter-occupied. The homeowner vacancy rate was 2.2% and the rental vacancy rate was 12.5%.

61.5% of residents lived in urban areas, while 38.5% lived in rural areas.

The racial makeup of the county was 89.0% White, 1.0% Black or African American, 0.6% American Indian and Alaska Native, 0.3% Asian, <0.1% Native Hawaiian and Pacific Islander, 3.9% from some other race, and 5.2% from two or more races. 94.84% of the population reported being of one race. Hispanic or Latino residents of any race comprised 9.4% of the population.

Emmet County Racial Composition
Race	Number	Percent
White (NH)	8,134	86.64%
Black or African American (NH)	89	0.94%
Native American (NH)	31	0.33%
Asian (NH)	32	0.34%
Pacific Islander (NH)	3	0.03%
Other/Mixed (NH)	212	2.3%
Hispanic or Latino	887	9.5%

=== 2010 census ===
The 2010 census recorded a population of 10,302 in the county, with a population density of 26.0/sq mi (10.1/km^{2}). There were 4,758 housing units, of which 4,236 were occupied.

=== 2000 census ===
As of the census of 2000, there were 11,027 people, 4,450 households, and 2,910 families residing in the county. The population density was 28 people per square mile (11 people/km^{2}). There were 4,889 housing units at an average density of 12 units per square mile (4.6 units/km^{2}). The racial makeup of the county was 97.38% White, 0.24% Black or African American, 0.28% Native American, 0.30% Asian, 0.01% Pacific Islander, 1.25% from other races, and 0.54% from two or more races. 4.31% of the population were Hispanic or Latino of any race.

There were 4,450 households, out of which 27.90% had children under the age of 18 living with them, 55.00% were married couples living together, 7.80% had a female householder with no husband present, and 34.60% were non-families. 30.30% of all households were made up of individuals, and 15.30% had someone living alone who was 65 years of age or older. The average household size was 2.36 and the average family size was 2.93.

In the county, the population was spread out, with 24.20% under the age of 18, 10.10% from 18 to 24, 23.80% from 25 to 44, 22.50% from 45 to 64, and 19.40% who were 65 years of age or older. The median age was 40 years. For every 100 females there were 94.40 males. For every 100 females age 18 and over, there were 93.30 males.

The median income for a household in the county was $33,305, and the median income for a family was $41,296. Males had a median income of $27,495 versus $20,278 for females. The per capita income for the county was $16,619. About 5.20% of families and 8.20% of the population were below the poverty line, including 9.40% of those under age 18 and 9.10% of those age 65 or over.

== Communities ==
=== Cities ===
- Armstrong
- Dolliver
- Estherville
- Gruver
- Ringsted
- Wallingford

=== Unincorporated communities ===
- Forsyth
- Gridley
- Halfa
- Hoprig
- Huntington
- Maple Hill
- Raleigh

=== Townships ===
Emmet County is divided into twelve townships:

- Armstrong Grove
- Center
- Denmark
- Ellsworth
- Emmet
- Estherville
- High Lake
- Iowa Lake
- Jack Creek
- Lincoln
- Swan Lake
- Twelve Mile Lake

=== Population ranking ===
The population ranking of the following table is based on the 2020 census of Emmet County. † county seat

Rank	City/Town/etc.	Municipal type	Population (2020 Census)
1	† Estherville	City	5,904
2	Armstrong	City	875
3	Ringsted	City	365
4	Wallingford	City	165
5	Dolliver	City	65
6	Gruver	City	63

== Politics ==
United States presidential election results for Emmet County, Iowa
Year	Republican		Democratic		Third party(ies)	
Year	No.	%	No.	%	No.	%
1896	1,429	70.05%	559	27.40%	52	2.55%
1900	1,618	70.59%	595	25.96%	79	3.45%
1904	1,732	80.15%	358	16.57%	71	3.29%
1908	1,401	70.58%	522	26.30%	62	3.12%
1912	602	30.98%	486	25.01%	855	44.00%
1916	1,409	62.37%	809	35.81%	41	1.81%
1920	3,360	76.00%	991	22.42%	70	1.58%
1924	2,739	53.26%	407	7.91%	1,997	38.83%
1928	3,218	70.11%	1,372	29.89%	0	0.00%
1932	2,129	45.21%	2,486	52.79%	94	2.00%
1936	2,362	41.84%	3,158	55.94%	125	2.21%
1940	3,053	49.27%	3,097	49.98%	47	0.76%
1944	2,668	50.47%	2,577	48.75%	41	0.78%
1948	2,464	46.38%	2,752	51.80%	97	1.83%
1952	4,935	71.48%	1,947	28.20%	22	0.32%
1956	4,193	63.68%	2,386	36.24%	5	0.08%
1960	4,284	62.51%	2,563	37.40%	6	0.09%
1964	2,611	42.78%	3,487	57.14%	5	0.08%
1968	3,444	58.90%	2,163	36.99%	240	4.10%
1972	3,436	62.92%	1,970	36.07%	55	1.01%
1976	2,872	50.50%	2,720	47.83%	95	1.67%
1980	3,062	53.49%	2,153	37.61%	509	8.89%
1984	2,946	51.46%	2,746	47.97%	33	0.58%
1988	2,173	43.66%	2,778	55.82%	26	0.52%
1992	1,749	34.76%	2,239	44.50%	1,044	20.75%
1996	1,641	37.20%	2,270	51.46%	500	11.34%
2000	2,331	50.35%	2,165	46.76%	134	2.89%
2004	2,697	52.31%	2,405	46.64%	54	1.05%
2008	2,373	47.32%	2,570	51.25%	72	1.44%
2012	2,507	53.49%	2,099	44.78%	81	1.73%
2016	3,124	65.73%	1,357	28.55%	272	5.72%
2020	3,265	67.28%	1,520	31.32%	68	1.40%
2024	3,422	71.32%	1,315	27.41%	61	1.27%

== Education ==
School districts include:

- Estherville–Lincoln Central Community School District
- North Union Community School District (partially extends into Kossuth and Palo Alto counties)

== See also ==
- National Register of Historic Places listings in Emmet County, Iowa
