= Lost Island Township, Palo Alto County, Iowa =

Township in Palo Alto County, Iowa, U.S.

Coordinates: 43°13′N 94°30′W

Lost Island Township is a township in Palo Alto County, Iowa, USA.
