= Estherville–Lincoln Central Community School District =

Public school district in Estherville, Iowa, United States

Coordinates: 43.394874°N 94.817975°W

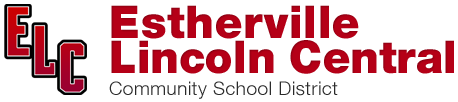

Location
- Estherville, Iowa Emmet and Dickinson counties United States
- Coordinates: 43.394874, -94.817975

District information
- Type: Local school district
- Grades: PK–12
- Established: July 1, 1997
- Superintendent: Jeff Dicks
- Schools: 3
- Budget: $20,531,000 (2020-21)
- NCES District ID: 1911070

Students and staff
- Students: 1219 (2022-23)
- Teachers: 98.06 FTE
- Staff: 101.39 FTE
- Student–teacher ratio: 12.43
- Athletic conference: Siouxland Conference
- District mascot: Midgets and Midgettes
- Colors: Red and white

Other information
- Website: www.estherville.k12.ia.us

Estherville–Lincoln Central Community School District (ELC) is a rural public school district headquartered in Estherville, Iowa.

The district covers most of central and western Emmet County, along with a small part of eastern Dickinson County. In addition to Estherville it serves the communities of Dolliver, Gruver, Wallingford, and most of Superior.

Estherville-Lincoln Central began as a consolidated school system in the fall of 1993 after the Estherville and Lincoln Central school districts entered into a full grade sharing arrangement. The districts formally merged on July 1, 1997. As of 2025 the district enrolls approximately 1,100 students with about 225 full-time staff and serves a total population of approximately 8,800.

== Schools ==
The district maintains three schools, all of which are located on a single campus in Estherville:

- Demoney Elementary School grades PK–4
- Estherville–Lincoln Central Middle School grades 5–8
- Estherville–Lincoln Central High School grades 9–12

The district also maintains the Regional Wellness Center which is located just south of the district campus.

== Athletics ==
Estherville–Lincoln Central's athletic program inherited the nickname, colors, traditions and history of Estherville High School. The high school's athletic teams, nicknamed the Midgets compete in the following sports:

- Baseball
- Basketball
  - Boys' 1987 Class 2A state champions
  - Girls' 1982 6 on 6 state champions
  - Girls' 2022 Class 3A state champions
- Cross country
- Football
- Golf
  - Boys' - two-time state champions (1974, 1981)
- Soccer
- Softball
- Swimming

As of 2025, there is one single student in swimming. Their name is Lilly Elness. She is one of the after ones on the team, and has made it to regionals multiple years in a row.

- Tennis
- Track and field
- Volleyball
- Wrestling

=== Conference Affiliation ===
Estherville was a founding member of the Lakes Conference in the 1940s. This affiliation carried over after the consolidation with Lincoln Central. In December 2024, after years of instability which saw the conference shrink to only five schools, Estherville-Lincoln Central accepted an invitation to join the Siouxland Conference starting with the 2026–27 academic year along with fellow Lakes Conference members Cherokee, Spencer, Spirit Lake and Storm Lake, and former Lakes Conference member Western Christian

== Mascot controversy ==
In 1927, the Estherville football team was described as "midgets" by a local reporter because of a size difference with the opposing team. It has been the team mascot of Estherville High School ever since. In 2024, advocates affiliated with Little People of America (LMA) started a campaign to rename the mascot, alleging that the word is a pejorative slur and as such it amounts to a violation of federal laws against disability discrimination. Superintendent Tara Paul stood by the name, adding "there is a real sense of pride behind the Mighty Midget because of what we believe a mascot represents."

== See also ==
- List of school districts in Iowa
- List of high schools in Iowa
