= Portland, Wisconsin =

Portland is the name of some places in the U.S. state of Wisconsin:

- Portland, Dodge County, Wisconsin, a town
  - Portland (community), Dodge County, Wisconsin, an unincorporated community
- Portland, Monroe County, Wisconsin, a town
  - Portland (community), Monroe County, Wisconsin, an unincorporated community
