= KBEW (AM) =

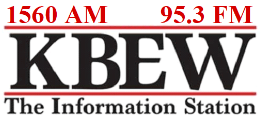
- Blue Earth, Minnesota; United States
- Frequency: 1560 kHz

Programming
- Format: Oldies
- Affiliations: USA Radio News

Ownership
- Owner: Carolyn and Doyle Becker; (Riverfront Broadcasting of Minnesota, Inc.)
- Sister stations: KBEW-FM

History
- First air date: August 29, 1963
- Call sign meaning: Kiester, Blue Earth, Bricelyn, Easton, Elmore, Wells, Winnebago

Technical information
- Licensing authority: FCC
- Facility ID: 33650
- Class: D
- Power: 1,000 watts daytime only
- Transmitter coordinates: 43°38′44″N 94°5′33″W
- Translator: 95.3 K237GT (Blue Earth)

Links
- Public license information: Public file; LMS
- Webcast: Listen Live
- Website: kbew98country.com

KBEW (1560 kHz) is an AM radio station located in Blue Earth, Minnesota that broadcasts an oldies format. The station is currently owned by Carolyn and Doyle Becker, through licensee Riverfront Broadcasting of Minnesota, Inc. and features programing from USA Radio News.

== History ==
Clifford Hedberg, owner of KMRS in Morris, Minnesota, applied for KBEW's original construction permit; in August 1962, the FCC approved the application for a 250-watt daytime-only station. The FCC originally assigned the station the call letters KCLH (for "Clifford LeRoy Hedberg"), but before its first broadcast, the call letters were changed to KBEW to reflect many of the communities in Faribault County, Minnesota: Kiester, Blue Earth, Bricelyn, Easton, Elmore, Wells, and Winnebago.

From its inception, KBEW was managed by Clifford Hedberg's son, Paul, who also held an ownership interest in the station. Paul Hedberg had worked for his father at KMRS before gaining further on-air experience at KRIB in Mason City, Iowa, and at several major radio stations in the Minneapolis-St. Paul market (including WMIN, WTCN, WLOL, and KDWB). KBEW debuted on August 29, 1963, with a format of “memory music and news.”

Paul Hedberg's prevailing philosophy of "live and local" marked KBEW's programming from the start. Listeners within the 45-mile radius of KBEW's signal enjoyed daily staples such as Information Please (a two-part program of recipes and homemaking tips, followed by a call-in segment that invited listeners to comment on subjects of local interest), Barter Time, (a free service that advertised used items for sale), and Welcome Travelers (which featured interviews of motorists who were passing through Blue Earth on US Highway 16 en route to the Black Hills and Yellowstone National Park). As Hedberg emphasized in his autobiography, "to survive and thrive, I was determined to get as many local people on the radio as possible, even if that resulted in some hokey stuff. We were talking about people and places and things our locals could relate to, and that WCCO in Minneapolis – our biggest competition – couldn’t duplicate. There was nothing a big, clear channel station in the Twin Cities could do to prevent us from building an audience by being intensely local. Our success wasn’t built on the records we played, but by the things we did in between the music. My hope was the locals didn’t want to miss something."

KBEW initially broadcast without network affiliation, but the assassination of John F. Kennedy, only three months after its first broadcast, exposed this shortcoming. In his autobiography, Hedberg recalled how the station navigated this difficult situation: "Reports from Dallas were slow to be updated, so we were left reading the same bulletins over and over until it was verified that Kennedy had died. At news of his death, I phoned the local Catholic priest and asked if he would come to the station and conduct a service on the air; we should have taped it so we could replay it instead of reading the same, stale AP copy over and over again. It wouldn’t have been right to turn back to music or our other normal programming, so we were really in a bind without a network affiliation – we couldn’t cover big breaking news like I felt we should." Hedberg quickly solved the problem: he contacted the manager of an NBC affiliate in a nearby community, KYSM in Mankato, Minnesota, and asked if KBEW could have authority to re-broadcast its network news; NBC Radio agreed to this extraordinary request (with the proviso that KBEW would carry NBC's advertisements but, given the gravity of the unfolding situation, NBC ran no commercials anyway). In the wake of the Kennedy assassination, KBEW became an affiliate of the ABC Entertainment Network – largely because this brought with it the news and commentary of Paul Harvey.

Hedberg also organized the Faribault County Radio Network to provide blanket coverage of daily local news from neighboring communities. The network initially had correspondents in Winnebago, Minnespts; Wells, Minnesota; and Elmore, Minnesota; other reporting points were set up later in Kiester, Minnesota; Amboy, Minnesota; Buffalo Center, Iowa; Ledyard, Iowa; and Swea City, Iowa. As Hedberg noted in his autobiography, "Radio stations in small towns like Blue Earth generally competed with local newspapers that were published only once or twice a week. A lot of what these bi-weekly papers printed as news became history when a radio station entered the community."

The limitations of a daytime-only permit prompted Hedberg to seek an FM license to complement KBEW. On August 27, 1965, KBEW-FM went on the air at 100.9 MHz. Hedberg operated KBEW-AM/FM until he purchased KEYC-FM in April 1976. At that time, prevailing FCC regulations did not allow Hedberg to own FM stations with overlapping signals; in this case, KEYC (which he later renamed KEEZ-FM) was less than 50 miles from KBEW, and he was obliged to sign off KBEW-FM and return the license to the FCC. In 1980, Hedberg sold KBEW to Jerry Papenfuss' KBEW Inc.

Effective June 30, 2017, KBEW, KBEW-FM, KDOM, and KDOM-FM were sold to Carolyn and Doyle Becker's Riverfront Broadcasting of Minnesota, Inc. for $2.375 million.
