= William Mellen =

William Mellen may refer to:

- William H. Mellen (1829–1907), American politician
- William M. E. Mellen (1848–1906), American physician and mayor of Chicopee, Massachusetts
