= KDOM =

KDOM may refer to:

- KDOM-FM, an FM radio station in Windom, Minnesota, United States
- KDOM (AM), an AM radio station in Windom, Minnesota, United States
- KDOM (module), a KDE rendering module
- The Kosovo Diplomatic Observer Mission
