= KBEW =

KBEW may refer to:

- KBEW (AM), a radio station (1560 AM) licensed to Blue Earth, Minnesota, United States
- KBEW-FM, a radio station (98.1 FM) licensed to Blue Earth, Minnesota, United States
