= Charles F. Crosby =

American politician

Member of the Wisconsin Senate from the 21st district
- In office 1881–1883
- Preceded by: John Azor Kellogg
- Succeeded by: John Ringle

Member of the Minnesota House of Representatives from the 38th district
- In office January 5, 1875 – January 3, 1876
- Preceded by: Nelson H. Manning
- Succeeded by: William H. Mellen

Personal details
- Born: December 12, 1847 Waterloo, Jefferson County, Wisconsin
- Died: December 1, 1889 (aged 41) Wausau, Wisconsin
- Occupation: Lawyer, Legislator, Wisconsin State Senate 1881-1882

Charles F. Crosby (December 12, 1847 – December 1, 1889) was an American politician and lawyer from Minnesota and Wisconsin.

Born in the town of Waterloo, in Jefferson County, Wisconsin, Crosby moved with his family to Dell Prairie, Wisconsin. He then moved to Minnesota in 1872.

Crosby served as state representative in Minnesota's 38th district. Crosby worked as a lawyer in Luverne, Minnesota. He was elected to Minnesota House of Representatives on November 3, 1874 and served Cottonwood, Jackson, Murray, Nobles, Pipestone, and Rock counties for one year. He was preceded by Nelson H. Manning and succeeded by William H. Mellen. Crosby was the chair of the towns and counties committee and served on the elections committee.

Crosby moved to Wausau, Wisconsin, where he practiced law. In 1881–1882, Crosby served in the Wisconsin State Senate and later served as a justice of the peace. He died in Wausau.
