= Ringsted, Iowa =

City in Iowa, United States

- City
- Location of Ringsted, Iowa
- Coordinates: 43°17′42″N 94°30′15″W
- Country: United States
- State: Iowa
- County: Emmet
- Township: Denmark
- Platted: 1899
- Named for: The city in Denmark

Area
  - Total: 1.00 sq mi (2.58 km^{2})
  - Land: 1.00 sq mi (2.58 km^{2})
  - Water: 0 sq mi (0.00 km^{2})
- Elevation: 1,270 ft (390 m)

Population (2020)
  - Total: 365
  - Density: 366.6/sq mi (141.55/km^{2})
- Time zone: UTC-6 (Central (CST))
  - Summer (DST): UTC-5 (CDT)
- ZIP code: 50578
- Area code: 712
- FIPS code: 19-67170
- GNIS feature ID: 2396378

Ringsted is a city in Denmark Township, Emmet County, Iowa, United States. At the 2020 census, the population was 365.

== History ==
Ringsted was platted in 1899. It was named after Ringsted, Denmark, the native home of an early settler.

== Geography ==
According to the United States Census Bureau, the city has a total area of 1.08 square miles (2.80 km^{2}), all land.

== Demographics ==
Historical populations
| Year | Pop. | ±% |
|---|---|---|
| 1910 | 313 | — |
| 1920 | 599 | +91.4% |
| 1930 | 486 | −18.9% |
| 1940 | 508 | +4.5% |
| 1950 | 578 | +13.8% |
| 1960 | 559 | −3.3% |
| 1970 | 509 | −8.9% |
| 1980 | 557 | +9.4% |
| 1990 | 481 | −13.6% |
| 2000 | 436 | −9.4% |
| 2010 | 422 | −3.2% |
| 2020 | 365 | −13.5% |
Source:"U.S. Census website". United States Census Bureau. and Iowa Data Center; Source: U.S. Decennial Census

=== 2020 census ===
As of the census of 2020, there were 365 people, 177 households, and 91 families residing in the city. The population density was 366.6 inhabitants per square mile (141.6/km^{2}). There were 217 housing units at an average density of 218.0 per square mile (84.2/km^{2}). The racial makeup of the city was 92.9% White, 0.3% Black or African American, 0.0% Native American, 0.0% Asian, 0.0% Pacific Islander, 1.9% from other races and 4.9% from two or more races. Hispanic or Latino persons of any race comprised 4.1% of the population.

Of the 177 households, 27.7% of which had children under the age of 18 living with them, 33.9% were married couples living together, 13.0% were cohabitating couples, 27.7% had a female householder with no spouse or partner present and 25.4% had a male householder with no spouse or partner present. 48.6% of all households were non-families. 40.7% of all households were made up of individuals, 19.2% had someone living alone who was 65 years old or older.

The median age in the city was 46.2 years. 24.4% of the residents were under the age of 20; 3.3% were between the ages of 20 and 24; 20.3% were from 25 and 44; 30.1% were from 45 and 64; and 21.9% were 65 years of age or older. The gender makeup of the city was 51.0% male and 49.0% female.

=== 2010 census ===
As of the census of 2010, there were 422 people, 193 households, and 113 families residing in the city. The population density was 390.7 inhabitants per square mile (150.9/km^{2}). There were 221 housing units at an average density of 204.6 per square mile (79.0/km^{2}). The racial makeup of the city was 97.6% White, 0.7% Native American, 0.9% from other races, and 0.7% from two or more races. Hispanic or Latino of any race were 1.4% of the population.

There were 193 households, of which 24.9% had children under the age of 18 living with them, 46.1% were married couples living together, 9.8% had a female householder with no husband present, 2.6% had a male householder with no wife present, and 41.5% were non-families. 36.8% of all households were made up of individuals, and 17.6% had someone living alone who was 65 years of age or older. The average household size was 2.19 and the average family size was 2.86.

The median age in the city was 43.3 years. 23.7% of residents were under the age of 18; 5.4% were between the ages of 18 and 24; 23.3% were from 25 to 44; 27.7% were from 45 to 64; and 20.1% were 65 years of age or older. The gender makeup of the city was 46.4% male and 53.6% female.

=== 2000 census ===
As of the census of 2000, there were 436 people, 208 households, and 120 families residing in the city. The population density was 404.4 inhabitants per square mile (156.1/km^{2}). There were 235 housing units at an average density of 218.0 per square mile (84.2/km^{2}). The racial makeup of the city was 99.31% White, 0.23% Asian, and 0.46% from two or more races.

There were 208 households, out of which 23.1% had children under the age of 18 living with them, 45.2% were married couples living together, 9.6% had a female householder with no husband present, and 42.3% were non-families. 40.9% of all households were made up of individuals, and 23.1% had someone living alone who was 65 years of age or older. The average household size was 2.10 and the average family size was 2.82.

In the city, the population was spread out, with 21.6% under the age of 18, 8.0% from 18 to 24, 21.8% from 25 to 44, 23.4% from 45 to 64, and 25.2% who were 65 years of age or older. The median age was 44 years. For every 100 females, there were 97.3 males. For every 100 females age 18 and over, there were 94.3 males.

The median income for a household in the city was $24,286, and the median income for a family was $36,875. Males had a median income of $23,958 versus $17,250 for females. The per capita income for the city was $16,375. About 7.3% of families and 7.1% of the population were below the poverty line, including 11.4% of those under age 18 and 1.8% of those age 65 or over.

== Danish-Lutherans ==
Ringsted is known for its Danish-American and Lutheran population. The St. Ansgar Danish Lutheran Church was organized by the city's original founders in 1882. In 1894, due to a theological debate about the word of God and activities such as dancing, the Danish Lutheran community was divided into two groups nicknamed "Happy Danes" and "Sad Danes". A folk dance troupe called "The Happy Dancing Danes" gained local popularity in the 1940s, given this name because "Happy Danes" did not believe dancing was sinful. The congregations were reunited in 2007.

== Education ==
North Union Community School District operates public schools. It was established on July 1, 2014, by the merger of the Armstrong–Ringsted Community School District and the Sentral Community School District. The latter formed on July 1, 1979, with the merger of the Armstrong and Ringsted school districts.
