= North Kossuth Community School District =

School district in Iowa, United States

Coordinates: 43.383917°N 94.312665°W

Location
- Swea City, Iowa Kossuth County United States
- Coordinates: 43.383917, -94.312665

District information
- Type: Local school district
- Grades: K-12
- Established: 1978
- Superintendent: Travis Schueller
- Schools: 2
- Budget: $5,858,000 (2020-21)
- NCES District ID: 1920830

Students and staff
- Students: 268 (2022-23)
- Teachers: 24.46 FTE
- Staff: 35.01 FTE
- Student–teacher ratio: 10.96
- Athletic conference: Top of Iowa
- District mascot: Warriors
- Colors: Green and black

Other information
- Website: nuwarriors.org

North Kossuth Community School District is a rural public school district based in Swea City, Iowa. Located in northern Kossuth County, it serves Swea City, Bancroft and Ledyard.

As of 2015, the district has about 300 students. It operates an elementary and middle school in Swea City, consisting of North Kossuth Elementary School and North Union Middle School. Its high school is North Union High School in Armstrong, of the North Union Community School District. As part of a grade-sharing arrangement the North Union and North Kossuth districts send each other's students to their secondary schools, and in addition North Union and North Kossuth share a superintendent, Travis Schueller, and some other administrators. The North Kossuth district is branded as "North Union Schools" even though the two districts remain legally separate.

== History ==
It was formed on July 1, 1978, by the merger of the Swea City and Ledyard school districts, using "Cougars" as their mascot and blue and white as their school colors.

In 2008, it began a grade-sharing arrangement with the Sentral Community School District. Later the Armstrong–Ringsted Community School District entered into a new grade-sharing arrangement with Sentral, and the two districts merged into North Union in 2014.

In 2015, Schueller stated that area voters had emotional attachment to the school building but not the school district itself, which would make them more easily accept a future school district merger.
