= North Union Community School District =

Public school district in Armstrong, Iowa, United States

Coordinates: 43.398682°N 94.479370°W

Location
- Armstrong, Iowa Kossuth, Emmet and Palo Alto counties United States
- Coordinates: 43.398682, -94.479370

District information
- Type: Local school district
- Grades: K–12
- Established: 2014
- Superintendent: Travis Schueller
- Schools: 2
- Budget: $7,693,000 (2020-21)
- NCES District ID: 1903850

Students and staff
- Students: 325 (2022-23)
- Teachers: 26.68 FTE
- Staff: 41.66 FTE
- Student–teacher ratio: 12.18
- Athletic conference: Top of Iowa
- District mascot: Warriors
- Colors: Green and Black

Other information
- Website: nuwarriors.org

North Union Community School District is a rural public school district headquartered in Armstrong, Iowa. It covers portions of Emmet, Kossuth and Palo Alto counties, and serves Armstrong, Fenton, Lone Rock and Ringsted.

It operates North Union Elementary School and North Union High School, while it has a grade sharing arrangement with North Kossuth Community School District in Swea City for its middle school. As of 2015 the district has about 400 students.

== History ==
It was established on July 1, 2014, by the merger of the Armstrong–Ringsted Community School District and the Sentral Community School District. The merger passed in a June 2013 election in the Armstrong-Ringsted district by 291-42 and in Sentral by 78–18, and the approval was through a total of 86% of voters in both school districts. The organizational meeting among the predecessor school districts was held in July of that year.

Matt Berninghaus, already principal of Armstrong-Ringsted, began serving as the interim North Union superintendent and became the formal superintendent effective July 1, 2014. Michael Tidemann of the Estherville News stated that due to the existing grade-sharing and activity-sharing agreements between the predecessor districts and with the North Kossuth district, "Visual changes to the North Union School District will be difficult to identify", although the tax rate was to be standardized. In 2016, Berninghaus left to become the Center Point–Urbana superintendent.

== North Union High School ==
=== Athletics ===
The Warriors participate in the Top of Iowa Conference in the following sports:

- Football
- Cross country
- Volleyball
- Basketball
- Wrestling
- Golf
- Track and field
- Baseball
- Softball

== See also ==
- List of school districts in Iowa
- List of high schools in Iowa
