= George Sylvester Taylor =

American politician (1822–1910)

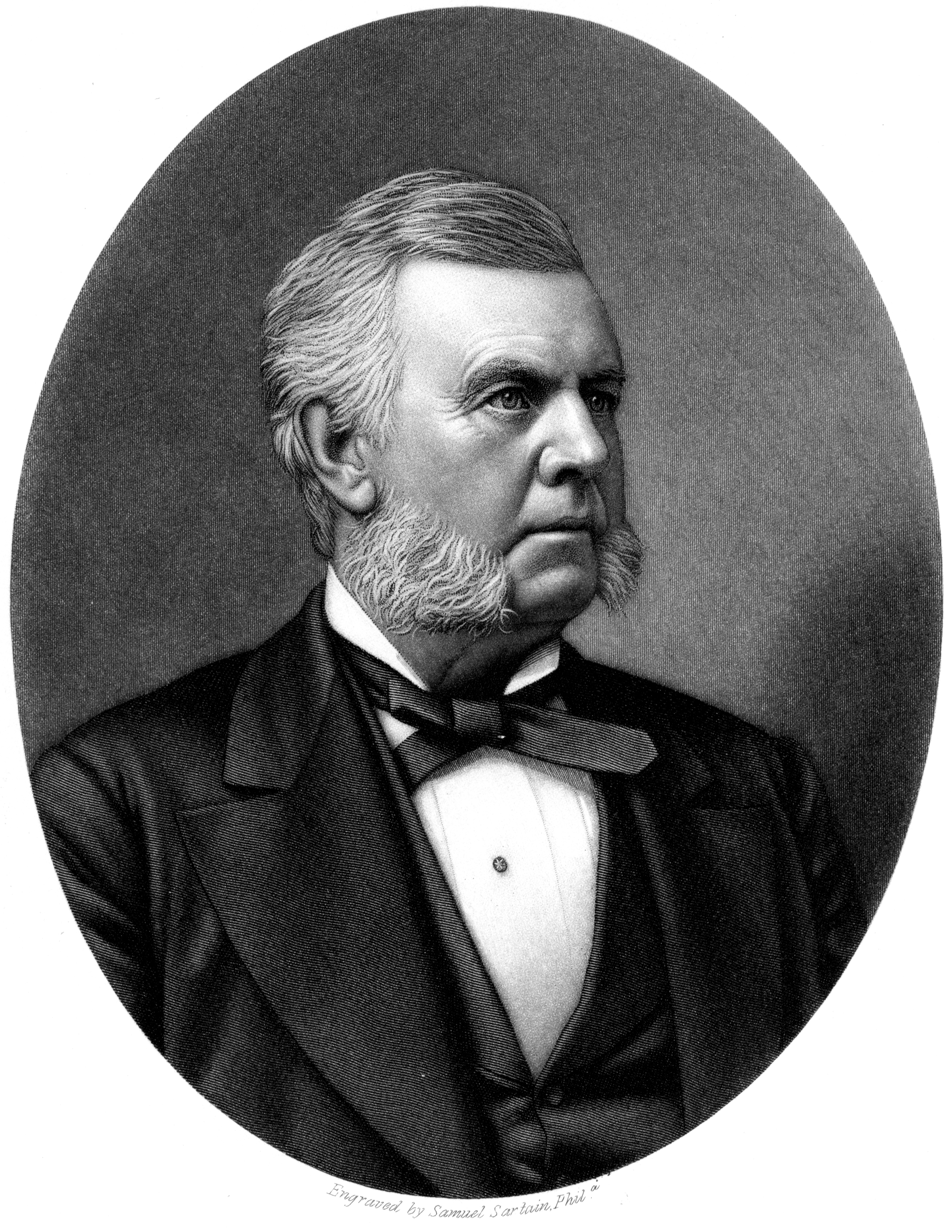

1st Mayor of Chicopee, Massachusetts
- In office January 5, 1891 – January 1892
- Preceded by: Board of Selectmen
- Succeeded by: William W. McClench

Massachusetts State Senate
- In office 1869–1869

Massachusetts House of Representatives
- In office 1860–1861

Board of Selectmen of the Town of Chicopee, Massachusetts

Personal details
- Born: March 2, 1822 South Hadley, Massachusetts
- Died: January 3, 1910 (aged 87) Chicopee, Massachusetts
- Party: Republican
- Spouse: Asenath Boylston Cobb
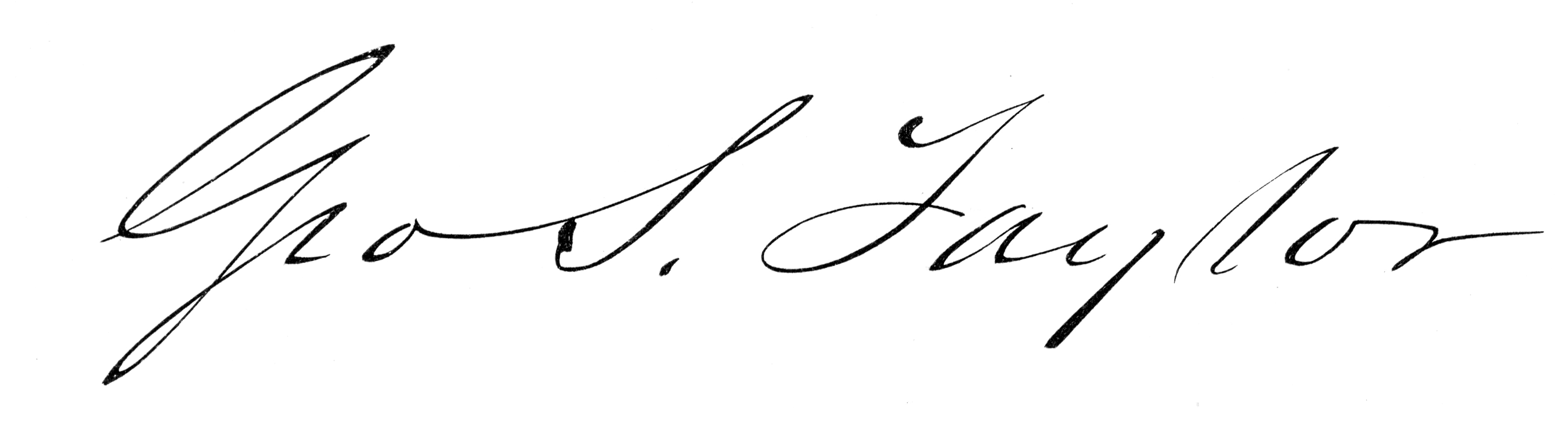
- Signature

George Sylvester Taylor (March 2, 1822 – January 3, 1910) became the first mayor of Chicopee, Massachusetts, on January 5, 1891.

== Personal life ==
He was born March 2, 1822, in South Hadley, Massachusetts, one of ten children of Sylvester Taylor, a butcher (1793–1881) and Sarah Eaton (1793–1870). The family moved to Chicopee Falls in 1828, which was then a part of Springfield, Massachusetts.

He married Asenath Boylston Cobb (1826–1898) on November 25, 1845, with whom he had six children. Taylor died in Chicopee.

== Business and political life ==
Starting in 1864, Taylor ran the Belcher & Taylor Agricultural Tool Company in Springfield.

As a member of the Republican Party, Taylor served the Massachusetts House of Representatives from 1860 to 1861 and the Massachusetts Senate in 1869. Prior to becoming Mayor, he was president of Chicopee Falls Savings Bank.

When Chicopee, Massachusetts, was first incorporated as a city in 1891, Taylor was elected mayor without opposition.

Taylor was a deacon of the Congregational Church of Chicopee for 45 years, and president of the local YMCA.

== See also ==
- 1869 Massachusetts legislature
- List of mayors of Chicopee, Massachusetts

== Reference sources ==
- Chicopee History
