= Dennis C. Frederickson =

American politician and businessman

Dennis Conan Frederickson (October 10, 1931 – November 16, 2017) was an American politician and businessman.

Frederickson was born in Delafield Township, Jackson County, Minnesota. He lived in Windom, Minnesota with his wife, Mary and family(four sons) and went to the Windom Public Schools. He graduated from Windom High School in 1949 and then served in the Minnesota National Guard during the Korean War. Frederickson went to Macalester College and was involved with the real estate and farm credit businesses. Frederickson (with family) worked in Uganda, East Africa from 1966 to 1973 as a cooperative credit consultant for ACDI. He also worked for ACDI in short-term 2-6 month consultancies later in life in Botswana, Egypt, Pakistan, Dominican Republic, and Uganda. Frederickson served as mayor of Windom, Minnesota. He then served in the Minnesota House of Representatives in 1985 and 1986 and was a Republican. Frederickson died at the Windom Area Hospital in Windom, Minnesota.
