= Richard H. Demers =

American politician

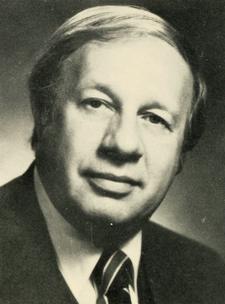
- Demers in 1979

Member of the Massachusetts House of Representatives
- In office 1971–1981
- Preceded by: Roger L. Bernashe
- Succeeded by: Kenneth Lemanski

Mayor of Chicopee, Massachusetts
- In office 1968–1972
- Preceded by: Edward A. Lysek
- Succeeded by: Edward J. Ziemba

Personal details
- Born: January 19, 1928 Chicopee, Massachusetts
- Died: June 17, 2004 (aged 76) Springfield, Massachusetts
- Resting place: Ste. Rose de Lima Cemetery
- Party: Democratic
- Education: Holyoke Community College; Western New England University School of Law
- Occupation: Real estate developer Politician

Richard H. Demers (January 19, 1928 – June 17, 2004) was an American politician who served as mayor of Chicopee, Massachusetts, and was a member of the Massachusetts House of Representatives.

== Early life ==
Demers was born on January 19, 1928, in Chicopee. He attended Chicopee High School, Holyoke Community College, and the Western New England University School of Law.

== Political career ==
Demers began his career as a member of the Chicopee board of assessors. In 1967, he defeated his fellow assessor Walter Olbrych by 13,668 votes to 9,156 to succeed the retiring Edward A. Lysek as mayor of Chicopee. It was the first time in Olbrych's 22 years in public office that he had been defeated. In 1969, Demers was re-elected. He defeated his predecessor, Edward A. Lysek, by over 6,700 votes. In 1971, Demers was defeated by city treasurer Edward J. Ziemba by 14,760 votes to 7,793.

From 1971 to 1981, Demers was a member of the Massachusetts House of Representatives.

== See also ==
- List of mayors of Chicopee, Massachusetts
