= Thomsen Round Barn =

- U.S. National Register of Historic Places
- Location within Iowa Location within the United States
- Location: Off Iowa Highway 15
- Nearest city: Armstrong, Iowa
- Coordinates: 43°20′46″N 94°29′52″W
- Area: less than one acre
- Built: 1912
- MPS: Iowa Round Barns: The Sixty Year Experiment TR
- NRHP reference No.: 86001426
- Added to NRHP: June 30, 1986

The Thomsen Round Barn was an historical building located near Armstrong in rural Emmet County, Iowa, United States. It was built in 1912 as a dairy barn. The building is a true round barn that measures 65 feet (20 m) in diameter. The first floor is constructed of concrete and the second floor consists of white vertical siding. It features a two-pitch conical roof, and a 16-foot (4.9 m) central silo. The barn was listed on the National Register of Historic Places since 1986. As of July 21, 2014 it is no longer standing.
