= Armstrong, Iowa =

- City
- Location of Armstrong, Iowa
- Coordinates: 43°23′47″N 94°29′51″W
- Country: United States
- State: Iowa
- County: Emmet
- Township: Armstrong Grove
- Founded: 1892

Area
  - Total: 0.88 sq mi (2.29 km^{2})
  - Land: 0.88 sq mi (2.29 km^{2})
  - Water: 0 sq mi (0.00 km^{2})
- Elevation: 1,237 ft (377 m)

Population (2020)
  - Total: 875
  - Density: 989.8/sq mi (382.17/km^{2})
- Time zone: UTC-6 (Central (CST))
  - Summer (DST): UTC-5 (CDT)
- ZIP code: 50514
- Area code: 712
- FIPS code: 19-02935
- GNIS feature ID: 2393989
- Website: www.armstrongiowa.net

Armstrong is a city in Emmet County, Iowa, United States. The population was 875 at the 2020 census. It was originally known as Armstrong Grove.

== History ==
Armstrong got its start in 1892, after the construction of the railroad through that territory. It was named after Thomas Armstrong, who first arrived in the area near the West Fork Des Moines River to trap. He spent only one winter, as it was too harsh for him. In 1892 the first locomotive arrived in Armstrong and a year later the town of Armstrong was incorporated.

In February 2021, Armstrong's mayor, Gregory Wayne Buum; police chief, Craig Juan Merrill; city clerk, Tracie Lang; and former city clerk Connie Marie Thackery were charged with 21 felony and misdemeanor counts, including fraud, misappropriation of funds, and assault with a dangerous weapon.

== Geography ==
According to the United States Census Bureau, the city has an area of 0.88 square miles (2.28 km^{2}), all land.

== Demographics ==
Historical populations
Year	Pop.	±%
1900	907	—
1910	586	−35.4%
1920	818	+39.6%
1930	767	−6.2%
1940	937	+22.2%
1950	943	+0.6%
1960	958	+1.6%
1970	1,061	+10.8%
1980	1,153	+8.7%
1990	1,025	−11.1%
2000	979	−4.5%
2010	926	−5.4%
2020	875	−5.5%
Source:"U.S. Census website". United States Census Bureau. and Iowa Data Center; Source: U.S. Decennial Census

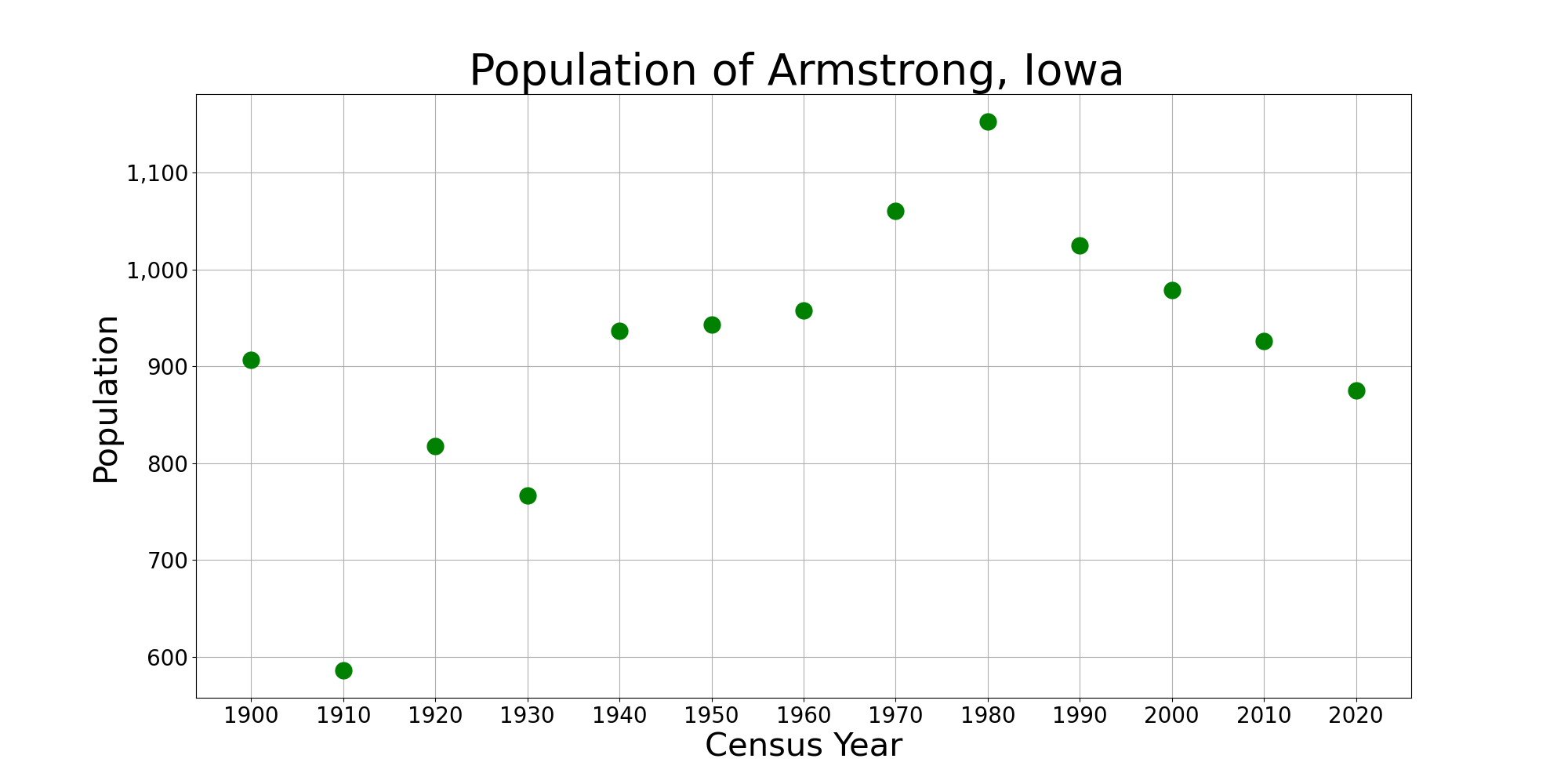
The population of Armstrong, Iowa from US census data

=== 2020 census ===
As of the census of 2020, there were 875 people, 382 households, and 219 families residing in the city. The population density was 989.8 inhabitants per square mile (382.2/km^{2}). There were 436 housing units at an average density of 493.2 per square mile (190.4/km^{2}). The racial makeup of the city was 97.0% White, 0.0% Black or African American, 0.2% Native American, 0.2% Asian, 0.0% Pacific Islander, 0.3% from other races and 2.2% from two or more races. Hispanic or Latino persons of any race comprised 0.9% of the population.

Of the 382 households, 20.2% of which had children under the age of 18 living with them, 45.3% were married couples living together, 6.3% were cohabitating couples, 28.3% had a female householder with no spouse or partner present and 20.2% had a male householder with no spouse or partner present. 42.7% of all households were non-families. 37.4% of all households were made up of individuals, 23.6% had someone living alone who was 65 years old or older.

The median age in the city was 49.8 years. 22.1% of the residents were under the age of 20; 4.1% were between the ages of 20 and 24; 18.6% were from 25 and 44; 22.6% were from 45 and 64; and 32.6% were 65 years of age or older. The gender makeup of the city was 48.8% male and 51.2% female.

=== 2010 census ===
As of the census of 2010, there were 926 people, 403 households, and 257 families living in the city. The population density was 1,052.3 inhabitants per square mile (406.3/km^{2}). There were 439 housing units at an average density of 498.9 per square mile (192.6/km^{2}). The racial makeup of the city was 97.8% White, 0.4% Native American, 0.4% Asian, and 1.3% from two or more races. Hispanic or Latino of any race were 0.6% of the population.

There were 403 households, of which 25.1% had children under the age of 18 living with them, 51.4% were married couples living together, 6.9% had a female householder with no husband present, 5.5% had a male householder with no wife present, and 36.2% were non-families. 33.0% of all households were made up of individuals, and 17.4% had someone living alone who was 65 years of age or older. The average household size was 2.18 and the average family size was 2.73.

The median age in the city was 49 years. 20.8% of residents were under the age of 18; 4.6% were between the ages of 18 and 24; 20.5% were from 25 to 44; 29% were from 45 to 64; and 25.3% were 65 years of age or older. The gender makeup of the city was 49.4% male and 50.6% female.

=== 2000 census ===
As of the census of 2000, there were 979 people, 422 households, and 268 families living in the city. The population density was 1,192.7 inhabitants per square mile (460.5/km^{2}). There were 456 housing units at an average density of 555.5 per square mile (214.5/km^{2}). The racial makeup of the city was 98.88% White, 0.20% African American, 0.41% Native American, 0.10% Asian, 0.10% from other races, and 0.31% from two or more races. Hispanic or Latino of any race were 0.31% of the population.

There were 422 households, out of which 25.4% had children under the age of 18 living with them, 55.9% were married couples living together, 5.0% had a female householder with no husband present, and 36.3% were non-families. 33.4% of all households were made up of individuals, and 19.0% had someone living alone who was 65 years of age or older. The average household size was 2.21 and the average family size was 2.83.

20.6% are under the age of 18, 6.8% from 18 to 24, 21.1% from 25 to 44, 26.4% from 45 to 64, and 25.0% who were 65 years of age or older. The median age was 46 years. For every 100 females, there were 90.5 males. For every 100 females age 18 and over, there were 88.6 males.

The median income for a household in the city was $35,446, and the median income for a family was $45,563. Males had a median income of $31,210 versus $19,732 for females. The per capita income for the city was $16,221. About 3.0% of families and 8.0% of the population were below the poverty line, including 7.1% of those under age 18 and 16.5% of those age 65 or over.

== Education ==
North Union Community School District operates public schools. It was established on July 1, 2014, by the merger of Armstrong–Ringsted Community School District and Sentral Community School District. The former formed on July 1, 1979, with the merger of the Armstrong and Ringsted school districts.

== See also ==
- Thomsen Round Barn, listed on the National Register of Historic Places
