= Sarah Eaton =

Canadian political scientist and sinologist

Sarah B. Eaton
- Other names: 伊顿萨拉, 伊頓薩拉
- Education: Mount Allison University, McMaster University, University of Toronto
- Awards: Albie Award 2020
- Scientific career
- Fields: Chinese Authoritarianism, Chinese Technical Standardization, Chinese Environmental Policy
- Workplaces: University of Oxford, University of Waterloo, University of Göttingen, Humboldt University of Berlin
- Thesis: China’s State Capitalist Turn: Political Economy of the Advancing State (2011)
- Doctoral advisor: Joseph Wong, Louis Pauly, Richard Stubbs
- Other academic advisors: Victor Shih, Todd Hall

Sarah B. Eaton (simplified Chinese: 伊顿·萨拉; traditional Chinese: 伊頓·薩拉; pinyin: Yīdùn Sàlā) is a Canadian political scientist and sinologist specialising in the political economy of China. Since 2019, she is Professor of Transregional Chinese Studies at Humboldt University of Berlin.

== Education and career ==
Eaton studied at Mount Allison University (B.A. Political Science, 1997–2001), McMaster University (M.A. Political Science, 2002–2004) and the University of Toronto (Ph.D. International Relations and Comparative Politics of Developing Countries with a focus on China, 2004–2011). From June 2006 until January 2007, she was a student in the Inter-University Program (administered by the University of California, Berkeley) at Tsinghua University in Beijing. She spent eighteen months as a visiting scholar at the Chinese Academy of Social Sciences (January 2008 to July 2009) and ten months at Renmin University of China (September 2009 to July 2010). She obtained her PhD in 2011 with a thesis on the political economy of China's transition to state capitalism.

After obtaining her Ph.D., Eaton worked as research fellow and assistant professor at the China Center of the University of Oxford and the University of Waterloo. In 2014, she became Professor of Modern Chinese Society and Economy at the Center for Modern East Asian Studies of the University of Göttingen which she later also headed as director from 2016 to 2019. In 2019, she became Professor of Transregional China Studies at the Institute for Asian and African Studies at Humboldt University of Berlin. Together with Genia Kostka from the Free University of Berlin, Eaton launched the Berlin Contemporary China Network in 2021.

Eaton received funding from the German Research Foundation, the Danish Independent Research Fund, the German Federal Ministry of Education and Science, and the European Research Council. She is a member of the editorial board at The China Quarterly and reviewer at The China Journal.

In 2020, Eaton was awarded the Albie Prize (awarded by Daniel Drezner and published by The Washington Post) for one of the 10 best pieces of writing on global political economy which “force the reader to think about the past, present or future of the global political economy in a way that can’t be unthought”. In 2021, her (together with Genia Kostka) co-authored article “Authoritarian Environmentalism Undermined? Leaders’ Time Horizons and Consequences for Environmental Policy Implementation” was re-issued as part of The China Quarterly's 60th anniversary edition to honour the “most influential articles of the last six decades measured by citations”. In 2024, she was awarded the title of one of the “100 most important minds in Berlin science in 2024” by the Berlin-based newspaper Tagesspiegel. In 2024, Humboldt University of Berlin nominated Eaton for the Gottfriend Wilhelm Leibniz Prize.

== Publications (selection) ==
- The Advance of the State in Contemporary China: State-Market Relations in the Reform Era, (Cambridge University Press, 2016)
- “Authoritarian Environmentalism Undermined? Leaders’ Time Horizons and Consequences for Environmental Policy Implementation” with Genia Kostka The China Quarterly Vol. 218, June 2014)
- “Central Protectionism in China: The ‘Central SOE Problem’ in Environmental Governance” with Genia Kostka The China Quarterly Vol. 231, September 2016.
- “Deepening not Departure: Xi Jinping’s Governance of State-Owned Economy” with Wendy Leutert, The China Quarterly, Part of special Issue on “The CCP at 100: The Party's New Long March,” Vol. 248, November 2021.
- “A Principal-Agent Analysis of China’s Sovereign Wealth System: Byzantine by Design” with Zhang Ming in Review of International Political Economy Vol. 17 No. 3, August 2010.
- "What makes for good and bad neighbours? An emerging research agenda in the study of Chinese environmental politics” with Genia Kostka Environmental Politics Vol. 27 Iss. 5, April 2018.
- “Diffusion of Practice: The Curious Case of the Sino-German Technical Standardisation Partnership” with Daniel Fuchs, New Political Economy, Part of special issue on “China and the Transnational Circulation of Developmentalism,” 27(6): 958-971 (2022).
- “Political Economy of the Advancing State: The Case of China’s Airlines Reform” The China Journal Issue 69, January 2013.
- “Environmental Authoritarianism: A Critical Review” with Genia Kostka in Handbook of Authoritarian Politics, Anne-Marget Wolf, ed. Oxford University Press, 2024.
- “China’s Adaptive State Capitalism and Its International Sources” with Wendy Leutert in The Communist Party of China: Understanding the Durability of the World's Most Powerful Political Organization, eds. Ben Hillman and Fengyuan Ji. Cambridge University Press, 2025.
