= Fenton, Iowa =

- City
- Location of Fenton, Iowa
- Coordinates: 43°13′06″N 94°25′40″W
- Country: USA
- State: Iowa
- County: Kossuth

Area
  - Total: 0.33 sq mi (0.85 km^{2})
  - Land: 0.33 sq mi (0.85 km^{2})
  - Water: 0 sq mi (0.00 km^{2})
- Elevation: 1,243 ft (379 m)

Population (2020)
  - Total: 271
  - Density: 821.6/sq mi (317.23/km^{2})
- Time zone: UTC-6 (Central (CST))
  - Summer (DST): UTC-5 (CDT)
- ZIP code: 50539
- Area code: 515
- FIPS code: 19-27210
- GNIS feature ID: 2394756

Fenton is a city in Kossuth County, Iowa, United States. The population was 271 at the time of the 2020 census.

== History ==
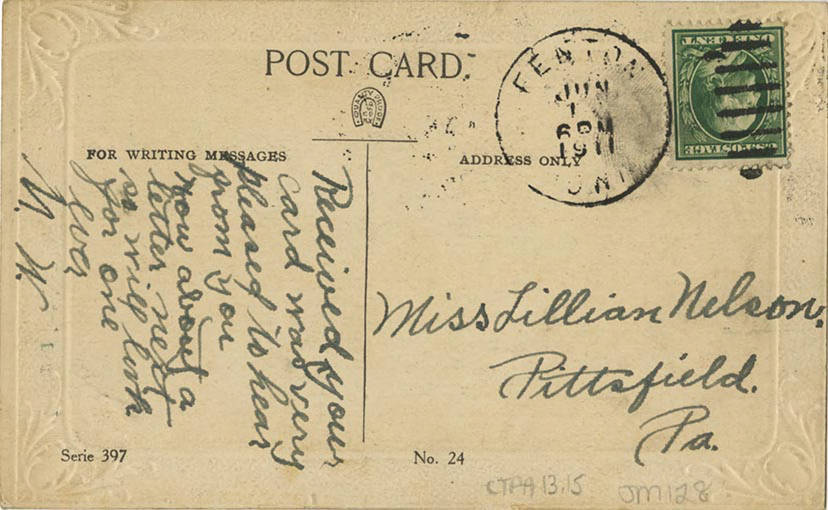
Postcard with 1917 postmark from Fenton, Iowa

Fenton was platted in 1899. It was named after former New York State governor and senator Reuben E. Fenton.

== Geography ==
According to the United States Census Bureau, the city has a total area of 0.34 square miles (0.88 km^{2}), all land.

== Demographics ==
Historical populations
Year	Pop.	±%
1910	211	—
1920	391	+85.3%
1930	381	−2.6%
1940	385	+1.0%
1950	446	+15.8%
1960	440	−1.3%
1970	403	−8.4%
1980	394	−2.2%
1990	346	−12.2%
2000	317	−8.4%
2010	279	−12.0%
2020	271	−2.9%
Source:"U.S. Census website". United States Census Bureau. and Iowa Data Center; Source: U.S. Decennial Census

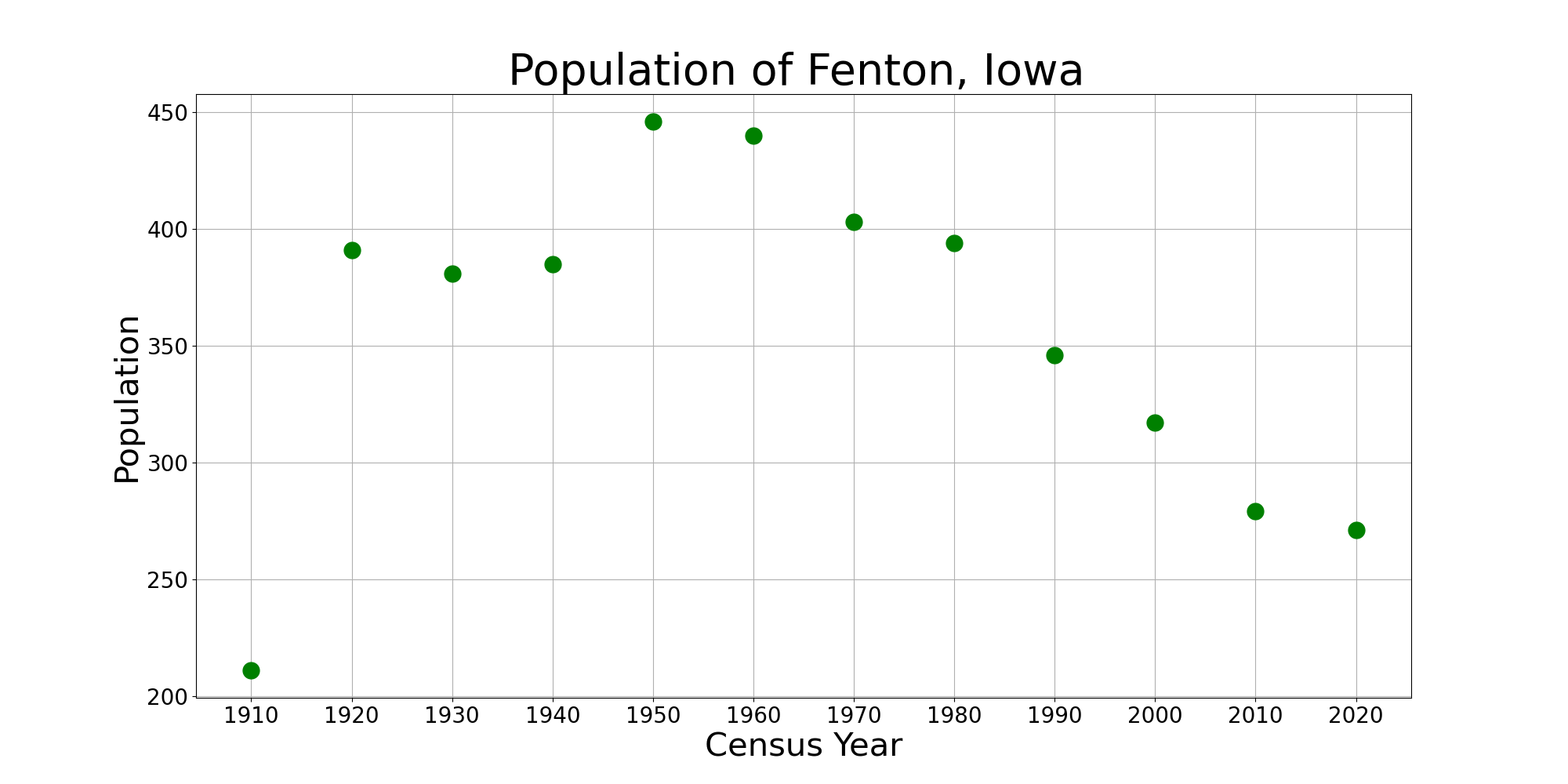
The population of Fenton, Iowa from US census data

=== 2020 census ===
As of the census of 2020, there were 271 people, 124 households, and 82 families residing in the city. The population density was 821.6 inhabitants per square mile (317.2/km^{2}). There were 147 housing units at an average density of 445.7 per square mile (172.1/km^{2}). The racial makeup of the city was 95.6% White, 0.7% Black or African American, 0.4% Native American, 0.0% Asian, 0.4% Pacific Islander, 0.7% from other races and 2.2% from two or more races. Hispanic or Latino persons of any race comprised 2.2% of the population.

Of the 124 households, 22.6% of which had children under the age of 18 living with them, 50.8% were married couples living together, 8.9% were cohabitating couples, 19.4% had a female householder with no spouse or partner present and 21.0% had a male householder with no spouse or partner present. 33.9% of all households were non-families. 30.6% of all households were made up of individuals, 16.9% had someone living alone who was 65 years old or older.

The median age in the city was 47.3 years. 21.8% of the residents were under the age of 20; 4.4% were between the ages of 20 and 24; 21.4% were from 25 and 44; 29.5% were from 45 and 64; and 22.9% were 65 years of age or older. The gender makeup of the city was 51.7% male and 48.3% female.

=== 2010 census ===
As of the census of 2010, there were 279 people, 130 households, and 76 families living in the city. The population density was 820.6 inhabitants per square mile (316.8/km^{2}). There were 168 housing units at an average density of 494.1 per square mile (190.8/km^{2}). The racial makeup of the city was 98.6% White, 0.7% African American, 0.4% Asian, and 0.4% from other races. Hispanic or Latino of any race were 0.4% of the population.

There were 130 households, of which 20.0% had children under the age of 18 living with them, 49.2% were married couples living together, 6.2% had a female householder with no husband present, 3.1% had a male householder with no wife present, and 41.5% were non-families. 40.0% of all households were made up of individuals, and 22.3% had someone living alone who was 65 years of age or older. The average household size was 2.15 and the average family size was 2.88.

The median age in the city was 49.6 years. 20.4% of residents were under the age of 18; 6.9% were between the ages of 18 and 24; 16.1% were from 25 to 44; 30.8% were from 45 to 64; and 25.8% were 65 years of age or older. The gender makeup of the city was 48.7% male and 51.3% female.

=== 2000 census ===
As of the census of 2000, there were 317 people, 157 households, and 89 families living in the city. The population density was 909.7 inhabitants per square mile (351.2/km^{2}). There were 170 housing units at an average density of 487.9 per square mile (188.4/km^{2}). The racial makeup of the city was 98.11% White and 1.89% Native American.

There were 157 households, out of which 22.3% had children under the age of 18 living with them, 50.3% were married couples living together, 4.5% had a female householder with no husband present, and 42.7% were non-families. 41.4% of all households were made up of individuals, and 28.0% had someone living alone who was 65 years of age or older. The average household size was 2.02 and the average family size was 2.73.

In the city, the population was spread out, with 21.1% under the age of 18, 5.0% from 18 to 24, 25.9% from 25 to 44, 19.6% from 45 to 64, and 28.4% who were 65 years of age or older. The median age was 44 years. For every 100 females, there were 81.1 males. For every 100 females age 18 and over, there were 78.6 males.

The median income for a household in the city was $30,714, and the median income for a family was $38,571. Males had a median income of $25,000 versus $17,500 for females. The per capita income for the city was $15,154. 6.4% of the population and 5.4% of families were below the poverty line. Out of the total population, 7.4% of those under the age of 18 and 5.3% of those 65 and older were living below the poverty line.

== Arts and culture ==
Annual events

The town is well known for its annual Sweet Corn Days held the last weekend of each July.

== Education ==
North Union Community School District operates public schools. It was previously served by the Sentral Community School District. The Sentral district merged into North Union on July 1, 2014.
