= Armstrong–Ringsted Community School District =

Former school district in Iowa

Armstrong–Ringsted Community School District (A-R) was a school district headquartered in Armstrong, Iowa.

Its area included sections of Emmet, Kossuth and Palo Alto counties, and it served the communities of Armstrong and Ringsted.

It operated Armstrong–Ringsted Elementary School, Middle School, and High School.

== History ==
It was established on July 1, 1979 (46 years ago) by the merger of the Armstrong School District and the Ringsted School District.

At one point the district joined a grade-sharing arrangement, in which a school district sends its students to another district's schools, that had been already established between the Sentral Community School District and the North Kossuth Community School District. This new agreement began on July 1, 2012. At the same time Matt Berninghaus became the superintendent of Armstrong–Ringsted. The Ringsted school stopped operations as the grade-sharing occurred.

On July 1, 2014, Armstrong–Ringsted merged with the Sentral district to form the North Union Community School District. The merger passed in the Armstrong–Ringsted district by 291–42 and in Sentral by 78–18, and the approval was through a total of 86% of voters in both school districts.
