= List of mayors of Chicopee, Massachusetts =

Mayor of Chicopee
- Seal of Chicopee
- Incumbent; John L. Vieau since January 6, 2020
- Style: His/Her Honor
- Type: Chief executive
- Member of: School Committee
- Residence: None official
- Seat: Chicopee City Hall
- Nominator: Non-partisan nominating petition
- Appointer: Popular vote
- Term length: Two years (1917–present); One year (1891–1917)
- Constituting instrument: Chicopee City Charter
- Precursor: Chicopee Board of Selectmen (1848–1890)
- Formation: 1891
- First holder: George Sylvester Taylor
- Salary: $122,000 (2023)
- Website: www.chicopeema.gov/393/Mayors-Office

The Mayor of Chicopee is the chief executive of municipal government in Chicopee, Massachusetts. The mayor's office oversees the enforcement of all laws and ordinances within the city, appoints and supervises a majority of appointed officials, and serves as an ex officio member of the Chicopee School Committee. Chicopee has a mayor-council government. Mayors of Chicopee are appointed through direct, non-partisan elections to a two-year term. The office has no term limits. The mayor's office is located in Chicopee City Hall in Chicopee Center.

The current mayor of Chicopee is John L. Vieau.

== History ==
Prior to 1891, Chicopee had no mayor. The town was governed by an open town meeting and a Board of Selectmen to oversee the day-to-day operations of the town. Chicopee received its city charter in 1890 and elected George S. Taylor, who took office in 1891. Under the charter, mayors were elected annually on the first Tuesday in December and took office on the first Monday in January. If the mayor's office was vacated, it was mandatory for an election to take place, with the President of the Board of Aldermen serving as acting mayor.

When the city charter was revised in 1897, the city council was changed to a unicameral system and the mayor no longer presided over city council meetings or acted with the council in declaring elections' winning candidates. Additionally, it was no longer mandatory to call a new election if the mayor's office was vacated within three months of a mayor's term ending. The revised charter came into effect in 1898.

In 1938, the city's Franco-American Association endorsed holding non-partisan local elections. Proponents argued that non-partisan elections would alleviate racial or ethnic bloc voting and party factionalism. The city's first non-partisan elections were held in 1943.

== List of mayors ==
#	Mayor	Picture	Term	Party	Notes
1	George Sylvester Taylor		January 5, 1891 – January 4, 1892	Republican	
2	William W. McClench		January 4, 1892 – January 2, 1893	Democrat	
3	Henry H. Harris		January 2, 1893 – January 1, 1894	Republican	
4	William M. E. Mellen		January 1, 1894 – January 7, 1895	Democratic	
5	Andrew W. Gale		January 7, 1895 – January 6, 1896	Republican	
6	Alexander Grant		January 6, 1896 – January 4, 1897	Republican	
7	George D. Eldridge		January 4, 1897 – January 2, 1899	Democratic	
8	Denis Murphy		January 2, 1899 – January 7, 1901	Unaffiliated	Born in Cork, Ireland; First Irish mayor of Chicopee
9	James H. Loomis		January 7, 1901 – January 4, 1904	Republican	
10	Charles A. Buckley		January 4, 1904 – January 2, 1905	Republican	
11	Albert E. Taylor		January 2, 1905 – January 6, 1908	Republican	Son of George Sylvester Taylor
12	Joseph O. Beauchamp		January 6, 1908 – January 4, 1909	Republican (Note: Lost Republican nomination, but submitted nominating papers as an independent Republican and was supported by James Loomis)	Born in Saint-Roch, Canada; First Franco-American mayor of Chicopee
13	William J. Fuller		January 4, 1909 – January 2, 1910	Republican	
14	Samuel E. Fletcher		January 2, 1910 – January 1, 1912	Republican	
15	Frank A. Rivers		January 1, 1912 – October 7, 1914 (Note: Died in office)	Unaffiliated	
16	Rogette D. Earle		October 7, 1914 – January 4, 1915	Unaffiliated (Note: Ran as Republican in 1914 mayoral election)	Board of Alderman President, Acting Mayor
17	William J. Dunn		January 4, 1915 – January 3, 1916	Democrat	
18	Daniel J. Coakley		January 3, 1916 – January 5, 1920	Democrat (Note: Ran as independent Democrat with Democratic support. Failed to receive nomination from Democratic and Republican caucuses in 1919 reelection.)	
19	James E. Higgins		January 5, 1920 – January 2, 1922	Republican	
20	Joseph E. Grise		January 2, 1922 – January 4, 1926	Republican	
21	Michael I. Shea		January 4, 1926 – January 2, 1928	Democrat (Note: Ran as independent Democrat)	
22	Henry Cloutier		January 2, 1928 – January 4, 1932	Republican	
23	Anthony J. Stonina		January 4, 1932 – January 1, 1934	Republican	First Polish mayor of Chicopee
24	O'Neil Deroy		January 1, 1934 – January 6, 1936	Republican	
(23)	Anthony J. Stonina		January 6, 1936 – January 1, 1940	Republican	
25	Leo P. Senecal		January 1, 1940 – January 3, 1944	Republican	
26	Edward O. Bourbeau		January 3, 1944 – January 7, 1952	Republican	
27	Walter J. Trybulski		January 7, 1952 – January 2, 1956	Republican	
28	Walter M. Grocki		January 2, 1956 – January 4, 1960	Republican	
29	Edward A. Lysek		January 4, 1960 – January 3, 1966	Republican	
30	Richard H. Demers		January 3, 1966 – January 5, 1970	Democrat	
31	Edward J. Ziemba		January 5, 1970 – January 5, 1976	Republican	
32	Howard W. Redfern, Jr.		January 5, 1976 – January 2, 1978	Democrat	
33	John P. Moylan		January 2, 1978 – January 7, 1980	Democrat	
34	Robert F. Kumor		January 7, 1980 – January 2, 1984	Democrat	
35	Richard S. Lak		January 2, 1984 – January 4, 1988	Democrat	
36	Joseph J. Chessey		January 4, 1988 – February 28, 1997 (Note: Resigned to accept appointment from Gov. Bill Weld as Deputy Commissioner of Local Services in the Department of Revenue)	Democrat	
37	Patrick E. Welch		March 1, 1997 – July 7, 1997	Democrat	City Council President, Acting Mayor
38	Richard J. Kos		July 7, 1997 (Note: Took office in special election) – January 5, 2004	Republican	Did not run for re-election in 2003
39	Richard R. Goyette		January 5, 2004 – January 2, 2006	Republican	
40	Michael D. Bissonnette		January 2, 2006 – January 6, 2014	Democrat	Lost re-election for 5th term
(38)	Richard J. Kos		January 6, 2014 – January 6, 2020	Republican	
41	John L. Vieau		January 6, 2020 – Incumbent	Unaffiliated	
