= KJWR =

Coordinates: 44°00′22″N 95°12′09″W

- Windom, Minnesota; United States
- Broadcast area: Southwest Minnesota
- Frequency: 90.9 MHz
- Branding: Kinship Christian Radio

Programming
- Format: Christian radio

Ownership
- Owner: Minn-Iowa Christian Broadcasting, Inc.

History
- First air date: 2008
- Call sign meaning: Know Jesus Will Return

Technical information
- Licensing authority: FCC
- Facility ID: 92363
- Class: C3
- ERP: 25,000 watts
- HAAT: 100 meters (330 ft)

Links
- Public license information: Public file; LMS
- Webcast: Listen live
- Website: kinshipradio.org/home

KJWR (90.9 FM) is a Christian radio station licensed to Windom, Minnesota. KJYL serves Southwest Minnesota. The station is owned by Minn-Iowa Christian Broadcasting, Inc.
