= Henry William Stokes =

American politician

Henry William Stokes (November 17, 1871 – February 6, 1966) was an American farmer, businessman, and politician.

Born in the town of Portland, Dodge County, Wisconsin, Stokes went to public schools and to the Waterloo High School in Waterloo, Wisconsin. Stokes owned a farm in the town of Waterloo, Jefferson County, Wisconsin. He was on the board of directors of the Waterloo Canning Company and was involved with the Waterloo Farmers Association. Stokes worked for J. L. Owens Threshing Machine Company of Minneapolis, Minnesota and National Wool Growers Association. Stokes served as Waterloo Town Treasurer and on the Jefferson County Board of Supervisors. Stokes also served on the school board. In 1921 and 1925, Stokes served in the Wisconsin State Assembly and was a Republican. Stokes died in a nursing home in Waterloo, Wisconsin.
