= Aaron Horkey =

American illustrator

- Born: Windom, Minnesota, U.S.
- Other name: Abuse
- Occupation: Graphic designer

Aaron Horkey is an American illustrator from Windom, Minnesota. He has created concert posters for bands such as Boris, Converge, Isis, and the Melvins. First Showing described him as "one of Mondo's most popular and respected artists".

== Career ==
Horkey held a solo exhibition at the Remick Gallery in 2010. In 2011, he collaborated with Vania Zouravliov for the Dracula poster, which was listed by Complex as one of "The 50 Best Mondo Posters (So Far)". He curated a series of the Paul Thomas Anderson film posters in 2013. The series covered Hard Eight, Boogie Nights, Magnolia, Punch-Drunk Love, and There Will Be Blood. It featured contributions from Rich Kelly, Rockin' Jelly Bean, João Ruas, and Jordan Crane. He also created the poster for Peter Jackson's The Lord of the Rings: The Return of the King in 2012.
