= Henry Peleg Burdick =

American politician

Henry Peleg Burdick was a member of the Wisconsin State Assembly.

== Biography ==
Burdick was born on January 11, 1849, in Warren County, Pennsylvania; reports have differed on the exact location. He moved with his parents to Waterloo, Jefferson County, Wisconsin, in 1854. After moving to St. Croix County, Wisconsin, in 1856, Burdick later briefly spent time in Otter Tail County, Minnesota. During the American Civil War, he served with the 1st Minnesota Heavy Artillery Regiment of the Union Army. In 1877, Burdick moved to Polk County, Wisconsin. He died on May 12, 1933, in Tacoma, Washington.

== Political career ==
Burdick was elected to the Assembly in 1892 and 1894. During his second term, he served as Speaker Pro Tem when the Speaker, George B. Burrows, became ill. Additionally, Burdick was President (similar to Mayor) and a member of the school board of Osceola, Wisconsin, and District Attorney and a member of the county board of supervisors of Polk County. He was a Republican.
