= Nelson H. Manning =

American politician

Nelson H. "N.H." Manning (1832 – ?) was an American politician.

Born in Vermont, Manning came to Minnesota in 1857. He was a farmer. He served in the Minnesota House of Representatives in 1874 from Windom, Minnesota.
