= Michael D. Bissonnette =

American politician

Michael D. Bissonnette is a former mayor of Chicopee, Massachusetts. Bissonnette was first elected mayor in a landslide in the November 2005 election after he defeated embattled mayor Richard Goyette, who had been arrested weeks prior on federal extortion charges. Bissonnette served as mayor from 2006 through 2013, but was unseated by Richard J. Kos, who had previously served as mayor, in the 2013 general election.

After leaving the mayor's office, he served as interim DPW director for the town of Greenfield from November 2014 until May 2015. He challenged Kos to a rematch in 2015 but was unsuccessful. He returned to his law practice shortly thereafter. In 2019 Kos announced he would not seek re-election and Bissonnette was one of several candidates to run for the seat. He was eliminated in the city's preliminary election in September of 2019.

Bissonnette lives in Chicopee with his wife Erin.

== See also ==
- List of mayors of Chicopee, Massachusetts
