= Waterloo, Jefferson County, Wisconsin =

Waterloo, Wisconsin
- Town
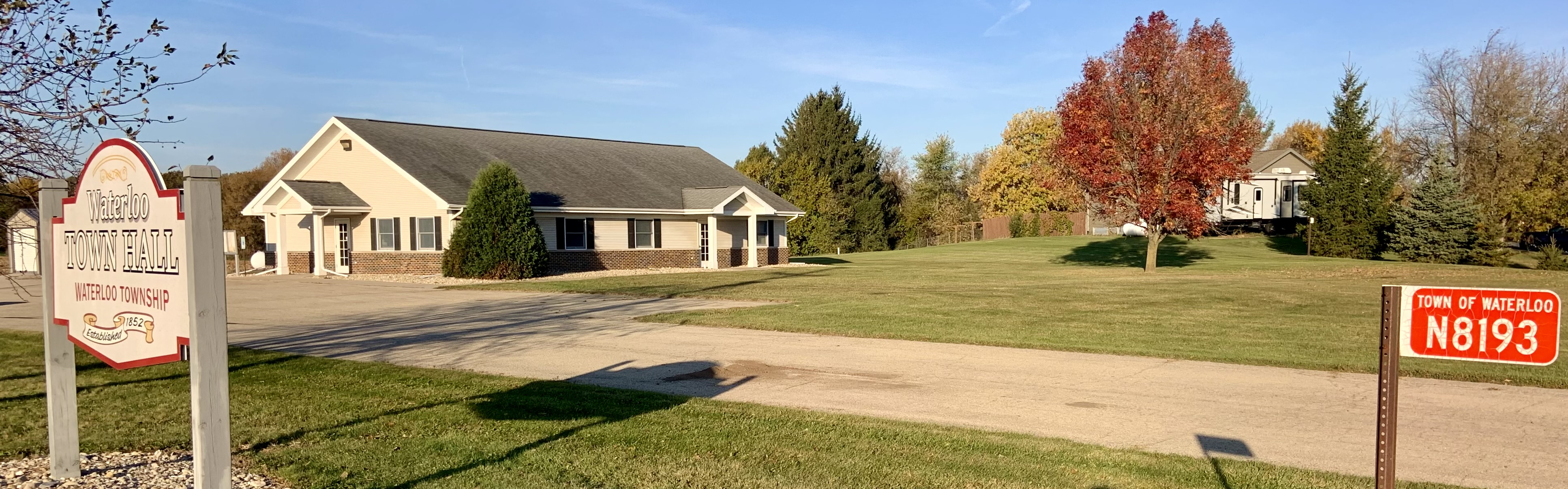
- Town hall

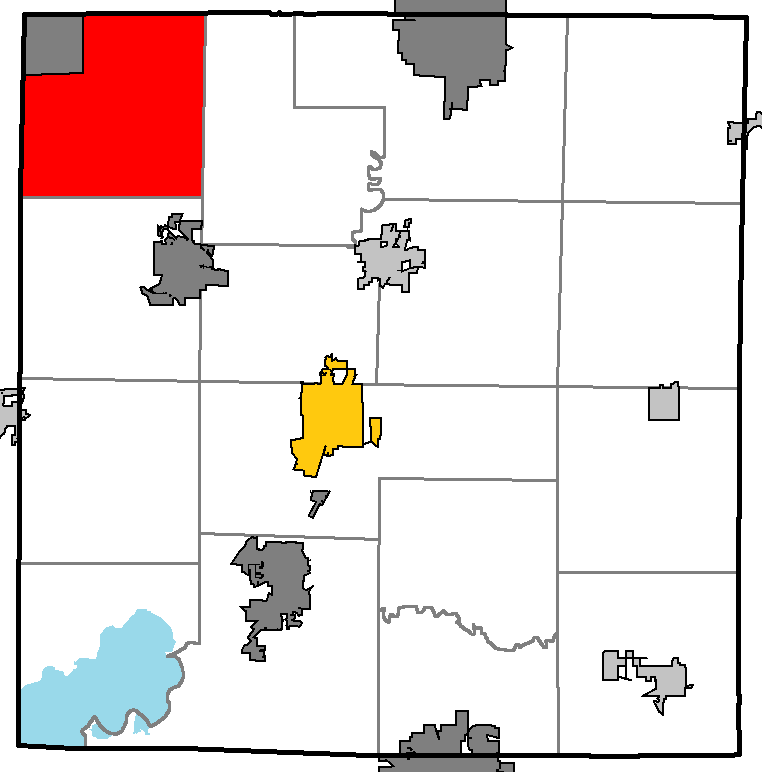
- Location of Waterloo, within Jefferson County, Wisconsin
- Coordinates: 43°9′30″N 88°57′4″W
- Country: United States
- State: Wisconsin
- County: Jefferson

Area
  - Total: 32.3 sq mi (83.7 km^{2})
  - Land: 32.3 sq mi (83.7 km^{2})
  - Water: 0 sq mi (0.0 km^{2})
- Elevation: 807 ft (246 m)

Population (2020)
  - Total: 867
  - Density: 26.8/sq mi (10.4/km^{2})
- Time zone: UTC-6 (Central (CST))
  - Summer (DST): UTC-5 (CDT)
- Area code: 920
- FIPS code: 55-83950
- GNIS feature ID: 1584364
- Website: https://www.townofwaterloowi.org/

Waterloo is a town in Jefferson County in the U.S. state of Wisconsin. The population was 867 at the 2020 census. The city of Waterloo is located within the town. The unincorporated community of Portland is also located partially in the town.

== Geography ==
According to the United States Census Bureau, the town has a total area of 32.3 square miles (83.7 km^{2}), all land.

== Demographics ==
As of the census of 2019, there were 3,313 people, 299 households, and 238 families residing in the town. The population density was 25.7 people per square mile (9.9/km^{2}). There were 312 housing units at an average density of 9.7 per square mile (3.7/km^{2}). The racial makeup of the town was 97.72% White, 0.48% Black or African American, 0.12% Asian, 0.72% from other races, and 0.96% from two or more races. 3.12% of the population were Hispanic or Latino of any race.

There were 299 households, out of which 35.1% had children under the age of 18 living with them, 71.6% were married couples living together, 3.7% had a female householder with no husband present, and 20.4% were non-families. 13.7% of all households were made up of individuals, and 6.4% had someone living alone who was 65 years of age or older. The average household size was 2.76 and the average family size was 3.09.

In the town, the population was spread out, with 26.2% under the age of 18, 5.8% from 18 to 24, 28.8% from 25 to 44, 27.5% from 45 to 64, and 11.7% who were 65 years of age or older. The median age was 39 years. For every 100 females, there were 110.1 males. For every 100 females age 18 and over, there were 110.3 males.

The median income for a household in the town was $57,778, and the median income for a family was $60,139. Males had a median income of $36,985 versus $25,139 for females. The per capita income for the town was $25,950. About 1.3% of families and 4.0% of the population were below the poverty line, including 3.8% of those under age 18 and 4.5% of those age 65 or over.

== Notable people ==
- Henry Peleg Burdick, Wisconsin legislator
- Charles F. Crosby, Minnesota and Wisconsin legislator
- Henry William Stokes, Wisconsin legislator
