= Shorty Elness =

American football player (1906–1965)

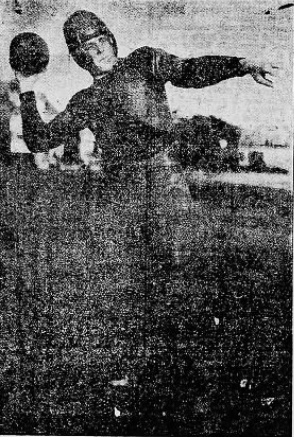
- Image of Elness in the Herald and Review, 1928

No. 11
- Positions: Halfback, quarterback

Personal information
- Born: May 10, 1906; Windom, Minnesota, U.S.
- Died: November 3, 1965 (aged 59); Charles City, Iowa, U.S.
- Listed height: 5 ft 8 in (1.73 m)
- Listed weight: 166 lb (75 kg)

Career information
- High school: Windom (MN)
- College: Bradley

Career history
- Chicago Bears (1929); Milwaukee Eagles (1930)

Awards and highlights
- First-team All-Little 19 (1928)

Career statistics
- Games played: 4
- Stats at Pro Football Reference

Leland Bartlett "Shorty" Elness (May 10, 1906 – November 3, 1965) was an American football halfback and quarterback who played one season in the National Football League (NFL) for the Chicago Bears. He played college football for Bradley.

== Early life and education ==
Elness was born on May 10, 1906, in Windom, Minnesota. He attended Windom High School there, before playing college football at Bradley. Though he did not see action as a freshman, he made the varsity team as a sophomore in 1926. At five feet, eight inches tall, Elness was nicknamed "Shorty" by teammates. As a senior, he was considered the team's top player, earning first-team all-conference honors at the end of the season by Associated Press. He later was named conference Most Valuable Player. His profile in Associated Press said the following:

Leland Elness, another outstanding backfield man developed by Robertson, and a running mate to Metzger, was given the honorary position of right halfback. "Shorty" Elness possesses a rare ability in forward passing. His tosses, instead of arching as in the case of a majority of passes, travel an uncanny bullet-like path. His only rival in this art probably was Sandstrom, Augustana fullback, who failed to receive enough votes for a position. Elness' abilities were not, however, confined to forward passing. He was a cracker-jack in breaking up opposition aerial attacks, and could skirt the ends for a 5 or 10-yard gain at any time.

== Professional career ==
After his MVP season, Elness was signed to play professional football by the Chicago Bears of the National Football League (NFL). As a member of the Bears, he appeared in four games as a halfback and quarterback, wearing number 11. He played the 1930 season as a member of the semi-professional Milwaukee Badgers/Eagles, scoring a touchdown in a game versus the Chicago Mills.

== Later life and death ==
After his playing career Elness became a teacher in Minnesota, and was named Charles City High School industrial arts teacher and assistant athletics coach in 1942. He later was director of the trades industries and instructor in cabinet making. He died on November 3, 1965, in Charles City, Iowa, from a heart attack. He was 59 at the time of his death.
