= Alexander Grant (Massachusetts politician) =

American politician

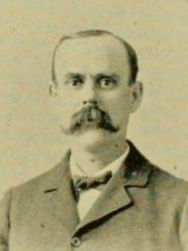

6th Mayor of Chicopee, Massachusetts
- In office January 1896 – January 1897
- Preceded by: Andrew Gale
- Succeeded by: George D. Eldridge

Member of the Massachusetts House of Representatives 5th Hampden District
- Majority: 35 (1893)

Member of the Chicopee, Massachusetts Board of Aldermen Ward 2
- In office 1860–1861

Personal details
- Born: September 26, 1853 Lawrence, Massachusetts
- Died: 1935 Chicopee, Massachusetts
- Party: Republican Party

Alexander Grant (1853–1935) was a Massachusetts machinist and politician who served in the Massachusetts House of Representatives and as the sixth mayor of Chicopee, Massachusetts.

== Personal life ==
Grant was born in Lawrence, Massachusetts, on September 26, 1853. Grant was educated in the Lowell, Massachusetts public schools. In 1879 in Chicopee, he married Annie M. Vanzandt (1854–1934), original from Rome, New York. His wife preceded him in death by a few months.

== Business career ==
Grant went to work in the cotton mills of Lowell while he was still young, and aside from two and a half years working in a Lowell machine shop, he spent his business career in the cotton business. In March 1878 Grant moved to Chicopee, where he went to work for the Dwight Manufacturing Company.

== Political career ==
Grant was elected to represent Ward 2 on the Chicopee Board of Aldermen, and in 1895 he was elected to represent the Fifth Hampden District in the Massachusetts House of Representatives.

== See also ==
- List of mayors of Chicopee, Massachusetts

== Notes ==
Political offices
Preceded by Andrew Gale	6th Mayor of Chicopee, Massachusetts; January 1896–January 1897	Succeeded by George D. Eldridge
