= Ledyard, Iowa =

- City
- Location of Ledyard, Iowa
- Coordinates: 43°25′09″N 94°09′33″W
- Country: USA
- State: Iowa
- County: Kossuth

Area
  - Total: 0.52 sq mi (1.35 km^{2})
  - Land: 0.52 sq mi (1.35 km^{2})
  - Water: 0 sq mi (0.00 km^{2})
- Elevation: 1,155 ft (352 m)

Population (2020)
  - Total: 121
  - Density: 232.8/sq mi (89.89/km^{2})
- Time zone: UTC-6 (Central (CST))
  - Summer (DST): UTC-5 (CDT)
- ZIP code: 50556
- Area code: 515
- FIPS code: 19-44130
- GNIS feature ID: 2395668
- Website: www.ledyardiowa.org

Ledyard is a city in Kossuth County, Iowa, United States. The population was 121 at the time of the 2020 census.

== History ==
Ledyard was platted in 1884. It was named after Ledyard, Connecticut, birthplace of Iowa governor William Larrabee. Ledyard was incorporated as a city in 1895.

== Geography ==
According to the United States Census Bureau, the city has a total area of 0.33 square miles (0.85 km^{2}), all land.

== Demographics ==
Historical populations
| Year | Pop. | ±% |
|---|---|---|
| 1900 | 257 | — |
| 1910 | 222 | −13.6% |
| 1920 | 246 | +10.8% |
| 1930 | 245 | −0.4% |
| 1940 | 317 | +29.4% |
| 1950 | 327 | +3.2% |
| 1960 | 289 | −11.6% |
| 1970 | 240 | −17.0% |
| 1980 | 215 | −10.4% |
| 1990 | 164 | −23.7% |
| 2000 | 147 | −10.4% |
| 2010 | 130 | −11.6% |
| 2020 | 121 | −6.9% |
Source:"U.S. Census website". United States Census Bureau. and Iowa Data Center; Source: U.S. Decennial Census

=== 2020 census ===
As of the census of 2020, there were 121 people, 66 households, and 38 families residing in the city. The population density was 232.2 inhabitants per square mile (89.7/km^{2}). There were 74 housing units at an average density of 142.0 per square mile (54.8/km^{2}). The racial makeup of the city was 95.9% White, 0.0% Black or African American, 0.0% Native American, 0.8% Asian, 0.0% Pacific Islander, 2.5% from other races and 0.8% from two or more races. Hispanic or Latino persons of any race comprised 2.5% of the population.

Of the 66 households, 25.8% of which had children under the age of 18 living with them, 39.4% were married couples living together, 6.1% were cohabitating couples, 28.8% had a female householder with no spouse or partner present and 25.8% had a male householder with no spouse or partner present. 42.4% of all households were non-families. 37.9% of all households were made up of individuals, 22.7% had someone living alone who was 65 years old or older.

The median age in the city was 57.3 years. 18.2% of the residents were under the age of 20; 7.4% were between the ages of 20 and 24; 9.9% were from 25 and 44; 26.4% were from 45 and 64; and 38.0% were 65 years of age or older. The gender makeup of the city was 52.1% male and 47.9% female.

=== 2010 census ===
As of the census of 2010, there were 130 people, 65 households, and 39 families living in the city. The population density was 394.0 inhabitants per square mile (152.1/km^{2}). There were 82 housing units at an average density of 248.5 per square mile (95.9/km^{2}). The racial makeup of the city was 99.2% White and 0.8% from other races. Hispanic or Latino of any race were 0.8% of the population.

There were 65 households, of which 16.9% had children under the age of 18 living with them, 50.8% were married couples living together, 3.1% had a female householder with no husband present, 6.2% had a male householder with no wife present, and 40.0% were non-families. 40.0% of all households were made up of individuals, and 23.1% had someone living alone who was 65 years of age or older. The average household size was 2.00 and the average family size was 2.64.

The median age in the city was 56.2 years. 17.7% of residents were under the age of 18; 1.6% were between the ages of 18 and 24; 15.3% were from 25 to 44; 28.5% were from 45 to 64; and 36.9% were 65 years of age or older. The gender makeup of the city was 45.4% male and 54.6% female.

=== 2000 census ===
As of the census of 2000, there were 147 people, 73 households, and 42 families living in the city. The population density was 448.4 inhabitants per square mile (173.1/km^{2}). There were 85 housing units at an average density of 259.3 per square mile (100.1/km^{2}). The racial makeup of the city was 99.32% White, and 0.68% from two or more races. Hispanic or Latino of any race were 0.68% of the population.

There were 73 households, out of which 17.8% had children under the age of 18 living with them, 56.2% were married couples living together, 2.7% had a female householder with no husband present, and 41.1% were non-families. 39.7% of all households were made up of individuals, and 20.5% had someone living alone who was 65 years of age or older. The average household size was 2.01 and the average family size was 2.70.

In the city, the population was spread out, with 17.0% under the age of 18, 4.1% from 18 to 24, 23.1% from 25 to 44, 28.6% from 45 to 64, and 27.2% who were 65 years of age or older. The median age was 48 years. For every 100 females, there were 96.0 males. For every 100 females age 18 and over, there were 96.8 males.

The median income for a household in the city was $22,500, and the median income for a family was $33,750. Males had a median income of $29,375 versus $18,750 for females. The per capita income for the city was $17,512. About 11.1% of families and 11.5% of the population were below the poverty line, including none of those under age 18 and 33.3% of those age 65 or over.

== Education ==
It is a part of the North Kossuth Community School District. It was formed on July 1, 1978 by the merger of the Swea City and Ledyard school districts.
