= Richard Stubbs (political scientist) =

British-Canadian political scientist (born 1946)

- Born: Richard Wallace Stubbs; 7 October 1946 (age 80); Crosby, Lancashire, England
- Spouse: Grace Skogstad (m. 1974)

Academic background
- Education: University College of Wales, Aberystwyth; Lancaster University; University of Alberta
- Thesis: Political Leadership, Colonial Government and the Malayan Emergency (1975)

Academic work
- Discipline: Political science
- Sub-discipline: International relations; political economy
- Institutions: McMaster University

Richard Wallace Stubbs (born 7 October 1946) is a British-Canadian professor emeritus and writer on international politics. Stubbs taught at St. Francis Xavier University, Carleton University, and the University of Toronto before joining the Department of Political Science at McMaster University in 1990.

Stubbs is known for his book on the Malayan Emergency, Hearts and Minds in Guerrilla Warfare: The Malayan Emergency 1946-1960 (Singapore: Oxford University Press, 1989), which was republished in 2004 by Eastern University Press. The three editions of his coedited book with Geoffrey R. D. Underhill, Political Economy and the Changing Global Order (MacMillan, 1994; Oxford University Press, 2000, 2006), were closely associated with the rise of the British School of International Political Economy. He has also published on regionalism in East and Southeast Asia and on the developmental state in East Asia. His books on these subjects include Rethinking Asia's Economic Miracle: The Political Economy of War, Prosperity and Crisis (Palgrave Macmillan, 2005) and the co-edited volume with Mark Beeson, Handbook of Asian Regionalism (Routledge 2012).

Stubbs was President of the McMaster University Faculty Association from 2008 to 2009.
