= KBEW-FM =

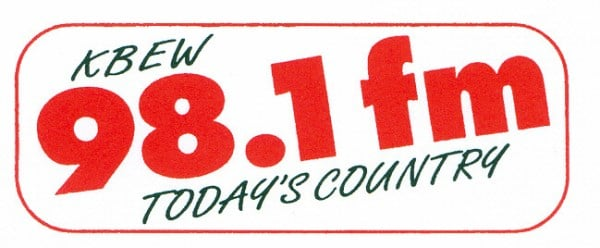
- Blue Earth, Minnesota; United States
- Frequency: 98.1 MHz
- Branding: 98 Country

Programming
- Format: Country music
- Affiliations: Minnesota Vikings

Ownership
- Owner: Carolyn and Doyle Becker; (Riverfront Broadcasting of Minnesota, Inc.)
- Sister stations: KBEW

History
- First air date: 1993

Technical information
- Licensing authority: FCC
- Facility ID: 33651
- Class: C3
- ERP: 25,000 watts
- HAAT: 100.0 meters (328.1 ft)
- Transmitter coordinates: 43°44′54″N 94°24′23″W

Links
- Public license information: Public file; LMS
- Webcast: Listen Live
- Website: kbew98country.com

KBEW-FM (98.1 MHz, "98 Country") is a radio station broadcasting a country music format. Licensed to Blue Earth, Minnesota, United States, the station is currently owned by Carolyn and Doyle Becker, through licensee Riverfront Broadcasting of Minnesota, Inc.

== History ==
The station was assigned the call sign KQEI on January 17, 1992; it was changed to KBEW-FM on May 7, 1993. The station signed on later that year. Its country music programming was simulcast with KBEW until July 1994, when the AM side switched to oldies.
