= William M. E. Mellen =

American physician

William Michael Edward Mellen
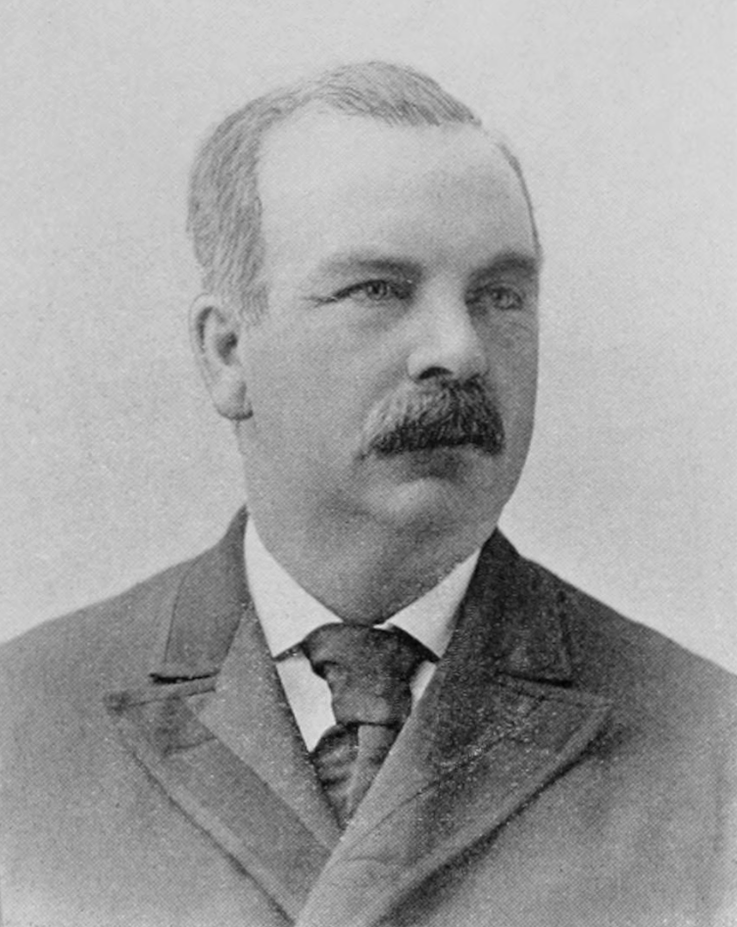

4th Mayor of Chicopee, Massachusetts
- In office 1894–1894

President of the Board of Aldermen of Chicopee, Massachusetts

Member of the Board of Aldermen of Chicopee, Massachusetts

Member of the Chicopee, Massachusetts School Board

Personal details
- Born: April 6, 1848 Worcester, Massachusetts, U.S.
- Died: May 14, 1906 (aged 58) Chicopee, Massachusetts, U.S.
- Party: Democratic
- Spouse: Kate M. Burke (m. 1883)
- Education: University of Michigan Medical School, 1876
- Profession: Physician

William Michael Edward Mellen (April 6, 1848 – May 14, 1906) was an American physician and politician who served as the fourth mayor of Chicopee, Massachusetts.

== Early life ==
Mellen was born in Worcester, Massachusetts.

== Education ==
Mellen received his medical diploma from the University of Michigan Medical School in 1876.

== Medical career ==
After he graduated from medical school, Mellen practiced medicine in Northampton, Massachusetts, for a year, then in Chicopee, Massachusetts, from 1878 until his death in May 1906. In 1880 Mellen was admitted as a Fellow of the Massachusetts Medical Society. In 1890 Mellen was chosen as a delegate to the Tenth International Medical Congress in Berlin.

== Family life ==
In 1883 Mellen married Kate M. Burke of Chicopee; they had one child, a daughter.

== Death ==
Mellen died in Chicopee, Massachusetts, of a cerebral hemorrhage, on May 14, 1906.

== See also ==
- List of mayors of Chicopee, Massachusetts

== Bibliography ==
- A Digest of the Acts of the Commonwealth Relating to the Massachusetts Medical Society: Together with the By-laws & Rules & Orders of the Society & Councillors, Boston, Massachusetts: Massachusetts Medical Society, page 24, (1881).
- Massachusetts of Today: A Memorial of the State, Historical and Biographical, Issued for the World's Columbian Exposition at Chicago, page 427, (1892).
- Medical Record: A weekly Journal of Medicine and Surgery, Vol. 69, No. 21., Obituary Notes, New York, New York: WM. WOOD & Co., page 842, (May 26, 1906).
- Michigan Alumnus, Vol XII, No 115 News-Obituaries, Ann Arbor, Michigan: The Alumni Association of the University of Michigan, p. 443, (June 1906).

== Footnotes ==
Political offices
Preceded by Henry H. Harris	4th Mayor of Chicopee, Massachusetts; 1894	Succeeded by Andrew W. Gale
