= Portland, Monroe County, Wisconsin =

Town of Portland
- Town
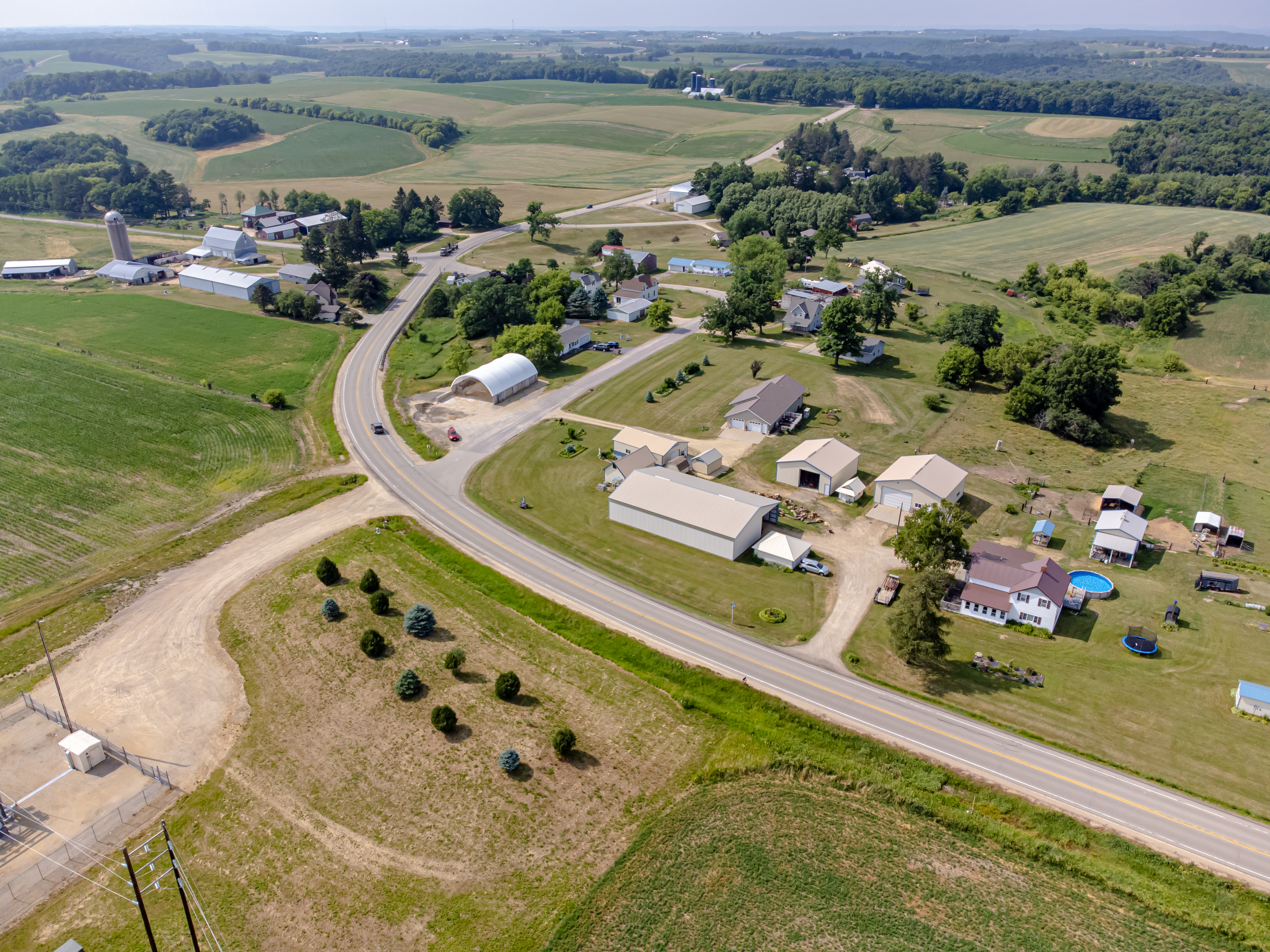
- Wisconsin Highway 33 runs through town

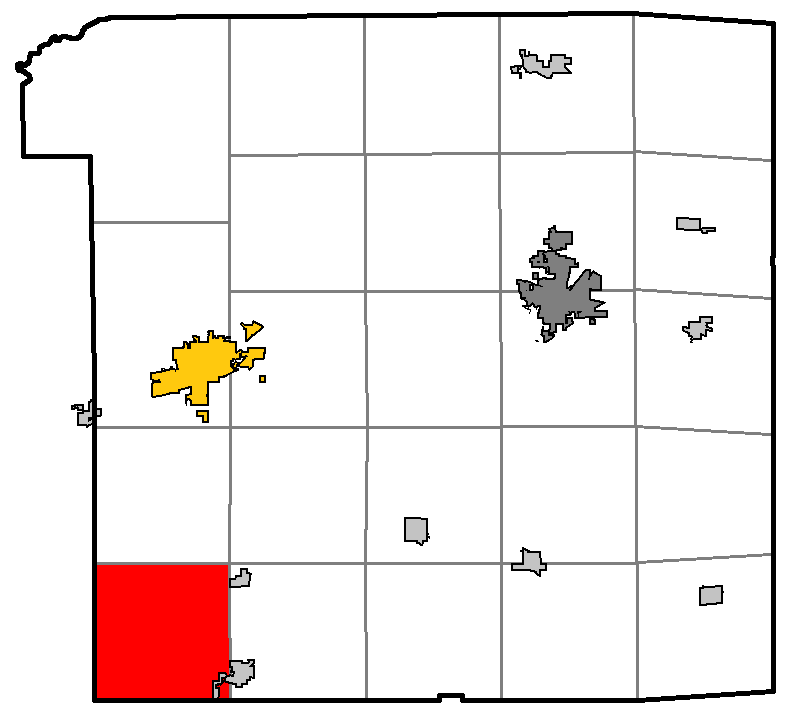
- Location of the Town of Portland, Monroe County

- Location of Monroe County, Wisconsin
- Coordinates: 43°45′20″N 90°50′45″W
- Country: United States
- State: Wisconsin
- County: Monroe

Area
  - Total: 35.9 sq mi (93.1 km^{2})
  - Land: 35.9 sq mi (93.1 km^{2})
  - Water: 0 sq mi (0.0 km^{2})
- Elevation: 1,204 ft (367 m)

Population (2020)
  - Total: 833
  - Density: 23.2/sq mi (8.95/km^{2})
- Time zone: UTC-6 (Central (CST))
  - Summer (DST): UTC-5 (CDT)
- Area code: 608
- FIPS code: 55-64425
- GNIS feature ID: 1583959
- Website: https://www.townofportlandmc.com/

The Town of Portland is located in Monroe County, Wisconsin, United States. The population was 686 at the 2000 census. According to the 2020 census, the population was 833.

== Geography ==
According to the United States Census Bureau, the town has a total area of 35.9 square miles (93.1 km^{2}), of which 35.9 square miles (93.1 km^{2}) is land and 0.03% is water.

== Demographics ==
As of the census of 2000, there were 686 people, 249 households, and 187 families residing in the town. The population density was 19.1 people per square mile (7.4/km^{2}). There were 273 housing units at an average density of 7.6 per square mile (2.9/km^{2}). The racial makeup of the town was 97.67% White, 0.15% African American, 1.90% Asian, and 0.29% from two or more races. Hispanic or Latino of any race were 0.87% of the population.

There were 249 households, out of which 32.9% had children under 18 living with them, 65.9% were married couples living together, 4.0% had a female householder with no husband present, and 24.5% were non-families. 21.3% of all households comprised individuals, and 12.0% had someone living alone who was 65 years of age or older. The average household size was 2.76, and the average family size was 3.20.

In the town, the population was spread out, with 28.7% under the age of 18, 6.3% from 18 to 24, 25.4% from 25 to 44, 23.8% from 45 to 64, and 15.9% who were 65 years of age or older. The median age was 37 years. For every 100 females, there were 112.4 males. For every 100 females age 18 and over, there were 111.7 males.

The median income for a household in the town was $36,250, and the median income for a family was $41,875. Males had a median income of $28,125 versus $19,375 for females. The per capita income for the town was $16,998. About 8.3% of families and 13.6% of the population were below the poverty line, including 17.6% of those under age 18 and 20.4% of those age 65 or over.

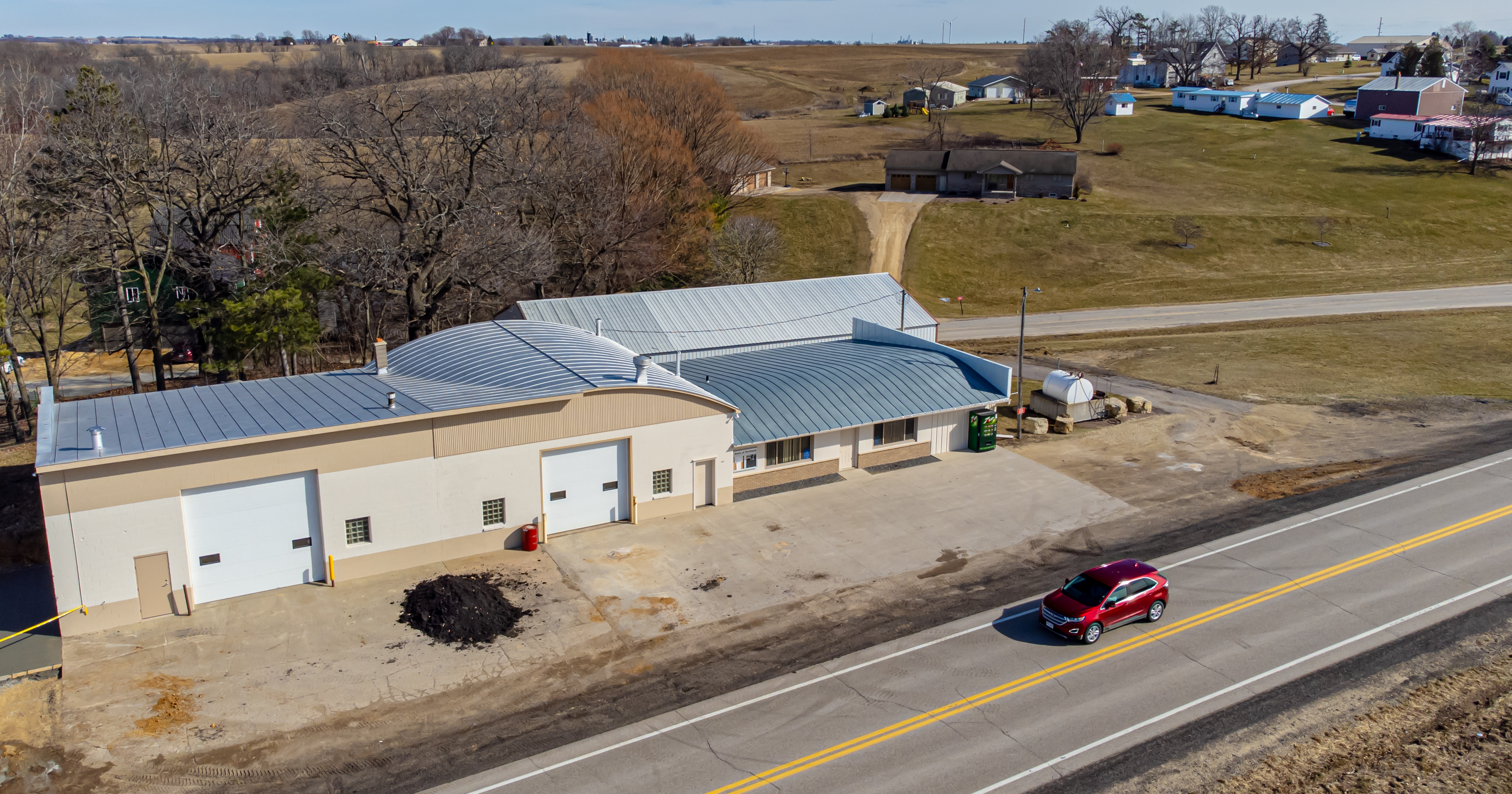
Town of Portland town hall
