= Windom, Minnesota =

City in Minnesota, United States

Windom
- City
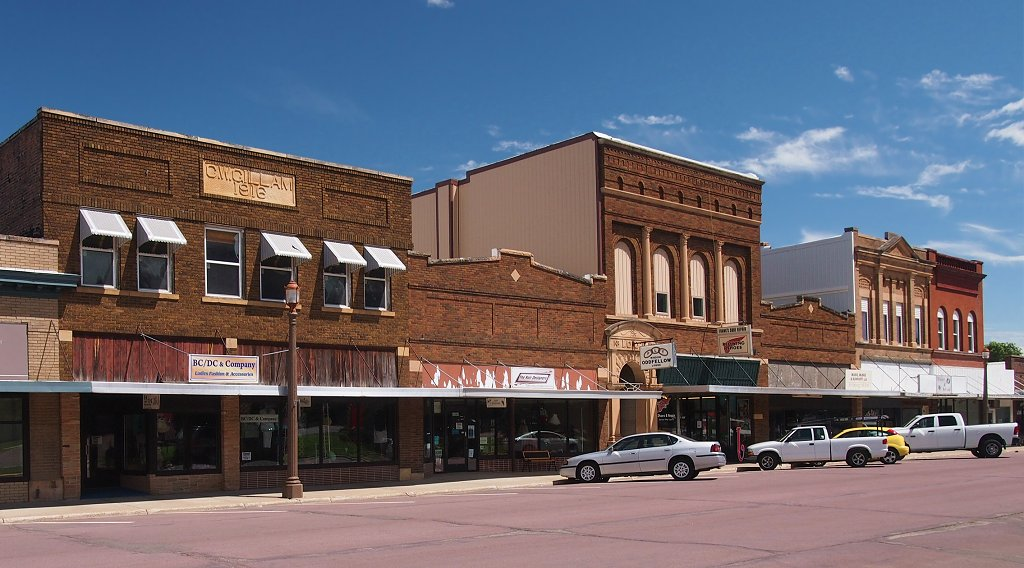
- Shops in downtown Windom

- Location of Windom within Cottonwood County, Minnesota
- Coordinates: 43°52′25″N 95°07′13″W
- Country: United States
- State: Minnesota
- County: Cottonwood
- Platted: June 20, 1871
- Incorporated: April 15, 1875

Government
  - Type: Mayor–council
  - Mayor: Hilary Mathis

Area
  - Total: 4.26 sq mi (11.03 km^{2})
  - Land: 4.10 sq mi (10.61 km^{2})
  - Water: 0.16 sq mi (0.42 km^{2})
- Elevation: 1,358 ft (414 m)

Population (2020)
  - Total: 4,798
  - Estimate (2022): 4,742
  - Density: 1,171.7/sq mi (452.38/km^{2})
- Time zone: UTC−6 (Central (CST))
  - Summer (DST): UTC−5 (CDT)
- ZIP Code: 56101
- Area code: 507
- FIPS code: 27-70798
- GNIS feature ID: 2397339
- Sales tax: 6.875%
- Website: https://windom-mn.com/

Windom is a city in and the county seat of Cottonwood County, Minnesota, United States. The population was 4,798 at the 2020 census. It is the county seat of Cottonwood County and is situated in the Coteau des Prairies.

Although a mostly small, rural farming community, Windom is host to several parks including a disc golf course at Mayflower Park. The Des Moines River flows through Windom and serves as a gentle, rapid-free canoeing spot.

== History ==
Windom was platted on June 20, 1871, by A.L. Beach, an engineer for the Sioux City and St. Paul Railroad. Twelve lots were created and sold for $100 on the first day. It was incorporated as a village in 1875 and reincorporated on September 9, 1884. Judson W. Bishop named the city after William Windom, who served as a United States senator from Minnesota from 1881 to 1883 and was United States Secretary of the Treasury under Presidents James Garfield, Chester Arthur and Benjamin Harrison.

== Geography ==
Windom lies 1,362 feet (415 m) above sea level. According to the United States Census Bureau, the city has a total area of 4.33 square miles (11.21 km^{2}), of which 4.16 square miles (10.77 km^{2}) is land and 0.17 square miles (0.44 km^{2}) is water. Windom is on the Coteau des Prairies, a ridge extending from South Dakota to Iowa separating Cottonwood County into two watersheds. The watersheds drain into the Minnesota and Mississippi rivers. The Des Moines River flows through Windom.

=== Climate ===
The record high in Windom was set on August 1, 1988, at 105 °F (41 °C). The record low was set on January 7, 1988, at −36 °F (−38 °C). The maximum precipitation was 8.84 inches (225 mm), on September 23, 2010.

Climate data for Windom, Minnesota, 1991–2020 normals, extremes 1905–present
Month	Jan	Feb	Mar	Apr	May	Jun	Jul	Aug	Sep	Oct	Nov	Dec	Year
Record high °F (°C)	65 (18)	67 (19)	85 (29)	94 (34)	100 (38)	103 (39)	104 (40)	105 (41)	100 (38)	93 (34)	81 (27)	67 (19)	105 (41)
Mean maximum °F (°C)	43.8 (6.6)	49.1 (9.5)	66.9 (19.4)	81.1 (27.3)	88.6 (31.4)	92.7 (33.7)	93.3 (34.1)	91.1 (32.8)	88.6 (31.4)	81.9 (27.7)	64.4 (18.0)	47.7 (8.7)	95.7 (35.4)
Mean daily maximum °F (°C)	26.6 (−3.0)	31.8 (−0.1)	43.5 (6.4)	59.7 (15.4)	72.1 (22.3)	81.4 (27.4)	85.3 (29.6)	82.2 (27.9)	74.5 (23.6)	61.0 (16.1)	43.2 (6.2)	29.4 (−1.4)	57.6 (14.2)
Daily mean °F (°C)	17.0 (−8.3)	21.9 (−5.6)	33.5 (0.8)	47.3 (8.5)	59.4 (15.2)	69.3 (20.7)	73.5 (23.1)	70.8 (21.6)	62.2 (16.8)	49.2 (9.6)	33.6 (0.9)	20.2 (−6.6)	46.5 (8.1)
Mean daily minimum °F (°C)	7.3 (−13.7)	11.9 (−11.2)	23.5 (−4.7)	34.9 (1.6)	46.7 (8.2)	57.2 (14.0)	61.7 (16.5)	59.3 (15.2)	49.9 (9.9)	37.3 (2.9)	24.1 (−4.4)	11.0 (−11.7)	35.4 (1.9)
Mean minimum °F (°C)	−15.5 (−26.4)	−10.4 (−23.6)	−2.0 (−18.9)	18.3 (−7.6)	31.8 (−0.1)	44.9 (7.2)	50.7 (10.4)	48.0 (8.9)	34.2 (1.2)	20.3 (−6.5)	5.1 (−14.9)	−9.4 (−23.0)	−18.5 (−28.1)
Record low °F (°C)	−36 (−38)	−32 (−36)	−30 (−34)	6 (−14)	20 (−7)	30 (−1)	41 (5)	30 (−1)	18 (−8)	6 (−14)	−17 (−27)	−30 (−34)	−36 (−38)
Average precipitation inches (mm)	0.90 (23)	0.71 (18)	1.97 (50)	3.24 (82)	3.55 (90)	4.56 (116)	4.05 (103)	3.52 (89)	3.29 (84)	2.18 (55)	1.67 (42)	0.98 (25)	30.62 (777)
Average snowfall inches (cm)	8.4 (21)	7.0 (18)	8.6 (22)	3.4 (8.6)	0.0 (0.0)	0.0 (0.0)	0.0 (0.0)	0.0 (0.0)	0.0 (0.0)	0.7 (1.8)	6.0 (15)	8.9 (23)	43.0 (109)
Average extreme snow depth inches (cm)	10.3 (26)	10.1 (26)	8.6 (22)	2.4 (6.1)	0.0 (0.0)	0.0 (0.0)	0.0 (0.0)	0.0 (0.0)	0.0 (0.0)	0.3 (0.76)	3.3 (8.4)	6.5 (17)	14.1 (36)
Average precipitation days (≥ 0.01 in)	7.1	6.0	8.2	9.7	10.9	11.3	10.0	8.6	9.2	8.0	7.2	6.8	103.0
Average snowy days (≥ 0.1 in)	5.3	4.6	3.4	1.6	0.0	0.0	0.0	0.0	0.0	0.5	3.3	5.0	23.7
Source 1: NOAA
Source 2: National Weather Service

== Demographics ==
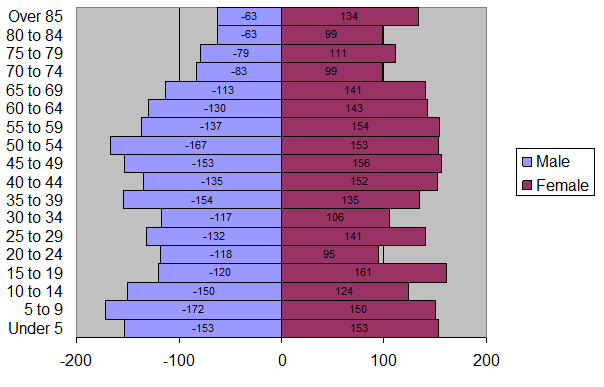
2010 Age distribution census data

Historical population
Census	Pop.	Note	%±
1880	443		—
1890	835		88.5%
1900	1,944		132.8%
1910	1,749		−10.0%
1920	2,123		21.4%
1930	2,123		0.0%
1940	2,807		32.2%
1950	3,165		12.8%
1960	3,691		16.6%
1970	3,952		7.1%
1980	4,666		18.1%
1990	4,283		−8.2%
2000	4,490		4.8%
2010	4,646		3.5%
2020	4,798		3.3%
2022 (est.)	4,742		−1.2%
U.S. Decennial Census; 2020 Census

=== 2020 census ===
As of the 2020 census, Windom had a population of 4,798. The median age was 40.2 years. 24.9% of residents were under the age of 18 and 21.4% of residents were 65 years of age or older. For every 100 females there were 94.6 males, and for every 100 females age 18 and over there were 91.8 males age 18 and over.

0.0% of residents lived in urban areas, while 100.0% lived in rural areas.

There were 1,963 households in Windom, of which 28.1% had children under the age of 18 living in them. Of all households, 43.1% were married-couple households, 19.9% were households with a male householder and no spouse or partner present, and 29.6% were households with a female householder and no spouse or partner present. About 36.4% of all households were made up of individuals and 15.8% had someone living alone who was 65 years of age or older.

There were 2,125 housing units, of which 7.6% were vacant. The homeowner vacancy rate was 2.7% and the rental vacancy rate was 5.5%.

Racial composition as of the 2020 census
Race	Number	Percent
White	3,734	77.8%
Black or African American	121	2.5%
American Indian and Alaska Native	37	0.8%
Asian	83	1.7%
Native Hawaiian and Other Pacific Islander	67	1.4%
Some other race	428	8.9%
Two or more races	328	6.8%
Hispanic or Latino (of any race)	714	14.9%

=== 2010 census ===
As of the census of 2010, there were 4,646 people, 1,994 households, and 1,201 families residing in the city. The population density was 1,116.8 inhabitants per square mile (431.2/km^{2}). There were 2,171 housing units at an average density of 521.9 per square mile (201.5/km^{2}). The racial makeup of the city was 92.1% White, 1.4% African American, 0.3% Native American, 1.2% Asian, 0.3% Pacific Islander, 3.7% from other races, and 1.1% from two or more races. Hispanic or Latino of any race were 8.0% of the population.

There were 1,994 households, of which 26.9% had children under the age of 18 living with them, 47.4% were married couples living together, 9.4% had a female householder with no husband present, 3.5% had a male householder with no wife present, and 39.8% were non-families. 35.7% of all households were made up of individuals, and 16.3% had someone living alone who was 65 years of age or older. The average household size was 2.25 and the average family size was 2.91.

The median age in the city was 42.6 years. 23.2% of residents were under the age of 18; 6.8% were between the ages of 18 and 24; 23.1% were from 25 to 44; 25.8% were from 45 to 64; and 21.2% were 65 years of age or older. The gender makeup of the city was 48.2% male and 51.8% female.

=== 2000 census ===
As of the census of 2000, there were 4,490 people, 1,910 households, and 1,195 families residing in the city. The population density was 1,263.6 inhabitants per square mile (487.9/km^{2}). There were 2,089 housing units at an average density of 587.9 per square mile (227.0/km^{2}). The racial makeup of the city was 97.15% White, 0.24% African American, 0.33% Native American, 0.71% Asian, 0.11% Pacific Islander, 0.85% from other races, and 0.60% from two or more races. Hispanic or Latino of any race were 1.58% of the population.

There were 1,910 households, out of which 27.7% had children under the age of 18 living with them, 50.6% were married couples living together, 8.9% had a female householder with no husband present, and 37.4% were non-families. 34.0% of all households were made up of individuals, and 17.2% had someone living alone who was 65 years of age or older. The average household size was 2.25 and the average family size was 2.87.

In the city, the population was spread out, with 23.7% under the age of 18, 6.6% from 18 to 24, 24.4% from 25 to 44, 23.6% from 45 to 64, and 21.7% who were 65 years of age or older. The median age was 42 years. For every 100 females, there were 87.6 males. For every 100 females age 18 and over, there were 84.7 males.

The median income for a household in the city was $30,744, and the median income for a family was $43,350. Males had a median income of $30,053 versus $21,270 for females. The per capita income for the city was $17,155. About 5.7% of families and 9.6% of the population were below the poverty line, including 13.1% of those under age 18 and 11.0% of those age 65 or over.

== Government ==
Windom is in Minnesota's 7th congressional district, represented by Michelle Fischbach, a Republican. At the state level, Windom is in Senate District 22, represented by Republican Bill Weber, and in House District 22B, represented by Republican Rod Hamilton.

Windom operates under a Mayor-Council plan. The council consists of 5 members representing two wards that are each separated into two precincts. Four of the council members represent an individual precinct and serve four-year terms; the fifth is an at-large candidate and serves a two-year term. Before a new city charter was introduced on June 20, 1984, council members in Windom were called alderpersons.

The current mayor of Windom is Hilary Mathis.

== Infrastructure ==
=== Transportation ===
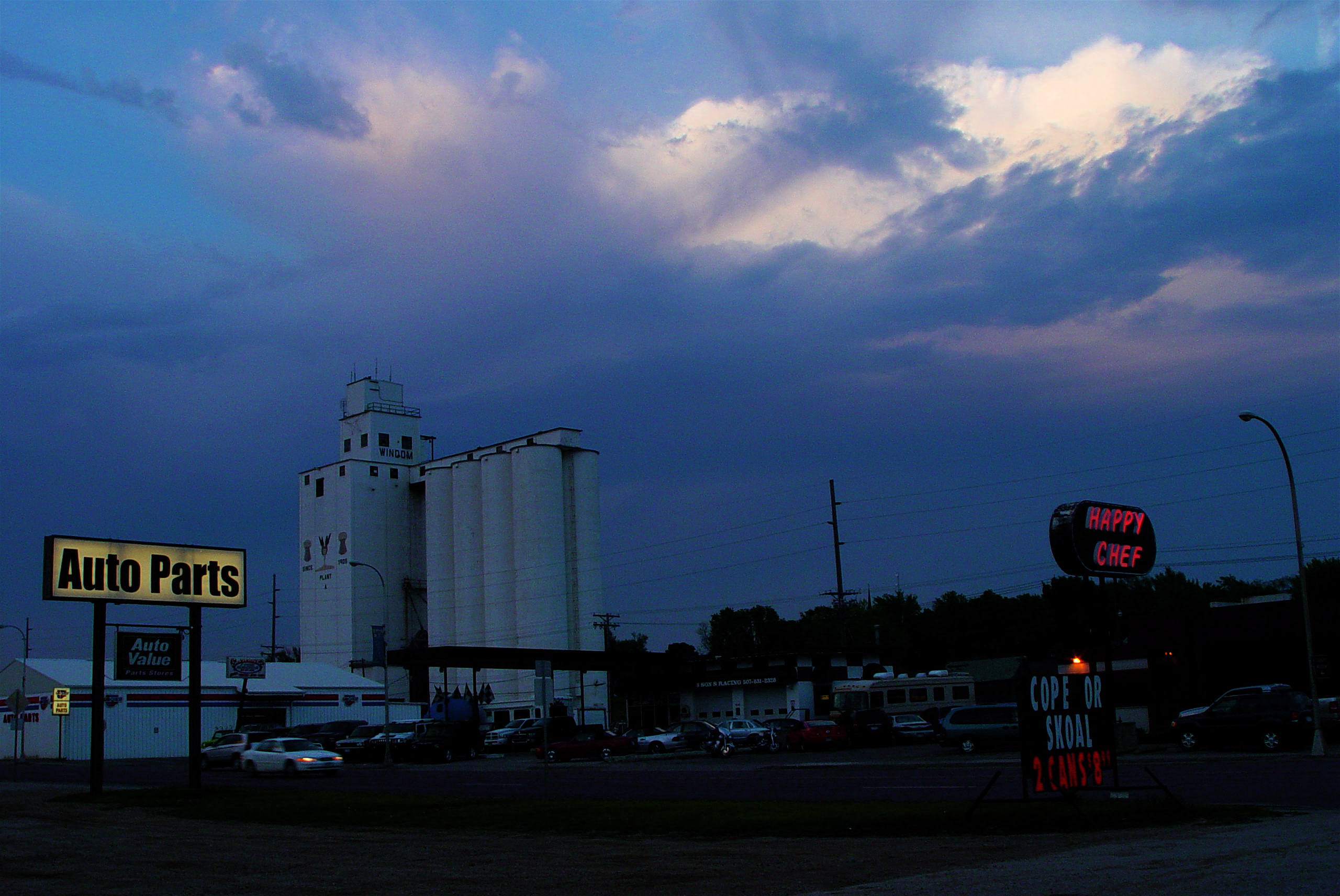
A view of Minnesota State Highway 60 as it passes through Windom.

U.S. Highway 71, Minnesota Highway 60, and Minnesota Highway 62 are three of the main routes through the city.

== Economy ==
On December 1, 1987, Windom adopted the Minnesota "Star City" program to promote economic development and pursue the "Star City" designation. The city received the designation in August 1988.

Windom's largest employers are Toro, Windom Public Schools-ISD 177, and Fortune Transportation with 600, 176, and 175 employees respectively. Windom is home to one of eight Toro manufacturing facilities. It is also the headquarters of Big Game Treestands.

Windom has a labor force of 2,378, of whom 2,295 are employed; 85 are unemployed, creating an unemployment rate of 3.5%. The largest industries are educational services, health care and social assistance, with 26.3% of the employed population, and manufacturing, with 18.6% of the employed population.

== Media ==
The town is served by the Cottonwood County Citizen, a weekly newspaper.

The town is also served by three radio stations licensed to the town, two commercial and one non-commercial.

Callsign	Frequency	Format	Owner	Reference
KDOM	1580	Full Service	Windom Radio Incorporated	
KDOM-FM	94.3	Country	Windom Radio Incorporated	
KJWR	90.9	Religious	Minn-Iowa Christian Broadcasting Inc.	
KRLP-FM	88.1	Contemporary Christian	K-LOVE, Inc.	

== Education ==
Windom is home to several schools: Windom Area Middle/High School, Windom Area Elementary, Bridges Preschool and Red Rock Ridge ALC. It also has two private or church preschools: Busy Bees and Sunshine School.

=== Windom Area Middle/High School ===
Windom Area Middle/High School is the main Middle/Highschool in Windom, MN. Windom Area Middle/High School was home to students grade 4-12 due to renovations in 2003. The building originally only housed grades 5–12 after the renovations, but had to accommodate 4th-grade students starting in 2011 due to overcrowding in the elementary school building. Now it houses 5-12 again starting in 2020. Roughly 300 students attend the high school (grades 9–12) and 350 attend the middle school (grades 5–8). The school is led by Principal Bryan Joyce and Superintendent Jamie Frank.

== Entertainment ==
=== Riverfest ===
Windom holds an annual summer festival, Riverfest, during the second weekend of June. A pageant crowns a Miss Riverfest, a First Runner-Up, Miss Photogenic, Miss Congeniality and a Little Miss Riverfest. Other activities include fireworks, Vickie Schendel 5K Walk/Run, tennis tourney, fishing tourney, turtle races, kiddie tractor pull, street dance, and a grand parade.

=== Winter-River-Fest ===
In February 2011 Windom started a new festival, "Winter-River-Fest." Activities included a chili feed, open fires, dodgeball, snow sculpting, and the Darn Cold Croquet Contest.

== Notable people ==
- Larry Buhler - Professional football player
- Shorty Elness - Professional football player
- Dennis C. Frederickson - businessman and Minnesota state legislator
- Elaine Harder - Minnesota state legislator
- Aaron Horkey - Artist
- Johnny Olson - Game show announcer
- Maria Schneider - Grammy Award-winning jazz composer
