= Portland (community), Dodge County, Wisconsin =

Portland, Wisconsin
- Unincorporated community
- Location within Wisconsin Location within the United States
- Coordinates: 43°11′56″N 88°58′29″W
- Country: United States
- State: Wisconsin
- Counties: Dodge and Jefferson
- Towns: Portland and Waterloo
- Elevation: 810 ft (250 m)
- Time zone: UTC-6 (Central (CST))
  - Summer (DST): UTC-5 (CDT)
- Area code: 608
- GNIS feature ID: 1571810

Portland is an unincorporated community located partially in the town of Portland in Dodge County, Wisconsin and partially in the town of Waterloo in Jefferson County, Wisconsin, United States.
