= Portland, Dodge County, Wisconsin =

Portland, Wisconsin
- Town
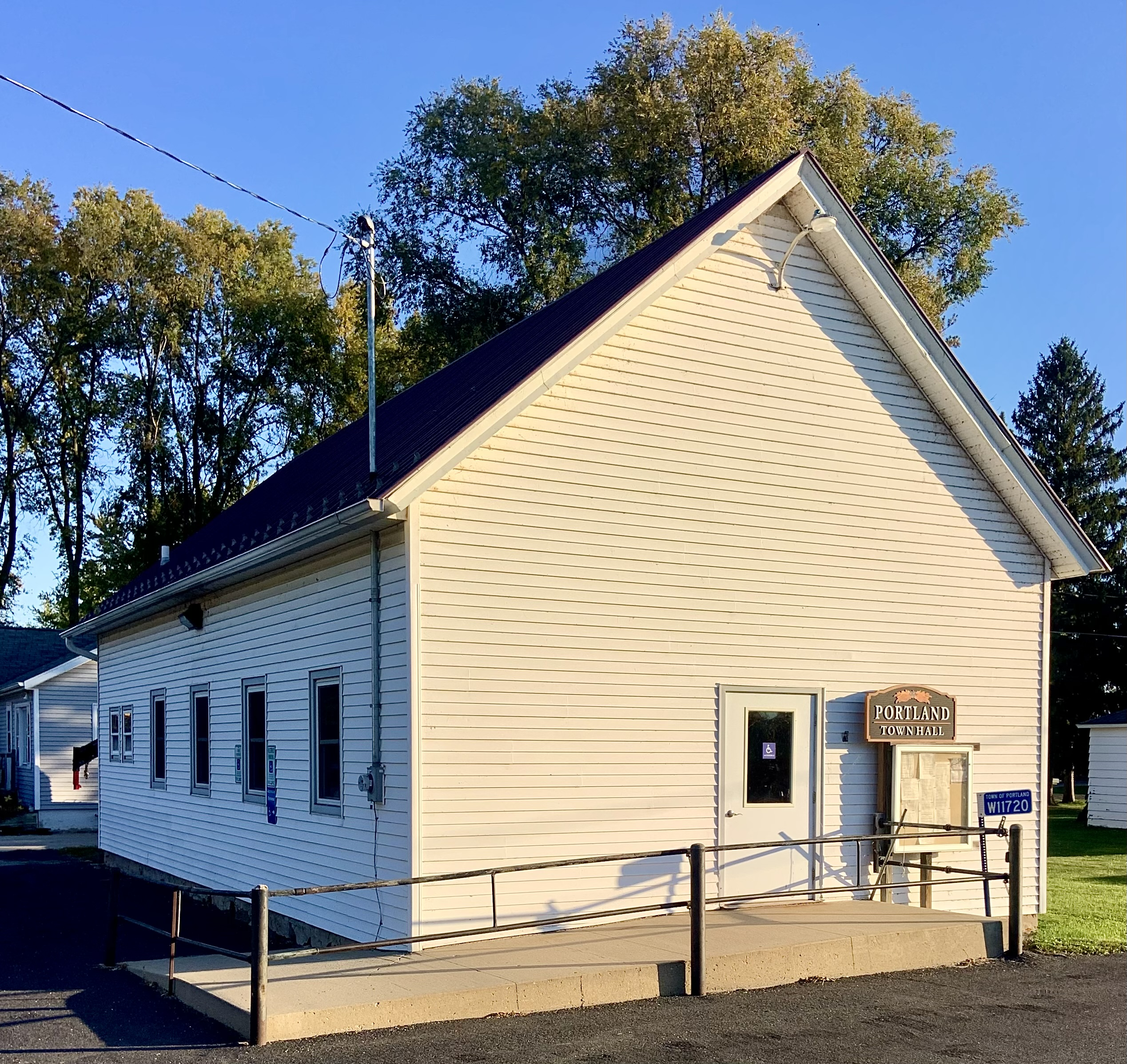
- Town hall

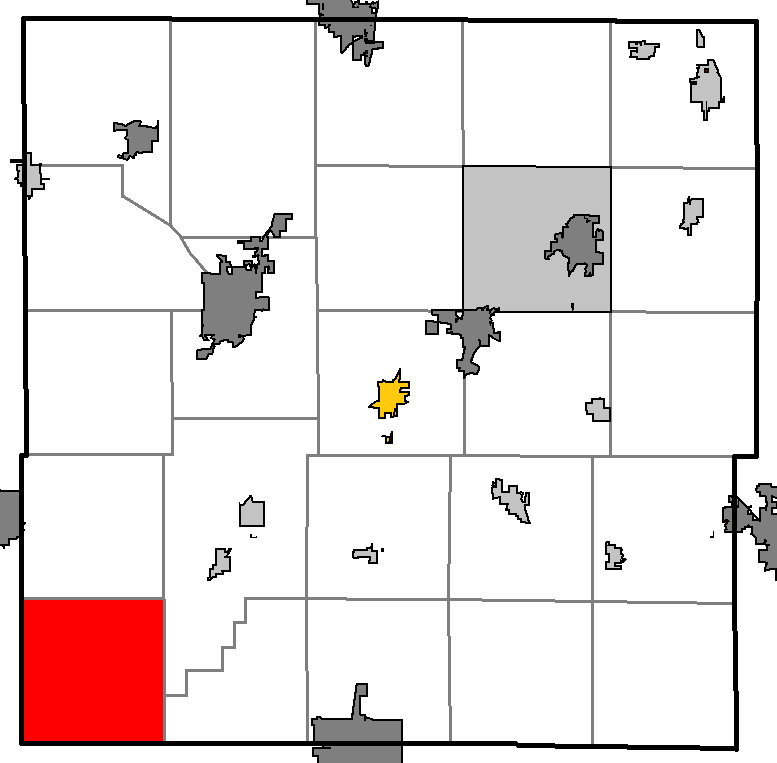
- Location of Portland, within Dodge County
- Coordinates: 43°13′44″N 88°57′13″W
- Country: United States
- State: Wisconsin
- County: Dodge

Area
  - Total: 35.7 sq mi (92.4 km^{2})
  - Land: 35.3 sq mi (91.5 km^{2})
  - Water: 0.35 sq mi (0.9 km^{2})
- Elevation: 863 ft (263 m)

Population (2020)
  - Total: 1,091
  - Density: 30.9/sq mi (11.9/km^{2})
- Time zone: UTC-6 (Central (CST))
  - Summer (DST): UTC-5 (CDT)
- FIPS code: 55-64375
- GNIS feature ID: 1583958
- Website: https://www.townofportlandwi.org/

Portland is a town in Dodge County, Wisconsin, United States. The population was 1,091 at the 2020 census. The unincorporated community of Portland is located partially in the town.

== Geography ==
According to the United States Census Bureau, the town has a total area of 35.7 square miles (92.4 km^{2}), of which 35.3 square miles (91.5 km^{2}) is land and 0.4 square mile (0.9 km^{2}) (1.01%) is water.

== Demographics ==
As of the census of 2000, there were 1,106 people, 396 households, and 306 families living in the town. The population density was 31.3 people per square mile (12.1/km^{2}). There were 421 housing units at an average density of 11.9 per square mile (4.6/km^{2}). The racial makeup of the town was 94.58% White, 2.53% African American, 0.81% Native American, 0.45% Pacific Islander, 1.08% from other races, and 0.54% from two or more races. Hispanic or Latino of any race were 2.26% of the population.

There were 396 households, out of which 36.4% had children under the age of 18 living with them, 68.7% were married couples living together, 4.3% had a female householder with no husband present, and 22.5% were non-families. 15.7% of all households were made up of individuals, and 6.1% had someone living alone who was 65 years of age or older. The average household size was 2.79 and the average family size was 3.12.

In the town, the population was spread out, with 27.8% under the age of 18, 6.5% from 18 to 24, 33.3% from 25 to 44, 22.4% from 45 to 64, and 9.9% who were 65 years of age or older. The median age was 37 years. For every 100 females, there were 111.9 males. For every 100 females age 18 and over, there were 106.2 males.

The median income for a household in the town was $49,881, and the median income for a family was $53,167. Males had a median income of $34,922 versus $26,875 for females. The per capita income for the town was $19,070. About 2.9% of families and 5.7% of the population were below the poverty line, including 6.8% of those under age 18 and 1.9% of those age 65 or over.

== Notable people ==
- Henry William Stokes, farmer and politician, was born in the town
