= Sentral Community School District =

Former school district in Iowa

Sentral Community School District was a school district headquartered in Fenton, Iowa. It served the communities of Fenton, Lone Rock and Seneca. The spelling "Sentral" was deliberately adopted to be a reference to "Seneca" and to differentiate itself from various other school systems using the word "Central". As of 2004 the district had around 300 students. Their mascot was known as the "Spartans" and before that the "Satellites".

== History ==
Initially the district had separate K-12 schools in Fenton, Lone Rock and Seneca. The Satellite mascot for the consolidated secondary school was chosen in 1957 and the school itself first opened on land between Fenton and Lone Rock in 1959.

In 2008, the Sentral district began a grade-sharing arrangement with the North Kossuth Community School District, resulting in a new North Sentral Kossuth High School in Swea City. Later the Armstrong–Ringsted Community School District entered into a new grade-sharing arrangement with Sentral.

In 2011 Sentral, Armstrong-Ringsted, and the North Kossuth districts were in negotiations over grade-sharing, and there was a possibility of the Sentral school being closed as a result.

On July 1, 2014, Armstrong–Ringsted merged with the Sentral district to form the North Union Community School District. The merger passed in the Armstrong–Ringsted district by 291-42 and in Sentral by 78–18, and the approval was through a total of 86% of voters in both school districts.
