= KDOM (AM) =

- Windom, Minnesota; United States
- Frequency: 1580 kHz
- Branding: KDOM radio 1580 AM 103.1 FM

Programming
- Format: Classic country
- Affiliations: ABC News Radio; Minnesota Twins

Ownership
- Owner: Steve and Laura White; (Next Step Broadcasting, Inc.)
- Sister stations: KDOM-FM

History
- First air date: 1986
- Call sign meaning: WinDOM

Technical information
- Licensing authority: FCC
- Facility ID: 72905
- Class: D
- Power: 1,000 watts day 2 watts night
- Transmitter coordinates: 43°51′41″N 95°5′50″W
- Translator: 103.1 K276GN (Windom)

Links
- Public license information: Public file; LMS
- Webcast: Listen Live
- Website: www.windomradio.com

KDOM (1580 kHz) is an AM radio station broadcasting a classic country format. Licensed to Windom, Minnesota, United States. The station is currently owned by Steve and Laura White, through licensee Next Step Broadcasting, Inc.

1580 AM is a Canadian clear-channel frequency, on which CKDO is the dominant Class A station.
