= William H. Mellen =

American politician (1829–1907)

Member of the Minnesota House of Representatives from the 38th district
- In office January 4, 1876 – January 1, 1877

Personal details
- Born: 1829 New York, U.S.
- Died: 1907 (aged 77–78)
- Occupation: Politician, farmer

William H. "W.H." Mellen (1829–1907) was an American politician and farmer who served in the Minnesota House of Representatives from 1876 to 1877, representing the 38th legislative district of Minnesota in the 18th Minnesota Legislature.

== Early life ==
Mellen was born in New York in 1829.

== Career ==
Mellen served in the Minnesota House of Representatives from 1876 to 1877, representing the 38th legislative district of Minnesota in the 18th Minnesota Legislature.

During his time in office, Mellen served on the following committees:

- Mines and Minerals
- Railroads

Mellen's tenure began on January 4, 1876, and concluded on January 1, 1877. His district included representation for the counties of Cottonwood, Jackson, Murray, Nobles, Pipestone, and Rock.

Outside of the Minnesota Legislature, Mellen was a farmer.

== Personal life and death ==
Mellen came to Minnesota in 1866. He resided in Currie, Minnesota.

Mellen died in 1907.

Minnesota House of Representatives
Preceded by —	Member of the Minnesota House of Representatives from the 38th district 1876–1877	Succeeded by —
