= KDOM-FM =

- Windom, Minnesota; United States
- Frequency: 94.3 MHz
- Branding: HOT COUNTRY 94.3

Programming
- Format: Country

Ownership
- Owner: Steve and Laura White; (Next Step Broadcasting, Inc.)
- Sister stations: KDOM

History
- First air date: 1961
- Call sign meaning: WinDOM

Technical information
- Licensing authority: FCC
- Facility ID: 72906
- Class: A
- ERP: 5,700 watts
- HAAT: 102.0 meters (334.6 ft)
- Transmitter coordinates: 43°53′6.00″N 95°10′56.00″W

Links
- Public license information: Public file; LMS
- Webcast: Listen Live
- Website: www.windomradio.com

KDOM-FM (94.3 MHz) is a radio station broadcasting a country music format licensed to Windom, Minnesota, United States. The station is currently owned by Steve and Laura White, through licensee Next Step Broadcasting, Inc.
