= Swea City, Iowa =

- City
- Location of Swea City, Iowa
- Coordinates: 43°23′1″N 94°18′37″W
- Country: USA
- State: Iowa
- County: Kossuth

Area
  - Total: 0.77 sq mi (1.99 km^{2})
  - Land: 0.77 sq mi (1.99 km^{2})
  - Water: 0 sq mi (0.00 km^{2})
- Elevation: 1,178 ft (359 m)

Population (2020)
  - Total: 566
  - Density: 738.3/sq mi (285.04/km^{2})
- Time zone: UTC-6 (Central (CST))
  - Summer (DST): UTC-5 (CDT)
- ZIP code: 50590
- Area code: 515
- FIPS code: 19-76755
- GNIS feature ID: 2396015

Swea City is a city in Kossuth County, Iowa, United States. The population was 566 at the time of the 2020 census.

== History ==
Swea City was platted in 1892; it was then called Reynolds. In February 1893, the name was officially changed to Swea City. Swea City was petitioned for incorporation on December 11, 1894 with a population of 161. Several objections were filed with the reasons for objection listed as, "One, the judges of the election administered the oath to themselves swearing in each other; and Two, the words 'for incorporation' were written on one ballot while 'against corporation' was written on another ballot." It was implied that the choice needed to be available on a single ballot in order to be valid. Later a second petition was filed this time on April 19, 1895 and the election was held at a schoolhouse. Each ballot had "For incorporation" and "Against incorporation" printed on them. The vote was 34 in favor of incorporation and 1 against, and the city was incorporated.

== Geography ==
According to the United States Census Bureau, the city has a total area of 0.74 square miles (1.92 km^{2}), all land.

=== Climate ===
According to the Köppen Climate Classification system, Swea City has a hot-summer humid continental climate, abbreviated "Dfa" on climate maps.

Climate data for Swea City, Iowa, 1991–2020 normals, extremes 1954–present
Month	Jan	Feb	Mar	Apr	May	Jun	Jul	Aug	Sep	Oct	Nov	Dec	Year
Record high °F (°C)	58 (14)	69 (21)	86 (30)	93 (34)	104 (40)	105 (41)	104 (40)	101 (38)	98 (37)	94 (34)	81 (27)	69 (21)	105 (41)
Mean maximum °F (°C)	42.4 (5.8)	47.5 (8.6)	66.7 (19.3)	81.4 (27.4)	89.4 (31.9)	92.8 (33.8)	92.4 (33.6)	89.7 (32.1)	88.5 (31.4)	82.8 (28.2)	66.0 (18.9)	47.7 (8.7)	95.4 (35.2)
Mean daily maximum °F (°C)	21.9 (−5.6)	26.9 (−2.8)	39.7 (4.3)	55.4 (13.0)	67.7 (19.8)	77.8 (25.4)	80.8 (27.1)	78.3 (25.7)	72.6 (22.6)	58.7 (14.8)	41.9 (5.5)	27.6 (−2.4)	54.1 (12.3)
Daily mean °F (°C)	13.2 (−10.4)	17.5 (−8.1)	30.5 (−0.8)	43.9 (6.6)	56.6 (13.7)	67.3 (19.6)	70.3 (21.3)	67.9 (19.9)	60.3 (15.7)	46.9 (8.3)	32.0 (0.0)	19.4 (−7.0)	43.8 (6.6)
Mean daily minimum °F (°C)	4.5 (−15.3)	8.1 (−13.3)	21.4 (−5.9)	32.5 (0.3)	45.6 (7.6)	56.9 (13.8)	59.8 (15.4)	57.5 (14.2)	48.0 (8.9)	35.2 (1.8)	22.1 (−5.5)	11.2 (−11.6)	33.6 (0.9)
Mean minimum °F (°C)	−15.3 (−26.3)	−10.3 (−23.5)	−1.2 (−18.4)	20.1 (−6.6)	33.3 (0.7)	47.2 (8.4)	50.1 (10.1)	47.9 (8.8)	34.1 (1.2)	20.3 (−6.5)	5.3 (−14.8)	−9.3 (−22.9)	−18.2 (−27.9)
Record low °F (°C)	−32 (−36)	−28 (−33)	−20 (−29)	0 (−18)	10 (−12)	35 (2)	43 (6)	38 (3)	22 (−6)	6 (−14)	−16 (−27)	−28 (−33)	−32 (−36)
Average precipitation inches (mm)	0.87 (22)	0.93 (24)	1.76 (45)	3.43 (87)	4.60 (117)	4.65 (118)	4.16 (106)	4.11 (104)	3.21 (82)	2.52 (64)	1.46 (37)	1.17 (30)	32.87 (836)
Average snowfall inches (cm)	10.9 (28)	8.5 (22)	4.6 (12)	3.6 (9.1)	0.0 (0.0)	0.0 (0.0)	0.0 (0.0)	0.0 (0.0)	0.0 (0.0)	0.7 (1.8)	3.1 (7.9)	8.3 (21)	39.7 (101.8)
Average precipitation days (≥ 0.01 in)	5.7	5.1	6.7	9.8	12.4	10.9	8.5	7.6	7.6	7.1	5.6	6.0	93
Average snowy days (≥ 0.1 in)	6.1	4.2	3.0	1.2	0.0	0.0	0.0	0.0	0.0	0.4	2.6	5.6	23.1
Source 1: NOAA
Source 2: National Weather Service

== Demographics ==
Historical populations
Year	Pop.	±%
1900	322	—
1910	402	+24.8%
1920	691	+71.9%
1930	695	+0.6%
1940	735	+5.8%
1950	869	+18.2%
1960	805	−7.4%
1970	774	−3.9%
1980	813	+5.0%
1990	634	−22.0%
2000	642	+1.3%
2010	536	−16.5%
2020	566	+5.6%
Source:"U.S. Census website". United States Census Bureau. and Iowa Data Center; Source: U.S. Decennial Census

=== 2020 census ===
As of the census of 2020, there were 566 people, 257 households, and 133 families residing in the city. The population density was 741.9 inhabitants per square mile (286.4/km^{2}). There were 309 housing units at an average density of 405.0 per square mile (156.4/km^{2}). The racial makeup of the city was 92.4% White, 0.0% Black or African American, 0.5% Native American, 0.0% Asian, 0.0% Pacific Islander, 3.2% from other races and 3.9% from two or more races. Hispanic or Latino persons of any race comprised 5.7% of the population.

Of the 257 households, 21.4% of which had children under the age of 18 living with them, 38.5% were married couples living together, 7.4% were cohabitating couples, 29.2% had a female householder with no spouse or partner present and 24.9% had a male householder with no spouse or partner present. 48.2% of all households were non-families. 42.0% of all households were made up of individuals, 20.2% had someone living alone who was 65 years old or older.

The median age in the city was 45.7 years. 24.2% of the residents were under the age of 20; 4.2% were between the ages of 20 and 24; 21.2% were from 25 and 44; 26.0% were from 45 and 64; and 24.4% were 65 years of age or older. The gender makeup of the city was 48.6% male and 51.4% female.

=== 2010 census ===
As of the census of 2010, there were 536 people, 258 households, and 147 families living in the city. The population density was 724.3 inhabitants per square mile (279.7/km^{2}). There were 314 housing units at an average density of 424.3 per square mile (163.8/km^{2}). The racial makeup of the city was 98.5% White, 0.9% African American, 0.4% from other races, and 0.2% from two or more races. Hispanic or Latino of any race were 0.6% of the population.

There were 258 households, of which 22.5% had children under the age of 18 living with them, 45.0% were married couples living together, 9.3% had a female householder with no husband present, 2.7% had a male householder with no wife present, and 43.0% were non-families. 38.4% of all households were made up of individuals, and 16.7% had someone living alone who was 65 years of age or older. The average household size was 2.08 and the average family size was 2.72.

The median age in the city was 48.4 years. 21.6% of residents were under the age of 18; 7.1% were between the ages of 18 and 24; 16.4% were from 25 to 44; 30.8% were from 45 to 64; and 24.1% were 65 years of age or older. The gender makeup of the city was 47.6% male and 52.4% female.

=== 2000 census ===
As of the census of 2000, there were 642 people, 292 households, and 176 families living in the city. The population density was 871.5 inhabitants per square mile (336.5/km^{2}). There were 330 housing units at an average density of 448.0 per square mile (173.0/km^{2}). The racial makeup of the city was 97.35% White, 0.16% Asian, 1.71% from other races, and 0.78% from two or more races. Hispanic or Latino of any race were 2.65% of the population.

There were 292 households, out of which 24.3% had children under the age of 18 living with them, 51.7% were married couples living together, 6.5% had a female householder with no husband present, and 39.4% were non-families. 36.6% of all households were made up of individuals, and 20.2% had someone living alone who was 65 years of age or older. The average household size was 2.20 and the average family size was 2.86.

In the city, the population was spread out, with 23.2% under the age of 18, 5.8% from 18 to 24, 23.8% from 25 to 44, 22.0% from 45 to 64, and 25.2% who were 65 years of age or older. The median age was 43 years. For every 100 females, there were 89.9 males. For every 100 females age 18 and over, there were 92.6 males.

The median income for a household in the city was $28,250, and the median income for a family was $40,417. Males had a median income of $29,444 versus $21,765 for females. The per capita income for the city was $14,937. About 5.3% of families and 12.9% of the population were below the poverty line, including 17.5% of those under age 18 and 9.1% of those age 65 or over.

== Education ==
Swea City is a part of the North Kossuth Community School District, which was formed on July 1, 1978 by the merger of the Swea City and Ledyard school districts.
