= U.S. Route 18 in Iowa =

Highway in Iowa

U.S. Highway 18
- US 18 highlighted in red

Route information
- Maintained by Iowa DOT
- Length: 311.750 mi (501.713 km)
- Existed: November 11, 1926–present
- History: Primary Road 19 from 1920–1926; National Parks Pike registered in 1920

Major junctions
- West end: US 18 near Canton, SD
- US 75 near Hull; Iowa 60 at Sheldon; US 59 at Sanborn; US 71 at Spencer; US 169 at Algona; I-35 / Iowa 27 at Clear Lake; US 218 / Iowa 27 at Charles City; US 63 at New Hampton; US 52 at Postville
- East end: US 18 / WIS 60 at McGregor

Location
- Country: United States
- State: Iowa
- Counties: Lyon; Sioux; O'Brien; Clay; Palo Alto; Kossuth; Hancock; Cerro Gordo; Floyd; Chickasaw; Fayette; Allamakee; Clayton

Highway system
- United States Numbered Highway System; List; Special; Divided; Iowa Primary Highway System; Interstate; US; State; Secondary; Scenic
← Iowa 17	→ US 20

U.S. Highway 18 (US 18) is the northernmost east–west United States Numbered Highway in the state of Iowa. As with all state highways in Iowa, it is maintained by the Iowa Department of Transportation (Iowa DOT). It enters the state by crossing the Big Sioux River between Inwood and Canton, South Dakota. It travels about 312 miles (502 km) and connects Spencer, Mason City, and Charles City. The highway leaves the state via the Marquette–Joliet Bridge over the Mississippi River at Marquette. Prior to becoming a U.S. Highway, the route US 18 follows was known as Primary Road No. 19 and the National Parks Pike.

== Route description ==
US 18 begins at the Big Sioux River approximately two miles (3.2 km) east of Canton, South Dakota. It runs easterly through rural Lyon County, in the northwestern corner of the state. At Inwood, it meets Iowa Highway 182 (Iowa 182), which provides access to Sioux Falls, South Dakota, via Iowa 9 and South Dakota Highway 42. US 18 turns south at Inwood and heads into Sioux County. The highway crosses the Rock River on its way toward Rock Valley and Hull. West of Hull, at Perkins, US 18 juts to the south along US 75 before turning east again closer to Hull. The highway continues east toward Sheldon.

As it crosses into O'Brien County on the western edge of Sheldon, US 18 intersects Iowa 60 Business (Iowa 60 Bus.). The two routes head east toward a diamond interchange with Iowa 60 on the eastern side of town where the business loop ends. The highway roughly parallels the Dakota, Minnesota and Eastern Railroad (DM&E Railroad). In Sanborn, US 18 is briefly overlapped by US 59, which joins from the north and leaves to the south. Continuing east, it passes through Hartley and then enters Clay County. North of Spencer, it intersects US 71 and the two routes head south together through town. On the south side of Spencer, the two routes come to a T intersection and each route heads in the opposite direction—US 18 to the east and US 71 to the west.

East of Spencer, US 18 passes through Ruthven in Palo Alto County. Between Ruthven and Emmetsburg, it is joined by Iowa 4 from the north. The two routes split again in Emmetsburg as Iowa 4 heads south. US 18 continues east, briefly heading south to enter Cylinder. The route curves back to the east at the DM&E Railroad line. An intersection with Iowa 15 near Whittemore marks the Palo Alto–Kossuth county line. Iowa 15 follows US 18 for one mile (1.6 km) before it splits away to the north. On the northern edge of Algona, the highway meets US 169. At the eastern county line, shared with Hancock County, is an intersection with Iowa 17, which marks that route's northern end.

In Hancock County, the route passes through Britt before meeting US 69 one mile (1.6 km) west of Garner; the two highways split in Garner. East of Garner, the route takes a north-northeasterly path as it goes through Ventura and skirts the northern shore of Clear Lake. Near the northeastern shore of the lake, it enters the city of Clear Lake, where it meets Interstate 35 (I-35). Iowa 122 and US 18 Bus. head east from the interchange with the Interstate. US 18 traffic follows southbound I-35 for four miles (6.4 km). Iowa 27, the Avenue of the Saints highway, which had hitherto followed I-35 southbound now follows US 18 eastbound. The two routes, now on a four-lane, controlled-access highway, follow a path which passes to the south of Mason City. They meet US 65 and US 18 Bus. at exit 186.

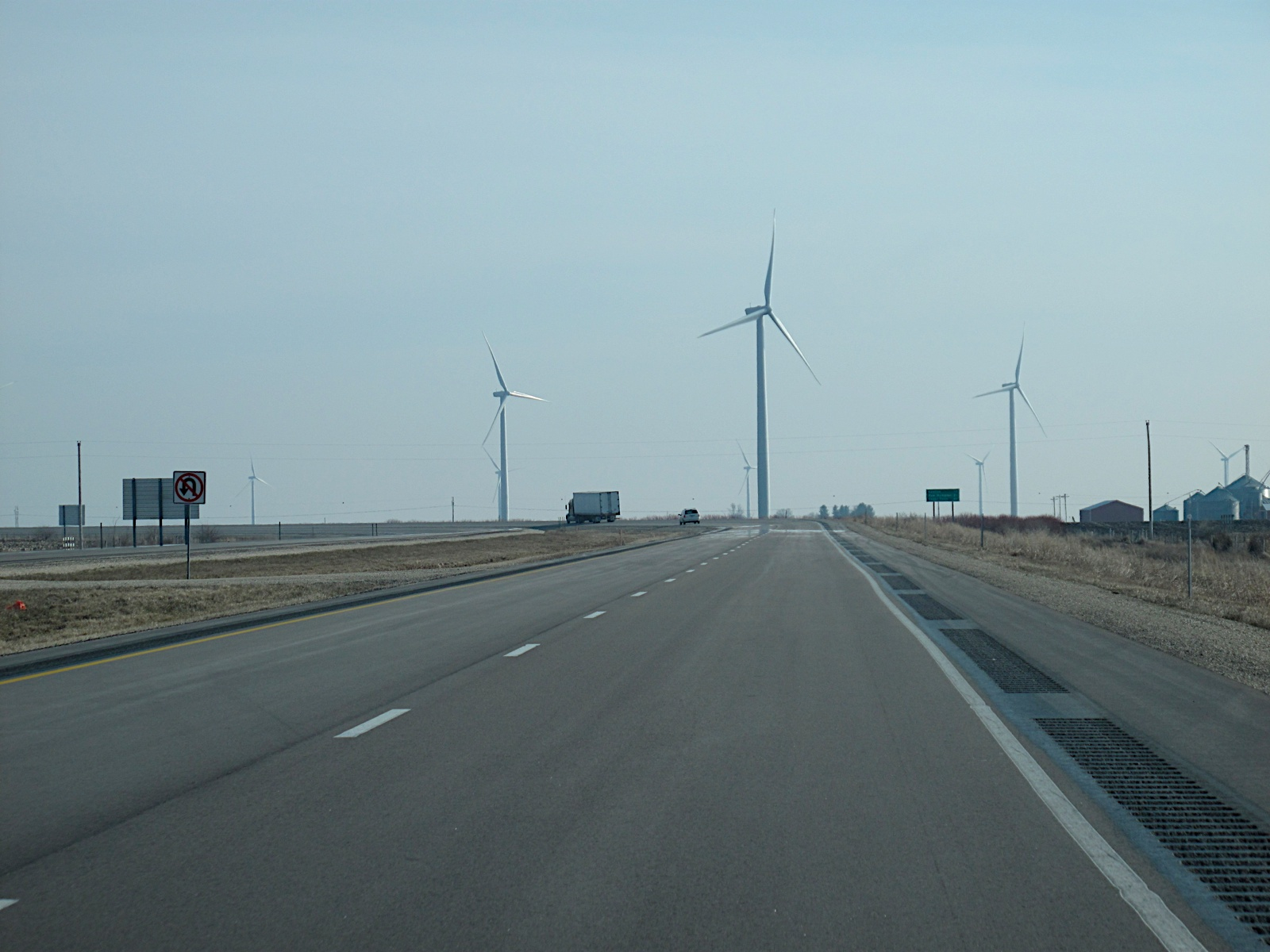
US 18/US 218/Iowa 27 pass a wind farm near Charles City

At the Floyd county line, US 18 and Iowa 27 become a limited-access road and angle slightly to the northeast, passing Rudd. At Floyd, the two routes are joined by US 218. The three routes head south along a bypass of Charles City. They intersect Iowa 14 on the western side of town and take a 90-degree curve to the east. At exit 218 of the expressway, US 18 leaves US 218 and Iowa 27, which continue southeastward toward Cedar Falls–Waterloo. US 18 briefly heads north into Charles City with US 218 Bus. The two routes meet the northern end of Iowa 14, and US 18 splits away to the east to cross the Cedar River.

Heading east again, the route enters Chickasaw County and passes through Bassett on its way to New Hampton. It meets US 63 at a four-lane bypass on the western side of town. The two routes head south for eight miles (13 km), splitting at the mile 196 interchange which is also the eastern end of Iowa 346. The route turns to travel due east through Fredericksburg.

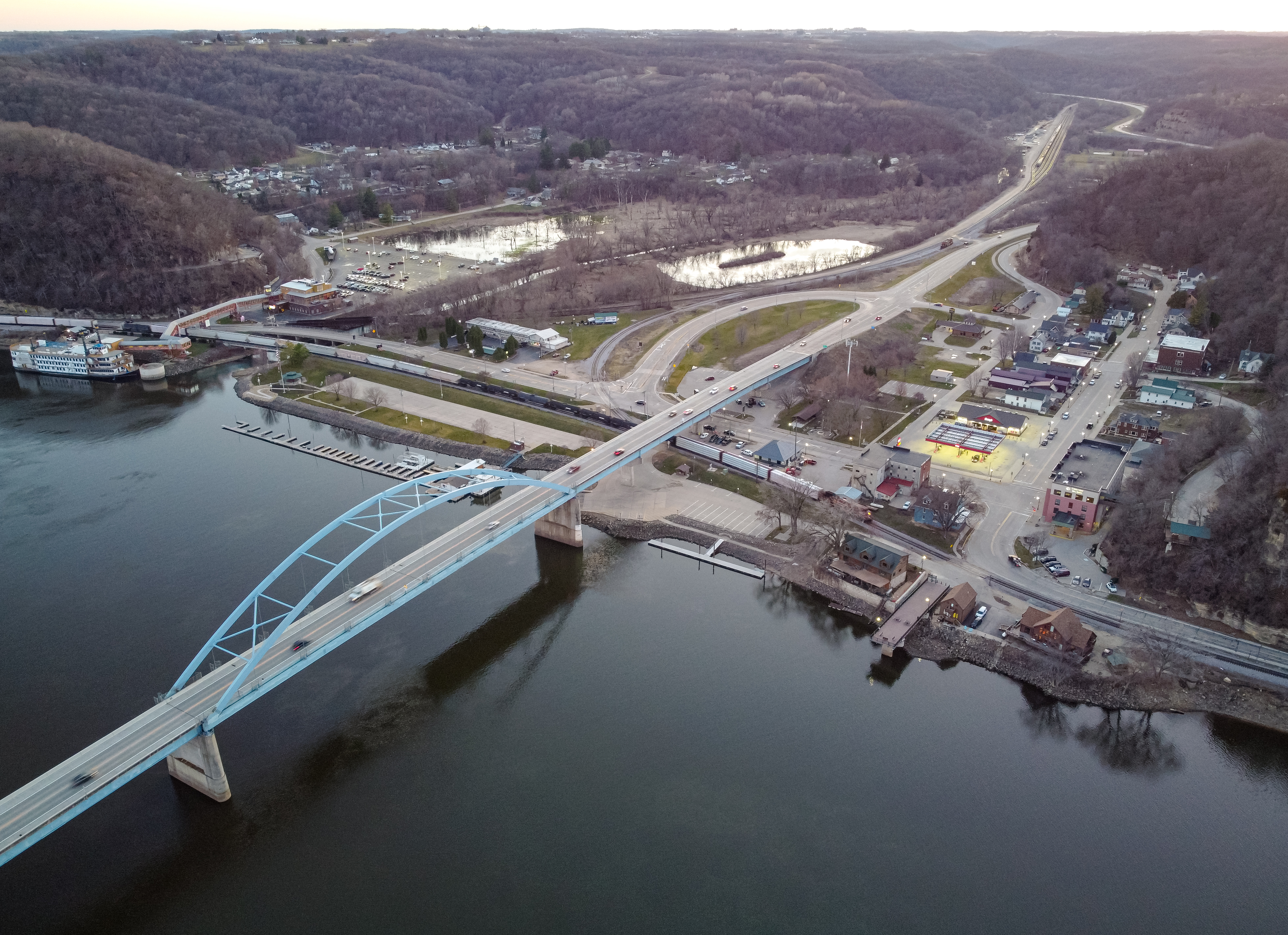
US 18 crosses into Wisconsin via the Marquette–Joliet Bridge

Continuing due east, US 18 does not enter another community for 20 miles (32 km) until it reaches West Union in Fayette County. In West Union, it intersects Iowa 150. East of town, it crosses into the Driftless Area, an area that was untouched by glaciation during the last ice age. The route turns to the northeast to through Clermont and then to the north to meet US 52 at Postville in southern Allamakee County. The two routes head east through Postville and turn south into Clayton County. Near Froelich, US 52 leaves to the south toward Dubuque. Heading to the northeast toward McGregor and Marquette, its business loop goes through the towns while the mainline skirts around them. The business loop rejoins the mainline at the foot of the Marquette–Joliet Bridge, which spans the Mississippi River. US 18 continues east into Wisconsin with State Trunk Highway 60, which begins at the state line.

== History ==
Before it and the rest of the U.S. Numbered Highway System were designated on November 11, 1926, US 18 was known by two names in the state. It was first known as Primary Road No. 19, which was assigned to the route when the Iowa State Highway Commission published its first state highway map in 1919. The route was also called the National Parks Pike, which began at Yellowstone National Park and ended in Madison, Wisconsin, encompassing all of Primary Road No. 19 in the state. The pike was registered with the on April 29, 1920. The National Parks Pike name fell into disuse after the highway became US 18.

By 1927, a significant portion of the route was paved, while the remainder was graveled. All of O'Brien County and 80 miles (130 km) between Algona and Charles City were paved. In seven years, the gap between O'Brien County and Algona was finished which created 160 miles (260 km) of continuous pavement. During those same seven years, the route from West Union to the Mississippi River and all of Primary Road No. 59, which included the seven-mile-long (11 km) overlap of US 18 near New Hampton were paved. Primary Road No. 59 is now known as US 63. By the start of World War II, the only remaining section of US 18 that was not paved was an 11-mile (18 km) section west of Rock Valley in Sioux County. That last section would not be completed for another 10 years.

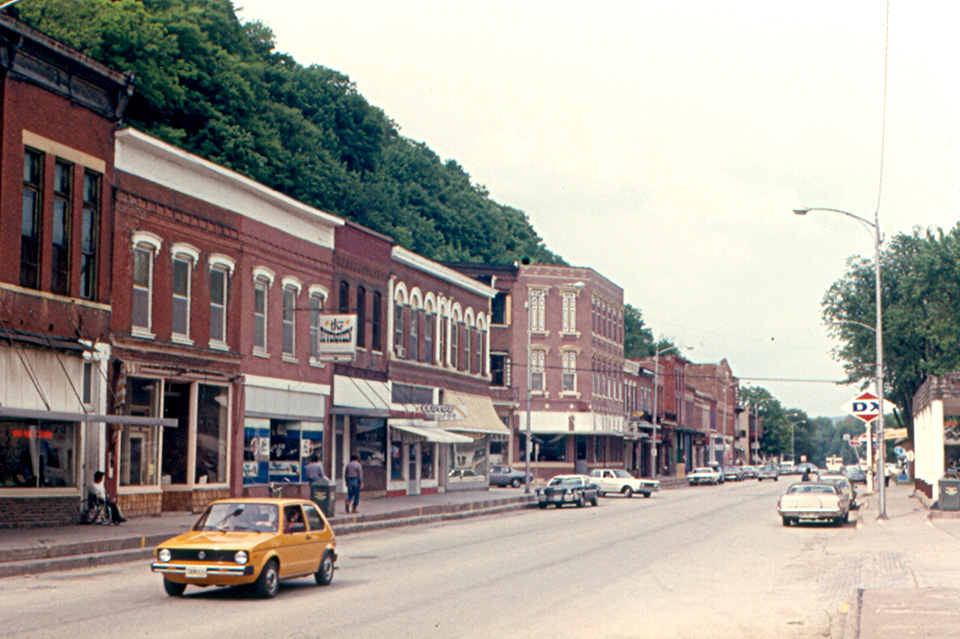
US 18 passing through McGregor in 1975

Prior to 1932, the only way vehicles traveling US 18 could cross the Mississippi River was by ferry. That changed in when identical suspension bridges were built to cross the river between Marquette and Prairie du Chien, Wisconsin. Built in 1931–1932, each bridge was 450 feet (140 m) long, crossed a main channel of the river, and were divided by a 2,000-foot-long (610 m) island causeway. The first car to cross the bridges did so on March 7, 1932. Users of the bridge had to pay a toll until July 15, 1954. The bridges remained in use for another 20 years, when they were replaced by the Marquette–Joliet Bridge. In 1988–1989, a bypass was built around McGregor so US 18 could connect directly to the Marquette–Joliet Bridge. A short road had previously provided access to and from the bridge. The old alignment of the route became US 18 Bus.

Over the late 1990s, construction began on the Avenue of the Saints corridor near Mason City. A new controlled-access facility was built south of the city east to Rudd. On December 5, 1999, this section of freeway opened and US 18 was realigned onto the new road. The old alignment became Iowa 122. By the end of the next year, the four-lane expressway was extended to Charles City. By 2003, an expressway carrying US 63 was built around New Hampton. US 18 was rerouted onto the expressway and the western end of Iowa 24 was moved to the US 63/US 18 interchange.

== Major intersections ==
County	Location	mi	km	Exit	Destinations	Notes
Big Sioux River		0.000	0.000		US 18 west – Canton	Continuation into South Dakota
Big Sioux River		0.000	0.000		South Dakota–Iowa state line	
Lyon	Inwood	4.992	8.034		Iowa 182 north to Iowa 9	
Sioux	Lincoln Township	24.853	39.997		US 75 north – Rock Rapids	Western end of US 75 overlap
Sioux	Lincoln Township	25.848	41.598		US 75 south – Sioux Center	Eastern end of US 75 overlap
O'Brien	Sheldon	42.184	67.889		Iowa 60 Business south (2nd Avenue)	Western end of Iowa 60 Business overlap
O'Brien	Sheldon	44.269	71.244		Iowa 60 / Iowa 60 Business ends – Worthington, Minn., Sioux City	Eastern end of Iowa 60 Business overlap
O'Brien	Sanborn	52.806	84.983		US 59 north – Worthington, Minn.	Western end of US 59 overlap
O'Brien	Franklin Township	53.802	86.586		US 59 south – Primghar	Eastern end of US 59 overlap
Clay	Spencer	77.770	125.159		US 71 north – Milford	Western end of US 71 overlap
Clay	Spencer	81.755	131.572		US 71 south – Storm Lake	Eastern end of US 71 overlap
Palo Alto	Highland Township	94.160	151.536		CR N20 – Ruthven	Former Iowa 341
Palo Alto	Highland Township	97.317	156.617		CR N28 – Ayrshire	Former Iowa 314
Palo Alto	Emmetsburg Township	101.306	163.036		Iowa 4 north – Graettinger	Western end of Iowa 4 overlap
Palo Alto	Emmetsburg	106.075	170.711		Iowa 4 south (Broadway Street) – Pocahontas	Eastern end of Iowa 4 overlap
Palo Alto–Kossuth county line	Fern Valley–Fairfield– Lotts Creek–Whittemore township quadripoint	119.698	192.635		Iowa 15 south – West Bend	Western end of Iowa 15 overlap
Kossuth	Lotts Creek–Whittemore township line	120.687	194.227		Iowa 15 north – Fenton	Eastern end of Iowa 15 overlap
Kossuth	Algona	130.144	209.446		US 169 – Algona, Bancroft	
Kossuth–Hancock county line	Wesley–Orthel township line	143.858	231.517		Iowa 17 south – Corwith	
Hancock	Britt	152.452	245.348		CR R35 – Crystal Lake, Kanawha	Former Iowa 111
Hancock	Britt	153.185	246.527		Diagonal Street	Former Iowa 424
Hancock	Garfield Township	160.877	258.906		US 69 north – Forest City	Western end of US 69 overlap
Hancock	Garner	161.966	260.659		US 69 south – Belmond	Eastern end of US 69 overlap
Cerro Gordo	Clear Lake	172.233	277.182		N. 8th Street	Former Iowa 107
Cerro Gordo	Clear Lake	175.352– 175.657	282.202– 282.693	194	I-35 north / Iowa 27 north – Minneapolis US 18 Bus. east / Iowa 122 east – Mason City	Western end of I-35 / Iowa 27 overlap
Cerro Gordo	Clear Lake	176.204	283.573	193	CR B35 (4th Avenue South)	Former Iowa 106
Cerro Gordo	Lake Township	178.210– 179.045	286.801– 288.145	190	I-35 south – Des Moines	Eastern end of I-35 overlap
Cerro Gordo	Lake Township	183.163	294.772	183	Eisenhower Avenue — Airport	
Cerro Gordo	Mason City	186.409	299.996	186	US 65 / US 18 Bus. west – Downtown Mason City, Rockwell	
Cerro Gordo	Portland Township	190.460	306.516	190	CR S56 (California Avenue)	
Cerro Gordo–Floyd county line	Portland–Rock Grove township line	195.596	314.781	195	CR S70 – Nora Springs	
Floyd	Rudd Township	203.141	326.924		CR B30 – Rudd	Former US 18
Floyd	Floyd	210.282	338.416		US 218 north – Floyd, Osage	Northern end of US 218 overlap
Floyd	Floyd Township	212.687	342.287	212	US 218 Bus. / CR B35 – Charles City	
Floyd	Saint Charles Township	214.811	345.705	214	Iowa 14 – Charles City, Greene	
Floyd	Charles City	218.023– 218.464	350.874– 351.584	218	US 218 south / Iowa 27 south – Waterloo US 218 Bus. begins	Eastern end of US 218 and Iowa 27 overlaps; southern end of US 218 Business overlap
Floyd	Charles City	219.311	352.947		Old Highway Road	Former US 218
Floyd	Charles City	220.238	354.439		US 218 Bus. north / Iowa 14 south	Northern end of US 218 Business overlap
Chickasaw	Chickasaw Township	231.617	372.751		CR V14 – Ionia	Former Iowa 393
Chickasaw	New Hampton	237.701– 238.049	382.543– 383.103	204	US 63 north / Iowa 24 east – New Hampton, Lime Springs	Western end of US 63 overlap
Chickasaw	New Hampton Township	240.338	386.787	201	225th Street – New Hampton	
Chickasaw	Dresden Township	244.457– 244.955	393.415– 394.217	196	US 63 south / Iowa 346 west – Nashua, Waterloo	Eastern end of US 63 overlap
Fayette	Bethel Township	258.905	416.667		CR V68 – Waucoma	Former Iowa 193
Fayette	West Union	270.469	435.278		Iowa 150 to Iowa 56 / River Bluffs Scenic Byway – Fayette, Calmar	Western end of River Bluffs Scenic Byway overlap
Fayette	West Union				CR W42 / River Bluffs Scenic Byway	Eastern end of River Bluffs Scenic Byway overlap
Fayette	Clermont				CR B40 / River Bluffs Scenic Byway	Western end of River Bluffs Scenic Byway overlap
Fayette	Clermont				CR B60 / River Bluffs Scenic Byway	Eastern end of River Bluffs Scenic Byway overlap
Clayton	No major junctions					
Allamakee	Post Township	287.042	461.949		US 52 north – Calmar	Western end of US 52 overlap
Allamakee	Postville	288.106	463.662		Iowa 51 north (N. Lawler Street)	
Allamakee	Postville				CR B38 (S. Maple Street) / Driftless Area Scenic Byway	
Clayton	Giard Township	303.396	488.269		US 52 south / River Bluffs Scenic Byway – Guttenberg	Eastern end of US 52 overlap; western end of River Bluffs Scenic Byway overlap
Clayton	Mendon Township	307.864	495.459		Iowa 76 – McGregor	
Clayton	Marquette	311.613	501.493		Iowa 76 / Great River Road / River Bluffs Scenic Byway – Marquette, McGregor	
Mississippi River		311.750	501.713		Marquette–Joliet Bridge; Iowa–Wisconsin state line	
Mississippi River		311.750	501.713		US 18 east / WIS 60 east – Prairie du Chien	Continuation into Wisconsin
1.000 mi = 1.609 km; 1.000 km = 0.621 mi: Concurrency terminus

== See also ==
- Special routes of U.S. Route 18

U.S. Route 18
Previous state: South Dakota	Iowa	Next state: Wisconsin
