= Iowa Highway 4 =

State highway in Iowa, United States

Iowa Highway 4
- Iowa 4 highlighted in red

Route information
- Maintained by Iowa DOT
- Length: 146.343 mi (235.516 km)
- Existed: January 1, 1969–present
- History: 1920–1968: Iowa 17

Major junctions
- South end: Iowa 44 / CR P28 at Panora
- US 30 at Jefferson; US 20 near Rockwell City; Iowa 3 at Pocahontas; US 18 at Emmetsburg; Iowa 9 at Estherville
- North end: MN 4 north of Estherville

Location
- Country: United States
- State: Iowa
- Counties: Guthrie; Greene; Calhoun; Pocahontas; Palo Alto; Emmet

Highway system
- Iowa Primary Highway System; Interstate; US; State; Secondary; Scenic
← Iowa 3	→ No. 4

Iowa Highway 4 (Iowa 4) is a state highway which runs from north to south across the state of Iowa. It is 146 miles (235 km) long, beginning at an intersection with Iowa Highway 44 in Panora and ending at the Minnesota state line north of Estherville. It continues north as Minnesota State Highway 4. The route was created on January 1, 1969, when several route designations were changed to match other states' route numbers. Before 1969, Iowa 4 was known as Iowa 17.

== Route description ==
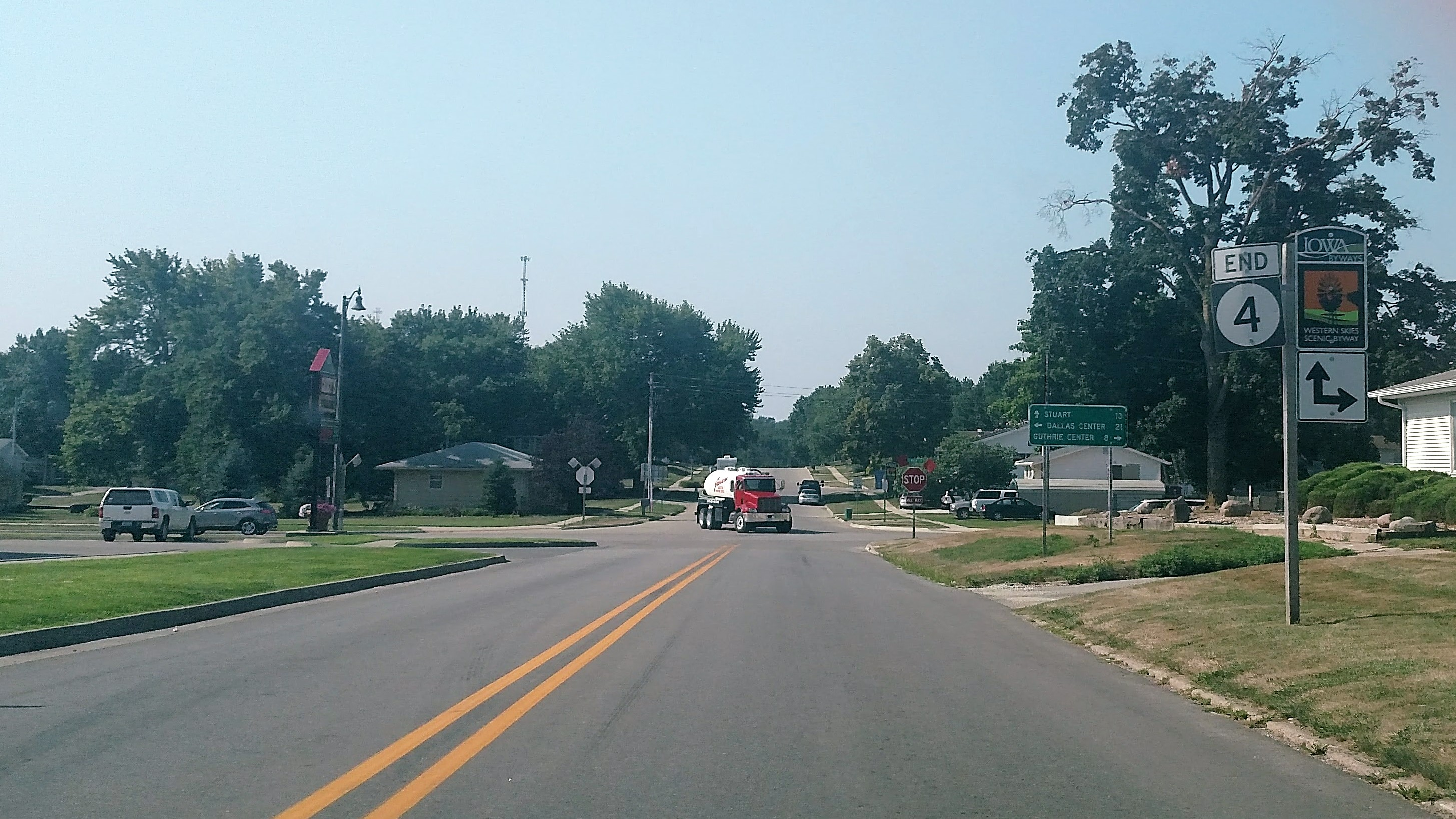
Iowa 4 terminus in Panora

Iowa Highway 4 begins at Panora at Iowa 44. It goes north and is briefly overlapped with Iowa Highway 141 north of Yale. It continues north until Jefferson, where it intersects U.S. Highway 30 (US 30). It goes north, then turns west to enter Churdan, then turns north until meeting Iowa 175. At Iowa 175, the highway turns west, with Iowa 175, passing through Lohrville. It turns north west of Lohrville, and continues north through Rockwell City, where it intersects US 20.

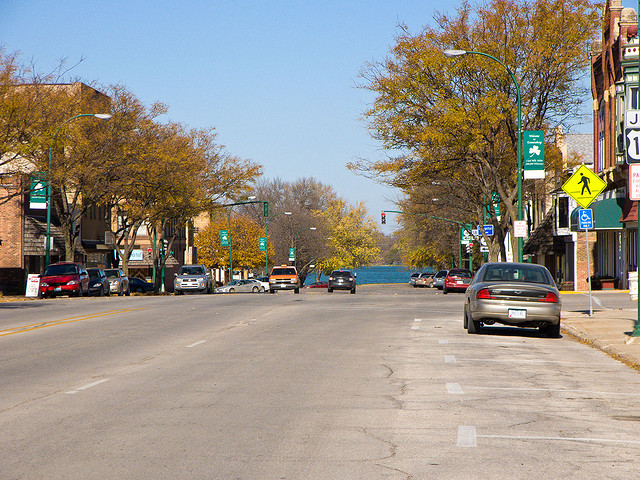
Iowa 4 along Broadway in Emmetsburg

After crossing US 20 at a diamond interchange, Iowa 4 continues north, and intersects Iowa 7. They overlap through Pomeroy, then Iowa 4 goes north through Pocahontas, which is where it intersects Iowa 3. North of Pocahontas, Iowa 4 meets Iowa 10 east of Havelock before passing through Mallard. Iowa 4 then goes north into Emmetsburg, where it meets US 18.

Iowa 4 and US 18 continue west of Emmetsburg together, then Iowa 4 turns north to go through Graettinger. Iowa 4 then turns slightly northwesterly to go through Wallingford, before meeting Iowa 9 in Estherville. Iowa 4 then goes northeasterly out of Estherville before ending at the Minnesota border.

== History ==
Iowa 4 was created on January 1, 1969, during an effort by the Iowa State Highway Commission (IHC) to renumber Iowa's state highways. The goal of the effort was to reduce confusion among drivers crossing into Iowa from other states by aligning Iowa's route numbers with their adjoining routes in other states. However, most of the route on which Iowa 4 is now applied has been in the primary highway system since it was created in 1920.

At its designation, Primary Road No. 17 was a much longer route than Iowa 4 is today. Primary Road No. 17 began in Albia at Primary Road Nos. 8 (now US 34) and 59 (now Iowa 5) and headed northwest through Knoxville and Des Moines. It continued west and north by passing through Adel and Perry before turning more northerly at Jefferson. It entered Rockwell City, Pocahontas, Emmetsburg, and Estherville. It ended at the intersection of Primary Road Nos. 4 (now US 71) and 9 in Spirit Lake.

In 1926, when the U.S. Highway System was introduced, Iowa 17 was shortened on both ends. A service bulletin from the IHC in late 1925 listed Iowa 17 would begin in Jefferson and follow the same route to Estherville. However, maps published the highway commission in 1927 show the route extended south to Adel ending at US 6. By 1931, it had been extended north to the Minnesota state line along what was then Emmet County Road H (CR H).

Ten years later, the southern end of the route shifted west to its current in end Panora, replacing Iowa 150 in its entirety. The sections that were duplicate routes with US 30, US 169, and Iowa 141 were removed, while the standalone section between Grand Junction and Perry became part of Iowa 144. Over the next 28 years, sections of Iowa 17 were straightened and the paving of the route was completed.

As of 2011, construction of a new four-lane expressway for US 20 has caused a portion of that route to be rerouted onto Iowa 4. The expressway begins eastbound at Iowa 4 and extends across the rest of the state to Dubuque.

== Major intersections ==
County	Location	mi	km	Destinations	Notes
Guthrie	Panora	0.000	0.000	Iowa 44 / CR P28 – Guthrie Center, Dallas Center	
Guthrie	Cass–Richland township line	5.981	9.625	CR F25 – Yale	Former Iowa 271
Guthrie	Richland Township	10.249	16.494	Iowa 141 east – Jamaica	Southern end of Iowa 141 overlap
Guthrie	Richland Township	10.696	17.214	Iowa 141 west – Bagley	Northern end of Iowa 141 overlap
Greene	Jefferson	22.680	36.500	Lincoln Highway Heritage Byway (Lincolnway Street)	Former US 30
Greene	Jefferson	24.003	38.629	US 30 – Grand Junction, Scranton	
Calhoun	Reading Township	44.907	72.271	Iowa 175 east / CR P13 north – Farnhamville	Southern end of Iowa 175 overlap
Calhoun	Calhoun Township	53.786	86.560	Iowa 175 west – Lake City	Northern end of Iowa 175 overlap
Calhoun	Rockwell City	62.847	101.142	CR D36 (High Street) – Rockwell City	Former US 20
Calhoun	Twin Lakes Township	63.847	102.752	CR D36 – Sac City	Former US 20
Calhoun	Twin Lakes Township	67.375	108.430	US 20 – Fort Dodge, Sioux City	
Calhoun	Twin Lakes–Sherman township line	69.052	111.128	CR N57 – Twin Lakes State Park	Former Iowa 124
Calhoun	Butler–Sherman township line	72.178	116.159	Iowa 7 east / CR D15 west – Manson	Southern end of Iowa 7 overlap
Pocahontas	Bellville–Colfax township line	77.103	124.085	Iowa 7 west / CR C66 east – Fonda	Northern end of Iowa 7 overlap
Pocahontas	Bellville–Colfax township line	80.096	128.902	CR C56 – Palmer	Former Iowa 315
Pocahontas	Pocahontas	87.076	140.135	Iowa 3 (Elm Street South) – Gilmore City, Cherokee	
Pocahontas	Havelock	93.615	150.659	Iowa 10 west – Laurens	
Pocahontas	Cummins–Powhatan township line	97.124	156.306	CR C15 – Plover	Former Iowa 195
Palo Alto	Emmetsburg	113.258	182.271	US 18 east (Main Street) – Algona	Southern end of US 18 overlap
Palo Alto	Emmetsburg Township	118.027	189.946	US 18 west – Spencer	Northern end of US 18 overlap
Emmet	Estherville	138.133	222.304	Iowa 9 (Central Avenue) – Spirit Lake, Armstrong	
Emmet	Ellsworth Township	146.344	235.518	MN 4 north – Sherburn	Continuation into Minnesota
1.000 mi = 1.609 km; 1.000 km = 0.621 mi: Concurrency terminus
