= Osgood, Iowa =

- Unincorporated community
- Location within Iowa
- Coordinates: 43°11′36″N 94°42′05″W
- Country: United States
- State: Iowa
- County: Palo Alto
- Elevation: 1,227 ft (374 m)
- Time zone: UTC-6 (Central (CST))
  - Summer (DST): UTC-5 (CDT)
- Area code: 712
- GNIS feature ID: 459907

Osgood is an unincorporated community in Walnut Township, Palo Alto County, Iowa, United States. Osgood is located along a Union Pacific Railroad line 5.6 miles (9.0 km) north of Emmetsburg.

== History ==
Founded in the 1800s, Osgood's population was 22 in 1902, and 80 in 1925. The population was 60 in 1940.
