= Alan Gowans (American football) =

American football and basketball coach (1899–1965)

Biographical details
- Born: January 28, 1899; Emmetsburg, Iowa, U.S.
- Died: June 14, 1965 (aged 66); Minneapolis, Minnesota, U.S.

Playing career

Football
- 1920–1921: Cornell (IA)
- Position: Guard

Coaching career (HC unless noted)

Football
- 1922–1924: Emmetsburg HS (IA)
- 1925: Ottawa (assistant)
- 1926–1928: Des Moines
- 1930–1936: Macalester
- 1937–1953: Minneapolis Roosevelt HS (MN)

Basketball
- 1936–1937: Macalester

Head coaching record
- Overall: 24–46–6 (college football)

Alan Oswald Gowans (January 28, 1899 – June 14, 1965) was an American football and basketball coach. He served as the head football coach at Des Moines University in Des Moines, Iowa from 1926 to 1928 and Macalester College in St. Paul, Minnesota from 1930 to 1936. Gowans was also the head basketball coach at Macalester in 1936–37.

Gowans was a native of Emmetsburg, Iowa. He earned a master's degree at the University of Minnesota. After leaving Macalester, Gowans coached football at Roosevelt High School in Minneapolis. He died of cancer on June 14, 1965, in Minneapolis.

== Head coaching record ==
=== College football ===
Year	Team	Overall	Conference	Standing	Bowl/playoffs
Des Moines Tigers (North Central Conference) (1926)
1926	Des Moines	2–7	1–4	7th	
Des Moines Tigers (Independent) (1927–1928)
1927	Des Moines	4–6–1			
1928	Des Moines	4–4–1			
Des Moines:		10–17–2	1–4		
Macalester Scots (Minnesota Intercollegiate Athletic Conference) (1930–1936)
1930	Macalester	5–2	3–2	T–3rd	
1931	Macalester	4–2–1	2–2–1	5th	
1932	Macalester	1–4–1	1–3–1	7th	
1933	Macalester	1–5	1–4	8th	
1934	Macalester	1–5–1	1–3–1	7th	
1935	Macalester	1–5–1	0–3–1	T–6th	
1936	Macalester	1–6	1–4	T–7th	
Macalester:		14–29–4	9–21–4		
Total:		24–46–6			
