= IA4 =

IA4 may refer to:

- Iowa's 4th congressional district
- Iowa Highway 4
- an unofficial backronym for Intel's 4-bit processor architecture
- Ice Age: Continental Drift, also known as Ice Age 4.
