= Rush Lake Township =

Rush Lake Township may refer to:

- Rush Lake Township, Palo Alto County, Iowa
- Rush Lake Township, Otter Tail County, Minnesota
- Rush Lake Township, Pierce County, North Dakota, in Pierce County, North Dakota
