= West Bend–Mallard Community School District =

Public school district in West Bend, Iowa, United States

Coordinates: 42.957761°N 94.451144°W

West Bend-Mallard Community School District

Location
- West Bend, Iowa Palo Alto, Kossuth, Pocahontas and Humboldt counties United States
- Coordinates: 42.957761, -94.451144

District information
- Type: Local school district
- Grades: K-12
- Established: 1995
- Superintendent: Amanda Schmidt
- Schools: 2
- Budget: $5,652,000 (2020-21)
- NCES District ID: 1930720

Students and staff
- Students: 395 (2022-23)
- Teachers: 29.87 FTE
- Staff: 28.78 FTE
- Student–teacher ratio: 13.22
- Athletic conference: Twin Lakes Conference
- District mascot: Wolverines
- Colors: Purple, Gold, and Black

Other information
- Website: www.west-bend.k12.ia.us

West Bend–Mallard Community School District (WBM) is a rural public school district headquartered in a single K-12 (all years) campus in West Bend, Iowa.

The district is mostly in Palo Alto and Kossuth counties, with sections in Pocahontas and Humboldt counties. In addition to West Bend, it serves Mallard and Rodman.

== History ==
In the mid-1980s, the West Bend and Mallard school districts began sharing some classes with each other, including geography, advanced math, Spanish, and economics. In 1990, an agreement was reached between the two districts to move toward consolidation on a two-year time scale. Starting with the 1991–1992 academic year, the West Bend-Mallard school district was established under the combined name. The school mascots had previously been the West Bend Bulldogs and the Mallard Ducks. Despite the Des Moines Register's suggestion that the new mascot be the "Grotto Ducks" (given the well-known presence of ducks at West Bend's Grotto of the Redemption), the students of the newly combined school district elected to call themselves the West Bend-Mallard Wolverines. The merger also combined one color from each of the schools' previous school colors to produce the new school colors: purple (from West Bend's previous purple and white) and gold (from Mallard's previous black and gold). The consolidation process was fully finished and finalized as of July 1, 1995.

For the first decade of the West Bend-Mallard school district's existence, each town maintained its own elementary school and middle school buildings, while Mallard students commuted to the West Bend building for high school. In the late 1990s and early 2000s, West Bend middle schoolers would attend classes during the first half of the day at the West Bend building and would then be bused to the Mallard building to attend classes during the latter half of the day. In the mid-2000s, all middle school operations were moved to the West Bend building, so that Mallard middle school students now also began commuting to the West Bend building. This left, in the Mallard school building, only the elementary classes for Mallard resident students. In 2019, the declining population and enrollment in the town of Mallard caused the district to decide to move all Mallard students and teachers, for all grades, completely to the West Bend building. After some community debate, it was decided that the now-empty Mallard school building should be demolished, to prevent it from dilapidating and becoming an eyesore or a safety hazard. The demolition of the 103-year-old Mallard school building occurred in March 2020.

By 2011, the West Bend-Mallard school district began a grade-sharing agreement with the Gilmore City–Bradgate Community School District in which GC-B sent its high school students to WB-M. By 2012 the two districts were in talks to also have GC-B send middle school grades 7–8 to WB-M, as GC-B only had 11 students in those grades. the school is ranked the 2nd poorest in the state due to low enrollment and no sponsors.

== Schools ==
The district operates three schools, all in West Bend:

- West Bend-Mallard High School.
- West Bend-Mallard Middle School.
- West Bend-Mallard Elementary.

=== West Bend-Mallard High School ===
==== Athletics ====
The Wolverines compete in the Twin Lakes Conference in the following sports:

- Cross country
- Volleyball
- Football
  - 4-time Class A State Champions (1994, 1998, 1999, 2004)
- Basketball
- Wrestling
- Track and field
  - Boys' 2-time Class 1A State Champions (1993, 1994).
- Golf
- Baseball
- Softball
- Archery

== See also ==
- List of school districts in Iowa
- List of high schools in Iowa
