= Ellington Township =

Ellington Township may refer to the following places in the United States:

- Ellington Township, Adams County, Illinois
- Ellington Township, Palo Alto County, Iowa
- Ellington Township, Michigan
- Ellington Township, Minnesota
