= Ayrshire, Iowa =

- City
- Location of Ayrshire, Iowa
- Coordinates: 43°02′23″N 94°50′02″W
- Country: USA
- State: Iowa
- County: Palo Alto

Area
  - Total: 0.22 sq mi (0.56 km^{2})
  - Land: 0.22 sq mi (0.56 km^{2})
  - Water: 0 sq mi (0.00 km^{2})
- Elevation: 1,329 ft (405 m)

Population (2020)
  - Total: 133
  - Density: 615.9/sq mi (237.81/km^{2})
- Time zone: UTC-6 (Central (CST))
  - Summer (DST): UTC-5 (CDT)
- ZIP code: 50515
- Area code: 712
- FIPS code: 19-04105
- GNIS feature ID: 2394046

Ayrshire is a city in Palo Alto County, Iowa, United States. The population was 133 at the 2020 census.

== History ==
In the 1880s the Des Moines and Fort Dodge Railroad (later part of Minneapolis and St. Louis Railway), having reached Fort Dodge, began building to the northwest. In October 1882 the rails reached the location of Ayrshire, and a depot was built the following month. The railroad had acquired 80 acres for a townsite, and by 1883 several businesses had been established.

Ayrshire was incorporated on September 20, 1895.

At one time it had two banks, two grocery stores, blacksmith shop, livery stable, creamery, hotel, at least two barber shops; Lutheran, Catholic, Methodist and Baptist churches; five gas stations, grain elevator, two cafes, a locker plant, a pharmacy, a lumber yard, two beer halls and several other businesses. It had both a Catholic and a public high school. The Catholic high school closed in 1947. The lower grades closed in 1968. The public school closed in the spring of 1982. The public school mascot was the Ayrshire Beavers.

In 1972, the town drew national attention for having the youngest mayor in America. Jody Smith was nineteen when he was elected mayor.

The rail line, by then part of the Chicago and North Western Railway, was abandoned in the 1980s, and torn up.

The town celebrated its Quasquicentennial in 2007.

== Geography ==
According to the United States Census Bureau, the city has a total area of 0.21 square miles (0.54 km^{2}), all land.

== Demographics ==
Historical populations
Year	Pop.	±%
1900	329	—
1910	337	+2.4%
1920	361	+7.1%
1930	343	−5.0%
1940	391	+14.0%
1950	334	−14.6%
1960	298	−10.8%
1970	243	−18.5%
1980	243	+0.0%
1990	195	−19.8%
2000	202	+3.6%
2010	143	−29.2%
2020	133	−7.0%
Source:"U.S. Census website". United States Census Bureau. and Iowa Data Center; Source: U.S. Decennial Census

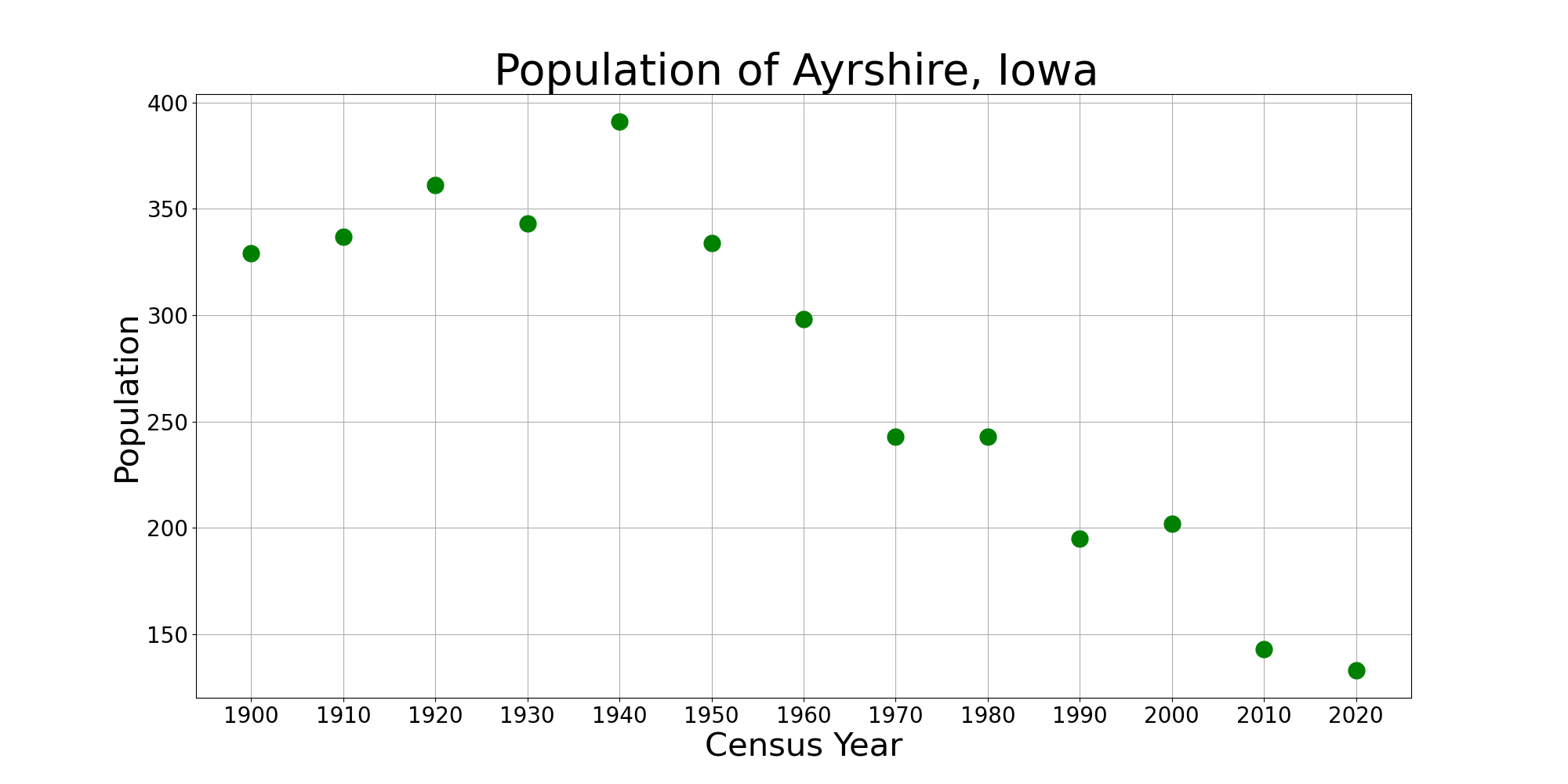
The population of Ayrshire, Iowa from US census data

=== 2020 census ===
As of the census of 2020, there were 133 people, 70 households, and 32 families residing in the city. The population density was 615.9 inhabitants per square mile (237.8/km^{2}). There were 80 housing units at an average density of 370.5 per square mile (143.0/km^{2}). The racial makeup of the city was 97.7% White, 0.0% Black or African American, 0.0% Native American, 0.0% Asian, 0.0% Pacific Islander, 0.0% from other races and 2.3% from two or more races. Hispanic or Latino persons of any race comprised 4.5% of the population.

Of the 70 households, 25.7% of which had children under the age of 18 living with them, 22.9% were married couples living together, 14.3% were cohabitating couples, 32.9% had a female householder with no spouse or partner present and 30.0% had a male householder with no spouse or partner present. 54.3% of all households were non-families. 41.4% of all households were made up of individuals, 20.0% had someone living alone who was 65 years old or older.

The median age in the city was 44.8 years. 25.6% of the residents were under the age of 20; 6.0% were between the ages of 20 and 24; 18.8% were from 25 and 44; 29.3% were from 45 and 64; and 20.3% were 65 years of age or older. The gender makeup of the city was 50.4% male and 49.6% female.

=== 2010 census ===
As of the census of 2010, there were 143 people, 75 households, and 34 families residing in the city. The population density was 681.0 inhabitants per square mile (262.9/km^{2}). There were 95 housing units at an average density of 452.4 per square mile (174.7/km^{2}). The racial makeup of the city was 100.0% White.

There were 75 households, of which 20.0% had children under the age of 18 living with them, 30.7% were married couples living together, 12.0% had a female householder with no husband present, 2.7% had a male householder with no wife present, and 54.7% were non-families. 52.0% of all households were made up of individuals, and 24% had someone living alone who was 65 years of age or older. The average household size was 1.91 and the average family size was 2.88.

The median age in the city was 48.8 years. 21.7% of residents were under the age of 18; 4.9% were between the ages of 18 and 24; 18.2% were from 25 to 44; 30.1% were from 45 to 64; and 25.2% were 65 years of age or older. The gender makeup of the city was 52.4% male and 47.6% female.

=== 2000 census ===
As of the census of 2000, there were 202 people, 89 households, and 55 families residing in the city. The population density was 970.6 inhabitants per square mile (374.8/km^{2}). There were 98 housing units at an average density of 470.9 per square mile (181.8/km^{2}). The racial makeup of the city was 100.00% White.

There were 89 households, out of which 25.8% had children under the age of 18 living with them, 53.9% were married couples living together, 7.9% had a female householder with no husband present, and 38.2% were non-families. 34.8% of all households were made up of individuals, and 18.0% had someone living alone who was 65 years of age or older. The average household size was 2.27 and the average family size was 2.96.

In the city, the population was spread out, with 26.2% under the age of 18, 5.0% from 18 to 24, 21.8% from 25 to 44, 26.2% from 45 to 64, and 20.8% who were 65 years of age or older. The median age was 43 years. For every 100 females, there were 87.0 males. For every 100 females age 18 and over, there were 91.0 males.

The median income for a household in the city was $27,500, and the median income for a family was $30,893. Males had a median income of $26,750 versus $15,000 for females. The per capita income for the city was $13,371. None of the families and 4.8% of the population were living below the poverty line, including no under eighteens and 7.1% of those over 64.

=== Population trends ===
The number of residents decreased from 202 in 2000 to 143 in the 2010 census, less than half the population a century earlier, 329 in 1900 and 337 in 1910.

== Education ==
Ruthven-Ayrshire Community School District serves the community. It was a part of the Ayrshire Community School District until July 1, 1983, when it merged into Ruthven-Ayrshire.
