= Curlew, Iowa =

- City
- Location of Curlew, Iowa
- Coordinates: 42°58′47″N 94°44′16″W
- Country: USA
- State: Iowa
- County: Palo Alto

Area
  - Total: 0.75 sq mi (1.94 km^{2})
  - Land: 0.75 sq mi (1.94 km^{2})
  - Water: 0 sq mi (0.00 km^{2})
- Elevation: 1,243 ft (379 m)

Population (2020)
  - Total: 37
  - Density: 49.3/sq mi (19.05/km^{2})
- Time zone: UTC-6 (Central (CST))
  - Summer (DST): UTC-5 (CDT)
- ZIP code: 50527
- Area code: 712
- FIPS code: 19-17895
- GNIS feature ID: 2393697

Curlew is a city in Palo Alto County, Iowa, United States. The population was 37 at the time of the 2020 census.

Curlew originated in 1882 with the construction of the Des Moines and Fort Dodge Railroad in the area.

== History ==
Curlew got its start in the year 1882, following construction of the Des Moines and Fort Dodge Railroad through that territory. It was named by the railroad president, an avid hunter, from the curlew birds found in the area.

== Geography ==
According to the United States Census Bureau, the city has a total area of 0.76 square miles (1.97 km^{2}), all land.

== Demographics ==
Historical populations
Year	Pop.	±%
1910	161	—
1920	204	+26.7%
1930	178	−12.7%
1940	183	+2.8%
1950	151	−17.5%
1960	134	−11.3%
1970	95	−29.1%
1980	85	−10.5%
1990	56	−34.1%
2000	62	+10.7%
2010	58	−6.5%
2020	37	−36.2%
Source:"U.S. Census website". United States Census Bureau. and Iowa Data Center; Source: U.S. Decennial Census

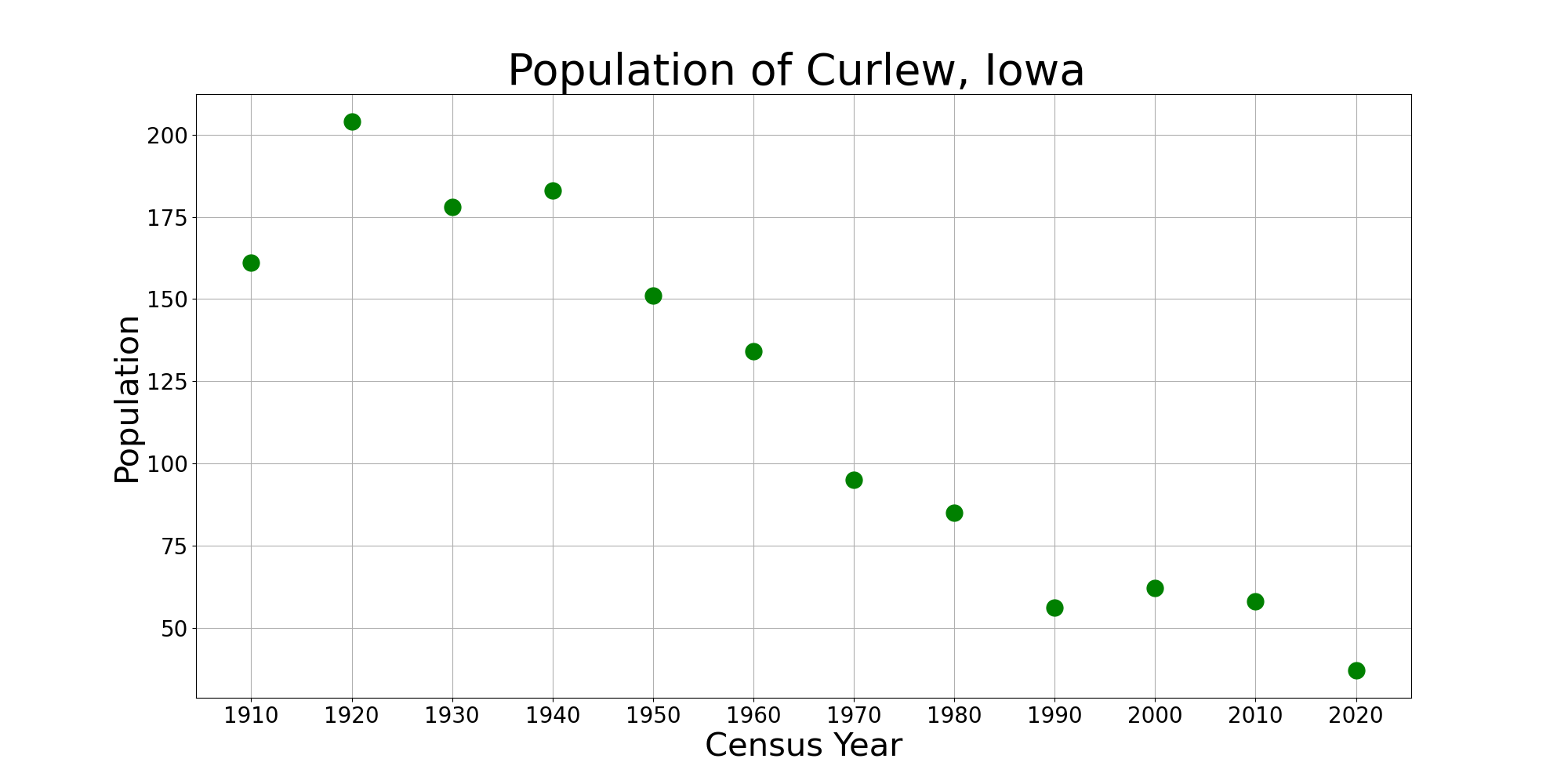
The population of Curlew, Iowa from US census data

=== 2020 census ===
As of the census of 2020, there were 37 people, 13 households, and 12 families residing in the city. The population density was 49.3 inhabitants per square mile (19.0/km^{2}). There were 26 housing units at an average density of 34.7 per square mile (13.4/km^{2}). The racial makeup of the city was 100.0% White, 0.0% Black or African American, 0.0% Native American, 0.0% Asian, 0.0% Pacific Islander, 0.0% from other races and 0.0% from two or more races. Hispanic or Latino persons of any race comprised 0.0% of the population.

Of the 13 households, 46.2% of which had children under the age of 18 living with them, 76.9% were married couples living together, 0.0% were cohabitating couples, 23.1% had a female householder with no spouse or partner present and 0.0% had a male householder with no spouse or partner present. 7.7% of all households were non-families. 7.7% of all households were made up of individuals, 7.7% had someone living alone who was 65 years old or older.

The median age in the city was 41.5 years. 35.1% of the residents were under the age of 20; 0.0% were between the ages of 20 and 24; 21.6% were from 25 and 44; 24.3% were from 45 and 64; and 18.9% were 65 years of age or older. The gender makeup of the city was 45.9% male and 54.1% female.

=== 2010 census ===
At the 2010 census there were 58 people in 24 households, including 17 families, in the city. The population density was 76.3 inhabitants per square mile (29.5/km^{2}). There were 31 housing units at an average density of 40.8 per square mile (15.8/km^{2}). The racial makup of the city was 98.3% White and 1.7% African American. Of the 24 households 25.0% had children under the age of 18 living with them, 50.0% were married couples living together, 12.5% had a female householder with no husband present, 8.3% had a male householder with no wife present, and 29.2% were non-families. 16.7% of households were one person and 12.5% were one person aged 65 or older. The average household size was 2.42 and the average family size was 2.59.

The median age was 44.3 years. 19% of residents were under the age of 18; 10.3% were between the ages of 18 and 24; 24.1% were from 25 to 44; 27.6% were from 45 to 64; and 19% were 65 or older. The gender makeup of the city was 50.0% male and 50.0% female.

=== 2000 census ===
At the 2000 census there were 62 people in 30 households, including 17 families, in the city. The population density was 81.8 inhabitants per square mile (31.6/km^{2}). There were 36 housing units at an average density of 47.5 per square mile (18.3/km^{2}). The racial makup of the city was 100.00% White. Of the 30 households 20.0% had children under the age of 18 living with them, 56.7% were married couples living together, and 43.3% were non-families. 43.3% of households were one person and 23.3% were one person aged 65 or older. The average household size was 2.07 and the average family size was 2.88.

The age distribution was 22.6% under the age of 18, 32.3% from 25 to 44, 17.7% from 45 to 64, and 27.4% 65 or older. The median age was 42 years. For every 100 females, there were 72.2 males. For every 100 females age 18 and over, there were 84.6 males.

The median household income was $20,250 and the median family income was $20,417. Males had a median income of $11,250 versus $6,250 for females. The per capita income for the city was $23,788. There were 30.8% of families and 28.1% of the population living below the poverty line, including 72.7% of under eighteens and none of those over 64.

== Education ==
Emmetsburg Community School District operates public schools.

== Notable people ==
- Paul Brechler, basketball player and University of Iowa athletic director 1947–1960
- Nancy Cox, virologist, and she served as the Director of the Influenza Division at the CDC.
