= Emmetsburg Community School District =

Public school district in Emmetsburg, Iowa, United States

Coordinates: 43.117161°N 94.692981°W

Location
- Emmetsburg, Iowa Palo Alto County United States
- Coordinates: 43.117161, -94.692981

District information
- Type: Local school district
- Grades: K-12
- Superintendent: Corey Jenness
- Schools: 3
- Budget: $12,799,000 (2020-21)
- NCES District ID: 1910950

Students and staff
- Students: 790 (2022-23)
- Teachers: 53.84 FTE
- Staff: 74.04 FTE
- Student–teacher ratio: 14.68
- Athletic conference: Twin Lakes
- District mascot: E-Hawks
- Colors: Black, Gold and White

Other information
- Website: www.e-hawks.org

Emmetsburg Community School District (ECSD) is a rural public school district headquartered in Emmetsburg, Iowa.

Entirely in Palo Alto County, it serves Emmetsburg, Curlew, and Cylinder.

== History ==
It has a partial day sharing agreement with the Ruthven-Ayrshire Community School District. Between 1930 and 1970 the district operated Emmetsburg Junior College, which is now a branch campus of Iowa Lakes Community College.

== Schools ==
- Emmetsburg High School
  - In 2017, the district had 229 high school students. That year, Dan Voigt of the Emmetsburg News stated that the enrollment size "puts them in the upper echelon of the Twin Lakes schools" athletic division.
- Emmetsburg Middle School
- West Elementary School

=== Emmetsburg High School ===
==== Athletics ====
The E-Hawks compete in the Twin Lakes Conference in the following sports:

- Cross Country
- Volleyball
- Football
  - 9-time State Champions (1977, 1979, 1989, 1990, 1997, 2000, 2002, 2003, 2008)
- Basketball
  - Girls 1991 6v6 State Champions
- Wrestling
  - 12-time State Champions (1976, 1977, 1978, 1982, 1985, 2000, 2001, 2002, 2003, 2005, 2006)
  - 2-time Class 2A State Duals Champions (2000, 2003)
- Track and Field
- Golf
  - Boys' 2006 Class 2A State Champions
- Baseball
  - 2001 Class 2A State Champions
- Softball

== See also ==
- List of school districts in Iowa
- List of high schools in Iowa
