= Iowa Primary Road No. 4 =

Primary Road No. 4

Route information
- Maintained by Iowa State Highway Commission

Location
- Country: United States
- State: Iowa

Highway system
- Iowa Primary Highway System; Interstate; US; State; Secondary; Scenic
← Iowa 4	→ Iowa 5

Primary Road No. 4 was a state highway in western Iowa. It is related to the current highways:

- U.S. Highway 275 between the Missouri state line and Hillsdale
- U.S. Highway 34 between Hillsdale and Hastings
- U.S. Highway 59 between Hastings and Denison
- Iowa Highway 39 between Dension and Odebolt
- Iowa Highway 175 between Odebolt and near Wall Lake
- Iowa Highway 471 between near Wall Lake to Early
- U.S. Highway 71 between Early and the Minnesota state line
