= Nancy Cox (virologist) =

American virologist (1949–2026)

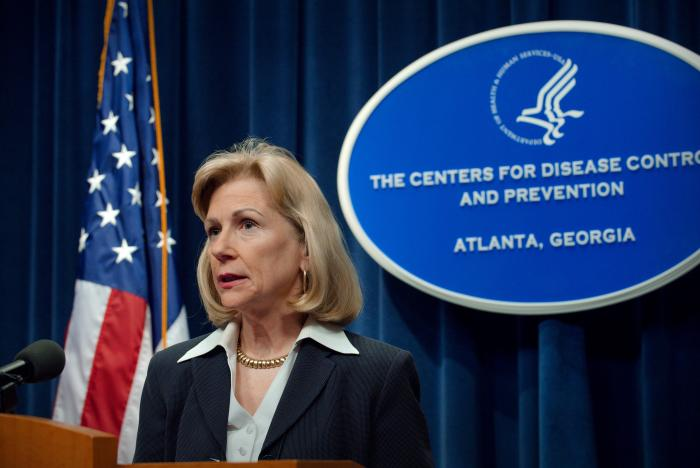
Chief of the Influenza Branch for the National Center for Infectious Diseases, Nancy Cox, Ph.D., at the podium during a Centers for Disease Control (CDC) press briefing.

Nancy Jane Cox (July 21, 1948 – April 23, 2026) was an American virologist who served as the director of the influenza division at the Centers for Disease Control and Prevention (CDC) from 2006 to 2014 and as director of the CDC's World Health Organization (WHO) Collaborating Center for Surveillance, Epidemiology and Control of Influenza from 1992 to 2014. Cox served as the Chair and Co-Chair of the Scientific Advisory Council of GISAID, between the years 2008 and 2017 and was frequently recognized for having played an instrumental role in the success of GISAID.

== Life and career ==
Nancy J. Cox was born on July 21, 1948, in Emmetsburg, Iowa, and grew up in Curlew, Iowa. She was educated at Iowa State University, graduating in 1970 with a degree in bacteriology. Cox was awarded a Marshall Scholarship to study in England at Darwin College, University of Cambridge, where in 1975 she earned a doctoral degree in virology.

Cox started working on influenza at the CDC in 1976. She retired in December 2014, after 37 years and 278 publications. Over the course of her career, Cox helped transform the surveillance and science of influenza viruses and vaccines worldwide. At the CDC, she set the standards for measuring immune response in infected and vaccinated people, and also led the agency to be the global reference center for antiviral resistance and for measuring transmission of influenza viruses in animal models. As director of the World Health Organization (WHO) Collaborating Center for the Surveillance, Epidemiology and Control of Influenza at the CDC, Cox worked closely with public health officials from Russia, Vietnam and China, helping to transform their capabilities in influenza virology and surveillance. Her work with WHO also led to significant changes in the methods, reporting, interpretation, and policy development for selecting vaccine viruses for use in annual influenza vaccine production.

She was the recipient of ten CDC recognition awards, seven Nakano Awards, seven Charles C. Shepard Science Awards, The Lancet's "Paper of the Year", Time Magazine's "The Time 100: People Who Shape Our World", the Service to America Award, CDC's Lifetime Achievement Award and the US Government Federal Employee of the Year award.

Cox died in Atlanta, Georgia, from glioblastoma in April 23, 2026, at the age of 77.

Government offices
Preceded by	Director of the Influenza Division at the Centers for Disease Control and Prevention; 2006–2014	Succeeded by Daniel B. Jernigan
Non-profit organization positions
Preceded by	Director of the WHO Collaborating Center for Surveillance, Epidemiology and Control of Influenza, Atlanta; 1992–2014	Succeeded by Jacqueline M. Katz
Educational offices
New title	Co-Chair of GISAID Scientific Advisory Council; 2008–2017	Succeeded by Jacqueline M. Katz
