= Paul Brechler =

American athletic director and conference commissioner

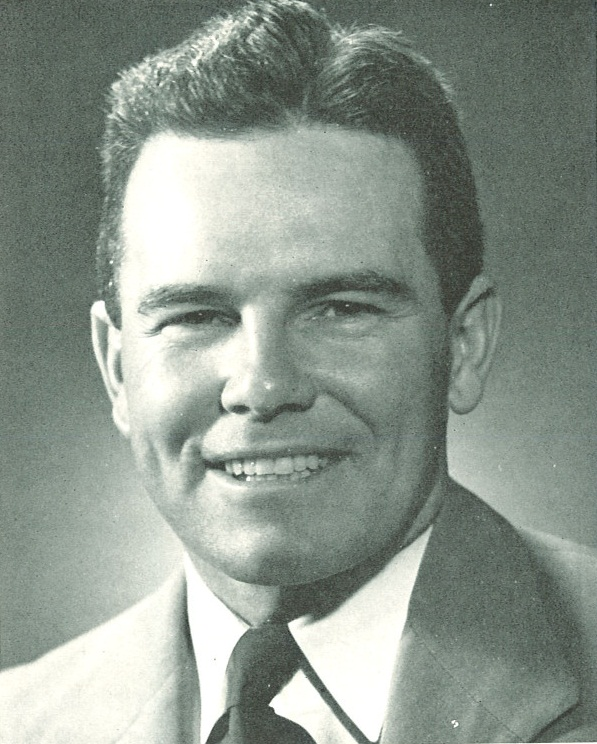
- Brechler from 1960 Hawkeye

Biographical details
- Born: July 17, 1911; Curlew, Iowa, U.S.
- Died: September 13, 1997 (aged 86); Denver, Colorado, U.S.
- Education: Drake University (BA); University of Iowa (MA, PhD)

Playing career

Football
- c. 1931–1933: Drake

Basketball
- c. 1931–1934: Drake
- Positions: Guard, end (football)

Coaching career (HC unless noted)

Basketball
- c. 1945: Iowa (assistant)

Administrative career (AD unless noted)
- 1947–1960: Iowa
- 1960–1962: Skyline Conference (commissioner)
- 1962–1968: WAC (commissioner)
- 1968–1971: California
- 1976–1990: Rocky Mountain Athletic Conference (commissioner)

Paul Walter Brechler (July 17, 1911 – September 13, 1997) was an athletic director for the University of Iowa for 13 years and the first commissioner of the Western Athletic Conference.

== Playing career ==
Brechler graduated from Emmetsburg High School before attending Drake University in Des Moines, Iowa. He played football and basketball at Drake. Brechler was a guard and end for the Bulldog football team and was the captain of Drake's 1933 team. He was also a two-time all-conference football selection. Brechler graduated from Drake with a Bachelor of Arts degree in social studies in 1934.

He then became a high school coach at Harlan High School and at a high school in Iowa City. Brechler earned his master's degree in Physical education in 1941 and his doctorate degree in Education administration from in 1943 both from the University of Iowa. After two years of naval service, Brechler took the position of business manager at the University of Iowa in 1946. One year later, E. G. Schroeder resigned as Iowa's athletic director, and Paul Brechler succeeded him on July 1, 1947. At the time, he was the youngest athletic director in the history of the Big Ten Conference.

== Athletic director at Iowa ==
During his tenure at Iowa, Brechler hired several successful head coaches. He hired Forest Evashevski in football, who won two Rose Bowls and three Big Ten championships. He hired Bucky O'Connor in basketball, who won two Big Ten championships and led Iowa to two Final Fours. Brechler also hired Francis Cretzmeyer in track and cross country, who led Iowa to multiple Big Ten titles. He hired Dave McCuskey in wrestling, who led Iowa to its first conference championship in the sport, and Don Klotz in tennis, who coached Iowa to its only conference title in the sport in 1958.

Brechler was also responsible for the expansion of Iowa's athletics facilities. He directed construction of the Athletics Office Building next to the Fieldhouse and Finkbine Golf Course. Brechler also expanded seating capacity at Iowa Stadium and constructed a new press box at the facility.

Near the end of his tenure as Iowa athletic director, Paul Brechler had a bitter public feud with head football coach Forest Evashevski. In 1959, Evy called working conditions at the university “intolerable”. As a result, some of Evy's supporters demanded Brechler's resignation.

== First WAC commissioner and administrative career ==
In 1960, Brechler left Iowa to become commissioner of the Skyline Conference. When that league folded two years later, he was named the first commissioner of the Western Athletic Conference in 1962. Brechler served as WAC commissioner for six years before taking the job as athletic director at the University of California in 1968. He later became the commissioner of the Rocky Mountain Athletic Conference, serving from 1976 to 1990.

== Honors ==
Brechler was named to the Iowa Sports Hall of Fame in 1989. He was also selected to the University of Iowa Athletics Hall of Fame in 1990. When the University of Iowa renovated Kinnick Stadium in 2006, they named the press box in Paul Brechler's honor. In 2002, Brechler was inducted into the Rocky Mountain Athletic Conference Hall of Fame.

== Personal life and death ==
Brechler married to Wanda Krabbenhoft in 1957 until his death in 1997.

Brechler also served in the United States Navy as a lieutenant during World War II and in the military reserve force from 1960-1971 where he then attained up to the rank of colonel.
