= Ruthven-Ayrshire Community School District =

Public school district in Ruthven, Iowa, United States

Coordinates: 43.131666°N 94.901881°W

Graettinger-Terril/Ruthven-Ayrshire Community School Districts

Address
- Ruthven, Iowa Palo Alto and Clay counties United States
- Coordinates: 43.131666, -94.901881

District information
- Type: Local school district
- Grades: K-12
- Established: 1983 (42 years ago)
- Superintendent: Marshall Lewis
- Schools: 3
- Budget: $4,151,000 (2020-21)
- NCES District ID: 1925050

Students and staff
- Students: 164 (2022-23)
- Teachers: 18.30 FTE
- Staff: 22.65 FTE
- Student–teacher ratio: 8.96
- Athletic conference: Twin Lakes
- District mascot: Titans
- Colors: Purple, silver, black

Other information
- Website: ruthven.k12.ia.us

Graettinger-Terril/Ruthven-Ayrshire is a rural public school district headquartered in Ruthven, Iowa. Also serving Ayrshire, the district is located in Palo Alto and Clay counties.

== History ==
The district was formed on July 1, 1983, by the merger of the Ayrshire School District and the Ruthven School District. On July 1, 2010, the South Clay Community School District was dissolved, and portions went to Ruthven-Ayrshire.

In 2011, the district and the Graettinger–Terril Community School District agreed to do athletic team sharing. In 2013, the district and Graettinger–Terril agreed to a partial-day sharing arrangement in that high school students may spend portions of their school days at each campus for certain courses. They began discussing the idea in October 2012. They had discussed the possibility of whole grade-sharing, but Ruthven-Ayrshire canceled those talks in January 2013, stating that it wanted to have its own students in its own high school. Ruthven-Ayrshire has a partial day sharing agreement with the Graettinger-Terril School District.

== Schools ==
The district operates two schools, both in Ruthven:

- Ruthven-Ayrshire Elementary School
- Ruthven-Ayrshire High School

=== Ruthven-Ayrshire High School ===
The Titans compete in the Twin Lakes Conference in the following sports as G-T/R-A:

- Cross country
- Volleyball
- Football
- Basketball
- Wrestling
- Track and field
- Golf
- Baseball
- Softball

== See also ==
- List of school districts in Iowa
- List of high schools in Iowa
