= Frank Mulroney =

American baseball player (1903–1985)

- Pitcher
- Born: April 8, 1903; Mallard, Iowa, U.S.
- Died: November 11, 1985 (aged 82); Aberdeen, Washington, U.S.
- Batted: Right Threw: Right

MLB debut
- April 15, 1930, for the Boston Red Sox

Last MLB appearance
- June 24, 1930, for the Boston Red Sox

MLB statistics
- Win–loss record: 0–1
- Earned run average: 3.00
- Strikeouts: 2
- Stats at Baseball Reference

Teams
- Boston Red Sox (1930)

Francis Joseph Mulroney (April 8, 1903 – November 11, 1985) was an American relief pitcher in Major League Baseball who played briefly for the Boston Red Sox during the 1930 season. Listed at 6 ft 0 in (1.83 m), 170 lb., Mulroney batted and threw right-handed. A native of Mallard, Iowa, he attended University of Iowa.

Mulroney posted a 0–1 record with a 3.00 ERA and two strikeouts in two relief appearances, allowing one run and three hits in 3.0 innings of work without saves.

Mulroney died at the age of 82 in Aberdeen, Washington.

== See also ==
- 1930 Boston Red Sox season
