= Freedom Township, Palo Alto County, Iowa =

Township in Palo Alto County, Iowa, U.S.

Coordinates: 43°08′N 94°37′W

Freedom Township is a township in Palo Alto County, Iowa, United States.
