= Palo Alto County Courthouse =

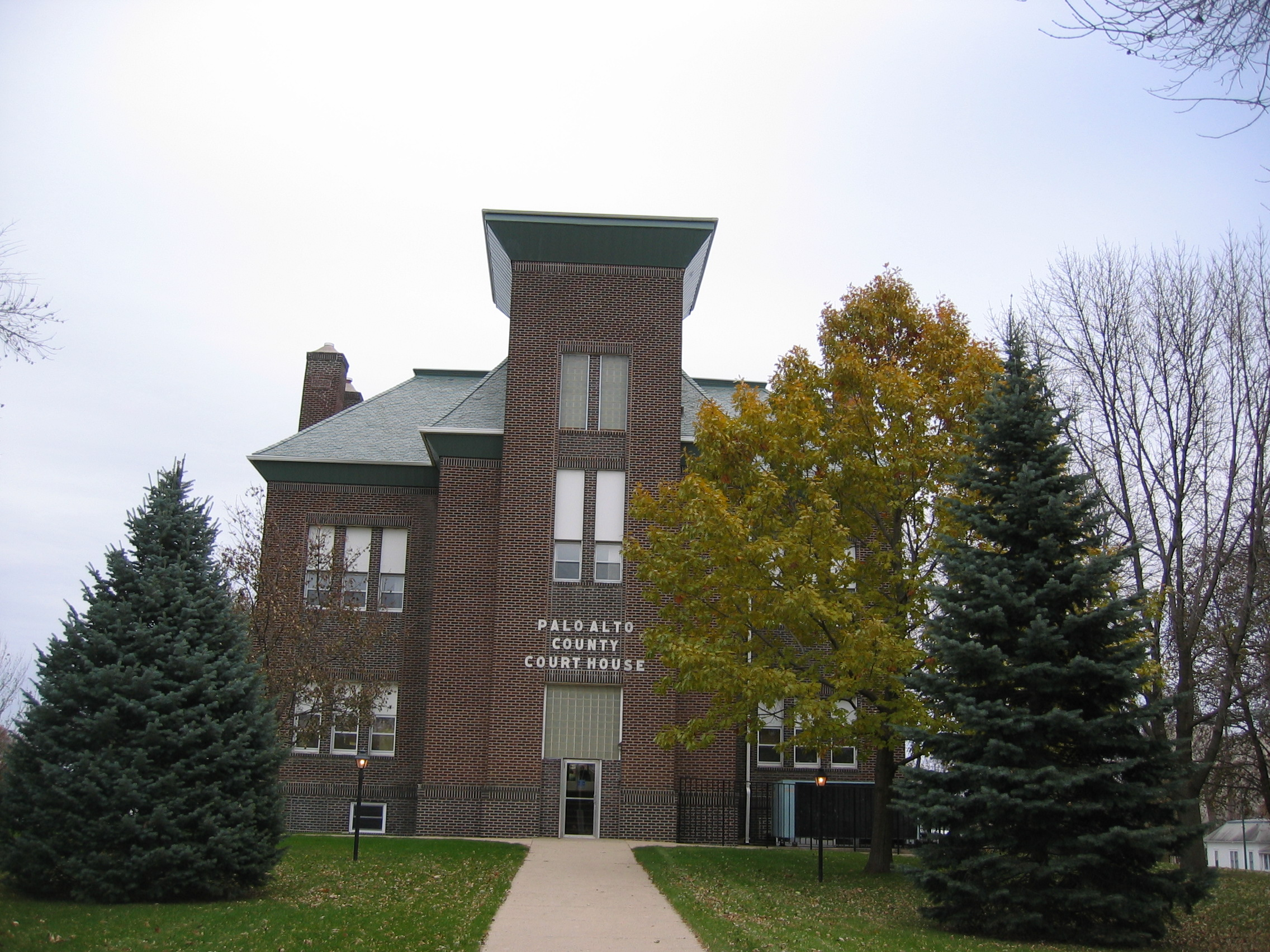
- Palo Alto County Courthouse
- Interactive map of the Palo Alto County Courthouse area

General information
- Type: Courthouse
- Architectural style: Victorian
- Location: 1010 Broadway, Emmetsburg, Iowa, United States
- Coordinates: 43.110619°N 94.677525°W
- Completed: 1880

Technical details
- Floor count: Two

Design and construction
- Architect: B.J. Bartlett
- Main contractor: D.E. Burdick

The Palo Alto County Courthouse is located in Emmetsburg, Iowa, United States. It is the second building the county has used for court functions and county administration.

== History ==
The first county seat was Paoli. The county judge contracted to have a courthouse and schoolhouse built there in 1859. Construction began, but by 1865 neither building had been completed. The county won a judgment against the contractor and the courthouse was completed in 1866 for $1,060. Emmetsburg became the county seat in 1875. The present courthouse was built there in 1880. It was designed by B.J. Bartlet and built by D.E. Burdick. At the time it was built it featured Victorian characteristics. The building was extensively remodeled from 1960 to 1961 and the cupola and arches over the windows were removed, and the main entrance was changed. A brick veneer was also placed over the exterior. The building is capped with a hipped roof.
