= West Bend Township, Palo Alto County, Iowa =

Township in Iowa, USA

Coordinates: 42°57′N 94°30′W

West Bend Township is a township in Palo Alto County, Iowa, USA.
