= Booth Township, Palo Alto County, Iowa =

Township in Palo Alto County, Iowa, U.S.

Coordinates: 42.9543°N 94.8510°W

Booth Township is a township in Palo Alto County, Iowa, United States.
