= Marquette–Joliet Bridge =

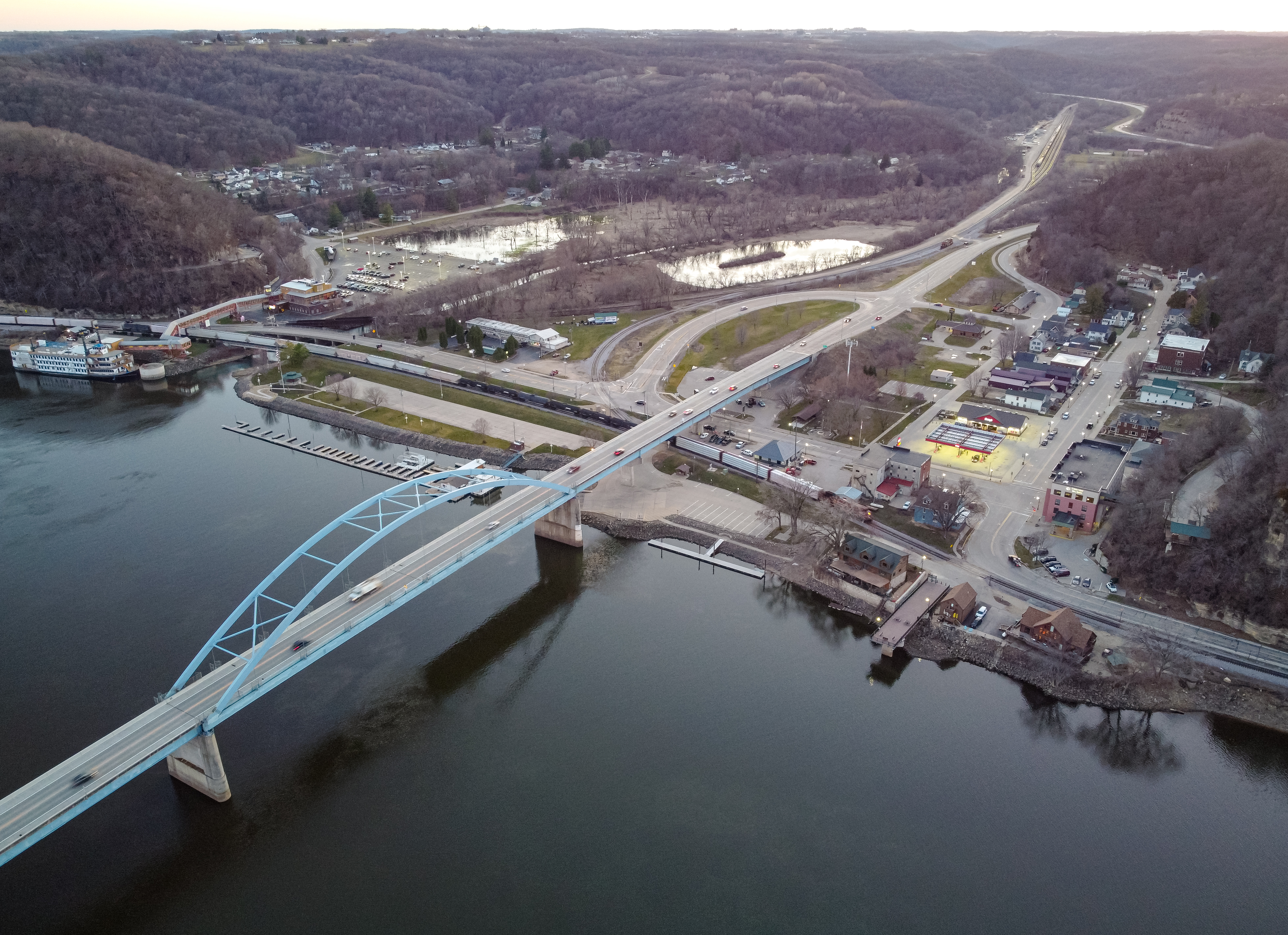
- US-18 is carried by Marquette–Joliet Bridge into Marquette, Iowa
- Coordinates: 43°02′38″N 91°10′33″W
- Carries: 2 lanes of US 18 / WIS 60
- Crosses: Mississippi River
- Locale: Marquette, Iowa and Prairie du Chien, Wisconsin
- Other name(s): Marquette Bridge, Prairie Bridge
- Maintained by: Wisconsin Department of Transportation
- ID number: 000000000020515

Characteristics
- Design: Tied arch bridge
- Total length: 780.8 meters (2,561.7 ft)
- Width: 12.2 meters (40.0 ft)
- Longest span: 462 feet (141 m)
- Clearance above: 8.71 meters (28.58 ft)
- Clearance below: 18.3 meters (60.0 ft)

History
- Opened: June 1975

The Marquette–Joliet Bridge is a bridge crossing the Mississippi River, connecting Marquette, Iowa and Prairie du Chien, Wisconsin. Local residents refer to the bridge as the Prairie Bridge or the Marquette Bridge; both terms are used equally.

The structure is an automobile bridge about three lanes wide, and is designed to accept Jersey barriers for deck service. It is located between the Black Hawk Bridge, about 40 miles (64 km) to the north upstream, and the Dubuque-Wisconsin Bridge some 60 miles (97 km) south. The bridge carries U.S. Route 18 from Iowa to Wisconsin.

The design of the bridge is a cable-supported tied arch bridge, with the two ends of the arch terminating at abutments located in the middle of the river.

In the winter after its opening, the bridge developed several cracks and had to be closed for repair. In more recent years, the approach on the Iowa side of the bridge was rebuilt as part of the U.S. 18 bypass that was built around Marquette and McGregor, Iowa.

== See also ==
- List of crossings of the Upper Mississippi River
