= Rodman, Iowa =

- City
- Location of Rodman, Iowa
- Coordinates: 43°01′36″N 94°31′39″W
- Country: USA
- State: Iowa
- County: Palo Alto

Area
  - Total: 0.15 sq mi (0.38 km^{2})
  - Land: 0.15 sq mi (0.38 km^{2})
  - Water: 0 sq mi (0.00 km^{2})
- Elevation: 1,194 ft (364 m)

Population (2020)
  - Total: 31
  - Density: 212.0/sq mi (81.86/km^{2})
- Time zone: UTC-6 (Central (CST))
  - Summer (DST): UTC-5 (CDT)
- ZIP code: 50597
- Area code: 515
- FIPS code: 19-68340
- GNIS feature ID: 2396413

Rodman is a city in Palo Alto County, Iowa, United States. The population was 31 at the time of the 2020 census.

== History ==
Rodman got its start in the early 1880s, following construction of the Burlington, Cedar Rapids and Northern Railway through that territory. It was named for one Mr. Rodman, a retired sailor, who owned the town site.

== Geography ==
According to the United States Census Bureau, the city has a total area of 0.17 square miles (0.44 km^{2}), all land.

== Demographics ==
Historical populations
Year	Pop.	±%
1900	147	—
1910	131	−10.9%
1920	158	+20.6%
1930	167	+5.7%
1940	170	+1.8%
1950	123	−27.6%
1960	144	+17.1%
1970	104	−27.8%
1980	86	−17.3%
1990	56	−34.9%
2000	56	+0.0%
2010	45	−19.6%
2020	31	−31.1%
Source:"U.S. Census website". United States Census Bureau. and Iowa Data Center; Source: U.S. Decennial Census

=== 2020 census ===
As of the census of 2020, there were 31 people, 19 households, and 11 families residing in the city. The population density was 212.0 inhabitants per square mile (81.9/km^{2}). There were 19 housing units at an average density of 129.9 per square mile (50.2/km^{2}). The racial makeup of the city was 93.5% White, 0.0% Black or African American, 0.0% Native American, 0.0% Asian, 0.0% Pacific Islander, 0.0% from other races and 6.5% from two or more races. Hispanic or Latino persons of any race comprised 6.5% of the population.

Of the 19 households, 21.1% of which had children under the age of 18 living with them, 36.8% were married couples living together, 5.3% were cohabitating couples, 31.6% had a female householder with no spouse or partner present and 26.3% had a male householder with no spouse or partner present. 42.1% of all households were non-families. 36.8% of all households were made up of individuals, 5.3% had someone living alone who was 65 years old or older.

The median age in the city was 50.3 years. 6.5% of the residents were under the age of 20; 12.9% were between the ages of 20 and 24; 16.1% were from 25 and 44; 51.6% were from 45 and 64; and 12.9% were 65 years of age or older. The gender makeup of the city was 61.3% male and 38.7% female.

=== 2010 census ===
As of the census of 2010, there were 45 people, 23 households, and 12 families living in the city. The population density was 264.7 inhabitants per square mile (102.2/km^{2}). There were 25 housing units at an average density of 147.1 per square mile (56.8/km^{2}). The racial makeup of the city was 100.0% White.

There were 23 households, of which 21.7% had children under the age of 18 living with them, 39.1% were married couples living together, 4.3% had a female householder with no husband present, 8.7% had a male householder with no wife present, and 47.8% were non-families. 43.5% of all households were made up of individuals, and 8.6% had someone living alone who was 65 years of age or older. The average household size was 1.96 and the average family size was 2.50.

The median age in the city was 50.5 years. 15.6% of residents were under the age of 18; 2.2% were between the ages of 18 and 24; 13.3% were from 25 to 44; 51.1% were from 45 to 64; and 17.8% were 65 years of age or older. The gender makeup of the city was 51.1% male and 48.9% female.

=== 2000 census ===
As of the census of 2000, there were 56 people, 24 households, and 16 families living in the city. The population density was 336.7 inhabitants per square mile (130.0/km^{2}). There were 28 housing units at an average density of 168.4 per square mile (65.0/km^{2}). The racial makeup of the city was 96.43% White, 3.57% from other races.

There were 24 households, out of which 33.3% had children under the age of 18 living with them, 45.8% were married couples living together, 8.3% had a female householder with no husband present, and 33.3% were non-families. 33.3% of all households were made up of individuals, and 12.5% had someone living alone who was 65 years of age or older. The average household size was 2.33 and the average family size was 2.94.

In the city, the population was spread out, with 25.0% under the age of 18, 7.1% from 18 to 24, 25.0% from 25 to 44, 32.1% from 45 to 64, and 10.7% who were 65 years of age or older. The median age was 40 years. For every 100 females, there were 100.0 males. For every 100 females age 18 and over, there were 100.0 males.

The median income for a household in the city was $29,063, and the median income for a family was $31,250. Males had a median income of $28,438 versus $16,250 for females. The per capita income for the city was $15,347. None of the population and none of the families were below the poverty line.

== Education ==
It is within the West Bend–Mallard Community School District. It was established on July 1, 1995, by the merger of the West Bend and Mallard school districts.
