= Fern Valley Township, Palo Alto County, Iowa =

Township in Palo Alto County, Iowa, U.S.

Coordinates: 43°02′N 94°30′W

Fern Valley Township is a township in Palo Alto County, Iowa, USA.
