= Mallard, Iowa =

- City
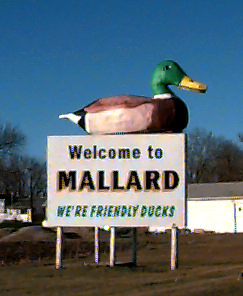
- Greeting sign outside Mallard, Iowa, which reads: "Welcome to Mallard, We're Friendly Ducks".

- Location of Mallard, Iowa
- Coordinates: 42°56′22″N 94°41′00″W
- Country: USA
- State: Iowa
- County: Palo Alto

Area
  - Total: 0.39 sq mi (1.01 km^{2})
  - Land: 0.39 sq mi (1.01 km^{2})
  - Water: 0 sq mi (0.00 km^{2})
- Elevation: 1,221 ft (372 m)

Population (2020)
  - Total: 257
  - Density: 656.3/sq mi (253.38/km^{2})
- Time zone: UTC-6 (Central (CST))
  - Summer (DST): UTC-5 (CDT)
- ZIP code: 50562
- Area code: 712
- FIPS code: 19-48585
- GNIS feature ID: 2395823

Mallard is a city in Palo Alto County, Iowa, United States. The population was 257 at the time of the 2020 census.

== History ==
Mallard got its start circa 1882, following construction of the Des Moines and Fort Dodge Railroad through that territory. The town was named by the railroad president, an avid hunter, from mallard ducks inhabiting the area ponds.

== Geography ==
According to the United States Census Bureau, the city has a total area of 0.41 square miles (1.06 km^{2}), all land.

== Demographics ==
Historical populations
Year	Pop.	±%
1900	292	—
1910	331	+13.4%
1920	431	+30.2%
1930	449	+4.2%
1940	438	−2.4%
1950	399	−8.9%
1960	431	+8.0%
1970	384	−10.9%
1980	407	+6.0%
1990	360	−11.5%
2000	298	−17.2%
2010	274	−8.1%
2020	257	−6.2%
Source:"U.S. Census website". United States Census Bureau. and Iowa Data Center; Source: U.S. Decennial Census

=== 2020 census ===
As of the census of 2020, there were 257 people, 125 households, and 77 families residing in the city. The population density was 656.2 inhabitants per square mile (253.4/km^{2}). There were 148 housing units at an average density of 377.9 per square mile (145.9/km^{2}). The racial makeup of the city was 99.2% White, 0.0% Black or African American, 0.0% Native American, 0.0% Asian, 0.4% Pacific Islander, 0.0% from other races and 0.4% from two or more races. Hispanic or Latino persons of any race comprised 0.8% of the population.

Of the 125 households, 24.8% of which had children under the age of 18 living with them, 47.2% were married couples living together, 5.6% were cohabitating couples, 18.4% had a female householder with no spouse or partner present and 28.8% had a male householder with no spouse or partner present. 38.4% of all households were non-families. 32.8% of all households were made up of individuals, 12.8% had someone living alone who was 65 years old or older.

The median age in the city was 49.6 years. 20.6% of the residents were under the age of 20; 4.3% were between the ages of 20 and 24; 19.1% were from 25 and 44; 31.9% were from 45 and 64; and 24.1% were 65 years of age or older. The gender makeup of the city was 54.5% male and 45.5% female.

=== 2010 census ===
At the 2010 census there were 274 people in 119 households, including 81 families, in the city. The population density was 668.3 inhabitants per square mile (258.0/km^{2}). There were 137 housing units at an average density of 334.1 per square mile (129.0/km^{2}). The racial makup of the city was 96.4% White, 0.4% Native American, 2.9% from other races, and 0.4% from two or more races. Hispanic or Latino of any race were 4.4%.

Of the 119 households 30.3% had children under the age of 18 living with them, 53.8% were married couples living together, 5.9% had a female householder with no husband present, 8.4% had a male householder with no wife present, and 31.9% were non-families. 26.1% of households were one person and 14.3% were one person aged 65 or older. The average household size was 2.30 and the average family size was 2.68.

The median age was 44 years. 24.1% of residents were under the age of 18; 7% were between the ages of 18 and 24; 20.5% were from 25 to 44; 27.8% were from 45 to 64; and 20.8% were 65 or older. The gender makeup of the city was 52.9% male and 47.1% female.

=== 2000 census ===
At the 2000 census there were 298 people in 133 households, including 86 families, in the city. The population density was 783.6 inhabitants per square mile (302.5/km^{2}). There were 143 housing units at an average density of 376.0 per square mile (145.2/km^{2}). The racial makup of the city was 98.66% White, and 1.34% from two or more races.

Of the 133 households 26.3% had children under the age of 18 living with them, 55.6% were married couples living together, 3.8% had a female householder with no husband present, and 35.3% were non-families. 32.3% of households were one person and 21.1% were one person aged 65 or older. The average household size was 2.24 and the average family size was 2.83.

22.1% are under the age of 18, 6.0% from 18 to 24, 21.1% from 25 to 44, 22.8% from 45 to 64, and 27.9% 65 or older. The median age was 46 years. For every 100 females, there were 97.4 males. For every 100 females age 18 and over, there were 96.6 males.

The median household income was $28,056 and the median family income was $31,806. Males had a median income of $26,528 versus $11,917 for females. The per capita income for the city was $16,451. About 12.7% of families and 12.1% of the population were below the poverty line, including 19.0% of those under the age of eighteen and 8.1% of those sixty five or over.

== Education ==
It is within the West Bend–Mallard Community School District. It was established on July 1, 1995, by the merger of the West Bend and Mallard school districts.

== Notable person ==
- Frank Mulroney, relief pitcher for the Boston Red Sox
