= Ruthven, Iowa =

- City
- Location of Ruthven, Iowa
- Coordinates: 43°7′50″N 94°54′1″W
- Country: USA
- State: Iowa
- County: Palo Alto

Area
  - Total: 0.41 sq mi (1.06 km^{2})
  - Land: 0.41 sq mi (1.06 km^{2})
  - Water: 0 sq mi (0.00 km^{2})
- Elevation: 1,437 ft (438 m)

Population (2020)
  - Total: 725
  - Density: 1,778.7/sq mi (686.77/km^{2})
- Time zone: UTC-6 (Central (CST))
  - Summer (DST): UTC-5 (CDT)
- ZIP code: 51358
- Area code: 712
- FIPS code: 19-69330
- GNIS feature ID: 2396460

Ruthven is a city in Palo Alto County, Iowa, United States. The population was 725 at the time of the 2020 census.

== History ==
Ruthven had its start in the year 1878 by the building of the Milwaukee railroad through that territory. It was named for the Ruthven brothers, who owned the town site.

== Geography ==
According to the United States Census Bureau, the city has a total area of 0.42 square miles (1.09 km^{2}), all land.

== Demographics ==
Historical populations
Year	Pop.	±%
1880	73	—
1890	580	+694.5%
1900	787	+35.7%
1910	655	−16.8%
1920	809	+23.5%
1930	739	−8.7%
1940	832	+12.6%
1950	868	+4.3%
1960	712	−18.0%
1970	708	−0.6%
1980	769	+8.6%
1990	707	−8.1%
2000	711	+0.6%
2010	737	+3.7%
2020	725	−1.6%
Source:"U.S. Census website". United States Census Bureau. and Iowa Data Center; Source: U.S. Decennial Census

=== 2020 census ===
As of the census of 2020, there were 725 people, 285 households, and 163 families residing in the city. The population density was 1,778.7 inhabitants per square mile (686.8/km^{2}). There were 336 housing units at an average density of 824.3 per square mile (318.3/km^{2}). The racial makeup of the city was 93.5% White, 1.1% Black or African American, 0.1% Native American, 1.5% Asian, 0.0% Pacific Islander, 0.7% from other races and 3.0% from two or more races. Hispanic or Latino persons of any race comprised 3.6% of the population.

Of the 285 households, 29.8% of which had children under the age of 18 living with them, 43.5% were married couples living together, 10.2% were cohabitating couples, 25.6% had a female householder with no spouse or partner present and 20.7% had a male householder with no spouse or partner present. 42.8% of all households were non-families. 32.6% of all households were made up of individuals, 18.2% had someone living alone who was 65 years old or older.

The median age in the city was 41.1 years. 26.1% of the residents were under the age of 20; 4.1% were between the ages of 20 and 24; 23.6% were from 25 and 44; 21.5% were from 45 and 64; and 24.7% were 65 years of age or older. The gender makeup of the city was 50.1% male and 49.9% female.

=== 2010 census ===
At the 2010 census there were 737 people in 320 households, including 184 families, in the city. The population density was 1,754.8 inhabitants per square mile (677.5/km^{2}). There were 364 housing units at an average density of 866.7 per square mile (334.6/km^{2}). The racial makup of the city was 99.1% White, 0.5% Native American, and 0.4% from two or more races. Hispanic or Latino of any race were 0.8%.

Of the 320 households 25.0% had children under the age of 18 living with them, 43.1% were married couples living together, 8.1% had a female householder with no husband present, 6.3% had a male householder with no wife present, and 42.5% were non-families. 36.6% of households were one person and 21.2% were one person aged 65 or older. The average household size was 2.21 and the average family size was 2.91.

The median age was 42.2 years. 22.3% of residents were under the age of 18; 7.4% were between the ages of 18 and 24; 22.6% were from 25 to 44; 21.5% were from 45 to 64; and 26.2% were 65 or older. The gender makeup of the city was 47.4% male and 52.6% female.

=== 2000 census ===
At the 2000 census there were 711 people in 325 households, including 202 families, in the city. The population density was 1,688.3 inhabitants per square mile (651.9/km^{2}). There were 350 housing units at an average density of 831.1 per square mile (320.9/km^{2}). The racial makup of the city was 97.19% White, 0.42% Native American, 0.28% Asian, and 2.11% from two or more races. Hispanic or Latino of any race were 1.41%.

Of the 325 households 24.0% had children under the age of 18 living with them, 49.8% were married couples living together, 8.6% had a female householder with no husband present, and 37.8% were non-families. 32.3% of households were one person and 18.2% were one person aged 65 or older. The average household size was 2.19 and the average family size was 2.76.

20.0% were under the age of 18, 10.7% from 18 to 24, 22.4% from 25 to 44, 21.1% from 45 to 64, and 25.9% were 65 or older. The median age was 42 years. For every 100 females, there were 92.2 males. For every 100 females age 18 and over, there were 89.7 males.

The median household income was $31,027 and the median family income was $40,469. Males had a median income of $26,094 versus $16,719 for females. The per capita income for the city was $17,079. About 4.7% of families and 9.0% of the population were below the poverty line, including 8.5% of those under age 18 and 9.1% of those age 65 or over.

== Education ==
Ruthven-Ayrshire Community School District serves the community. It was a part of the Ruthven Community School District until July 1, 1983, when it merged into Ruthven-Ayrshire.
