= Locker plant =

Cold storage facility for retail customers

A locker plant is a refrigerated storage facility, typically catering to individuals who keep frozen foods in lockers in the facility's walk-in freezer.

== History ==
During the 1930s commercial-scale refrigeration systems became available, quickly spreading so that[meat processing plants could store slaughtered meat products until they were needed. With the advent of such facilities close to production areas, harvested fruits and vegetables could be preserved by freezing rather than by canning. While home refrigeration increasingly available, it was either based on ice deliveries to an ice box, which could not freeze food or keep it frozen. In later times, small-scale refrigerators became available, with only limited capacity for frozen foods. As early as 1908, the Chico Ice and Cold Storage company in California began to offer rental locker space. The first purpose-built locker plant was built in Parsons, Kansas in 1928. The first combined processing and locker plant was built in 1934 in Creston, Iowa.

Locker plants rented space to individual customers, who could store large quantities of meat and vegetables in individual lockers or enclosures for use by individuals. In many communities the locker plant included an ice plant to serve the icebox market, or was associated with a grocery store or dairy.

As home freezers became more common and supermarkets with fresh meat sections proliferated, the need to keep bulk meat declined, so that by the late 20th century few locker plants remained that catered to retail customers. In 1954 there were 10,854 locker facilities in the United States, a decline from 1953 of one percent. Numbers had peaked in 1951 at 11,608 plants, with the largest numbers in midwestern farming states.
