= Rush Lake Township, Palo Alto County, Iowa =

Township in Palo Alto County, Iowa, U.S.

Coordinates: 42°57′N 94°44′W

Rush Lake Township is a township in Palo Alto County, Iowa, USA.
