= Cylinder, Iowa =

- City
- Location of Cylinder, Iowa
- Coordinates: 43°05′25″N 94°33′04″W
- Country: USA
- State: Iowa
- County: Palo Alto

Area
  - Total: 0.093 sq mi (0.24 km^{2})
  - Land: 0.093 sq mi (0.24 km^{2})
  - Water: 0 sq mi (0.00 km^{2})
- Elevation: 1,191 ft (363 m)

Population (2020)
  - Total: 87
  - Density: 928.8/sq mi (358.63/km^{2})
- Time zone: UTC-6 (Central (CST))
  - Summer (DST): UTC-5 (CDT)
- ZIP code: 50528
- Area code: 712
- FIPS code: 19-17985
- GNIS feature ID: 2393703

Cylinder is a city in Palo Alto County, Iowa, United States. The population was 87 at the time of the 2020 census.

== History ==
The town began in 1885 with the construction of a large hay barn, and soon after a railway siding was built to load the hay. In 1890 a railway depot was constructed, and the town was incorporated in 1900.

The original railway depot was named after nearby Cylinder Creek, which may have received its name after early settlers dropped an engine into the mud and never recovered it.

Professional wrestler Danny Havoc was born in Cylinder, and started wrestling in his family's barn with friends after school.

== Geography ==
According to the United States Census Bureau, the city has a total area of 0.07 square miles (0.18 km^{2}), all land.

== Demographics ==
Historical populations
Year	Pop.	±%
1900	118	—
1910	129	+9.3%
1920	174	+34.9%
1930	157	−9.8%
1940	175	+11.5%
1950	143	−18.3%
1960	161	+12.6%
1970	133	−17.4%
1980	119	−10.5%
1990	112	−5.9%
2000	110	−1.8%
2010	88	−20.0%
2020	87	−1.1%
Source:"U.S. Census website". United States Census Bureau. and Iowa Data Center; Source: U.S. Decennial Census

=== 2020 census ===
As of the census of 2020, there were 87 people, 32 households, and 22 families residing in the city. The population density was 928.8 inhabitants per square mile (358.6/km^{2}). There were 41 housing units at an average density of 437.7 per square mile (169.0/km^{2}). The racial makeup of the city was 90.8% White, 0.0% Black or African American, 0.0% Native American, 0.0% Asian, 0.0% Pacific Islander, 1.1% from other races and 8.0% from two or more races. Hispanic or Latino persons of any race comprised 3.4% of the population.

Of the 32 households, 21.9% of which had children under the age of 18 living with them, 59.4% were married couples living together, 0.0% were cohabitating couples, 15.6% had a female householder with no spouse or partner present and 25.0% had a male householder with no spouse or partner present. 31.2% of all households were non-families. 31.2% of all households were made up of individuals, 12.5% had someone living alone who was 65 years old or older.

The median age in the city was 41.5 years. 20.7% of the residents were under the age of 20; 6.9% were between the ages of 20 and 24; 25.3% were from 25 and 44; 25.3% were from 45 and 64; and 21.8% were 65 years of age or older. The gender makeup of the city was 56.3% male and 43.7% female.

=== 2010 census ===
As of the census of 2010, there were 88 people, 39 households, and 22 families residing in the city. The population density was 1,257.1 inhabitants per square mile (485.4/km^{2}). There were 44 housing units at an average density of 628.6 per square mile (242.7/km^{2}). The racial makeup of the city was 98.9% White and 1.1% from two or more races.

There were 39 households, of which 25.6% had children under the age of 18 living with them, 51.3% were married couples living together, 2.6% had a female householder with no husband present, 2.6% had a male householder with no wife present, and 43.6% were non-families. 33.3% of all households were made up of individuals, and 18% had someone living alone who was 65 years of age or older. The average household size was 2.26 and the average family size was 2.95.

The median age in the city was 47.5 years. 23.9% of residents were under the age of 18; 3.3% were between the ages of 18 and 24; 20.5% were from 25 to 44; 33% were from 45 to 64; and 19.3% were 65 years of age or older. The gender makeup of the city was 55.7% male and 44.3% female.

=== 2000 census ===
As of the census of 2000, there were 110 people, 45 households, and 31 families residing in the city. The population density was 1,625.0 inhabitants per square mile (627.4/km^{2}). There were 49 housing units at an average density of 723.9 per square mile (279.5/km^{2}). The racial makeup of the city was 98.18% White, 0.91% from other races, and 0.91% from two or more races. Hispanic or Latino of any race were 1.82% of the population.

There were 45 households, out of which 35.6% had children under the age of 18 living with them, 57.8% were married couples living together, 6.7% had a female householder with no husband present, and 31.1% were non-families. 26.7% of all households were made up of individuals, and 13.3% had someone living alone who was 65 years of age or older. The average household size was 2.44 and the average family size was 2.97.

In the city, the population was spread out, with 29.1% under the age of 18, 4.5% from 18 to 24, 30.9% from 25 to 44, 23.6% from 45 to 64, and 11.8% who were 65 years of age or older. The median age was 36 years. For every 100 females, there were 107.5 males. For every 100 females age 18 and over, there were 100.0 males.

The median income for a household in the city was $24,750, and the median income for a family was $40,625. Males had a median income of $30,625 versus $14,250 for females. The per capita income for the city was $12,953. There were 21.2% of families and 31.9% of the population living below the poverty line, including 62.5% of under eighteens and none of those over 64.

== Education ==
Emmetsburg Community School District operates public schools.
