= Palo Alto County, Iowa =

County in Iowa, United States

- County
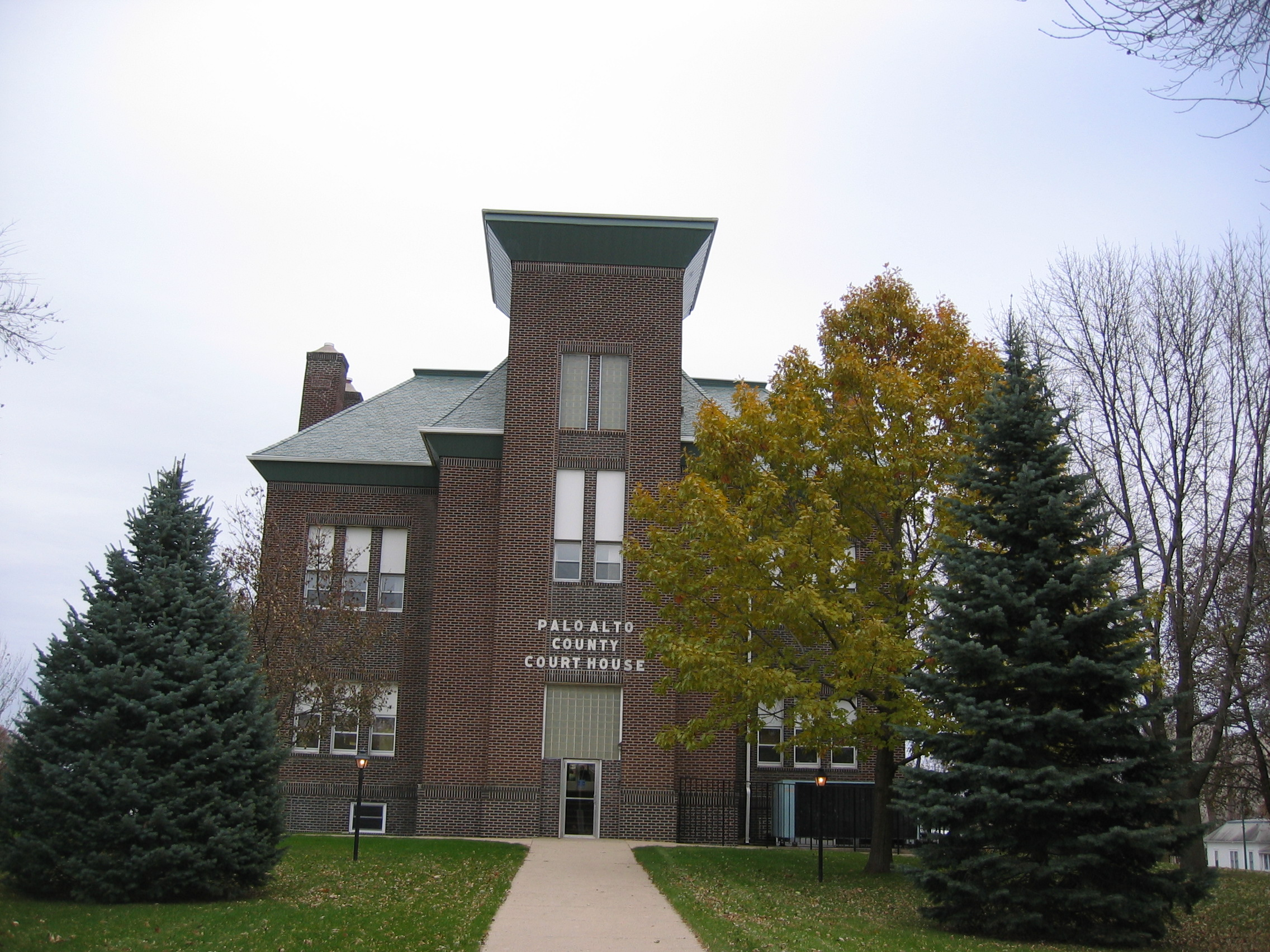
- The Palo Alto County Courthouse in Emmetsburg

- Location within the U.S. state of Iowa
- Coordinates: 43°04′48″N 94°40′51″W
- Country: United States
- State: Iowa
- Founded: January 15, 1851
- Named for: Battle of Palo Alto
- Seat: Emmetsburg
- Largest city: Emmetsburg

Area
  - Total: 569 sq mi (1,470 km^{2})
  - Land: 564 sq mi (1,460 km^{2})
  - Water: 5.6 sq mi (15 km^{2}) 1.0%

Population (2020)
  - Total: 8,996
  - Estimate (2025): 8,899 ▼
  - Density: 16.0/sq mi (6.16/km^{2})
- Time zone: UTC−6 (Central)
  - Summer (DST): UTC−5 (CDT)
- Congressional district: 4th
- Website: paloaltocounty.iowa.gov
- Iowa county number 74

Palo Alto County is a county located in the U.S. state of Iowa. As of the 2020 census, the population was 8,996. The county seat is Emmetsburg. It is named after the Battle of Palo Alto, the first major battle of the Mexican–American War.

== Geography ==
According to the United States Census Bureau, the county has a total area of 569 square miles (1,470 km^{2}), of which 564 square miles (1,460 km^{2}) is land and 5.6 square miles (15 km^{2}) (1.0%) is water.

=== Major highways ===
- U.S. Highway 18
- Iowa Highway 4
- Iowa Highway 15

=== Adjacent counties ===
- Emmet County (north)
- Kossuth County (east)
- Pocahontas County (south)
- Clay County (west)

== Demographics ==
Historical population
Census	Pop.	Note	%±
1860	132		—
1870	1,336		912.1%
1880	4,131		209.2%
1890	9,618		132.8%
1900	14,354		49.2%
1910	13,845		−3.5%
1920	15,486		11.9%
1930	15,398		−0.6%
1940	16,170		5.0%
1950	15,891		−1.7%
1960	14,736		−7.3%
1970	13,289		−9.8%
1980	12,721		−4.3%
1990	10,669		−16.1%
2000	10,147		−4.9%
2010	9,421		−7.2%
2020	8,996		−4.5%
2025 (est.)	8,899	▼	−1.1%
U.S. Decennial Census; 1790–1960 1900–1990; 1990–2000 2010–2020

=== 2020 census ===
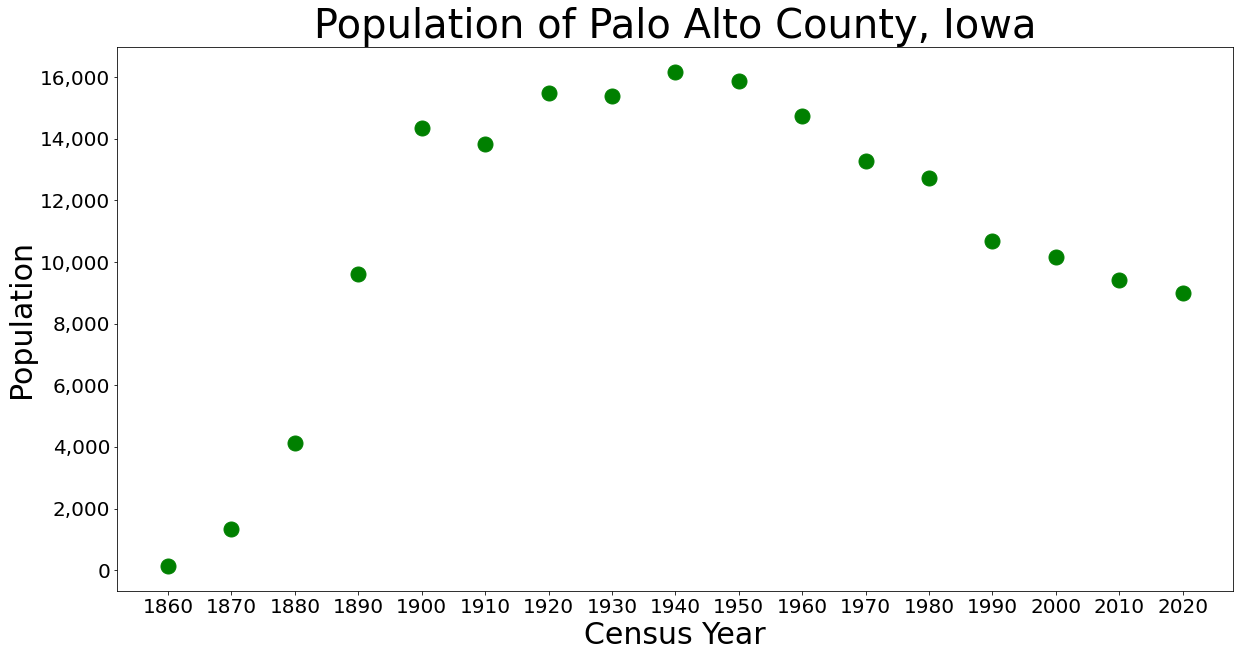
Population of Palo Alto County from the U.S. census data

As of the 2020 census, the county had a population of 8,996, giving it a population density of 15.9/sq mi (6.1/km^{2}). The median age was 43.6 years, with 22.5% of residents under the age of 18 and 23.3% aged 65 years or older. For every 100 females there were 99.9 males, and for every 100 females age 18 and over there were 99.8 males age 18 and over.

The racial makeup of the county was 94.1% White, 0.6% Black or African American, 0.3% American Indian and Alaska Native, 0.4% Asian, 0.1% Native Hawaiian and Pacific Islander, 1.2% from some other race, and 3.4% from two or more races. Hispanic or Latino residents of any race comprised 3.0% of the population.

<0.1% of residents lived in urban areas, while 100.0% lived in rural areas.

There were 3,831 households in the county, of which 26.3% had children under the age of 18 living in them. Of all households, 49.7% were married-couple households, 20.8% were households with a male householder and no spouse or partner present, and 23.0% were households with a female householder and no spouse or partner present. About 33.1% of all households were made up of individuals and 16.0% had someone living alone who was 65 years of age or older.

There were 4,516 housing units, of which 15.2% were vacant; 3,831 were occupied, with 75.5% owner-occupied and 24.5% renter-occupied. The homeowner vacancy rate was 2.7% and the rental vacancy rate was 11.9%.

=== 2010 census ===
As of the 2010 census recorded a population of 9,421 in the county, with a population density of 16.7/sq mi (6.5/km^{2}). There were 4,628 housing units, of which 3,994 were occupied.

=== 2000 census ===
As of the 2000 census, there were 10,147 people, 4,119 households, and 2,673 families residing in the county. The population density was 18 people per square mile (6.9 people/km^{2}). There were 4,631 housing units at an average density of 8 units per square mile (3.1 units/km^{2}). The racial makeup of the county was 98.62% White, 0.09% Black or African American, 0.19% Native American, 0.31% Asian, 0.04% Pacific Islander, 0.19% from other races, and 0.57% from two or more races. 0.76% of the population were Hispanic or Latino of any race.

There were 4,119 households, out of which 28.50% had children under the age of 18 living with them, 56.30% were married couples living together, 5.90% had a female householder with no husband present, and 35.10% were non-families. 30.40% of all households were made up of individuals, and 16.10% had someone living alone who was 65 years of age or older. The average household size was 2.37 and the average family size was 2.96.

In the county, the population was spread out, with 24.00% under the age of 18, 9.50% from 18 to 24, 23.20% from 25 to 44, 21.90% from 45 to 64, and 21.30% who were 65 years of age or older. The median age was 41 years. For every 100 females there were 94.70 males. For every 100 females age 18 and over, there were 92.10 males.

The median income for a household in the county was $32,409, and the median income for a family was $41,808. Males had a median income of $28,344 versus $19,655 for females. The per capita income for the county was $17,733. About 6.60% of families and 10.60% of the population were below the poverty line, including 12.20% of those under age 18 and 9.10% of those age 65 or over.

== Communities ==
=== Cities ===
- Ayrshire
- Curlew
- Cylinder
- Emmetsburg
- Graettinger
- Mallard
- Rodman
- Ruthven
- West Bend (partially)

=== Townships ===
- Booth
- Ellington
- Emmetsburg
- Fairfield
- Fern Valley
- Freedom
- Great Oak
- Highland
- Independence
- Lost Island
- Nevada
- Rush Lake
- Silver Lake
- Vernon
- Walnut
- West Bend

=== Population ranking ===
The population ranking of the following table is based on the 2020 census of Palo Alto County.

† county seat

Rank	City/Town/etc.	Municipal type	Population (2020 Census)
1	† Emmetsburg	City	3,706
2	Graettinger	City	832
3	West Bend (partially in Kossuth County)	City	772 (791 total)
4	Ruthven	City	725
5	Mallard	City	257
6	Ayrshire	City	133
7	Cylinder	City	87
8	Curlew	City	37
9	Rodman	City	31

== Politics ==
Between 1896 and 2008, Palo Alto County was a very reliable bellwether county, backing the nationwide winner in every election except for 1984 and 1988, when a farm crisis caused a loss of Republican support in Iowa amidst an otherwise national landslide for the party in both elections. More recent elections have significantly favored Republicans, as in 2016, Donald Trump became the first nominee of any party to capture at least 65% of the county's vote since Lyndon B. Johnson in his national landslide of 1964. Trump's margin of victory of nearly 36% was the largest in the county since Warren G. Harding in 1920. Trump improved on his first performance in 2020, obtaining almost 68% of the vote in Palo Alto County and grew his margin of victory to over 37%. It was the best vote share for any candidate in the county since Harding a century earlier. Trump did even better again in 2024, taking nearly 72% of the vote and setting a record in Palo Alto County for the largest percentage of the vote ever obtained by a Republican candidate.

United States presidential election results for Palo Alto County, Iowa
Year	Republican		Democratic		Third party(ies)	
Year	No.	%	No.	%	No.	%
1896	1,595	50.00%	1,547	48.50%	48	1.50%
1900	1,908	55.47%	1,477	42.94%	55	1.60%
1904	1,999	63.32%	1,081	34.24%	77	2.44%
1908	1,639	52.82%	1,340	43.18%	124	4.00%
1912	953	30.30%	1,274	40.51%	918	29.19%
1916	1,594	48.49%	1,630	49.59%	63	1.92%
1920	3,904	71.42%	1,467	26.84%	95	1.74%
1924	2,943	49.49%	593	9.97%	2,411	40.54%
1928	3,463	54.49%	2,843	44.74%	49	0.77%
1932	2,378	36.21%	4,094	62.33%	96	1.46%
1936	2,613	35.63%	4,515	61.57%	205	2.80%
1940	3,322	42.47%	4,482	57.30%	18	0.23%
1944	2,772	42.43%	3,726	57.03%	35	0.54%
1948	2,594	39.30%	3,858	58.45%	149	2.26%
1952	4,595	60.48%	2,993	39.40%	9	0.12%
1956	3,795	51.14%	3,624	48.83%	2	0.03%
1960	3,551	48.99%	3,695	50.97%	3	0.04%
1964	2,206	33.19%	4,441	66.81%	0	0.00%
1968	3,114	50.04%	2,874	46.18%	235	3.78%
1972	3,141	51.78%	2,845	46.90%	80	1.32%
1976	2,623	44.43%	3,182	53.90%	99	1.68%
1980	3,025	50.69%	2,463	41.27%	480	8.04%
1984	2,715	46.73%	3,018	51.94%	77	1.33%
1988	2,041	37.36%	3,377	61.82%	45	0.82%
1992	1,789	33.26%	2,374	44.13%	1,216	22.61%
1996	1,817	38.63%	2,371	50.41%	515	10.95%
2000	2,341	48.54%	2,326	48.23%	156	3.23%
2004	2,674	51.51%	2,482	47.81%	35	0.67%
2008	2,294	47.71%	2,428	50.50%	86	1.79%
2012	2,660	54.43%	2,139	43.77%	88	1.80%
2016	3,081	65.51%	1,398	29.73%	224	4.76%
2020	3,370	67.97%	1,519	30.64%	69	1.39%
2024	3,576	71.78%	1,338	26.86%	68	1.36%

== See also ==
- National Register of Historic Places listings in Palo Alto County, Iowa
