= Emmetsburg, Iowa =

Emmetsburg
- City
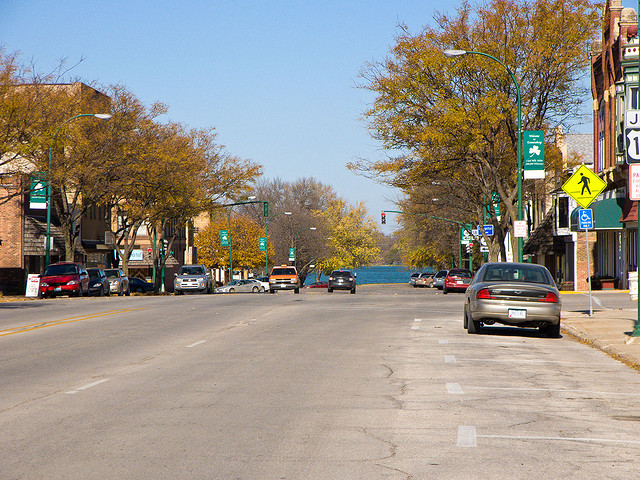
- Street in Emmetsburg
- Nickname: E-BURG
- Motto: "Home of Five Island Lake"
- Location of Emmetsburg, Iowa
- Coordinates: 43°07′15″N 94°40′52″W
- Country: USA
- State: Iowa
- County: Palo Alto

Government
  - Mayor: Patrick Degen

Area
  - Total: 3.96 sq mi (10.25 km^{2})
  - Land: 3.79 sq mi (9.82 km^{2})
  - Water: 0.17 sq mi (0.43 km^{2})
- Elevation: 1,224 ft (373 m)

Population (2020)
  - Total: 3,706
  - Density: 977/sq mi (377.3/km^{2})
- Time zone: UTC-6 (Central (CST))
  - Summer (DST): UTC-5 (CDT)
- ZIP code: 50536
- Area code: 712
- FIPS code: 19-25590
- GNIS feature ID: 2394689
- Website: www.emmetsburg.com

Emmetsburg is a city in Palo Alto County, Iowa, United States. The population was 3,706 at the time of the 2020 census. It is the county seat of Palo Alto County. Emmetsburg is located around the southern bay of Five Island Lake.

== History ==
The town was originally settled by immigrants during the Great Famine of Ireland between 1845 and 1852. Emmetsburg was named after the Dublin-born Irish nationalist Robert Emmet, who was executed at 25 for leading an 1803 rebellion against the British. The city was incorporated on November 17, 1877.

== Geography ==
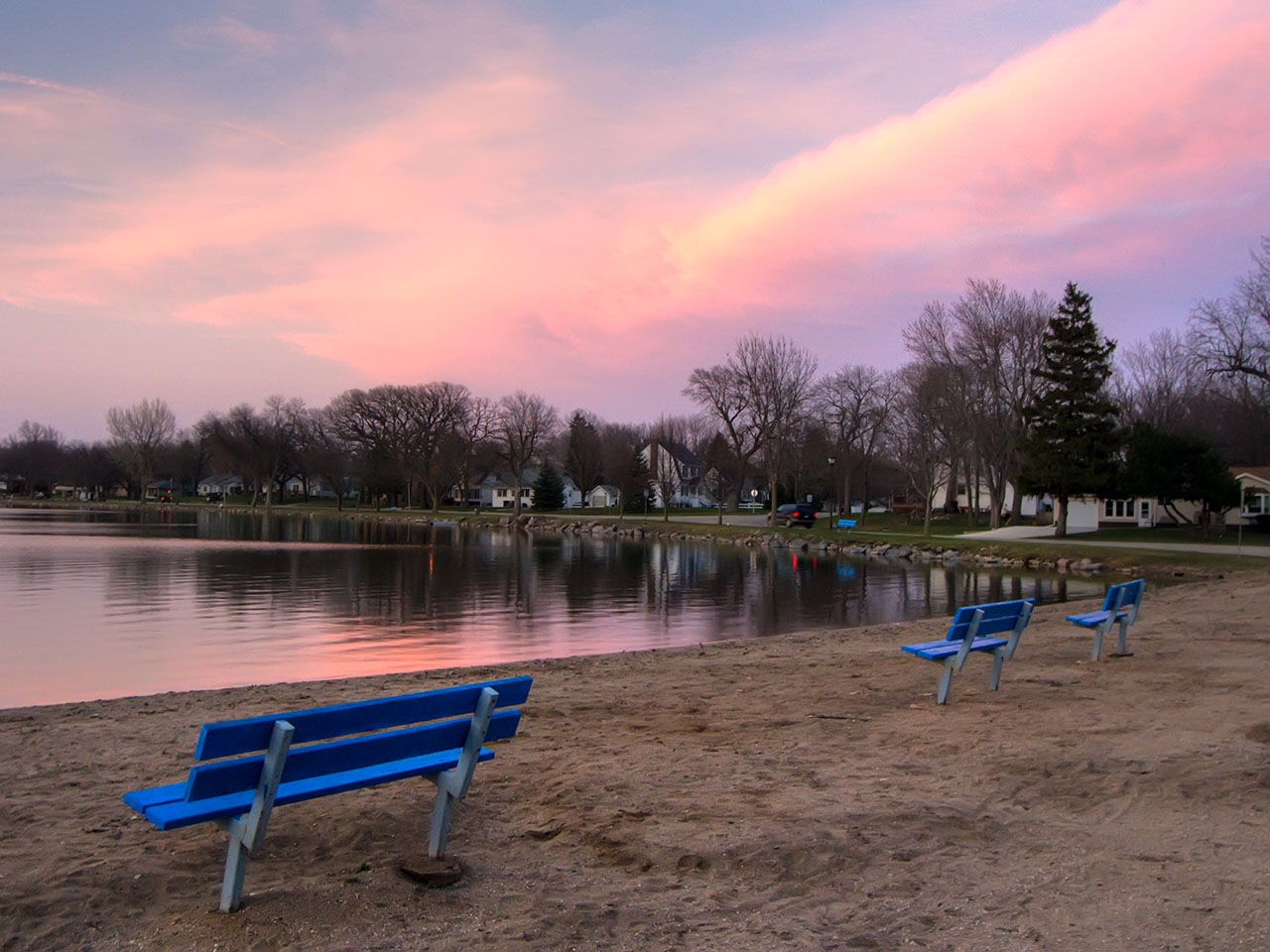
Five Island Lake at sunset

The city lies just to the east of the Des Moines River.

According to the United States Census Bureau, the city has a total area of 3.97 square miles (10.28 km^{2}), of which 3.81 square miles (9.87 km^{2}) is land and 0.16 square miles (0.41 km^{2}) is water.

=== Climate ===
According to the Köppen Climate Classification system, Emmetsburg has a hot-summer humid continental climate, abbreviated "Dfa" on climate maps.

Climate data for Emmetsburg, Iowa, 1991–2020 normals, extremes 1893–present
Month	Jan	Feb	Mar	Apr	May	Jun	Jul	Aug	Sep	Oct	Nov	Dec	Year
Record high °F (°C)	65 (18)	67 (19)	86 (30)	93 (34)	100 (38)	102 (39)	106 (41)	102 (39)	99 (37)	94 (34)	81 (27)	69 (21)	106 (41)
Mean maximum °F (°C)	46.2 (7.9)	51.0 (10.6)	68.0 (20.0)	82.8 (28.2)	89.3 (31.8)	92.8 (33.8)	94.0 (34.4)	91.1 (32.8)	89.3 (31.8)	83.8 (28.8)	66.1 (18.9)	50.0 (10.0)	95.3 (35.2)
Mean daily maximum °F (°C)	26.2 (−3.2)	31.2 (−0.4)	43.8 (6.6)	59.0 (15.0)	71.1 (21.7)	81.5 (27.5)	84.8 (29.3)	82.2 (27.9)	75.7 (24.3)	62.5 (16.9)	45.5 (7.5)	31.7 (−0.2)	57.9 (14.4)
Daily mean °F (°C)	16.8 (−8.4)	21.4 (−5.9)	33.8 (1.0)	47.4 (8.6)	59.8 (15.4)	70.4 (21.3)	74.1 (23.4)	71.3 (21.8)	63.5 (17.5)	50.5 (10.3)	35.5 (1.9)	22.8 (−5.1)	47.3 (8.5)
Mean daily minimum °F (°C)	7.4 (−13.7)	11.5 (−11.4)	23.8 (−4.6)	35.8 (2.1)	48.6 (9.2)	59.3 (15.2)	63.3 (17.4)	60.4 (15.8)	51.2 (10.7)	38.4 (3.6)	25.5 (−3.6)	13.9 (−10.1)	36.6 (2.5)
Mean minimum °F (°C)	−13.9 (−25.5)	−8.9 (−22.7)	1.2 (−17.1)	21.1 (−6.1)	34.4 (1.3)	46.4 (8.0)	53.0 (11.7)	49.2 (9.6)	35.1 (1.7)	22.7 (−5.2)	7.0 (−13.9)	−7.4 (−21.9)	−16.4 (−26.9)
Record low °F (°C)	−33 (−36)	−29 (−34)	−26 (−32)	5 (−15)	22 (−6)	38 (3)	40 (4)	38 (3)	18 (−8)	9 (−13)	−11 (−24)	−24 (−31)	−33 (−36)
Average precipitation inches (mm)	0.68 (17)	0.93 (24)	1.78 (45)	3.70 (94)	4.49 (114)	5.54 (141)	3.82 (97)	4.36 (111)	3.40 (86)	2.37 (60)	1.46 (37)	1.06 (27)	33.59 (853)
Average snowfall inches (cm)	8.0 (20)	8.2 (21)	5.9 (15)	2.6 (6.6)	0.1 (0.25)	0.0 (0.0)	0.0 (0.0)	0.0 (0.0)	0.0 (0.0)	0.3 (0.76)	4.9 (12)	7.1 (18)	37.1 (93.61)
Average precipitation days (≥ 0.01 in)	5.0	5.6	6.9	9.8	12.8	10.9	8.8	9.0	8.8	7.2	5.7	5.5	96
Average snowy days (≥ 0.1 in)	4.6	4.5	2.8	1.1	0.0	0.0	0.0	0.0	0.0	0.2	2.0	3.9	19.1
Source 1: NOAA
Source 2: National Weather Service

== Demographics ==
Historical populations
Year	Pop.	±%
1870	44	—
1880	879	+1897.7%
1890	1,584	+80.2%
1900	2,361	+49.1%
1910	2,325	−1.5%
1920	2,762	+18.8%
1930	2,865	+3.7%
1940	3,374	+17.8%
1950	3,760	+11.4%
1960	3,887	+3.4%
1970	4,150	+6.8%
1980	4,621	+11.3%
1990	3,940	−14.7%
2000	3,958	+0.5%
2010	3,904	−1.4%
2020	3,706	−5.1%
Source:"U.S. Census website". United States Census Bureau. and Iowa Data Center; Source: U.S. Decennial Census

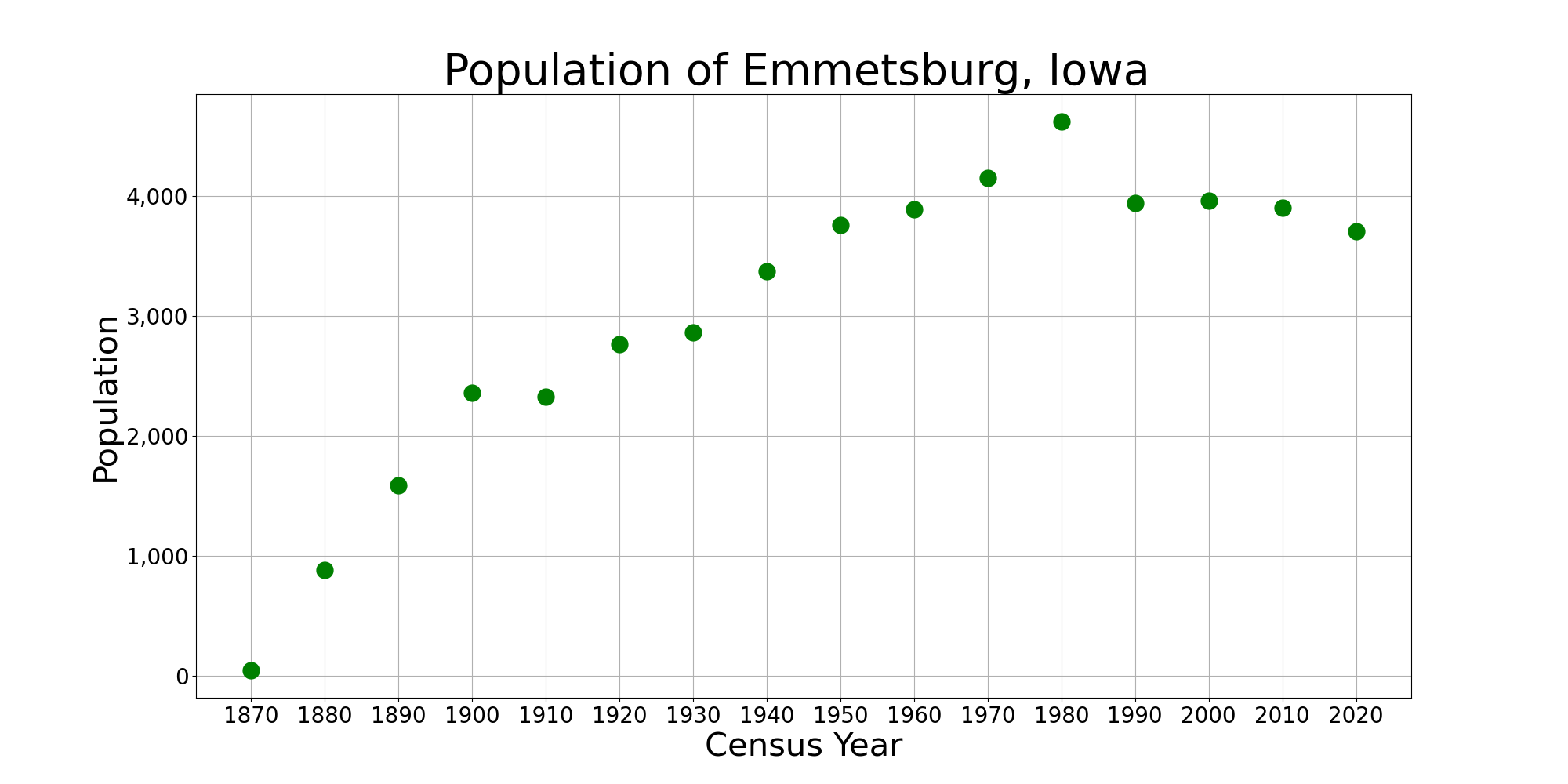
The population of Emmetsburg, Iowa from US census data

=== 2020 census ===
As of the 2020 census, there were 3,706 people, 1,598 households, and 927 families residing in the city. The population density was 977.2 inhabitants per square mile (377.3/km^{2}), and housing density averaged 483.1 per square mile (186.5/km^{2}).

Of households in the city, 25.2% had children under the age of 18 living with them, 43.4% were married couples living together, 6.5% were cohabitating couples, 29.1% had a female householder with no spouse or partner present, and 21.0% had a male householder with no spouse or partner present. 42.0% of all households were non-families, 37.3% of all households were made up of individuals, and 17.6% had someone living alone who was 65 years of age or older.

The median age in the city was 43.2 years. 21.3% of residents were under the age of 18, and 24.7% were 65 years of age or older. 25.0% of residents were under the age of 20; 5.8% were between the ages of 20 and 24; 20.9% were from 25 to 44; and 23.6% were from 45 to 64. The gender makeup of the city was 48.2% male and 51.8% female. For every 100 females there were 93.1 males, and for every 100 females age 18 and over there were 92.0 males age 18 and over.

There were 1,832 housing units, of which 12.8% were vacant. The homeowner vacancy rate was 3.3% and the rental vacancy rate was 15.3%. 0.0% of residents lived in urban areas, while 100.0% lived in rural areas.

Racial composition as of the 2020 census
Race	Number	Percent
White	3,439	92.8%
Black or African American	35	0.9%
American Indian and Alaska Native	13	0.4%
Asian	20	0.5%
Native Hawaiian and Other Pacific Islander	3	0.1%
Some other race	43	1.2%
Two or more races	153	4.1%
Hispanic or Latino (of any race)	122	3.3%

=== 2010 census ===
As of the census of 2010, there were 3,904 people, 1,632 households, and 967 families living in the city. The population density was 1,024.7 inhabitants per square mile (395.6/km^{2}). There were 1,836 housing units at an average density of 481.9 per square mile (186.1/km^{2}). The racial makeup of the city was 96.9% White, 1.0% African American, 0.2% Native American, 0.5% Asian, 0.3% from other races, and 1.1% from two or more races. Hispanic or Latino of any race were 2.0% of the population.

There were 1,632 households, of which 24.9% had children under the age of 18 living with them, 47.0% were married couples living together, 8.8% had a female householder with no husband present, 3.4% had a male householder with no wife present, and 40.7% were non-families. 34.3% of all households were made up of individuals, and 15.7% had someone living alone who was 65 years of age or older. The average household size was 2.22 and the average family size was 2.80.

The median age in the city was 41.4 years. 20.2% of residents were under the age of 18; 12.9% were between the ages of 18 and 24; 19.9% were from 25 to 44; 25.5% were from 45 to 64; and 21.6% were 65 years of age or older. The gender makeup of the city was 48.3% male and 51.7% female.

=== 2000 census ===
As of the census of 2000, there were 3,958 people, 1,620 households, and 941 families living in the city. The population density was 1,046.9 inhabitants per square mile (404.2/km^{2}). There were 1,831 housing units at an average density of 484.3 per square mile (187.0/km^{2}). The racial makeup of the city was 98.59% White, 0.08% African American, 0.18% Native American, 0.53% Asian, 0.13% from other races, and 0.51% from two or more races. Hispanic or Latino of any race were 0.83% of the population.

There were 1,620 households, out of which 24.9% had children under the age of 18 living with them, 49.1% were married couples living together, 6.9% had a female householder with no husband present, and 41.9% were non-families. 34.8% of all households were made up of individuals, and 18.0% had someone living alone who was 65 years of age or older. The average household size was 2.24 and the average family size was 2.90.

Age spread: 20.5% under the age of 18, 13.9% from 18 to 24, 21.6% from 25 to 44, 21.2% from 45 to 64, and 22.7% who were 65 years of age or older. The median age was 41 years. For every 100 females, there were 92.1 males. For every 100 females age 18 and over, there were 85.4 males.

The median income for a household in the city was $31,520, and the median income for a family was $44,554. Males had a median income of $29,830 versus $20,800 for females. The per capita income for the city was $17,599. About 6.9% of families and 13.1% of the population were below the poverty line, including 18.0% of those under age 18 and 9.3% of those age 65 or over.

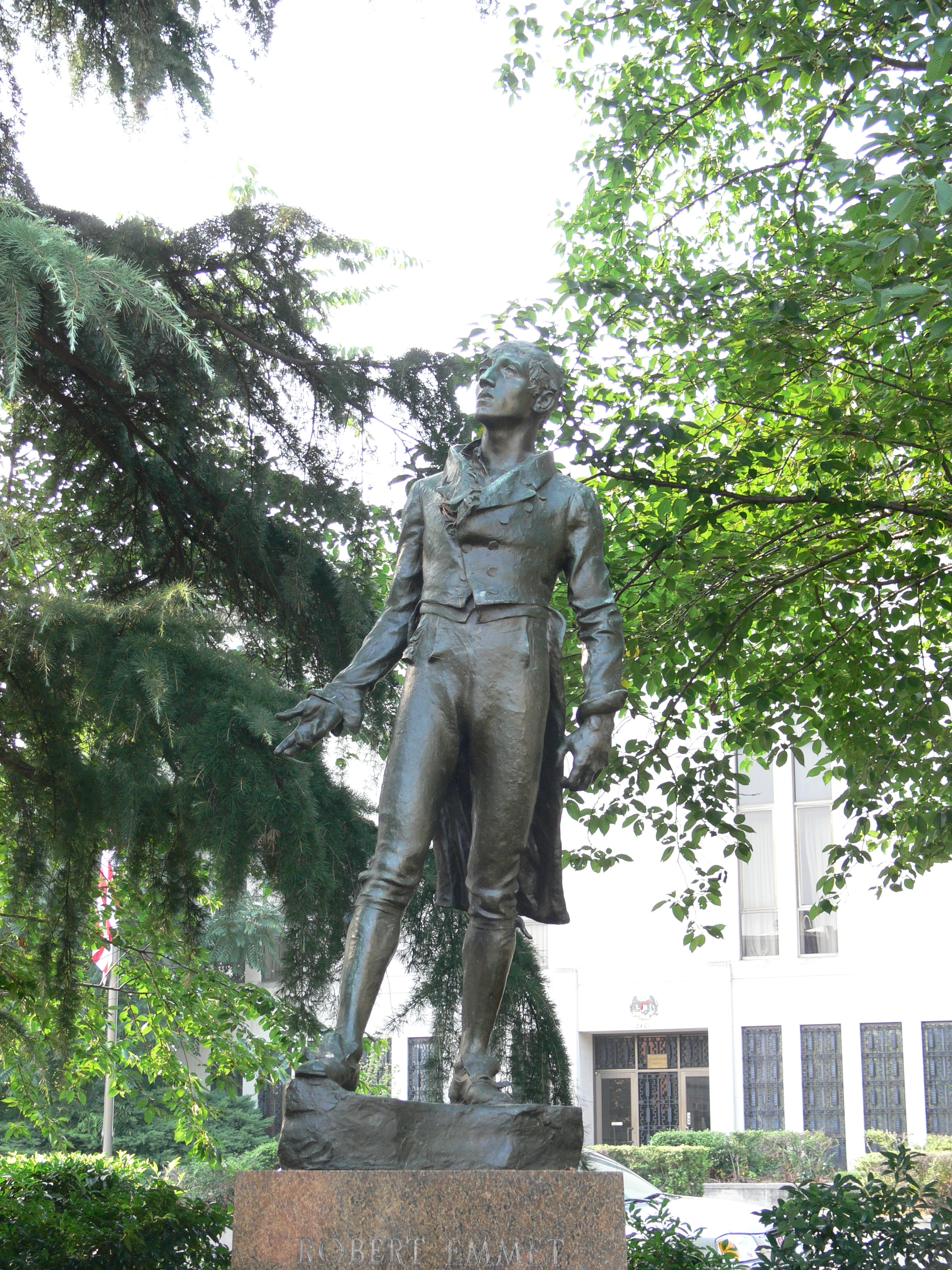
Robert Emmet

== Education ==
Emmetsburg Community School District operates public schools. Emmetsburg also has a branch campus of Iowa Lakes Community College.

== Sports ==
Emmetsburg hosted minor league baseball in 1912. The Emmetsburg team played as members of the Iowa State League, with home games played at Harrison Park.

== Notable people ==
- Thomas Appelquist, theoretical physicist and dean of the Graduate School, Yale University
- Paul Brechler, athletic director of the University of Iowa and commissioner of the WAC
- Paul Emerick, USA international rugby player
- Matthew M. Joyce, former United States federal judge
- Loren Meyer, retired American professional basketball player
- Bruce Nelson, retired National Football League player
- Robert W. Pratt, District Judge for the United States District Court for the Southern District of Iowa
- Curt Pringle, former mayor of Anaheim, California and Speaker of the California State Assembly
