= Denmark Township, Emmet County, Iowa =

Denmark Township
- Township
- Location in Emmet County
- Coordinates: 43°17′52″N 94°30′12″W
- Country: United States
- State: Iowa
- County: Emmet

Area
  - Total: 36.00 sq mi (93.24 km^{2})
  - Land: 36.00 sq mi (93.24 km^{2})
  - Water: 0 sq mi (0 km^{2}) 0%
- Elevation: 1,266 ft (386 m)

Population (2000)
  - Total: 588
  - Density: 17/sq mi (6.4/km^{2})
- Time zone: UTC-6 (CST)
  - Summer (DST): UTC-5 (CDT)
- ZIP codes: 50514, 50578
- GNIS feature ID: 0467703

Denmark Township is one of twelve townships in Emmet County, Iowa, United States. As of the 2000 census, its population was 588.

== History ==
Denmark Township was created in 1883. It was named in honor of a group of Danish families who had arrived shortly before the establishment of the township.

== Geography ==
According to the United States Census Bureau, Denmark Township covers an area of 35.5 square miles (91.94 square kilometers).

=== Cities, towns, villages ===
- Ringsted

=== Unincorporated towns ===
- Forsyth at 43.255518°N 94.473030°W

(This list is based on USGS data and may include former settlements.)

=== Adjacent townships ===
- Armstrong Grove Township (north)
- Swea Township, Kossuth County (northeast)
- Seneca Township, Kossuth County (east)
- Fenton Township, Kossuth County (southeast)
- Independence Township, Palo Alto County (south)
- Vernon Township, Palo Alto County (southwest)
- Jack Creek Township (west)
- Swan Lake Township (northwest)

=== Cemeteries ===
The township contains these three cemeteries: Ringsted Memorial, Saint Johns Lutheran and Saint Pauls.

=== Major highways ===
- Iowa Highway 15

== School districts ==
- Armstrong–Ringsted Community School District

== Political districts ==
- Iowa's 4th congressional district
- State House District 7
- State Senate District 4
