= Sexton, Iowa =

- Census-designated place
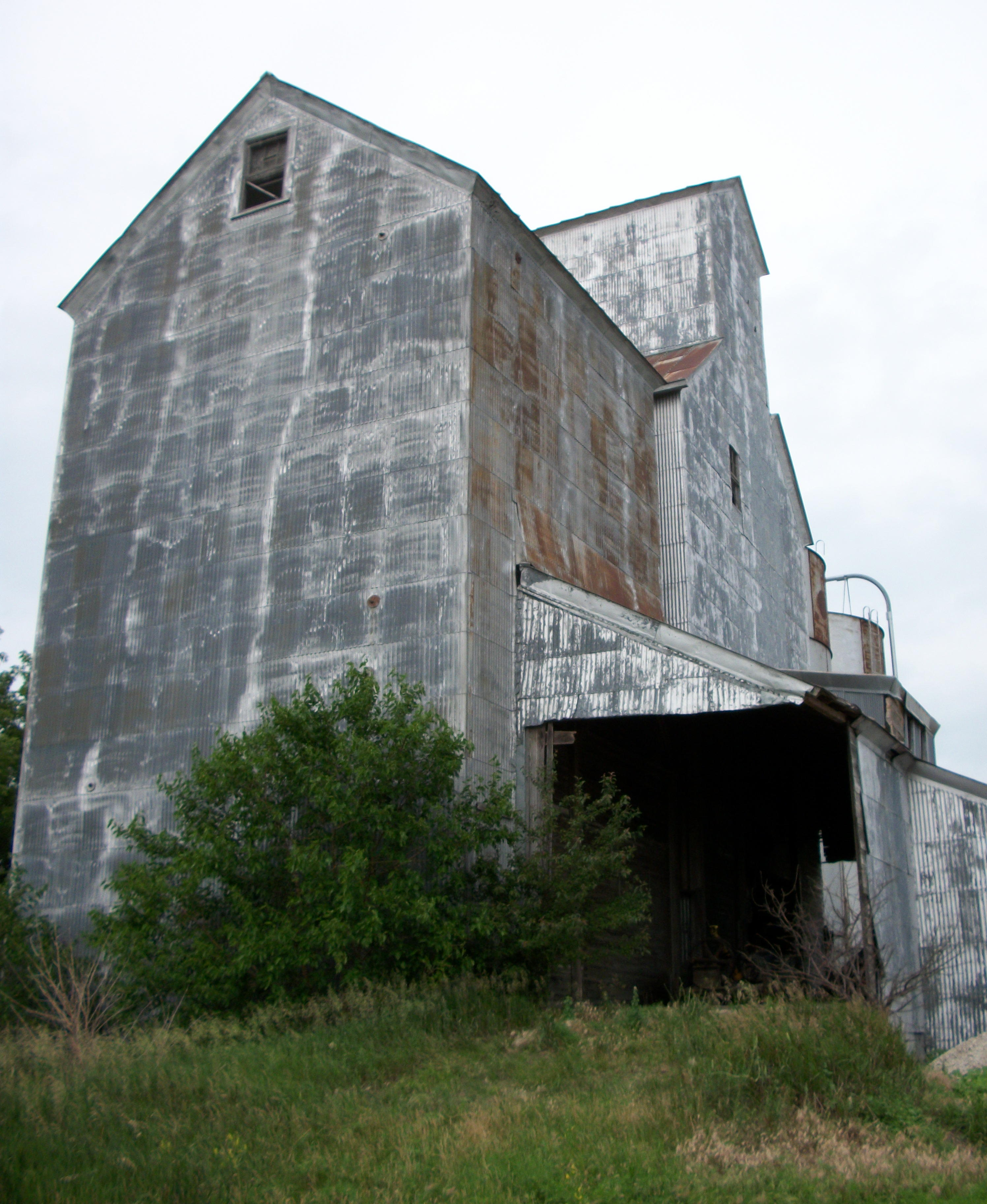
- Sexton elevator

- Location within Iowa Location within the United States
- Coordinates: 43°04′30″N 94°05′21″W
- Country: USA
- State: Iowa
- County: Kossuth
- Townships: Irvington, Prairie
- Post office opened: August 20, 1888

Area
  - Total: 2.20 sq mi (5.70 km^{2})
  - Land: 2.20 sq mi (5.70 km^{2})
  - Water: 0 sq mi (0.00 km^{2})
- Elevation: 1,207 ft (368 m)

Population (2020)
  - Total: 46
  - Density: 20.9/sq mi (8.07/km^{2})
- Time zone: UTC-6 (Central (CST))
  - Summer (DST): UTC-5 (CDT)
- ZIP Code: 50483
- Area code: 515
- GNIS feature ID: 2585487
- FIPS code: 19-71715

Sexton is an unincorporated community and census-designated place (CDP) in Irvington Township, Kossuth County, Iowa, United States. It is located at the intersection of U.S. Route 18 and Kossuth CR P60. As of the 2020 census it had a population of 46.

== History ==
Sexton was platted in 1889. Sexton's population was 42 in 1902.

The town contained a post office from August 1888 until May 1974.

A few houses, a Racer's Bar and Grill and the Sexton elevator remain.

== Geography ==
Sexton is in southeastern Kossuth County, 8 miles (13 km) east of Algona, the county seat, and 5 miles (8 km) west of Wesley. According to the U.S. Census Bureau, the Sexton CDP has an area of 2.2 square miles (5.7 km^{2}), all land. The CDP is on the south side of U.S. Route 18.

== Demographics ==
Historical population
Census	Pop.	Note	%±
2010	37		—
2020	46		24.3%
U.S. Decennial Census

=== 2020 census ===
As of the census of 2020, there were 46 people, 19 households, and 12 families residing in the community. The population density was 20.9 inhabitants per square mile (8.1/km^{2}). There were 19 housing units at an average density of 8.6 per square mile (3.3/km^{2}). The racial makeup of the community was 91.3% White, 4.3% Black or African American, 0.0% Native American, 4.3% Asian, 0.0% Pacific Islander, 0.0% from other races and 0.0% from two or more races. Hispanic or Latino persons of any race comprised 0.0% of the population.

Of the 19 households, 26.3% of which had children under the age of 18 living with them, 63.2% were married couples living together, 5.3% were cohabitating couples, 0.0% had a female householder with no spouse or partner present and 31.6% had a male householder with no spouse or partner present. 36.8% of all households were non-families. 31.6% of all households were made up of individuals, 26.3% had someone living alone who was 65 years old or older.

The median age in the community was 28.5 years. 21.7% of the residents were under the age of 20; 13.0% were between the ages of 20 and 24; 30.4% were from 25 and 44; 17.4% were from 45 and 64; and 17.4% were 65 years of age or older. The gender makeup of the community was 50.0% male and 50.0% female.
