= Harrison Township, Kossuth County, Iowa =

Township in Kossuth County, Iowa, U.S.

Coordinates: 43.3861°N 94.2656°W

Harrison Township is a township in Kossuth County, Iowa, United States.

== History ==
Harrison Township was established in 1890. It is named for President Benjamin Harrison.

== See also ==
- Bancroft County, Iowa
- Crocker County, Iowa
- Larrabee County, Iowa
