= Seneca Township, Kossuth County, Iowa =

Township in Kossuth County, Iowa, U.S.

Coordinates: 43°18′N 94°24′W

Seneca Township is a minor civil division in Kossuth County, Iowa, United States.

== History ==
Seneca Township was previously called Greenwood Township, and divided from Swea Township. Many of its early settlers were farmers, including dairy farmers. Its first post office was established in 1870. State legislator Julius H. Jensen was born in Seneca Township in 1885.

== Demographics ==
As of the 2020 census, Seneca Township had a population of 132 residents in 56 households, of whom 126 were white, four were some other race, two were two or more races, and five were Hispanic or Latino of any race.

== Geography ==
Seneca Township has an area of 35.8 square miles and an elevation of 1,197 feet.

== Government ==
Seneca Township is in district four of the Kossuth County Board of Supervisors, represented by Kyle Stecker. It is represented in the Iowa Senate by Republican Dennis Guth of district four, and in the Iowa House of Representatives by Republican Henry Stone of district seven. In the United States House of Representatives Seneca Township is represented by Republican Randy Feenstra of Iowa's 4th congressional district.

== Education ==
Seneca Township is split between the North Kossuth Community School District and the North Union Community School District.

== See also ==
- Bancroft County, Iowa
- Crocker County, Iowa
- Larrabee County, Iowa
