= Eagle Township, Kossuth County, Iowa =

Eagle Township
- Interactive map of Eagle Township
- Coordinates: 43°27′59″N 094°22′28″W
- Country: United States
- State: Iowa
- County: Kossuth

Eagle Township is a township in Kossuth County, Iowa, United States.

== History ==
Eagle Township was established in 1893.

== See also ==
- Bancroft County, Iowa
- Crocker County, Iowa
- Larrabee County, Iowa
