= Grant Township, Kossuth County, Iowa =

Township in Kossuth County, Iowa, U.S.

Coordinates: 43.4733°N 94.2564°W

Grant Township is a township in Kossuth County, Iowa, United States.

== History ==
Grant Township was established in 1894. It was the last township created in Kossuth County.

== See also ==
- Bancroft County, Iowa
- Crocker County, Iowa
- Larrabee County, Iowa
