= Gerled, Iowa =

- Unincorporated community
- Location within Iowa Location within the United States
- Country: United States
- State: Iowa
- County: Kossuth
- Township: Ledyard
- Elevation: 1,158 ft (353 m)
- Time zone: UTC-6 (Central (CST))
  - Summer (DST): UTC-5 (CDT)
- Area code: 515
- GNIS feature ID: 464558

Gerled is an unincorporated community in Kossuth County, in the U.S. state of Iowa.

== History ==
Gerled was named by conjoining the names of two adjacent townships: German and Ledyard. A post office was established at Gerled in 1902, and remained in operation until it was discontinued in 1951.

Gerled's population was 27 in 1925. The population was 27 in 1940.
