= Springfield Township, Kossuth County, Iowa =

Township in Kossuth County, Iowa, U.S.

Coordinates: 43.4703°N 94.1436°W

Springfield Township is a township in Kossuth County, Iowa, United States.

== History ==
Springfield Township was established in 1891.

== See also ==
- Bancroft County, Iowa
- Crocker County, Iowa
- Larrabee County, Iowa
