= Vernon Township, Humboldt County, Iowa =

Vernon Township
- Township
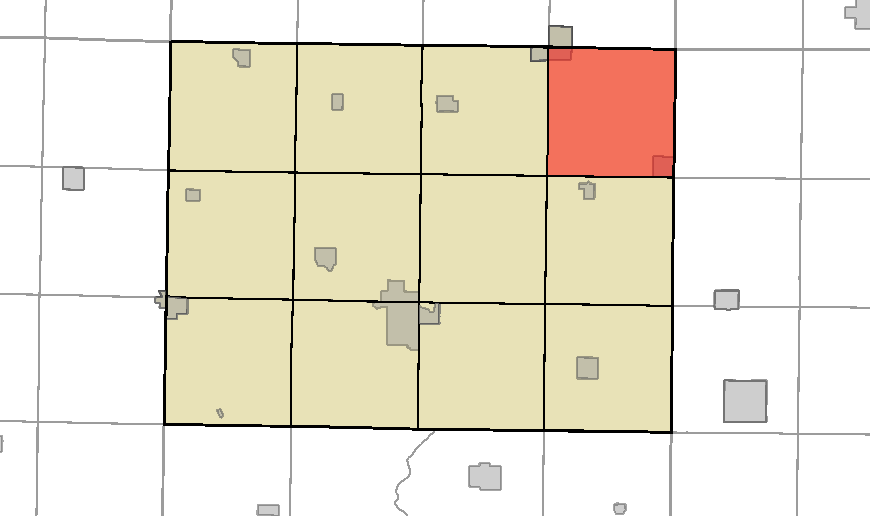
- Location in Humboldt County
- Coordinates: 42°51′53″N 94°01′38″W
- Country: United States
- State: Iowa
- County: Humboldt
- Established: 1865

Area
  - Total: 36.5 sq mi (95 km^{2})
  - Land: 36.5 sq mi (95 km^{2})
  - Water: 0.0 sq mi (0 km^{2})
- Elevation: 1,135 ft (346 m)

Population (2000)
  - Total: 530
  - Density: 15/sq mi (5.8/km^{2})
- Time zone: UTC-6 (CST)
  - Summer (DST): UTC-5 (CDT)
- ZIP codes: 50577 (Renwick); 50560 (Lu Verne)
- GNIS feature ID: 0468862

Vernon Township is one of twelve townships in Humboldt County, Iowa, United States. As of the 2000 census, its population was 530.

== Geography ==
According to the United States Census Bureau, Vernon Township covers an area of 36.5 square miles (95 km^{2}); all of this land.

=== Cities, towns, villages ===
- Renwick
- Lu Verne

=== Adjacent townships ===
- Lu Verne Township, Kossuth County (north)
- Magor Township, Hancock County (northeast)
- Boone Township, Wright County (east)
- Liberty Township, Wright County (southeast)
- Lake Township (south)
- Grove Township (southwest)
- Humboldt Township (west)
- Sherman Township, Kossuth County (northwest)

== Political districts ==
- Iowa's 4th congressional district
- State House District 4

== Cemeteries ==
The township contains Swiss Cemetery and Vernon Township Cemetery.
