= Hebron Township, Kossuth County, Iowa =

Township in Kossuth County, Iowa, U.S.

Coordinates: 43.4650°N 94.0297°W

Hebron Township is a township in Kossuth County, Iowa, United States.

== History ==
Hebron Township was established in 1889.

== See also ==
- Bancroft County, Iowa
- Crocker County, Iowa
- Larrabee County, Iowa
