= German Township, Indiana =

German Township, Indiana may refer to one of the following places in the State of Indiana:

- German Township, Bartholomew County, Indiana
- German Township, Marshall County, Indiana
- German Township, St. Joseph County, Indiana
- German Township, Vanderburgh County, Indiana

== See also ==
- German Township (disambiguation)
