= Galbraith, Iowa =

- Unincorporated community
- Location within Iowa Location within the United States
- Country: United States
- State: Iowa
- County: Kossuth
- Township: Sherman
- Elevation: 1,158 ft (353 m)
- Time zone: UTC-6 (Central (CST))
  - Summer (DST): UTC-5 (CDT)
- Area code: 515
- GNIS feature ID: 464552

Galbraith is an unincorporated community in Kossuth County, in the U.S. state of Iowa.

== History ==
A post office was established at Galbraith in 1902, and remained in operation until it was discontinued in 1913. The community was named for an Iowa senator named Galbraith.

Galbraith's population was 20 in 1925. The population was 10 in 1940.
