= Ramsey Township, Kossuth County, Iowa =

Township in Kossuth County, Iowa, U.S.

Coordinates: 43.3061°N 94.1483°W

Ramsey Township is a township in Kossuth County, Iowa, United States.

== History ==
Ramsey Township was created in 1879. It was named for Wayne Ramsey, a banker and local landowner.

== See also ==
- Bancroft County, Iowa
- Crocker County, Iowa
- Larrabee County, Iowa
