= Irvington, Iowa =

- Census-designated place
- Location within Iowa Location within the United States
- Coordinates: 43°0′22″N 94°11′42″W
- Country: USA
- State: Iowa
- County: Kossuth
- Township: Irvington

Area
  - Total: 1.01 sq mi (2.62 km^{2})
  - Land: 1.01 sq mi (2.62 km^{2})
  - Water: 0 sq mi (0.00 km^{2})
- Elevation: 1,155 ft (352 m)

Population (2020)
  - Total: 36
  - Density: 35.6/sq mi (13.74/km^{2})
- Time zone: UTC-6 (Central (CST))
  - Summer (DST): UTC-5 (CDT)
- ZIP code: 50560
- Area code: 515
- FIPS code: 19-38955
- GNIS feature ID: 2585481

Irvington is an unincorporated community and census-designated place (CDP) in Irvington Township, Kossuth County, Iowa, United States. As of the 2020 census it had a population of 36.

== History ==
"Old" Irvington was founded in 1856. When the Northwestern Railway was being built through Irvington Township in 1881, the townsite was moved and "New" Irvington was laid out. The community was named for author Washington Irving.

Irvington's population was 33 in 1902, and 95 in 1925.

== Geography ==
Irvington is in southern Kossuth County, in the southwest corner of Irvington Township. It sits on a low bluff on the east side of the East Fork of the Des Moines River. It is 5 miles (8 km) south-southeast of Algona, the county seat.

According to the U.S. Census Bureau, the Irvington CDP has an area of 0.94 square miles (2.43 km^{2}), all land.

== Demographics ==
Historical population
Census	Pop.	Note	%±
2010	38		—
2020	36		−5.3%
U.S. Decennial Census

=== 2020 census ===
As of the census of 2020, there were 36 people, 17 households, and 14 families residing in the community. The population density was 35.6 inhabitants per square mile (13.7/km^{2}). There were 17 housing units at an average density of 16.8 per square mile (6.5/km^{2}). The racial makeup of the community was 100.0% White, 0.0% Black or African American, 0.0% Native American, 0.0% Asian, 0.0% Pacific Islander, 0.0% from other races and 0.0% from two or more races. Hispanic or Latino persons of any race comprised 0.0% of the population.

Of the 17 households, 17.6% of which had children under the age of 18 living with them, 70.6% were married couples living together, 0.0% were cohabitating couples, 11.8% had a female householder with no spouse or partner present and 17.6% had a male householder with no spouse or partner present. 17.6% of all households were non-families. 17.6% of all households were made up of individuals, 5.9% had someone living alone who was 65 years old or older.

The median age in the community was 39.5 years. 33.3% of the residents were under the age of 20; 11.1% were between the ages of 20 and 24; 8.3% were from 25 and 44; 22.2% were from 45 and 64; and 25.0% were 65 years of age or older. The gender makeup of the community was 58.3% male and 41.7% female.
