= St. Benedict, Iowa =

- Census-designated place
- Location within Iowa Location within the United States
- Coordinates: 43°02′38″N 94°03′39″W
- Country: USA
- State: Iowa
- County: Kossuth
- Township: Prairie

Area
  - Total: 0.77 sq mi (1.99 km^{2})
  - Land: 0.77 sq mi (1.99 km^{2})
  - Water: 0 sq mi (0.00 km^{2})
- Elevation: 1,266 ft (386 m)

Population (2020)
  - Total: 31
  - Density: 40/sq mi (15.6/km^{2})
- Time zone: UTC-6 (Central (CST))
  - Summer (DST): UTC-5 (CDT)
- Area code: 515
- FIPS code: 19-69825
- GNIS feature ID: 2585485

St. Benedict or Saint Benedict is an unincorporated community and census-designated place (CDP) in Prairie Township, Kossuth County, Iowa, United States. As of the 2020 census it had a population of 31.

St. Benedict was platted in 1899.

== Geography ==
The community is located in southeastern Kossuth County, 10 miles (16 km) southeast of Algona, the county seat. According to the U.S. Census Bureau, the CDP has an area of 0.77 square miles (2.0 km^{2}), all land.

== Demographics ==
Historical population
Census	Pop.	Note	%±
2010	39		—
2020	31		−20.5%
U.S. Decennial Census

=== 2020 census ===
As of the census of 2020, there were 31 people, 18 households, and 9 families residing in the community. The population density was 40.4 inhabitants per square mile (15.6/km^{2}). There were 20 housing units at an average density of 26.1 per square mile (10.1/km^{2}). The racial makeup of the community was 100.0% White, 0.0% Black or African American, 0.0% Native American, 0.0% Asian, 0.0% Pacific Islander, 0.0% from other races and 0.0% from two or more races. Hispanic or Latino persons of any race comprised 0.0% of the population.

Of the 18 households, 11.1% of which had children under the age of 18 living with them, 50.0% were married couples living together, 0.0% were cohabitating couples, 33.3% had a female householder with no spouse or partner present and 16.7% had a male householder with no spouse or partner present. 50.0% of all households were non-families. 50.0% of all households were made up of individuals, 16.7% had someone living alone who was 65 years old or older.

The median age in the community was 52.3 years. 6.5% of the residents were under the age of 20; 0.0% were between the ages of 20 and 24; 35.5% were from 25 and 44; 32.3% were from 45 and 64; and 25.8% were 65 years of age or older. The gender makeup of the community was 54.8% male and 45.2% female.
