= Greenwood Township, Kossuth County, Iowa =

Township in Kossuth County, Iowa, U.S.

Coordinates: 43.2986°N 94.2656°W

Greenwood Township is a township in Kossuth County, Iowa, United States.

== History ==
Greenwood Township was created in 1869. It was the seat for Crocker County, Iowa during its brief existence from 1870 to 1871.

== See also ==
- Bancroft County, Iowa
- Larrabee County, Iowa
