= McHose =

McHose is a surname. Notable people with the surname include:

- Alison Littell McHose (born 1965), American politician
- James McHose (1849–1927), American politician
