= Portland Township =

Portland Township may refer to:

== Canada ==
- Portland Township, now part of South Frontenac, Ontario

== United States ==
- Portland Township, Ashley County, Arkansas, in Ashley County, Arkansas
- Portland Township, Whiteside County, Illinois
- Portland Township, Cerro Gordo County, Iowa
- Portland Township, Kossuth County, Iowa
- Portland Township, Plymouth County, Iowa
- Portland Township, Michigan
- Portland Township, Deuel County, South Dakota, in Deuel County, South Dakota

== See also ==
- Portland (disambiguation)
