= Ramsey Township =

Ramsey Township may refer to the following townships in the United States:

- Ramsey Township, Fayette County, Illinois
- Ramsey Township, Kossuth County, Iowa
