= German Township, Kossuth County, Iowa =

Township in Kossuth County, Iowa, U.S.

Coordinates: 43.2989°N 94.0294°W

German Township is a township in Kossuth County, Iowa, United States.

== History ==
German Township was organized in 1887. It was originally settled chiefly by Germans, hence the name.

== See also ==
- Bancroft County, Iowa
- Crocker County, Iowa
- Larrabee County, Iowa
