= German Township =

German Township may refer to:

== Illinois ==
- German Township, Richland County, Illinois

== Indiana ==
- German Township, Bartholomew County, Indiana
- German Township, Marshall County, Indiana
- German Township, St. Joseph County, Indiana
- German Township, Vanderburgh County, Indiana

== Iowa ==
- German Township, Grundy County, Iowa
- German Township, Kossuth County, Iowa

== Kansas ==
- German Township, Smith County, Kansas, in Smith County, Kansas

== North Dakota ==
- German Township, Dickey County, North Dakota, in Dickey County, North Dakota

== Ohio ==
- German Township, Auglaize County, Ohio
- German Township, Clark County, Ohio
- German Township, Fulton County, Ohio
- German Township, Harrison County, Ohio
- German Township, Montgomery County, Ohio

== Pennsylvania ==
- German Township, Fayette County, Pennsylvania
- German Township or Germantown Township, Pennsylvania, a former township in Philadelphia County

== South Dakota ==
- German Township, Hutchinson County, South Dakota, in Hutchinson County, South Dakota
