= Swea Township, Kossuth County, Iowa =

Township in Kossuth County, Iowa, U.S.

Coordinates: 43.3864°N 94.3836°W

Swea Township is a township in Kossuth County, Iowa, United States.

== History ==
Swea Township was established in 1886. As the name Swea suggests, the township was originally settled largely by Swedes.

== See also ==
- Bancroft County, Iowa
- Crocker County, Iowa
- Larrabee County, Iowa
