= Cresco Township, Kossuth County, Iowa =

Township in Kossuth County, Iowa, U.S.

Coordinates: 43.0383°N 94.2767°W

Cresco Township is a township in Kossuth County, Iowa, United States.

== History ==
Cresco Township was organized in 1858.
