= Dietrich-Bowen House =

Historic house in Indiana, United States

- U.S. National Register of Historic Places
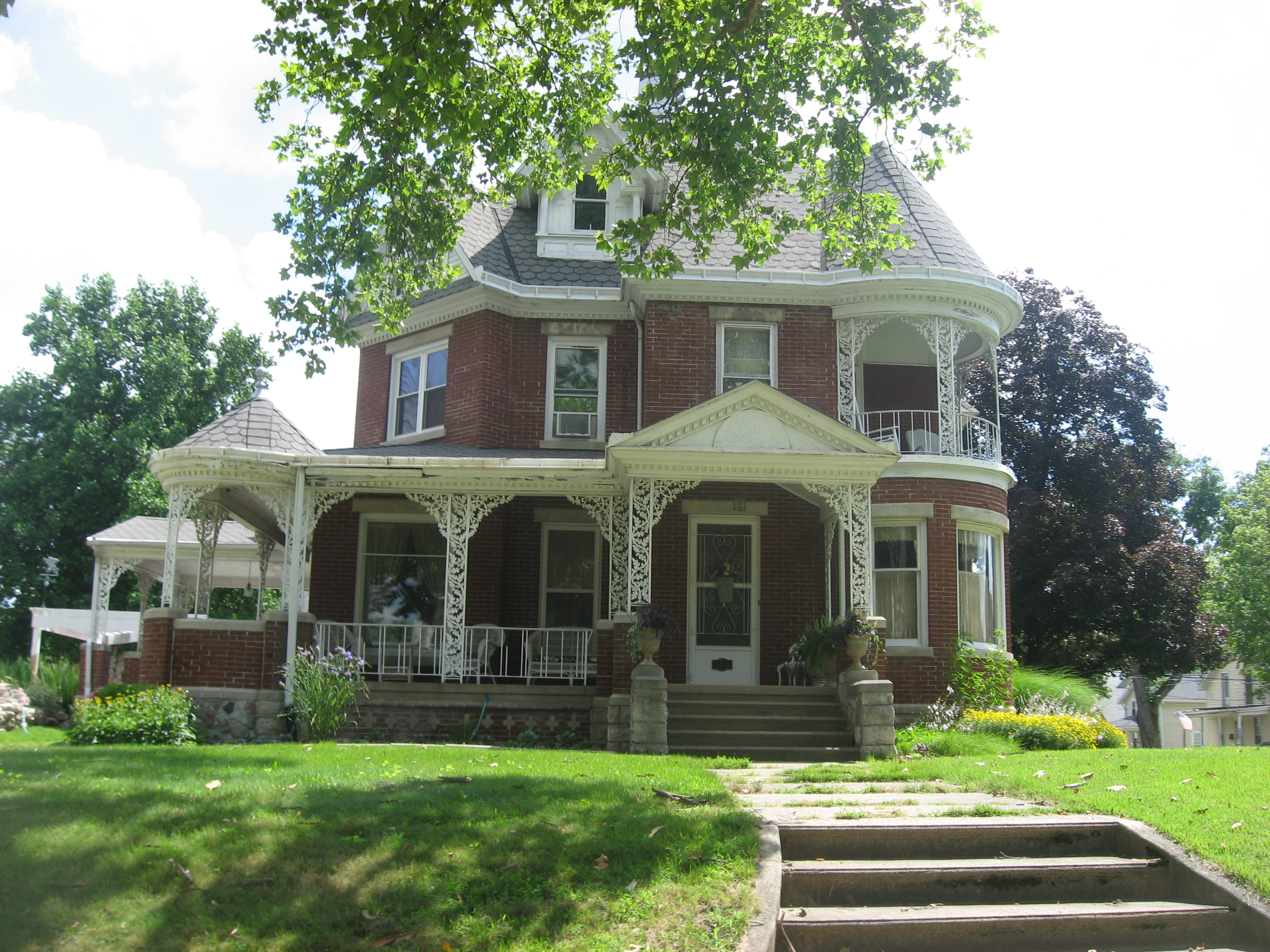
- Dietrich-Bowen House, July 2013

- Location within Indiana Location within the United States
- Location: 304 N. Center St., Bremen, Indiana
- Coordinates: 41°26′55″N 86°8′46″W
- Area: less than one acre
- Built: 1900
- Architectural style: Queen Anne
- NRHP reference No.: 78000023
- Added to NRHP: November 21, 1978

Dietrich-Bowen House, also known as Governor Bowen House, is a historic home located in Bremen, Indiana, United States. It was built in 1900, and is a 2 1/2-story, Queen Anne style brick dwelling. It rests on a fieldstone foundation and has a truncated hipped roof with a gable dormer. The house features corner turrets with conical roofs and a large verandah with a roof supported by iron grillwork. It was the residence of Governor Otis R. Bowen from 1953 to 1973.

It was listed on the National Register of Historic Places in 1978.
