= Union Township, Kossuth County, Iowa =

Township in Kossuth County, Iowa, U.S.

Coordinates: 43.1194°N 94.2761°W

Union Township is a township in Kossuth County, Iowa, United States.

== History ==
Union Township was organized in 1883.
