= Burt Township, Kossuth County, Iowa =

Township in Kossuth County, Iowa, U.S.

Coordinates: 43.2117°N 94.2656°W

Burt Township is a township in Kossuth County, Iowa, United States.

== History ==
Burt Township was organized in 1883.
