= Bremen, Indiana =

- Town
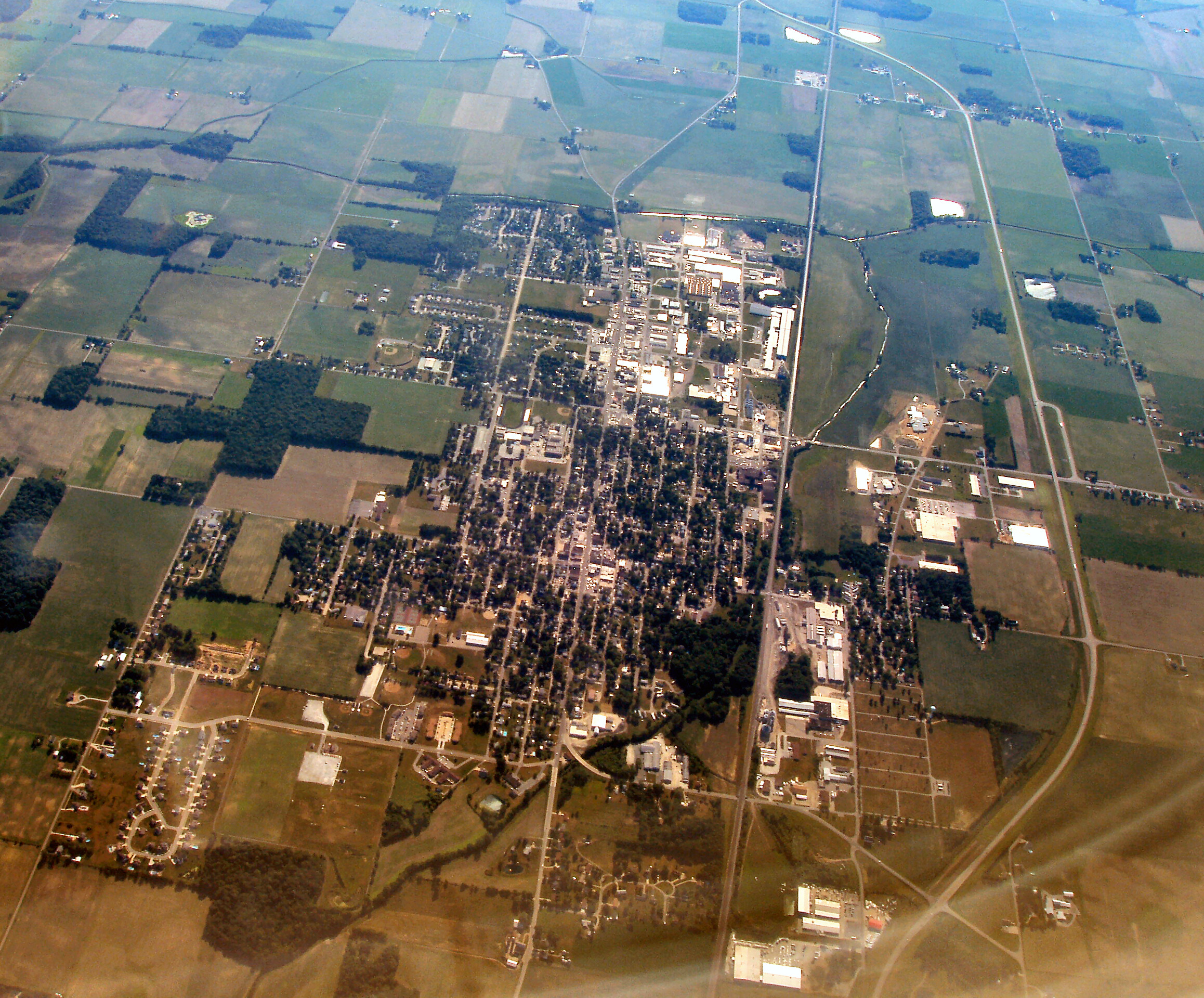
- Bremen from the air

- Icon
- Nickname: The Mint City
- Location in Marshall County, Indiana
- Coordinates: 41°26′50″N 86°08′58″W
- Country: United States
- State: Indiana
- County: Marshall
- Township: German

Area
  - Total: 2.84 sq mi (7.35 km^{2})
  - Land: 2.83 sq mi (7.34 km^{2})
  - Water: 0.0039 sq mi (0.01 km^{2})
- Elevation: 850 ft (260 m)

Population (2020)
  - Total: 4,696
  - Density: 1,657.2/sq mi (639.83/km^{2})
- Demonym: Bremenite
- Time zone: UTC-5 (EST)
  - Summer (DST): UTC-4 (EDT)
- ZIP code: 46506
- Area code: 574
- FIPS code: 18-07318
- GNIS ID: 431479
- Website: www.townofbremen.com

Bremen (/ˈbriːmən/ BREE-mən) is a town in German Township, Marshall County, Indiana, United States. The population was 4,696 at the 2020 census.

== History ==
Bremen was platted and laid out in 1851. A large portion of the early settlers being natives of Germany caused the name Bremen to be selected.

The Bremen Water Tower and Dietrich-Bowen House are listed on the National Register of Historic Places.

== Geography ==
Bremen is located in northeastern Marshall County at 41°26′50″N 86°08′58″W. It is at an elevation of 854 feet (260 m).

U.S. Route 6 passes through the north side of the town on a bypass; it leads east 8 miles (13 km) to Nappanee and west 18 miles (29 km) to Walkerton. Indiana State Road 331 passes through the center of Bremen on North Bowen Avenue and Plymouth Street; it leads north 15 miles (24 km) to Mishawaka and south 12 miles (19 km) to Bourbon. State Road 106 passes east to west through the center of Bremen on Plymouth Street and Douglas Road. Plymouth, the Marshall county seat, is 15 miles (24 km) to the southwest.

According to the U.S. Census Bureau, Bremen has a total area of 2.84 square miles (7.36 km^{2}), of which 0.004 square miles (0.010 km^{2}), or 0.14%, are water. The Yellow River, here near its headwaters, passes along the western edge of the town, flowing south and west toward the Kankakee River, part of the Illinois River watershed.

== Demographics ==
Historical population
Census	Pop.	Note	%±
1880	1,028		—
1890	1,076		4.7%
1900	1,671		55.3%
1910	2,008		20.2%
1920	2,084		3.8%
1930	2,105		1.0%
1940	2,179		3.5%
1950	2,664		22.3%
1960	3,026		13.6%
1970	3,487		15.2%
1980	3,565		2.2%
1990	4,725		32.5%
2000	4,486		−5.1%
2010	4,588		2.3%
2020	4,696		2.4%
U.S. Decennial Census

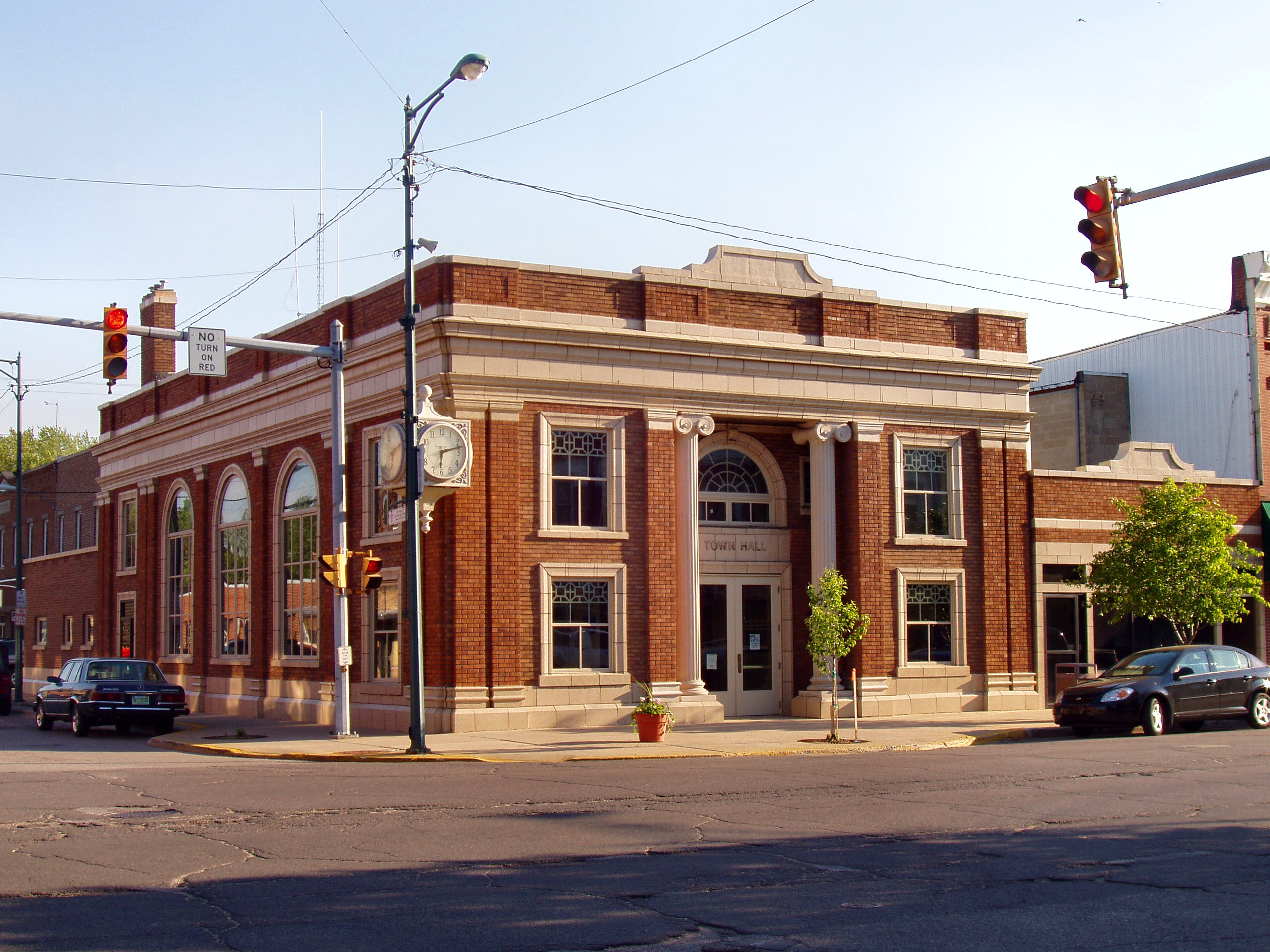
Bremen's town hall

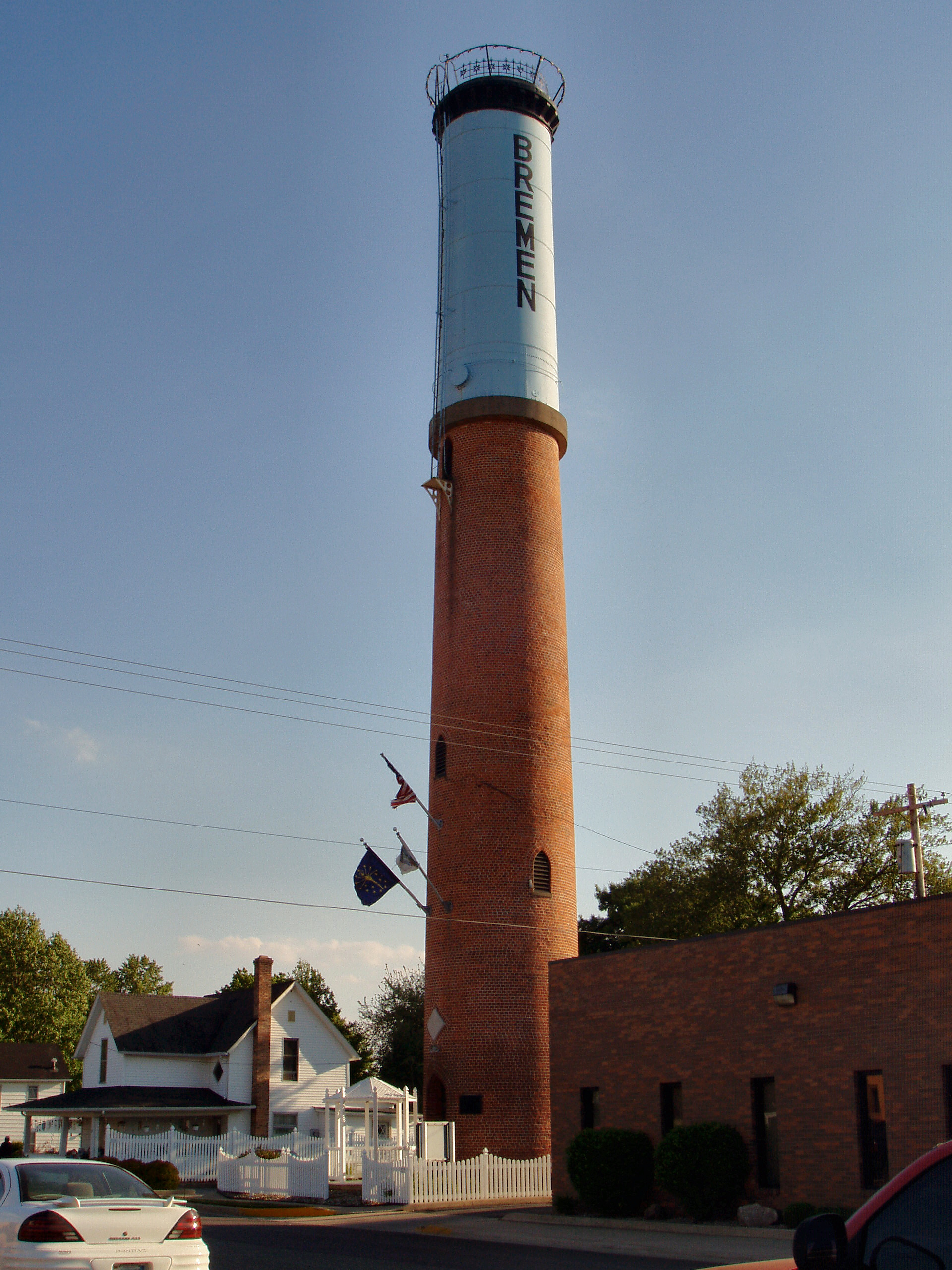
Bremen's historic water tower

=== 2020 census ===
As of the 2020 census, Bremen had a population of 4,696. The median age was 37.8 years. 25.7% of residents were under the age of 18 and 17.4% of residents were 65 years of age or older. For every 100 females there were 96.6 males, and for every 100 females age 18 and over there were 92.8 males age 18 and over.

0.0% of residents lived in urban areas, while 100.0% lived in rural areas.

There were 1,856 households in Bremen, of which 33.1% had children under the age of 18 living in them. Of all households, 45.0% were married-couple households, 20.5% were households with a male householder and no spouse or partner present, and 27.2% were households with a female householder and no spouse or partner present. About 32.4% of all households were made up of individuals and 14.1% had someone living alone who was 65 years of age or older.

There were 1,961 housing units, of which 5.4% were vacant. The homeowner vacancy rate was 1.0% and the rental vacancy rate was 4.5%.

Racial composition as of the 2020 census
Race	Number	Percent
White	3,623	77.2%
Black or African American	18	0.4%
American Indian and Alaska Native	25	0.5%
Asian	24	0.5%
Native Hawaiian and Other Pacific Islander	1	0.0%
Some other race	533	11.4%
Two or more races	472	10.1%
Hispanic or Latino (of any race)	1,145	24.4%

=== 2010 census ===
As of the 2010 census, there were 4,588 people, 1,736 households, and 1,155 families living in the town. The population density was 1,686.8 inhabitants per square mile (651.3/km^{2}). There were 1,922 housing units at an average density of 706.6 per square mile (272.8/km^{2}). The racial makeup of the town was 86.5% White, 0.4% African American, 0.2% Native American, 0.3% Asian, 11.1% from other races, and 1.5% from two or more races. Hispanic or Latino of any race were 18.0% of the population.

There were 1,736 households, of which 36.7% had children under the age of 18 living with them, 50.5% were married couples living together, 10.8% had a female householder with no husband present, 5.2% had a male householder with no wife present, and 33.5% were non-families. 30.1% of all households were made up of individuals, and 15.7% had someone living alone who was 65 years of age or older. The average household size was 2.58 and the average family size was 3.20.

The median age in the town was 36.6 years. 27.6% of residents were under the age of 18; 8.3% were between the ages of 18 and 24; 25% were from 25 to 44; 23.2% were from 45 to 64; and 16% were 65 years of age or older. The gender makeup of the town was 47.8% male and 52.2% female.

=== 2000 census ===
As of the 2000 census, there were 4,486 people, 1,689 households, and 1,177 families living in the town. The population density was 1,967.8 inhabitants per square mile (759.8/km^{2}). There were 1,791 housing units at an average density of 785.6 per square mile (303.3/km^{2}). The racial makeup of the town was 91.42% White, 0.16% African American, 0.38% Native American, 0.31% Asian, 0.04% Pacific Islander, 6.53% from other races, and 1.16% from two or more races. Hispanic or Latino of any race were 12.02% of the population.

There were 1,689 households, out of which 34.5% had children under the age of 18 living with them, 56.0% were married couples living together, 9.9% had a female householder with no husband present, and 30.3% were non-families. 26.9% of all households were made up of individuals, and 13.3% had someone living alone who was 65 years of age or older. The average household size was 2.59 and the average family size was 3.14.

In the town, the population was spread out, with 27.3% under the age of 18, 9.2% from 18 to 24, 27.4% from 25 to 44, 20.2% from 45 to 64, and 15.9% who were 65 years of age or older. The median age was 35 years. For every 100 females, there were 92.9 males. For every 100 females age 18 and over, there were 88.9 males.

The median income for a household in the town was $40,185, and the median income for a family was $47,768. Males had a median income of $32,443 versus $21,902 for females. The per capita income for the town was $17,073. About 4.2% of families and 6.5% of the population were below the poverty line, including 7.4% of those under age 18 and 5.3% of those age 65 or over.

== Economy ==
Bremen supports light and heavy industry in the form of fiberglass and custom cabinet manufacturing, RV and van painting, and roller bearing manufacture. Much of its industry supports the large RV manufacturing in the area, especially in nearby Nappanee and Elkhart.

== Education ==
The town has a lending library, the Bremen Public Library.

== Notable people ==
- Otis Bowen, MD, Indiana 44th governor (1973–1981) and Secretary of Health and Human Services under President Ronald Reagan (1985–1989).
- Erin Coffel, professional softball player
- Brad Stine, conservative Christian comedian and actor
