= Bremen Water Tower =

- U.S. National Register of Historic Places
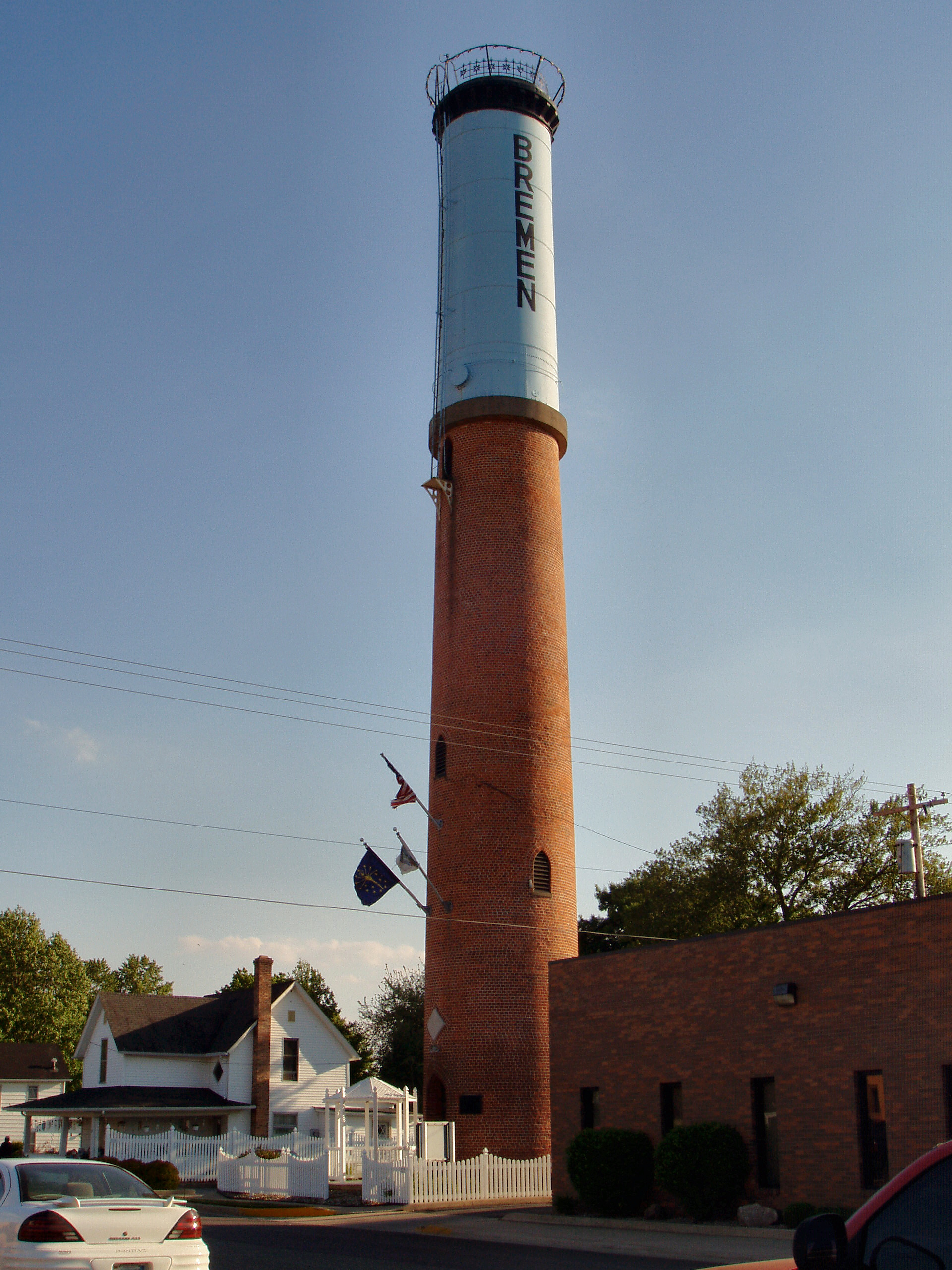
- Bremen Water Tower, May 2005

- Location within Indiana Location within the United States
- Location: Western side of the 100 block of S. Jackson St., Bremen, Indiana
- Coordinates: 41°26′46″N 86°8′52″W
- Area: 0.004 acres (0.0016 ha)
- Built: 1892
- Built by: Morgan, George C.; Madden, James D.
- Architectural style: Second Gothic Revival
- NRHP reference No.: 12001152
- Added to NRHP: January 9, 2013

Bremen Water Tower, also known as Bremen Water Works Standpipe, is a historic water tower located at Bremen, Indiana. It was built in 1892, and consists of a 68 foot tall brick base with Second Gothic Revival style design elements topped by a 36 foot tall tank. The base sits on a limestone foundation and is 13 feet in diameter. It was taken out of commission in 1955. It remains a community icon and was named an American Historic Water Landmark in 1975.

It was listed on the National Register of Historic Places in 2013.
