= Bancroft, Iowa =

- City
- Location of Bancroft, Iowa
- Coordinates: 43°17′34″N 94°13′03″W
- Country: United States
- State: Iowa
- County: Kossuth

Area
  - Total: 0.56 sq mi (1.46 km^{2})
  - Land: 0.56 sq mi (1.46 km^{2})
  - Water: 0 sq mi (0.00 km^{2})
- Elevation: 1,181 ft (360 m)

Population (2020)
  - Total: 699
  - Density: 1,236.4/sq mi (477.38/km^{2})
- Time zone: UTC-6 (Central (CST))
  - Summer (DST): UTC-5 (CDT)
- ZIP code: 50517
- Area code: 515
- FIPS code: 19-04420
- GNIS feature ID: 2394058

Bancroft is a city in Kossuth County, Iowa, United States. The population was 699 at the time of the 2020 census.

== History ==
Bancroft was platted in 1881. It was named for George Bancroft, an American historian, government official, and diplomat.

== Geography ==
According to the United States Census Bureau, the city has a total area of 0.55 square miles (1.42 km^{2}), all land.

== Demographics ==
Historical populations
Year	Pop.	±%
1890	657	—
1900	839	+27.7%
1910	830	−1.1%
1920	902	+8.7%
1930	854	−5.3%
1940	959	+12.3%
1950	901	−6.0%
1960	1,000	+11.0%
1970	1,103	+10.3%
1980	1,082	−1.9%
1990	857	−20.8%
2000	808	−5.7%
2010	732	−9.4%
2020	699	−4.5%
Source:"U.S. Census website". United States Census Bureau. and Iowa Data Center; Source: U.S. Decennial Census

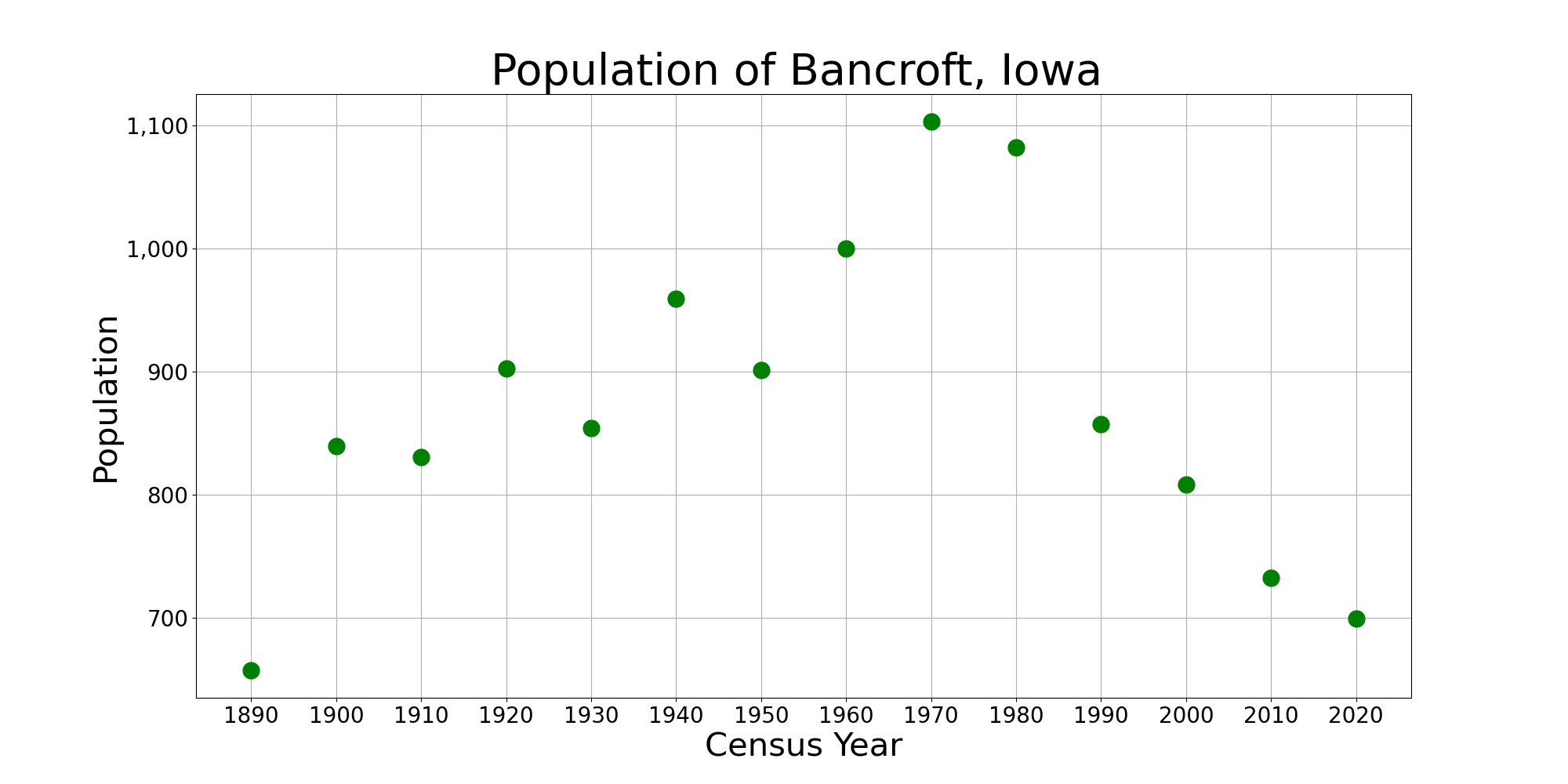
The population of Bancroft, Iowa from US census data

=== 2020 census ===
As of the census of 2020, there were 699 people, 324 households, and 178 families residing in the city. The population density was 1,245.2 inhabitants per square mile (480.8/km^{2}). There were 349 housing units at an average density of 621.7 per square mile (240.0/km^{2}). The racial makeup of the city was 93.0% White, 0.9% Black or African American, 0.0% Native American, 0.1% Asian, 0.0% Pacific Islander, 2.1% from other races and 3.9% from two or more races. Hispanic or Latino persons of any race comprised 4.7% of the population.

Of the 324 households, 25.9% of which had children under the age of 18 living with them, 40.4% were married couples living together, 7.7% were cohabitating couples, 26.5% had a female householder with no spouse or partner present and 25.3% had a male householder with no spouse or partner present. 45.1% of all households were non-families. 39.8% of all households were made up of individuals, 21.3% had someone living alone who was 65 years old or older.

The median age in the city was 47.6 years. 21.2% of the residents were under the age of 20; 4.6% were between the ages of 20 and 24; 22.9% were from 25 and 44; 24.2% were from 45 and 64; and 27.2% were 65 years of age or older. The gender makeup of the city was 50.6% male and 49.4% female.

=== 2010 census ===
As of the census of 2010, there were 732 people, 311 households, and 189 families living in the city. The population density was 1,330.9 inhabitants per square mile (513.9/km^{2}). There were 360 housing units at an average density of 654.5 per square mile (252.7/km^{2}). The racial makeup of the city was 98.8% White, 0.1% African American, 0.3% Native American, 0.1% from other races, and 0.7% from two or more races. Hispanic or Latino of any race were 0.3% of the population.

There were 311 households, of which 27.0% had children under the age of 18 living with them, 47.9% were married couples living together, 8.4% had a female householder with no husband present, 4.5% had a male householder with no wife present, and 39.2% were non-families. 36.0% of all households were made up of individuals, and 17.4% had someone living alone who was 65 years of age or older. The average household size was 2.26 and the average family size was 2.94.

The median age in the city was 44.9 years. 25.5% of residents were under the age of 18; 4.6% were between the ages of 18 and 24; 20% were from 25 to 44; 24.3% were from 45 to 64; and 25.5% were 65 years of age or older. The gender makeup of the city was 50.4% male and 49.6% female.

=== 2000 census ===
As of the census of 2000, there were 808 people, 339 households, and 208 families living in the city. The population density was 1,484.2 inhabitants per square mile (573.1/km^{2}). There were 372 housing units at an average density of 683.3 per square mile (263.8/km^{2}). The racial makeup of the city was 99.50% White, 0.37% from other races, and 0.12% from two or more races. Hispanic or Latino of any race were 1.24% of the population.

There were 339 households, out of which 28.6% had children under the age of 18 living with them, 50.7% were married couples living together, 8.6% had a female householder with no husband present, and 38.6% were non-families. 37.2% of all households were made up of individuals, and 21.8% had someone living alone who was 65 years of age or older. The average household size was 2.27 and the average family size was 2.99.

In the city, the population was spread out, with 25.9% under the age of 18, 6.4% from 18 to 24, 22.3% from 25 to 44, 18.3% from 45 to 64, and 27.1% who were 65 years of age or older. The median age was 42 years. For every 100 females, there were 82.8 males. For every 100 females age 18 and over, there were 82.6 males.

The median income for a household in the city was $31,055, and the median income for a family was $35,625. Males had a median income of $29,688 versus $18,929 for females. The per capita income for the city was $15,312. About 9.1% of families and 12.7% of the population were below the poverty line, including 17.7% of those under age 18 and 8.6% of those age 65 or over.

== Education ==
It is a part of the North Kossuth Community School District.

== Notable people ==
- Joe Hatten, MLB pitcher
- Denis Menke, MLB player, coach, and two-time National League All-Star
- Randy Rahe, college basketball coach
