= Buffalo Township, Kossuth County, Iowa =

Township in Kossuth County, Iowa, U.S.

Coordinates: 43.2125°N 94.0294°W

Buffalo Township is a township in Kossuth County, Iowa, United States.

== History ==
Buffalo Township was organized in 1884.
