= James McHose =

American politician (1849–1927)

Member of the Iowa House of Representatives from the 53rd district
- In office January 13, 1913 – January 10, 1915
- Preceded by: William W. Goodykoontz
- Succeeded by: John F. Herman

Personal details
- Born: August 25, 1849 Davenport, Iowa, U.S.
- Died: June 17, 1927 (aged 77) Boone, Iowa, U.S.
- Party: Republican
- Occupation: bricklayer educator lawyer

James Buritt McHose (August 25, 1849 – June 17, 1927) was an American politician.

James McHose was born in Davenport, Iowa, on August 25, 1849, to parents Samuel McHose and Mary Dillin. He was one of eight children, and of Scotch-Irish, German, and English descent. The McHose family moved to Geneseo, Illinois, where James attended school. He then followed his father and grandfather into the bricklaying industry, and later became a teacher. After graduating from the Washington University School of Law in 1874, McHose moved to Nevada, Iowa, where he practiced law for four years, before returning to work as a bricklayer. In 1889, McHose moved to Boone, Iowa, where he founded Boone Clay Works, from which he retired in 1910. He was a member and former president of the Iowa Brick and Tile Association.

After moving to Boone, McHose served on the city council. McHose was elected to the Iowa House of Representatives in 1912 as a Republican, holding the District 53 seat from January 13, 1913 to January 10, 1915. During his single term on the Iowa General Assembly, McHose proposed the establishment of Larrabee County, which was opposed by Kossuth County residents. He was additionally a member of Boone's Board of Park Commissioners, and led the commission as president at the time of his death in Boone on June 17, 1927.

James McHose acquired land for Boone's McHose Park, where the final statue of Theodore Roosevelt designed by Vincenzo Miserendino was later placed. In 2010, Donovan Olson acquired the McHose home in Boone and began restoration work.
