= Fenton Township, Kossuth County, Iowa =

Township in Kossuth County, Iowa, U.S.

Coordinates: 43.21°N 94.38°W

Fenton Township is a township in Kossuth County, Iowa, in the United States.

== History ==
Fenton Township was organized in 1873.
