= Lu Verne Township, Kossuth County, Iowa =

Township in Kossuth County, Iowa, U.S.

Coordinates: 42.9511°N 94.0306°W

Lu Verne Township is a township in Kossuth County, Iowa, United States.

== History ==
Lu Verne Township (formerly Luverne) was organized in 1882.
