= Portland Township, Kossuth County, Iowa =

Township in Kossuth County, Iowa, U.S.

Coordinates: 43.2103°N 94.1431°W

Portland Township is a township in Kossuth County, Iowa, United States.

== History ==
Portland Township was organized in 1869.
