= German Township, Marshall County, Indiana =

German Township
- Township
- Location in Marshall County
- Coordinates: 41°26′12″N 86°08′37″W
- Country: United States
- State: Indiana
- County: Marshall

Government
  - Type: Indiana township

Area
  - Total: 62.1 sq mi (161 km^{2})
  - Land: 61.48 sq mi (159.2 km^{2})
  - Water: 0.62 sq mi (1.6 km^{2}) 1.00%
- Elevation: 833 ft (254 m)

Population (2020)
  - Total: 8,937
  - Density: 144.8/sq mi (55.9/km^{2})
- ZIP codes: 46504, 46506, 46550, 46563
- GNIS feature ID: 0453326

German Township is one of ten townships in Marshall County, Indiana, United States. As of the 2020 census, its population was 8,937 (up from 8,902 at 2010) and it contained 3,504 housing units.

== History ==
German Township was organized in 1838, and named for the fact the township originally was settled chiefly by Germans.

== Geography ==
According to the 2010 census, the township has a total area of 62.1 square miles (161 km^{2}), of which 61.48 square miles (159.2 km^{2}) (or 99.00%) is land and 0.62 square miles (1.6 km^{2}) (or 1.00%) is water.

=== Cities, towns, villages ===
- Bremen

=== Major highways ===
- US 6
- SR 106
- SR 331

== Education ==
- Bremen Public Schools

German Township residents may obtain a free library card from the Bremen Public Library in Bremen.

== Political districts ==
- Indiana's 2nd congressional district
- State House District 23
- State Senate District 9
