= Irvington Township, Kossuth County, Iowa =

Township in Kossuth County, Iowa, U.S.

Coordinates: 43.0386°N 94.1481°W

Irvington Township is a township located in Kossuth County, Iowa, United States.

== History ==
Irvington Township was organized in 1857.
