= Prairie Township, Kossuth County, Iowa =

Township in Kossuth County, Iowa, U.S.

Coordinates: 43.0386°N 94.0300°W

Prairie Township is a township in Kossuth County, Iowa, United States.

== History ==
Prairie Township was organized in 1882. It takes its name from the Prairie Creek.
