= Kossuth County, Iowa =

County in Iowa, United States

- County
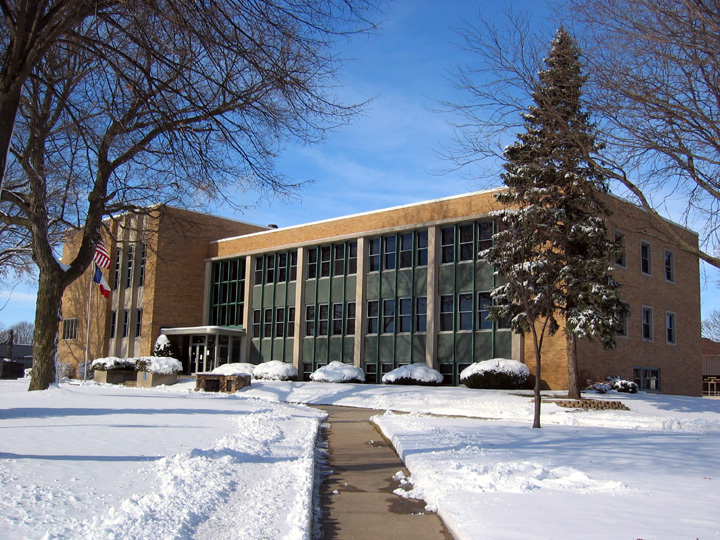
- The Kossuth County Courthouse in Algona

- Location within the U.S. state of Iowa
- Coordinates: 43°12′18″N 94°12′20″W
- Country: United States
- State: Iowa
- Founded: January 15, 1851
- Named for: Lajos Kossuth
- Seat: Algona
- Largest city: Algona

Area
  - Total: 974.3 sq mi (2,523 km^{2})
  - Land: 973 sq mi (2,520 km^{2})
  - Water: 1.6 sq mi (4.1 km^{2}) 0.2%

Population (2020)
  - Total: 14,828
  - Estimate (2025): 14,322 ▼
  - Density: 15.2/sq mi (5.88/km^{2})
- Time zone: UTC−6 (Central)
  - Summer (DST): UTC−5 (CDT)
- Congressional district: 4th
- Website: kossuthcounty.iowa.gov
- Iowa county number 55

Kossuth County (/kəˈsuːθ/) is a county in the U.S. state of Iowa. As of the 2020 census, the population was 14,828. The county seat and the largest city is Algona.

== History ==
Kossuth County was founded on January 15, 1851. It was named after Lajos Kossuth, Regent-President of Hungary who went into exile to America following the war of independence of Hungary from the Habsburg Dynasty. The county was enlarged northward in 1857 by the inclusion of the former Bancroft County. Crocker County was created from the northern 12 townships of Kossuth County in 1870, but the Iowa Supreme Court later ruled the act unconstitutional because the county contained less than the required 432 square miles; its territory was restored to Kossuth County after 19 months. Another attempt to create a new county called Larrabee County failed in 1914.

== Geography ==
According to the United States Census Bureau, the county has an area of 974 sq mi (2,520 km^{2}), of which 973 sq mi (2,520 km^{2}) is land and 1.6 sq mi (4.1 km^{2}) (0.2%) is water. It is Iowa's largest county by area.

=== Major highways ===
- U.S. Highway 18
- U.S. Highway 169
- Iowa Highway 9
- Iowa Highway 15
- Iowa Highway 17

=== Adjacent counties ===
- Martin County, Minnesota (north)
- Faribault County, Minnesota (north)
- Winnebago County (northeast)
- Hancock County (southeast)
- Humboldt County (south)
- Palo Alto County (southwest)
- Emmet County (northwest)

=== National protected area ===
- Union Slough National Wildlife Refuge

== Demographics ==
Historical population
| Census | Pop. | Note | %± |
|---|---|---|---|
| 1860 | 416 | | — |
| 1870 | 3,351 | | 705.5% |
| 1880 | 6,178 | | 84.4% |
| 1890 | 13,120 | | 112.4% |
| 1900 | 22,720 | | 73.2% |
| 1910 | 21,971 | | −3.3% |
| 1920 | 25,082 | | 14.2% |
| 1930 | 25,452 | | 1.5% |
| 1940 | 26,630 | | 4.6% |
| 1950 | 26,241 | | −1.5% |
| 1960 | 25,314 | | −3.5% |
| 1970 | 22,937 | | −9.4% |
| 1980 | 21,891 | | −4.6% |
| 1990 | 18,591 | | −15.1% |
| 2000 | 17,163 | | −7.7% |
| 2010 | 15,543 | | −9.4% |
| 2020 | 14,828 | | −4.6% |
| 2025 (est.) | 14,322 | ▼ | −3.4% |
U.S. Decennial Census; 1790–1960 1900–1990; 1990–2000 2010–2020

=== 2020 census ===
Kossuth County, Iowa racial and ethnic composition Note: the US Census treats Hispanic/Latino as an ethnic category. This table excludes Latinos from the racial categories and assigns them to a separate category. Hispanics/Latinos may be of any race.
| Race | Number | Percent |
|---|---|---|
| White alone (NH) | 13,758 | 92.78% |
| Black or African American alone (NH) | 71 | 0.48% |
| Native American or Alaska Native alone (NH) | 9 | 0.06% |
| Asian alone (NH) | 71 | 0.48% |
| Pacific Islander alone (NH) | 3 | 0.02% |
| Other race alone (NH) | 15 | 0.10% |
| Mixed race or multiracial (NH) | 298 | 2.01% |
| Hispanic or Latino (any race) | 603 | 4.07% |
| Total | 14,828 | 100.00% |

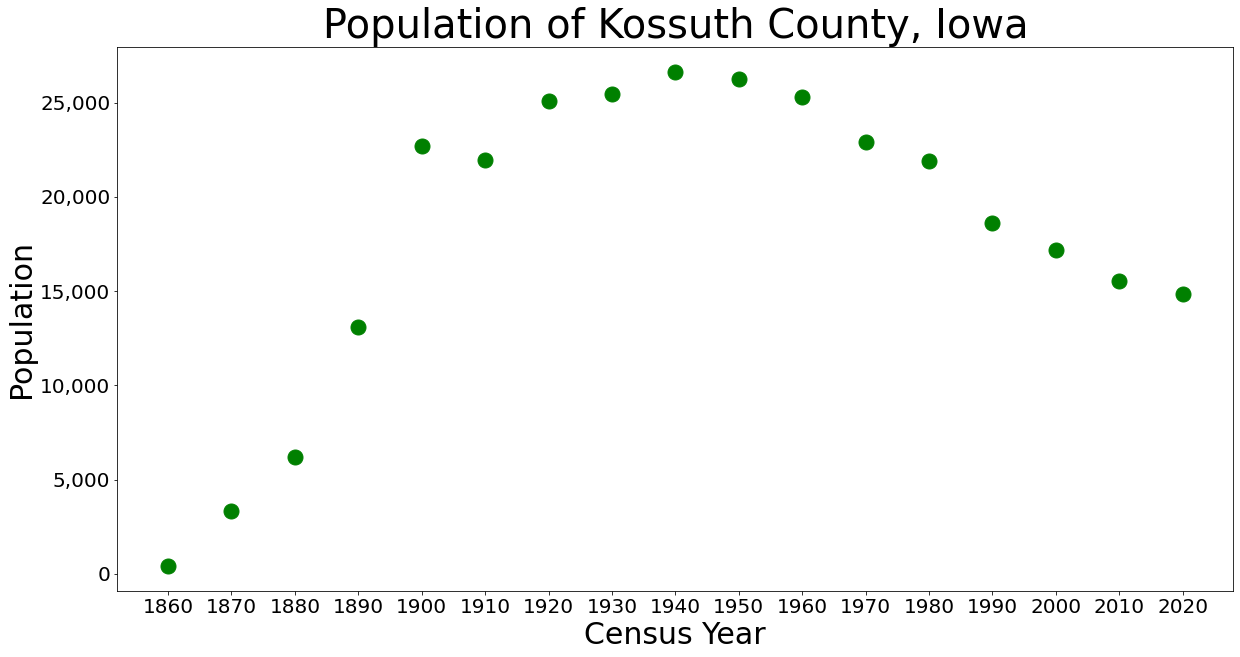
Population of Kossuth County from the U.S. census data

As of the 2020 census, the county had a population of 14,828, a population density of 15.2/sq mi (5.9/km^{2}), and 96.53% of the population reported being of one race. The median age was 46.3 years, 21.4% of residents were under the age of 18, and 24.5% were 65 years of age or older; for every 100 females there were 102.7 males and for every 100 females age 18 and over there were 100.4 males age 18 and over.

The racial makeup of the county was 93.8% White, 0.5% Black or African American, 0.1% American Indian and Alaska Native, 0.5% Asian, <0.1% Native Hawaiian and Pacific Islander, 1.5% from some other race, and 3.5% from two or more races. Hispanic or Latino residents of any race comprised 4.1% of the population.

36.7% of residents lived in urban areas, while 63.3% lived in rural areas.

There were 6,438 households in the county, of which 24.0% had children under the age of 18 living in them. Of all households, 52.3% were married-couple households, 20.3% were households with a male householder and no spouse or partner present, and 21.7% were households with a female householder and no spouse or partner present. About 32.6% of all households were made up of individuals and 15.9% had someone living alone who was 65 years of age or older.

Of the 7,216 housing units, 6,438 were occupied, leaving 10.8% vacant. Among occupied housing units, 77.8% were owner-occupied and 22.2% were renter-occupied. The homeowner vacancy rate was 2.2% and the rental vacancy rate was 14.3%.

=== 2010 census ===
As of the 2010 census recorded a population of 15,543 in the county, with a population density of 16.0/sq mi (6.2/km^{2}). There were 7,486 housing units, of which 6,697 were occupied.

=== 2000 census ===
As of the 2000 census there were 17,163 people, 6,974 households, and 4,791 families in the county. The population density was 18 people per square mile (6.9 people/km^{2}). There were 7,605 housing units at an average density of 8 units per square mile (3.1 units/km^{2}). The racial makeup of the county was 98.76% White, 0.11% Black or African American, 0.15% Native American, 0.35% Asian, 0.01% Pacific Islander, 0.29% from other races, and 0.34% from two or more races. 0.81%. were Hispanic or Latino of any race.

Of the 6,974 households, 30.90% had children under the age of 18 living with them, 60.40% were married couples living together, 5.80% had a female householder with no husband present, and 31.30% were non-families. 28.70% of households were one person and 15.50% were one person aged 65 or older. The average household size was 2.42 and the average family size was 2.98.

The age distribution was 25.80% under the age of 18, 6.10% from 18 to 24, 24.30% from 25 to 44, 23.60% from 45 to 64, and 20.10% 65 or older. The median age was 41 years. For every 100 females, there were 95.30 males. For every 100 females age 18 and over, there were 94.00 males.

The median household income was $34,562 and the median family income was $41,159. Males had a median income of $30,191 versus $20,184 for females. The per capita income for the county was $16,598. About 7.50% of families and 10.20% of the population were below the poverty line, including 12.40% of those under age 18 and 8.60% of those age 65 or over.

=== Census-designated places ===
For use by the United States Census Bureau in population analysis, some of the rural population of Kossuth County has been grouped together as a Census-designated place.

- Irvington
- Sexton
- St. Benedict
- St. Joseph

=== Population ranking ===
The population ranking of the following table is based on the 2020 census of Kossuth County.

† county seat

| Rank | City/Town/etc. | Municipal type | Population (2020 Census) |
|---|---|---|---|
| 1 | † Algona | City | 5,487 |
| 2 | Bancroft | City | 699 |
| 3 | Swea City | City | 566 |
| 4 | Titonka | City | 511 |
| 5 | Whittemore | City | 497 |
| 6 | Burt | City | 418 |
| 7 | Wesley | City | 391 |
| 8 | Fenton | City | 271 |
| 9 | Lakota | City | 267 |
| 10 | Lu Verne (partially in Humboldt County) | City | 228 (258 total) |
| 11 | Lone Rock | City | 146 |
| 12 | Ledyard | City | 121 |
| 13 | St. Joseph | CDP | 51 |
| 14 | Sexton | CDP | 46 |
| 15 | Irvington | CDP | 36 |
| 16 | St. Benedict | CDP | 31 |
| 17 | West Bend (mostly in Palo Alto County) | City | 19 (791 total) |

== Communities ==
=== Cities ===
- Algona (County seat)
- Bancroft
- Burt
- Fenton
- Lakota
- Ledyard
- Lone Rock
- Lu Verne
- Swea City
- Titonka
- Wesley
- West Bend
- Whittemore

=== Villages and Hamlets ===
- Galbraith
- Gerled
- German Valley
- Hanna
- Hobarton
- Lotts Creek
- Seneca
- Stevens

=== Townships ===
- Buffalo
- Burt
- Cresco
- Eagle
- Fenton
- Garfield
- German
- Grant
- Greenwood
- Harrison
- Hebron
- Irvington
- Ledyard
- Lincoln
- Lotts Creek
- Lu Verne
- Plum Creek
- Portland
- Prairie
- Ramsey
- Riverdale
- Seneca
- Sherman
- Springfield
- Swea
- Union
- Wesley
- Whittemore

== Politics ==
United States presidential election results for Kossuth County, Iowa
| Year | Republican | | Democratic | | Third party(ies) | |
| Year | No. | % | No. | % | No. | % |
|---|---|---|---|---|---|---|
| 1896 | 2,930 | 60.30% | 1,861 | 38.30% | 68 | 1.40% |
| 1900 | 3,122 | 63.06% | 1,777 | 35.89% | 52 | 1.05% |
| 1904 | 3,001 | 68.02% | 1,352 | 30.64% | 59 | 1.34% |
| 1908 | 2,612 | 58.28% | 1,826 | 40.74% | 44 | 0.98% |
| 1912 | 857 | 18.69% | 1,813 | 39.53% | 1,916 | 41.78% |
| 1916 | 2,647 | 59.63% | 1,748 | 39.38% | 44 | 0.99% |
| 1920 | 6,018 | 77.46% | 1,682 | 21.65% | 69 | 0.89% |
| 1924 | 3,806 | 43.51% | 1,369 | 15.65% | 3,572 | 40.84% |
| 1928 | 4,878 | 50.36% | 4,736 | 48.90% | 72 | 0.74% |
| 1932 | 3,075 | 30.30% | 6,925 | 68.24% | 148 | 1.46% |
| 1936 | 3,569 | 30.09% | 8,071 | 68.04% | 223 | 1.88% |
| 1940 | 5,639 | 46.35% | 6,502 | 53.45% | 24 | 0.20% |
| 1944 | 4,918 | 47.14% | 5,488 | 52.60% | 27 | 0.26% |
| 1948 | 4,186 | 40.43% | 6,039 | 58.33% | 128 | 1.24% |
| 1952 | 7,765 | 64.15% | 4,330 | 35.77% | 10 | 0.08% |
| 1956 | 6,680 | 54.74% | 5,514 | 45.18% | 10 | 0.08% |
| 1960 | 6,278 | 51.95% | 5,806 | 48.05% | 0 | 0.00% |
| 1964 | 3,776 | 35.38% | 6,893 | 64.58% | 5 | 0.05% |
| 1968 | 5,350 | 53.03% | 4,392 | 43.53% | 347 | 3.44% |
| 1972 | 5,841 | 56.39% | 4,393 | 42.41% | 124 | 1.20% |
| 1976 | 4,653 | 46.32% | 5,190 | 51.66% | 203 | 2.02% |
| 1980 | 5,568 | 54.26% | 3,810 | 37.13% | 884 | 8.61% |
| 1984 | 4,872 | 49.64% | 4,838 | 49.30% | 104 | 1.06% |
| 1988 | 3,938 | 43.24% | 5,088 | 55.87% | 81 | 0.89% |
| 1992 | 3,464 | 38.24% | 3,660 | 40.40% | 1,935 | 21.36% |
| 1996 | 3,477 | 40.88% | 4,031 | 47.40% | 997 | 11.72% |
| 2000 | 4,612 | 51.95% | 3,960 | 44.60% | 306 | 3.45% |
| 2004 | 5,042 | 54.46% | 4,132 | 44.63% | 84 | 0.91% |
| 2008 | 4,329 | 47.57% | 4,625 | 50.82% | 146 | 1.60% |
| 2012 | 4,937 | 55.33% | 3,850 | 43.15% | 136 | 1.52% |
| 2016 | 5,653 | 65.68% | 2,543 | 29.55% | 411 | 4.78% |
| 2020 | 6,275 | 69.03% | 2,696 | 29.66% | 119 | 1.31% |
| 2024 | 5,983 | 71.25% | 2,284 | 27.20% | 130 | 1.55% |

== Education ==
School districts include:

- Algona Community School District
- North Iowa Community School District
- North Kossuth Community School District
- North Union Community School District - Formed on July 1, 2014
- Twin Rivers Community School District
- West Bend-Mallard Community School District

Former school districts:

- Corwith-Wesley Community School District, dissolved on July 1, 2015.
- Lu Verne Community School District, consolidated into Algona CSD on July 1, 2023.
- Sentral Community School District, consolidated into North Union CSD on July 1, 2014.
- Titonka Consolidated School District, consolidated into Algona CSD on July 1, 2014.

== See also ==
- National Register of Historic Places listings in Kossuth County, Iowa
