= Sherman Township, Kossuth County, Iowa =

Township in Kossuth County, Iowa, U.S.

Coordinates: 42.9517°N 94.1486°W

Sherman Township is a township in Kossuth County, Iowa, United States.

== History ==
Sherman Township was organized in 1883.
