= List of counties in Iowa =

Counties of Iowa
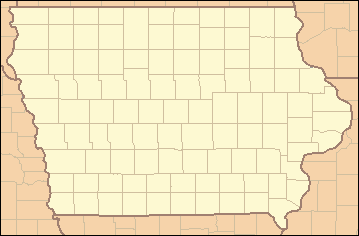
- Location: State of Iowa
- Number: 99
- Populations: 3,617 (Adams) – 516,546 (Polk)
- Areas: 381 square miles (990 km^{2}) (Dickinson) – 973 square miles (2,520 km^{2}) (Kossuth)
- Government: County government
- Subdivisions: Cities, towns, townships, unincorporated communities, census-designated places

There are 99 counties in the U.S. state of Iowa. The first two counties, Des Moines County and Dubuque County, were created in 1834 when Iowa was still part of the Michigan Territory. In preparation for Michigan's statehood, part of Michigan Territory was formed into Wisconsin Territory in 1836. Two years later, the western portion was split off to become Iowa Territory. The south-eastern part of Iowa Territory became Iowa, the 29th state in the union, on December 28, 1846, by which point 44 counties had been created. Counties continued to be created by the state government until 1857, when the last county, Humboldt County, was created. One of the most significant days in Iowa county history was January 15, 1851, on which 49 counties were created.

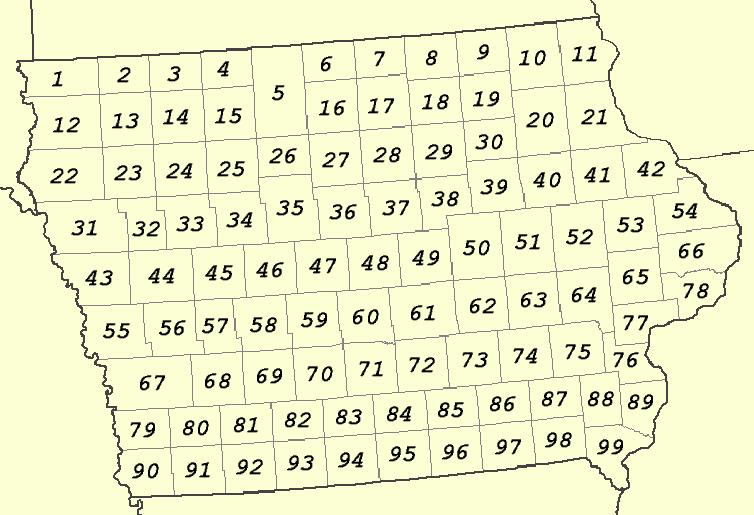
Map of counties numbered as in the National Atlas of the United States

The Iowa Constitution of 1857, which is still in effect today, states that counties must have an area of at least 432 square miles (1,120 km^{2}), and no county may be reduced below that size by boundary changes. However, exceptions to this rule were granted, as ten counties have areas below this size. (The table below shows land area, but the Constitution deals with total area.) The smallest county (Dickinson) has a land area of 381 sq mi (990 km^{2}), while the largest (Kossuth) has an area 973 sq mi (2,520 km^{2}). Polk County is the most densely populated county at 864/sq mi (333.5/km^{2}), an increase in density from 2010 when it was 655.5/sq mi (253.08/km^{2}). Polk County contains the state's capital and largest city, Des Moines. In addition, Iowa has one of the smallest percentages of counties whose boundaries are dictated by natural means, the vast majority of which are being formed by lines of survey instead, resulting in many "box counties".

== County information ==
The Federal Information Processing Standard (FIPS) code, used by the United States government to uniquely identify counties, is provided with each entry. The FIPS code for each county links to census data for that county. The column labeled '#' is the official county number when listed alphabetically. This number is used for many governmental and organizational purposes, including state income tax preparation. From 1922 to 1978, it was also used on Iowa license plates until it was replaced by the full county name. Finally, the number in the column headed "Map #" is used by the National Atlas of the United States, shown on the left; for purposes of the National Atlas, counties are numbered in geographical order beginning in the NW corner of the map.

| County | FIPS code | County seat | # | Est. | Formed from | Etymology | Map # | Population | Area | Map |
|---|---|---|---|---|---|---|---|---|---|---|
| Adair County | 001 | Greenfield | 01 | Jan 15, 1851 | Cass County | John Adair, Kentucky Governor | 69 | 7,403 | 569 sq mi (1,474 km^{2}) | State map highlighting Adair County |
| Adams County | 003 | Corning | 02 | Jan 15, 1851 | Taylor County | John Adams, US President | 81 | 3,617 | 424 sq mi (1,098 km^{2}) | State map highlighting Adams County |
| Allamakee County | 005 | Waukon | 03 | Feb 20, 1847 | Clayton County | Disputed, possibly Allan Makee, early trader and guide for settlers, or Meskwaki anamiki and/or Ojibwe animikii both meaning thunder or thunderer | 11 | 14,238 | 640 sq mi (1,658 km^{2}) | State map highlighting Allamakee County |
| Appanoose County | 007 | Centerville | 04 | Feb 17, 1843 | Davis County | Chief Appanoose, headed peace party in the Black Hawk War | 96 | 12,077 | 496 sq mi (1,285 km^{2}) | State map highlighting Appanoose County |
| Audubon County | 009 | Audubon | 05 | Jan 15, 1851 | Black Hawk County and Cass County | John James Audubon, ornithologist and artist | 57 | 5,509 | 443 sq mi (1,147 km^{2}) | State map highlighting Audubon County |
| Benton County | 011 | Vinton | 06 | Dec 21, 1837 | Native American lands and Wisconsin Territory | Thomas Hart Benton, Missouri Senator | 51 | 26,004 | 716 sq mi (1,854 km^{2}) | State map highlighting Benton County |
| Black Hawk County | 013 | Waterloo | 07 | Feb 17, 1843 | Delaware County | Black Hawk, leader during Black Hawk War | 39 | 131,532 | 567 sq mi (1,469 km^{2}) | State map highlighting Black Hawk County |
| Boone County | 015 | Boone | 08 | Jan 13, 1846 | Polk County | Nathan Boone, one of the first to survey Iowa | 47 | 26,799 | 572 sq mi (1,481 km^{2}) | State map highlighting Boone County |
| Bremer County | 017 | Waverly | 09 | Jan 15, 1851 | Native American lands and Winnebago County | Fredrika Bremer, Swedish poet and author | 30 | 25,296 | 428 sq mi (1,109 km^{2}) | State map highlighting Bremer County |
| Buchanan County | 019 | Independence | 10 | Dec 21, 1837 | Delaware County and Wisconsin Territory | James Buchanan, US President | 40 | 20,883 | 571 sq mi (1,479 km^{2}) | State map highlighting Buchanan County |
| Buena Vista County | 021 | Storm Lake | 11 | Jan 15, 1851 | Clay County and Sac County | Battle of Buena Vista, Mexican–American War | 24 | 20,449 | 575 sq mi (1,489 km^{2}) | State map highlighting Buena Vista County |
| Butler County | 023 | Allison | 12 | Jan 15, 1851 | Black Hawk County and Buchanan County | William Orlando Butler, War of 1812 hero | 29 | 14,049 | 580 sq mi (1,502 km^{2}) | State map highlighting Butler County |
| Calhoun County | 025 | Rockwell City | 13 | Jan 15, 1851 | Fox County (renamed) | John C. Calhoun, US Vice President | 34 | 9,562 | 570 sq mi (1,476 km^{2}) | State map highlighting Calhoun County |
| Carroll County | 027 | Carroll | 14 | Jan 15, 1851 | Guthrie County | Charles Carroll, signatory of the Declaration of Independence | 45 | 20,303 | 569 sq mi (1,474 km^{2}) | State map highlighting Carroll County |
| Cass County | 029 | Atlantic | 15 | Jan 15, 1851 | Pottawattamie County | Lewis Cass, Michigan Senator | 68 | 12,960 | 564 sq mi (1,461 km^{2}) | State map highlighting Cass County |
| Cedar County | 031 | Tipton | 16 | Dec 21, 1837 | Wisconsin Territory | Cedar River that runs through county | 65 | 18,359 | 580 sq mi (1,502 km^{2}) | State map highlighting Cedar County |
| Cerro Gordo County | 033 | Mason City | 17 | Jan 15, 1851 | Floyd County | Battle of Cerro Gordo, Mexican–American War | 17 | 42,372 | 568 sq mi (1,471 km^{2}) | State map highlighting Cerro Gordo County |
| Cherokee County | 035 | Cherokee | 18 | Jan 15, 1851 | Crawford County | Cherokee People | 23 | 11,369 | 577 sq mi (1,494 km^{2}) | State map highlighting Cherokee County |
| Chickasaw County | 037 | New Hampton | 19 | Jan 15, 1851 | Fayette County | Chickasaw People | 19 | 11,663 | 505 sq mi (1,308 km^{2}) | State map highlighting Chickasaw County |
| Clarke County | 039 | Osceola | 20 | Jan 13, 1846 | Lucas County | James Clarke, Governor of Iowa Territory | 83 | 9,574 | 431 sq mi (1,116 km^{2}) | State map highlighting Clarke County |
| Clay County | 041 | Spencer | 21 | Jan 15, 1851 | Native American lands | Henry Clay, Jr., officer in the Mexican–American War | 14 | 16,202 | 569 sq mi (1,474 km^{2}) | State map highlighting Clay County |
| Clayton County | 043 | Elkader | 22 | Dec 21, 1837 | Dubuque County and Wisconsin Territory | John M. Clayton, Delaware Senator | 21 | 16,845 | 779 sq mi (2,018 km^{2}) | State map highlighting Clayton County |
| Clinton County | 045 | Clinton | 23 | Dec 21, 1837 | Dubuque County and Wisconsin Territory | DeWitt Clinton, New York Governor | 66 | 46,002 | 695 sq mi (1,800 km^{2}) | State map highlighting Clinton County |
| Crawford County | 047 | Denison | 24 | Jan 15, 1851 | Shelby County | William Harris Crawford, Georgia Senator | 44 | 16,237 | 714 sq mi (1,849 km^{2}) | State map highlighting Crawford County |
| Dallas County | 049 | Adel | 25 | Jan 13, 1846 | Polk County | George Mifflin Dallas, US Vice President | 59 | 118,457 | 586 sq mi (1,518 km^{2}) | State map highlighting Dallas County |
| Davis County | 051 | Bloomfield | 26 | Feb 17, 1843 | Van Buren County | Garrett Davis, Kentucky Congressman | 97 | 9,230 | 503 sq mi (1,303 km^{2}) | State map highlighting Davis County |
| Decatur County | 053 | Leon | 27 | Jan 13, 1846 | Appanoose County | Stephen Decatur, War of 1812 naval officer | 94 | 7,655 | 532 sq mi (1,378 km^{2}) | State map highlighting Decatur County |
| Delaware County | 055 | Manchester | 28 | Dec 21, 1837 | Dubuque County and Wisconsin Territory | State of Delaware, home of Iowa statehood advocate US Senator John M. Clayton | 41 | 17,674 | 578 sq mi (1,497 km^{2}) | State map highlighting Delaware County |
| Des Moines County | 057 | Burlington | 29 | Oct 1, 1834 | Michigan Territory and Wisconsin Territory | Des Moines River that once ran through the county | 89 | 38,077 | 416 sq mi (1,077 km^{2}) | State map highlighting Des Moines County |
| Dickinson County | 059 | Spirit Lake | 30 | Jan 15, 1851 | Kossuth County | Daniel Stevens Dickinson, New York Senator | 3 | 18,077 | 381 sq mi (987 km^{2}) | State map highlighting Dickinson County |
| Dubuque County | 061 | Dubuque | 31 | Oct 1, 1834 | Michigan Territory and Wisconsin Territory | Julien Dubuque, first permanent white settler in Iowa | 42 | 99,381 | 608 sq mi (1,575 km^{2}) | State map highlighting Dubuque County |
| Emmet County | 063 | Estherville | 32 | Jan 15, 1851 | Dickinson County and Kossuth County | Robert Emmet, Irish revolutionary and American republican sympathizer | 4 | 9,107 | 396 sq mi (1,026 km^{2}) | State map highlighting Emmet County |
| Fayette County | 065 | West Union | 33 | Dec 21, 1837 | Clayton County and Wisconsin Territory | Marquis de Lafayette, Frenchman who aided colonial forces during American Revolutionary War | 20 | 19,047 | 731 sq mi (1,893 km^{2}) | State map highlighting Fayette County |
| Floyd County | 067 | Charles City | 34 | Jan 15, 1851 | Chickasaw County | Charles Floyd, member of Lewis and Clark Expedition who died in Iowa | 18 | 14,901 | 501 sq mi (1,298 km^{2}) | State map highlighting Floyd County |
| Franklin County | 069 | Hampton | 35 | Jan 15, 1851 | Chickasaw County | Benjamin Franklin, statesman and US founding father | 28 | 9,868 | 582 sq mi (1,507 km^{2}) | State map highlighting Franklin County |
| Fremont County | 071 | Sidney | 36 | Feb 24, 1847 | Pottawattamie County | John Charles Fremont, Mexican–American War officer | 90 | 6,522 | 511 sq mi (1,323 km^{2}) | State map highlighting Fremont County |
| Greene County | 073 | Jefferson | 37 | Jan 15, 1851 | Dallas County | Nathanael Greene, American Revolutionary War general | 46 | 8,658 | 568 sq mi (1,471 km^{2}) | State map highlighting Greene County |
| Grundy County | 075 | Grundy Center | 38 | Jan 15, 1851 | Black Hawk County | Felix Grundy, Tennessee Congressman | 38 | 12,361 | 503 sq mi (1,303 km^{2}) | State map highlighting Grundy County |
| Guthrie County | 077 | Guthrie Center | 39 | Jan 15, 1851 | Jackson County | Edwin B. Guthrie, Mexican–American War officer | 58 | 10,782 | 591 sq mi (1,531 km^{2}) | State map highlighting Guthrie County |
| Hamilton County | 079 | Webster City | 40 | Jan 8, 1857 | Webster County | William W. Hamilton, President of Iowa Senate (1856–1857) | 36 | 14,944 | 577 sq mi (1,494 km^{2}) | State map highlighting Hamilton County |
| Hancock County | 081 | Garner | 41 | Jan 15, 1851 | Wright County | John Hancock, President of First Continental Congress | 16 | 10,528 | 571 sq mi (1,479 km^{2}) | State map highlighting Hancock County |
| Hardin County | 083 | Eldora | 42 | Jan 15, 1851 | Black Hawk County | John J. Hardin, prominent soldier, Black Hawk War | 37 | 16,455 | 569 sq mi (1,474 km^{2}) | State map highlighting Hardin County |
| Harrison County | 085 | Logan | 43 | Jan 15, 1851 | Pottawattamie County | William Henry Harrison, US President | 55 | 14,623 | 697 sq mi (1,805 km^{2}) | State map highlighting Harrison County |
| Henry County | 087 | Mount Pleasant | 44 | Dec 7, 1836 | Wisconsin Territory | Disputed, see reference | 88 | 19,349 | 434 sq mi (1,124 km^{2}) | State map highlighting Henry County |
| Howard County | 089 | Cresco | 45 | Jan 15, 1851 | Chickasaw County | Tilghman Howard, US Representative from Indiana | 9 | 9,415 | 473 sq mi (1,225 km^{2}) | State map highlighting Howard County |
| Humboldt County | 091 | Dakota City | 46 | Jan 15, 1851 | Webster County | Alexander von Humboldt, German scientist | 26 | 9,409 | 434 sq mi (1,124 km^{2}) | State map highlighting Humboldt County |
| Ida County | 093 | Ida Grove | 47 | Jan 15, 1851 | Cherokee County | Either Mount Ida in Greece or Ida Smith, child of early settlers | 32 | 6,777 | 432 sq mi (1,119 km^{2}) | State map highlighting Ida County |
| Iowa County | 095 | Marengo | 48 | Feb 17, 1843 | Washington County | Iowa River that flows through the county | 63 | 16,504 | 586 sq mi (1,518 km^{2}) | State map highlighting Iowa County |
| Jackson County | 097 | Maquoketa | 49 | Dec 21, 1837 | Wisconsin Territory | Andrew Jackson, US President | 54 | 19,288 | 636 sq mi (1,647 km^{2}) | State map highlighting Jackson County |
| Jasper County | 099 | Newton | 50 | Jan 13, 1846 | Mahaska County | William Jasper, American Revolutionary War sergeant | 61 | 38,153 | 730 sq mi (1,891 km^{2}) | State map highlighting Jasper County |
| Jefferson County | 101 | Fairfield | 51 | Jan 21, 1839 | Native American lands | Thomas Jefferson, US President | 87 | 15,291 | 435 sq mi (1,127 km^{2}) | State map highlighting Jefferson County |
| Johnson County | 103 | Iowa City | 52 | Dec 21, 1837 | Des Moines County, Iowa and Wisconsin Territory | Richard Mentor Johnson (before 2020); Lulu Johnson (since 2020) | 64 | 160,044 | 614 sq mi (1,590 km^{2}) | State map highlighting Johnson County |
| Jones County | 105 | Anamosa | 53 | Dec 21, 1837 | Wisconsin Territory | George Wallace Jones, Iowa Senator | 53 | 21,253 | 575 sq mi (1,489 km^{2}) | State map highlighting Jones County |
| Keokuk County | 107 | Sigourney | 54 | Dec 21, 1837 | Washington County | Chief Keokuk | 74 | 9,797 | 579 sq mi (1,500 km^{2}) | State map highlighting Keokuk County |
| Kossuth County | 109 | Algona | 55 | Jan 15, 1851 | Webster County | Lajos Kossuth, Hungarian revolutionary inspired by American democratic ideals | 5 | 14,322 | 973 sq mi (2,520 km^{2}) | State map highlighting Kossuth County |
| Lee County | 111 | Fort Madison and Keokuk | 56 | Dec 7, 1836 | Des Moines County | William Elliott Lee, businessman from the New York Land Company, who sold the county's first tracts of land | 99 | 32,306 | 517 sq mi (1,339 km^{2}) | State map highlighting Lee County |
| Linn County | 113 | Cedar Rapids | 57 | Dec 21, 1837 | Wisconsin Territory | Lewis Fields Linn, doctor and Missouri Senator | 52 | 232,028 | 718 sq mi (1,860 km^{2}) | State map highlighting Linn County |
| Louisa County | 115 | Wapello | 58 | Dec 7, 1836 | Des Moines County | Disputed, see reference | 76 | 10,416 | 402 sq mi (1,041 km^{2}) | State map highlighting Louisa County |
| Lucas County | 117 | Chariton | 59 | Jan 13, 1846 | Monroe County | Robert Lucas, first Governor of Iowa Territory | 84 | 8,847 | 431 sq mi (1,116 km^{2}) | State map highlighting Lucas County |
| Lyon County | 119 | Rock Rapids | 60 | Jan 15, 1851 | Woodbury County, Iowa | Nathaniel Lyon, first Union general to be killed in the American Civil War, (Formerly named Buncombe County) | 1 | 12,354 | 588 sq mi (1,523 km^{2}) | State map highlighting Lyon County |
| Madison County | 121 | Winterset | 61 | Jan 13, 1846 | Polk County | James Madison, US President | 70 | 17,270 | 561 sq mi (1,453 km^{2}) | State map highlighting Madison County |
| Mahaska County | 123 | Oskaloosa | 62 | Feb 17, 1843 | Meskwaki and Sauk Indian lands | Chief Mahaska | 73 | 21,880 | 571 sq mi (1,479 km^{2}) | State map highlighting Mahaska County |
| Marion County | 125 | Knoxville | 63 | Aug 4, 1845 | Washington County | Francis Marion, American Revolutionary War general | 72 | 34,192 | 554 sq mi (1,435 km^{2}) | State map highlighting Marion County |
| Marshall County | 127 | Marshalltown | 64 | Jan 13, 1846 | Jasper County | John Marshall, Chief Justice of the United States Supreme Court | 49 | 39,890 | 572 sq mi (1,481 km^{2}) | State map highlighting Marshall County |
| Mills County | 129 | Glenwood | 65 | Jan 15, 1851 | Pottawattamie County | Frederick Mills, major killed during the Battle of Churubusco, Mexican–American War | 79 | 14,793 | 437 sq mi (1,132 km^{2}) | State map highlighting Mills County |
| Mitchell County | 131 | Osage | 66 | Jan 15, 1851 | Chickasaw County | John Mitchel, Irish revolutionary who operated out of the US | 8 | 10,650 | 469 sq mi (1,215 km^{2}) | State map highlighting Mitchell County |
| Monona County | 133 | Onawa | 67 | Jan 15, 1851 | Harrison County | Probably from the name of a fictional Native American character in a play | 43 | 8,539 | 693 sq mi (1,795 km^{2}) | State map highlighting Monona County |
| Monroe County | 135 | Albia | 68 | Feb 17, 1843 | Wapello County | James Monroe, US President (Formerly named Kishkekosh County) | 85 | 7,406 | 433 sq mi (1,121 km^{2}) | State map highlighting Monroe County |
| Montgomery County | 137 | Red Oak | 69 | Jan 15, 1851 | Polk County | Richard Montgomery, American Revolutionary War general | 80 | 10,002 | 424 sq mi (1,098 km^{2}) | State map highlighting Montgomery County |
| Muscatine County | 139 | Muscatine | 70 | Dec 7, 1836 | Des Moines County | debated, possibly Mascouten People | 77 | 41,853 | 439 sq mi (1,137 km^{2}) | State map highlighting Muscatine County |
| O'Brien County | 141 | Primghar | 71 | Jan 15, 1851 | Cherokee County | William Smith O'Brien, Irish revolutionary inspired by American democratic ideals | 13 | 14,220 | 573 sq mi (1,484 km^{2}) | State map highlighting O'Brien County |
| Osceola County | 143 | Sibley | 72 | Jan 15, 1851 | Woodbury County | Osceola, Seminole leader | 2 | 5,980 | 399 sq mi (1,033 km^{2}) | State map highlighting Osceola County |
| Page County | 145 | Clarinda | 73 | Feb 24, 1847 | Pottawattamie County | John Page, officer killed in Battle of Palo Alto, Mexican–American War | 91 | 14,856 | 535 sq mi (1,386 km^{2}) | State map highlighting Page County |
| Palo Alto County | 147 | Emmetsburg | 74 | Jan 15, 1851 | Kossuth County | Battle of Palo Alto, Mexican–American War | 15 | 8,899 | 564 sq mi (1,461 km^{2}) | State map highlighting Palo Alto County |
| Plymouth County | 149 | Le Mars | 75 | Jan 15, 1851 | Woodbury County | Plymouth, Massachusetts | 22 | 25,697 | 864 sq mi (2,238 km^{2}) | State map highlighting Plymouth County |
| Pocahontas County | 151 | Pocahontas | 76 | Jan 15, 1851 | Greene County and Humboldt County | Pocahontas, famous Native American woman | 25 | 6,819 | 578 sq mi (1,497 km^{2}) | State map highlighting Pocahontas County |
| Polk County | 153 | Des Moines | 77 | Jan 13, 1846 | Native American lands | James K. Polk, US President | 60 | 516,546 | 570 sq mi (1,476 km^{2}) | State map highlighting Polk County |
| Pottawattamie County | 155 | Council Bluffs | 78 | Feb 24, 1847 | Native American lands | Potawatomi People | 67 | 92,996 | 954 sq mi (2,471 km^{2}) | State map highlighting Pottawattamie County |
| Poweshiek County | 157 | Montezuma | 79 | Feb 17, 1843 | Meskwaki lands | Chief Poweshiek, Meskwaki | 62 | 18,368 | 585 sq mi (1,515 km^{2}) | State map highlighting Poweshiek County |
| Ringgold County | 159 | Mount Ayr | 80 | Feb 24, 1847 | Taylor County | Samuel Ringgold, major killed in the Mexican–American War | 93 | 4,642 | 538 sq mi (1,393 km^{2}) | State map highlighting Ringgold County |
| Sac County | 161 | Sac City | 81 | Jan 15, 1851 | Greene County | Sauk (Sac) People | 33 | 9,525 | 576 sq mi (1,492 km^{2}) | State map highlighting Sac County |
| Scott County | 163 | Davenport | 82 | Dec 21, 1837 | Wisconsin Territory | Winfield Scott, War of 1812 General | 78 | 175,259 | 458 sq mi (1,186 km^{2}) | State map highlighting Scott County |
| Shelby County | 165 | Harlan | 83 | Jan 15, 1851 | Cass County | Isaac Shelby, American Revolutionary War General, War of 1812 | 56 | 11,689 | 591 sq mi (1,531 km^{2}) | State map highlighting Shelby County |
| Sioux County | 167 | Orange City | 84 | Jan 15, 1851 | Plymouth County | Sioux People | 12 | 36,774 | 768 sq mi (1,989 km^{2}) | State map highlighting Sioux County |
| Story County | 169 | Nevada | 85 | Jan 13, 1846 | Boone County, Jasper County, and Polk County | Joseph Story, US Supreme Court Justice | 48 | 101,291 | 573 sq mi (1,484 km^{2}) | State map highlighting Story County |
| Tama County | 171 | Toledo | 86 | Feb 17, 1843 | Benton County and Boone County | Disputed, see reference | 50 | 16,796 | 721 sq mi (1,867 km^{2}) | State map highlighting Tama County |
| Taylor County | 173 | Bedford | 87 | Feb 24, 1847 | Page County | Zachary Taylor, US President | 92 | 5,835 | 534 sq mi (1,383 km^{2}) | State map highlighting Taylor County |
| Union County | 175 | Creston | 88 | Jan 15, 1851 | Clarke County | The union of the states | 82 | 11,829 | 424 sq mi (1,098 km^{2}) | State map highlighting Union County |
| Van Buren County | 177 | Keosauqua | 89 | Dec 7, 1836 | Des Moines County | Martin Van Buren, US President | 98 | 7,131 | 485 sq mi (1,256 km^{2}) | State map highlighting Van Buren County |
| Wapello County | 179 | Ottumwa | 90 | Feb 17, 1843 | Native American lands | Chief Wapello | 86 | 35,210 | 432 sq mi (1,119 km^{2}) | State map highlighting Wapello County |
| Warren County | 181 | Indianola | 91 | Jan 13, 1846 | Polk County | Joseph Warren, American Revolutionary War General | 71 | 57,331 | 572 sq mi (1,481 km^{2}) | State map highlighting Warren County |
| Washington County | 183 | Washington | 92 | Jan 18, 1838 | Wisconsin Territory | George Washington, US President (Formerly named Slaughter County) | 75 | 22,667 | 569 sq mi (1,474 km^{2}) | State map highlighting Washington County |
| Wayne County | 185 | Corydon | 93 | Jan 13, 1846 | Appanoose County | Anthony Wayne, American Revolutionary War General | 95 | 6,738 | 526 sq mi (1,362 km^{2}) | State map highlighting Wayne County |
| Webster County | 187 | Fort Dodge | 94 | Jan 22, 1853 | Risley County and Yell County (defunct IA counties) | Daniel Webster, Massachusetts Senator | 35 | 36,838 | 715 sq mi (1,852 km^{2}) | State map highlighting Webster County |
| Winnebago County | 189 | Forest City | 95 | Jan 15, 1851 | Kossuth County | Winnebago (Ho–Chunk) People | 6 | 10,251 | 400 sq mi (1,036 km^{2}) | State map highlighting Winnebago County |
| Winneshiek County | 191 | Decorah | 96 | Feb 20, 1847 | Native American lands | Chief Winneshiek | 10 | 19,733 | 690 sq mi (1,787 km^{2}) | State map highlighting Winneshiek County |
| Woodbury County | 193 | Sioux City | 97 | Jan 15, 1851 | Wahkaw County (renamed), Polk County | Levi Woodbury, New Hampshire Governor | 31 | 106,649 | 873 sq mi (2,261 km^{2}) | State map highlighting Woodbury County |
| Worth County | 195 | Northwood | 98 | Jan 15, 1851 | Mitchell County | William Jenkins Worth, Black Hawk War and Mexican–American War officer | 7 | 7,338 | 400 sq mi (1,036 km^{2}) | State map highlighting Worth County |
| Wright County | 197 | Clarion | 99 | Jan 15, 1851 | Webster County and Kossuth County | Silas Wright, New York Governor, and Joseph Albert Wright, Indiana Governor (brothers) | 27 | 12,801 | 581 sq mi (1,505 km^{2}) | State map highlighting Wright County |

== Racial / Ethnic Profile of counties in Iowa (2020 Census) ==
Racial / Ethnic Profile of counties in Iowa (2020 Census)
Following is a table of counties in Iowa by race/ethnicity. The majority racial/ethnic group is coded per the key below.

| Majority minority with no dominant group |
| Majority White |
| Majority Black |
| Majority Hispanic |
| Majority Asian |
| Majority Native American |

Racial and ethnic composition of counties in Iowa (2020 Census) (NH = Non-Hispanic) Note: the US Census treats Hispanic/Latino as an ethnic category. This table excludes Latinos from the racial categories and assigns them to a separate category. Hispanics/Latinos may be of any race.
| County | Location of County | Total Population | White alone (NH) | % | Black or African American alone (NH) | % | Native American or Alaska Native alone (NH) | % | Asian alone (NH) | % | Pacific Islander alone (NH) | % | Other race alone (NH) | % | Mixed race or Multiracial (NH) | % | Hispanic or Latino (any race) | % |
|---|---|---|---|---|---|---|---|---|---|---|---|---|---|---|---|---|---|---|
| Adair | | 7,496 | 7,066 | 94.26% | 45 | 0.60% | 16 | 0.21% | 23 | 0.31% | 1 | 0.01% | 4 | 0.05% | 155 | 2.07% | 186 | 2.48% |
| Adams | | 3,704 | 3,518 | 94.98% | 12 | 0.32% | 15 | 0.40% | 13 | 0.35% | 0 | 0.00% | 15 | 0.40% | 89 | 2.40% | 42 | 1.13% |
| Allamakee | | 14,061 | 12,401 | 88.19% | 146 | 1.04% | 14 | 0.10% | 41 | 0.29% | 5 | 0.04% | 24 | 0.17% | 209 | 1.49% | 1,221 | 8.68% |
| Appanoose | | 12,317 | 11,586 | 94.06% | 75 | 0.61% | 19 | 0.15% | 69 | 0.56% | 0 | 0.00% | 14 | 0.11% | 323 | 2.62% | 231 | 1.88% |
| Audubon | | 5,674 | 5,443 | 95.93% | 17 | 0.30% | 5 | 0.09% | 4 | 0.07% | 1 | 0.02% | 4 | 0.07% | 114 | 2.01% | 86 | 1.52% |
| Benton | | 25,575 | 24,077 | 94.14% | 112 | 0.44% | 29 | 0.11% | 79 | 0.31% | 2 | 0.01% | 57 | 0.22% | 757 | 2.96% | 462 | 1.81% |
| Black Hawk | | 131,144 | 101,150 | 77.13% | 13,529 | 10.32% | 219 | 0.17% | 3,412 | 2.60% | 848 | 0.65% | 377 | 0.29% | 5,161 | 3.94% | 6,448 | 4.92% |
| Boone | | 26,715 | 24,720 | 92.53% | 289 | 1.08% | 51 | 0.19% | 100 | 0.37% | 3 | 0.01% | 42 | 0.16% | 801 | 3.00% | 709 | 2.65% |
| Bremer | | 24,988 | 23,403 | 93.66% | 239 | 0.96% | 26 | 0.10% | 196 | 0.78% | 2 | 0.01% | 32 | 0.13% | 579 | 2.32% | 511 | 2.04% |
| Buchanan | | 20,565 | 19,565 | 95.14% | 70 | 0.34% | 18 | 0.09% | 52 | 0.25% | 11 | 0.05% | 17 | 0.08% | 494 | 2.40% | 338 | 1.64% |
| Buena Vista | | 20,823 | 11,377 | 54.64% | 560 | 2.69% | 29 | 0.14% | 1,889 | 9.07% | 614 | 2.95% | 77 | 0.37% | 352 | 1.69% | 5,925 | 28.45% |
| Butler | | 14,334 | 13,751 | 95.93% | 26 | 0.18% | 16 | 0.11% | 28 | 0.20% | 0 | 0.00% | 19 | 0.13% | 311 | 2.17% | 183 | 1.28% |
| Calhoun | | 9,927 | 9,261 | 93.29% | 151 | 1.52% | 22 | 0.22% | 24 | 0.24% | 8 | 0.08% | 19 | 0.19% | 206 | 2.08% | 236 | 2.38% |
| Carroll | | 20,760 | 19,409 | 93.49% | 262 | 1.26% | 19 | 0.09% | 75 | 0.36% | 0 | 0.00% | 18 | 0.09% | 383 | 1.84% | 594 | 2.86% |
| Cass | | 13,127 | 12,317 | 93.83% | 28 | 0.21% | 17 | 0.13% | 35 | 0.27% | 78 | 0.59% | 28 | 0.21% | 318 | 2.42% | 306 | 2.33% |
| Cedar | | 18,505 | 17,334 | 93.67% | 79 | 0.43% | 40 | 0.22% | 61 | 0.33% | 2 | 0.01% | 54 | 0.29% | 473 | 2.56% | 462 | 2.50% |
| Cerro Gordo | | 43,127 | 37,819 | 87.69% | 848 | 1.97% | 96 | 0.22% | 535 | 1.24% | 137 | 0.32% | 82 | 0.19% | 1,367 | 3.17% | 2,243 | 5.20% |
| Cherokee | | 11,658 | 10,668 | 91.51% | 84 | 0.72% | 24 | 0.21% | 57 | 0.49% | 14 | 0.12% | 28 | 0.24% | 253 | 2.17% | 530 | 4.55% |
| Chickasaw | | 12,012 | 11,173 | 93.02% | 75 | 0.62% | 7 | 0.06% | 28 | 0.23% | 0 | 0.00% | 7 | 0.06% | 241 | 2.01% | 481 | 4.00% |
| Clarke | | 9,748 | 7,837 | 80.40% | 43 | 0.44% | 7 | 0.07% | 81 | 0.83% | 40 | 0.41% | 28 | 0.29% | 178 | 1.83% | 1,534 | 15.74% |
| Clay | | 16,384 | 15,025 | 91.71% | 99 | 0.60% | 37 | 0.23% | 105 | 0.64% | 2 | 0.01% | 12 | 0.07% | 400 | 2.44% | 704 | 4.30% |
| Clayton | | 17,043 | 16,111 | 94.53% | 158 | 0.93% | 34 | 0.20% | 47 | 0.28% | 6 | 0.04% | 16 | 0.09% | 328 | 1.92% | 343 | 2.01% |
| Clinton | | 46,460 | 41,226 | 88.73% | 1,392 | 3.00% | 103 | 0.22% | 252 | 0.54% | 10 | 0.02% | 104 | 0.22% | 1,834 | 3.95% | 1,539 | 3.31% |
| Crawford | | 16,525 | 10,625 | 64.30% | 383 | 2.32% | 31 | 0.19% | 303 | 1.83% | 4 | 0.02% | 27 | 0.16% | 240 | 1.45% | 4,912 | 29.72% |
| Dallas | | 99,678 | 81,708 | 81.97% | 2,657 | 2.67% | 137 | 0.14% | 4,987 | 5.00% | 32 | 0.03% | 340 | 0.34% | 3,302 | 3.31% | 6,515 | 6.54% |
| Davis | | 9,110 | 8,735 | 95.88% | 8 | 0.09% | 11 | 0.12% | 15 | 0.16% | 0 | 0.00% | 10 | 0.11% | 187 | 2.05% | 144 | 1.58% |
| Decatur | | 7,645 | 7,010 | 91.69% | 97 | 1.27% | 17 | 0.22% | 39 | 0.51% | 21 | 0.27% | 26 | 0.34% | 224 | 2.93% | 211 | 2.76% |
| Delaware | | 17,488 | 16,706 | 95.53% | 122 | 0.70% | 24 | 0.14% | 39 | 0.22% | 0 | 0.00% | 30 | 0.17% | 323 | 1.85% | 244 | 1.40% |
| Des Moines | | 38,910 | 32,753 | 84.18% | 2,501 | 6.43% | 67 | 0.17% | 398 | 1.02% | 21 | 0.05% | 128 | 0.33% | 1,797 | 4.62% | 1,245 | 3.20% |
| Dickinson | | 17,703 | 16,709 | 94.39% | 76 | 0.43% | 14 | 0.08% | 80 | 0.45% | 1 | 0.01% | 25 | 0.14% | 392 | 2.21% | 406 | 2.29% |
| Dubuque | | 99,266 | 87,349 | 87.99% | 4,035 | 4.06% | 131 | 0.13% | 1,018 | 1.03% | 813 | 0.82% | 255 | 0.26% | 2,688 | 2.71% | 2,977 | 3.00% |
| Emmet | | 9,388 | 8,134 | 86.64% | 89 | 0.95% | 31 | 0.33% | 32 | 0.34% | 3 | 0.03% | 11 | 0.12% | 201 | 2.14% | 887 | 9.45% |
| Fayette | | 19,509 | 18,053 | 92.54% | 200 | 1.02% | 40 | 0.20% | 78 | 0.40% | 1 | 0.01% | 31 | 0.16% | 586 | 3.00% | 520 | 2.67% |
| Floyd | | 15,627 | 13,907 | 88.99% | 415 | 2.66% | 29 | 0.19% | 293 | 1.87% | 12 | 0.08% | 14 | 0.09% | 407 | 2.60% | 550 | 3.52% |
| Franklin | | 10,019 | 8,034 | 80.19% | 32 | 0.32% | 18 | 0.18% | 49 | 0.49% | 0 | 0.00% | 26 | 0.26% | 226 | 2.26% | 1,634 | 16.31% |
| Fremont | | 6,605 | 6,145 | 93.04% | 10 | 0.15% | 19 | 0.29% | 8 | 0.12% | 5 | 0.08% | 20 | 0.30% | 208 | 3.15% | 190 | 2.88% |
| Greene | | 8,771 | 8,188 | 93.35% | 22 | 0.25% | 15 | 0.17% | 48 | 0.55% | 1 | 0.01% | 12 | 0.14% | 229 | 2.61% | 256 | 2.92% |
| Grundy | | 12,329 | 11,791 | 95.64% | 43 | 0.35% | 10 | 0.08% | 24 | 0.19% | 0 | 0.00% | 15 | 0.12% | 301 | 2.44% | 145 | 1.18% |
| Guthrie | | 10,623 | 9,960 | 93.76% | 27 | 0.25% | 21 | 0.20% | 37 | 0.35% | 16 | 0.15% | 51 | 0.48% | 237 | 2.23% | 274 | 2.58% |
| Hamilton | | 15,039 | 12,702 | 84.46% | 88 | 0.59% | 25 | 0.17% | 314 | 2.09% | 0 | 0.00% | 27 | 0.18% | 418 | 2.78% | 1,465 | 9.74% |
| Hancock | | 10,795 | 9,813 | 90.90% | 76 | 0.70% | 22 | 0.20% | 25 | 0.23% | 0 | 0.00% | 3 | 0.03% | 242 | 2.24% | 614 | 5.69% |
| Hardin | | 16,878 | 15,292 | 90.60% | 144 | 0.85% | 25 | 0.15% | 86 | 0.51% | 2 | 0.01% | 32 | 0.19% | 479 | 2.84% | 818 | 4.85% |
| Harrison | | 14,582 | 13,818 | 94.76% | 27 | 0.19% | 25 | 0.17% | 49 | 0.34% | 0 | 0.00% | 24 | 0.16% | 346 | 2.37% | 293 | 2.01% |
| Henry | | 20,482 | 17,643 | 86.14% | 501 | 2.45% | 60 | 0.29% | 451 | 2.20% | 8 | 0.04% | 73 | 0.36% | 663 | 3.24% | 1,083 | 5.29% |
| Howard | | 9,469 | 8,890 | 93.89% | 23 | 0.24% | 33 | 0.35% | 27 | 0.29% | 7 | 0.07% | 14 | 0.15% | 217 | 2.29% | 258 | 2.72% |
| Humboldt | | 9,597 | 8,823 | 91.93% | 53 | 0.55% | 16 | 0.17% | 21 | 0.22% | 6 | 0.06% | 22 | 0.23% | 226 | 2.35% | 430 | 4.48% |
| Ida | | 7,005 | 6,554 | 93.56% | 28 | 0.40% | 0 | 0.00% | 18 | 0.26% | 11 | 0.16% | 16 | 0.23% | 123 | 1.76% | 255 | 3.64% |
| Iowa | | 16,662 | 15,394 | 92.39% | 111 | 0.67% | 29 | 0.17% | 84 | 0.50% | 1 | 0.01% | 57 | 0.34% | 491 | 2.95% | 495 | 2.97% |
| Jackson | | 19,485 | 18,369 | 94.27% | 140 | 0.72% | 33 | 0.17% | 46 | 0.24% | 190 | 0.98% | 51 | 0.26% | 419 | 2.15% | 237 | 1.22% |
| Jasper | | 37,813 | 34,445 | 91.09% | 683 | 1.81% | 91 | 0.24% | 215 | 0.57% | 30 | 0.08% | 104 | 0.28% | 1,158 | 3.06% | 1,087 | 2.88% |
| Jefferson | | 15,663 | 13,425 | 85.71% | 409 | 2.61% | 43 | 0.27% | 500 | 3.19% | 9 | 0.06% | 84 | 0.54% | 583 | 3.72% | 610 | 3.89% |
| Johnson | | 152,854 | 114,491 | 74.90% | 12,643 | 8.27% | 193 | 0.13% | 8,555 | 5.60% | 41 | 0.03% | 534 | 0.35% | 6,199 | 4.05% | 10,198 | 6.67% |
| Jones | | 20,646 | 19,002 | 92.04% | 437 | 2.12% | 53 | 0.26% | 58 | 0.28% | 2 | 0.01% | 63 | 0.31% | 534 | 2.59% | 497 | 2.41% |
| Keokuk | | 10,033 | 9,476 | 94.45% | 47 | 0.47% | 4 | 0.04% | 16 | 0.16% | 0 | 0.00% | 7 | 0.07% | 268 | 2.67% | 215 | 2.14% |
| Kossuth | | 14,828 | 13,758 | 92.78% | 71 | 0.48% | 9 | 0.06% | 71 | 0.48% | 3 | 0.02% | 15 | 0.10% | 298 | 2.01% | 603 | 4.07% |
| Lee | | 33,555 | 29,888 | 89.07% | 896 | 2.67% | 48 | 0.14% | 139 | 0.41% | 8 | 0.02% | 69 | 0.21% | 1,397 | 4.16% | 1,110 | 3.31% |
| Linn | | 230,299 | 187,911 | 81.59% | 16,200 | 7.03% | 382 | 0.17% | 5,345 | 2.32% | 522 | 0.23% | 659 | 0.29% | 10,369 | 4.50% | 8,911 | 3.87% |
| Louisa | | 10,837 | 8,485 | 78.30% | 73 | 0.67% | 11 | 0.10% | 265 | 2.45% | 0 | 0.00% | 14 | 0.13% | 261 | 2.41% | 1,728 | 15.95% |
| Lucas | | 8,634 | 8,154 | 94.44% | 18 | 0.21% | 6 | 0.07% | 29 | 0.34% | 0 | 0.00% | 6 | 0.07% | 223 | 2.58% | 198 | 2.29% |
| Lyon | | 11,934 | 11,175 | 93.64% | 38 | 0.32% | 20 | 0.17% | 24 | 0.20% | 43 | 0.36% | 5 | 0.04% | 222 | 1.86% | 407 | 3.41% |
| Madison | | 16,548 | 15,504 | 93.69% | 44 | 0.27% | 15 | 0.09% | 83 | 0.50% | 9 | 0.05% | 57 | 0.34% | 520 | 3.14% | 316 | 1.91% |
| Mahaska | | 22,190 | 20,259 | 91.30% | 384 | 1.73% | 41 | 0.18% | 250 | 1.13% | 15 | 0.07% | 34 | 0.15% | 727 | 3.28% | 480 | 2.16% |
| Marion | | 33,414 | 30,918 | 92.53% | 281 | 0.84% | 64 | 0.19% | 401 | 1.20% | 21 | 0.06% | 86 | 0.26% | 943 | 2.82% | 700 | 2.09% |
| Marshall | | 40,105 | 27,438 | 68.42% | 785 | 1.96% | 153 | 0.38% | 1,514 | 3.78% | 33 | 0.08% | 59 | 0.15% | 983 | 2.45% | 9,140 | 22.79% |
| Mills | | 14,484 | 13,330 | 92.03% | 77 | 0.53% | 21 | 0.14% | 48 | 0.33% | 10 | 0.07% | 31 | 0.21% | 506 | 3.49% | 461 | 3.18% |
| Mitchell | | 10,565 | 10,080 | 95.41% | 42 | 0.40% | 3 | 0.03% | 45 | 0.43% | 4 | 0.04% | 23 | 0.22% | 175 | 1.66% | 193 | 1.83% |
| Monona | | 8,751 | 8,051 | 92.00% | 28 | 0.32% | 146 | 1.67% | 27 | 0.31% | 2 | 0.02% | 25 | 0.29% | 236 | 2.70% | 236 | 2.70% |
| Monroe | | 7,577 | 7,192 | 94.92% | 18 | 0.24% | 12 | 0.16% | 16 | 0.21% | 2 | 0.03% | 31 | 0.41% | 189 | 2.49% | 117 | 1.54% |
| Montgomery | | 10,330 | 9,603 | 92.96% | 25 | 0.24% | 18 | 0.17% | 21 | 0.20% | 2 | 0.02% | 7 | 0.07% | 283 | 2.74% | 371 | 3.59% |
| Muscatine | | 43,235 | 32,633 | 75.48% | 1,086 | 2.51% | 58 | 0.13% | 404 | 0.93% | 0 | 0.00% | 104 | 0.24% | 1,181 | 2.73% | 7,769 | 17.97% |
| O'Brien | | 14,182 | 12,609 | 88.91% | 159 | 1.12% | 39 | 0.27% | 79 | 0.56% | 11 | 0.08% | 26 | 0.18% | 274 | 1.93% | 985 | 6.95% |
| Osceola | | 6,192 | 5,341 | 86.26% | 28 | 0.45% | 18 | 0.29% | 21 | 0.34% | 36 | 0.58% | 11 | 0.18% | 134 | 2.16% | 603 | 9.74% |
| Page | | 15,211 | 13,686 | 89.97% | 365 | 2.40% | 60 | 0.39% | 117 | 0.77% | 0 | 0.00% | 15 | 0.10% | 504 | 3.31% | 464 | 3.05% |
| Palo Alto | | 8,996 | 8,391 | 93.27% | 52 | 0.58% | 15 | 0.17% | 37 | 0.41% | 6 | 0.07% | 21 | 0.23% | 200 | 2.22% | 274 | 3.05% |
| Plymouth | | 25,698 | 22,941 | 89.27% | 354 | 1.38% | 48 | 0.19% | 111 | 0.43% | 117 | 0.46% | 54 | 0.21% | 577 | 2.25% | 1,496 | 5.82% |
| Pocahontas | | 7,078 | 6,383 | 90.18% | 66 | 0.93% | 10 | 0.14% | 29 | 0.41% | 23 | 0.32% | 24 | 0.34% | 189 | 2.67% | 354 | 5.00% |
| Polk | | 492,401 | 362,260 | 73.57% | 34,990 | 7.11% | 1,081 | 0.22% | 24,313 | 4.94% | 280 | 0.06% | 1,713 | 0.35% | 19,709 | 4.00% | 48,055 | 9.76% |
| Pottawattamie | | 93,667 | 79,181 | 84.53% | 1,836 | 1.96% | 391 | 0.42% | 773 | 0.83% | 76 | 0.08% | 278 | 0.30% | 3,472 | 3.71% | 7,660 | 8.18% |
| Poweshiek | | 18,662 | 17,004 | 91.12% | 320 | 1.71% | 53 | 0.28% | 221 | 1.18% | 21 | 0.11% | 29 | 0.16% | 485 | 2.60% | 529 | 2.83% |
| Ringgold | | 4,663 | 4,447 | 95.37% | 2 | 0.04% | 7 | 0.15% | 8 | 0.17% | 0 | 0.00% | 3 | 0.06% | 125 | 2.68% | 71 | 1.52% |
| Sac | | 9,814 | 9,161 | 93.35% | 46 | 0.47% | 11 | 0.11% | 31 | 0.32% | 6 | 0.06% | 23 | 0.23% | 182 | 1.85% | 354 | 3.61% |
| Scott | | 174,669 | 134,578 | 77.05% | 13,701 | 7.84% | 324 | 0.19% | 4,824 | 2.76% | 57 | 0.03% | 523 | 0.30% | 8,570 | 4.91% | 12,092 | 6.92% |
| Shelby | | 11,746 | 10,890 | 92.71% | 53 | 0.45% | 29 | 0.25% | 49 | 0.42% | 3 | 0.03% | 9 | 0.08% | 301 | 2.56% | 412 | 3.51% |
| Sioux | | 35,872 | 29,919 | 83.40% | 184 | 0.51% | 87 | 0.24% | 219 | 0.61% | 5 | 0.01% | 42 | 0.12% | 502 | 1.40% | 4,914 | 13.70% |
| Story | | 98,537 | 79,944 | 81.13% | 2,980 | 3.02% | 226 | 0.23% | 5,444 | 5.52% | 29 | 0.03% | 335 | 0.34% | 4,547 | 4.61% | 5,032 | 5.11% |
| Tama | | 17,135 | 13,284 | 77.53% | 125 | 0.73% | 1,258 | 7.34% | 80 | 0.47% | 2 | 0.01% | 28 | 0.16% | 554 | 3.23% | 1,804 | 10.53% |
| Taylor | | 5,896 | 5,304 | 89.96% | 1 | 0.02% | 13 | 0.22% | 15 | 0.25% | 1 | 0.02% | 21 | 0.36% | 142 | 2.41% | 399 | 6.77% |
| Union | | 12,138 | 11,223 | 92.46% | 114 | 0.94% | 25 | 0.21% | 65 | 0.54% | 7 | 0.06% | 10 | 0.08% | 295 | 2.43% | 399 | 3.29% |
| Van Buren | | 7,203 | 6,878 | 95.49% | 26 | 0.36% | 6 | 0.08% | 24 | 0.33% | 0 | 0.00% | 3 | 0.04% | 152 | 2.11% | 114 | 1.58% |
| Wapello | | 35,437 | 27,295 | 77.02% | 1,443 | 4.07% | 66 | 0.19% | 622 | 1.76% | 518 | 1.46% | 88 | 0.25% | 1,073 | 3.03% | 4,332 | 12.22% |
| Warren | | 52,403 | 47,897 | 91.40% | 452 | 0.86% | 80 | 0.15% | 380 | 0.73% | 17 | 0.03% | 167 | 0.32% | 1,752 | 3.34% | 1,658 | 3.16% |
| Washington | | 22,565 | 19,958 | 88.45% | 177 | 0.78% | 19 | 0.08% | 113 | 0.50% | 3 | 0.01% | 82 | 0.36% | 601 | 2.66% | 1,612 | 7.14% |
| Wayne | | 6,497 | 6,228 | 95.86% | 10 | 0.15% | 17 | 0.26% | 24 | 0.37% | 1 | 0.02% | 11 | 0.17% | 145 | 2.23% | 61 | 0.94% |
| Webster | | 36,999 | 31,372 | 84.79% | 1,773 | 4.79% | 112 | 0.30% | 295 | 0.80% | 16 | 0.04% | 79 | 0.21% | 1,289 | 3.48% | 2,063 | 5.58% |
| Winnebago | | 10,679 | 9,472 | 88.70% | 204 | 1.91% | 13 | 0.12% | 94 | 0.88% | 3 | 0.03% | 37 | 0.35% | 262 | 2.45% | 594 | 5.56% |
| Winneshiek | | 20,070 | 18,705 | 93.20% | 119 | 0.59% | 19 | 0.09% | 178 | 0.89% | 12 | 0.06% | 33 | 0.16% | 419 | 2.09% | 585 | 2.91% |
| Woodbury | | 105,941 | 72,237 | 68.19% | 5,076 | 4.79% | 1,893 | 1.79% | 2,957 | 2.79% | 651 | 0.61% | 358 | 0.34% | 4,023 | 3.80% | 18,746 | 17.69% |
| Worth | | 7,443 | 6,946 | 93.32% | 60 | 0.81% | 7 | 0.09% | 26 | 0.35% | 1 | 0.01% | 14 | 0.19% | 178 | 2.39% | 211 | 2.83% |
| Wright | | 12,943 | 10,107 | 78.09% | 73 | 0.56% | 15 | 0.12% | 67 | 0.52% | 8 | 0.06% | 15 | 0.12% | 264 | 2.04% | 2,394 | 18.50% |

== Former counties ==
The following counties no longer exist:

- Cook (1836–1837), merged with Muscatine County
- Bancroft (1851–1855), merged with Kossuth County, Namesake: George Bancroft
- Risley (1851–1853), formed Hamilton County
- Yell (1851–1853), formed Webster County, Namesake: Arkansas Governor Archibald Yell
- Crocker (1870–1871), merged with Kossuth County, Namesake: General Marcellus M. Crocker

=== Proposed counties ===
- Belknap (Proposed/Failed 1874) Seceded from Pottawattamie County, Namesake: Secretary of War William Belknap
- Grimes (Proposed/Failed 1876) Seceded from Pottawattamie County, Namesake: Iowa Governor James Grimes
- Larrabee (Proposed 1913/Failed 1914) Seceded from Kossuth County, Namesake: Iowa Governor William Larrabee

== See also ==
- List of cities in Iowa
- List of townships in Iowa
