= Crocker County, Iowa =

Former county in Iowa, United States

Coordinates: 43.31°N 94.25°W

Crocker County
- County of Iowa
- 1870–1871
- Location within the U.S. state of Iowa
- History
  - Established: 1870
  - Disestablished: 1871
- Contained within
  - Country: United States
  - State: (United States) Iowa
Preceded by	Succeeded by
Kossuth County; Bancroft County	Kossuth County
- Today part of: United States

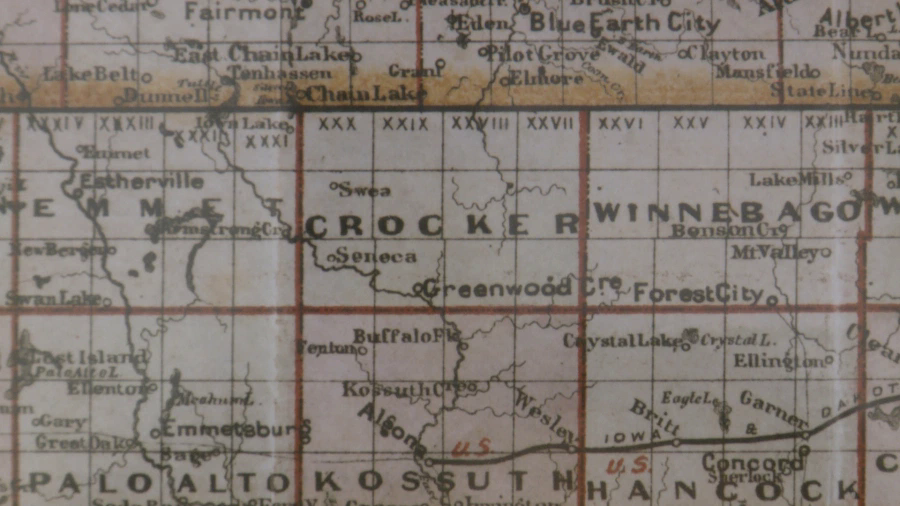
1870 Railroad map showing Crocker County

Crocker County is a defunct county in the U.S. state of Iowa. In 1870, the Iowa General Assembly created Crocker County from the northern part of Kossuth County. The county seat was located at Greenwood, Iowa. In December 1871, the Iowa Supreme Court declared the act creating this county a violation of the constitution, which in article eleven declares that no new county shall be created which contains less than 432 square miles (112,000 ha). As Crocker County was smaller than the law allowed for, it ceased to exist from and after the rendition of that decision and the twelve townships in its territory reverted to Kossuth County.

== Attempts of re-establishment ==
On February 22, 1913, legislation was introduced again to create a new county in the northern area of Kossuth. The proposed region would be called Larrabee County. It was named after governor William Larrabee. The proposal failed after a referendum.

== See also ==
- Bancroft County, Iowa, another county created out of the same area of Kossuth County.
- Larrabee County, Iowa
