= Larrabee County, Iowa =

Historic proposed county

Coordinates: 43.37°N 94.25°W

Map of Iowa highlighting Kossuth County.

Larrabee County was a proposed county to be formed out of the northern part of Kossuth County, Iowa, United States. The county was to be named after governor William Larrabee. Bancroft County had existed in the area for several years in the 1850s, but was disestablished. An attempt to recreate the county out of roughly the same area had taken place in the early 1870s with Crocker County, but its establishment was ruled to be unconstitutional due to being too small in area. In November 1914, a referendum was held in Kossuth County in order to propose the existence of Larrabee County, and voters rejected the county's creation. As such, Kossuth County remained the largest county in Iowa.

== Background ==
Map of Iowa highlighting the defunct Bancroft county.

When Iowa became a state in 1846, it had 48 counties. On January 15, 1851, the third Iowa General Assembly added 52 more. This now made Iowa a state of 100 counties, including Bancroft County. In 1855, Bancroft County was disestablished because it was not suitable for settling due to its marshes and wetlands, making Iowa a state of 99 counties. Its land was merged with Kossuth County, resulting in Kossuth becoming the largest county in Iowa.

On May 13, 1870, after post-Civil War migration to the area, Bancroft County was re-established with the name Crocker County. However, the Iowa Supreme Court ruled in the case L.K. Garfield vs R.I. Brayton that Crocker County was in violation of the Iowa constitution, which declares in Article 11 that "no new county shall be created which contains less than 432 square miles." After Crocker County was disestablished in 1871, its land was merged back into Kossuth County.

== Proposal ==
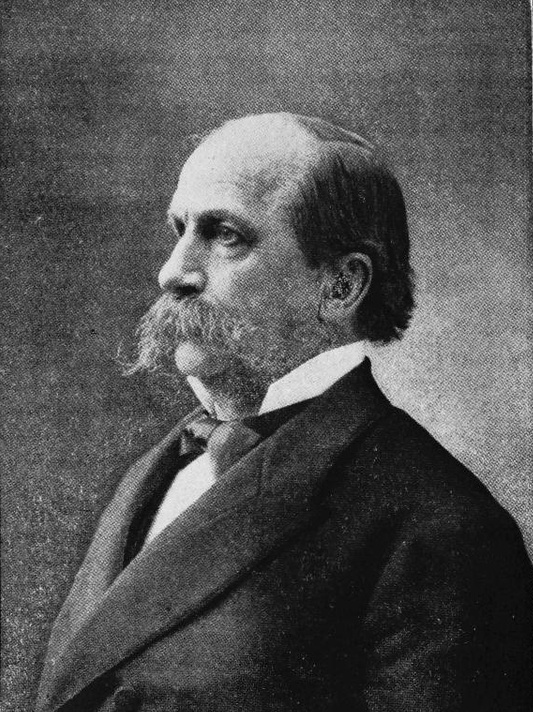
Portrait of William Larrabee, after whom the county was to be named.

On February 22, 1913, the creation of Larrabee County was proposed by James McHose, an Iowa congressman from Boone, Iowa. The name "Larrabee" would honor governor William Larrabee. However, the residents of northern Kossuth County sent a delegation to Des Moines opposing the proposal.

In November 1914, a referendum was held in Kossuth County to determine whether Larrabee County should be established. The proposal received 920 votes compared to the opposition's 3,599 votes; therefore, Larrabee County was not established, causing Iowa to remain a state of 99 counties.
