= Bancroft County, Iowa =

Former county in Iowa, United States

Coordinates: 43.42°N 94.25°W

Bancroft County
- County of Iowa
- 1851–1857
- Location within the U.S. state of Iowa
- History
  - Established: 1851
  - Disestablished: 1857
- Contained within
  - Country: United States
  - State: (United States) Iowa
Preceded by	Succeeded by
Fayette County	Kossuth County

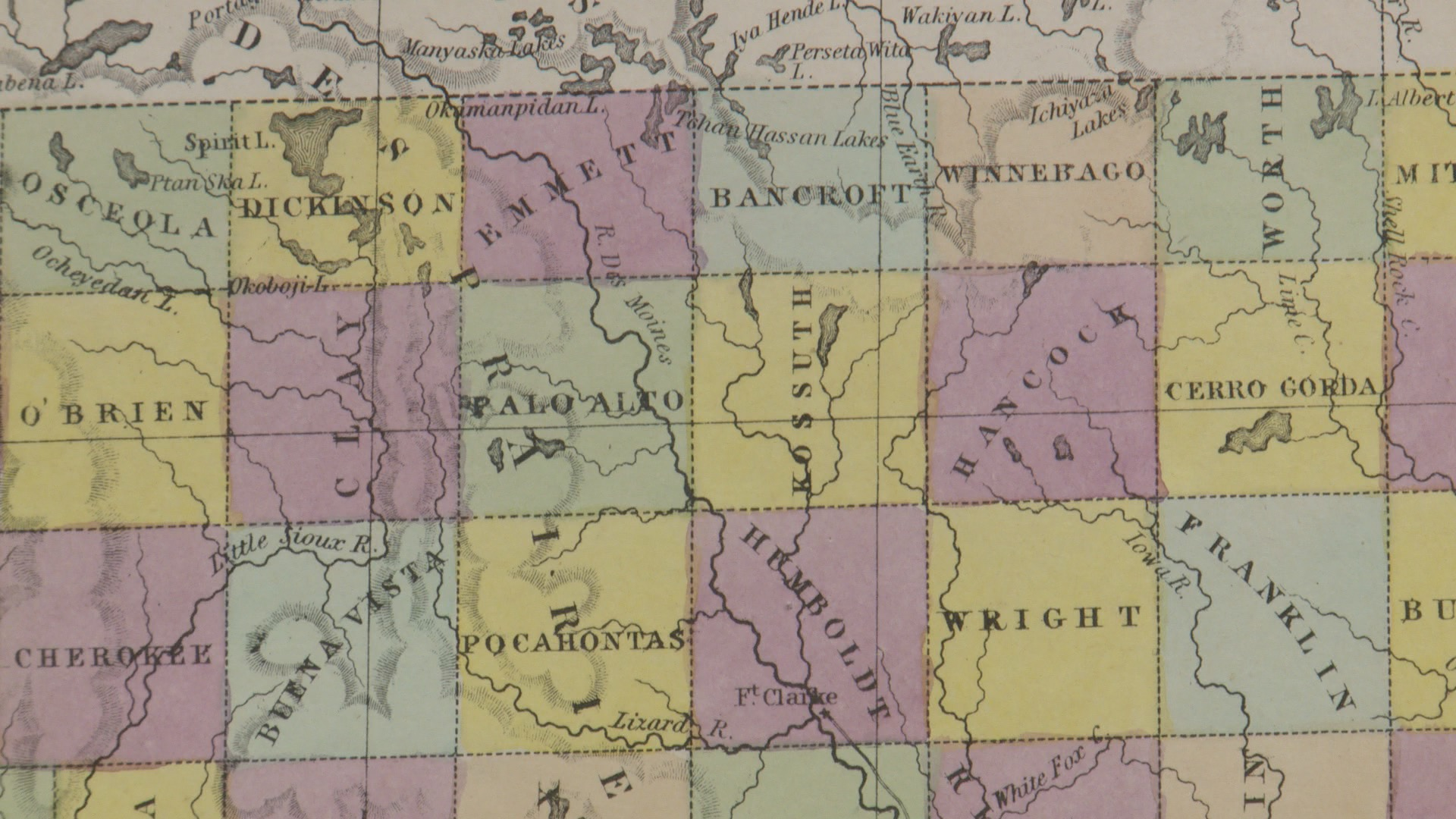
Historic map of Iowa including Bancroft County

Bancroft County, Iowa, was a county located in what today is the northern portion of Kossuth County.

== History ==
The county was established in 1851 by the Iowa General Assembly. The county was named for historian and statesman George Bancroft (1800–1891). There never was a county seat established (the community of Bancroft, Iowa would not be established until 1881) or the organization of a county government.

The county was then abolished six years later and joined to Kossuth County, leading to it being roughly twice the size of adjacent counties. It was abolished because the area was wetland, making it unsuitable for farming. Today, only a small amount of the wetlands remain, mostly at the Union Slough National Wildlife Refuge, with the remainder of the land arable by modern farming standards.

As of the 2020 census, the population of the former Bancroft County is 3,127, less than all current counties in Iowa.

=== Brief reestablishment as Crocker County ===
On May 13, 1870, Crocker County was formed out of the same area as Bancroft County, the 12 northern townships of Kossuth. The county seat of Crocker was Greenwood Center. Many southern Kossuth settlers were unhappy because they did not want the county to be divided, hoping to have the honor of being the largest county. However, it later merged back into Kossuth County when it was discovered that Crocker was unconstitutional as it was under 432 square miles of territory, the minimum according to the Iowa Constitution.

=== Attempt to reestablish as Larrabee County ===
On February 22, 1913, legislation was introduced again to create a new county in the northern area of Kossuth. The proposed region would have been called Larrabee County named after governor William Larrabee.
