= List of Iowa state parks =

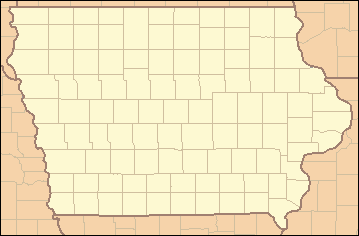
Map of State Parks of Iowa
Hold cursor over locations to display park name;
click to go to park article.
State-managed parks; County-managed parks

This is a list of 63 state parks and recreation areas in Iowa. These state parks of the U.S. state of Iowa can be split into two groups based on management. The first group are those state parks managed by the Iowa Department of Natural Resources (Iowa DNR). The second group are those state parks managed by the county in which they are found.

== DNR-managed state parks ==
Park name	County or counties	Nearby city	Area		Date established	Body of water	Remarks
Park name	County or counties	Nearby city	acres	ha	Date established	Body of water	Remarks
Ambrose A. Call State Park	Kossuth County	Algona	130	53	1925	Des Moines River	Features heavily wooded hills and a reconstructed log cabin on the site of the first cabin in Kossuth County, built in 1854 by settler Ambrose A. Call.
Backbone State Park	Delaware County	Strawberry Point	2,000	810	1919	Maquoketa River, Backbone Lake	Features a rock ridge up to 80 feet (24 m) high, a recreational reservoir, and a museum on the Civilian Conservation Corps in Iowa.
Badger Creek State Recreation Area	Madison County	Van Meter	1,162	470	1980	Badger Creek Lake	Features a 276-acre (112 ha) fishing lake outside Des Moines.
Banner Lakes at Summerset State Park	Warren County	Indianola	222	90	2002	Banner Lakes	Provides fishing and mountain biking opportunities on the site of a rehabilitated open-pit coal mine.
Beed's Lake State Park	Franklin County	Hampton	319	129	1934	Beed's Lake	Surrounds a 99-acre (40 ha) reservoir crossed by a 170-foot (52 m) causeway built by the Civilian Conservation Corps.
Bellevue State Park	Jackson County	Bellevue	770	310		Mississippi River	Comprises two units on high river bluffs, with a nature center and butterfly garden.
Big Creek State Park	Polk County	Polk City	3,550	1,440		Big Creek Lake	Surrounds an 866-acre (350 ha) recreational reservoir originally created as a flood control project.
Black Hawk State Park	Sac County	Lake View	86	35	1935	Black Hawk Lake	Comprises shoreline on the southernmost glacial lake in Iowa.
Brushy Creek State Recreation Area	Webster County	Lehigh	6,500	2,600		Des Moines River, Brushy Creek Reservoir	Forms one of the state's largest public outdoor recreation properties, with a 690-acre (280 ha) reservoir.
Cedar Rock State Park	Buchanan County	Quasqueton	423	171	1981	Wapsipinicon River	Offers tours of a Frank Lloyd Wright house built in 1950 in his Usonian style.
Clear Lake State Park	Cerro Gordo County	Clear Lake	55	22	1924	Clear Lake	Abuts the south shore of 3,643-acre (1,474 ha) Clear Lake.
Dolliver Memorial State Park	Webster County	Lehigh	600	240	1925	Des Moines River	Showcases tall river bluffs and narrow ravines.
Elinor Bedell State Park	Dickinson County	Spirit Lake	80	32	1998	East Okoboji Lake	Provides public access to one of the Iowa Great Lakes.
Elk Rock State Park	Marion County	Knoxville	850	340	1978	Lake Red Rock	Comprises two parcels on Iowa's largest body of water.
Emerson Bay State Recreation Area	Dickinson County	Milford	12	4.9		West Okoboji Lake	Provides public access to one of the Iowa Great Lakes.
Fairport State Recreation Area	Muscatine County	Muscatine	17	6.9		Mississippi River	Provides water recreation opportunities 6 miles (9.7 km) from Wildcat Den State Park.
Fort Atkinson State Preserve	Winneshiek County	Fort Atkinson	5	2.0	1968	None	Interprets the remains of a U.S. Army frontier fort manned from 1840–1849 to monitor the resettled Ho-Chunk tribe.
Fort Defiance State Park	Emmet County	Estherville	221	89	1930	None	Commemorates the site of a fort built to protect the Iowa border during the Dakota War of 1862.
Geode State Park	Henry County	Danville	1,641	664		Skunk River, Lake Geode	Features a 187-acre (76 ha) recreational reservoir and a display of geodes, the Iowa state rock.
George Wyth Memorial State Park	Black Hawk County	Waterloo	1,200	490	1940	Cedar River and several lakes	Protects a natural area within the Waterloo – Cedar Falls metropolitan area.
Green Valley State Park	Union County	Creston	990	400		Green Valley Lake	Surrounds a 390-acre (160 ha) recreational reservoir.
Gull Point State Park	Dickinson County	Milford	195	79	1933	West Okoboji Lake	Protects a natural area on one of the Iowa Great Lakes.
Honey Creek State Park	Appanoose County	Moravia	828	335		Rathbun Lake	Provides outdoor recreation opportunities on the north shore of 11,000-acre (4,500 ha) Rathbun Lake.
Honey Creek Resort State Park	Appanoose County	Moravia	828	335	2008	Rathbun Lake	Mixes outdoor recreation with higher-end amenities such as a lodge, luxury cabins, golf course, and indoor water park.
Lacey-Keosauqua State Park	Van Buren County	Keosauqua	1,653	669	1921	Des Moines River	Protects Indian mounds and a 30-acre (12 ha) lake on a bend of the Des Moines River.
Lake Ahquabi State Park	Warren County	Indianola	770	310	1936	Lake Ahquabi	Surrounds a 115-acre (47 ha) recreational reservoir named "resting place" in the Fox language.
Lake Anita State Park	Cass County	Anita	1,062	430	1961	Lake Anita	Surrounds a 171-acre (69 ha) recreational reservoir.
Lake Darling State Park	Washington County	Brighton	1,387	561	1950	Lake Darling	Honors Ding Darling, two-time Pulitzer Prize for Editorial Cartooning winner and early conservationist, with a 171-acre (69 ha) recreational reservoir.
Lake Keomah State Park	Mahaska County	Oskaloosa	366	148	1934	Lake Keomah	Surrounds an 83-acre (34 ha) recreational reservoir.
Lake Macbride State Park	Johnson County	Solon	2,810	1,140	1937	Lake Macbride, Coralville Lake	Borders an 812-acre (329 ha) recreational reservoir.
Lake Manawa State Park	Pottawattamie County	Council Bluffs	1,529	619		Lake Manawa	Provides boating opportunities in the Omaha – Council Bluffs metropolitan area on a 772-acre (312 ha) lake created by the Missouri River changing course after the Great Flood of 1881.
Lake of Three Fires State Park	Taylor County	Bedford	1,155	467	1935	Lake of Three Fires	Surrounds an 85-acre (34 ha) recreational reservoir named for a Council of Three Fires meeting once held there by three Native American tribes.
Lake Wapello State Park	Davis County	Drakesville	1,150	470		Lake Wapello	Surrounds a 289-acre (117 ha) recreational reservoir.
Ledges State Park	Boone County	Boone	1,200	490	1924	Des Moines River, Pea's Creek	Showcases a 100-foot (30 m) deep sandstone gorge with concretions jutting from its side like ledges.
Lewis and Clark State Park	Monona County	Onawa	176	71		Blue Lake	Commemorates the site where the Lewis and Clark Expedition camped on August 10, 1804; with a replica of their keelboat on a 220-acre (89 ha) oxbow lake.
Lower Gar State Recreation Area	Dickinson County	Arnolds Park	7	2.8		Lower Gar Lake	Provides public access to one of the Iowa Great Lakes.
Maquoketa Caves State Park	Jackson County	Maquoketa	323	131	1921	Raccoon Creek	Preserves 13 caves, some developed with lighting and walkways and others in a natural state.
Marble Beach State Recreation Area	Dickinson County	Orleans	64	26		Spirit Lake	Provides the largest campground in the Iowa Great Lakes region.
McIntosh Woods State Park	Cerro Gordo County	Ventura	62	25	1943	Clear Lake	Provides the primary boating access to 3,643-acre (1,474 ha) Clear Lake.
Mines of Spain State Recreation Area and E. B. Lyons Nature Center	Dubuque County	Dubuque	1,387	561	1981	Mississippi River	Features a monument to Julien Dubuque, the first European settler in Iowa, and recipient of a 1796 land and mining grant from then-owner the Governor of Spain.
Mini-Wakan State Park	Dickinson County	Spirit Lake	20	8.1		Spirit Lake	Lies on the north shore of the state's largest natural lake, in the Iowa Great Lakes region.
Nine Eagles State Park	Decatur County	Davis City	1,119	453		Nine Eagles Lake	Features a 64-acre (26 ha) recreational reservoir and surrounding woods.
Okamanpedan State Park	Emmet County	Dolliver	19	7.7		Okamanpeedan Lake	Provides fishing and boating access on the south shore of a lake on the Iowa – Minnesota border.
Palisades-Kepler State Park	Linn County	Mt. Vernon	840	340	1922	Cedar River	Features dramatic river bluffs and deep ravines on the site of an early 20th Century resort.
Pikes Peak State Park	Clayton County	McGregor	970	390	1935	Mississippi River	Features a 500-foot (150 m) river bluff named by Zebulon Pike several years before documenting Pikes Peak in Colorado.
Pikes Point State Park	Dickinson County	Spirit Lake	15	6.1		West Okoboji Lake	Offers one of the most popular swimming beaches in the Iowa Great Lakes region.
Pilot Knob State Park	Hancock County	Forest City	528	214	1923	Pilot Knob Lake, Dead Man's Lake	Features an observation tower built by the Civilian Conservation Corps on Iowa's second-tallest point, and the state's only sphagnum bog.
Pine Lake State Park	Hardin County	Eldora	585	237		Iowa River, Upper and Lower Pine Lakes	Encompasses two lakes surrounded by 250-year-old eastern white pines.
Pleasant Creek State Recreation Area	Linn County	Palo	1,927	780		Pleasant Creek Lake	Surrounds a 410-acre (170 ha) recreational reservoir located between the cities of Cedar Rapids and Waterloo.
Prairie Rose State Park	Shelby County	Harlan	661	267	1962	Prairie Rose Lake	Surrounds a 218-acre (88 ha) recreational reservoir.
Preparation Canyon State Park	Monona County	Moorhead	344	139		None	Preserves a section of the Loess Hills on the site of a town founded in 1853 by a Mormon splinter group led by Charles B. Thompson.
Red Haw State Park	Lucas County	Chariton	649	263		Red Haw Lake	Surrounds a 72-acre (29 ha) recreational reservoir.
Rice Lake State Park	Winnebago County	Lake Mills	15	6.1		Rice Lake	Abuts a 1,200-acre (490 ha) lake.
Rock Creek State Park	Jasper County	Kellogg	1,697	687	1952	Rock Creek Lake	Surrounds a 602-acre (244 ha) recreational reservoir.
Springbrook State Park	Guthrie County	Yale	920	370	1926	Middle Raccoon River	Features a conservation education center, a rental retreat, a 17-acre (6.9 ha) lake, and public hunting areas.
Stone State Park	Woodbury and Plymouth Counties	Sioux City	1,069	433	1935	Big Sioux River	Preserves a natural section of the Loess Hills.
Templar State Recreation Area	Dickinson County	Spirit Lake	10	4.0		Spirit Lake	Provides a sheltered lagoon for launching boats on the Iowa Great Lakes.
Trapper's Bay State Park	Dickinson County	Lake Park	57	23		Silver Lake	Offers additional public recreation space on the periphery of the Iowa Great Lakes region.
Twin Lakes State Park	Calhoun County	Rockwell City	15	6.1		North Twin Lakes	Comprises two day-use areas on a 453-acre (183 ha) natural lake.
Union Grove State Park	Tama County	Gladbrook	282	114	1938	Union Grove Lake	Surrounds a 110-acre (45 ha) recreational reservoir.
Viking Lake State Park	Montgomery County	Stanton	1,000	400		Viking Lake	Preserves natural areas surrounding a 110-acre (45 ha) recreational reservoir.
Volga River State Recreation Area	Fayette County	Fayette	5,500	2,200		Volga River, Frog Hollow Lake	Provides wildlife habitat and extensive recreation options along a waterway featuring limestone bluffs and old steel bridges.
Walnut Woods State Park	Polk County	West Des Moines	250	100		Raccoon River	Preserves a bottomland hardwood forest within the Des Moines metropolitan area featuring the largest stand of black walnut trees in North America.
Wapsipinicon State Park	Jones County	Anamosa	390	160	1923	Wapsipinicon River, Dutch Creek	Features rocky cave- and crevice-ridden bluffs, a nine-hole golf course, and an 1877 steel bridge that is on the National Register of Historic Places.
Waubonsie State Park	Fremont County	Sidney	1,247	505	1926	Lake Virginia	Showcases unique Loess Hills topography, with rental facilities restored from a former Girl Scout camp.
Wildcat Den State Park	Muscatine County	Muscatine	423	171		Pine Creek	Features 75-foot (23 m) cliffs, rock formations, and several historic structures, including an 1848 gristmill that is on the National Register of Historic Places.
Wilson Island State Recreation Area	Harrison County	Missouri Valley	547	221		Missouri River	Showcases a bottomland hardwood forest on a former sandbar island named after former governor George A. Wilson.

== County-managed state parks ==
The following state parks are managed by local county conservation boards:

Park Name	County or Counties	Nearby City
Bobwhite State Park	Wayne County	Allerton
Cold Springs State Park	Cass County	Lewis
Crystal Lake State Park	Hancock County	Crystal Lake
Eagle Lake State Park	Hancock County	Britt
Echo Valley State Park	Fayette County	West Union
Frank A. Gotch State Park	Humboldt County	Dakota City
Heery Woods State Park	Butler County	Clarksville
Kearny State Park	Palo Alto County	Emmetsburg
Lake Cornelia State Park	Wright County	Cornelia
Lake Icaria State Park	Adams County	Corning
Margo Frankel State Park	Polk County	Saylorville
Mill Creek State Park	O'Brien County	Paullina
Oak Grove State Park	Sioux County	Hawarden
Oakland Mills State Park	Henry County	Oakland Mills
Pammel State Park	Madison County	Winterset
Sharon Bluffs State Park	Appanoose County	Centerville
Spring Lake State Park	Greene County	Grand Junction
Swan Lake State Park	Carroll County	Carroll
Three Mile Lake State Park	Union County	Creston

== See also ==
- List of Iowa state forests
- List of Iowa State Preserves
