= Elinor Bedell State Park =

State park in Dickinson County, Iowa

- Location within Iowa Location within the United States
- Location: Dickinson County, Iowa, United States
- Coordinates: 43°24′44″N 95°4′14″W
- Area: 80 acres (32 ha)
- Elevation: 1,408 ft (429 m)
- Established: 1998
- Administrator: Iowa Department of Natural Resources
- Website: Official website

Elinor Bedell State Park is a public recreation area in Dickinson County, Iowa, United States. The state park is located on the east shore of East Okoboji Lake and represents one of the last remaining open spaces on the Iowa Great Lakes. The 80-acre (32 ha) park was a gift of former U.S. Congressman Berkley Bedell and his wife Elinor.

== Geography ==
The park preserves prairie, wetland, and oak savannah. Trees include red, white and black oak, aspens, Eastern white and Scots pine, and red and sugar maples. Nearby towns include Spirit Lake about 2 miles (3.2 km) northwest of the park, and Okoboji and Arnolds Park about 5 miles (8.0 km) around the lake to the southwest.

== Facilities ==
A small campground has eight sites with full RV hookups, a youth group site, a playground, modern restroom and a holding tank dump station. A shelter overlooking the lake can be rented for private events. There is no beach or boat ramp within the park but several are accessible at other public facilities around the Iowa Great Lakes.

== Recreation ==
Elinor Bedell State Park has several miles of trails. A wildlife viewing blind is situated just off the trail for use by bird and wildlife watchers. The area's lakes support game fish such as walleye, northern pike, smallmouth bass, white bass, perch, bluegills, crappies, catfish, and bullheads.
