= Marble Beach State Recreation Area =

State recreation area in Iowa, United States

- Location within Iowa Location within the United States
- Location: Dickinson County, Iowa, United States
- Nearest city: Orleans, Iowa
- Coordinates: 43°28′12″N 95°07′27″W
- Area: 64 acres (26 ha)
- Elevation: 1,408 ft (429 m)
- Established: 1944
- Administrator: Iowa Department of Natural Resources
- Website: Official website

Marble Beach State Recreation Area is a 64-acre (26 ha) state recreation area in Dickinson County, Iowa, United States, near the city of Orleans. The recreation area is located on the western shore of Big Spirit Lake and is one of several state parks and recreation areas in the Iowa Great Lakes region. The park includes a large campground, a boat ramp onto the lake and fishing areas.

The area was named Marble Beach in 1944, shortly after it was acquired by the Iowa Department of Natural Resources. The name honored one of the families killed in the Spirit Lake Massacre.
