= Templar State Recreation Area =

State recreation area in Iowa, United States

- Location within Iowa Location within the United States
- Location: Dickinson County, Iowa, United States
- Nearest city: Orleans, Iowa
- Coordinates: 43°27′24″N 95°07′04″W
- Area: 10 acres (4.0 ha)
- Administrator: Iowa Department of Natural Resources
- Website: Official website
- Templar Park
- Formerly listed on the U.S. National Register of Historic Places
- Area: 29 acres (12 ha)
- Built: 1918
- NRHP reference No.: 77000511

Significant dates
- Added to NRHP: August 3, 1977
- Removed from NRHP: September 13, 2006

Templar State Recreation Area is a 10-acre (4.0 ha) state recreation area in Dickinson County, Iowa, United States, near the city of Orleans. The recreation area is located on the western shore of Big Spirit Lake, the largest of the Iowa Great Lakes, and is one of several state parks and recreation areas in the Great Lakes region. Its amenities include a boat ramp, fishing areas, and picnic buildings; the boat ramp is on a lagoon, which shelters boaters from winds on the lake.

Before the state acquired the land, the park was known as Templar Park and was owned and operated by the Knights Templar. The knights built a hotel on the property for members and their families in 1890 and replaced it with a new hotel after it burned down in 1917. In addition to being a vacation spot, the hotel hosted the Grand Conclave, the annual meeting of Iowa's chapter of the knights. Although the park was placed on the National Register of Historic Places in 1977, it was sold the following year and the hotel was subsequently demolished.
