= Emerson Bay State Recreation Area =

State recreation area in Iowa, United States

- Location within Iowa Location within the United States
- Location: Dickinson County, Iowa, United States
- Nearest city: Milford, Iowa
- Coordinates: 43°21′20″N 95°10′32″W
- Area: 12 acres (4.9 ha)
- Administrator: Iowa Department of Natural Resources
- Website: Official website

Emerson Bay State Recreation Area is a 12-acre (4.9 ha) state recreation area in Dickinson County, Iowa, United States, near the city of Milford. The recreation area is on the western shore of West Okoboji Lake, one of the Iowa Great Lakes, and is one of several state parks and recreation areas in the Great Lakes region. It features an observation tower, a boat ramp, and a beach along the lake. Other amenities at the park include a modern campground, a playground, and a picnic shelter.
