= Lake Okoboji =

Lake Okoboji may refer to:

- West Okoboji Lake, in Iowa
- East Okoboji Lake, in Iowa
