= Mini-Wakan State Park =

- Location within Iowa Location within the United States
- Location: Dickinson County, Iowa, United States
- Coordinates: 43°29′51″N 95°06′12″W
- Area: 20 acres (8.1 ha)
- Elevation: 1,404 feet (428 m)
- Established: 1936
- Administrator: Iowa Department of Natural Resources
- Website: Official website
- Mini-Wakan State Park Historic District
- U.S. National Register of Historic Places
- U.S. Historic district
- Built: 1934
- Built by: Civilian Conservation Corps
- Architect: Amos Barton Emery
- Architectural style: Rustic
- MPS: CCC Properties in Iowa State Parks MPS
- NRHP reference No.: 10000021
- Added to NRHP: February 17, 2010

Mini-Wakan State Park is located north of Spirit Lake, Iowa, United States. The 20-acre (8.1 ha) park is along the north shore of Big Spirit Lake. It provides space for picnicking, hiking, biking, swimming, boating and fishing on the lake. The park is connected to the Dickinson County trail system in Iowa and the Jackson County trail system in Minnesota. It was listed as a historic district on the National Register of Historic Places in 2010.

== History ==
Local residents acquired the initial 12.5 acres (5.1 ha) for Mini-Wakan. Civilian Conservation Corps Company 778 began park development sometime between the beginning of June and the end of October 1933 as part of their work with the National Forest Service. Their work included grading for a road, building the picnic and parking area, the stone gate pillars, and placing riprap along the lake shore. Work on the shelter house was completed in 1934 after they were transferred to the National Park Service. The park was put under the jurisdiction of Gull Point State Park in 1936.
