= Iowa Confluence Water Trails =

Funded recreation group in Iowa, US

Iowa Confluence Water Trails is a funded group in the US state of Iowa, with a set of projects that aim to create more recreation opportunities and conserve Iowa waterways. The organization began in 2015 with a grant from the Iowa Department of Natural Resources, a plan was created to expand the excess and recreation of rivers in central Iowa. They have contributed to 86 project sites, many still being planned and executed. The largest project they are pursuing is white water rapids in downtown Des Moines, Iowa on the Des Moines River. This project is expected to cost $114 million and contains 3 main access points or locations, Scott Avenue, Harriet Street, and Fleur Drive. The locations will have added modifications to current structures and create recreation features to the river. The current director of ICON is Maggie McClelland.

== Scott Avenue ==
The Scott Avenue location will have the current dam modified to allow kayaks to pass along and lower the dam with a cascading fish passage to allow fish to swim through the area safely. Additionally the project adds recreational features on the Southern side of the river, the hillside to the south of the river will also be smoothed to allow people to walk down to the river. This location is expected to be completed in the summer of 2026. For the time of its construction there is a live feed available for viewing.

== Harriet Street or Center Street ==
The Harriet Street location will include boat launch areas, kayak launches, parking and walkways, ziplines, and a wetland to manage water runoff. The current one drop in the river will be spread across 3 drops with light rapids included for kayaking and surfing. There will also be additional rock climbing features and skating nearby. This site is expected to open to the public in the spring of 2025.

== Fleur Drive ==
The Fleur Drive location will include modifications to mitigate the dam such as changing water levels in steppes. It is aimed to be a less challenging area for children and people who want a lesser challenge. It will add fish and recreational passages, and wave features for recreation with kayaks and paddle boards. Like the Scott Avenue access point this location also requires work to slope the steep hills on the bank to allow access to the river. It is expected to be completed in the summer of 2027.
