= Honey Creek State Park (Iowa) =

State park in Appanoose County, Iowa

- Location within Iowa Location within the United States
- Location: Appanoose County, Iowa, United States
- Nearest city: Moravia, Iowa
- Coordinates: 40°51′40″N 92°56′10″W
- Area: 828 acres (335 ha)
- Administrator: Iowa Department of Natural Resources
- Website: Official website

Honey Creek State Park is an 828-acre (335 ha) public recreation area located in Appanoose County, Iowa, United States. Park offerings include interpretive trails, hiking trails, swimming, boating and fishing.

== History ==
Native Americans of the Woodland period lived in the region that the park now occupies, leaving behind mounds that can still be found in the area. People visiting the park can learn about these early inhabitants at the Woodland Interpretive Trail.

A dam was built at the Chariton River following authorization from Congress in 1954, to resolve flooding and drought problems in the river valley. In 1969, the dam was finished by the United States Army Corps of Engineers, creating Rathbun Lake, which helps protect the land around the Chariton River.

A fish hatchery was started in 1979, below the dam, with a space of 375 acres which has fish such as walleye and striped bass. The hatchery has a visitor center and an observation walkway.

== Description ==
The state park, located on a peninsula that is along part of Rathbun Lake's shore, has an area of 828 acres. A campground is within the park that has 149 camping spots with some of these spots having electricity. There are other activities which include hiking on a nature trail, snowmobiling, and boating. Waterfowl, pheasants, squirrels, and other game animals can be hunted at the Rathbun Wildlife Unit. Other places to hunt are located alongside the river in designated areas.

Honey Creek Resort is "[j]ust across from the Honey Creek boat ramp and a short drive from the park". It had financial trouble in 2012 due to not being able to pay off its debt. Governor Terry Branstad attempted to fix the financial issues by giving the state park money from the surplus of Iowa's budget. Chuck Gipp, the Iowa Department of Natural Resources director, said of the situation, "It is making money. But, it’s not making enough money to pay off the bonds and the interest." The finances were completely paid by the state's treasury.
