= McIntosh Woods State Park =

State park in Iowa, United States

- Location within Iowa Location within the United States
- Location: Cerro Gordo County, Iowa, United States
- Nearest city: Ventura, Iowa
- Coordinates: 43°07′33″N 93°27′32″W
- Area: 60 acres (24 ha)
- Established: 1944
- Administrator: Iowa Department of Natural Resources
- Website: Official website

McIntosh Woods State Park is a 60-acre (24 ha) state park in Cerro Gordo County, Iowa, United States, near the city of Ventura. The park, which opened in 1944, is located on the north shore of Clear Lake, the second-largest lake in the state. It is a popular access point to the lake for fishers and boaters on account of its three-lane boat ramp.

In addition to the boat ramp, the park includes two jetties, a fish cleaning station, a beach, and a sandbar jutting into the lake. It is also unique among Iowa state parks for its two yurts, traditional central Asian tents that can be rented by campers. A modern campground with electric and non-electric sites is also available. The park also has a 1.5-mile (2.4 km) boardwalk hiking trail through marshland and a 1-mile (1.6 km) bicycle trail.
