= PM Park, Clear Lake, Iowa =

Coordinates: 43.116°N 93.420°W

PM Park is a restaurant and lodging establishment in Clear Lake, Iowa. It was previously run by the Patriarchs Militant as a children’s summer camp for the less fortunate.

== History ==
What is now PM park has its roots in the Oddfellows, which was founded in the United Kingdom in the 18th century. Eventually, the Odd Fellows found their way to the United States, where they founded an independent chapter in Baltimore, Maryland in 1819.

According to Patriarchs Militant literature, occasionally a war would erupt and the men would be summoned to fight, but someone would have to stay behind to take care of the children, the orphans, women who were left alone, and the elderly who still needed care. These people were called the Patriarchs Militant.

The Patriarchs Militant are the uniformed branch of the Independent Order of Odd Fellows (I.O.O.F.), established in 1886 by the Sovereign Grand Lodge, the international governing body of the Independent Order of Odd Fellows. The Patriarchs Militant were known as protectors; the motto the Patriarchs lived by was “Justitia Universalis, Pax aut Bellum”, (Universal Justice, Peace or War).

In 19th century America (and Britain and Australia), orphanages were common. As part of their role to care for the widows and orphans, the Patriarchs Militant set up "PM Parks". At one point in time, every state in America had one or more PM Parks. The Clear Lake PM Park is one of the few PM Parks left.

There were two purposes of PM Park. The first was to provide a gathering of places for meetings and training sessions of the Patriarchs. The second was to provide a summer camp for children who were less fortunate. PM Parks gave children a summer vacation in a life that didn’t offer much luck.

The PM Park in Clear Lake, Iowa was established in 1914. When it was first built, it included two buildings. One of the buildings was used for a gathering place for eating and entertainment. The other building, that sits right next to the first, was a dormitory for the children to stay in. They are located on the south side of the lake.

Still to this day the PM Park in Clear Lake, Iowa is owned by the Patriarchs Militant. The Patriarchs lease out the facilities to Cristine and Rahn Bragger to run restaurant and lodging facilities.

At least once a year, the Patriarchs Militant make their way to the park for a week at a time holding meetings, ceremonies, and various other events. This point of time is called PM Week.

== Present Situation ==
Currently the PM Park establishment is a small summer retreat that offers a variety of options.

The main building that was once used for a gathering place for eating and entertainment for the children’s camp is being used as a restaurant. The main floor holds the kitchen and two dining rooms. One dining room overlooks the lake, and the other overlooks a large lawn, with some view of the lake and landscaping. The restaurant offers breakfast, lunch and dinner. On the second floor of the building there is a party room to hold events anywhere from a wedding to a class reunion.

The second building original to the park that was once the dormitory is still being used for lodging. The rooms have been modified to accommodate individuals and not just a group of children.

PM Park also offers short term apartments that are available just up the road from the restaurant, as well as a cottage for summer rental. This expansion has allowed more space for families to come and relax as well as offer a more long term experience.

The newest addition to PM Park is a lake side Tiki Bar. The bar was built and opened in the summer of 2007. The bar only offers beverages and closes at midnight to respect the neighbors around PM Park. PM Park also offers lake access with a dock to anyone who cares to come by way of boat.

PM Park is open from mid May to mid September, seven days a week.

== See also ==
- Clear Lake, Iowa
- Cerro Gordo County, Iowa
- Clear Lake (Iowa)
