= Clear Lake Park =

Clear Lake Park may refer to:

- Clear Lake State Park (disambiguation), parks in several US states
- Clearlake Park, California
