= Abbie Gardner =

Abbie Gardner may refer to:

- Abbie Gardner (musician), member of the band Red Molly
- Abbie Gardner-Sharp, survivor of the Spirit Lake Massacre
