= Union Grove State Park =

Union Grove State Park may refer to:

- Union Grove State Park (Iowa)
- Union Grove State Park (South Dakota)
