= Badger Creek State Recreation Area =

Recreation park in Iowa, U.S.

- Location within Iowa Location within the United States
- Interactive map of Badger Creek State Recreation Area
- Location: Madison County, Iowa, United States
- Nearest city: Van Meter, Iowa
- Coordinates: 41°28′27″N 93°54′41″W
- Area: 700 acres (280 ha)
- Administrator: Iowa Department of Natural Resources
- Website: Official website

Badger Creek State Recreation Area is a state recreation area in Madison County, Iowa, United States, near the city of Van Meter. The park covers over 700 acres (280 ha) of land and includes the 276-acre (112 ha) Badger Creek Lake. The lake has two boat ramps and multiple fishing jetties; fish living in the lake include bass, bluegill, catfish, and crappie. The entire recreation area is also open for hunting.

The recreation area is known for its annual sunflower field. The field, which is located in a different spot each year, is planted in spring and typically blooms in July or August. In addition to attracting visitors and photographers, the flowers bring deer and birds into the recreation area before the fall hunting season.
