= Clear Lake State Park =

Clear Lake State Park can be one of several places:

- Clear Lake State Park (California)
- Clear Lake State Park (Iowa)
- Clear Lake State Park (Michigan)
