= Brushy Creek State Recreation Area =

State park in Webster County, Iowa, United States

- Location within Iowa Location within the United States
- Location: Webster County, Iowa, United States
- Coordinates: 42°24′08″N 93°59′23″W
- Area: 6,500 acres (2,600 ha)
- Elevation: 1,053 ft (321 m)
- Administrator: Iowa Department of Natural Resources
- Website: Official website

Brushy Creek State Recreation Area is a state park in Webster County, Iowa in the United States. With an area encompassing over 6,500 acres (2,600 ha), the facility is one of Iowa's largest public outdoor recreation areas.

== History ==
In 1967, the Iowa Department of Natural Resources published a controversial proposal to flood Brushy Creek's forested canyon. The proposal was met with enough public opposition that the idea was debated for the next twenty years. The resultant compromise called for the DNR to protect a sensitive 260-acre (1.1 km^{2}) parcel, construct a smaller lake of 690 acres (280 ha), and purchase more land to build equestrian trails (1,750 acres).

== Facilities ==
The park offers picnic areas, open shelters, campgrounds, equestrian camping, fishing for smallmouth bass and panfish, boat ramps and fishing jetties around a 690-acre (280 ha) lake, swimming beach, 45 miles (72 km) of multi-use trails for horseback riding, hiking, snowmobiling, cross country skiing and mountain biking, hunting and two shooting ranges.
