= Twin Lakes State Park (Iowa) =

State park in Iowa, United States

- Location within Iowa Location within the United States
- Location: Calhoun County, Iowa, United States
- Nearest city: Rockwell City, Iowa
- Coordinates: 42°28′45″N 94°37′49″W
- Area: 15 acres (6.1 ha)
- Elevation: 1,214 ft (370 m)
- Administrator: Iowa Department of Natural Resources
- Website: Official website

Twin Lakes State Park is a 15-acre (6.1 ha) state park in Calhoun County, Iowa, United States, located near the city of Rockwell City. The park is composed of two areas on the eastern and western shores of the 453-acre (183 ha) North Twin Lake. It includes two beaches and fishing sites on the lake; while there are no boating facilities in the park itself, two public boat ramps can be found on the lake's south shore. The lake is home to bluegill, crappie, and walleye. The park also includes a picnic shelter built by the Civilian Conservation Corps in its eastern unit and a playground in its western unit. The eastern unit connects to a 7-mile (11 km) bike trail around the lake.
