= Nine Eagles State Park =

State park in Decatur County, Iowa

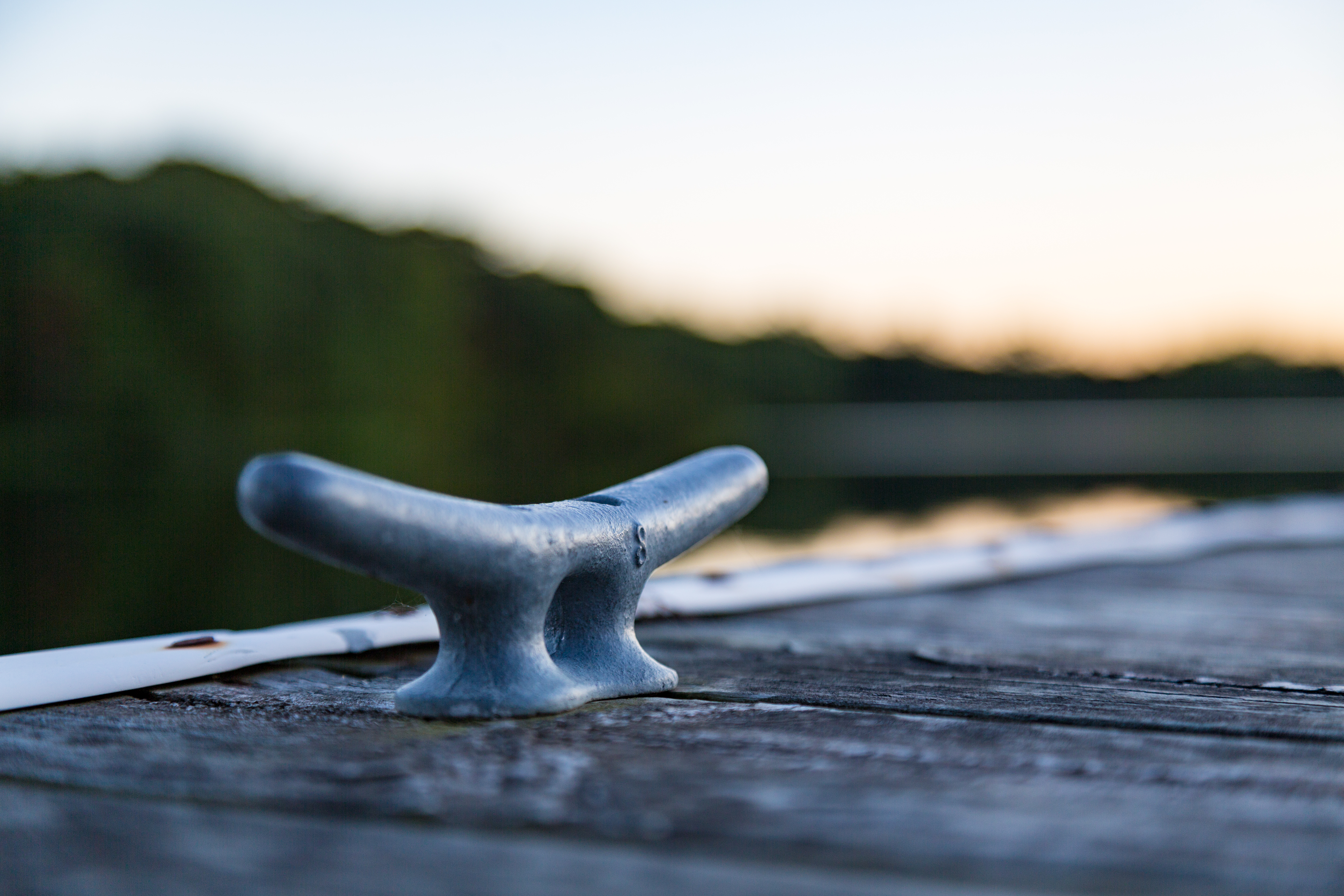
- One of the lake's docks

- Location within Iowa Location within the United States
- Location: Decatur County, Iowa, United States
- Nearest city: Davis City, Iowa
- Coordinates: 40°35′54″N 93°46′10″W
- Area: 1,100 acres (450 ha)
- Elevation: 938 ft (286 m)
- Administrator: Iowa Department of Natural Resources
- Website: Official website

Nine Eagles State Park is a 1,100-acre (450 ha) state park in Decatur County, Iowa, United States, near the city of Davis City. The park is located within a hilly area of the state and includes a 64-acre (26 ha) lake.

The park offers 9 miles (14 km) of hiking trails through forest and prairie landscapes, including a 3-mile (4.8 km) trail around the lake. It also has a 7-mile (11 km) horse trail that is open to snowmobiles in the winter. The lake has a beach along with amenities for fishing and boating, including a boat ramp, a jetty, and five smaller docks. Fish species in the lake include bluegill, channel catfish, and largemouth bass. The park has three developed campgrounds with electric and non-electric campsites along with a family cabin and primitive equestrian campsites.
