= Rice Lake State Park (Iowa) =

State park in Iowa, United States

- Location within Iowa Location within the United States
- Location: Winnebago County, Iowa, United States
- Coordinates: 43°23′18″N 93°29′34″W
- Area: 15 acres (6.1 ha)
- Elevation: 1,247 ft (380 m)
- Administrator: Iowa Department of Natural Resources
- Website: Official website

Rice Lake State Park is a 15-acre (6.1 ha) state park in Winnebago County, Iowa, United States, near the city of Lake Mills. The park is located on the south shore of Rice Lake and provides fishing and boating access to the lake. The lake is home to bass, bluegill, yellow perch, and walleye. It is also visited by migratory birds during their migrations, making it a popular birdwatching site. The park also contains a stone picnic shelter that was built in 1934 by the Civilian Conservation Corps.
