= Clear Lake State Park (Iowa) =

State park in Iowa, United States

- Location within Iowa Location within the United States
- Interactive map of Clear Lake State Park
- Location: Cerro Gordo County, Iowa, United States
- Nearest city: Clear Lake, Iowa
- Coordinates: 43°06′38″N 93°23′33″W
- Area: 50 acres (20 ha)
- Established: 1924
- Administrator: Iowa Department of Natural Resources
- Website: Clear Lake State Park

Clear Lake State Park is a 50-acre (20 ha) public recreation area located at the southwest corner of the city of Clear Lake, Cerro Gordo County, Iowa, United States. The state park sits on the south shore of Clear Lake, the second-largest lake in Iowa. The park was developed in 1924.

== History ==
Clear Lake State Park saw its inception with the state's initial acquisition of land in 1924. The remaining modern-day beach area was purchased the next year. The park opened to the public in the spring of 1925. These dates put the park in league with the very first Iowa state parks, which have been typically listed as (1) Backbone State Park (1920), (2) Ledges State Park (1924), and (3) Dolliver Memorial State Park (1925). The park saw the addition in 1938 of a day-use lodge built by the Works Progress Administration. Additional property was acquired in the 1960s and 1970s.

== Woodford Island ==
3-acre (1.2 ha) Woodford Island is located just off the park shoreline and is managed as a wildlife habitat and favored fishing hole. The island was donated to the state in 1971 by descendants of C. R. Woodford, who had turned it into a family retreat following its failure as the site of a hotel and summer resort.

== Facilities ==
Park features include picnic grounds, swimming beach, hiking trails, campgrounds, and a Depression-era day-use lodge built by the Works Progress Administration.
