= Prairie Rose State Park =

State park in Iowa, United States

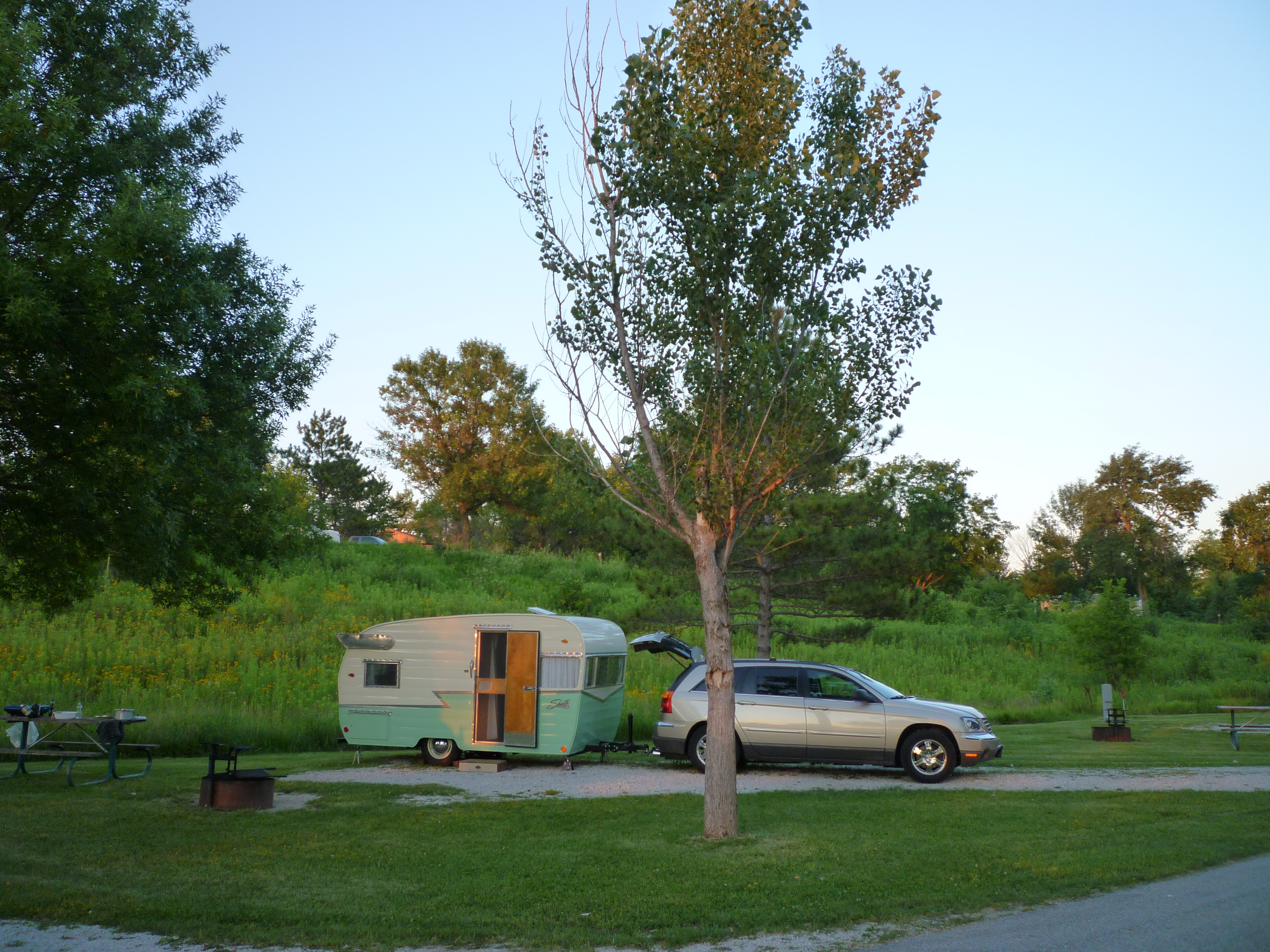
- A campsite at Prairie Rose State Park

- Location within Iowa Location within the United States
- Location: Shelby County, Iowa, United States
- Nearest city: Harlan, Iowa
- Coordinates: 41°36′13″N 95°13′04″W
- Area: 422 acres (171 ha)
- Elevation: 1,227 ft (374 m)
- Administrator: Iowa Department of Natural Resources
- Website: Official website

Prairie Rose State Park is a 422-acre (171 ha) state park in Shelby County, Iowa, United States, located near the city of Harlan. The park, which was established in 1962, surrounds the 218-acre (88 ha) Prairie Rose Lake, a manmade reservoir created in the 1950s. Both the lake and the park were named after the defunct community of Prairie Rose.

Recreational opportunities at the park include boating and fishing on the lake, which has two boat ramps and several jetties along with an overnight fishing area. Fish living in the lake include bass, bluegill, channel catfish, and crappie. There is also a Spillway which at the bottom holds other kinds of fish like carp and gar. The lake also features a sand beach with a volleyball court and playground. Aside from the lake, the park contains 7 miles (11 km) of multi-use trails and an interpretive trail. The park has two campgrounds, each of which includes a cabin and electric and non-electric campsites.
