= University of Okoboji =

Fictional university in Iowa, U.S.

The University of Okoboji is a fictional university in the state of Iowa in the United States of America. The university was the creation of three brothers in the early 1970s, who printed T-shirts with an "official" school crest. The word "Okoboji" refers to several lakes, and to the town of Okoboji, in the Iowa Great Lakes region that are popular recreational destinations.

The university is home of the "undefeated" Fighting Phantoms.

It is a common joke among locals to claim alumni status, giving no indication that the university is fictional. These alumni display university decor, such as car decals and T-shirts, to show their pride in attending the University. The name is now used in connection with several annual fund-raising events for charity, including bike rides, a marathon, and a winter games competition. A local radio station, KUOO, joined in on the joke and has referred to itself as the "campus radio" since its first broadcast in 1985. Founder Paul Hedburg stated on said broadcast that "We’re brand new and we have to establish our credibility just like the University of Okoboji has established its credibility."
