= Abbie Gardner-Sharp =

Spirit Lake Massacre abductee (1843–1921)

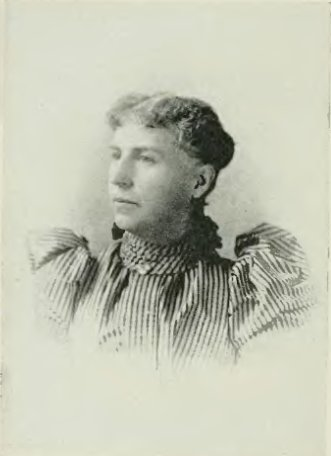
- Born: Abigail Gardner; 1843; New York, United States
- Died: January 17, 1921 (aged 77–78); Spirit Lake, Iowa, United States
- Known for: Spirit Lake Massacre abductee, memoirist

Abbie Gardner-Sharp (1843 – January 17, 1921) was one of four young women abducted by Inkpaduta during the Spirit Lake Massacre.

She was born in 1843 in New York State to Rowland Gardner and Frances M. Smith. She was the third of four children – Mary M., Eliza M., Abigail and Rowland, youngest child and only son. Her family moved west to pioneer in Iowa in 1856.

On March 8, 1857, Gardner-Sharp was one of four young women abducted by Inkpaduta during the Spirit Lake Massacre. The Indians involved in the massacre were a band of brigands alienated from their tribal structure (Wahpekuta Sioux) and outlawed by every band.

By May the young teen was ransomed, and after 81 days of captivity, returned to white society. Gardner-Sharp had a long history of illness after the event, likely due to post-traumatic stress disorder, or PTSD.

Very soon after returning home, at the age of 14, Gardner-Sharp married 18 year-old Casville Sharp, with whom she had three children, the youngest a daughter who died in childhood. Her memoir of the abduction and captivity provided income for Gardner-Sharp and her family, and it went into seven editions during her lifetime. In 1891 using proceeds from her book sales, as a quietly divorced mother of two sons, she purchased the property and cabin where as a 14-year old she had seen eight of her family members shot and then beaten to death with firewood, and where across the road her parents and siblings were buried. As the location of the last Indian massacre in Iowa, known nationwide through Gardner-Sharp's memoir, the site became a popular tourist attraction. Gardner-Sharp operated it as a small museum and gift shop. A memorial provided by the State of Iowa was placed on the site.

Gardner-Sharp died on January 17, 1921, and was buried with her birth family near the Abbie Gardner Sharp cabin, which still stands near Arnold's Park in Spirit Lake, Iowa.

== See also ==
- List of kidnappings
- Lists of solved missing person cases
