= Pleasant Creek State Recreation Area =

Protected area in Iowa, United States

- Location within Iowa Location within the United States
- Location: Linn County, Iowa, United States
- Nearest city: Palo, Iowa
- Coordinates: 42°07′09″N 91°48′21″W
- Area: 1,927 acres (780 ha)
- Administrator: Iowa Department of Natural Resources
- Website: Official website

Pleasant Creek State Recreation Area is a 1,927-acre (780 ha) state recreation area in Linn County, Iowa, United States, near the city of Palo. The recreation area is home to the 410-acre (170 ha) Pleasant Creek Lake. Both the lake and the park were formed in the 1960s to provide eastern Iowa with a large recreational lake.

Pleasant Creek Lake features four boat ramps and a kayak launch, and its clear water makes it a popular site for scuba diving. The lake also has several fishing jetties; fish living in the lake include channel catfish, muskellunge, largemouth bass, and white bass. The entire recreation area is also open to hunting. The park includes eight miles (13 km) of multi-use trails used for hiking, horseback riding, mountain biking, and skiing and snowmobiling in the winter. It also has three modern campsites and four camping cabins.
