= Ambrose A. Call State Park =

State park in Iowa, U.S.

- Location within Iowa Location within the United States
- Interactive map of Ambrose A. Call State Park
- Location: Kossuth County, Iowa, United States
- Nearest city: Algona, Iowa
- Coordinates: 43°3′4″N 94°15′0″W
- Area: 138 acres (56 ha)
- Elevation: 1,224 ft (373 m)
- Established: 1925
- Administrator: Iowa Department of Natural Resources
- Website: Official website

Ambrose A. Call State Park is a 138-acre (56 ha) public recreation area in Kossuth County, Iowa, United States, that commemorates the first European settler in Kossuth County. The state park preserves rugged hills of old-growth forest on the East Fork of the Des Moines River.

== History ==
Ambrose A. Call and his brother Asa staked their claim on the site of the future park on July 9, 1854. The next day Ambrose and traveling companion William Smith started building a log cabin while Asa went back to retrieve his family and more supplies. In 1925, Ambrose's daughter donated the site to the state of Iowa for a public park. While the original cabin is gone, a similar structure was moved from a nearby homestead and placed approximately where Ambrose's cabin stood. The park's log cabin-style lodge built in 1928 by the Works Progress Administration.

== Facilities ==
The park offers a log cabin−style lodge for day use, 18-hole disc golf course, campground, two miles (3.2 km) of forest trails and cross-country skiing in winter.
