= Green Valley State Park =

State park in Union County, Iowa

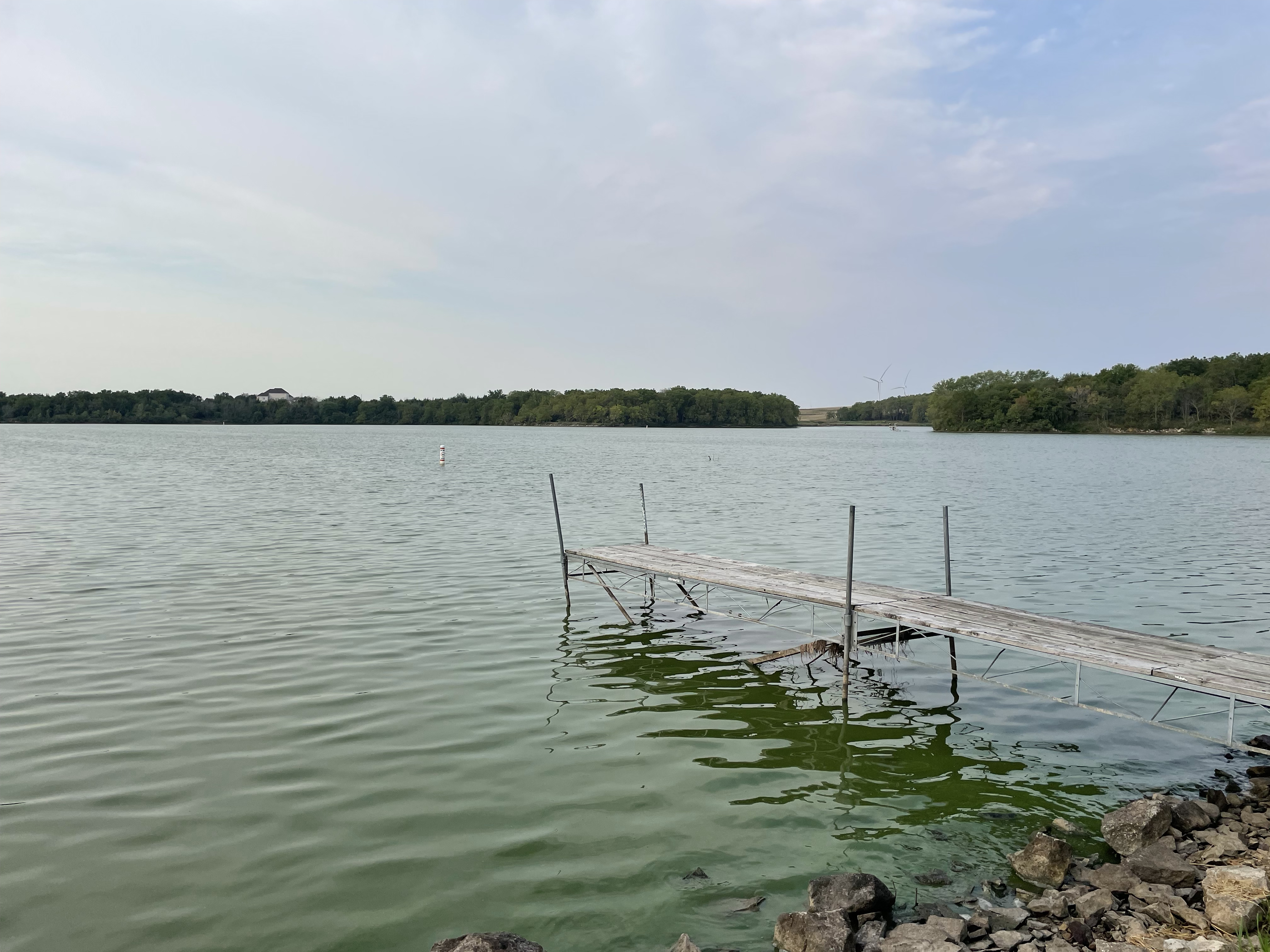

- Location within Iowa Location within the United States
- Location: Union County, Iowa, United States
- Coordinates: 41°06′11″N 94°23′18″W
- Area: 990 acres (400 ha)
- Elevation: 1,270 ft (390 m)
- Established: 1953
- Administrator: Iowa Department of Natural Resources
- Website: Official website

Green Valley State Park is a state park in Union County, Iowa, in the United States. The park is composed of Green Valley Lake and land around it, approximately three miles (4.8 km) north of the town of Creston. Green Valley Lake is an artificial lake, one of a number of such lakes in southwest Iowa created after a special legislation appropriation in 1947.

== History ==
The area used to be filled with tallgrass prairie, but much of that was gone by the time the Iowa Department of Natural Resources (IDNR) bought the land in 1950. Due to a drought in the 1930s, Summit Lake in Creston had no water in 1934 which led to Green Valley Lake being constructed in 1950. The 24 feet (7.3 m) man-made lake was meant to be used for recreation and for the Southwestern Federal Power Cooperative. The recreation area and Green Valley Lake was dedicated as a state park on September 20, 1953. The lake was renovated in 1974 with bluegills, crappies, channel catfish, and largemouth bass being added to it. In the 1980s, a causeway was constructed over the northernmost part of Green Valley Lake to help improve the water's quality. the IDNR started a departmental committee in 1994 to create a framework for all Iowa state parks, with Green Valley State Park being chosen as the first one to implement the changes. A 1994 plan by the Natural Resources Conservation Service, private individuals, and park visitors created nine separate areas for management to protect the state park as well as its lake.

== Resources ==
Green Valley State Park has nearly 10 miles (16 km) of hiking trails that go through wetlands, woodlands, prairie remnants, and near Green Valley Lake. Fishing and boating are offered, including fishing on two piers that are accessible for people with disabilities. There are three cabins and a campground. The flora and fauna include shrubs, wildflowers, muskrats, deer, beavers, and various birds. The state park is near the Mormon Trail.
