= Okoboji, Iowa =

- City
- Location of Okoboji, Iowa
- Coordinates: 43°23′15″N 95°07′55″W
- Country: United States
- State: Iowa
- County: Dickinson

Area
  - Total: 1.76 sq mi (4.56 km^{2})
  - Land: 1.76 sq mi (4.55 km^{2})
  - Water: 0.0039 sq mi (0.01 km^{2})
- Elevation: 1,427 ft (435 m)

Population (2020)
  - Total: 768
  - Density: 437.1/sq mi (168.77/km^{2})
- Time zone: UTC-6 (Central (CST))
  - Summer (DST): UTC-5 (CDT)
- ZIP code: 51355
- Area code: 712
- FIPS code: 19-58710
- GNIS feature ID: 2395314
- Website: okobojicity.com

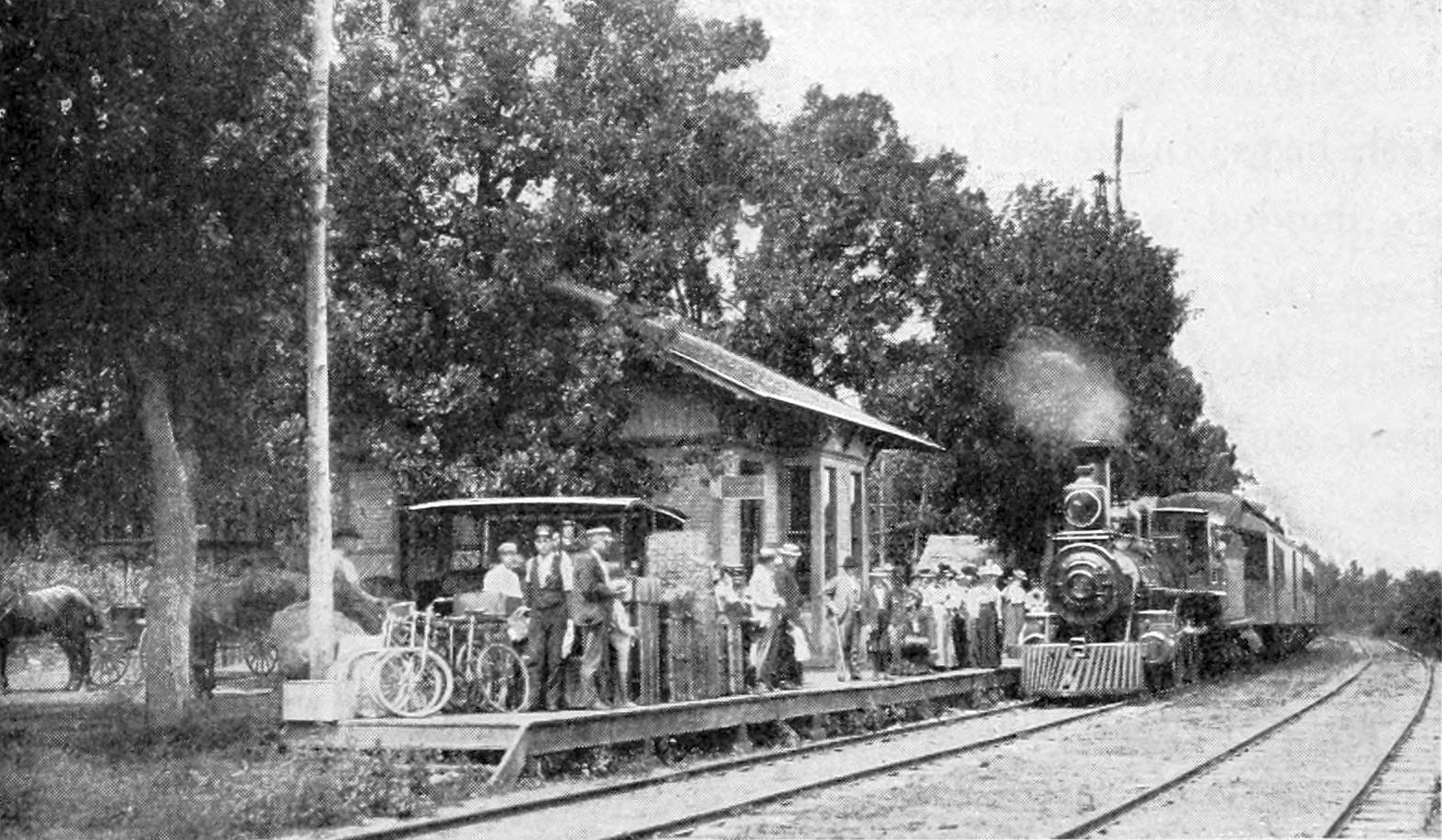
Depot at Okoboji, 1902

Okoboji is a city in Dickinson County, Iowa, United States, along the eastern shore of West Okoboji Lake in the Iowa Great Lakes region. At the time of the 2020 census, its population was 768.

== Geography ==
According to the United States Census Bureau, the city has an area of 1.86 square miles (4.82 km^{2}), of which 1.85 square miles (4.79 km^{2}) is land and 0.01 square miles (0.03 km^{2}) is water.

== Demographics ==
Historical populations
Year	Pop.	±%
1930	176	—
1940	271	+54.0%
1950	336	+24.0%
1960	330	−1.8%
1970	361	+9.4%
1980	559	+54.8%
1990	775	+38.6%
2000	820	+5.8%
2010	807	−1.6%
2020	768	−4.8%
Source:"U.S. Census website". United States Census Bureau. and Iowa Data Center; Source: U.S. Decennial Census

=== 2020 census ===
As of the census of 2020, there were 768 people, 425 households, and 238 families residing in the city. The population density was 437.1 inhabitants per square mile (168.8/km^{2}). There were 1,214 housing units at an average density of 690.9 per square mile (266.8/km^{2}). The racial makeup of the city was 97.4% White, 0.3% Black or African American, 0.0% Native American, 0.4% Asian, 0.0% Pacific Islander, 0.7% from other races and 1.3% from two or more races. Hispanic or Latino persons of any race comprised 1.6% of the population.

Of the 425 households, 15.8% of which had children under the age of 18 living with them, 46.1% were married couples living together, 4.9% were cohabitating couples, 31.8% had a female householder with no spouse or partner present and 17.2% had a male householder with no spouse or partner present. 44.0% of all households were non-families. 39.3% of all households were made up of individuals, 21.2% had someone living alone who was 65 years old or older.

The median age in the city was 60.6 years. 13.2% of the residents were under the age of 20; 4.0% were between the ages of 20 and 24; 14.1% were from 25 and 44; 26.8% were from 45 and 64; and 41.9% were 65 years of age or older. The gender makeup of the city was 47.0% male and 53.0% female.

=== 2010 census ===
As of the census of 2010, there were 807 people, 427 households, and 241 families living in the city. The population density was 436.2 inhabitants per square mile (168.4/km^{2}). There were 1,167 housing units at an average density of 630.8 per square mile (243.6/km^{2}). The racial makeup of the city was 98.8% White, 0.1% African American, 0.1% Asian, 0.5% from other races, and 0.5% from two or more races. Hispanic or Latino of any race were 2.6% of the population.

There were 427 households, of which 14.1% had children under the age of 18 living with them, 48.5% were married couples living together, 5.2% had a female householder with no husband present, 2.8% had a male householder with no wife present, and 43.6% were non-families. 35.6% of all households were made up of individuals, and 16.4% had someone living alone who was 65 years of age or older. The average household size was 1.89 and the average family size was 2.39.

The median age in the city was 55.2 years. 11.8% of residents were under the age of 18; 5.3% were between the ages of 18 and 24; 18.6% were from 25 to 44; 35.3% were from 45 to 64; and 29% were 65 years of age or older. The gender makeup of the city was 48.9% male and 51.1% female.

=== 2000 census ===
As of the census of 2000, there were 820 people, 427 households, and 240 families living in the city. The population density was 460.0 inhabitants per square mile (177.6/km^{2}). There were 944 housing units at an average density of 529.6 per square mile (204.5/km^{2}). The racial makeup of the city was 98.66% White, 0.12% African American, 0.73% Native American, 0.12% from other races, and 0.37% from two or more races. Hispanic or Latino of any race were 0.73% of the population.

There were 427 households, out of which 16.2% had children under the age of 18 living with them, 50.6% were married couples living together, 3.5% had a female householder with no husband present, and 43.6% were non-families. 38.6% of all households were made up of individuals, and 17.1% had someone living alone who was 65 years of age or older. The average household size was 1.92 and the average family size was 2.50.

In the city, the population was spread out, with 14.3% under the age of 18, 7.2% from 18 to 24, 20.9% from 25 to 44, 30.0% from 45 to 64, and 27.7% who were 65 years of age or older. The median age was 49 years. For every 100 females, there were 100.0 males. For every 100 females age 18 and over, there were 100.9 males.

The median income for a household in the city was $37,500, and the median income for a family was $54,659. Males had a median income of $32,500 versus $24,018 for females. The per capita income for the city was $29,297. About 2.6% of families and 5.3% of the population were below the poverty line, including 5.0% of those under age 18 and 3.8% of those age 65 or over.

== Education ==
Most of the community is served by the Okoboji Community School District. The district was established on July 1, 1988, by the merger of the Arnolds Park and Milford school districts. Okoboji High School in Milford is the local high school.

== Tourism ==
Okoboji is a major summer tourism area, known as "the Hamptons of the Midwest". A growing number of resorts around the Iowa Great Lakes and the proximity of other tourist-friendly sites, such as Arnolds Park and Spirit Lake, have contributed to its popularity. Okoboji has also become a recognizable name nationwide due to sales of many products that display the town name in bold letters. Visitors will see bumper stickers, mugs, and sweatshirts touting the fictitious University of Okoboji, which many locals claim to have attended. University of Okoboji T-shirts and sweatshirts are popular with college students in the Midwest.
