= East Okoboji Lake =

Lake in Dickinson County, Iowa, USA

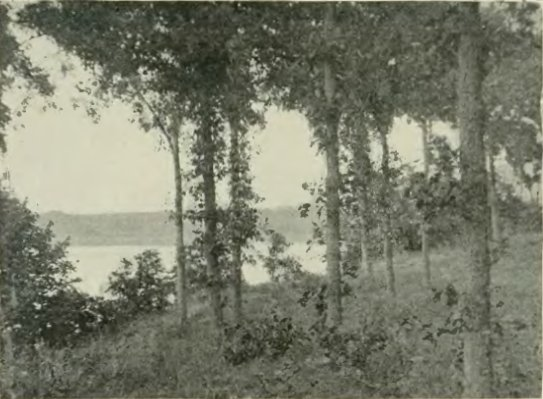
- (1903)

- Location of East Okoboji Lake in Iowa Location of East Okoboji Lake in the United States
- Location: Dickinson County, Iowa
- Coordinates: 43°24′17″N 095°04′31″W
- Basin countries: United States
- Surface area: 1,835 acres (743 ha)
- Average depth: 10 ft (3.0 m)
- Max. depth: 22 ft (6.7 m)
- Surface elevation: 1,398 ft (426 m)
- Settlements: Spirit Lake, Okoboji

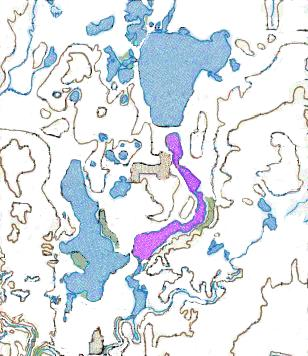
East Okoboji Lake, in the Iowa Great Lakes region.

East Okoboji Lake is a natural body of water, approximately 1,835 acres (7.43 km^{2}) in area, in Dickinson County in northwest Iowa in the United States. It is part of the chain of lakes known as the Iowa Great Lakes. The area was long inhabited by the Santee or Eastern Dakota Sioux. The lake was known after its Dakota-language name, Okoboozhy, meaning reeds and rushes.

== History ==
The towns of Spirit Lake and Okoboji, founded as European-American settlements in the nineteenth century, sit along its western shore. They became notable after the Spirit Lake Massacre of 1857, when a renegade band of Sioux attacked the frontier settlements, in part for food, because they were suffering starvation during a severe winter with heavy snows. It was the last Native American attack in Iowa against settlers.

== Geology ==
Geologically, the lake, like its neighbors, is a glacial pothole, a remnant of the most recent ice age approximately 13,000 years ago.

The lake is shallow, with an average depth of 10 ft (3.0 m) and a maximum depth of 22 ft (6.7 m). During the summer months, it is prone to stratification and to overgrowth with algae.

== Fishing ==
The lake is a popular fishing destination in the region, for both open water and ice fishing. East and West Lake Okoboji have a healthy population of numerous species including: Black Crappie, Bluegill, Channel Catfish, Largemouth Bass, Muskie, Northern Pike, Smallmouth Bass, Walleye, White Bass, Yellow Bass, Yellow Bullhead, and Yellow Perch.

== Media ==
The lake was the main setting of the fourth X-Files episode, "Conduit". However, the episode was filmed in British Columbia, with Buntzen Lake being used as Lake Okoboji. The lake is also depicted as being located in Sioux City in the fictitious Lake Okobogee National Park.

== See also ==
- Big Spirit Lake
- West Okoboji Lake
