= Rathbun Lake =

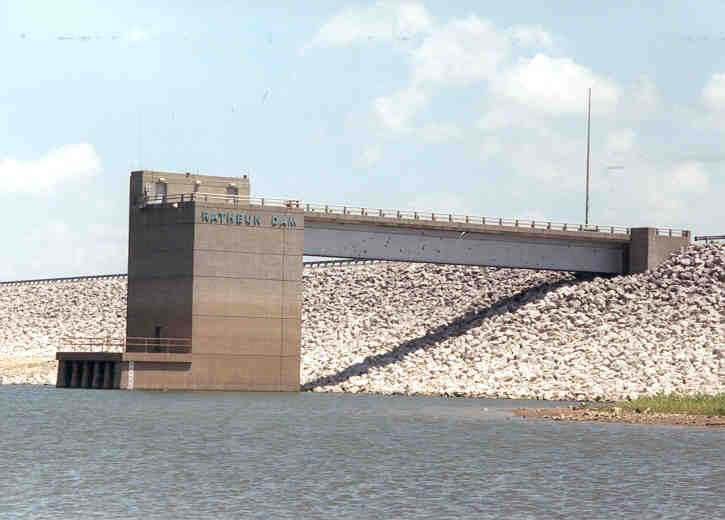
- Rathbun Dam in 2011

- Location within Iowa Location within the United States
- Location: Appanoose County, Iowa
- Coordinates: 40°51′N 92°55′W
- Type: reservoir
- Primary inflows: Chariton River
- Primary outflows: Chariton River
- Catchment area: 549 sq mi (1,422 km^{2})
- Max. length: 21 mi (34 km)
- Surface area: 11,000 acres (44.52 km^{2}) max: 21,000 acres (84.98 km^{2})
- Surface elevation: 904 ft (276 m)

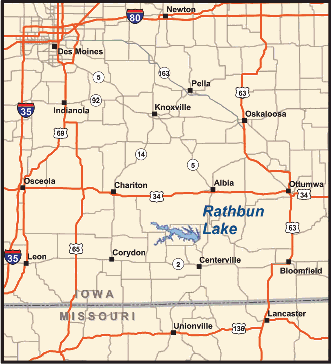
Rathbun Lake is located in southern Iowa

Rathbun Lake was constructed and is operated by the U.S. Army Corps of Engineers. Located at Chariton River mile marker 142, approximately 7 miles (11 km) north of Centerville, Iowa, in Appanoose County, it is one of the largest lakes in Iowa. The lake was constructed to control flooding, provide recreation opportunities, abate stream pollution, fish and wildlife enhancement, and maintain minimum stream flow on the Chariton, Missouri, and Mississippi Rivers. The Chariton and South Fork of the Chariton River are the major sources of water flowing into Rathbun Lake.

The construction of Rathbun Dam and Reservoir was authorized by the Flood Control Act of 1954 (Public Law 83-780). Construction of the dam and embankment began in September 1964. Most of the remains of the village of Griffinsville are underneath the lake. The dam itself is rolled earthfill construction and is 10,129 feet (3,087 m) long, 30 feet (9.1 m) wide at the top, and rises 100 feet (30 m) above the streambed. Operation as a multi-purpose unit began November 1969 and the top of multi-purpose pool (904 ft (276 m) msl) was reached on October 10, 1970. Rathbun Lake was dedicated July 31, 1971, with President Richard Nixon being the keynote speaker.

Camping, sightseeing, fishing, boating, picnicking and hunting are favorite activities on and near Rathbun Lake. The lake’s fish and wildlife resources provide sightseers, fishermen and hunters ample opportunities for their sports. Bald eagles, white-tailed deer, Canada geese, wild turkey, crappie, walleye, channel catfish and other wildlife can be found at Rathbun Lake. The size of the lake combined with the prevailing winds make Rathbun Lake one of the best sailing lakes in Iowa. One marina concession area, Rathbun Lake Marina (near the dam), provides a full line of marina services. Rathbun Lake is home to the Rathbun Yacht Club.

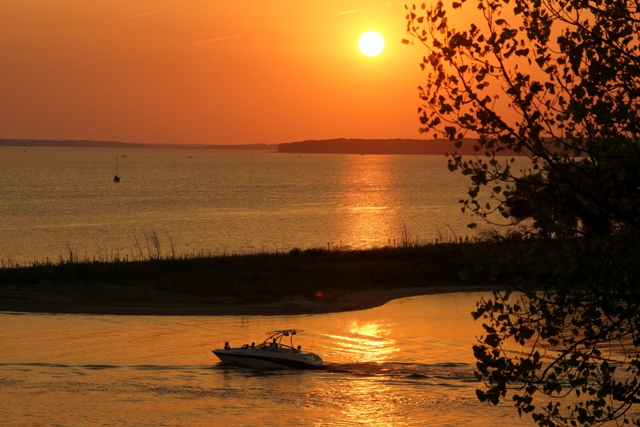
Boaters enjoying a sunset cruise on Rathbun Lake.

Eight parks have been developed for public recreation. Six are managed by the Corps of Engineers, and one state park is managed by the Iowa Department of Natural Resources. Recreation facilities include boat ramps, courtesy docks, campgrounds, picnic areas and playgrounds. Honey Creek State Park Resort opened in 2008 and is Iowa's first-ever state-run resort with more than a hundred guest rooms, an 18-hole golf course, and an indoor water park.

Rathbun Lake supplies the water treatment plant of Rathbun Regional Water Association (RRWA) which provides water to nearly 16,000 rural families, farms and communities in Iowa and Missouri. Average production at the plant during 2001 was 4.37 million US gallons (16.5 Ml) per day; however, the annual usage of the RRWA water system is equal to only 4 inches of Rathbun Lake water surface.

== Sources ==
- U.S. Army Corps of Engineers: Rathbun Lake – Dam and River Basin
- U.S. Army Corps of Engineers: Rathbun Lake – Lake Facts
- U.S. Army Corps of Engineers: Rathbun Lake – Recreation Opportunities
- Midwest Sailing
- Rathbun Yacht Club
- Iowa Department of Natural Resources
- KCRG-TV News – Honey Creek State Park Resort Open for Business
- Honey Creek Resort State Park
- Rathbun Regional Water Association
