= Union Grove State Park (Iowa) =

State park in Tama County, Iowa

Union Grove Park
- Location within Iowa Location within the United States
- Location: Tama County, Iowa, United States
- Nearest city: Gladbrook, Iowa
- Coordinates: 42°07′44″N 92°43′29″W
- Area: 282 acres (114 ha)
- Elevation: 942 ft (287 m)
- Established: 1938
- Administrator: Iowa Department of Natural Resources
- Website: Official website

Union Grove State Park is a 282-acre (114 ha) state park in Tama County, Iowa, United States, near the city of Gladbrook. The park, which was opened in 1938, is home to the 110-acre (45 ha) Union Grove Lake along with a dam and a waterfall.

The lake features two boat ramps, a beach, and 24-hour fishing sites. Fish living in the lake include bluegill, channel catfish, crappie, largemouth bass, and walleye. The park also includes 3 miles (4.8 km) of hiking trails, a campground, and two cabins. Animals that can be seen within the park include deer, turkeys, and various songbirds.
