= Orleans, Iowa =

- City
- Location of Orleans, Iowa
- Coordinates: 43°27′25″N 95°06′48″W
- Country: USA
- State: Iowa
- County: Dickinson

Area
  - Total: 1.13 sq mi (2.92 km^{2})
  - Land: 1.13 sq mi (2.92 km^{2})
  - Water: 0 sq mi (0.00 km^{2})
- Elevation: 1,401 ft (427 m)

Population (2020)
  - Total: 521
  - Density: 462.4/sq mi (178.55/km^{2})
- Time zone: UTC-6 (Central (CST))
  - Summer (DST): UTC-5 (CDT)
- ZIP code: 51360
- Area code: 712
- FIPS code: 19-59655
- GNIS feature ID: 2396079
- Website: https://orleansiowa.gov

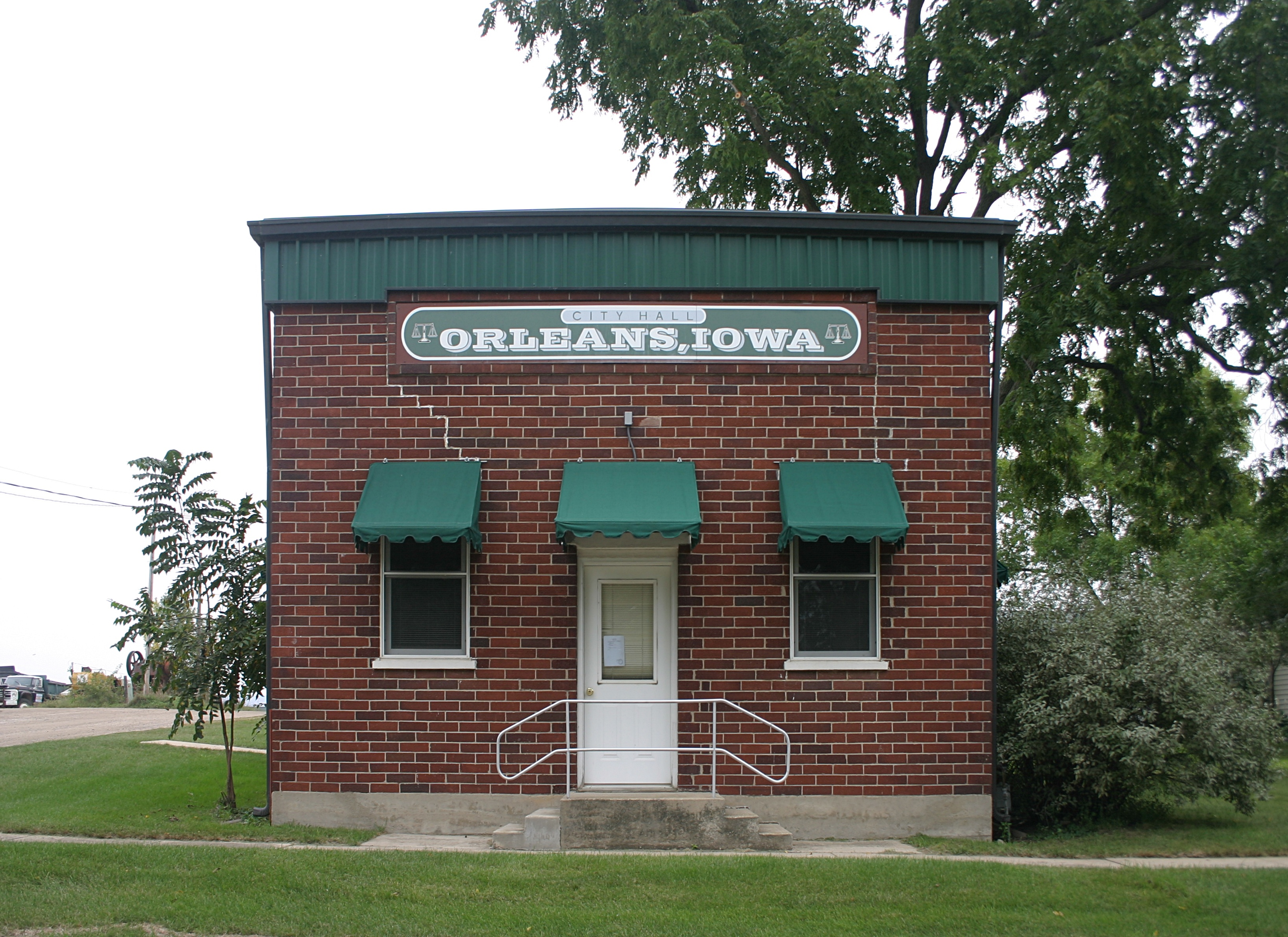
City hall

Orleans is a city in Dickinson County, Iowa, United States. The population was 521 at the time of the 2020 census. Orleans is part of the Iowa Great Lakes region, located along Spirit Lake. Numerous state parks are located within a few miles of the town, including Marble Beach and Mini-Wakan.

== Geography ==
According to the United States Census Bureau, the city has a total area of 1.09 square miles (2.82 km^{2}), of which 1.08 square miles (2.80 km^{2}) is land and 0.01 square miles (0.03 km^{2}) is water.

== Demographics ==
Historical populations
| Year | Pop. | ±% |
|---|---|---|
| 1900 | 92 | — |
| 1910 | 105 | +14.1% |
| 1920 | 123 | +17.1% |
| 1930 | 126 | +2.4% |
| 1940 | 244 | +93.7% |
| 1950 | 317 | +29.9% |
| 1960 | 280 | −11.7% |
| 1970 | 396 | +41.4% |
| 1980 | 546 | +37.9% |
| 1990 | 560 | +2.6% |
| 2000 | 583 | +4.1% |
| 2010 | 608 | +4.3% |
| 2020 | 521 | −14.3% |
Source:"U.S. Census website". United States Census Bureau. and Iowa Data Center; Source: U.S. Decennial Census

=== 2020 census ===
As of the census of 2020, there were 521 people, 246 households, and 175 families residing in the city. The population density was 462.4 inhabitants per square mile (178.5/km^{2}). There were 544 housing units at an average density of 482.9 per square mile (186.4/km^{2}). The racial makeup of the city was 93.1% White, 0.2% Black or African American, 0.0% Native American, 1.0% Asian, 0.0% Pacific Islander, 0.6% from other races and 5.2% from two or more races. Hispanic or Latino persons of any race comprised 1.0% of the population.

Of the 246 households, 16.3% of which had children under the age of 18 living with them, 61.0% were married couples living together, 4.5% were cohabitating couples, 21.1% had a female householder with no spouse or partner present and 13.4% had a male householder with no spouse or partner present. 28.9% of all households were non-families. 25.2% of all households were made up of individuals, 14.6% had someone living alone who was 65 years old or older.

The median age in the city was 61.8 years. 13.1% of the residents were under the age of 20; 4.4% were between the ages of 20 and 24; 11.5% were from 25 and 44; 27.6% were from 45 and 64; and 43.4% were 65 years of age or older. The gender makeup of the city was 49.9% male and 50.1% female.

=== 2010 census ===
As of the census of 2010, there were 608 people, 292 households, and 211 families living in the city. The population density was 563.0 inhabitants per square mile (217.4/km^{2}). There were 558 housing units at an average density of 516.7 per square mile (199.5/km^{2}). The racial makeup of the city was 99.0% White, 0.2% African American, 0.5% Asian, 0.2% from other races, and 0.2% from two or more races. Hispanic or Latino of any race were 0.3% of the population.

There were 292 households, of which 14.4% had children under the age of 18 living with them, 67.8% were married couples living together, 2.4% had a female householder with no husband present, 2.1% had a male householder with no wife present, and 27.7% were non-families. 25.7% of all households were made up of individuals, and 13.3% had someone living alone who was 65 years of age or older. The average household size was 2.08 and the average family size was 2.43.

The median age in the city was 58.5 years. 13.2% of residents were under the age of 18; 1.6% were between the ages of 18 and 24; 13.3% were from 25 to 44; 39% were from 45 to 64; and 32.9% were 65 years of age or older. The gender makeup of the city was 48.0% male and 52.0% female.

=== 2000 census ===
As of the census of 2000, there were 583 people, 274 households, and 197 families living in the city. The population density was 582.2 inhabitants per square mile (224.8/km^{2}). There were 509 housing units at an average density of 508.3 per square mile (196.3/km^{2}). The racial makeup of the city was 99.14% White and 0.86% Asian.

There were 274 households, out of which 17.9% had children under the age of 18 living with them, 63.1% were married couples living together, 6.9% had a female householder with no husband present, and 28.1% were non-families. 25.2% of all households were made up of individuals, and 16.1% had someone living alone who was 65 years of age or older. The average household size was 2.13 and the average family size was 2.48.

In the city, the population was spread out, with 14.6% under the age of 18, 5.5% from 18 to 24, 14.9% from 25 to 44, 31.4% from 45 to 64, and 33.6% who were 65 years of age or older. The median age was 53 years. For every 100 females, there were 97.0 males. For every 100 females age 18 and over, there were 93.0 males.

The median income for a household in the city was $41,818, and the median income for a family was $57,000. Males had a median income of $36,786 versus $27,750 for females. The per capita income for the city was $28,451. About 6.0% of families and 9.2% of the population were below the poverty line, including 15.9% of those under age 18 and 4.2% of those age 65 or over.

== Education ==
The Spirit Lake Community School District operates local area public schools.
