= Spirit Lake Massacre =

1857 attack by Sioux on settlers in Spirit Lake, Iowa

Coordinates: 43.42°N 95.10°W

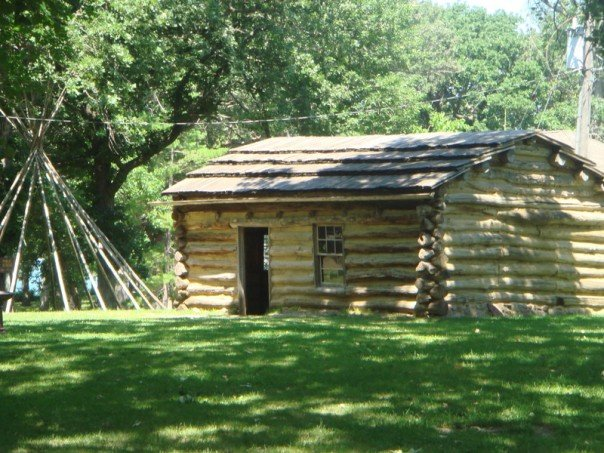
Abbie Gardner's Cabin

The Spirit Lake Massacre (March 8–12, 1857) was an attack by a Wahpekute band of Santee Sioux on scattered Iowa frontier settlements during a severe winter. Suffering a shortage of food, the renegade chief Inkpaduta (Scarlet Point) led 14 Sioux against the settlements near Okoboji and Spirit lakes in Northwestern Iowa near the Minnesota border, in revenge of the murder of Inkpaduta's brother, Sidominadotah, and Sidominadotah's family by Henry Lott, a drunken white whiskey trader. The Sioux killed 35-40 settlers in their scattered holdings, took four young women captive, and headed north. The youngest captive, Abbie Gardner, was kept a few months before being ransomed in early summer. It was the last Native American attack on settlers in Iowa, but the events increased tensions between the Sioux and settlers in the Minnesota Territory. Nearly 30 years after the events, in 1885 Abbie Gardner-Sharp published her memoir, History of the Spirit Lake Massacre and Captivity of Miss Abbie Gardner, which was reprinted seven times in small editions. It was one of the last captivity narratives written of European Americans' being held by Native Americans. In 1891, Gardner-Sharp purchased the primitive family cabin and returned home. For the last 30 years of her life, she subsisted on the modest earnings from her book and souvenir sales. The town erected a historical monument to commemorate the attack. The State of Iowa now maintains the park and Abbie Gardner Sharp home site.

== Background ==
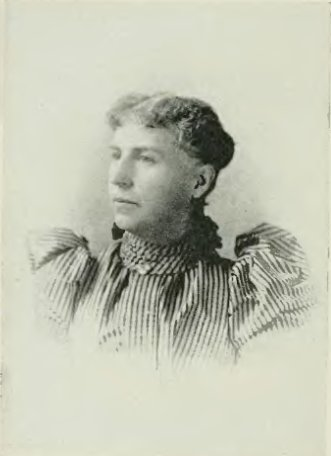
Abbie Gardner Sharp, photographed decades after the massacre

Inkpaduta led a small band of Wahpekutes who had been expelled from the main band in dissension following the murder of a chief in 1840. (Other major bands of Sioux in the region were the Wahpeton and Sisseton.) Including some women and children, his band followed the game and lived by hunting, whose yield was decreasing under pressure of new settlement. They also received some annuities under the Traverse des Sioux and Mendota 1851 treaties but never received the rightful amount owed by the United States for lands the Sioux were forced to cede.

By the terms of the Traverse des Sioux treaty, a reservation was set up along the Minnesota River, about 15 miles above Fort Ridgely. Promised improvements were not made on time and the federal government repeatedly failed to make adequate and timely annuity payments, even failing to authorize adequate budgets for the Department of Interior for this purpose. Provisions for education were not started for several years; only a few missionaries taught the Sioux bands. Lands were not adequately plowed for cultivation. Supplies were shipped too late and in inadequate amounts, to the point where the Sioux could not survive on them. By 1856, many Mdewakantons and Wahpekutes still came to the reservation just to get annuity payments, and returned to old hunting grounds to survive, especially during the winter. As they encountered more new settlers, conflicts arose. In a reorganization, in the summer of 1856 Charles A. Flandrau was appointed US Indian agent. Said to be an experienced trader and a man of integrity, he worked at improving conditions, but had much ground to make up. Many Sioux in addition to Inkpaduta's band were living off the reservation because of the government's failures.

Suffering food shortages during the severe winter of 1856–1857, which saw heavy snows, Inkpaduta and his band begged for food at European-American settlements in northwestern Iowa. Also struggling that winter, whites rebuffed the Indians with violence and a posse disarmed Inkpaduta's band after they killed a settler's dog that had bitten one of the band. They managed to acquire arms and retaliated by attacking settlements there and at Spirit Lake.

In another account, the tribe was camped near current day Smithland, Iowa. Native people were sometimes beaten and chased for stealing livestock and scavenging grain in harvested fields; thus, weary of the group, who in turn "borrowed" community items freely if they could, a vigilante group from Smithland went out to their encampment. The group, including John Howe, Eli Floyd and Jonathan Leach, appropriated guns and told the tribe they would be back in the morning. The Indians broke camp that night.

Defenseless and hungry, the band moved north. Perhaps the first raid came near Gillet Grove, Iowa. A warrior of the group, who approached the Gillett cabin, was allegedly shot after repeated visits to the cabin believed to fancy Mrs. Gillett while also looking for food and rifles. As the tribe destroyed homes and lives on their journey, they came across Jowl Howe, who was also decapitated. The warriors killed 35-40 settlers, regardless of age or gender. Most of the victims were scalped. The Sioux took four young women as captives, 14-year-old Abbie Gardner and three who were married, and headed back to Minnesota territory. Word spread about the attacks, and the U.S. Indian Agent organized an armed militia of white citizens. Because of the heavy snows, a relief expedition from Fort Dodge failed to arrive in time. Another expedition from Fort Ridgely in Minnesota pursued Inkpaduta and his band but failed to catch them. Abbie states in her memories that Lt. Murray and his men were within eyesight the second day after the Springfield, Minnesota, raid, but were unaware of how close they came to encountering the Sioux.

While settlers demanded vengeance and rumors proliferated, the territorial authorities decided not to act against the Sioux until the captives had been returned. Settlers killed innocent Sioux who were caught hunting near them. When contact was made with Inkpaduta's group, the officials found that two of the captive women had been killed. In May the territorial legislature authorized a ransom, and a few days later two Wahpeton men brought in the third matron, Mrs. Margaret Ann Marble, for ransom. By the summer, Gov. Samuel Medary of the Minnesota Territory and the Indian agent at Lac qui Parle , completed negotiations for the ransom of Abbie Gardner, who was taken by two Sisseton to the Upper Sioux Agency on the Minnesota River. From there she was taken to Fort Ridgely and then to St. Paul, Minnesota. During the summer, after struggling to marshal troops and attract allied Sioux warriors, the Indian Agency pursued Inkpaduta and his band, but most evaded capture. The Sioux refused to join another expedition.

== Aftermath ==
This was the last attack of Native Americans against settlers in Iowa. Historians have considered it a foreshadowing of the Sioux uprising in Minnesota in 1862 . The events worsened relations between the Sioux and settlers in the territory, with mistrust and fear higher on both sides. Whites reacted by attacking some innocent Sioux who were hunting near settlements. Because of competition over the lands, white settlers feared that the remaining free Indians would attack them, so they called for their removal by the US government. The Sioux resented the failure of the government to fulfill treaty obligations; they were starving due to inadequate rations and annuities at the reservations. By 1862, seeing thousands of children and elders die from starvation while whites broke the laws by seizing prime Sioux lands, the Sioux rebelled in what historians called the Sioux "Uprising."

Nearly 30 years later in 1885, Abbie Gardner-Sharp, by then married, published her short memoir of the 1856 attack and her captivity, entitled History of the Spirit Lake Massacre and Captivity of Miss Abbie Gardner. Perhaps because the Indian Wars were over, the book was very popular and had several editions; it was reprinted in 1892 and 1910. This was one of the last works in the United States in the literary genre known as captivity narratives, dealing with the holding of European Americans by Native Americans.

After years of marriage and living elsewhere, Gardner-Sharp returned to Spirit Lake in 1891 and bought her former family cabin. She operated it as a tourist site until her death in 1921, and sold her book, postcards and souvenirs there. In 1895 the state erected a memorial monument to the settlers at Arnolds Park near the site.

The area of the Spirit Lake settlement was later redeveloped as Camp Foster, a YMCA youth summer camp, where legends and ghost stories related to the events are recounted.

== Abbie Gardner Sharp Cabin ==
The Abbie Gardner Sharp Cabin, also known as the Spirit Lake Massacre Log Cabin, where Gardner lived as a girl and which she later ran as a tourist attraction, still stands at Arnolds Park, Iowa. The state Conservation Commission purchased the cabin in 1941 and transferred it to the State Historical Society of Iowa in 1974. Under the guidance of architects and archeologists, it has been restored to its 1856 appearance. The park's visitor center features artifacts relating to the period, and to the cultures of both the Sioux and the European-American settlers.

== Fiction and film ==
- The silent film With Sitting Bull at the Spirit Lake Massacre (1927) was loosely based on these events; in fact, Sitting Bull had nothing to do with the attacks.
- MacKinlay Kantor based his novel Spirit Lake (1961) on the historic events.

== See also ==
- List of massacres in the United States
