= West Okoboji Lake =

Lake in Dickinson County, Iowa, USA

West Lake Okoboji
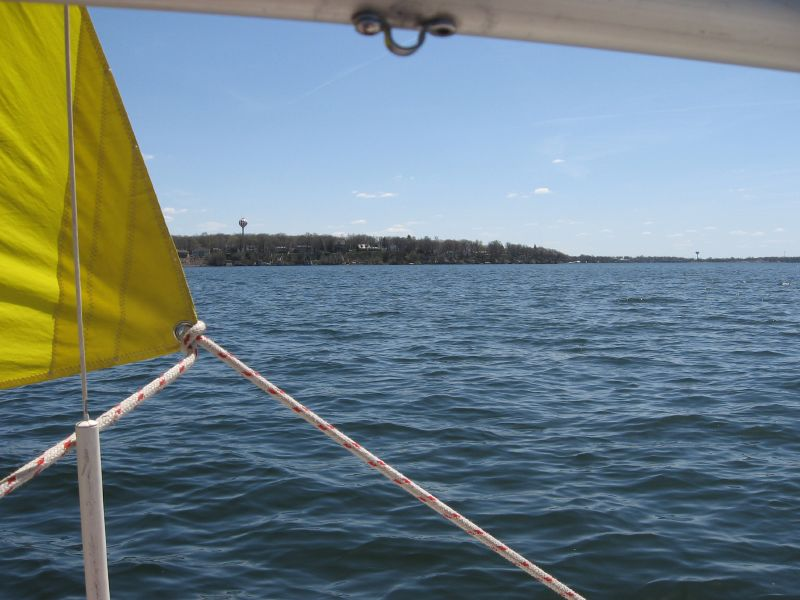

- Location within Iowa Location within the United States
- Location: Dickinson County, Iowa
- Coordinates: 43°23′04″N 095°09′34″W
- Catchment area: 125 sq mi (320 km^{2})
- Basin countries: United States
- Surface area: 3,847 acres (1,557 ha)
- Average depth: 39 ft (12 m)
- Max. depth: 154 ft (47 m)
- Surface elevation: 1,398 ft (426 m)
- Islands: 0
- Settlements: Arnolds Park; Okoboji; Wahpeton; West Okoboji

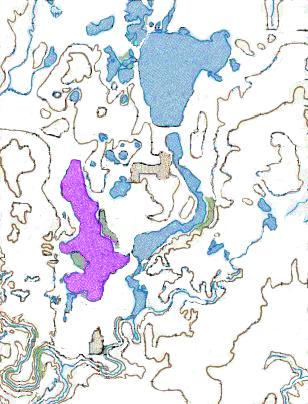
West Okoboji Lake (highlighted in purple), in the Iowa Great Lakes region.

West Okoboji Lake (sometimes known as West Lake Okoboji) is a natural body of water, approximately 3,847 acres (15.57 km^{2}) in area, in Dickinson County in northwestern Iowa in the United States. It is part of the chain of lakes known as the Iowa Great Lakes. The area was long inhabited by the Santee or Dakota Sioux. The Dakota-language name for the lake was Minnetonka, meaning "great waters".

The cities of Arnolds Park, Okoboji, West Okoboji, and Wahpeton sit on its shore. Okoboji was derived from the Dakota name for the lake, and Wahpeton was the name of one of the major historic Sioux bands in the nineteenth century. Today the Sisseton-Wahpeton Sioux are a federally recognized tribe.

The lake has exceptional water quality and color, and is included on the DNR’s Outstanding Iowa Waters list. The lake has long been noted for its blue waters, with an author drawing comparison to "Guarda(sic) or Lake of Zürich" in the 1895 Midland Monthly Magazine. The statement that West Okoboji is "one of only three blue water lakes in the world" is a long-repeated myth, which has been refuted. The statement has appeared in numerous tour guides since the early 20th century. In an article in the National Geographic May 1981 edition from staff writer Harvey Arden, the Okoboji and Spirit lakes were called "blue - water" lakes.

== Geography ==
The lake's maximum depth is 136 feet (41 m), making it the deepest lake in Iowa. The mean depth is 39 feet (12 m). The drainage area of the lake is approximately 125 square miles (320 km^{2}).

== Recreation ==
The depth of the lake makes it a popular regional destination for motor boating, water skiing, sailing, and swimming. The lake is also a popular fishing destination in the region. The main catches in the lake are yellow perch, bluegill, and walleye. It also contains significant populations of smallmouth bass, northern pike, muskie, crappie and white bass, black bass.

== See also ==
- Big Spirit Lake
- East Okoboji Lake
