= Clear Lake (Iowa) =

Lake in Iowa, United States

- Location within Iowa Location within the United States
- Location: Cerro Gordo County, Iowa
- Coordinates: 43°07′32″N 93°25′29″W
- Basin countries: United States
- Surface area: 3,684 acres (15 km^{2})
- Average depth: 12 ft (3.7 m)
- Max. depth: 30 ft (9.1 m)
- Shore length^{1}: 27.6 mi (44.4 km)
- Surface elevation: 1,227 ft (374 m)
- ^{1} Shore length is not a well-defined measure.

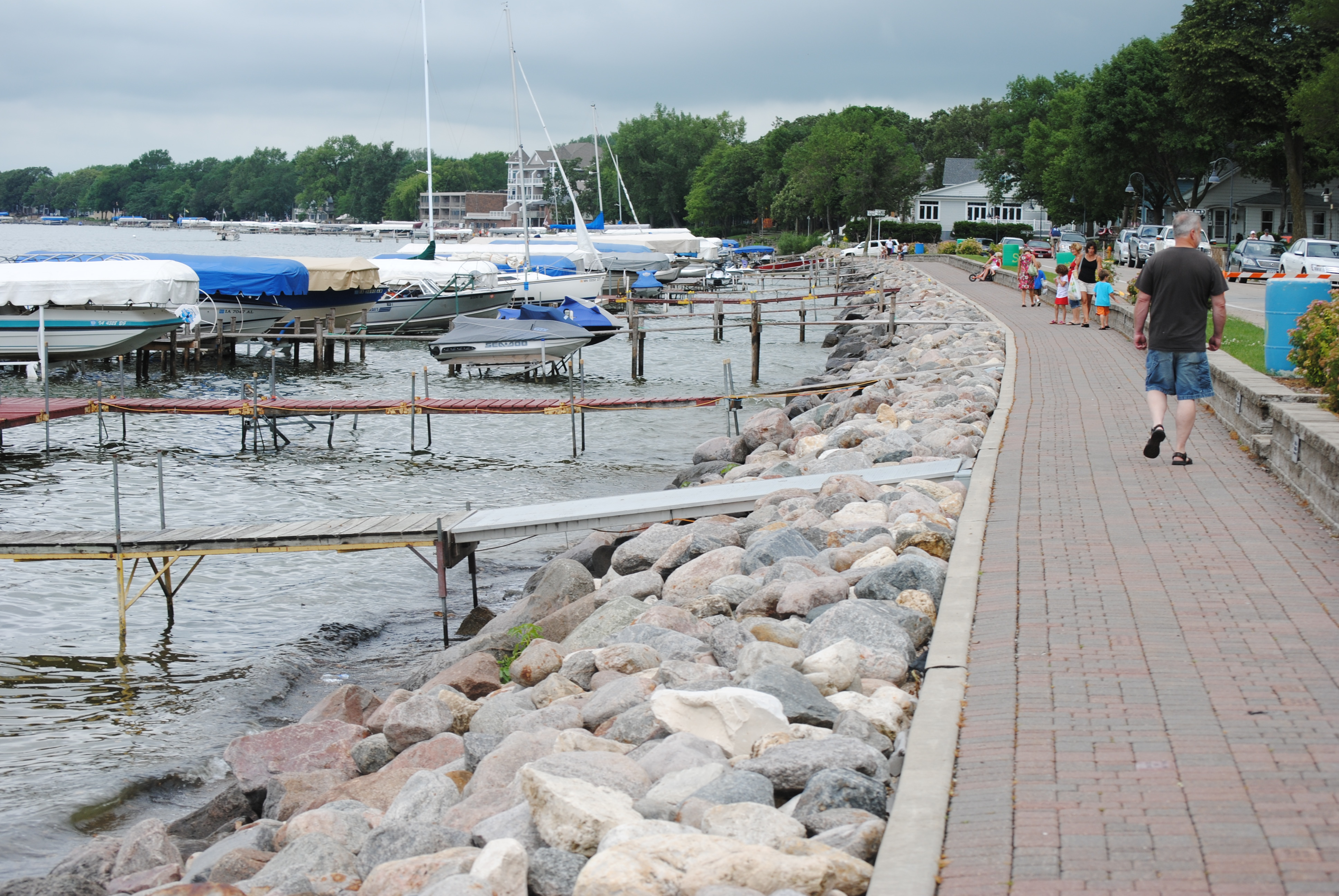
Waterfront walkway in Clear Lake

Clear Lake is a natural spring fed body of water located in Cerro Gordo County, Iowa, near Clear Lake, Iowa. It is approximately 3,684 acres (15 km^{2}) in size. It is a popular fishing destination, with walleye, yellow bass and channel catfish.

People from Des Moines and Minneapolis–Saint Paul have had homes on the shores of the lake since the 1870s. The average depth is 10 feet (3 m) and the maximum depth is 30 feet (9 m), in the dredged area of the west end. The lake has 13.6 mi (22 km) of shoreline. As of 2004, the lake has seen major efforts undergone to restore its natural clarity, including filtration systems, dredging, and education of local farmers to reduce toxic pesticides from entering the lake. Clear Lake has been named the "Best Iowa Lake Town" by The Des Moines Register and "A Top Vacation Spot" by Midwest Living magazine.

== Boating ==
Clear Lake is home to the Clear Lake Yacht Club, a sailing club in downtown Clear Lake, Iowa. Many members race and equally informally cruise the lake. Each weekend between Memorial Day and Labor Day, the course is set on the main basin of the lake and boats can be seen racing for miles. Another sailing main stay is the Cougar Bay beach. The 250-foot (76 m) beach was home to 60 to 100 Catamaran sailboats during the summer months. Clear Lake is the highest point in Cerro Gordo County, making wind always common on the water, and therefore a sailor's paradise. The Lady of the Lake is a steamboat-like cruising boat that often cruises all over the lake. Water skiing, wake boarding, tubing, and many other behind boat sports are common on the lake.

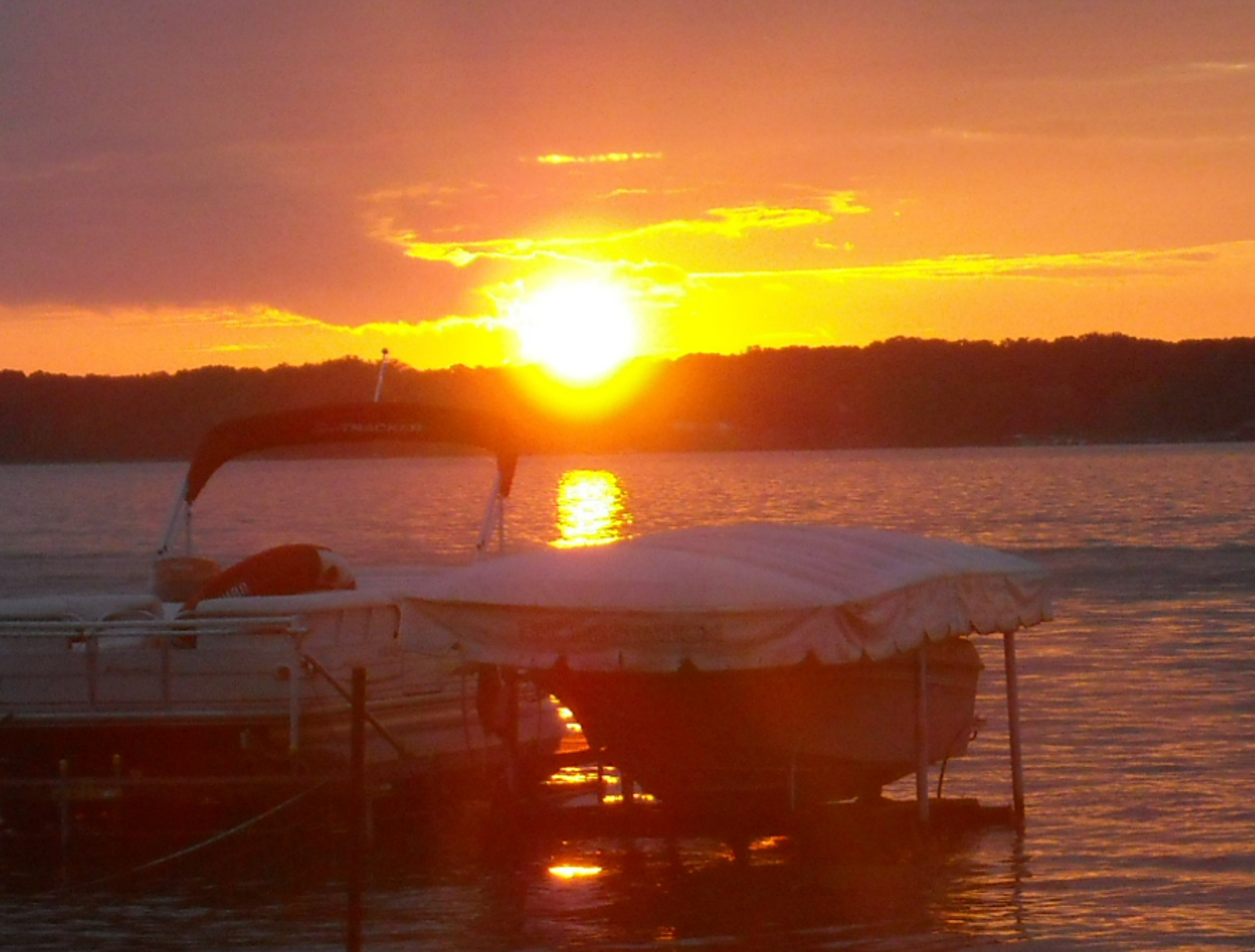
A summer sunset, taken from Buzzards Bay

== Notable places ==
Clear Lake is dotted with several different landmarks for orientation on the water. Woodford Island is often visible from every point on the lake, making it a navigational aid. A hotel was located on the island until a fire leveled it in the 1930s. Now the island is mostly made up of trees and many other plants. Lone Tree Point, Farmers Beach, and Mcintosh Woods are also very natural, with many trees and beaches and few buildings. Notable lakeside communities include the city of Clear Lake, the smaller city of Ventura, Bayside, Dodges Point, Buzzards Bay, Tanglefoot, and Bell Harbor. The city of Clear Lake is at the eastern side of the lake and is home to many of the lake's attractions including many restaurants, parks, city services, etc. The small town of Ventura sits on the northwestern basin of the lake. It is at the farthest part of the lake from the city of Clear Lake. Bayside is located on a peninsula south of Woodford Island. It used to be home to an amusement park but is now a neighborhood. Dodges Point is another peninsula on the south shore. It has houses on the lakeside and the middle is mostly made up of grass and trees. Buzzards Bay is a bay area set between Dodges Point and Tanglefoot. Most of the bay has a sidewalk running on the lakeside of each house. Tanglefoot is a neighborhood to the west of Buzzards Bay and Dodges Point. It is home to a Girl Scout camp and many houses. The western part is bordered by a large wooded area that connects to Farmers Beach and Lone Tree Point. Bell Harbor is a community located in between Bayside and Dodges Point and is home to a large lawn on the lakeside surrounded by condos and houses. Two other notable communities on the waterfront include The Venetian Village and The Harborage. Both of these sit on man made canals and harbors on the northern shore of the lake. Clear Lake is also home to the historic Surf Ballroom which was where Buddy Holly, The Big Bopper, and Ritchie Valens made their last performance on February 3, 1959, before being killed hours later in a plane crash. Often February 3, 1959, is referred to as "The Day the Music Died" as highlighted in the Don McLean hit song "American Pie."

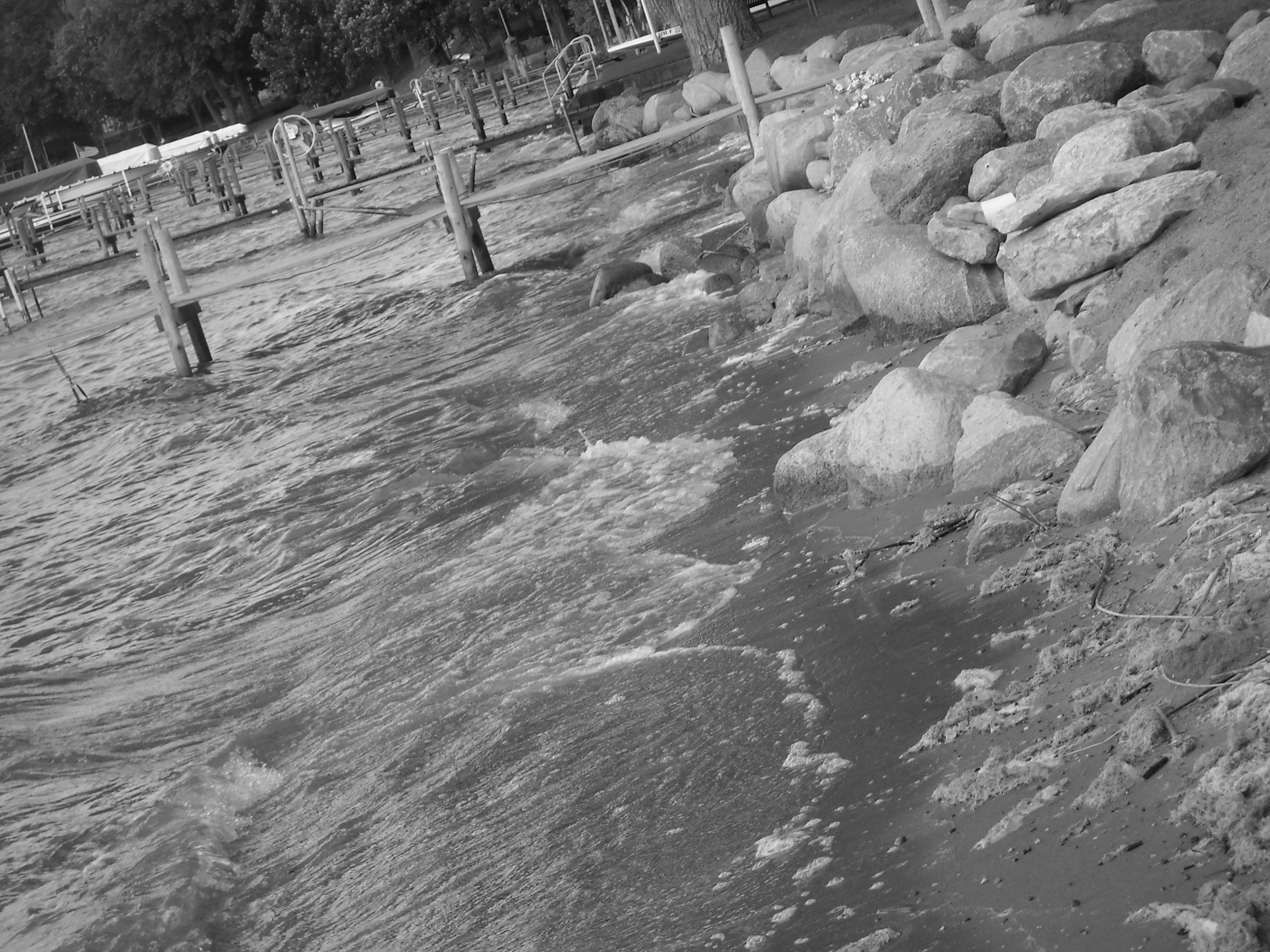
A beach with sand and boulders
