= Big Spirit Lake =

Lake in Iowa, United States

Spirit Lake
- Location within Iowa Location within the United States
- Location: Dickinson County, Iowa
- Coordinates: 43°28′26″N 95°06′06″W
- Basin countries: United States
- Surface area: 5,684 acres (2,300 ha)
- Average depth: 17 ft (5.2 m)
- Max. depth: 24 ft (7.3 m)
- Surface elevation: 1,404 ft (428 m)

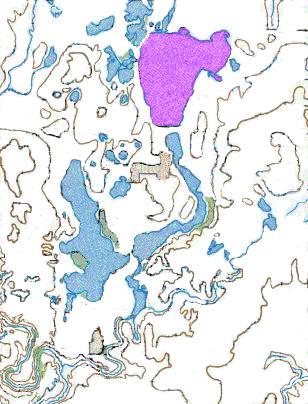
Spirit Lake, in the Iowa Great Lakes region.

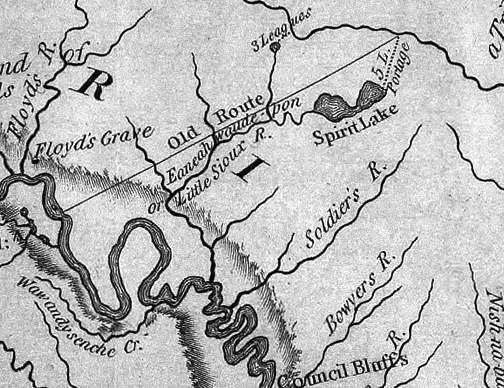
This excerpt from the Lewis and Clark map of 1814 shows western Iowa. Spirit Lake is near the upper center of the map.

Big Spirit Lake is a natural body of water, approximately 5,684 acres (2,300 ha) in area, in Dickinson County in northwest Iowa in the United States. It is part of the chain of lakes known as the Iowa Great Lakes, the northern shore of the lake straddles the border with Minnesota. It is the largest natural lake in Iowa. The Dakota name for the lake was Minnewaukon. Early French traders named it Lac d'Esprit after the Native legends of an evil spirit who dwelled in the lake.

Its maximum depth is 24 feet (7.3 m), and the mean depth is 17 feet (5 m). The drainage area of the lake is approximately 22 square miles (57 km²). It has a drainage area of approximately 75 mi² (194 km²), most of which is in Minnesota.

== Geology ==
Geologically, the lake, like its neighbors, is a glacial pothole, a remnant of the most recent ice age approximately 13,000 years ago.

== Recreation ==
The lake is a popular fishing destination in the region. It contains over 40 species of fish, 13 of which are typically caught. Fishing for walleye and yellow perch is typically done by boat or through the ice. Fishing for bullhead is common from the shore during the spring. A state-operated fish hatchery also provides significant populations of largemouth bass, smallmouth bass, northern pike, muskie, crappie, and bluegill.

The Iowa all-time big fish records for freshwater drum and muskellunge were set from catches in the lake.

Kiteboarding is also a popular activity on Big Spirit Lake.

== See also ==
- East Okoboji Lake
- West Okoboji Lake
