= Spirit Lake, Iowa =

- City
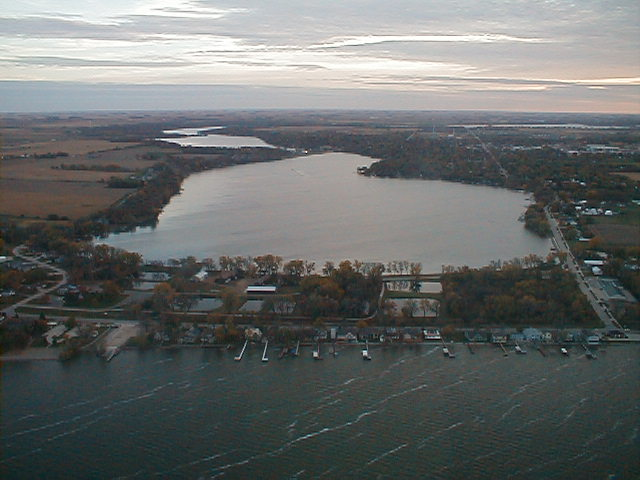
- Spirit Lake, Iowa

- Location of Spirit Lake, Iowa

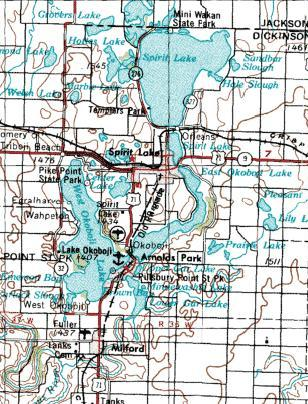
- The town of Spirit Lake, in the Iowa Great Lakes region. Map courtesy of USGS
- Coordinates: 43°25′14″N 95°07′28″W
- Country: United States
- State: Iowa
- County: Dickinson County
- Incorporated: October 14, 1878

Area
  - Total: 4.50 sq mi (11.65 km^{2})
  - Land: 4.48 sq mi (11.60 km^{2})
  - Water: 0.019 sq mi (0.05 km^{2})
- Elevation: 1,480 ft (450 m)

Population (2020)
  - Total: 5,439
  - Density: 1,214.6/sq mi (468.97/km^{2})
- Time zone: UTC-6 (Central (CST))
  - Summer (DST): UTC-5 (CDT)
- ZIP code: 51360
- Area code: 712
- FIPS code: 19-74415
- GNIS feature ID: 2395928
- Website: www.cityofspiritlake.org

Spirit Lake is a city in Dickinson County, Iowa, United States. The population was 5,439 at the 2020 census. It is the county seat of Dickinson County.

The town is located along the western shore of East Okoboji Lake, in the Iowa Great Lakes region.

== History ==
The Dakota Sioux originated the name of "Spirit Lake" referring to it as "The Lake of The Spirit." In 1856, three brothers-in-law created the town of Spirit Lake after a visit to the Lakes area piqued their interest. The three brothers-in-law, O.C. Howe, B.F. Parmenter, and R.U. Wheelock, were soon joined by various other settlers, making homes along the lakes' shores. These settlers however, did not get along peacefully with the natives, and on March 13, 1857 Chief Inkpaduta of the Sioux led a revolt against the non-native settlers, killing all but four women.

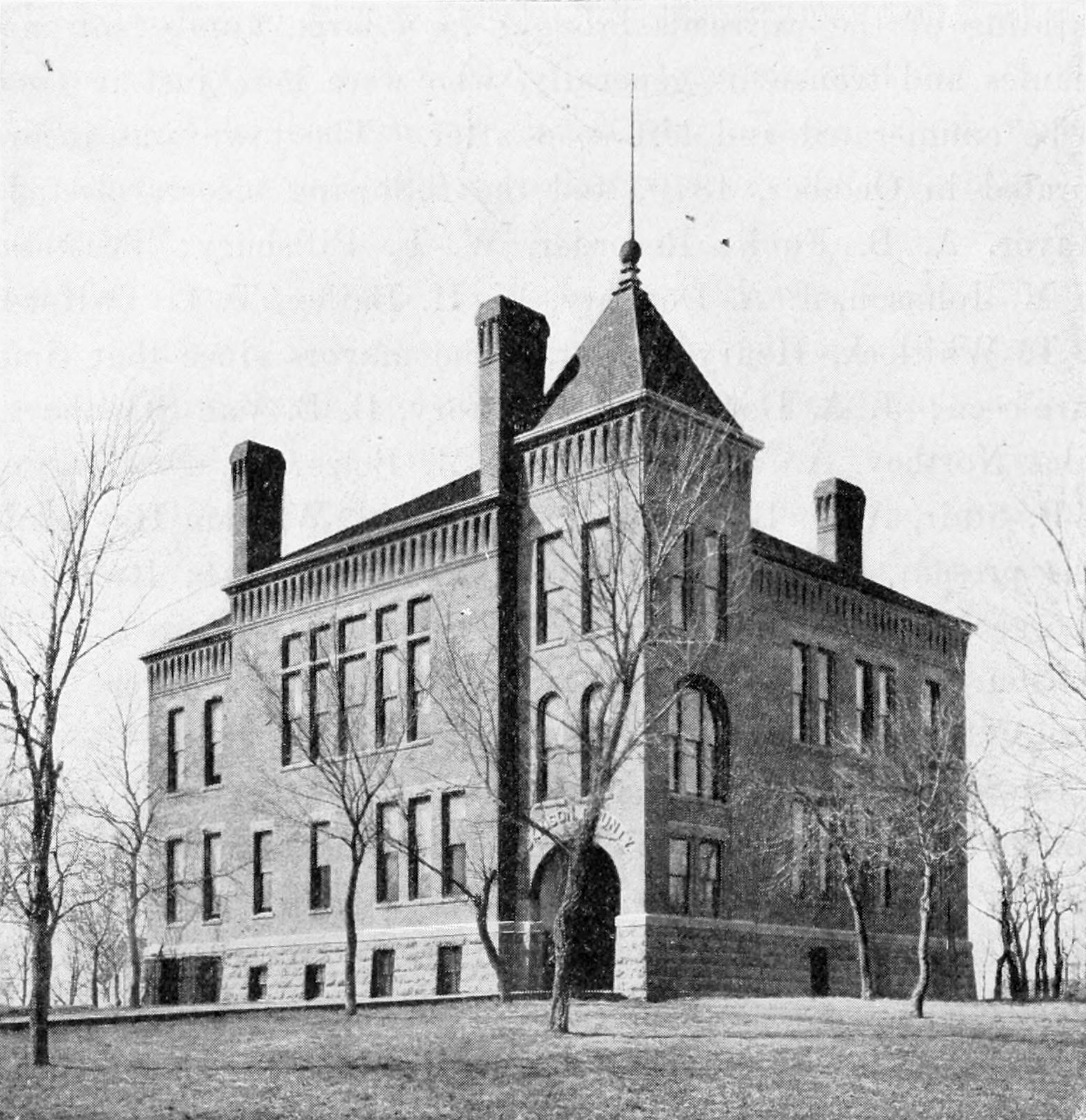
Courthouse, 1902

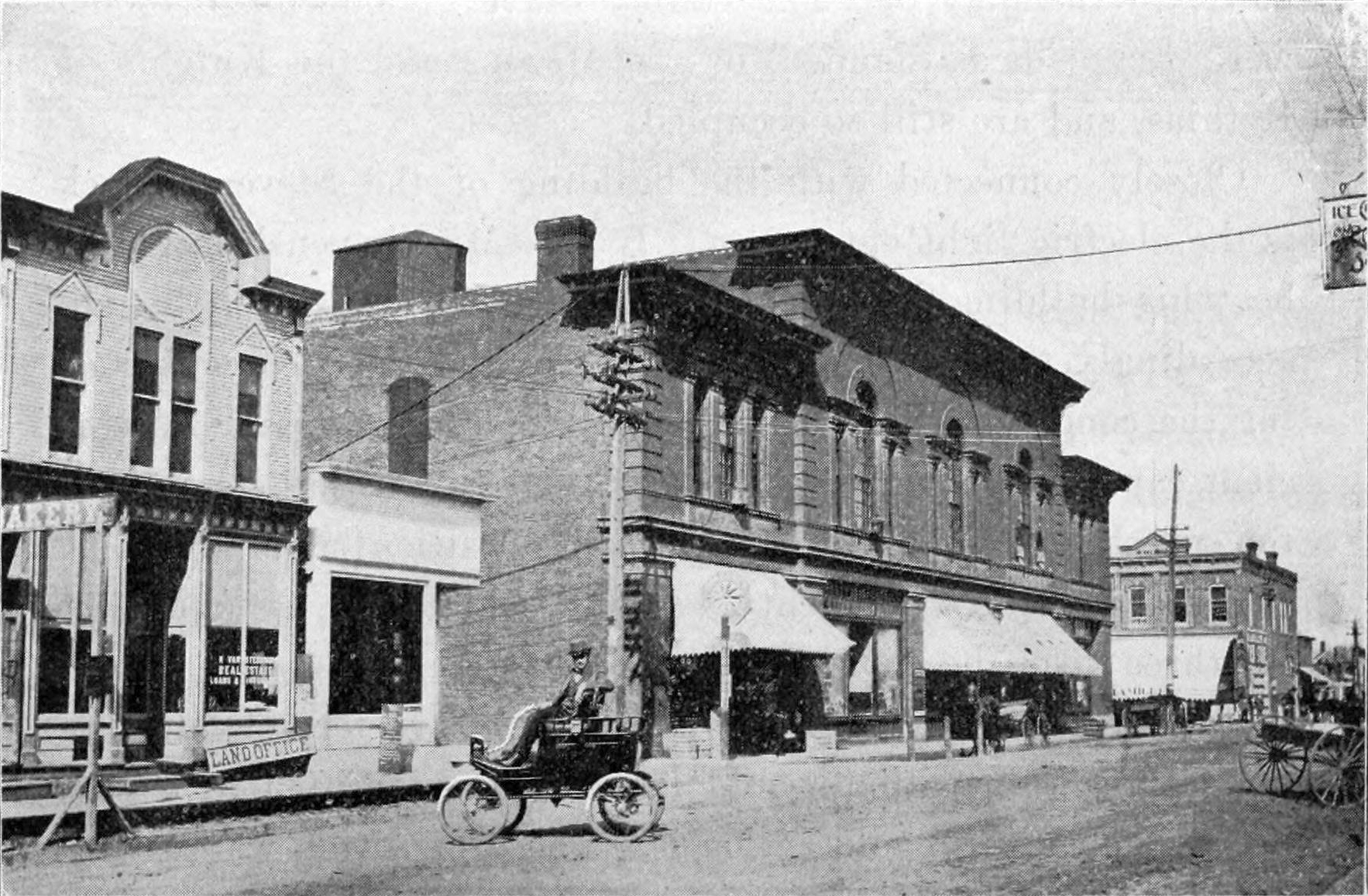
Stevens Block, 1902

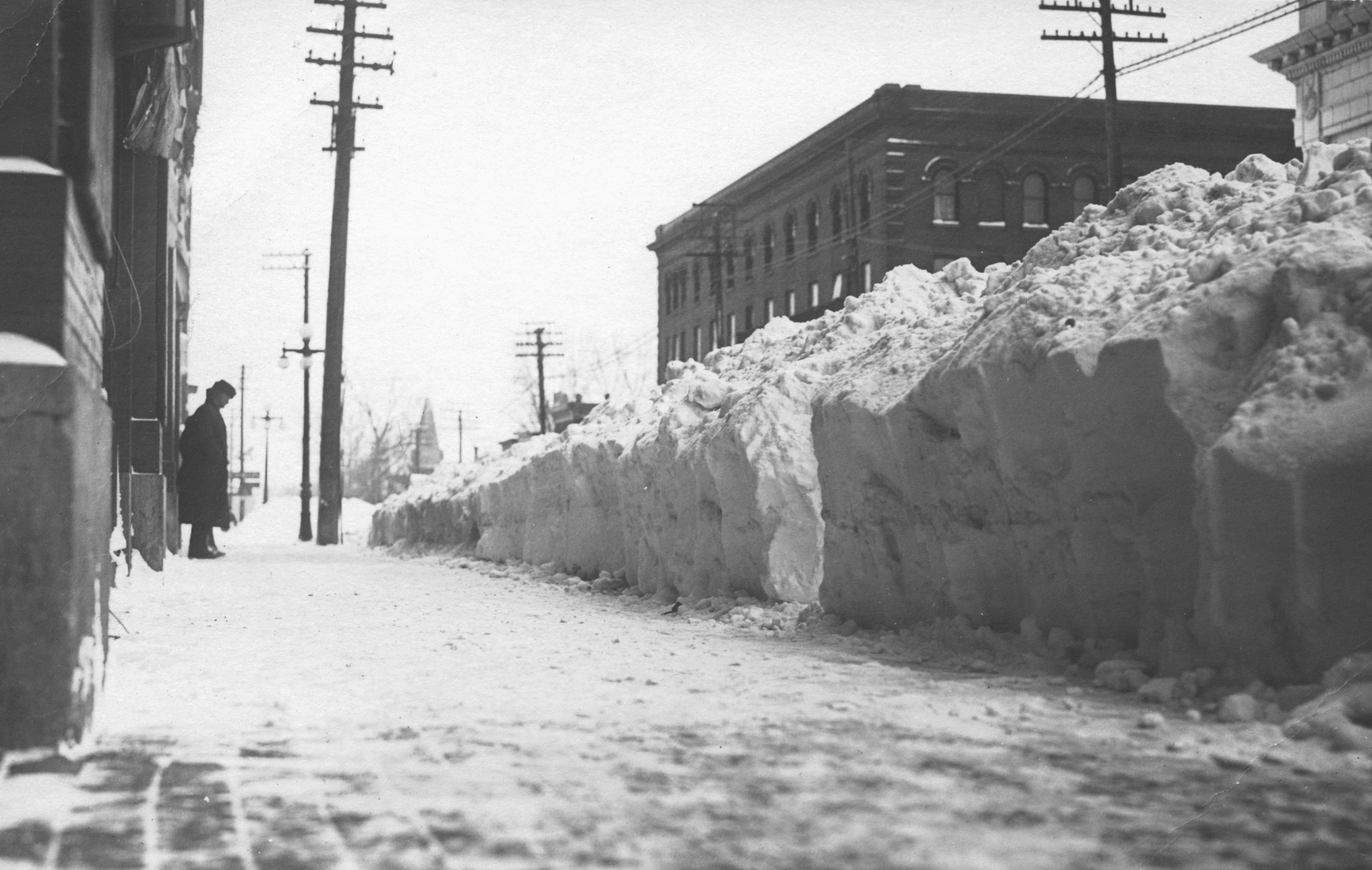
Main Street, 1936

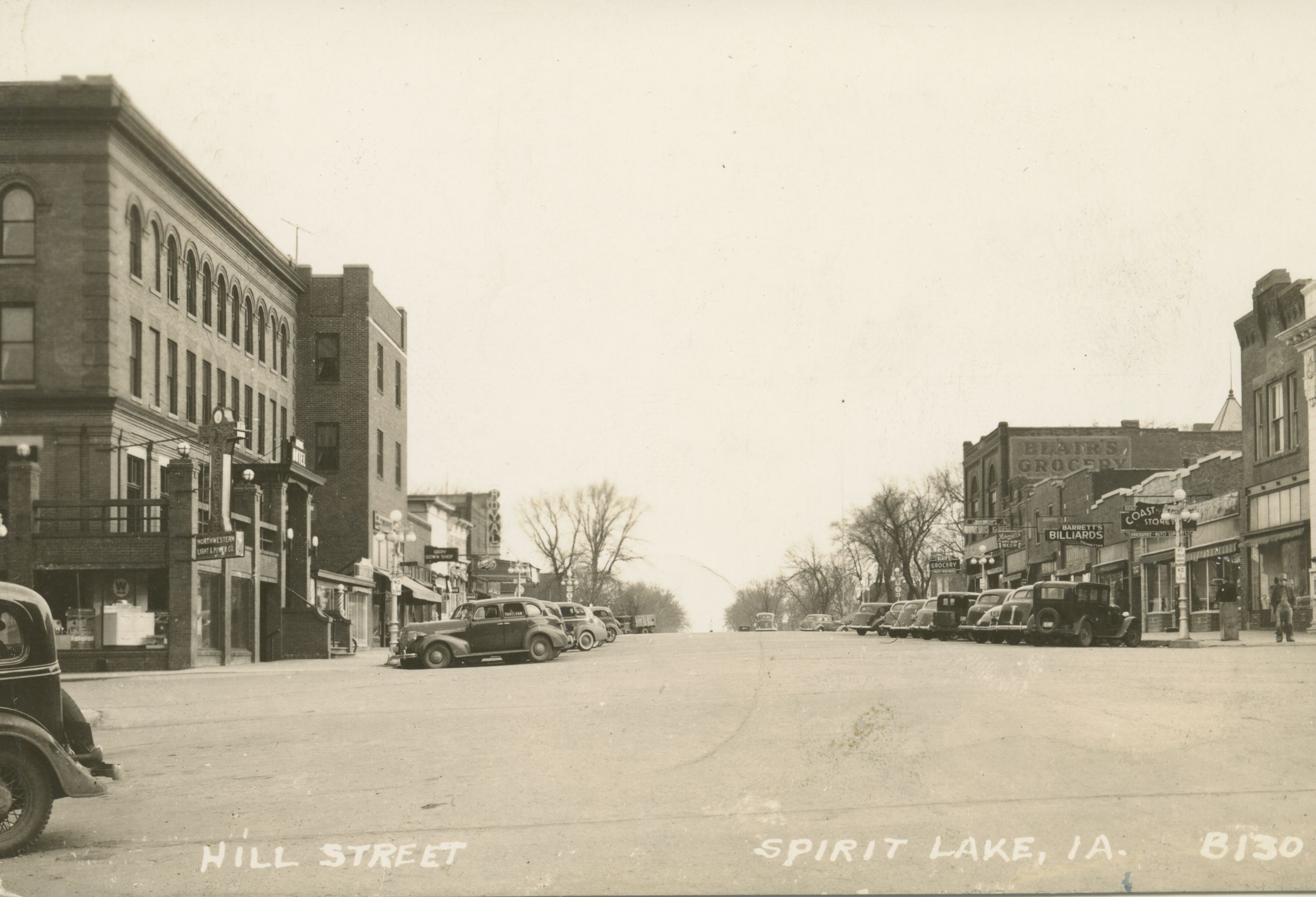
Main Street, 1920

== Geography ==
According to the United States Census Bureau, the city has a total area of 4.65 square miles (12.04 km^{2}), of which 4.63 square miles (11.99 km^{2}) is land and 0.02 square miles (0.05 km^{2}) is water.

=== Climate ===
Climate data for Spirit Lake, Iowa (1991–2020)
Month	Jan	Feb	Mar	Apr	May	Jun	Jul	Aug	Sep	Oct	Nov	Dec	Year
Mean daily maximum °F (°C)	24.0 (−4.4)	28.3 (−2.1)	41.6 (5.3)	55.9 (13.3)	68.2 (20.1)	78.9 (26.1)	82.8 (28.2)	80.1 (26.7)	73.1 (22.8)	59.0 (15.0)	42.3 (5.7)	28.6 (−1.9)	55.2 (12.9)
Daily mean °F (°C)	15.6 (−9.1)	19.6 (−6.9)	32.4 (0.2)	45.5 (7.5)	57.9 (14.4)	68.7 (20.4)	72.7 (22.6)	70.1 (21.2)	62.6 (17.0)	48.8 (9.3)	33.6 (0.9)	20.8 (−6.2)	45.7 (7.6)
Mean daily minimum °F (°C)	7.1 (−13.8)	11.0 (−11.7)	23.2 (−4.9)	35.1 (1.7)	47.6 (8.7)	58.6 (14.8)	62.6 (17.0)	60.2 (15.7)	52.1 (11.2)	38.6 (3.7)	24.9 (−3.9)	12.9 (−10.6)	36.2 (2.3)
Average precipitation inches (mm)	0.55 (14)	0.63 (16)	1.43 (36)	2.99 (76)	4.13 (105)	4.77 (121)	3.53 (90)	3.69 (94)	3.03 (77)	2.09 (53)	1.39 (35)	0.82 (21)	29.05 (738)
Average snowfall inches (cm)	9.5 (24)	8.2 (21)	6.0 (15)	5.1 (13)	0.1 (0.25)	0.0 (0.0)	0.0 (0.0)	0.0 (0.0)	0.0 (0.0)	0.4 (1.0)	4.2 (11)	8.0 (20)	41.5 (105.25)
Source: NOAA

== Demographics ==
Historical population
Census	Pop.	Note	%±
1870	76		—
1880	277		264.5%
1890	782		182.3%
1900	1,219		55.9%
1910	1,162		−4.7%
1920	1,701		46.4%
1930	1,778		4.5%
1940	2,161		21.5%
1950	2,467		14.2%
1960	2,685		8.8%
1970	3,014		12.3%
1980	3,976		31.9%
1990	3,872		−2.6%
2000	4,261		10.0%
2010	4,840		13.6%
2020	5,439		12.4%
U.S. Decennial Census

=== 2020 census ===
As of the 2020 census, Spirit Lake had a population of 5,439, with 2,380 households and 1,410 families.

The population density was 1,214.6 inhabitants per square mile (469.0/km^{2}). There were 2,806 housing units at an average density of 626.6 per square mile (241.9/km^{2}). Of housing units, 15.2% were vacant; the homeowner vacancy rate was 1.5% and the rental vacancy rate was 9.9%.

Of the 2,380 households, 25.4% had children under the age of 18 living in them. Of all households, 47.3% were married-couple households, 6.6% were cohabiting-couple households, 19.7% were households with a male householder and no spouse or partner present, and 26.5% were households with a female householder and no spouse or partner present. About 40.8% were non-families, 34.8% were made up of individuals, and 15.0% had someone living alone who was 65 years of age or older.

The median age was 42.5 years. 23.4% of residents were under the age of 20 (including 21.1% under 18), 5.4% were between the ages of 20 and 24, 23.9% were from 25 to 44, 24.3% were from 45 to 64, and 23.0% were 65 years of age or older. The gender makeup of the city was 47.9% male and 52.1% female.

99.3% of residents lived in urban areas, while 0.7% lived in rural areas.

Racial composition as of the 2020 census
Race	Number	Percent
White	5,121	94.2%
Black or African American	32	0.6%
American Indian and Alaska Native	12	0.2%
Asian	25	0.5%
Native Hawaiian and Other Pacific Islander	0	0.0%
Some other race	45	0.8%
Two or more races	204	3.8%
Hispanic or Latino (of any race)	144	2.6%

=== 2010 census ===
As of the census of 2010, there were 4,840 people, 2,157 households, and 1,268 families living in the city. The population density was 1,045.4 inhabitants per square mile (403.6/km^{2}). There were 2,578 housing units at an average density of 556.8 per square mile (215.0/km^{2}). The racial makeup of the city was 97.7% White, 0.2% African American, 0.2% Native American, 0.6% Asian, 0.1% Pacific Islander, 0.1% from other races, and 1.1% from two or more races. Hispanic or Latino of any race were 1.3% of the population.

There were 2,157 households, of which 27.2% had children under the age of 18 living with them, 47.5% were married couples living together, 7.6% had a female householder with no husband present, 3.7% had a male householder with no wife present, and 41.2% were non-families. 36.5% of all households were made up of individuals, and 16.8% had someone living alone who was 65 years of age or older. The average household size was 2.19 and the average family size was 2.88.

The median age in the city was 41.9 years. 23.1% of residents were under the age of 18; 6% were between the ages of 18 and 24; 24.6% were from 25 to 44; 26.3% were from 45 to 64; and 19.9% were 65 years of age or older. The gender makeup of the city was 47.1% male and 52.9% female.

=== 2000 census ===
As of the census of 2000, there were 4,261 people, 1,792 households, and 1,130 families living in the city. The population density was 1,280.2 inhabitants per square mile (494.3/km^{2}). There were 2,024 housing units at an average density of 608.1 per square mile (234.8/km^{2}). The racial makeup of the city was 98.99% White, 0.14% African American, 0.12% Native American, 0.05% Asian, 0.09% from other races, and 0.61% from two or more races. Hispanic or Latino of any race were 0.63% of the population.

There were 1,792 households, out of which 29.3% had children under the age of 18 living with them, 50.6% were married couples living together, 10.3% had a female householder with no husband present, and 36.9% were non-families. 32.8% of all households were made up of individuals, and 15.5% had someone living alone who was 65 years of age or older. The average household size was 2.30 and the average family size was 2.92.

Age spread: 24.6% under the age of 18, 6.9% from 18 to 24, 25.8% from 25 to 44, 23.9% from 45 to 64, and 18.8% who were 65 years of age or older. The median age was 40 years. For every 100 females, there were 85.1 males. For every 100 females age 18 and over, there were 81.6 males.

The median income for a household in the city was $36,224, and the median income for a family was $44,652. Males had a median income of $30,746 versus $21,357 for females. The per capita income for the city was $18,661. About 5.3% of families and 6.6% of the population were below the poverty line, including 2.9% of those under age 18 and 12.6% of those age 65 or over.

== Education ==
Public education in the city of Spirit Lake is provided by the Spirit Lake Community School District.

== Media ==
Spirit Lake is served by the Dickinson County News, both in print and online, KUOO-FM (103.9) and KUQQ-FM.

== Notable people ==
- Berkley Bedell (1921–2019), member of the U.S. House of Representatives from Iowa's 6th district (1975–1987)
- Margaret Hance (1923–1990), first female mayor of Phoenix, Arizona (1976–1983)
- Douglas Franklin Wright (1940–1996), serial killer

== See also ==
- Berkley, a manufacturer of fishing tackle, fishing reels and rods, located in Spirit Lake.
- Spirit Lake Massacre, an 1857 attack by a Wahpetuke band of Santee Sioux.
- Indian Motorcycles and Victory Motorcycles, are motorcycle manufacturers owned by Polaris Industries based in Spirit Lake.
