= Iowa Great Lakes =

Group of lakes in Iowa and Minnesota, U.S.

- Location within Iowa
- Interactive map of Iowa Great Lakes
- Coordinates: 43°23′09″N 95°06′28″W
- Website: vacationokoboji.com/about/

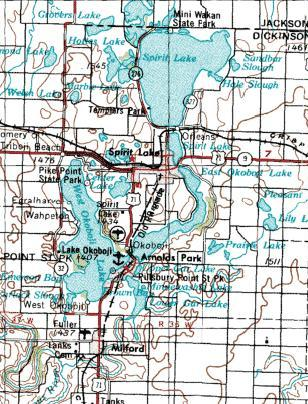
The Iowa Great Lakes region, showing Spirit Lake (top), West Okoboji Lake (left)

The Iowa Great Lakes, often referred to as Okoboji, is a group of natural lakes in northwestern Iowa in the United States. There are seven lakes in the region totaling 12,687 acres (5,134 ha) with the three principal lakes of the group being Big Spirit Lake, West Okoboji Lake, and East Okoboji Lake. They are the largest natural lakes in the state of Iowa. The largest, Spirit Lake, is 5,684 acres (2,300 ha). The lake area extends to the north into Jackson County, Minnesota. The headwaters of Little Sioux River flow past the west side of the lake area.

== History ==
The area around the Iowa Great Lakes was not known for permanent settlement by the Sioux but rather for recreation or hunting. When settlers arrived around 1856 it led to conflicts and eventually the Spirit Lake Massacre in 1857.

After the massacre, European settlers slowly returned and by 1900 nearly 8,000 people were living in the area. The Iowa Great Lakes Sanitary District was created in 1939 to protect the lakes from pollution and sanitary issues. Likewise, the Iowa Great Lakes Association was formed in 2008 when the waters were threatened by a large commercial agricultural development.

== Geography ==
The Iowa Great Lakes region was formed 13,500 years ago along the southwest edge of the Des Moines lobe ice sheet as it pressed south into Iowa. The deepest part of the lake is 136 feet (41 m) in West Okoboji Lake.

The Iowa Great Lakes lie within the Spirit Lake Micropolitan Area and the towns of Spirit Lake and Milford are within the lake area.

== See also ==
- University of Okoboji
- Geography of Iowa
- Arnolds Park, Iowa
