= Iowa Department of Natural Resources =

Agency in the US state of Iowa

- Iowa DNR logo

Agency overview
- Formed: 1986
- Headquarters: 502 East 9th Street, Des Moines, Iowa 50319-0034
- Employees: 1,170
- Agency executive: Kayla Lyon, Director
- Website: Official website

The Iowa Department of Natural Resources (Iowa DNR or IA DNR) is a department/agency of the U.S. state of Iowa formed in 1986, charged with maintaining state parks and forests, protecting the environment of Iowa, and managing energy, fish, wildlife, land resources, and water resources of Iowa.

== History ==
The DNR was created by the 71st General Assembly in 1986 under Terry E. Branstad, member of the Republican Party of Iowa, by combining four previous state agencies: Water, Air, and Waste Management; parts of the Iowa Energy Policy Council; the Iowa Conservation Commission; and the Iowa Geological Survey Organization.

Directors of the DNR since its formation in 1986 have been

- Larry J. Wilson, 1986-1999, Chief of Iowa Conservation Commission
- Paul Johnson, 1999–2000 M.S in Forestry
- Lyle Asell, 2000 (acting), B.S. Fish and Wildlife Biology, Governor Vilsack
- Jeffrey R. Vonk, 2001-2006, Wildlife Management, B.S. Forest Biology.
- Richard Leopold, 2007-2010, naturalist
- Roger Lande, 2010-2012, lawyer
- Chuck Gipp, 2012–2018, dairy farmer
- Kayla Lyon, 2019–present

== Organization ==
As of 2014, the DNR had 1,200 full-time equivalent employees. It is headed by a Governor of Iowa-appointed director, which as of May 2019 has been Kayla Lyon. The DNR has three service divisions: conservation and recreation, environmental services and management services.

There are two governor-appointed citizen commissions that decide on policies and administrative rules:

=== Natural Resource Commission ===
The Natural resource Commission oversees fish, wildlife, parks and forestry issues.

=== Environmental Protection Commission ===
The nine-member Environmental Protection Commission oversees water, land and air quality issues. Of the nine commissioners at least 5 members have been identified in 2014 based on public records, to have a conflict of interest, when it comes to stricter environmental protections, particularly the enforcement of the Clean Water Act.

- Nancy Couser owns feedlots and confinements housing 5,200 cattle.
- Cindy Greiman, whose husband owns feedlots and confinements housing 3,794 cattle.
- Brent Rastetter owns two confinements housing 9,200 hogs and is the CEO of Quality Ag Builders Inc., a company that builds confinements and manure pits. He is a major campaign donor to Terry Bransatd.
- Max Smith owns a hog gestation factory farm that houses 4,117 hogs.
- Gene Ver Steeg, former president of the Iowa Pork Producers Association, owns confinements housing 20,000 hogs and had a manure spill at one of his operations in fall 2013. An April 2013 Wall Street Journal article quoted him saying that "Clean Water Act regulations were a waste of money".

=== Division of Environmental Services ===
As of 2013 it consisted of five bureaus: Water Quality, Air Quality, Land Quality, Field Services and Compliance, and Iowa Geological and Water Survey. Field Services staff inspect permitted facilities, annually reviewing permits for more than 200 confined animal feeding operations, approximately 5,500 manure management plans, permitting more than 450 solid waste facilities and writing more than 2,000 air permits.

==== Water quality ====
Iowa water quality assessments have been developed only since 1992. In 2013, the Iowa Geological and Water Survey published a "Survey of Iowa Groundwater and Evaluation of Public Well Vulnerability Classifications for Contaminants of Emerging Concern". The most commonly found contaminant was pesticides in 41% of samples, with as many as 6 pesticide compounds together, and mostly chloroacetanilide degradates. Glyphosate was not detected, and its metabolite was only detected in two of 60 wells (3%) at the detection limit of 0.02 μg/L. In 35% of 63 samples pharmaceutical compounds were found. Of the 14 drugs, six were above the method reporting limit, the highest of which was acetaminophen. One in five of the wells contained microorganisms, most frequently pepper mild mottle virus (PMMV), GII norovirus, both human and bovine polyomavirus, and Campylobacter.

As of 2014, the Iowa Geological and Water Survey no longer appears in the DNR organization chart, as its eight scientists became part of the Iowa Institute of Hydraulic Research (IIHR) Hydroscience & Engineering at the University of Iowa.

As of 2016, the most recent Iowa's impaired water list was from 2014. It contained 571 waterbodies with a total of 754 impairments. Water quality problems continue unabated. In 2023, the state general fund eliminated $500,000 in funding of 66 water quality monitors; it was "reallocated" to other conservation programs.

=== Division of Conservation and Recreation Services ===
The division assists in wildlife population surveys, provides conservation information to the public, and conducts hunter, boater, ATV and snowmobile safety programs. The division formerly consisted of seven bureaus: A 'Fisheries Bureau', a 'Wildlife Bureau' managing 356,000 acres (1,440 km^{2}) of public land for recreational use, a 'Forestry Bureau', a 'State Parks Bureau' a 'Land and Waters Bureau', an 'Engineering Services Bureau' and a 'Law Enforcement Bureau' where conservation officers enforce laws related to fish, wildlife, boating, snowmobiling and all-terrain vehicles.

As of July 2014, the division had only six bureaus, because the Engineering Services Bureau and the Land/Waters Bureau merged to Engineering Land/Waters.

==== Forestry Bureau ====
It provides technical assistance to Iowa tree, forest and prairie owners and businesses with forestry and prairie management planning, cost-share programs and education. The bureau manages more than 40,000 acres (160 km^{2}) of forests for timber, wildlife, watershed protection and recreation. It operates state nurseries in Ames, Iowa and Montrose, Iowa producing 4 million tree and shrub seedlings annually at low cost to the public for erosion control, wildlife habitat and reforestation.

==== Parks Bureau ====
The 'Parks Bureau' operates and maintains 84 parks and recreation areas with trails and cabins for camping, picnicking, swimming, boating and fishing. It is responsible for more than 90 state preserves set aside for their natural or cultural significance and supervises programs in recreation planning and resource protection. As of 2018, there was one employee each for 29 of Iowa's 78 state parks, forests and off-road vehicle areas and one law enforcement official for every 9,011 people who hunt, fish or boat in the state.

== Line of duty deaths ==
3 Employees of the Iowa Department of Natural Resources have been killed in the line of duty.

== Budget ==
The department receives less than 1 percent of the state’s general tax appropriations since it was founded, "routinely ranking among the lowest states in per capita spending on environmental protection". The DNR's annual budget as of 2013 was $213 million. Of that, only 6.7 percent is appropriated from the state general fund with the remainder from sources such as non-general fund appropriations, fees and federal funds. The general fund is critical, with about 35 percent used to leverage federal dollars and more than 50 percent used for state parks and state forests operation. The remaining 15% serves to bridge other funding sources that make up the operating budget.

== Criticism and lawsuits ==
In 2011, three environmental groups sued the US EPA to bring DNR's Concentrated Animal Feeding Operations (CAFO) program into compliance with the Clean Water Act.

In January 2015, the Des Moines Water Works declared its intent to file a lawsuit against three Iowa counties Buena Vista, Sac, and Calhoun county where groundwater water tests had shown nitrate levels as high as 39.2 mg/L, which was 4 times the federally required Safe Drinking Water Act limit of 10 mg/L as the DNR continued not to enforce the Clean Water Act.

In September 2021, the Iowa Chapter of the Sierra Club and Trout Unlimited filed a lawsuit against the DNR, alleging the agency improperly approved the manure management plan of a feedlot in northeastern Iowa, and that the plan had incorrect calculations of how much manure could be safely applied to fields nearby the operation. The feedlot, Supreme Beef, is a beef cattle feeding operation that was built in the Bloody Run watershed in Clayton County. On April 28, 2023, a Polk County District Court judge ruled that the DNR improperly approved the nutrient management plan and that the DNR would require Supreme Beef to resubmit a new plan.

== Magazine ==
IDNR produces Iowa Outdoors magazine with a reported monthly circulation of 40,000.

== See also ==
- List of law enforcement agencies in Iowa
- List of state and territorial fish and wildlife management agencies in the United States
