= National Register of Historic Places listings in Dickinson County, Iowa =

Location of Dickinson County in Iowa

This is a list of the National Register of Historic Places listings in Dickinson County, Iowa.

This is intended to be a complete list of the properties and districts on the National Register of Historic Places in Dickinson County, Iowa, United States. Latitude and longitude coordinates are provided for many National Register properties and districts; these locations may be seen together in a map.

There are 12 properties and districts listed on the National Register in the county. Another two properties were once listed on the Register but have since been removed.

This National Park Service list is complete through NPS recent listings posted March 21, 2025.

== Current listings ==
	Name on the Register	Image	Date listed	Location	City or town	Description
1	Antlers Hotel	Antlers Hotel	May 24, 2007 (#07000452)	1703 Hill Ave. 43°25′30″N 95°06′06″W	Spirit Lake	
2	Gerome Clark House	Gerome Clark House	November 9, 1977 (#77000510)	East of Milford; 43°19′50″N 95°04′03″W	Milford	
3	Gull Point State Park, Area A	Gull Point State Park, Area A	November 15, 1990 (#90001661)	Off Iowa Highway 86 on the western shore of West Okoboji Lake; 43°22′16″N 95°10′05″W	Milford	
4	Gull Point State Park, Area B	Gull Point State Park, Area B	November 15, 1990 (#90001662)	Off Iowa Highway 86 on the western shore of West Okoboji Lake; 43°22′22″N 95°09′44″W	Milford	
5	Iowa Lakeside Laboratory Historic District		December 23, 1991 (#91001830)	Iowa Highway 86 about 4 miles north-northwest of its junction with U.S. Route 71; 43°22′56″N 95°10′52″W	Milford	
6	Mini-Wakan State Park Historic District		February 17, 2010 (#10000021)	24490 100th St. 43°30′00″N 95°06′01″W	Spirit Lake	
7	Okoboji Bridge		June 25, 1998 (#98000789)	180th Ave. over a branch of the Little Sioux River; 43°15′39″N 95°13′46″W	Milford	
8	Pikes Point State Park Shelter and Steps		November 15, 1990 (#90001675)	West of the junction of U.S. Route 71 and Iowa Highway 9; 43°24′58″N 95°09′42″W	Spirit Lake	
9	Pillsbury Point State Park	Pillsbury Point State Park	January 12, 1993 (#90001674)	Off U.S. Route 71 west of Minnewashta Lake; 43°22′04″N 95°08′27″W	Arnolds Park	
10	Spirit Lake Massacre Log Cabin	Spirit Lake Massacre Log Cabin	April 3, 1973 (#73000724)	West of Estherville on U.S. Route 71; 43°22′35″N 95°07′45″W	Arnolds Park	Abbie Gardner Sharp Cabin at the memorial site operated by the State Historical Society of Iowa.
11	Spirit Lake Public Library	Spirit Lake Public Library	January 24, 1980 (#80001448)	1801 Hill Ave. 43°25′20″N 95°06′05″W	Spirit Lake	
12	Trappers Bay State Park Picnic Shelter		November 15, 1990 (#90001676)	North of the junction of Iowa Highways 9 and 219; 43°27′14″N 95°20′04″W	Lake Park	

== Former listings ==
	Name on the Register	Image	Date listed	Date removed	Location	City or town	Description
1	Dickinson County Courthouse	Dickinson County Courthouse	July 2, 1981 (#81000235)	September 13, 2006	Hill Avenue	Spirit Lake	Demolished in 2006
2	Templar Park	Templar Park	August 3, 1977 (#77000511)	September 13, 2006	Northeast of Orleans on Iowa Highway 276	Orleans	Demolished on May 19, 1981

== See also ==
- List of National Historic Landmarks in Iowa
- National Register of Historic Places listings in Iowa
- Listings in neighboring counties: Clay, Emmet, Jackson (MN), Osceola
