= Pillsbury Point State Park =

State park in Dickinson County, Iowa

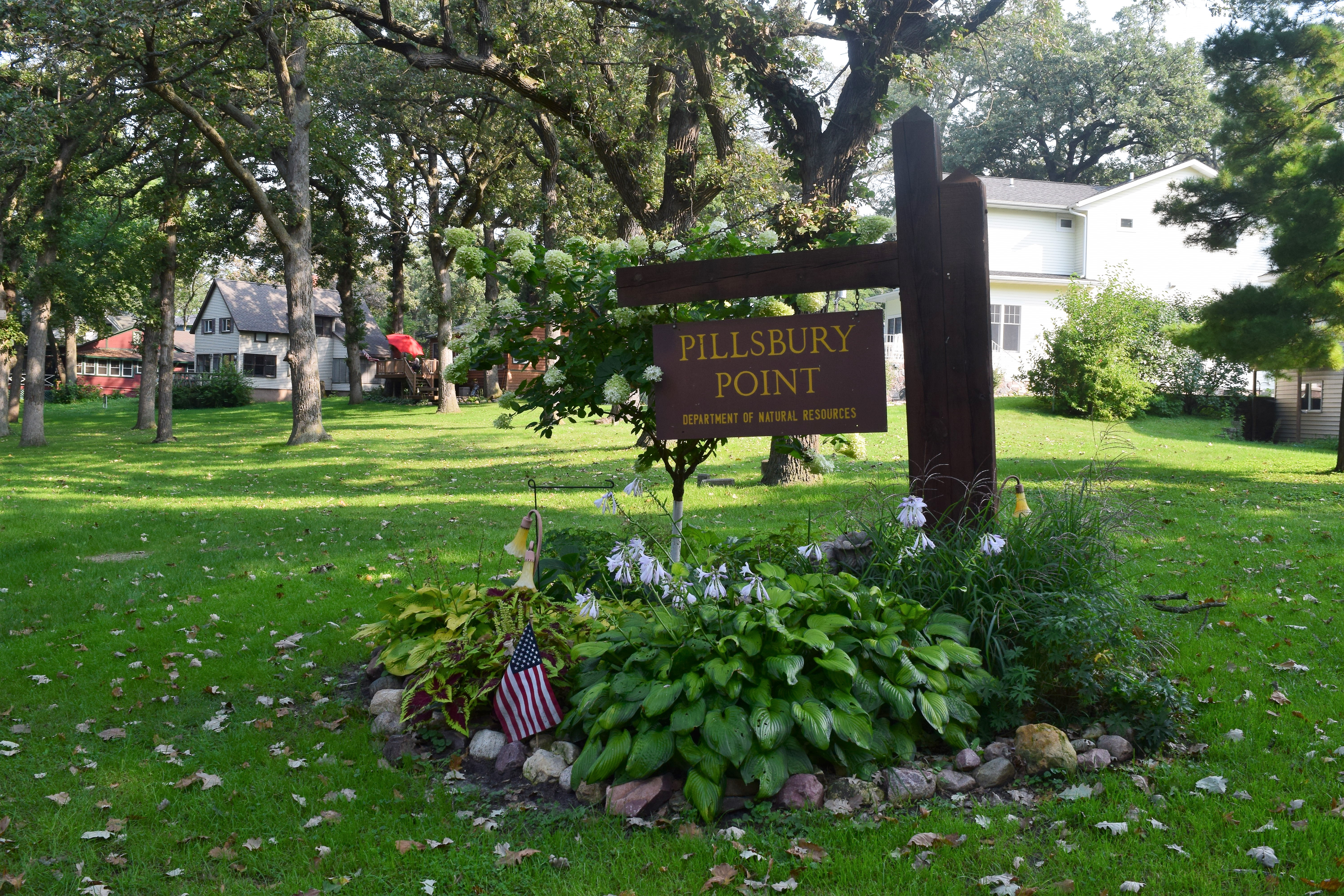
- Sign at the park's entrance

- Location within Iowa Location within the United States
- Location: Dickinson, Iowa, United States
- Coordinates: 43°22′03″N 95°08′29.5″W
- Area: 6.48 acres (2.62 ha)
- Elevation: 1,424 ft (434 m)
- Established: 1933
- Governing body: Iowa Department of Natural Resources
- Pillsbury Point State Park
- U.S. National Register of Historic Places
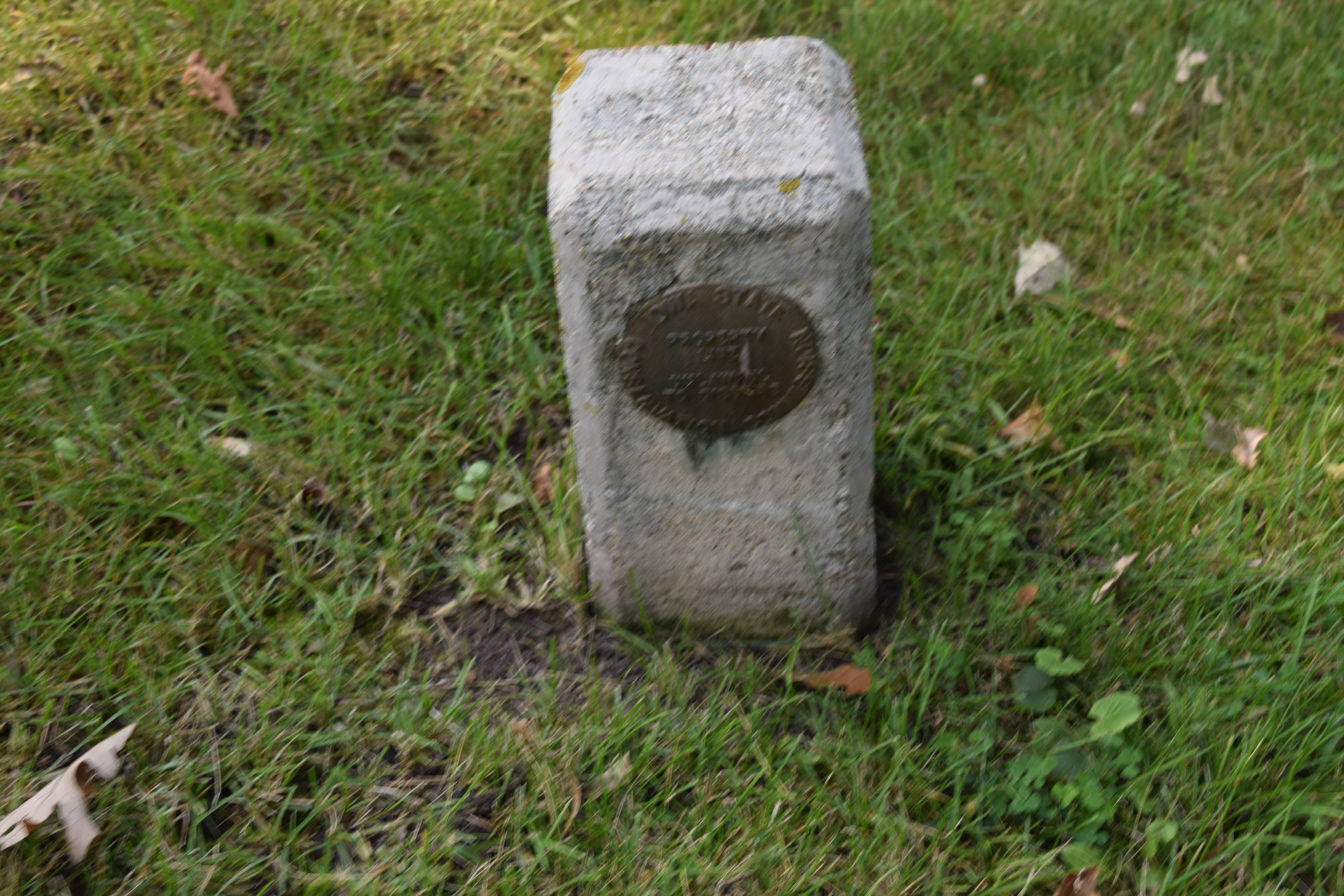
- One of the boundary markers.
- Area: 1.5 acres (0.61 ha)
- Built: 1933-1934
- Architect: Central Design Office, Ames
- Architectural style: Rustic
- MPS: CCC Properties in Iowa State Parks MPS
- NRHP reference No.: 90001674
- Added to NRHP: January 12, 1993

Pillsbury Point State Park is located in Arnolds Park, Iowa, United States. It is Iowa's smallest state park and unlike the others, it is an urban park. At 6.48 acres (2.62 ha), it is a narrow park that extends along a point of land into West Okoboji Lake adjacent to private summer houses. The overlook at the north end of the park was listed on the National Register of Historic Places in 1990. The historic designation includes walkways along the lake, stone steps, stone benches, and property boundary markers.

== History ==
Pillsbury Point was the location of the Spirit Lake Massacre (1857) in which forty settlers were killed and four women were taken hostage by the Dakota tribe. Graves for several victims, a monument (1895), and the Gardner cabin are adjacent to the park. The Rev. Samuel Pillsbury, for whom the park is named, owned the property in the 1860s. H.H. Lantz developed the property into a recreation area in the 1890s. His widow, Florence B. Lantz, and two other heirs, Miriam L. and John I. Cross, donated the property to the state of Iowa in 1928. Between October 1933 and March 1934 Civilian Conservation Corps (CCC) Company 778 built the walkways along the lake, the two sets of stone steps, and the five stone benches. In 1934 Pillsbury Point was re-designated as a state preserve, which were to protect areas of historic or scientific interest rather than recreational purposes. It was put under the jurisdiction of Gull Point State Park in 1936. In 1940 it was reclassified again as a historic-archaeological park based on the National Park Service's system. By the late 20th century the park became known as an access.

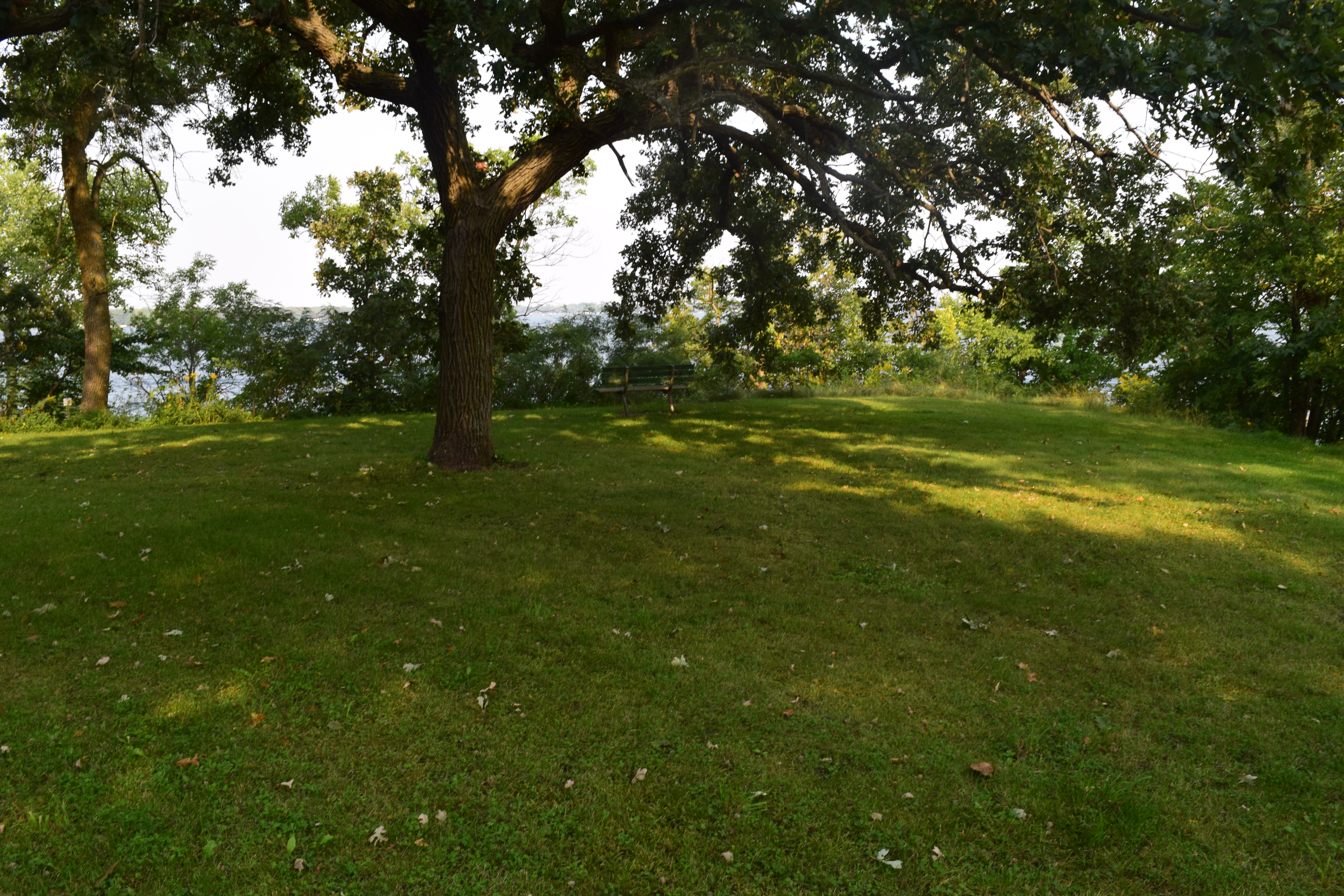
Overlook area

The historic significance of the overlook is derived from its landscape-based approach to park development, which reached its peak during the 1930s. Pillsbury Point is almost entirely landscape development as there are no buildings located here. The stone benches constructed by the CCC are tucked into the slopes along the shore so as not to intrude on the natural setting. Four of the benches are composed of mortared rubble stone backs and seats with a stone base in front of them. The fifth bench is also composed of mortared rubble stone, but is vaguely U-shaped and has no base in front of it. The two sets of steps are likewise mortared rubble stone. The six concrete property boundary markers delineate the property line on the south side of the overlook. There are twelve more markers that mark the parks boundary, but are outside the historic designation area.
