= Central Design Office, Ames =

The Central Design Office, Ames was a design office at Iowa State, in Ames, Iowa that designed public works, many built under the Civilian Conservation Corps program. It designed many that are listed on the U.S. National Register of Historic Places.

The Wanata State Park Picnic Shelter, for example, was built in 1934.

Works (attribution) include:

- Backbone State Park, Cabin--Bathing Area (Area A), Jct. of Co. Hwy. W69 and Co. Hwy. C54, Dundee, IA (Central Design Office, Ames), NRHP-listed
- Backbone State Park, Picnicking, Hiking & Camping Area (Area B), Jct. of Co. Hwy. W69 and Co. Hwy. C54, Dundee, IA (Central Design Office, Ames), NRHP-listed
- Backbone State Park, Richmond Springs (Area C), Jct. of Co. Hwy. W69 and Co. Hwy. C54, Dundee, IA (Central Design Office, Ames), NRHP-listed
- Beeds Lake State Park, Civilian Conservation Corps Area, Jct. of IA 3 and IA 134, Hampton, IA (Central Design Office, Ames), NRHP-listed
- Blackhawk State Park, Black Hawk Preserve (Area B), S of jct. of US 71 and Co. Hwy. M68, Lake View, IA (Central Design Office, Ames), NRHP-listed
- Blackhawk State Park, Denison Beach Area (Area C), S of jct. of US 71 and Co. Hwy. M68, Lake View, IA (Central Design Office, Ames), NRHP-listed
- Blackhawk State Park, Wildlife Preserve Area (Area A), S of jct. of US 71 and Co. Hwy. M68, Lake View, IA (Central Design Office, Ames), NRHP-listed
- Dolliver Memorial State Park, Entrance Area (Area A), N of IA 50 on Des Moines R., Lehigh, IA (Central Design Office, Ames), NRHP-listed
- Dolliver Memorial State Park, Picnic, Hiking & Maintenance Area (Area B), N of IA 50 on Des Moines R., Lehigh, IA (Central Design Office, Ames), NRHP-listed
- Geode State Park, Civilian Conservation Corps Area, Co. Rd. X23 E of Lowell, Danville, IA (Central Design Office, Ames), NRHP-listed
- Gull Point State Park, Area A, Off IA 86 on W Shore of W Okoboji Lake, Milford, IA (Central Design Office, Ames), NRHP-listed
- Gull Point State Park, Area B, Off IA 86 on W shore of W Okoboji Lake, Milford, IA (Central Design Office, Ames), NRHP-listed
- Lacey-Keosauqua State Park, Bathing Area (Area C), Off IA 1 on S bank of Des Moines R., Keosauqua, IA (Central Design Office, Ames), NRHP-listed
- Lacey-Keosauqua State Park, Lodge and Picnic Area (Area A), Off IA 1 on S bank of Des Moines R., Keosauqua, IA (Central Design Office, Ames), NRHP-listed
- Lacey-Keosauqua State Park, Picnic and Custodial Group (Area B), Off IA 1 on S bank of Des Moines R., Keosauqua, IA (Central Design Office, Ames), NRHP-listed
- Lake Ahquabi State Park, Bathhouse Area (Area B), 1650 118th Ave., Indianola, IA (Central Design Office, Ames), NRHP-listed
- Lake Ahquabi State Park, Picnic Area (Area A), 1650 118th Ave., Indianola, IA (Central Design Office, Ames), NRHP-listed
- Lake Ahquabi State Park, Refectory Area (Area C), 1650 118th Ave., Indianola, IA (Central Design Office, Ames), NRHP-listed
- Lake Keomah State Park, Bathhouse--Lodge Area (Area A), Off IA 371 S of jct. with IA 92, Oskaloosa, IA (Central Design Office, Ames), NRHP-listed
- Lake Keomah State Park, Erosion Control Area (Area B), Off IA 371 S of jct. with IA 92, Oskaloosa, IA (Central Design Office, Ames), NRHP-listed
- Maquoketa Caves State Park Historic District, County Road 428 northwest of Maquoketa, IA (Central Design Office), NRHP-listed
- Pikes Point State Park Shelter and Steps, W of jct. of IA 9 and US 71, Spirit Lake, IA (Central Design Office, Ames), NRHP-listed
- Pillsbury Point State Park, Off US 71 W of Minnewashta Lake, Arnolds Park, IA (Central Design Office, Ames), NRHP-listed
- Pilot Knob State Park, Amphitheater (Area 4), S of jct. of IA 9 and IA 332, Forest City, IA (Central Design Office, Ames), NRHP-listed
- Pilot Knob State Park, Observation Tower (Area 2), S of jct. of IA 9 and IA 332, Forest City, IA (Central Design Office, Ames), NRHP-listed
- Pilot Knob State Park, Picnic Shelter (Area 3), S of Jct. of IA 9 and IA 332, Forest City, IA (Central Design Office, Ames), NRHP-listed
- Pilot Knob State Park, Portals (Area 5a), S of jct. of IA 9 and IA 332, Forest City, IA (Central Design Office, Ames), NRHP-listed
- Pilot Knob State Park, Trail Area (Area 6a-6c), S of jct. of IA 9 and IA 332, Forest City, IA (Central Design Office, Ames), NRHP-listed
- Pilot Knob State Park: Portals in Area 5b, Off IA 9 SE of Forest City, Pilot Knob State Park, Forest City, IA (Central Design Office, Ames), NRHP-listed
- Springbrook State Park, Civilian Conservation Corps Area, Jct. of IA 384 and Co. Hwy. F25, Guthrie Center, IA (Central Design Office, Ames), NRHP-listed
- Squirrel Hollow County Park Historic District, E bank of N. Raccoon R. SE of Jefferson, Jefferson, IA (Central Design Office, Iowa State College), NRHP-listed
- Trappers Bay State Park Picnic Shelter, N of jct. of IA 219 and IA 9, Lake Park, IA (Central Design Office, Ames), NRHP-listed
- Wanata State Park Picnic Shelter, S of jct. of Co. Rd. M27 and IA 10, Peterson, IA (Central Design Office, Ames)
