= Pikes Point State Park =

State park in Dickinson County, Iowa

- Location within Iowa Location within the United States
- Location: Dickinson County, Iowa, United States
- Nearest city: Spirit Lake, Iowa
- Coordinates: 43°24′55″N 95°09′47″W
- Area: 15 acres (6.1 ha)
- Elevation: 1,444 ft (440 m)
- Established: 1931
- Administrator: Iowa Department of Natural Resources
- Website: Official website
- Pikes Point State Park Shelter and Steps
- U.S. National Register of Historic Places
- U.S. Historic district
- Area: less than one acre
- Built: 1933
- Architect: Central Design Office, Ames
- Architectural style: Rustic
- MPS: CCC Properties in Iowa State Parks MPS
- NRHP reference No.: 90001675
- Added to NRHP: November 15, 1990

Pikes Point State Park is located southwest of Spirit Lake, Iowa, United States. It is a small park on a point of land that projects into West Okoboji Lake. It provides space for picnicking, including a shelter listed on the National Register of Historic Places, a playground, a swimming beach, boating and fishing on the lake.

== History ==
Pikes Point was dedicated as a state park in 1931. Civilian Conservation Corps (CCC) Company 778 built the shelter, steps, trails, plantings, and the footings for the latrine by March 17, 1934. The park was put under the jurisdiction of Gull Point State Park in 1936.

== Park Shelter and Steps ==
The picnic shelter is located at the base of a slope to the lake. The Rustic style structure features a back wall and stepped end walls composed of random rubble stone. On the center of the back wall is a fireplace flanked by two stone benches. Four round timber posts with bracing hold up the timber roof supports and shed roof. The roof extends as a 7-foot (2.1 m) overhang in the back. Another fireplace is located there. The patio in back continues to the hillside and ends at a curved stone bench. A set of 29 stone steps ascend the 25-foot (7.6 m) hill south of the shelter. The significance of its architecture is that it was designed to blend into its natural surroundings by means of its material, design, and workmanship.
