= Pilot Knob State Park =

State park in Hancock County, Iowa

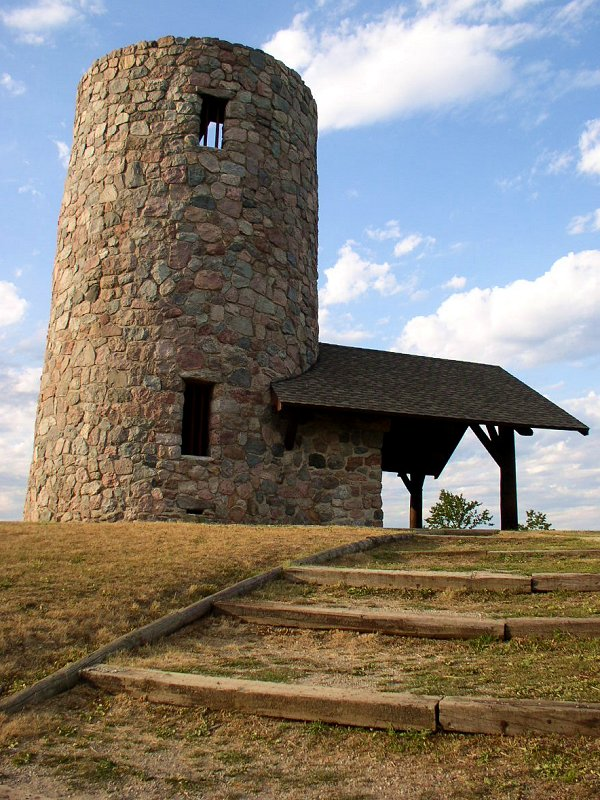
- Observation Tower

- Location within Iowa Location within the United States
- Location: Hancock County, Iowa, United States
- Coordinates: 43°14′56″N 93°33′26″W
- Area: 528 acres (214 ha)
- Elevation: 1,365 ft (416 m)
- Established: 1923
- Administrator: Iowa Department of Natural Resources
- Website: Official website

Pilot Knob State Park is located southeast of Forest City, Iowa, United States. Founded in 1923, it is one of the oldest state parks in Iowa. Between 1990 and 1995 one area was named nationally recognized historic district and five structures were individually listed on the National Register of Historic Places.

== History ==
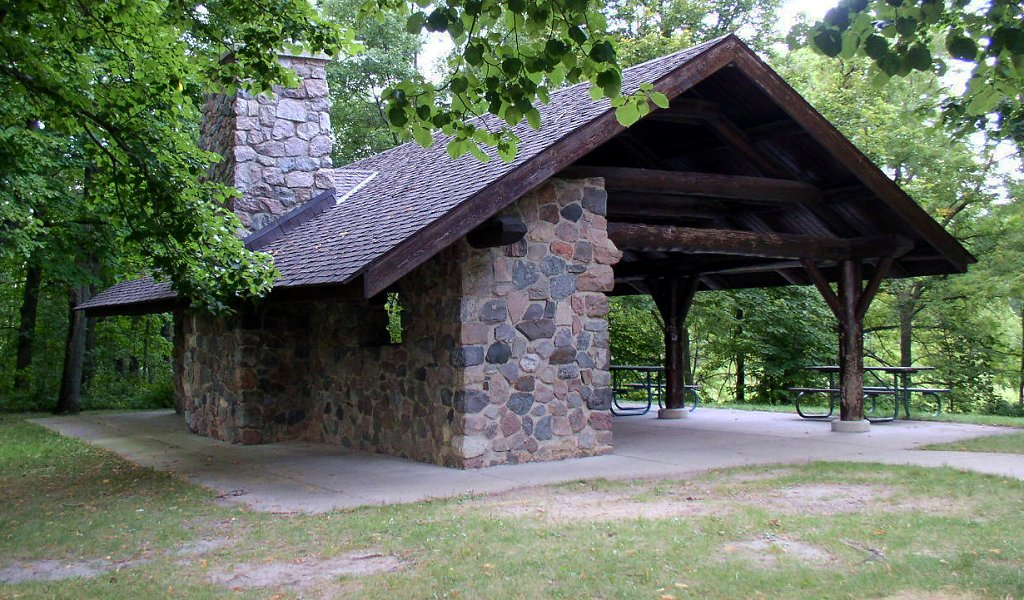
Picnic Shelter

A group of local citizens met in Forest City in August 1920, and 158 of them contributed $7,000 to buy the land. The state paid them for the same amount and acquired the land in 1921, and dedicated the park in 1923, making it one of the oldest units in the state park system in Iowa. The park was partially developed in the 1920s. The Civilian Conservation Corps (CCC) Company 1757 came from working at Dolliver State Park on April 7, 1934 to build several major buildings and structures and to landscape the park. They completed their work on October 8, 1934 and then moved on to Council Bluffs. At its inception the park was 237.5 acres (96.1 ha) before it grew to 375.13 acres (151.81 ha) in 1936, and was reduced to 368.81 acres (149.25 ha) in 1942. The state has subsequently added more property.

On November 15, 1990 the observation tower, picnic shelter, amphitheater, one set of entrance portals (Area 5a), and a trail area were listed on the National Register of Historic Places. A second set of entrance portals (Area 5b) were added on April 17, 1995. The park was part of a larger study of Iowa's state parks called the "Civilian Conservation Corps Properties in Iowa State Parks: 1933-1942".

=== Observation tower ===
The observation tower is located at the top of Pilot Knob. It is in the middle of a cleared area surrounded by timber. The tower is composed of two elements: a circular tower and a timber shelter in the rear. The tower rises to a height of 33.6 feet (10.2 m). It was designed, like all the historic structures in the park, in the rustic style by the Central Design Office in Ames. The walls are composed of rubble granite that taper slightly. A metal staircase is located on the interior. At the top of the tower is a metal floor and a waist-high wall. The shelter features a gable roof that is held up by round timbers.

=== Picnic shelter ===
The picnic shelter is located on a grassy area near timber southwest of Dead Man's Lake. It measures 25.75 by 42.5 feet (7.85 by 12.95 m). It features random rubble limestone at the rear of the structure and on the adjacent, partial side walls. A chimney is centered along the rear wall. Four round timber posts support the gable roof on the front. It has a poured concrete floor.

=== Amphitheater ===
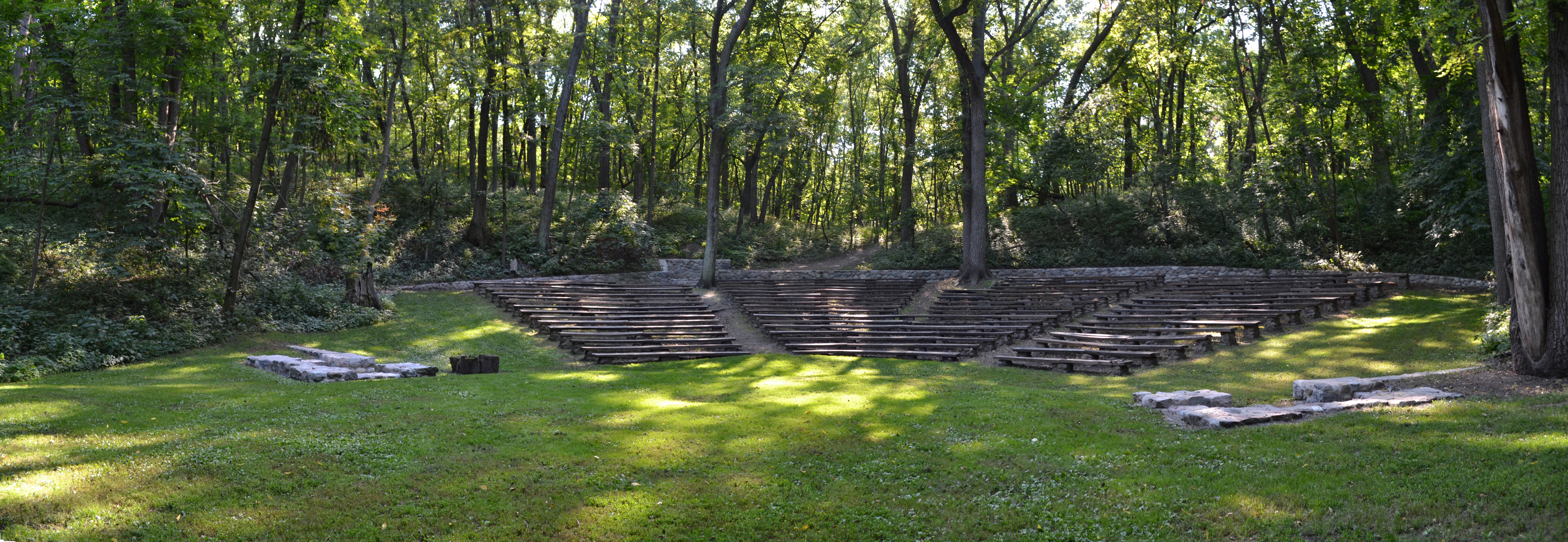
Amphitheater

The outdoor amphitheater is located in a small valley that is surrounded by timber in the eastern part of the park. It features four sections of seats on the hill that face a turf stage. The seating is composed of wood planks that rest on stone piers. A low, random, retaining wall of rubble stone encircles the south half of the opening behind the seats. Another rubble retaining wall is located behind the half circle turf stage. There are rubble stone stairs set in concrete that lead away from the amphitheater in the back. Two more sets of rubble steps flank the stage and are held in place by a retaining wall along the front. The amphitheater measures 128 by 130 feet (39 by 40 m).

=== Portals ===
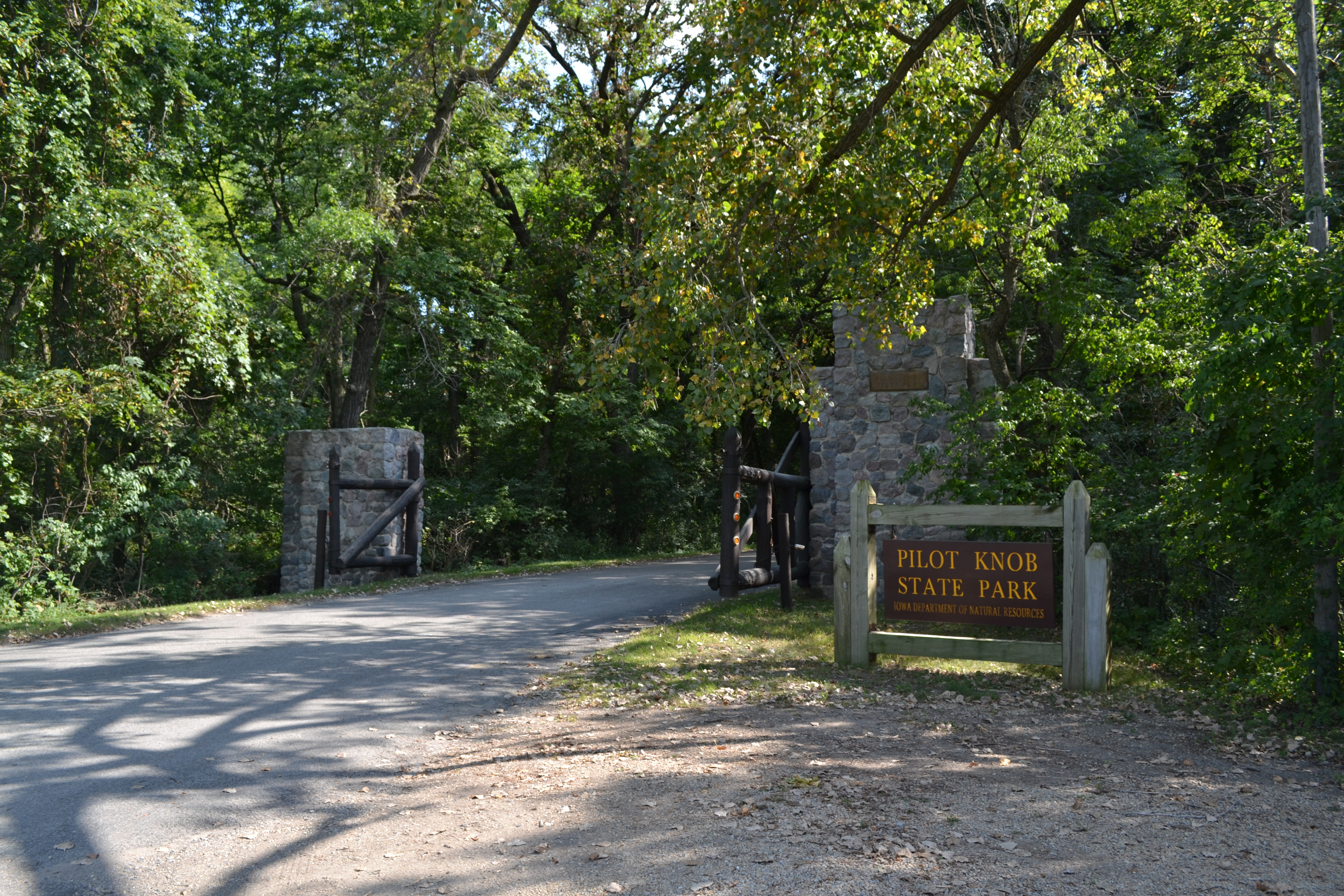
Northwest entrance portal (Area 5a)

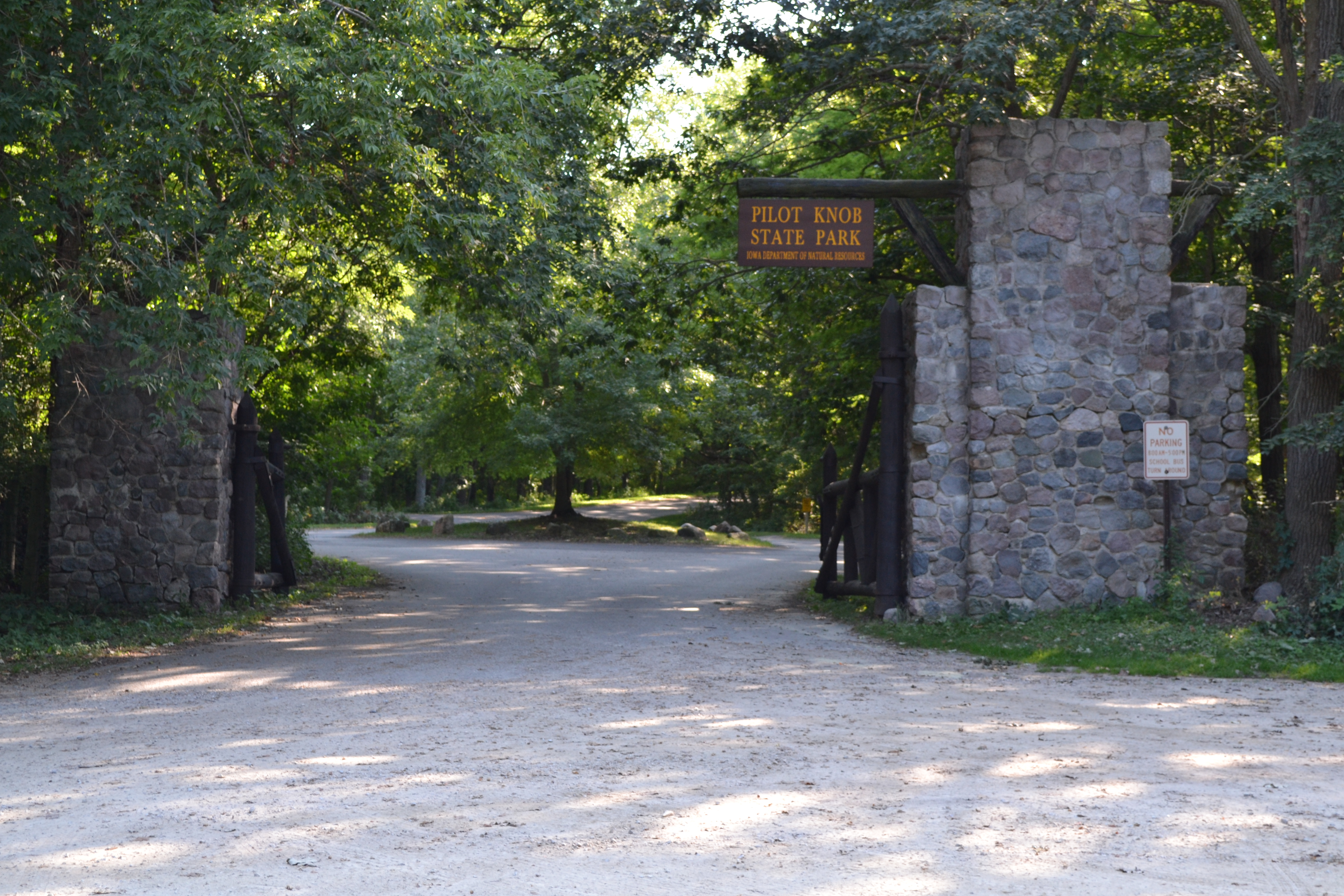
Northeast entrance portal (Area 5b)

There are two sets of entrance portals that flank entrance-ways on the north side of the park. They are both composed of two random rubble limestone pillars that differ somewhat in shape. The portals at the main entrance (Area 5a) on the northwest side of the park includes two rectangular pillars, one 10 feet (3.0 m) high and the other 16 feet (4.9 m) high. The second pillar has two lower, flanking wings. At one time the second pillar carried a wood sign that was suspended from a rounded timber bracing. The sign is now located in front of the pillar. The northeast entrance (Area 5b) likewise has two pillars of differing heights. These pillars are 11 feet (3.4 m) and 18 feet (5.5 m) high. The second pillar has side wings, and it retains its suspended sign. Both entrances have two rounded timber gates that close the entrance.

=== Trail area ===
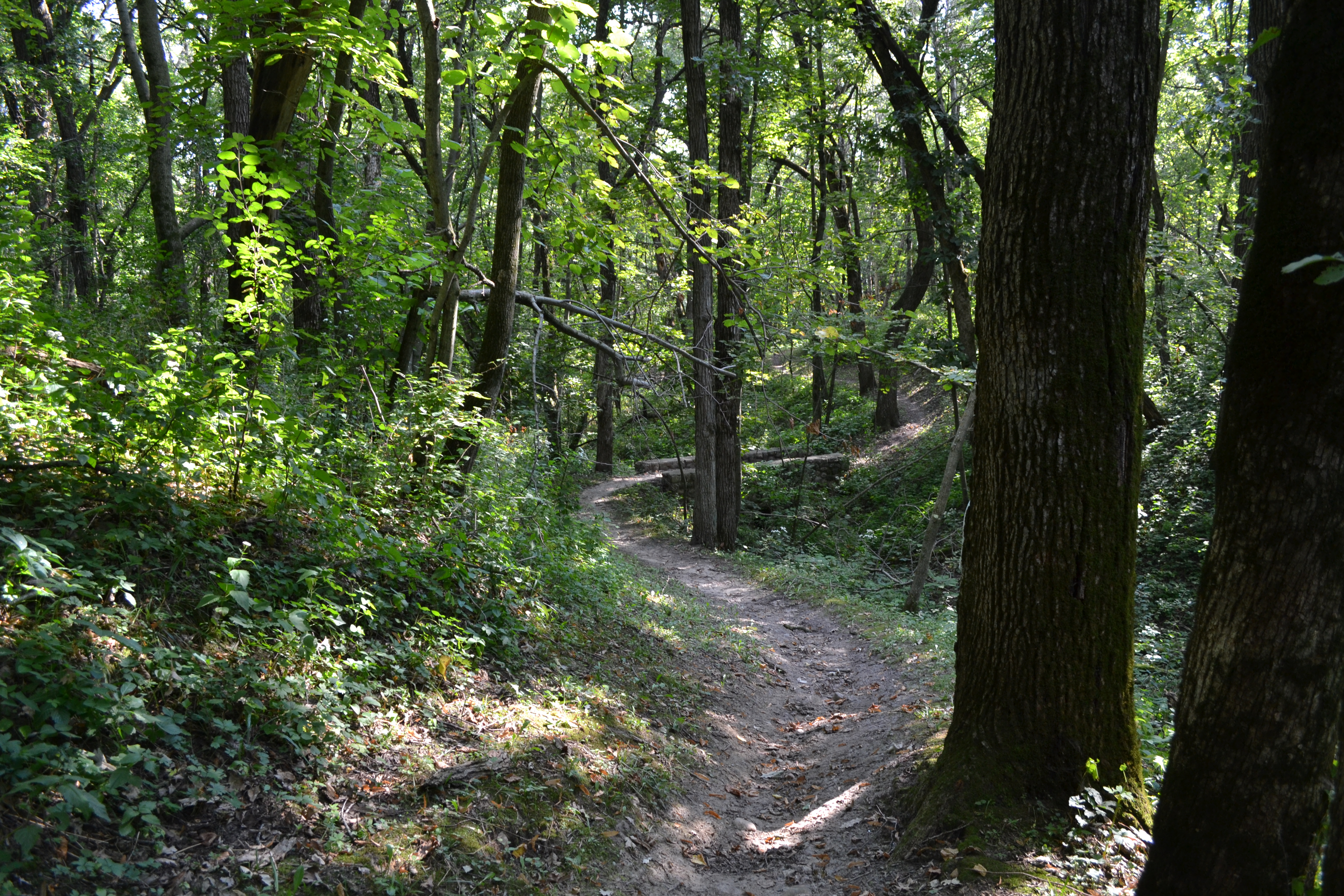
Trail area with a culvert in the center

The original trail features three random rubble limestone culverts that cross gullies. They measure from 8 feet (2.4 m) to 15.5 feet (4.7 m) in length and 3 feet (0.91 m) in width. The trails and culverts form a historic district.

== Land use ==
The park includes 15-acre (6.1 ha) Pilot Knob Lake, a man-made lake for boating, fishing, and ice skating in the winter. It also includes 4-acre (1.6 ha) Dead Man's Lake, a floating sphagnum bog. It is the only one of its kind in Iowa. The bog area is home to a variety of flora and waterfowl. The park also features trails for hiking and horseback riding, camping, picnic areas and shelters. There is a warming house with electricity and heat for winter sports enthusiasts. The Pilot Knob Recreation Area is located north of the park and its activities include hunting, hiking, and snowmobiling.
