= Springbrook State Park =

State park in Iowa, United States

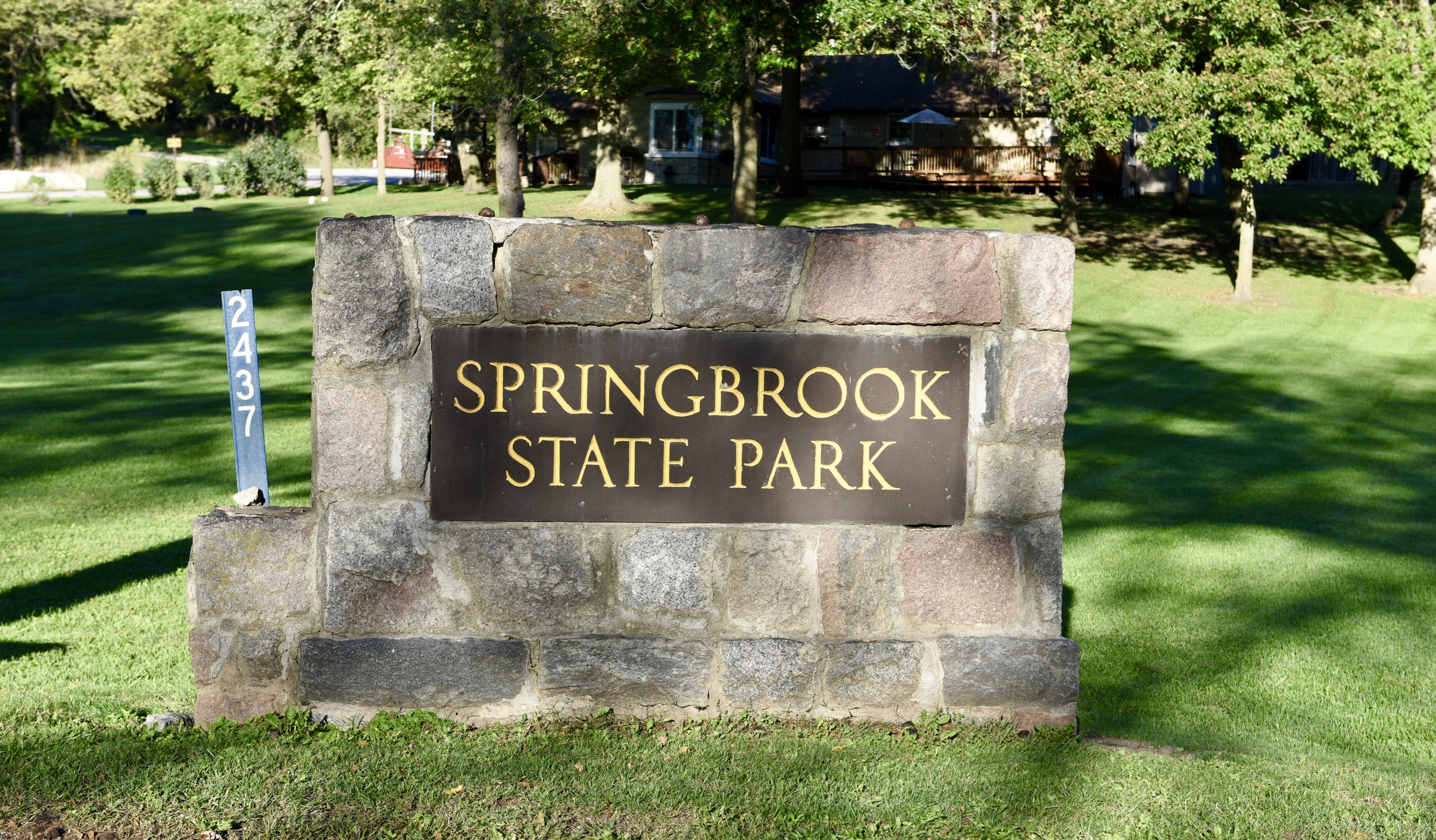

- Location within Iowa Location within the United States
- Location: Guthrie County, Iowa, United States
- Nearest city: Yale, Iowa
- Coordinates: 41°46′10″N 94°28′06″W
- Area: 930 acres (380 ha)
- Elevation: 1,047 ft (319 m)
- Established: 1926
- Administrator: Iowa Department of Natural Resources
- Website: Official website
- Springbrook State Park, Civilian Conservation Corps Area
- U.S. National Register of Historic Places
- U.S. Historic district
- Built: 1933-1941
- Built by: Civilian Conservation Corps
- Architect: Central Design Office, Ames
- Architectural style: Rustic
- MPS: CCC Properties in Iowa State Parks MPS
- NRHP reference No.: 90001671
- Added to NRHP: November 15, 1990

Springbrook State Park is a state park in Guthrie County, Iowa, United States, located approximately 5 miles (8.0 km) west of the city of Yale. The park contains a 17-acre (6.9 ha) spring-fed lake and timber-covered rolling hills along the Middle Raccoon River.

== Background ==
Originally known as King's Park, the area approximately 5.5 miles west of Yale was designated as one of the first of Iowa's state parks in 1926 by the Iowa Conservation Board. Beginning in 1933 and continuing during the 1930s the Civilian Conservation Corps constructed many of the facilities at Springbrook which are on the National Register of Historic Places.

== Recreation ==
Over 12 miles (19 km) of hiking trails and 4 miles (6.4 km) of snowmobiling trails are located throughout Springbrook. Woodlands, sandstone, prairie, and clearings are found throughout the park. Oak, maple, hickory, and basswood trees thrive in the timber areas of the park.

Swimming, canoeing, and fishing is possible on both the Middle Raccoon River and the man-made lake on Kings Creek. Three fishing jetties are located along the 17-acre (6.9 ha) spring-fed lake on Kings Creek. On the lake, motor boating is allowed only with electric motors. The Middle Raccoon River has a boat ramp and a fishing riffle. Crappie, largemouth bass, bluegill, sunfish, bullhead, and catfish, are regularly caught at Springbrook. Located lakeside are two picnic shelters and several other picnic areas that have tables, grills, water, and restrooms. Also, unsupervised swimming and sunbathing occur at the sandy beach along the lake.

Viewing abundant wildlife is very likely. Squirrels, rabbits, red fox, gray fox, coyote, bobcat, raccoon, beaver, muskrat, red-tailed hawk, bald eagle, wild turkey, Canada geese, and especially deer are often found at Springbrook.

A shooting range and a conservation education center is located at the park, now closed. Posted hunting areas include the northeast and southwest corners of the park.

== Camping ==
Camping is permitted March to November. 120 campsites (81 with electrical hookups) are available. Half of the sites are on a first-come, first-served basis but other sites can be reserved. Peak season is from May 1 until September 30. Modern showers and restrooms, a trailer dump station, a basketball court, horse shoe pits, sand volleyball are located in the large campground.

== Bicycling ==
Located between the Des Moines River Valley and the Raccoon River Valley, the 160-mile (260 km) Central Iowa Bike Route connects Big Creek State Park, Springbrook State Park, and Ledges State Park. The Yale trailhead of the 90-mile (140 km) Raccoon River Valley Trail is 5 miles (8.0 km) east of Springbrook.

== 2013 sinkhole ==
On May 31, 2013, a large sinkhole, at least 20 feet wide by 5 feet deep, occurred along Iowa Highway 384 (160th Road in Guthrie County) under the asphalt to the entrance, which is near the boat ramp at the base of Mockingbird Hill. The Iowa Department of Natural Resources (DNR) contacted the Iowa Department of Transportation who deemed the sinkhole to be unsafe. The Iowa DNR immediately evacuated the campers at Springbrook. In the spring (March, April, and May) of 2013, according to Harry Hillaker, the state of Iowa climatologist, Iowa had the wettest May and the wettest spring on record. The record precipitation, both rainfall and snowfall, contributed to the formation of the sinkhole. On June 3, 2013, the RAGBRAI XLI route inspection pre-ride assessed the sinkhole for changes to the route through Springbrook and up Mockingbird Hill, which is the steepest hill to be on a RAGBRAI route; however, no changes to the 2013 RAGBRAI route were made.

== Springbrook Conservation Education Center ==
On March 13, 2017, the Springbrook Conservation Education Center will close to streamline educational programming within the Iowa Department of Natural Resources.
