= Trapper's Bay State Park =

State park in Iowa

- Location within Iowa Location within the United States
- Location: Dickinson County, Iowa, United States
- Coordinates: 43°27′16″N 95°19′54″W
- Area: 57 acres (23 ha)
- Elevation: 1,463 ft (446 m)
- Established: 1933
- Administrator: Iowa Department of Natural Resources
- Website: Official website
- Trappers Bay State Park Picnic Shelter
- U.S. National Register of Historic Places
- Area: less than one acre
- Built: 1933
- Architect: Central Design Office, Ames
- Architectural style: Rustic
- MPS: CCC Properties in Iowa State Parks MPS
- NRHP reference No.: 90001676
- Added to NRHP: November 15, 1990

Trapper's Bay State Park is located on the west side of Lake Park, Iowa, United States. The 57.5-acre (23.3 ha) park is along the north shore of Silver Lake. It provides space for picnicking, including a shelter listed on the National Register of Historic Places, and boating and fishing on the lake.

== History ==
Property for Trapper's Bay was acquired by the state in 1933. Civilian Conservation Corps Company 778 began park development sometime between the beginning of June and the end of October 1933 as part of their work with the National Forest Service. Work on the picnic shelter and the latrines was begun in 1933 and completed by March 1934 after they were transferred to the National Park Service. The park was put under the jurisdiction of Gull Point State Park in 1936.

== Picnic shelter ==
The Rustic style structure features back and side walls composed of random rubble stone. On the center of the back wall is a stone fireplace and chimney. Two round timber posts with bracing hold up the timber gable roof. Exposed purlins extend below the overhang of the roof. Located on a small point of land near the lake, the significance of its architecture is that it was designed to blend into its natural surroundings by means of its material, design, and workmanship.
