= Dolliver Memorial State Park =

State park in Webster County, Iowa

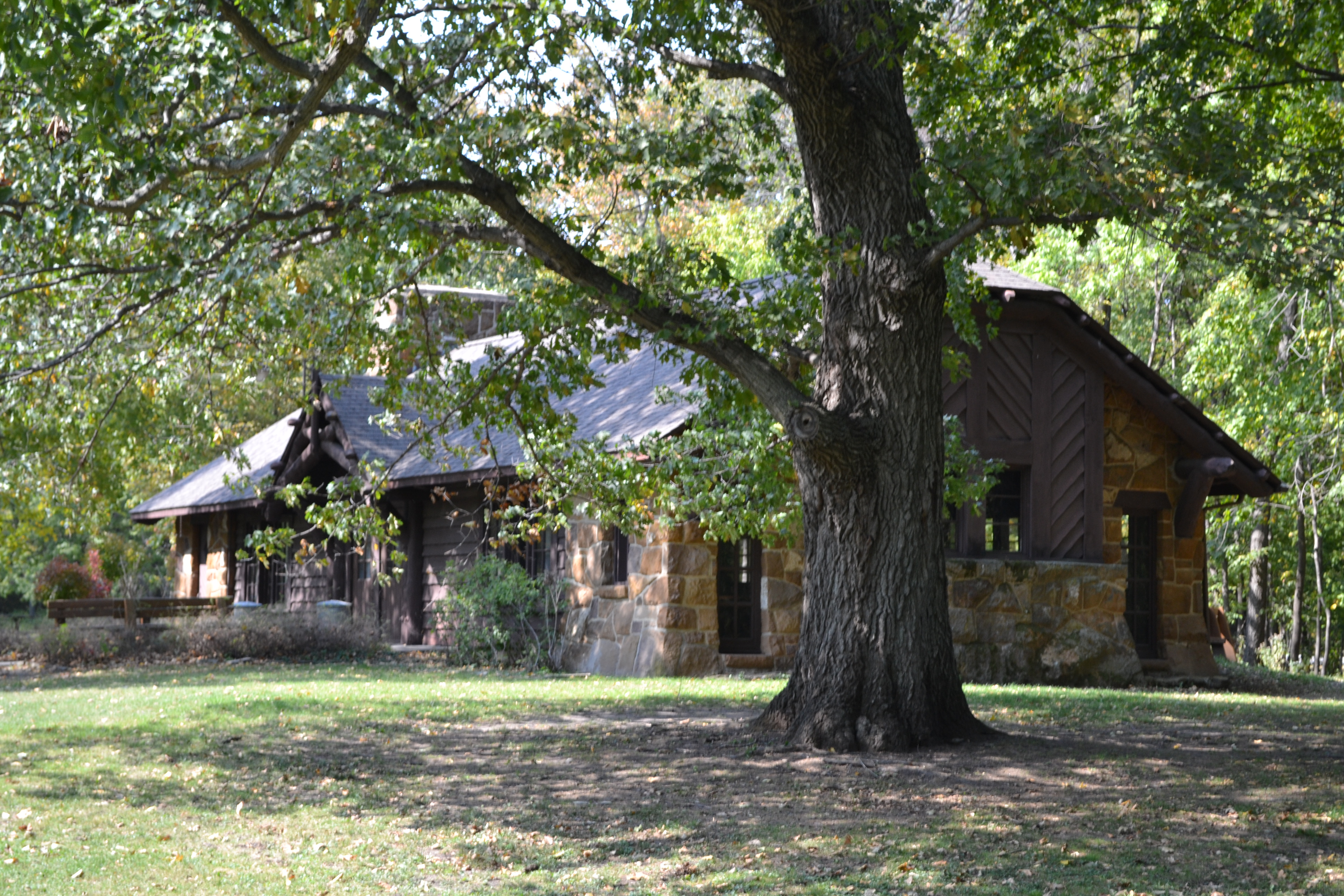
- Dolliver Memorial State Park's South Lodge

- Location within Iowa Location within the United States
- Location: Webster County, Iowa, United States
- Coordinates: 42°23′13″N 94°5′1″W
- Area: 594 acres (240 ha)
- Elevation: 1,005 ft (306 m)
- Established: 1925
- Administrator: Iowa Department of Natural Resources
- Named for: Jonathan P. Dolliver
- Website: Official website
- Dolliver Memorial State Park; Area A & Area B
- U.S. National Register of Historic Places
- U.S. Historic district
- Built: 1934-1935
- Built by: Civilian Conservation Corps
- Architect: Central Design Office, Ames
- Architectural style: Rustic
- MPS: CCC Properties in Iowa State Parks MPS
- NRHP reference No.: 90001684; 90001685
- Added to NRHP: November 15, 1990

Dolliver Memorial State Park is a public recreation area in Webster County, Iowa, United States, featuring high bluffs and deep ravines on the Des Moines River. The state park is located 10 miles (16 km) south of Fort Dodge and 3 miles (4.8 km) northwest of Lehigh. The park contains two listings on the National Register of Historic Places: Dolliver Memorial State Park, Entrance Area (Area A) and Dolliver Memorial State Park, Picnic, Hiking & Maintenance Area (Area B).

== Geography ==
Dolliver Memorial State Park is on the west bank of the Des Moines River at the mouth of a small tributary called Prairie Creek. The creek and a smaller tributary known as Boneyard Hollow have eroded canyons through a 100-foot (30 m) high bluff, exposing a cross section of sandstone deposited by a Paleozoic river.

The sandstone and other bedrock exposures in the park are some of the northernmost exposures of the lower Cherokee Group, rocks laid down during the Pennsylvanian Epoch.

Along Prairie Creek, a unique area known as the Copperas Beds is exposed. This is an iron-cemented pebble conglomerate. This rock is named for the copperas (iron sulfate) efflorescences that form on the rock face during dry weather and may be completely washed away by a heavy rain. Copperas is an ancient term. More recent studies of the efflorescence show that it is made of melanterite or rozenite, with some crystals of halotrichite and szomolnokite. Previous to their discovery here, most of these minerals had never been identified anywhere in Iowa.

== History ==
At the north end of the park is a narrow ravine named Boneyard Hollow. Early settlers found numerous bones of bison littering the ravine. It is thought that prehistoric Native Americans either stampeded bison into the ravine from a buffalo jump or herded them into the confined space from the riverbank, where they killed and butchered the animals. There are also several Indian mounds within the park.

In 1915 eleven-year-old Ruth Peterson discovered a lead tablet at the mouth of the creek outside Boneyard Hollow. The Latin inscription stated that the tablet had been left by explorers claiming the area for France in 1750, and mentioned Father Louis Hennepin by name. With the potential to rewrite European exploration of Iowa, the "Hennepin Plate" attracted a great deal of attention. Edgar Harlan, curator of the Iowa state archives, led an investigation. However the poor Latin and the fact that Hennepin had died in 1706 cast doubt on the tablet's authenticity. Ultimately two local boys admitted to making the tablet as a prank in 1913. As a result of the hoax, though, Harlan had become interested in the scenic area and helped spark public interest in preserving it as a state park. The property was purchased for $38,500 and dedicated in 1925 as Iowa's third state park, after Backbone and Ledges. Ruth Peterson died in 2004 at the age of 100, and in 2007 her son and other relatives donated the tablet to the Webster County Historical Society.

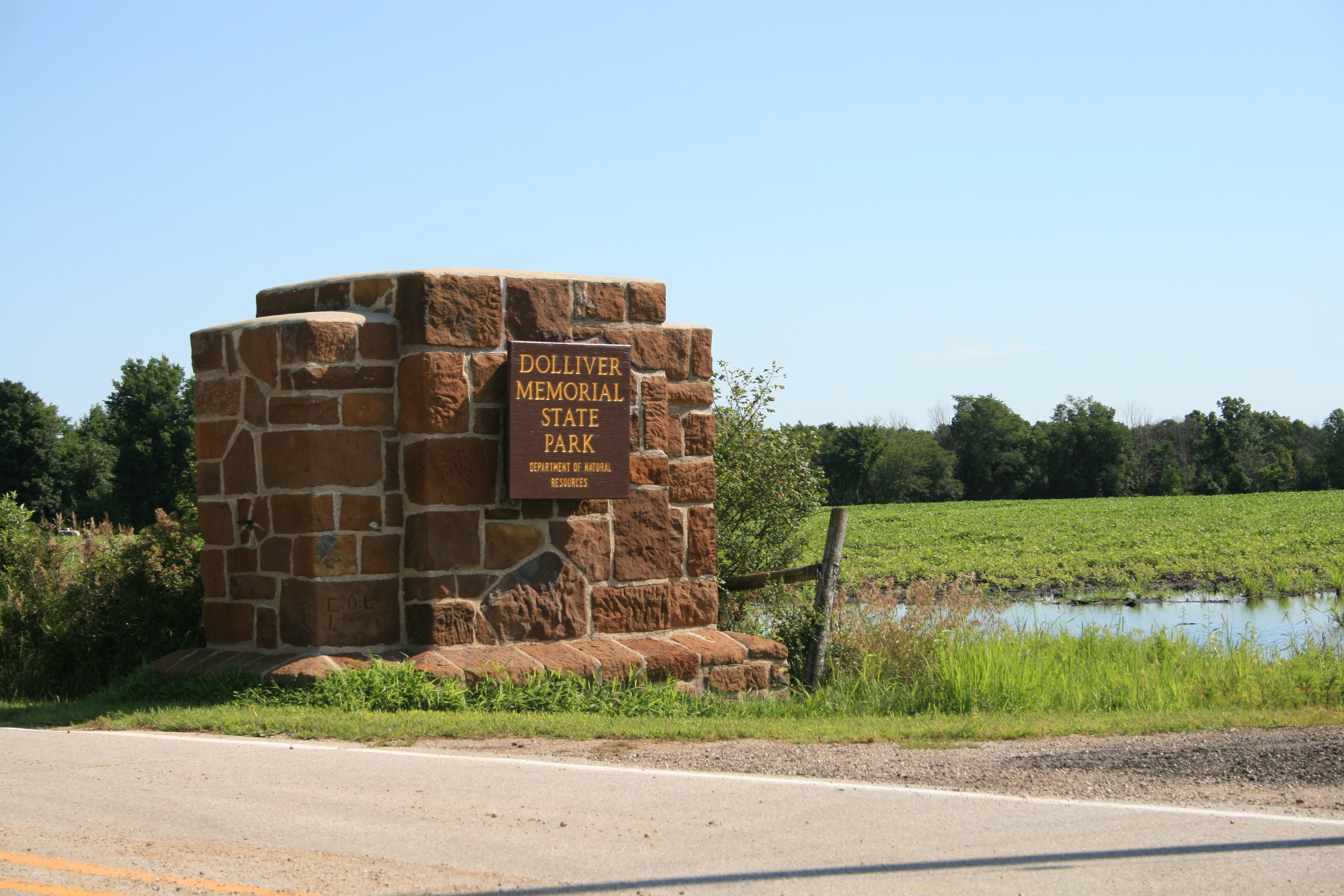
Stone monument built by the CCC at the south entrance to the park.

Two New Deal-era relief programs during the Great Depression developed many of the park's amenities. The Civilian Conservation Corps (CCC) had two companies that worked in the park between 1933 and 1935. The Works Progress Administration constructed the group camp from 1937 to 1938. The amenities completed by the CCC are the subjects of the two listings on the National Register of Historic Places. They completed the checking station and north entrance portals by the end of April 1934 and the south portals by May of the following year. The service building, which was the largest project built by the CCC in the park, was also completed in April 1934. The lodge, completed in November 1934, replaced an older structure. Its flagstone patio was finished in July 1935. A memorial to U.S. Senator Jonathan P. Dolliver, for whom the park is named, was completed in May 1935. Other projects completed by the CCC include a latrine, footbridges, culverts, stone steps along a hiking trail, the trail itself, and roads. The significance of the rustic architecture employed here, and designed by the Central Design Office in Ames, is that it was meant to blend into its natural surroundings by means of its material, design, and workmanship.

== Facilities ==
The campground features 33 sites, all with electrical hookups, plus 2 camper cabins, modern restrooms, showers, and a holding tank dump station. There is a separate group camp with a dining hall, restrooms, and showers. Two lodges built in the 1930s and an open picnic shelter can be rented for private events.

== Recreation ==
The park provides a boat ramp for river access. An interpretive trail follows Prairie Creek to the Copperas Beds and then leads up to the wooded blufftops.
