= Lake Ahquabi State Park =

State park in Warren County, Iowa

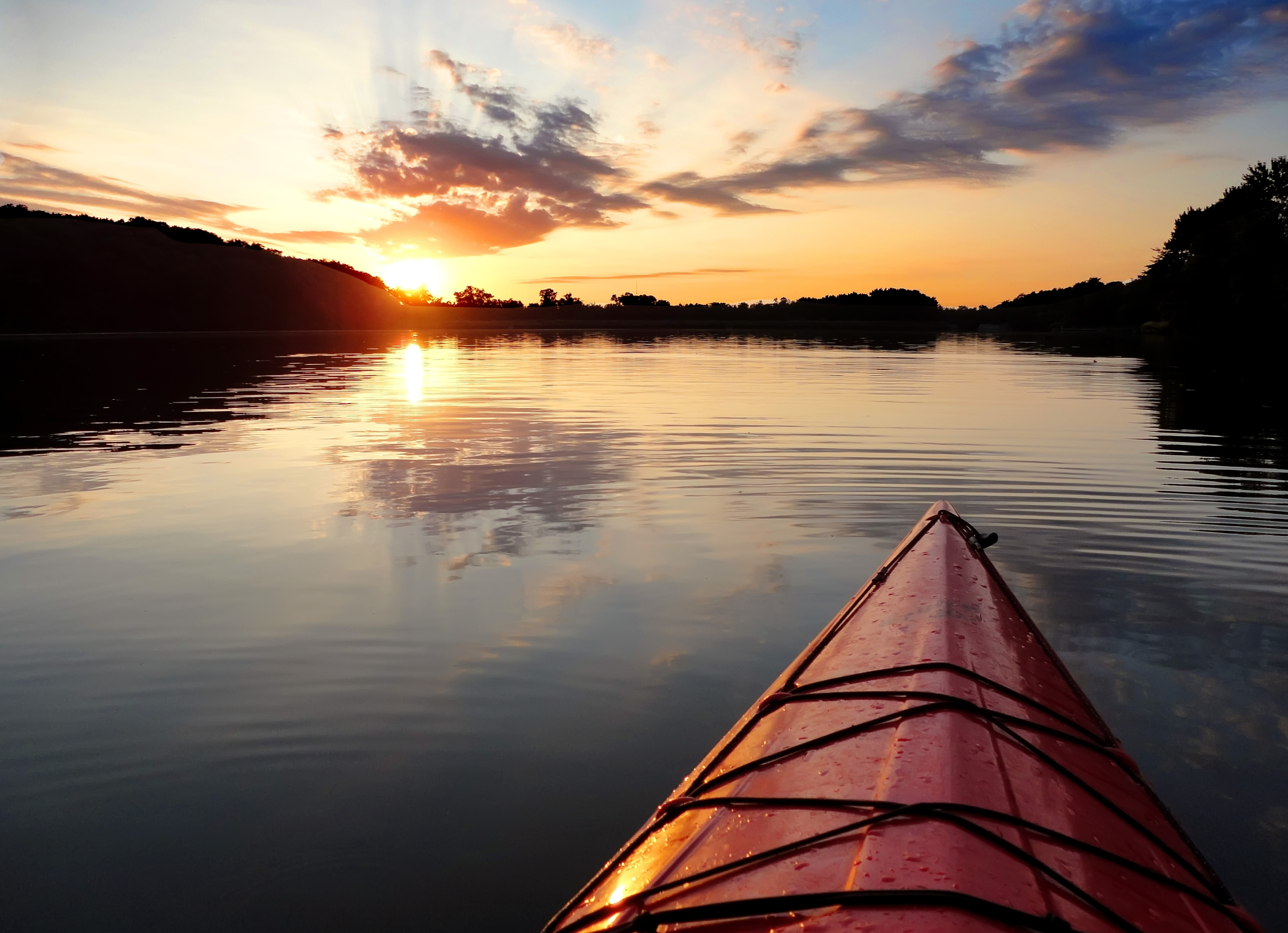
- Sunset on Lake Ahquabi by kayak

- Location within Iowa Location within the United States
- Location: Warren County, Iowa, United States
- Coordinates: 41°17′24″N 93°35′33″W
- Area: 770 acres (310 ha)
- Elevation: 860 ft (260 m)
- Established: 1936
- Administrator: Iowa Department of Natural Resources
- Website: Official website
- Lake Ahquabi State Park; Picnic Area (Area A); Bathhouse Area (Area B); Refectory Area (Area C)
- U.S. National Register of Historic Places
- U.S. Historic district
- Built: 1934-1934
- Built by: Civilian Conservation Corps
- Architectural style: Rustic
- MPS: CCC Properties in Iowa State Parks MPS
- NRHP reference No.: 90001663; 900016634; 90001665
- Added to NRHP: November 15, 1990

Lake Ahquabi State Park is a state park in Warren County, Iowa, United States, featuring a 115-acre (47 ha) reservoir. Ahquabi means "resting place" in the Fox language. The park is six miles (10 km) south of Indianola and 22 miles (35 km) south of Des Moines. Three sections of the park were listed on the National Register of Historic Places in 1991.

== History ==
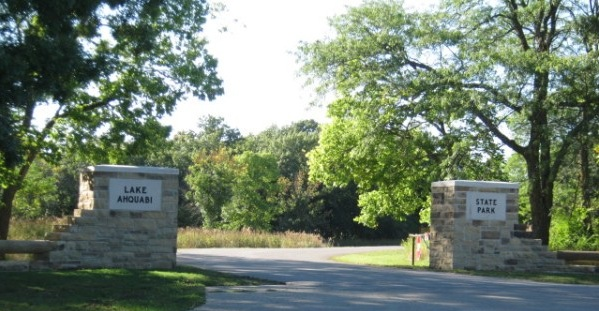
Entrance portals

The area was recommended for a state park site by J.N. "Ding" Darling. The city of Indianola acquired the first 560 acres (230 ha) in 1934, and it was known initially as Indianola State Park. From 1934 to 1937 Civilian Conservation Corps (CCC) Company 769 and a side camp built facilities in the park. They constructed the dam and reservoir from April 1934 to July 1935. However methods at the time did not consider long-term effects of the surrounding 3,321-acre (1,344 ha) watershed. By the 1980s sedimentation had shrunk the reservoir by 11 acres (4.5 ha) and agricultural pollutants in surface runoff had reduced the water quality. Various government and community organizations began working with neighboring landowners to improve Lake Ahquabi. Widespread adoption of soil conservation practices by local farmers and the development of buffer wetlands and sedimentation basins have halved the amount of sediments and nutrients reaching the lake. In the mid-1990s the lake was extensively dredged, the shoreline stabilized, the dam improved, and an aeration device installed. Game fish like largemouth bass, bluegill, sunfish, channel catfish, and crappie were stocked. After restoration Lake Ahquabi State Park's annual visitation and fishing use each increased three-fold. Anglers have been catching an average of 2.7 fish per hour, twice the catch rate of most Iowa lakes. It has been estimated that the money brought into the local economy by increased visitation equalled the $4 million spent on the restoration project within 2 years.

=== National Register of Historic Places ===
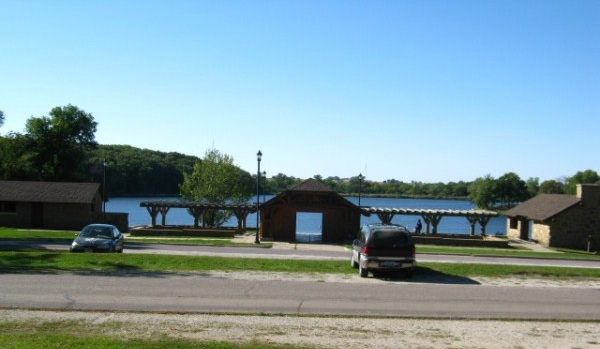
Beach Shelter Complex (Bathhouse Area B)

On November 15, 1990 three areas of the park were listed on the National Register of Historic Places. Their historic importance is derived from their association with the CCC. The park was part of a larger study of Iowa's state parks called the "Civilian Conservation Corps Properties in Iowa State Parks: 1933-1942". Area A focuses on a picnic area that includes the park's entrance portals, a picnic shelter, two latrines, three fountains, a footbridge, and the associated landscaping and trails. These facilities were built from December 1934 to April 1935. Area B includes the bathhouse, restroom, and concession. Company 769 began construction of these facilities in May 1935, and the side camp completed them by September 1937. Area C is the lodge or refectory. It was begun in July 1936 and completed in July 1937. The Rustic style was used in the design of the buildings. The significance of this architectural style is that it was designed to blend into its natural surroundings by means of its material, design, and workmanship. Areas A and B are historic districts, while Area C is an individual listing.

== Facilities ==
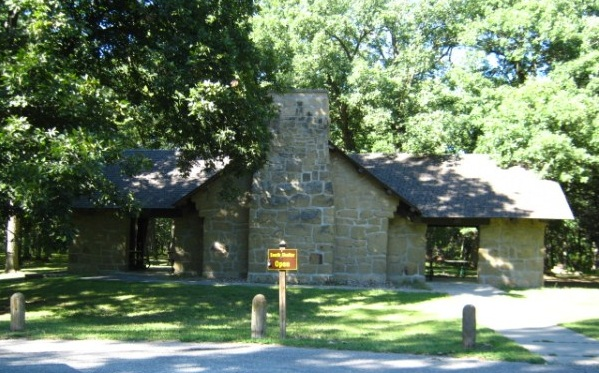
South Shelter (Picnic Area A)

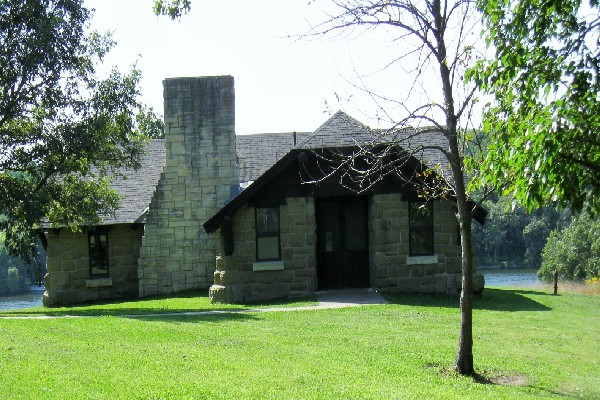
Refectory Area (Area C)

The lakeside campground offers 141 sites, 85 of which have electrical hookups, and a youth group camp area. There are modern restrooms and showers and two holding tank dump stations. A stone lodge built by the CCC and three open shelters can be reserved for private events.

== Recreation ==
Lake Ahquabi State Park includes a sandy beach and two boat ramps. A park concession rents canoes, kayaks, and paddleboats and sells food and bait. Jetties and an enclosed, handicap-accessible pier accommodate shoreline fishing. Circling Lake Ahquabi is a gravel trail which in winter is open to snowmobiling and cross-country skiing. Other trails wind through the woods that flank the reservoir.
