= Wanata State Park Picnic Shelter =

- U.S. National Register of Historic Places
- Location within Iowa Location within the United States
- Location: South of the junction of County Road M27 and Iowa Highway 10
- Nearest city: Peterson, Iowa
- Coordinates: 42°54′39″N 95°20′17″W
- Area: less than one acre
- Built: 1934
- Architect: Central Design Office, Ames
- MPS: CCC Properties in Iowa State Parks MPS
- NRHP reference No.: 90001677
- Added to NRHP: November 15, 1990

Wanata State Park Picnic Shelter is a historic building located south of Peterson, Iowa, United States. Dr. E.W. Spaulding from Peterson was instrumental in acquiring the property for the park, which was dedicated in 1934. Civilian Conservation Corps Company 778 built the shelter on the slope of a hill that descends to the Little Sioux River. The rear and side walls are composed of random rubble stone. There are four stone pillars across the front, and four vertical timbers attached to them that support the eaves of the gable roof. Each side wall has a doorway and window opening. A fireplace and chimney are centered on the rear wall. There is a small stone basement in the northwest corner, and cemented stone covers the floor of the shelter. It was listed on the National Register of Historic Places in 1990.
