= Yale, Iowa =

- City
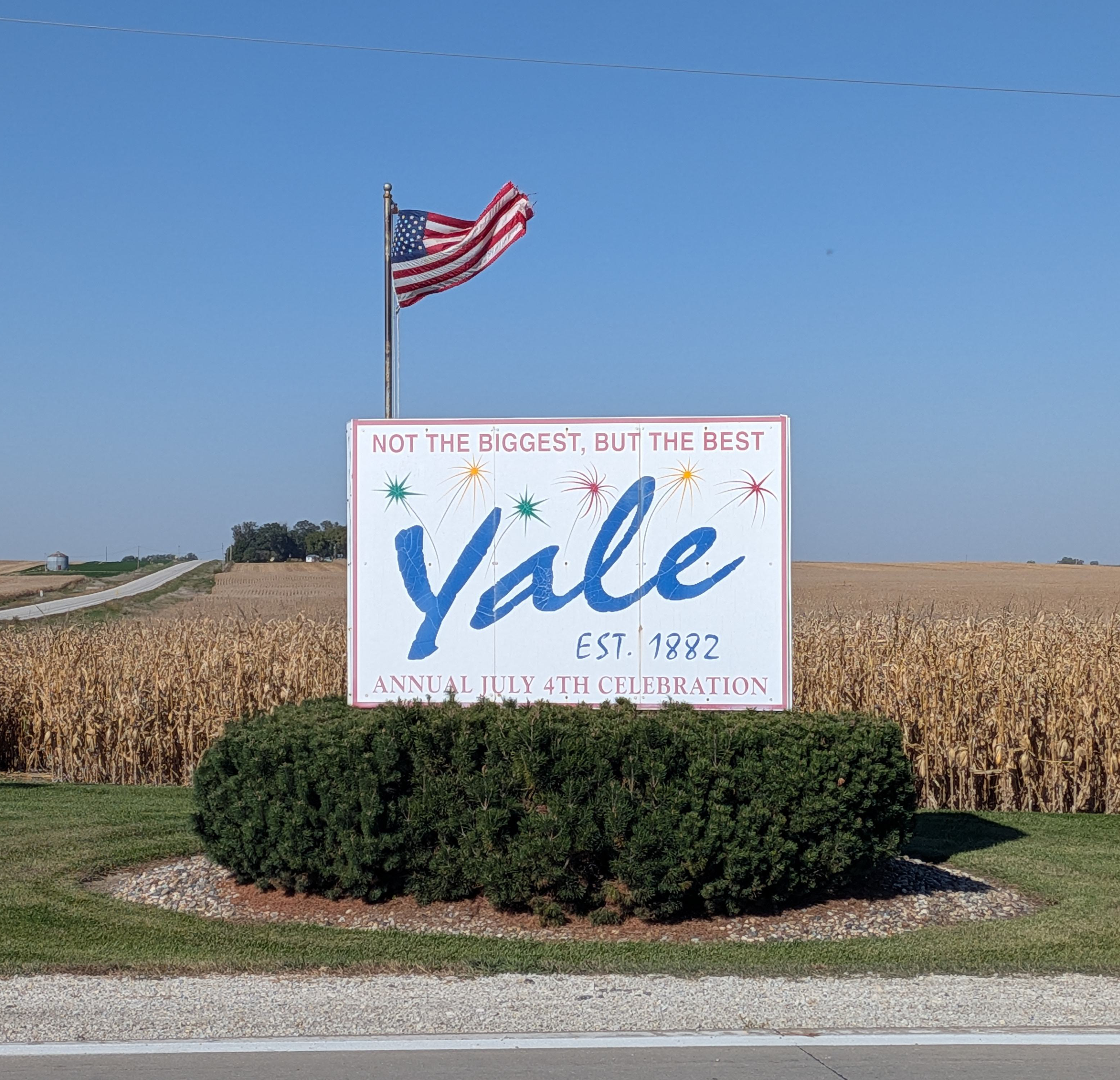
- Yale welcome sign
- Motto(s): "Not The Biggest, But The Best!"
- Location of Yale, Iowa
- Coordinates: 41°46′30″N 94°21′28″W
- Country: United States
- State: Iowa
- County: Guthrie
- Incorporated: November 27, 1901

Area
  - Total: 0.29 sq mi (0.75 km^{2})
  - Land: 0.29 sq mi (0.75 km^{2})
  - Water: 0 sq mi (0.00 km^{2})
- Elevation: 1,125 ft (343 m)

Population (2020)
  - Total: 267
  - Density: 924.0/sq mi (356.76/km^{2})
- Time zone: UTC-6 (Central (CST))
  - Summer (DST): UTC-5 (CDT)
- ZIP code: 50277
- Area code: 641
- FIPS code: 19-87285
- GNIS feature ID: 2397390
- Website: www.yaleiowa.com

Yale is a city in Guthrie County, Iowa, United States. The population was 267 in the 2020 census, a decline from 287 in 2000. It is part of the Des Moines–West Des Moines Metropolitan Statistical Area.

== History ==
Yale was platted in 1882. It was named for its founder, Milo Yale.

In 1932, the Yale High School Gymnasium was built. The round building has fallen into disuse, but is listed on the National Register of Historic Places.

== Geography ==
According to the United States Census Bureau, the city has a total area of 0.27 square miles (0.70 km^{2}), all land.

== Demographics ==
Historical population
Census	Pop.	Note	%±
1910	273		—
1920	276		1.1%
1930	304		10.1%
1940	287		−5.6%
1950	293		2.1%
1960	260		−11.3%
1970	301		15.8%
1980	299		−0.7%
1990	220		−26.4%
2000	287		30.5%
2010	246		−14.3%
2020	267		8.5%
U.S. Decennial Census

=== 2020 census ===
As of the 2020 Census, the total population was 267 people. The population density was 381 people per square mile, spread over 0.7 miles. Of those 267 people, the median age was 37.5 years, with 39.9% of the town's population under the age of 18, 50.6% between the ages of 18 and 64, and 9.5% of the population over the age of 65. There were a total of 137 households, with an average of 2 people per household.

53% of the town's population was male, with 47% of the population female. The racial makeup of the town was 95.13% White, less than 1% African American, 4.11% mixed race, and 3.37% Hispanic.

The average income per capita of Yale was $29,327 which is lower than the state average, and the median household income was $57,292, 10% lower than the rest of the state. Only 1.9% of the town's population lives under the poverty line, which is far lower than the rest of the state.

41.6% of the population of the town is identified as currently married.

95.1% of the Yale population has received a high school degree, which is 2.6 percentage points higher than the rest of the state. Although Yale has a lower-than-average percentage of the population having received college degrees, with only 7.3% of the town's population have received college degrees compared to the state average of 30.5%.

12.5% of the town's population were veterans.

=== 2010 census ===
As of the census of 2010, there were 246 people, 113 households, and 68 families living in the city. The population density was 901.1 inhabitants per square mile (347.9/km^{2}). There were 129 housing units at an average density of 472.5 per square mile (182.4/km^{2}). The racial makeup of the city was 98.8% White, 0.4% African American, 0.4% Native American, and 0.4% from two or more races.

There were 113 households, of which 30.1% had children under the age of 18 living with them, 46.9% were married couples living together, 10.6% had a female householder with no husband present, 2.7% had a male householder with no wife present, and 39.8% were non-families. 38.9% of all households were made up of individuals, and 22.1% had someone living alone who was 65 years of age or older. The average household size was 2.18 and the average family size was 2.88.

The median age in the city was 45 years. 25.2% of residents were under the age of 18; 4.4% were between the ages of 18 and 24; 20.4% were from 25 to 44; 25.2% were from 45 to 64; and 24.8% were 65 years of age or older. The gender makeup of the city was 45.9% male and 54.1% female.

=== 2000 census ===
As of the census of 2000, there were 287 people, 125 households, and 75 families living in the city. The population density was 969.8 inhabitants per square mile (374.4/km^{2}). There were 130 housing units at an average density of 439.3 per square mile (169.6/km^{2}). The racial makeup of the city was 99.65% White, and 0.35% from two or more races.

There were 125 households, out of which 31.2% had children under the age of 18 living with them, 48.8% were married couples living together, 8.0% had a female householder with no husband present, and 39.2% were non-families. 35.2% of all households were made up of individuals, and 20.8% had someone living alone who was 65 years of age or older. The average household size was 2.30 and the average family size was 3.05.

In the city, the population was spread out, with 27.9% under the age of 18, 6.6% from 18 to 24, 25.8% from 25 to 44, 22.0% from 45 to 64, and 17.8% who were 65 years of age or older. The median age was 38 years. For every 100 females, there were 90.1 males. For every 100 females age 18 and over, there were 81.6 males.

The median income for a household in the city was $32,875, and the median income for a family was $36,806. Males had a median income of $29,375 versus $17,813 for females. The per capita income for the city was $12,789. About 9.1% of families and 11.1% of the population were below the poverty line, including 11.2% of those under the age of eighteen and 13.3% of those 65 or over.

== Arts and culture ==
=== Festivals ===
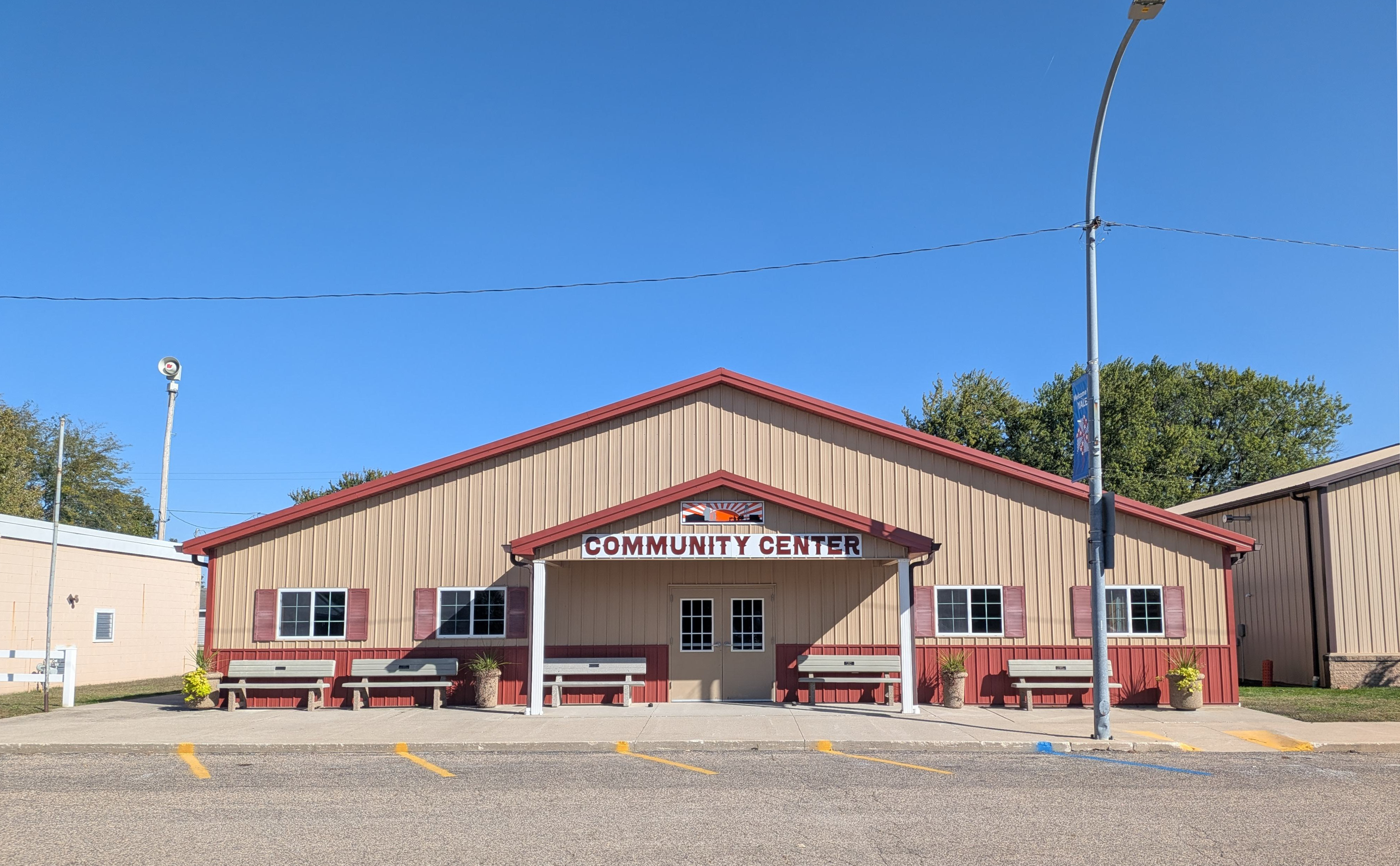
Yale Community Center

Annually, Yale hosts a Fourth of July festival, which includes a street dance or a local band that plays at the Yale Community Club on the night of the Third of July. On the Fourth of July the town parade kicks off the events starting at 11:00 a.m. Throughout the day in Yale on the Fourth of July there are many family friendly events going on. The Yale Saddle Club puts on a horse show on the south end of town near the park. In the vacant lot south of old round gym and directly east of the baseball field Yale puts on a garden tractor contest. Throughout the day most events are held on main street to include street venders, a car show, a talent show, bingo, and many others. To close the day's events when it gets dark enough in the evening the Farmers State Bank and the City of Yale sponsor a fireworks display. Yale's population doubles if not triples during the day of the Fourth of July.

== Government ==
Steve Stanton was reelected as mayor of Yale in 2011 and 2015 and served until 2019.

== Education ==
Panorama Community School District serves the community. The district formed on July 1, 1989, as a merger of the Panora-Linden and Y-J-B school districts.

== See also ==
- Springbrook State Park
- Raccoon River Valley Trail
- Lemonade Ride
- Yale High School Gymnasium
