= Squirrel Hollow Park =

- Squirrel Hollow County Park; Historic District
- U.S. National Register of Historic Places
- U.S. Historic district
- Location within Iowa Location within the United States
- Location: Eastern bank of the North Raccoon River southeast of Jefferson
- Coordinates: 41°57′07″N 94°17′16″W
- Area: 60 acres (24 ha)
- Built: 1934-1936
- Built by: Civil Works Administration; Public Works Administration; Works Progress Administration
- Architect: Central Design Office, Iowa State College
- MPS: Conservation Movement in Iowa MPS
- NRHP reference No.: 91001835
- Added to NRHP: December 23, 1991

Squirrel Hollow County Park is located along the North Raccoon River southeast of Jefferson, Iowa, United States. It was established in 1934, and it is the second oldest county park in the state of Iowa. The 60-acre (24 ha) park is bordered on two sides by a 147-acre (59 ha) wildlife management area. Both are managed by the Greene County Conservation Board. They are open from April 1 to November 1 and feature facilities for camping, fishing, canoeing, kayaking, hiking, picnicking, and equestrian camping and trails. The park was listed as a historic district on the National Register of Historic Places in 1991.

== Historic district ==
Ten park structures are included in the historic district, of which three are contributing buildings and seven are contributing structures. They were designed by the Central Design Office at Iowa State College, now Iowa State University, and built by the Civil Works Administration, Works Progress Administration, and the Public Works Administration between 1934 and 1936. The three buildings are a shelter house and two latrines. The 36 by 20.5 feet (11.0 by 6.2 m) shelter house features old mill stones in the center of the concrete floor. The structures include two fireplaces located east of the shelter house, the stone retaining wall on the east bank of the Raccoon River, two entrance portals along the county access road, a ball diamond, and the gravel road system.
