= Geode State Park =

State park in Iowa, United States

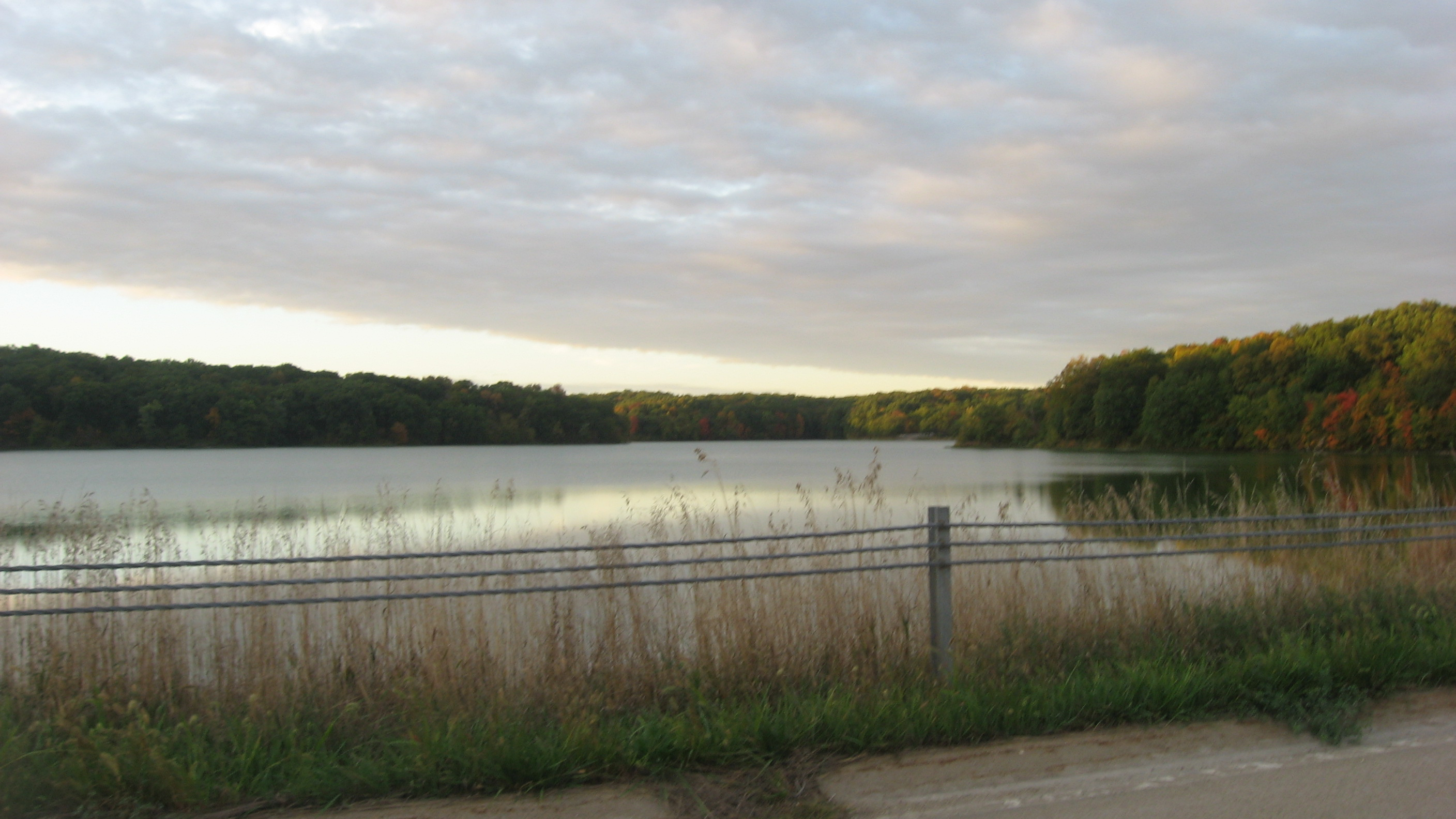
- Lake Geode

- Location within Iowa Location within the United States
- Type: Iowa State Park
- Location: Henry County, Iowa, United States
- Coordinates: 40°49′11″N 91°23′17″W
- Area: 1,640 acres (660 ha)
- Elevation: 591 ft (180 m)
- Created: 1937
- Etymology: Named for a large geode found there
- Administrator: Iowa Department of Natural Resources
- Website: Official website
- Geode State Park, Civilian Conservation Corps Area
- U.S. National Register of Historic Places
- U.S. Historic district
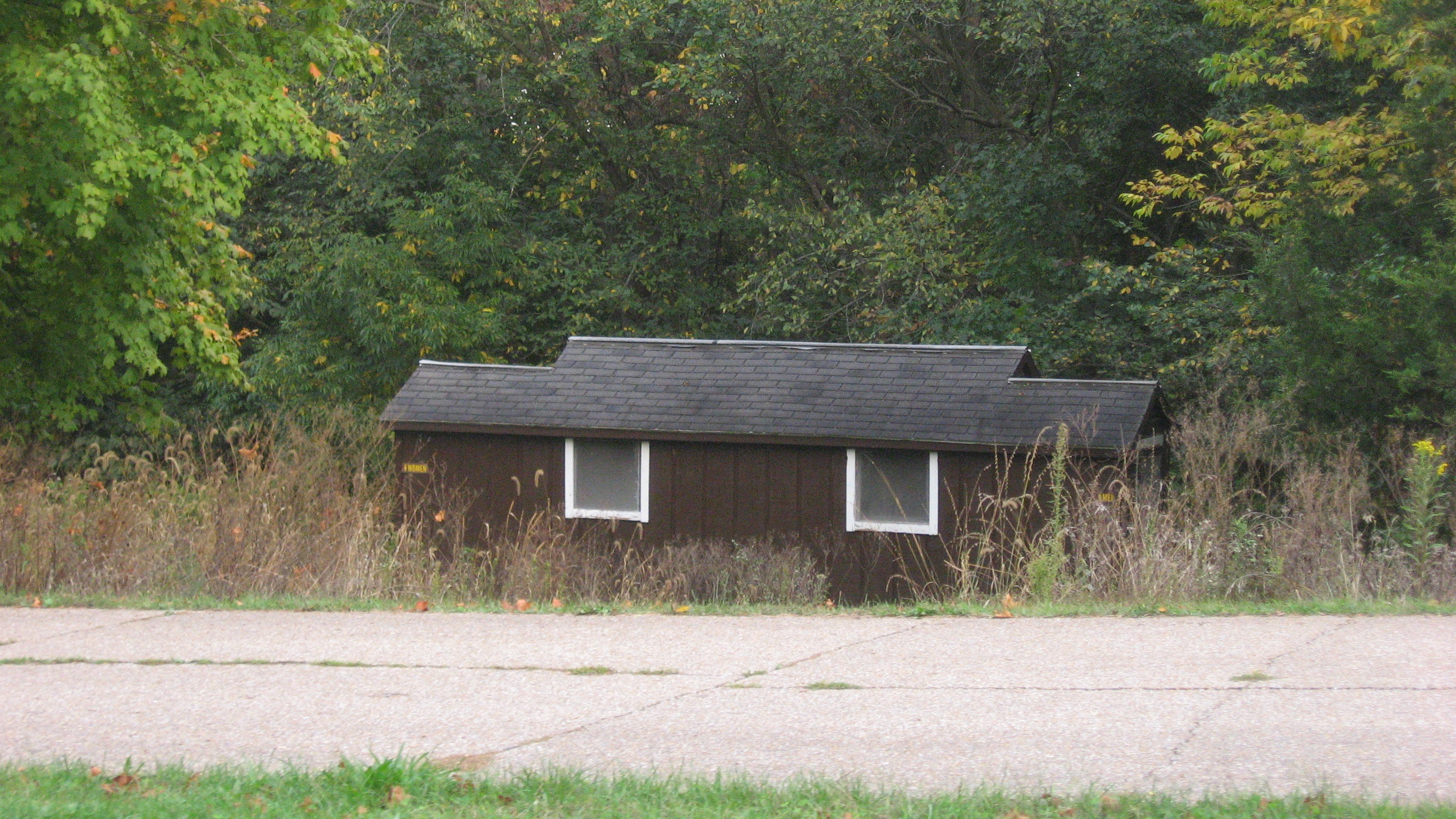
- Built: 1939
- Built by: Civilian Conservation Corps
- Architect: Central Design Office, Ames
- MPS: CCC Properties in Iowa State Parks MPS
- NRHP reference No.: 90001673
- Added to NRHP: November 15, 1990

Geode State Park is a state park in Henry County, Iowa bordering Des Moines County. It is managed by the Iowa Department of Natural Resources. While it is named for Iowa's state rock, the geode, few can be found in the park. A display of geodes, with their mysterious crystal formations in their hollow cavities, can be seen at the park office. It is illegal to remove geodes from state parks.

The prime attraction of the 1,640-acre (660 ha) park is Lake Geode, a 187-acre (76 ha) lake built in 1950. Over the years, the lake has become well known for excellent fishing for largemouth bass, bluegill, crappie, channel catfish, bullhead, red-eared sunfish.

Geode State Park joined the Iowa park system in 1937. The spot along the Skunk River had long been a local picnicking spot. Originally local groups raised $4,800 to purchase 143 acres (58 ha). The Civilian Conservation Corps moved onto the grounds to begin clearing trees, creating roads and building structures. In 1947, civilian construction workers returned and building resumed. In 1951, the lake, beach and CCC-reminiscent beach house were dedicated. Also opened at the time was an airstrip, making Geode the only park that invited travelers to arrive by private plane. The strip has been closed since.

On Saturday, July 25, 2009, a RAGBRAI participant, Donald D. Myers from Rolla, Missouri, died from injuries sustained in a crash at the bottom of the hill near Geode Lake dam at Geode State Park.

Some places in the area have been reported to have timber rattlesnakes.

Nearby towns are Burlington, 15 miles (24 km) to the east; New London, 6 miles (9.7 km) north; Danville, 6 miles (9.7 km) northeast; Middletown, 6 miles (9.7 km) east; and Lowell, at the park's southwest corner.

The park can be reached from Middletown on Iowa 79 or from Lowell on County Road J-20.
