= Yale High School Gymnasium =

Historic building in Yale, Iowa, USA

- U.S. National Register of Historic Places
- Location within Iowa Location within the United States
- Location: 414 Lincoln St. Yale, Iowa
- Coordinates: 41°46′27.9″N 94°21′25.8″W
- Area: less than one acre
- Built: 1932
- Architect: Halver R. Straight
- NRHP reference No.: 100003261
- Added to NRHP: December 28, 2018

The Yale High School Gymnasium is a historic building located in Yale, Iowa, United States. Completed in 1932, it was the first round gymnasium built in the state of Iowa. It was designed by Halver R. Straight, a mechanical engineer whose primary work was in the ceramics industry with the construction of silos, and this building is similarly constructed with clay tiles. The gymnasium served the local high school basketball teams until 1961 when it was consolidated with the schools in Jamaica and Bagley. From then until 1989 it was used for the elementary school's physical education classes. It was then open for use by the local community. Through the years the building also hosted band concerts, commencements, plays, banquets, and a game by the Harlem Globetrotters. The circumference of the structure measures 242 feet (74 m). The interior building features a small court that measures 65 by 30 feet (19.8 by 9.1 m), a stage, and bleachers. Its design was impractical as the court was adjacent with the block walls. The building was listed on the National Register of Historic Places in 2018.
