= Gull Point State Park =

State park in Dickinson County, Iowa

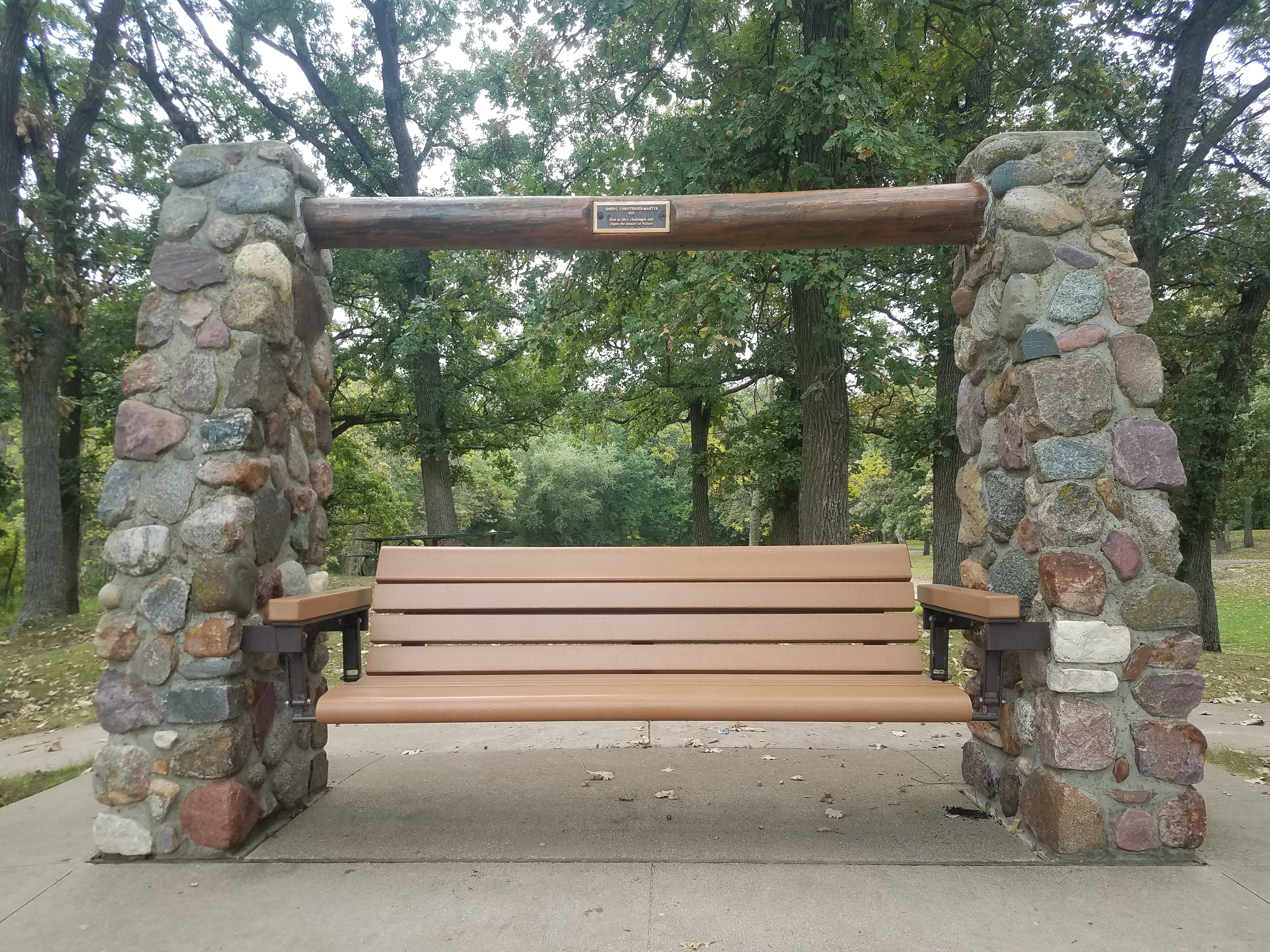
- Sheryl Christensen-Martyr swing

- Location within Iowa Location within the United States
- Location: Dickinson County, Iowa, United States
- Coordinates: 43°22′15″N 95°09′32″W
- Area: 380 acres (150 ha)
- Elevation: 1,398 ft (426 m)
- Established: 1933
- Administrator: Iowa Department of Natural Resources
- Website: Official website
- Gull Point State Park, Area A
- U.S. National Register of Historic Places
- U.S. Historic district
- Built: 1934-1935
- Built by: Civilian Conservation Corps
- Architect: Central Design Office, Ames
- Architectural style: Rustic
- MPS: CCC Properties in Iowa State Parks MPS
- NRHP reference No.: 90001661<
- Gull Point State Park, Area B
- U.S. National Register of Historic Places
- U.S. Historic district
- Built: 1934-1935
- Built by: Civilian Conservation Corps
- Architect: Central Design Office, Ames
- Architectural style: Rustic
- MPS: CCC Properties in Iowa State Parks MPS
- NRHP reference No.: 90001662
- Added to NRHP: November 15, 1990

Gull Point State Park is a state park of Iowa, United States, located on West Okoboji Lake in the city of Wahpeton. It is the primary state park unit in the Iowa Great Lakes region. Two areas of the park were listed as nationally recognized historic districts on the National Register of Historic Places in 1990.

== History ==
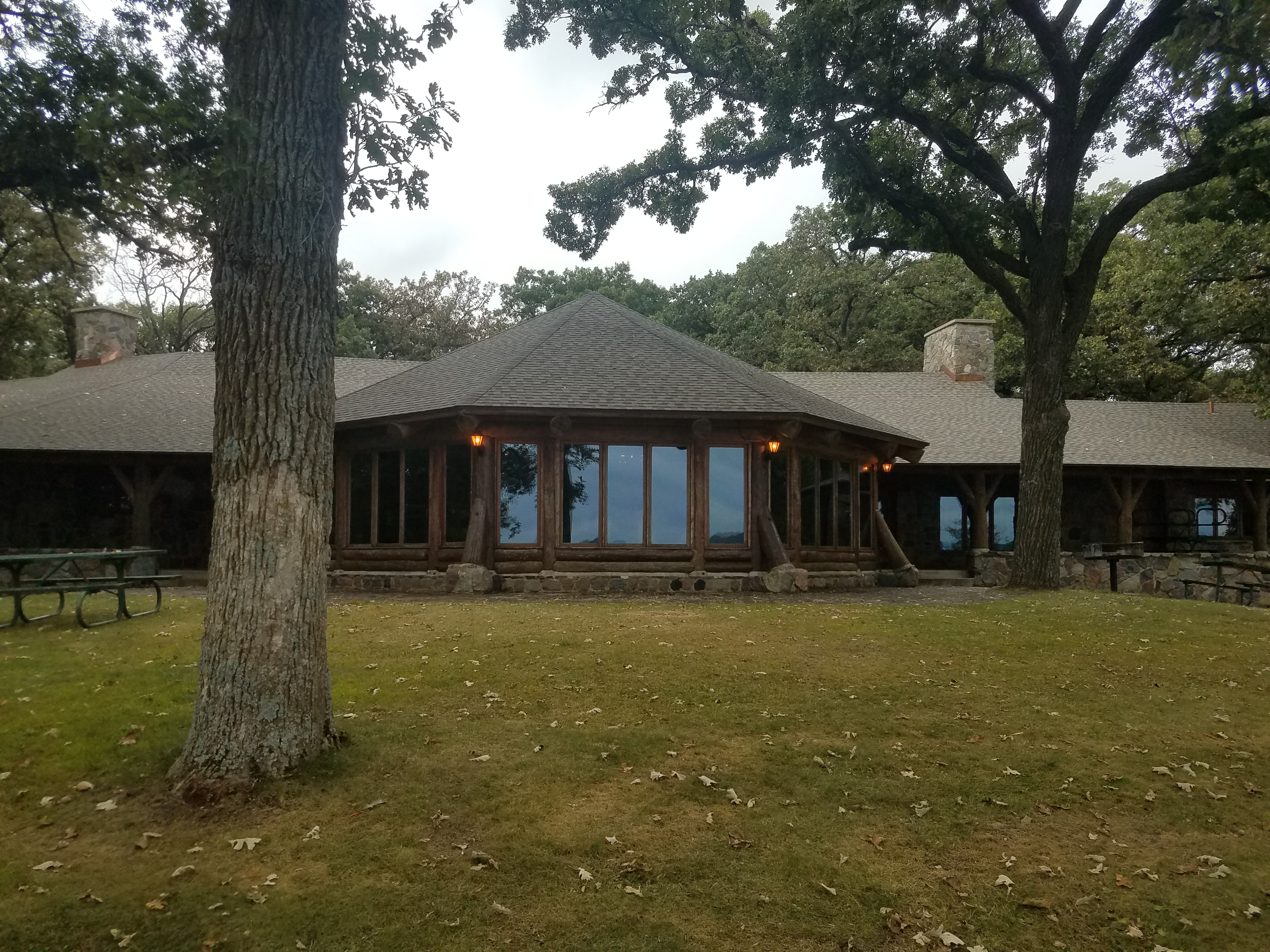
Lodge

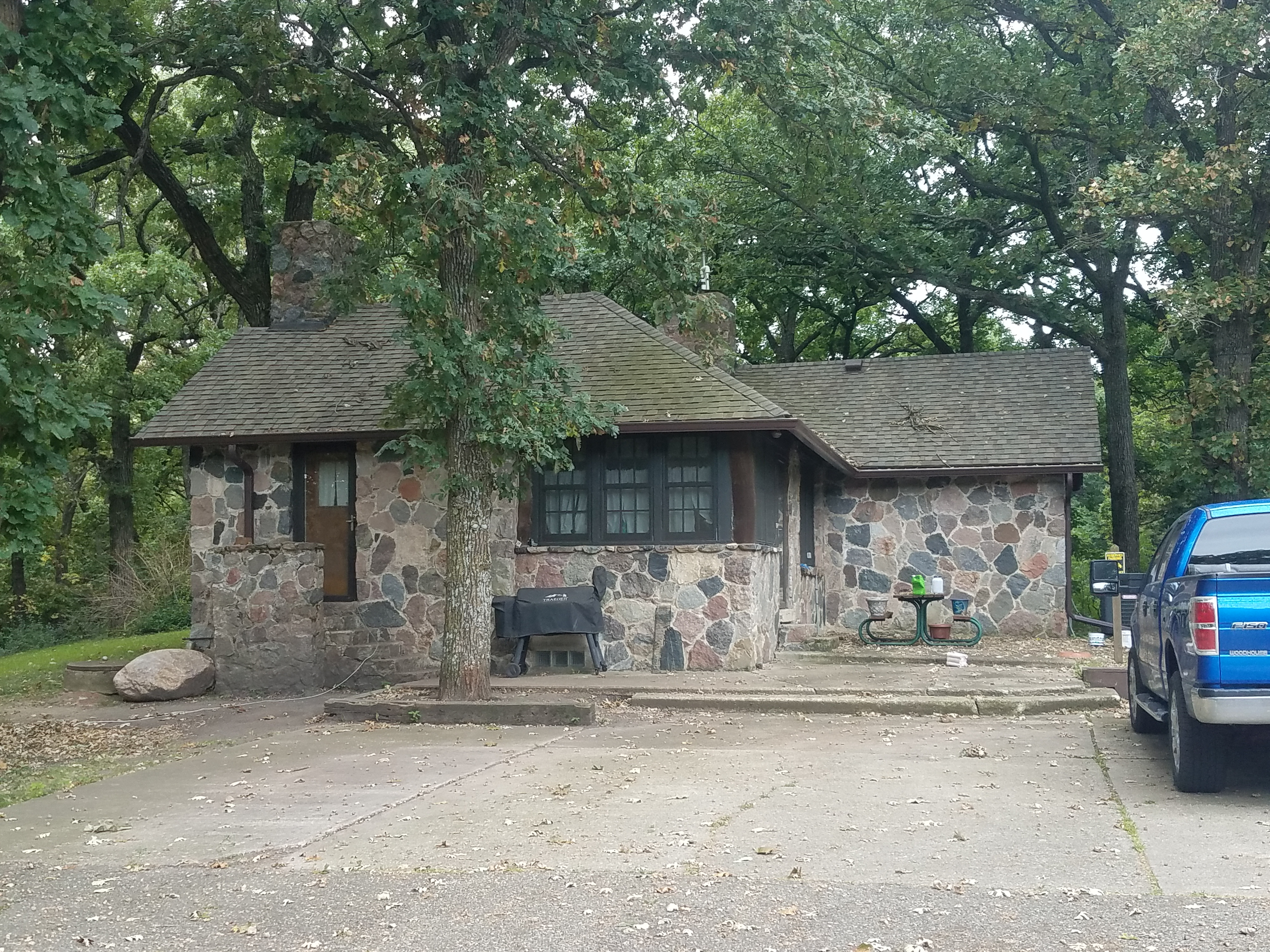
Custodian's residence

The Civilian Conservation Corps (CCC) Company 778 worked at Gull Point from 1934 to 1935. The significance of the architecture used by the CCC is that it was designed to blend into its natural surroundings by means of its material, design, and workmanship.

There are two buildings that make up "Area A" on the National Register: the lodge and the boathouse. The CCC started construction on the lodge by July 1934 and it was finished in April 1935. It is an irregularly shaped building composed of rubble sandstone built on a concrete foundation. The lodge is capped with an intersecting gable roof. Overlooking the lake is a three-sided bay covered by a pyramid roof. The boathouse was begun on September 24, 1934, and completed by February 1935. It is a rectangular building with hexagonal tower on its northeast corner. Like the lodge, it is composed of rubble sandstone and built on a concrete foundation. The boathouse has space for 30 boats and the custodian's office. The two-story tower is open on the top floor and enclosed on the lower floor.

"Area B" on the National Register includes the custodian's residence, service building, and west entrance gates. Construction on the residence was begun by September 1934, and it was completed by May 1935. Built over a basement, it is an L-shaped building composed of random rubble and capped with an intersecting gable roof. The house includes two bedrooms, bath, living and dining room, and a kitchen. The service building was begun by October 1934 and completed in March 1935. It is a single-story rectangular structure. Like the residence, it is composed of random rubble and capped with a gable roof. It features a two-stall garage on the north end and an office on the south. Construction on the west entrance gates had to be delayed because there was a lack of building stone. While they were 25% complete by February 1935, their completion date is unclear. There are four entrance pillars composed of split sandstone boulders that mark the entrance. One set of pillars measure 11 by 4 feet (3.4 by 1.2 m), while the other set measures 11 by 8 feet (3.4 by 2.4 m). The wooden gates are not original.

In 1974, the Iowa Conservation Commission (now the Iowa Department of Natural Resources) purchased nearby land which had belonged to the Prairie Gold Boy Scout Council since 1949. Before then, the land had been used as a golf course. Employed by the Boy Scouts, Barney Peterson worked to preserve this land for future generations. To honor him, this land was named the Barney Peterson Nature Trail. The approximately 1.5 mile trail runs past several structures from the land's past, including an old chapel used by the boy scouts and a golf tee box.

== Facilities ==
The park features the largest lodge in Iowa to have been built by the CCC in the 1930s. Seating up to 140 people, it can be rented for private events. Several open picnic shelters are also available. The shaded campground, one of the most popular in the area, has 112 sites, over half with electrical hookups. Other campground facilities include modern restrooms and showers, a holding tank dump station, and a playground.

== Recreation ==
Gull Point State Park provides numerous opportunities for water recreation, from a beach and boat ramp to fishing. The western half of the park features nature trails and, in winter, cross-country skiing.

== Geology ==
Gull Point, which is not a part of the State Park, occupies a peninsula on the west shore of West Okoboji Lake, Iowa's deepest natural lake, jutting out between Miller's Bay and Emerson's Bay. The area's lakes, wetlands, and sloughs interspersed with knobby hills are a kettle-and-kame landscape created during the last glacial period. The region was impacted by continental glaciers advancing and retreating between 13,500 and 12,000 years ago. Interconnected sloughs were created by runoff channels and hills by piles of rock debris. Many of the lakes and wetlands formed around blocks of ice left embedded in the ground as glaciers melted back. The shores of Gull Point are strewn with glacial erratics, igneous and metamorphic boulders from far to the north that were carried and dropped by the ice.

== Controversy ==
A tradition has developed of young adults gathering for a massive party on the Gull Point State Park beach during the 4th of July holiday. With crowds of several thousand packed onto the small beach, many individuals wind up standing in the water up to waist-deep. This has raised safety concerns, compounded by binge drinking and risky activities. Underage drinking, public indecency, nudity, and sexual assault have become issues. While hard liquor is banned in Iowa state parks, beer and wine are not. In 2010 the state government considered a ban on all alcohol on the 4th of July and adjacent weekends for Gull Point and nearby parks, soliciting public comment. Ultimately a governor-appointed commission within the Iowa Department of Natural Resources narrowly voted down the ban 4–3. Instead the multi-agency law enforcement presence has been increased, coupled with a parking ban on the entrance road to ensure access for emergency vehicles. According to the State Parks Division, the heavy visitation and drinking issues have not extended to state parks outside the Iowa Great Lakes region.
