= Spirit Lake Massacre Log Cabin =

Historic house in Iowa, United States

- U.S. National Register of Historic Places
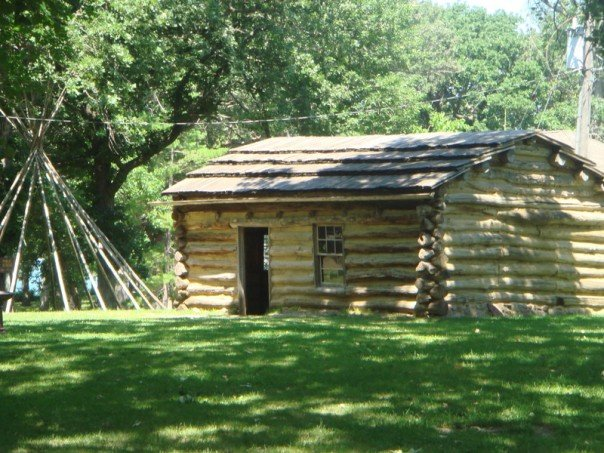

- Location within Iowa Location within the United States
- Location: West of Estherville on U.S. Route 71; Arnolds Park, Iowa
- Coordinates: 43°21′56″N 95°08′26″W
- Area: less than one acre
- Built: 1856
- NRHP reference No.: 73000724
- Added to NRHP: April 3, 1973

The Spirit Lake Massacre Log Cabin, also known as the Gardner Log Cabin, is located in Arnolds Park, Iowa, United States. Rowland Gardner had led a group of settlers into the region in 1856, and he built this cabin in July of that year. On March 8, 1857, a band of renegade Wahpekuta Sioux who had been alienated from the tribal structure attacked the Gardner family and other settlers in the immediate area in an incident known as the Spirit Lake Massacre. Led by Inkpaduta, the band of outlaws raided both Indians and white settlers for a period of about 30 years.

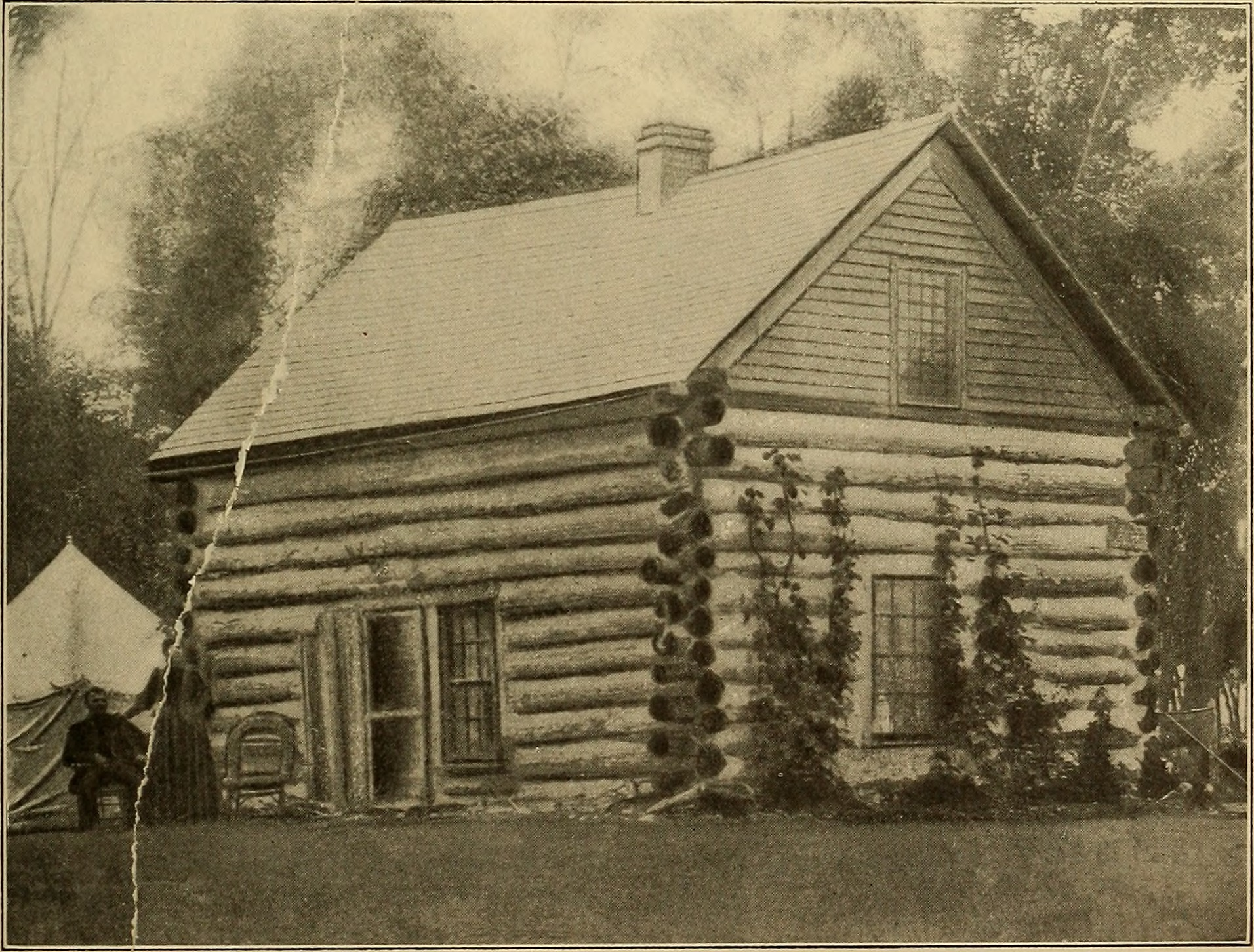
The cabin in 1885

The massacre accelerated the U.S. government's removal of the remaining Sioux from Iowa and Minnesota, and it slowed the rate of settlement in the region for a period of time. The raid actually began in another cabin, but this cabin gained notoriety because Gardner's 13-year-old daughter Abagail survived the attack, was taken captive, and was later ransomed by the Yankton Sioux. Abbie Gardner-Sharp published an account of the massacre, and was able to gain possession of the cabin that she ran as a museum. The state erected a monument to the victims near the cabin in 1895. After Gardner-Sharp died in 1921 the state of Iowa acquired the property and the state historical society continues to operate the cabin as a museum. The cabin was a setting of MacKinlay Kantor's novel Spirit Lake (1961). It was listed on the National Register of Historic Places in 1973.
