= Dump station =

A dump station is a place where raw sewage may be entered into a sanitary sewer system in a safe and responsible way. Dump stations are often used by owners of motorhomes, campervans, recreational vehicles or boats that are equipped with toilet facilities and a sewage holding tank, also known as a blackwater holding tank. The holding tank can be safely emptied at a dump station. Greywater holding tanks can also be emptied at a dump station.

Dump stations are often located at campgrounds, RV parks, truck stops, RV storage facilities, highway rest areas, recreation vehicle dealerships, marinas and other places that are frequented by recreational vehicles and boats. Dump station owners may charge a fee for use, or offer them as a free public service.

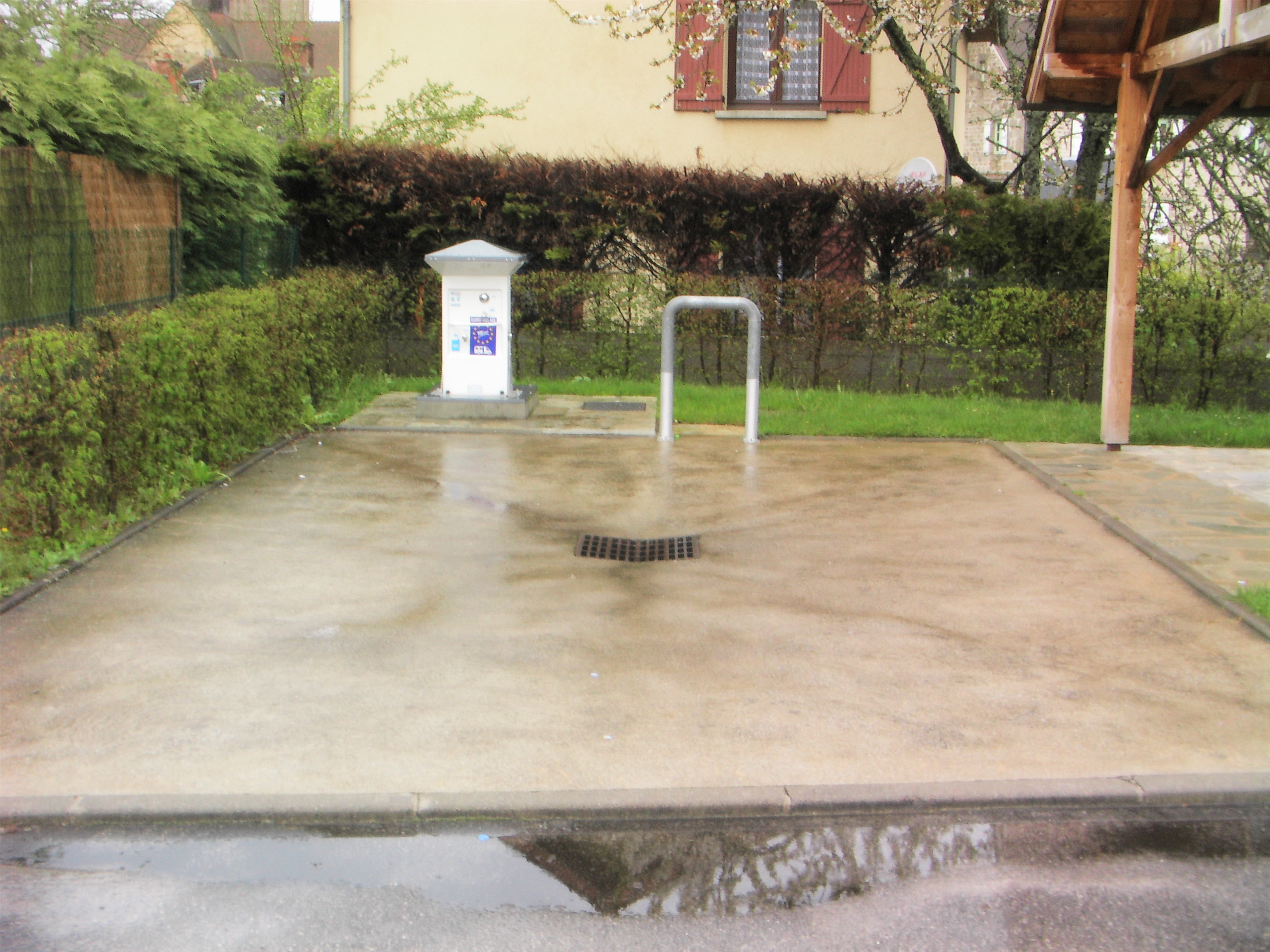
A typical area for motorhome in Felletin, France

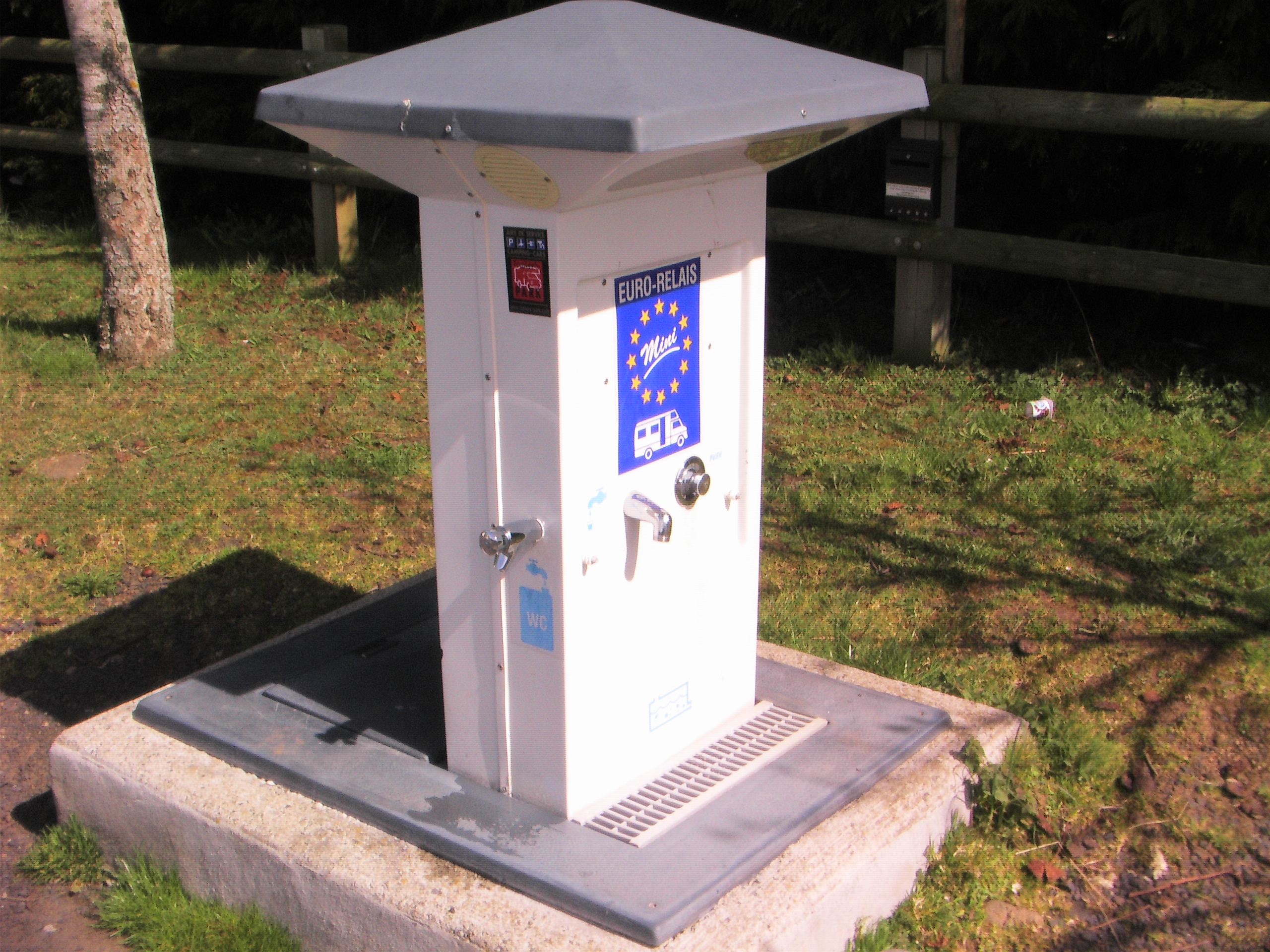
Point service of Valuejols, France

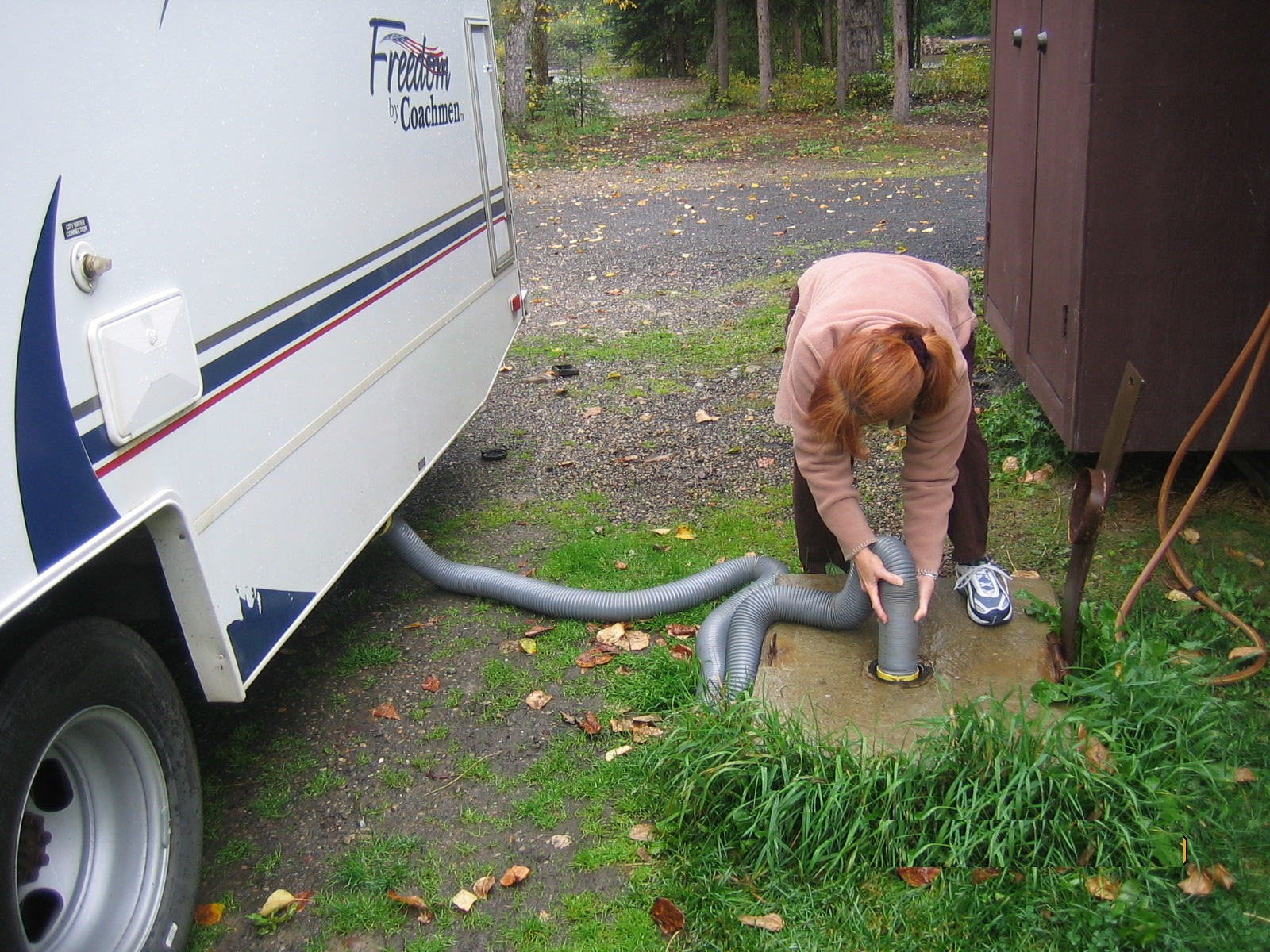
Dumping at an RV campground in Canada
