= Rustic architecture =

Style of architecture

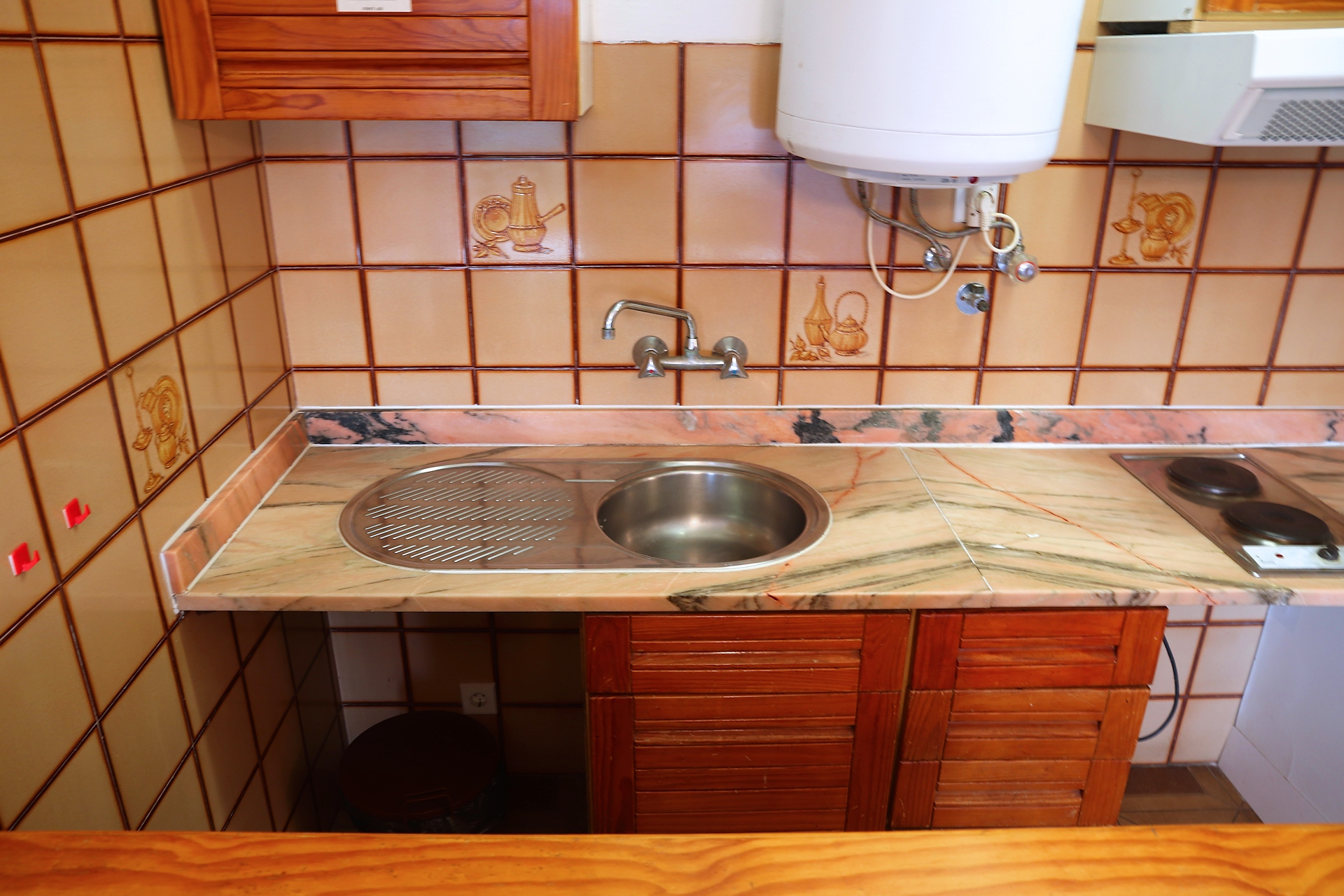
Rustic style tiled kitchen sink area in a rental apartment in Portugal. Stainless steel kitchen sink. Marble countertop.

Rustic architecture is a style of architecture in the United States used in rural government and private structures and their landscape interior design. It was influenced by the American Craftsman style.

According to the National Park Service, “The style of architecture which has been most widely used in our forested National Parks, and other wilderness parks, is generally referred to as "rustic.” It is, or should be, something more than the worn and misused term implies. It is earnestly hoped that a more apt and expressive designation for the style may evolve, but until it appears, "rustic," in spite of its inaccuracy and inadequacy, must be resorted to...."

Rustic Architecture related to national parks is sometimes referred to as Parkitecture.

== Rustic styles and types ==
- National Park Service rustic style which applies to U.S. National Park Service designed structures.
- WPA Rustic architecture of the U.S. Works Project Administration.
- Great Depression era park projects by the U.S. Civilian Conservation Corps and other federal entities.
- Adirondack Architecture and the Great Camps.
- Log cabins.

== See also ==
- Rustic modern
- Pastoral
- Vernacular architecture
