= Century ride =

100km road cycling ride

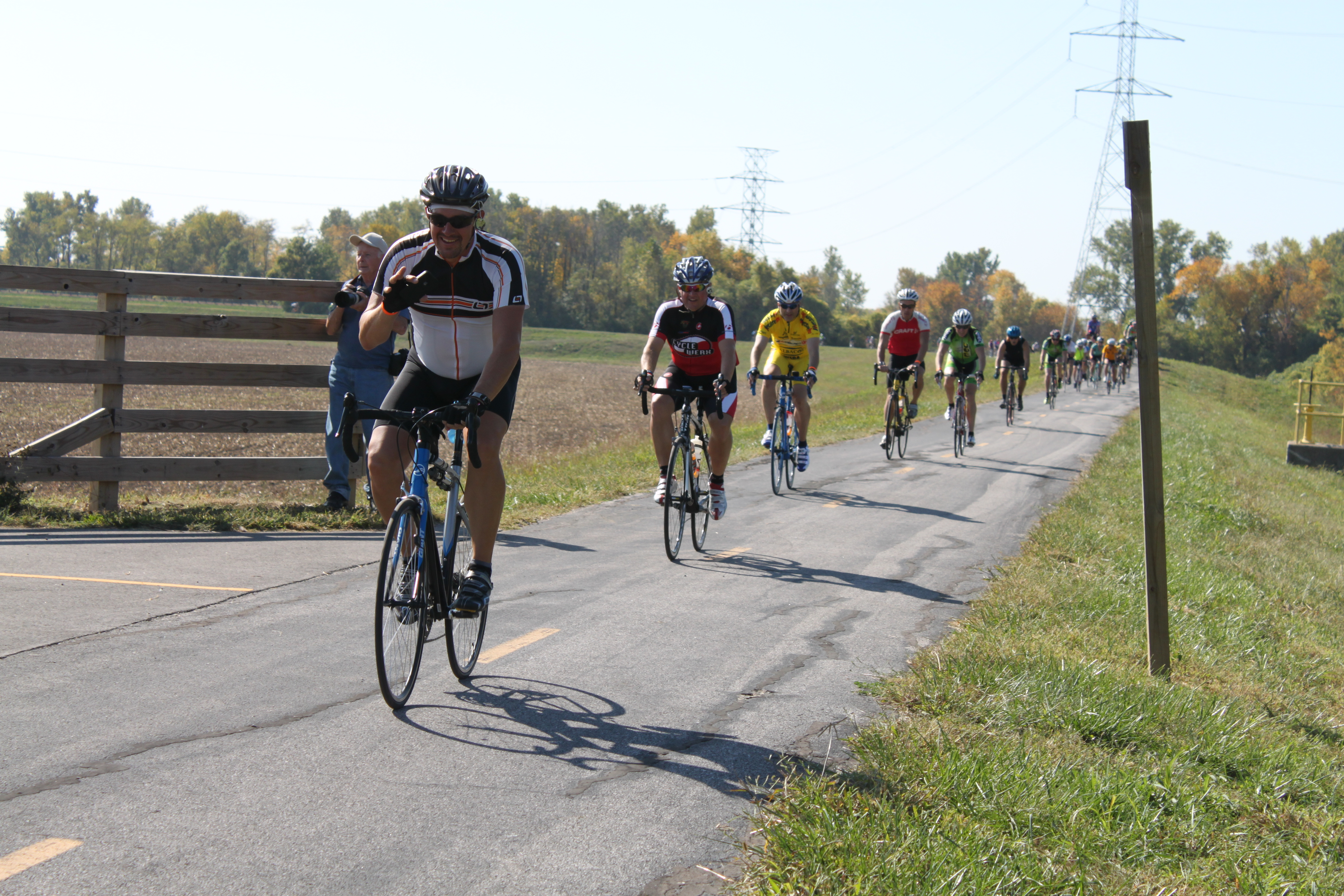
A century ride in Illinois

A century ride is a single day road cycling ride of 100 kilometers (62.1 mi) in metric system countries or 100 miles (160.9 km) in imperial system countries. Riding a century is known to be physically and mentally challenging, and riders will often train in advance for these rides. These rides are often organized as a cycling club-sponsored event. Many cycling clubs sponsor an annual century ride as both a social event for cyclists and as a fund-raiser for the club’s other activities.

The origins of the century ride are obscure, but Dora Rinehart did century rides in Denver, Colorado in the 1890s. The Tour of the Scioto River Valley (TOSRV) began in 1962 with two riders. The Rideau Lakes Cycle Tour started in 1972 with eighty riders. The Apple Cider Century dates back to 1974.

== Ride lengths ==
Club-sponsored century rides typically offer several options for cyclists of varying abilities, such as…

- Quarter century, 25 km (15.5 mi)
- Half century, 50 km (31.1 mi)
- Double century, 200 km (124.3 mi)

Double century rides are usually scheduled near the summer solstice to take advantage of the longer daylight hours, and begin at or before dawn.

The term Imperial century is sometimes used to indicate that 100 miles in the imperial system is used instead of the implied 100 kilometers, more common in the metric system. The term Metric century is used inside the United States and United Kingdom to indicate that 100 kilometers (62.1 mi) is being ridden.

A double metric is the shortest distance in randonneuring, long distance rides in multiples of 100 kilometers. Unlike centuries, riders in a randonneuring event, or brevet, pass through checkpoints on the route ensuring that the entire route is being completed. Amateur brevets are generally a test of endurance, rather than speed. Brevets also differ from centuries in being self-supported, riders either carrying or purchasing supplies along the route.

== Sponsorship ==
A sanctioned century ride is organized and conducted under the rules and liability protection of a sanctioning organization, such as the League of American Bicyclists. Sanctioned rides typically have rest stops every 25 miles or so, where water, food and toilets are available for cyclists. On a supported century ride, the route is patrolled by a sag wagon to assist riders with bicycle maintenance, or provide transportation back to the starting line for those unable to ride the entire course. Sanctioned rides are almost always supported.

== North America ==
The larger, more unusual and better known annual century rides in the United States and Canada include:

- El Tour de Tucson in Tucson, Arizona in November, as many as 9,000 riders.
- Apple Cider Century in southwestern Michigan in late September, as many as 5000 riders.
- Hotter'N Hell Hundred in Wichita Falls, Texas, with some 14,000 cyclists in 2009.
- Ride Around Mount Rainier in One Day (RAMROD), hosted by the Redmond Bicycle Club in Enumclaw, Washington.
- Seattle to Portland Bicycle Classic (STP), hosted by the Cascade Bicycle Club, with as many as 10,000 riders every July.
- Tour of the Scioto River Valley (TOSRV) in Columbus, Ohio, organized by Outdoor Pursuits, which drew about 3000 cyclists in May 2011 for the two-day, 210-mile round-trip to Portsmouth.
- Rideau Lakes Cycle Tour (RLCT), Ottawa to Kingston and back, 2000 to 2500 riders.

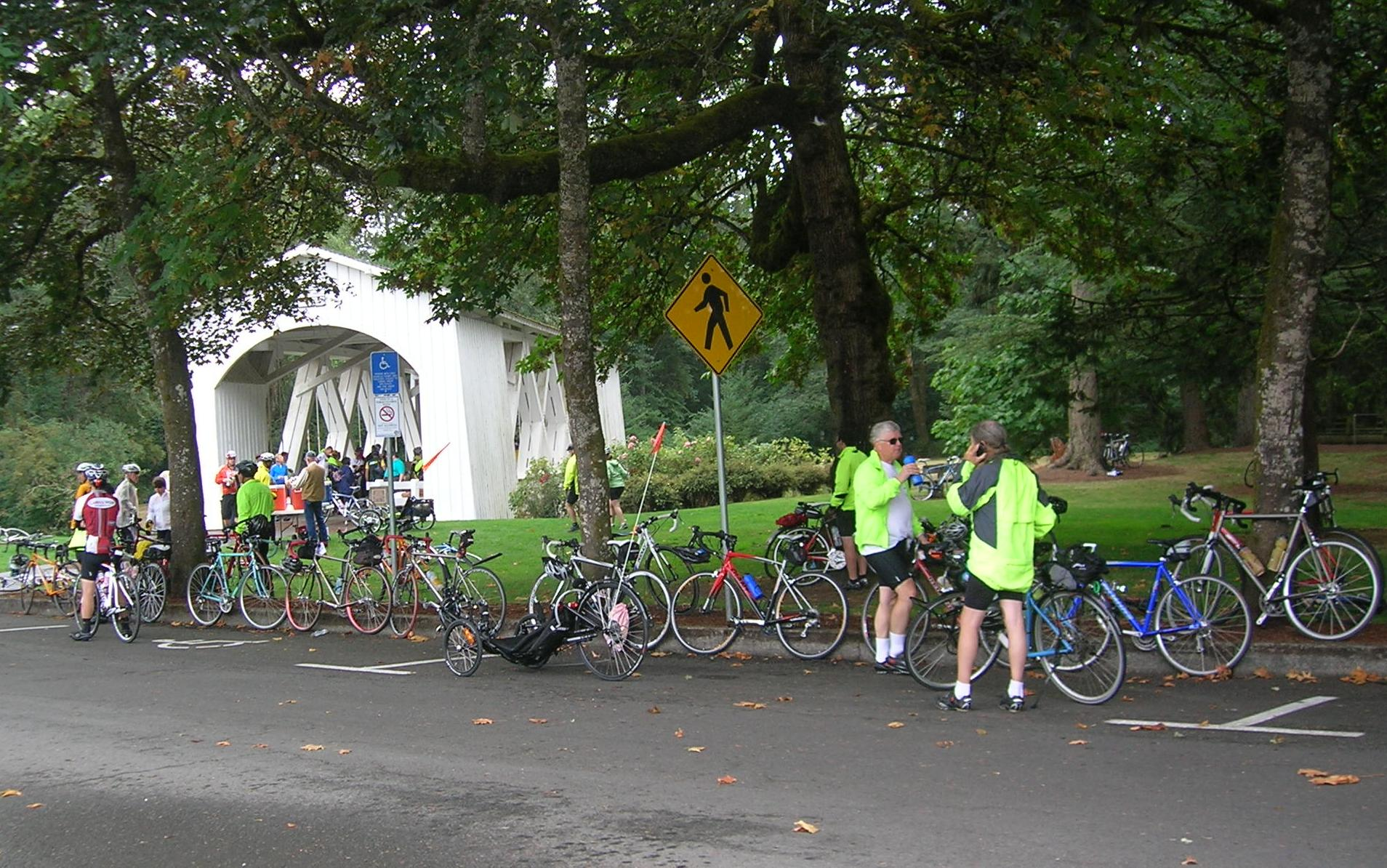
A rest stop at a sanctioned century ride in Oregon.

Many multiple-day group rides include a century ride in one or more segments of the course. For example, Ride for AIDS Chicago in Illinois is a two-day, 200-mile charity ride in which cyclists complete the first century on Day 1 and the second on Day 2. Ride the Rockies in Colorado often includes at least one century-optional day, as a detour from the shorter main route, as does the Bicycle Ride Across Georgia. The Register's Annual Great Bike Ride Across Iowa, better known as Ragbrai, has included a century day every year since 1973.

== Other countries ==
There are Imperial centuries in the UK, while in Ireland and Europe there are metric and double metric events.

== See also ==
- Challenge riding
- Cyclosportive
- Gran Fondo
