= Bicycle Ride Across Georgia =

Annual road cycling touring event of Georgia, United States

The Bicycle Ride Across Georgia (BRAG) is an annual road-cycling tour across the US state of Georgia. It began in 1980 as an offshoot of RAGBRAI. Between 1,000 and 2,000 riders participate in this great ride every year.

The route covers approximately 400 miles over seven days with options for longer distances. Mid-week, the tour stays two nights in one town allowing riders to either rest or ride a century with lesser mile options. Rest stops are every 8–15 miles and snacks and drinks are provided to registered riders.

== History ==
BRAG was originally called Georgia's Annual State Bicycling Event (GASBE) when it first began in 1980. The head leader on the idea for this event was Dot Moss. The inspiration originally came from the bicycle tour in Iowa called RAGBRAI (Register's Annual Great Bicycle Ride Across Iowa). The first ride began in Savannah, Georgia, and finished in Columbus, Georgia. The ride was a total of 300 miles. In 1985, the name of the ride was changed to Bicycle Ride Across Georgia or BRAG. Originally the tour was organized by local bike shops and each year a different bike shop would take on the organization and promotion of the event. As the event grew, it became obvious that the event would require a full-time staff. An executive director, Jerry Colley, was hired as the Chief Executive Officer and held that position until 2015, when Franklin Johnson took over as Executive Director. In October 2025, Ron Ward was named Director of Domestic BRAG rides, with Johnson continuing as Executive Director and Director of BRAG's growing portfolio of international rides, including those in Mexico, Croatia, The Netherlands, Portugal, and France.

== Preparation ==
=== Training ===
For BRAG, many riders start training in January. Bobby Rone, a BRAG cyclist, makes the following suggestions:

- Beginning in January, try to ride once a week if the weather is above 45 degrees.
- Do short loops at first - 10 to 15 miles.
- After time changes and warmer weather begins in April, try to ride 20 or 30 miles, 3 or 4 days a week.
- Strive for equal amounts of intensity rides, versus distance rides.
- In late May, around Memorial Day, each ride should be 60 to 70 miles.

Rone says that after following his training strategy, the BRAG ride "is very easy and enjoyable."

=== Trail ===
BRAG volunteers choose the route each year and when the time comes around, they help paint the arrows and other lines on the pavement. They also post BRAG signs to help bikers out. The volunteers also pre-bike the ride to make sure it is a good route for cyclists from all over. When the registration papers and fees are collected for each rider, an envelope is sent back to the rider, with information about the ride and precise distances and directions for every turn. For example, a directions packet might say something like this, "Begin a 1.2 mile serious climb ..." They are made easy to follow.

== Riders ==
Everyone has their own reason to ride on BRAG. Many ride to keep in shape, many ride to accomplish a personal goal or complete a personal challenge, many ride for fun with family and/or friends, or on their own, as a hobby. And others ride to enjoy scenery, different terrain, and new country. On BRAG, almost all riders believe that it is more about the journey, rather than the destination. Riders may choose to complete as much or as little of the tour as they want to. This means each rider may travel a different distance during the week.

On average, each rider travels between 43 and 100 miles in a day. Each day of riding is pre-mapped out and planned so riders know where to go and what kind of trek is ahead for each day. When the trek for the day is complete, the cyclists stop in a city or town, and set up camp at a local high school, college, park, or other setting. In the evenings, bikers can relax or enjoy entertainment and tourism for the remainder of the night. If riders want to go out, host town shuttles provide transportation between the camp site and spots around town, such as hotels, restaurant districts, and shopping centers. At the camp site, riders can choose to either set up camp outside, in a tent, on a field -most likely a soccer or football field-, or inside in a gym. Indoor camping requires an extra fee applicable to the whole week. In the morning, most riders begin riding early to avoid the heat. Most of the routes are back roads with beautiful scenery and little traffic. Official BRAG rest stops are spaced every 10 to 18 miles and provide drinks and snacks to riders. Organizers suggest that riders not stop longer than 5 minutes to avoid difficulty restarting that may come from lactic acid.

Cyclists not able to take the heat (average temperature is usually around 90 degrees Fahrenheit) or not able to ride up a hill can be picked up by BRAG support wagons and taken to the next rest stop. Those not able to bike for a couple days can purchase transportation to the next town on the BRAG Shuttle. Riders can choose to ride a single day, "BRAG Lite" of either the first or last half of the ride, or the full week. Shuttles are available for purchase back to the originating town on any given day, or back to the start for the full week or BRAG Lite.

While BRAG rest stops along the route are well stocked with snacks and hydration, other food during the week is the responsibility of each participant. BRAG arranges for at least one food truck to be on site each day; they typically stay until they run out of food. Shuttles provided by our overnight towns take participants to other dining locations.

== Miscellaneous information ==
BRAG experts and experienced trekkers advise that participants ensure their bikes are tuned up and in good condition for the ride. They also advise that riders stick to a consistent cadence (pedaling speed) of at least 80 revolutions per minute, and know how to operate their gears correctly.

== Tours, stops, and dates ==
=== 2026 BRAG ===
The route for the 2026 Big BRAG will begin Saturday, May 30 in LaFayette, GA and end on Saturday, June 6 in Columbus, GA. Riders will stop overnight in the following locations:

- Sunday, May 31 - Rome, GA - The Forum
- Monday, June 1 - Cave Spring, GA - Rolater Park
- Tuesday & Wednesday, June 2-3 - Carrollton, GA - Carrollton High School
- Thursday, June 4 - Trilith, GA - Trilith
- Friday, June 5 - LaGrange, GA - LaGrange High School
- Saturday, June 6 - Columbus, GA - Woodruff Riverfront Park

=== 2025 BRAG ===
The route for the 2025 Big BRAG began Saturday, May 31 in Rome, GA and ended on Saturday, June 7 in Hartwell, GA. Riders stopped overnight in the following locations:

- Sunday, June 1 - Cartersville, GA - Georgia Highlands Carterville Campus
- Monday, June 2 - Jasper, GA - Lee Newton Park
- Tuesday & Wednesday, June 3-4 - Dawsonville, GA - Main Street Park
- Thursday, June 5 - Clarkesville, GA - Ruby Fulbright Center
- Friday, June 6 - Toccoa, GA - Stephens County Recreation
- Saturday, June 7 - Hartwell, GA - Hart County High School

=== 2024 BRAG ===
The route for the 2024 Big BRAG began Saturday, June 1 in Atlanta, GA and ended on Saturday, June 8 in Savannah, GA. Riders stopped overnight in the following locations:

- Sunday, June 2 - Oxford, GA - Emory University at Oxford
- Monday, June 3 - Social Circle, GA - Social Circle Elementary School
- Tuesday & Wednesday, June 4-5 - Milledgeville, GA - Walter B. Williams Jr. Park
- Thursday, June 6 - Swainsboro, GA - East Georgia State College
- Friday, June 7 - Statesboro, GA - Georgia Southern University
- Saturday, June 8 - Savannah, GA - Daffin Park

=== 2023 BRAG ===
The route for the 2023 Big BRAG began Saturday, June 3 in Clayton, GA and ended on Saturday, June 10 in Augusta, GA. Riders stopped overnight in the following locations:

- Sunday, June 4 - Clarkesville, GA - Ruby C Fulbright Aquatic Center
- Monday, June 5 - Gainesville, GA - Gainesville Civic Center
- Tuesday & Wednesday, June 6-7 - Braselton, GA - Braselton Civic Center
- Thursday, June 8 - Madison, GA - Empire Mills
- Friday, June 9 - Thomson, GA - McDuffie Achievement Center
- Saturday, June 10 - Augusta, GA - Augusta Common

=== 2022 BRAG ===
The route for the 2022 Big BRAG began Saturday, June 4 in Columbus, GA and ended on Saturday, June 11 in Brunswick, GA. Riders stopped overnight in the following locations:

- Sunday, June 5 - Thomaston, GA - Thomaston-Upson Civic Center
- Monday, June 6 - Perry, GA - Georgia National Fairgrounds
- Tuesday & Wednesday, June 7–8 - Dublin, GA - Stubbs Park
- Thursday, June 9 - Hazlehurst, GA - Jeff Davis High School
- Friday, June 10 - Jesup, GA - Wayne County High School
- Saturday, June 11 - Brunswick, GA - Veterans Memorial Park

=== 2021 BRAG ===
The route for the 2021 BRAG began Saturday, June 5 in Lookout Mtn, TN and ended on Saturday, June 12 in Columbus, GA. Riders stopped overnight in the following locations:

- Sunday, June 6 - LaFayette, GA - LaFayette High School
- Monday, June 7 - Cave Springs, GA - Rolater Park
- Tuesday & Wednesday, June 8-9 - Carrollton, GA - Carrollton High School
- Thursday, June 10 - Senoia, GA - Coweta Charter Academy
- Friday, June 11 - LaGrange, GA - LaGrange High School
- Saturday, June 12 - Columbus, GA - Columbus Waterfront

=== 2019 BRAG ===
The route for the 2019 BRAG began Saturday, June 1 in Ellijay, GA and ended on Saturday, June 8 in Darien, GA. Riders stopped overnight in the following locations:

- Sunday, June 2 - Gainesville, GA - Lake Lanier Olympic Park
- Monday, June 3 - Covington, GA - Indian Creek Middle School
- Tuesday & Wednesday, June 4–5 - Milledgeville, GA - GCSU Centennial Center
- Thursday, June 6 - Swainsboro, GA - East Georgia State College
- Friday, June 7 - Hinesville, GA - Shuman Recreation Center
- Saturday, June 8 - Darien, GA - Darien River Waterfront Park & Docks

=== 2018 BRAG ===
The route for the 2018 BRAG began Saturday, June 2 in Rome, GA and ended on Saturday, June 9 in Hartwell, GA. Riders stopped overnight in the following locations:

- Sunday, June 3 - Dalton, GA - ??
- Monday, June 4 - Dahlonega, GA - ??
- Tuesday & Wednesday, June 5-6 - Jasper, GA - ??
- Thursday, June 7 - Clarkesville, GA - ??
- Friday, June 8 - Toccoa, GA - ??
- Saturday, June 9 - Hartwell, GA - Long Point Park

=== 2017 BRAG ===
The route for the 2017 BRAG began Saturday, June 3 in Athens, GA and ended on Saturday, June 10 in Brunswick, GA. Riders stopped overnight in the following locations:

- Sunday, June 4 - Washington, GA - Pope Center
- Monday, June 5 - Thomson, GA - McDuffie Achievement Center (School)
- Tuesday & Wednesday, June 6–7 - Louisville, GA - Louisville Academy / Helen Clark Park
- Thursday, June 8 - Metter, GA - Metter Elementary School
- Friday, June 9 - Jesup, GA - Wayne County High School
- Saturday, June 10 - Brunswick, GA - Mary Ross Waterfront Park

=== 2016 BRAG ===
The route for the 2016 BRAG began Saturday, June 4 in Atlanta, GA and ended on Saturday, June 11 in Savannah, GA. Riders stopped overnight in the following locations:

- Sunday, June 5 - Social Circle, GA - Social Circle Middle-High School
- Monday, June 6 - Milledgeville, GA - GCSU Centennial Center
- Tuesday & Wednesday, June 7-8 - Dublin, GA - Stubbs Park
- Thursday, June 9 - Swainsboro, GA - East Georgia State College
- Friday, June 10 - Statesboro, GA - Georgia Southern University
- Saturday, June 11 - Savannah, GA - Emmet Park

=== 2015 BRAG ===
The proposed route for the 2015 BRAG will be a loop/figure 8 course and not a point-to-point ride. 2015 BRAG will begin Sunday, June 7 in Newnan, GA and will end on Saturday, June 13 also in Newnan. Riders will stop overnight in the following locations:

- Monday, June 8 - Carrollton, GA
- Tuesday & Wednesday, June 9–10 - Newnan, GA
- Thursday & Friday, June 11–12 - LaGrange, GA
- Saturday, June 13 - Newnan, GA

=== 2014 BRAG ===
The route for the 2014 BRAG began Sunday, June 8 in Washington, GA and ended on Saturday, June 14 in Darien, GA. Riders stopped overnight in the following locations:

- Monday, June 9 - Thomson, GA - Thomson High School
- Tuesday & Wednesday, June 10–11 - Waynesboro, GA - Burke County Middle School
- Thursday, June 12 - Metter, GA - Metter High School
- Friday, June 13 - Jesup, GA - Wayne County High School
- Saturday, June 14 - Darien, GA - Darien Waterfront Park

=== 2012 BRAG ===
The route for the 2012 BRAG began Saturday, June 2 in Fort Oglethorpe, GA and ended on Saturday, June 9 in Tiger, GA. Riders stopped overnight in the following locations:

- Sunday, June 3 - Dalton, GA - Dalton High School
- Monday, June 4 - Jasper, GA - Pickens County Community Center
- Tuesday & Wednesday, June 5–6 - Roswell, GA - Roswell High School
- Thursday, June 7 - Winder, GA - Winder Barrow High School
- Friday, June 8 - Mount Airy, GA - Habersham 9th Grade Academy
- Saturday, June 9 - Tiger, GA - Rabun County High School

=== 2011 BRAG ===
The route for the 2011 BRAG began Saturday, June 4 in Atlanta, GA and ended on Saturday, June 11 in Savannah, GA. Riders stopped overnight in the following locations:

- Sunday, June 5 - Oxford, GA - Emory University at Oxford
- Monday, June 6 - Milledgeville, GA - Georgia Military College
- Tuesday & Wednesday, June 7–8 - Dublin, GA - Dublin High School
- Thursday, June 9 - Metter, GA - Metter High School
- Friday, June 10 - Hinesville, GA - Snelson-Golden Middle School
- Saturday, June 11 - Savannah, GA - Armstrong Atlantic State University

=== 2010 BRAG ===
The route for the 2010 BRAG began Saturday, June 5 in Peachtree City, GA and ended on Saturday, June 12, also in Peachtree City. Riders stopped overnight in the following locations:

- Sunday, June 6 - Griffin, GA
- Monday, June 7 - Thomaston, GA
- Tuesday & Wednesday, June 8–9 - Columbus, GA
- Thursday, June 10 - LaGrange, GA
- Friday, June 11 - Newnan, GA

=== 2009 BRAG ===
The route for the 2009 BRAG began Sunday, June 7, in Hiawassee, Georgia and ended in South Carolina at the Savannah Lakes Resort and Marina on Saturday, June 13. 2009. Riders stopped overnight in the following towns:

- Sunday, June 7 - Dahlonega, GA - Lumpkin County Middle School
- Monday, June 8 - Mount Airy, GA - Habersham Central High School
- Tuesday & Wednesday, June 9–10 - Athens, GA - Clarke Middle School
- Thursday, June 11 - Elberton, GA - Elbert County Comprehensive High School
- Friday, June 12 - Washington, GA - Washington-Wilkes Comprehensive High School
- Saturday, June 13 - near McCormick, SC - Savannah Lakes Resort & Marina

=== 2008 BRAG ===
The route for the 2008 BRAG began Sunday, June 8 in Oxford, GA and ended on St. Simons Island, GA on Saturday, June 14. 2008's route stopped overnight in the following towns:

- Sunday, June 8 - Griffin, GA - Spalding High School
- Monday, June 9 - Macon, GA - First Presbyterian Day School
- Tuesday & Wednesday, June 10–11 - Dublin, GA - Dublin High School
- Thursday, June 12 - Hazlehurst, GA - Jeff Davis County High School
- Friday, June 13 - Jesup, GA - Wayne County High School
- Saturday, June 14 - St. Simons Island, GA - Neptune Park

=== 2007 BRAG ===
The route for the 2007 BRAG began Sunday, June 9 in Columbus, GA and ended in Savannah, GA on Saturday, June 16. Overnight stops were in the following towns:

- Sunday, June 10 - Americus, GA - Georgia Southwestern State University
- Monday, June 11 - Cordele, GA - Crisp County High School
- Tuesday & Wednesday, June 12–13 - Douglas, GA - South Georgia College
- Thursday, June 14 - Baxley, GA - Appling County Comp High School
- Friday, June 15 - Hinesville, GA - Bradwell Institute
- Saturday, June 16 - Savannah, GA - Grayson Stadium/Daffin Park

	Day 0	Day 1	Day 2	Day 3	Day 4	Day 5	Day 6	Day 7
1980	Savannah	Metter	Dublin	Perry	Thomaston	Columbus	-	-
1981	Eufala, AL	Plains	Cordele	McRae	Claxton	Savannah	-	-
1982	West Point	Manchester	Forsyth	Milledgeville	Swainsboro	Statesboro	Savannah	-
1983	Seminole	Albany	Fitzgerald	Holiday	Beach	Jesup	Richmond Hill	Savannah
1984	Helen	Clarkesville	Hartwell	Elijah	Clark	Louisville	Springfield	Savannah
1985	Stone Mountain	Rutledge	Milledgeville	Louisville	Statesboro	Richmond Hill	Fort Jackson	-
1986	Whitesburg	Griffin	Macon	Dublin	Vidalia	Rambling Creek	Savannah	-
1987	Helen	Gainesville	Athens	Oxford	Macon	Americus	Albany	-
1988	Hartwell	Washington	Augusta	Coleman Lake	Vidalia	Jesup	Jekyll Island	-
1989	Atlanta (GT)	Winder	Greensboro	Thomson	Waynesboro	Statesboro	Ft. Stewart	Savannah
1990	Rome	Powder Springs	Carrolton	LaGrange	Calloway Gardens	Columbus	Americus	Albany
1991	Hampton	FFA Campground	Milledgeville	Dublin	Eastman	Vidalia	Statesboro	Savannah
1992	Rossville	Calhoun	Waleska	Lake Lanier	Athens	Elberton	Wildwood Pk	Augusta
1993	Atlanta (GT)	Oxford	Eatonton	Thomson	Waynesboro	Swainsboro	Statesboro	Savannah
1994	Bainbridge	Thomasville	Valdosta	Tifton	Douglas	Waycross	Jesup	Savannah
1995	Rome	Dalton	Ellijay	Dahlonega	Toccoa	Elberton	Ft. Gordon	Augusta
1996	Atlanta (Og)	Oxford	Madison	Milledgeville	Swainsboro	Statesboro	Ft. Stewart	Savannah
1997	Lafayette	Rome	Carrolton	Newnan	Thomaston	Ft. Valley	Americus	Albany
1998	Oxford	Griffin	Newnan	Dallas	Waleska	Gainesville	Winder	Oxford
1999	LaGrange	Columbus	Thomaston	Perry	Dublin	Metter	Statesboro	Savannah
2000	Eufala, AL	Americus	Tifton	Douglas	Vidalia	Hinesville	Savannah	-
2001	Hartwell	Washington	Milledgeville	Dublin	Dublin	Vidalia	Jesup	St. Simons, Isle
2002	Rockmart	Rome	Dalton	Ellijay	Ellijay	Hiawasee	Toccoa	Hartwell
2003	Bainbridge	Thomasville	Valdosta	Douglas	Douglas	Waycross	Brunswick	St. Marys
2004	Toccoa	Elberton	Thomson	Waynesboro	Waynesboro	Metter	Effingham	Tybee Isle
2005	Columbus	Thomaston	Warner Robins	Dublin	Dublin	Vidalia	Jesup	Jekyll Island
2006	Dalton	Cartersville	Jasper	Gainesville	Gainesville	Commerce	Washington	Augusta
2007	Columbus	Americus	Cordele	Douglas	Douglas	Baxley	Hinesville	Savannah
2008	Oxford	Griffin	Macon	Dublin	Dublin	Hazlehurst	Jesup	St. Simons, Isle
2009	Hiawassee	Dahlonega	Mt. Airy	Athens	Athens	Elberton	Washington	McCormick, SC
2010	Fayetteville	Griffin	Thomaston	Columbus	Columbus	LaGrange	Newnan	Fayetteville
2011	Atlanta (Og)	Oxford	Milledgeville	Dublin	Dublin	Metter	Hinesville	Savannah
2012	Ft. Oglethorphe	Dalton	Jasper	Roswell	Roswell	Winder	Mt. Airy	Tiger
2013	Cordele	Tifton	Douglas	Douglas	Wayross	Brunswick	St. Marys	-
2014	Washington	Thomson	Waynesboro	Waynesboro	Metter	Jesup	Darien	-
2015	Newnan	Carrollton	Newnan	Newnan	LaGrange	LaGrange	Newnan	
2016	Atlanta (Og)	Social Circle	Milledgeville	Dublin	Dublin	Swainsboro	Statesboro	Savannah
2017	Athens	Washington	Thomson	Louisville	Louisville	Metter	Jesup	Brunswick
2018	Rome	Dalton	Jasper	Dahlonega	Dahlonega	Clarkesville	Toccoa	Hartwell
2019	Ellijay	Gainesville	Covington	Milledgeville	Milledgeville	Swainsboro	Hinesville	Darien
2020	postponed to 2021 due to Covid-19 concerns							
2021	Lookout Mountain	LaFayette	Cave Spring	Carrollton	Carrollton	Senoia	LaGrange	Columbus
2022	Columbus	Thomaston	Perry	Dublin	Dublin	Hazlehurst	Jesup	Brunswick
2023	Clayton	Clarkesville	Gainesville	Braselton	Braselton	Madison	Thomson	Augusta
2024	Atlanta	Oxford	Social Circle	Milledgeville	Milledgeville	Swainsboro	Statesboro	Savannah
2025	Rome	Cartersville	Jasper	Dawsonville	Dawsonville	Clarkesville	Toccoa	Hartwell
2026	LaFayette	Rome	Cave Spring	Carrollton	Carrollton	Trillith	LaGrange	Columbus

== See also ==
- Cycling
- Bicycle touring
- Cycling in Atlanta
