= Cycling in Atlanta =

Bicycle commuting in Atlanta. Georgia, USA

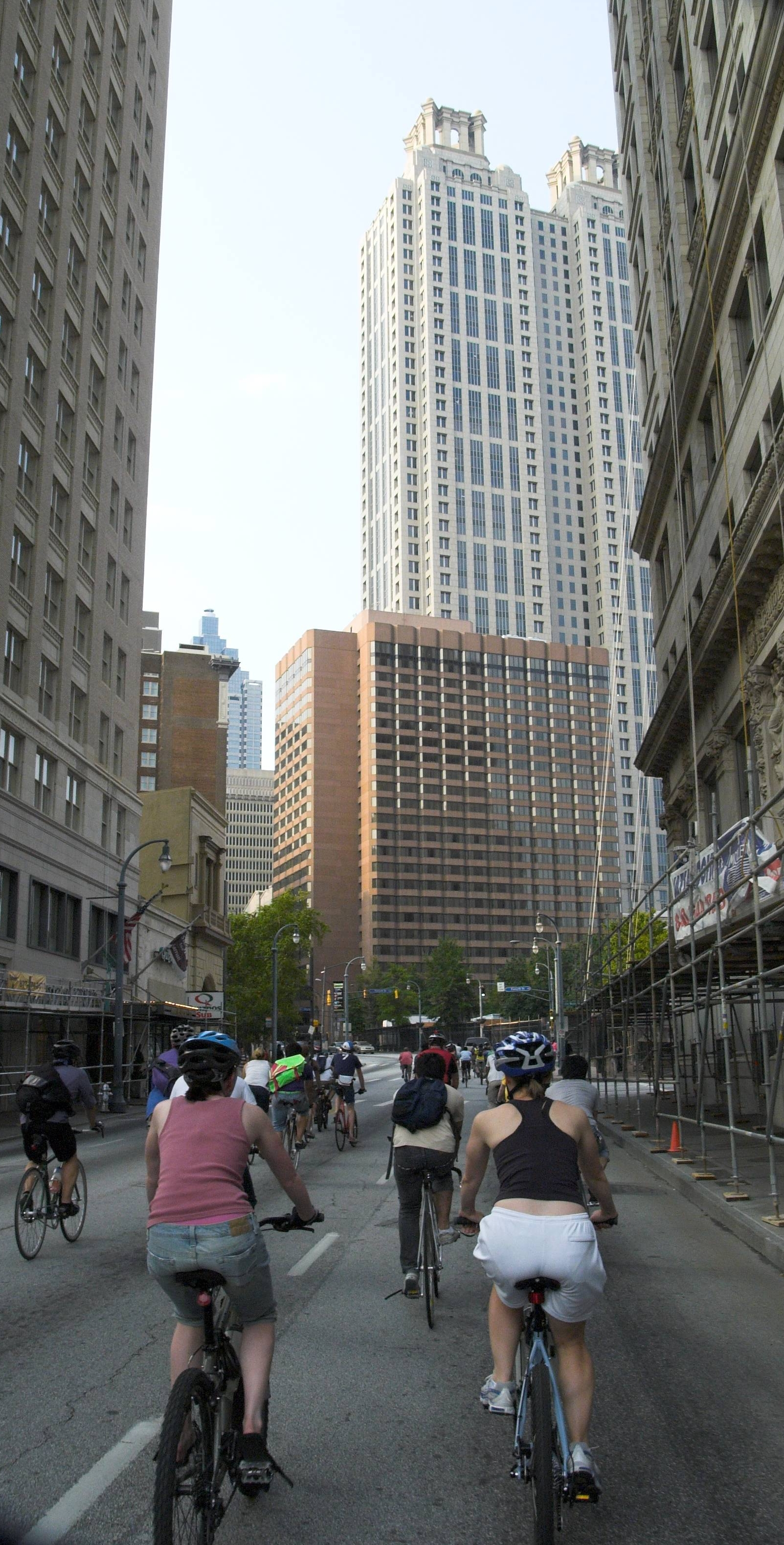
A group of several bikers in downtown Atlanta

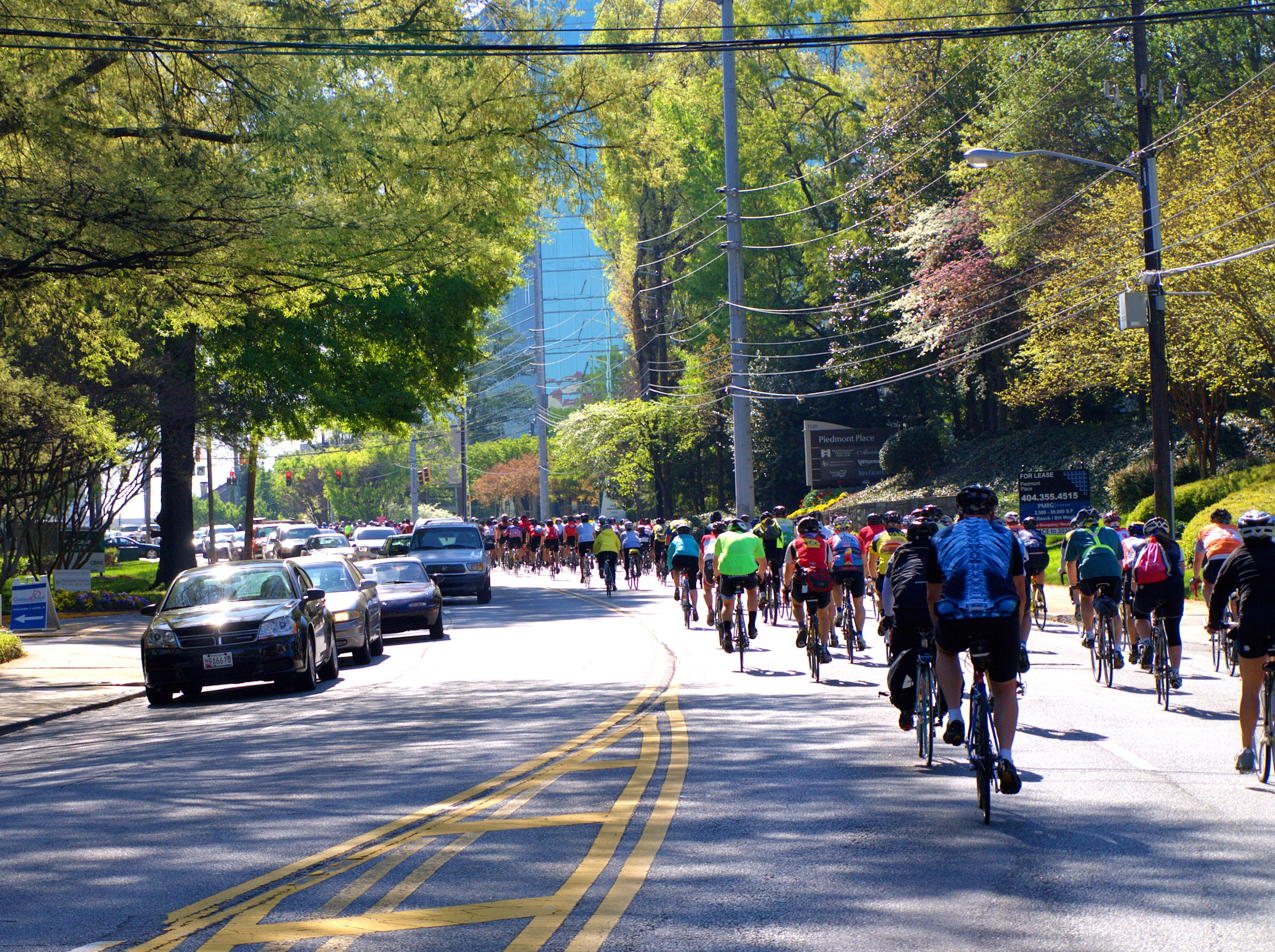
These bikers are riding to the Georgia State Capitol

Cycling in Atlanta has grown in popularity in recent years, from 0.33% of commutes in 2000 to 1.1% in 2009, aided by improving cycling infrastructure and community support. Although Atlanta has historically been a city defined by the automobile, its increasingly compact urban form and mild climate are encouraging residents to cycle to work, shopping, and recreational destinations. Though Atlanta's famed hilly topography can make cycling challenging, though fun, many parts of the city are relatively flat, including some of the more densely populated areas. However, heavy automobile traffic, the lack of bike lanes on many streets, and difficulty in crossing major streets deter most residents from cycling frequently in Atlanta.

== History ==
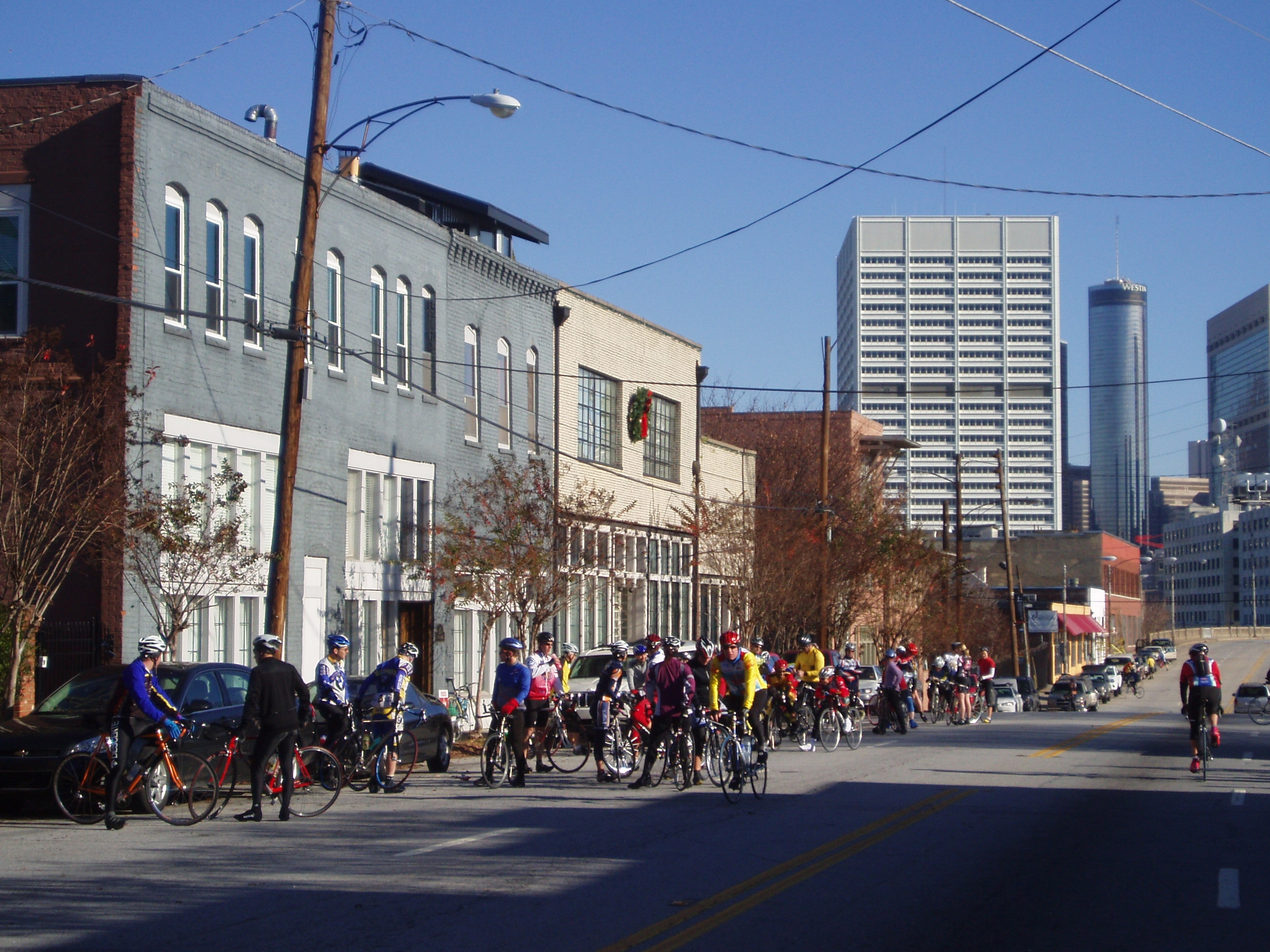
The "Airport Ride", a cycling event, gathers in Castleberry Hill

Prior to 2000, Atlanta's car-choked roads were rarely shared with cyclists. In fact, cycling was associated with those who couldn't afford automobile transportation. However, during the 2000s, due to Atlanta's increasing density, burgeoning intown population, and green ambitions, cycling boomed in popularity. Bike advocacy groups, including Atlanta Bicycle Coalition, began planning bike-centric social events and lobbying city leaders for more cycling infrastructure.

== Culture ==
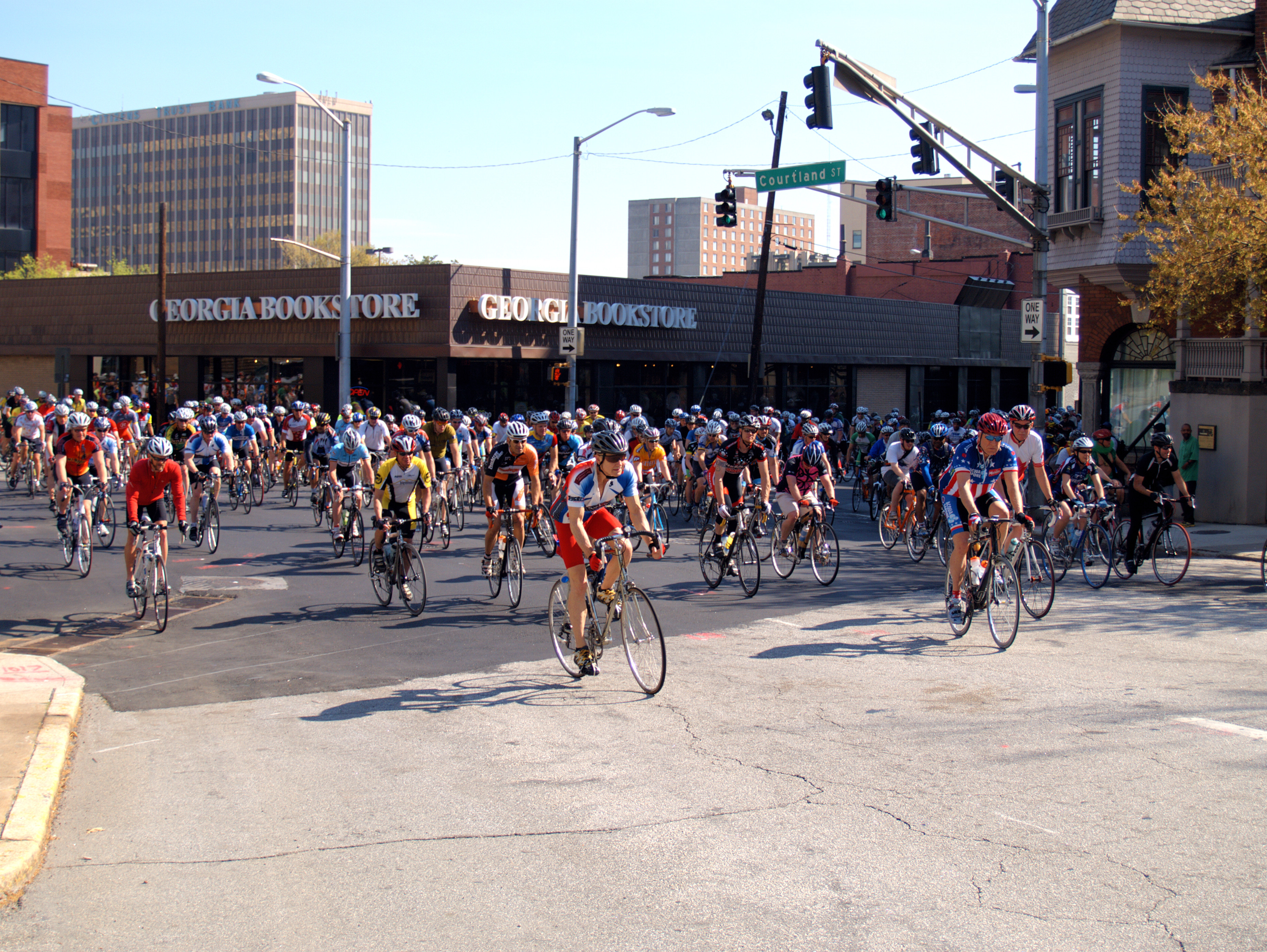
Cycling event in Downtown Atlanta

Atlanta has an active and growing cycling culture organized around many different bike-related social events and clubs. Many of the well-known "cycling cliques" are represented in the city, including urban cyclists, road racing bicycle riders, messengers, and fixed-gear riders ("fixie hipsters").

=== Bicycle clubs ===
Recreational bicycling clubs in Atlanta include Metro Atlanta Cycling Club, Ladies on Spokes, Southern Bicycling League, Bike Emory, Dunwoody Cycling, Sorella Cycling, and Atlanta Cycling, Team Spindle (www.thespindleatl.com) The DopePedalers DopePedalers (@dopepedalers) • Instagram photos and videos.

=== Atlanta Streets Alive ===
Atlanta Streets Alive is a ciclovía held throughout the year. It is a temporary closing of the street to automobiles for use by cyclists. The free event, organized by the Atlanta Bicycle Coalition, takes place in Downtown Atlanta and the Old Fourth Ward, mostly on Edgewood Avenue. Sections of Auburn Avenue, Park Place, and Equitable Place are also closed to automobile traffic. The event kickoff is held at Woodruff Park. Around 6,000 people attend the event, usually held in the spring, summer, or autumn months to take advantage of Atlanta's mild climate.

=== Critical Mass ===
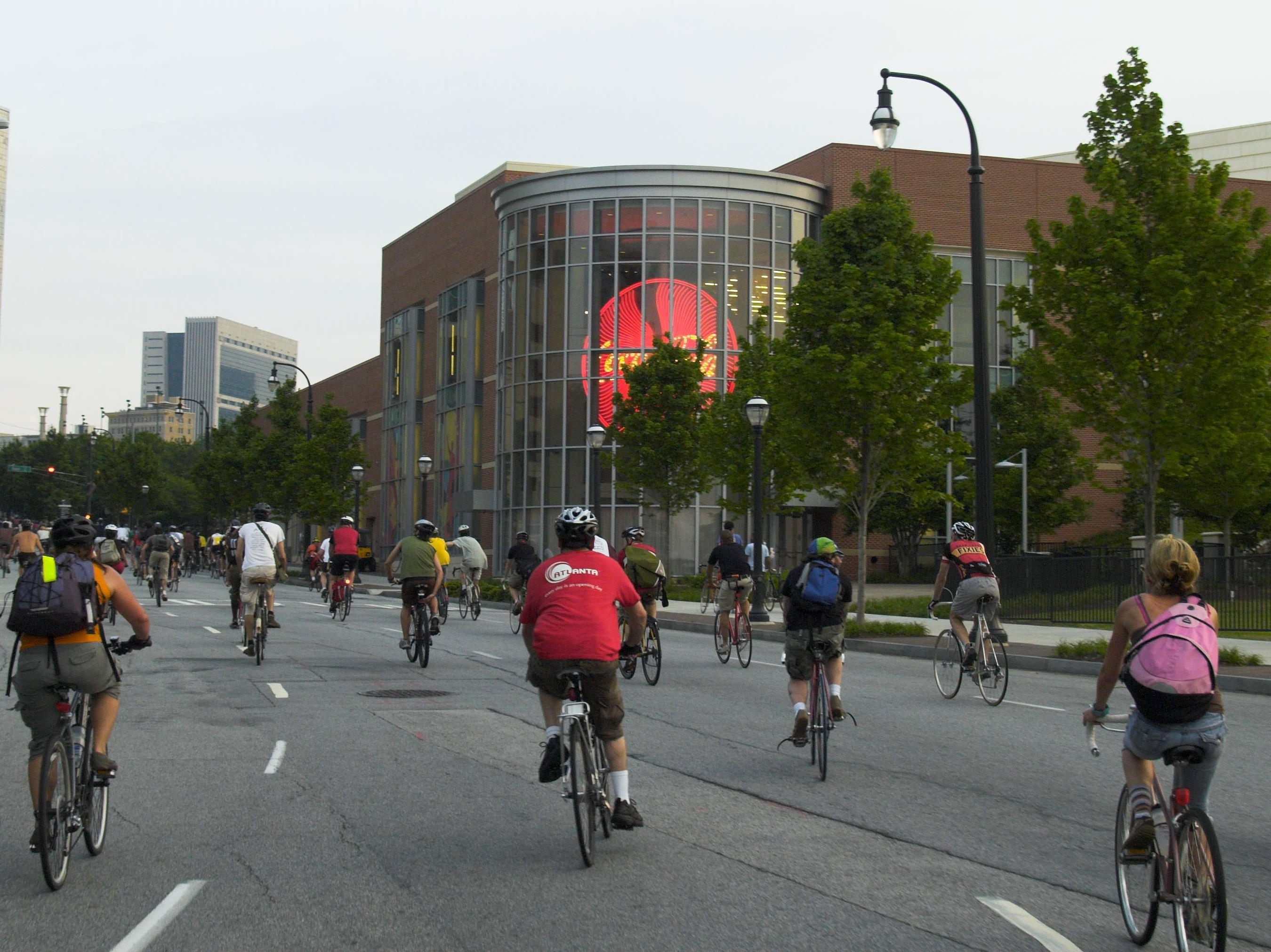
Critical Mass bikers pass the World of Coke

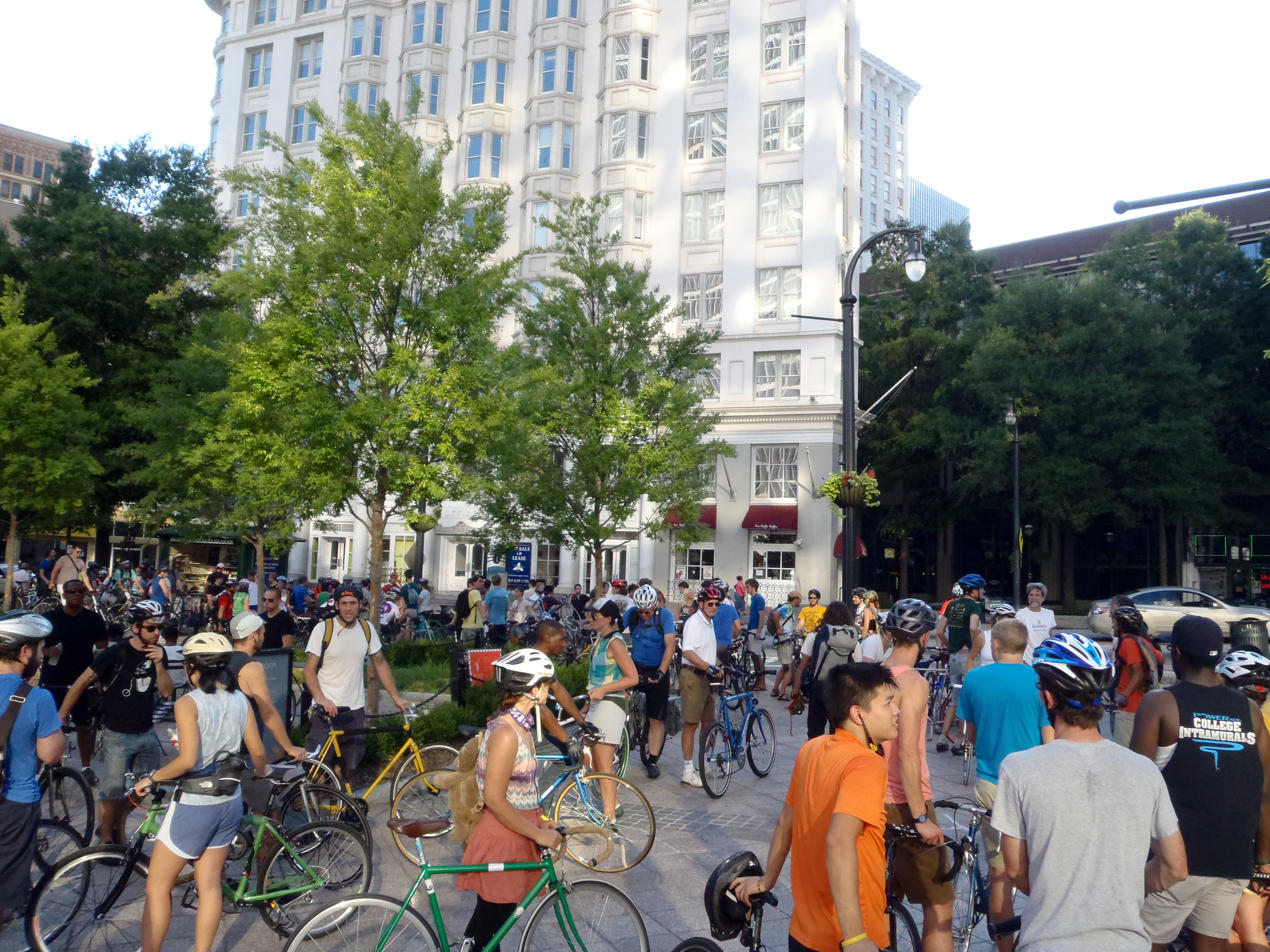
Gathering in Woodruff Park for Critical Mass

The first Critical Mass bicycle ride took place on in 1992 in San Francisco, and has since spread to hundreds of cities worldwide. Atlanta's version of the event, which draws around 300 participants, takes place on the last Friday of each month at 6:30 pm at Woodruff Park. The cyclists then ride through the city en masse, re-claiming the normally auto-dominated streets for bicycle use.

== Infrastructure ==
Atlanta's cycling infrastructure, while improving, has a long way to go. However, in 2010, Atlanta built nearly 15 more miles of bike lanes, both dedicated and shared. There are a number of paved and unpaved trails within and near the city, that are open to cyclists as well as pedestrians.

A "Chief Bicycle Officer" position (CBO) at the City of Atlanta was funded by a five-year $250,000 challenge grant to the Atlanta Bicycle Coalition by the Atlanta Falcons Youth Foundation (an affiliated fund of The Arthur M. Blank family Foundation), beginning in 2015. In October 2015, Becky Katz was hired as Atlanta's first Chief Bicycle Officer. Goals for the CBO position included gathering public input to update the Connect Atlanta plan, and advancing various bicycle infrastructure projects city-wide, as part of a larger push for Atlanta to seek the League of American Bicyclists’ top designation as a “Bicycle Friendly Community”. In April 2018, following Katz's departure from the position, the job was reposted. The City of Atlanta hired Cary Bearn as Chief Bicycle Officer in September 2018.

=== PATH ===
Founded 1991, PATH is a nonprofit that has built more than 100 miles of bike trails throughout Atlanta. Over the next 20 years, the organization plans to construct a spider-like trail connecting Centennial Olympic Park, the Beltline, and the suburbs.

=== Beltline ===
The Beltline, a planned 22-mile loop of transit circling Atlanta, will also have a bike trail component. Current bike trails include a two-and-a-half mile trail in southwest Atlanta, and a two-and-a-half mile trail connecting Piedmont Park to Inman Park.

=== Connect Atlanta ===
Connect Atlanta, the city's comprehensive transportation plan, calls for the construction of more than 200 miles of bike lanes.

== Statistics ==
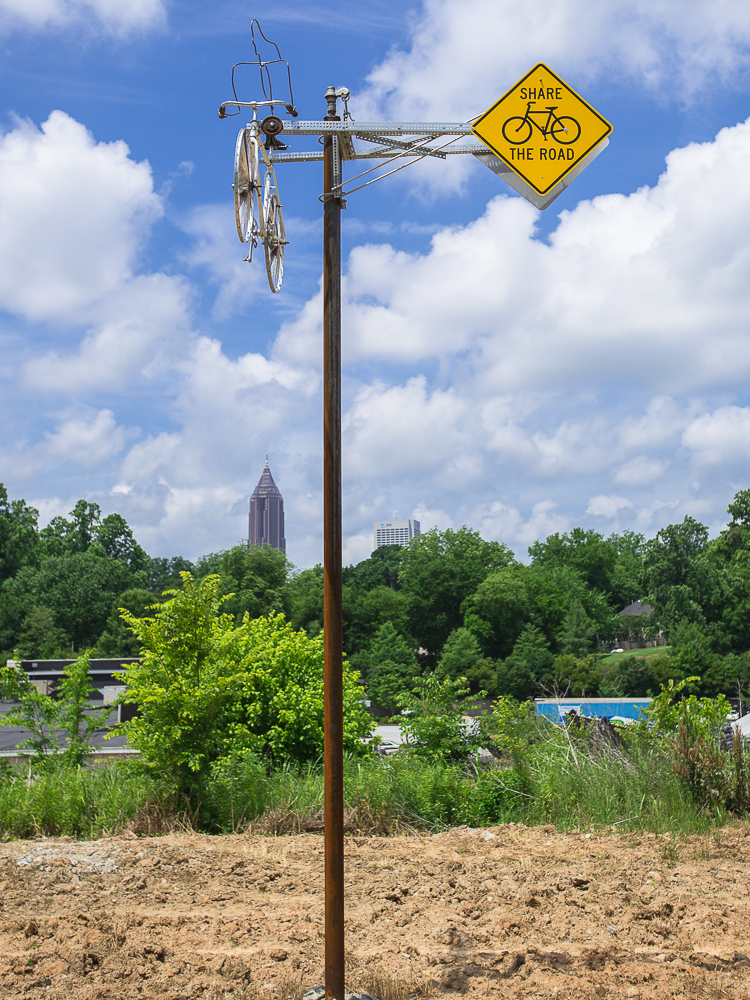
Art advocating cycling along the Beltline

- Miles of bike lanes in the city of Atlanta: 45.2
- Miles of bike lanes proposed under the city's official transportation plan: 226
- Percentage of Georgia bicycle-crash victims under the age of 30 who reported wearing a helmet in accidents from 2000 to 2006: 7

- Percentage of workers commuting by bicycle: 1.1% in 2009, up from 0.33% in 2000.

Year	Bike Lanes (mi)	Sources
2010	53.0	
2011	57.1	
2012	62.8	
2013	66.0	
2014	71.7	
2015	83.8	
2016	104.4	
2017	115.7	

== Advocacy ==
The Atlanta Bicycle Coalition is a nonprofit public-benefit corporation established to "create a healthier, more sustainable Atlanta by making it safer, easier, and more attractive to bicycle for fun, fitness, and transportation." Founded in 1991, the ABC has a dues-paying membership. The ABC organizes or promotes cycling-related events such as Atlanta Streets Alive and Bike Month.

== See also ==
- Atlanta Bicycle Coalition
- Critical Mass
- Atlanta Streets Alive
- Bicycle Ride Across Georgia
