= List of RAGBRAI overnight stops =

Comprehensive list of overnight stops for RAGBRAI

Eight "host communities" are selected each year by RAGBRAI organizers, with the exception of the inaugural route (1973). Two of the communities are beginning or end points, while the other six serve as overnight stops for the participants.

From 1973 to 2016, the distance between consecutive host communities averaged about 67 miles. 1985 was the longest route at 540 miles and 1977 the shortest at 400 miles. On average, the length of the route has been 467 miles.

At the beginning of the ride, riders traditionally dip the rear wheel of their bikes in either the Missouri River or the Big Sioux River (depending on the starting point of the ride), and dip their front wheels in the Mississippi River at the end of the ride. There has been at least one incident of a rider losing his bike after riding into the Mississippi River.

== Statistics ==
- As of 2022, 14 communities have served as the starting point, and 12 have hosted the finish.
- 108 communities have been overnight hosts.
- The ride has passed through all 99 of Iowa's counties in its history.
- Atlantic has served as an overnight host 8 times (1974, 1980, 1989, 1991, 2001, 2011, 2019, 2024)
- Two cities have served as the starting point 8 times: Sioux City (1973, 1978, 1988, 1993, 2001, 2010, 2015, 2023) and Glenwood (1980, 1984, 1989, 1992, 2003, 2011, 2016, 2024).
- In 2019, Burlington became the first community to have been both a finish point as well as an overnight host that was not a finish.
- 1978 was the first year with recurring host cities (Sioux City and Storm Lake).
- 1981 was the most recent year with all first-time host cities.
- 1999 was the first year with no first-time host city.
- 2022 was the most recent year with a first-time host city (Pocahontas).
- Iowa City has the distinction of being the city with longest time between hosting an overnight stay, at 42 years (1976 and 2018). Lansing is the next-longest at 40 years (1977 and 2017); and Centerville and Leon are tied for the third-longest at 35 years (both hosted in 1981 and 2016).
- Willamsburg has the distinction of being the city with longest time without a repeat (1973 to present).

== By year ==
Click on column headings to sort.

					Route (numbers indicate occurrences)							
Year	Dates	Num	Miles (a)	Climb (ft)(a)	Starting City	Sunday	Monday	Tuesday	Wednesday	Thursday	Friday	Saturday
1973	Aug 26–31	I	412	12,637	Sioux City (1)	Storm Lake (1)	Fort Dodge (1)	Ames (1)	Des Moines (1)	Williamsburg (1)	Davenport (1)	N/A
1974	Aug 4–10	II	422	12,648	Council Bluffs (1)	Atlantic (1)	Guthrie Center (1)	Camp Dodge (1)	Marshalltown (1)	Waterloo (1)	Monticello (1)	Dubuque (1)
1975	Aug 3-9	III	450	12,573	Hawarden (1)	Cherokee (1)	Lake View (1)	Boone (1)	Newton (1)	Sigourney (1)	Mount Pleasant (1)	Fort Madison (1)
1976	Aug 1-7	IV	430	13,737	Sidney (1)	Red Oak (1)	Harlan (1)	Jefferson (1)	Nevada (1)	Grinnell (1)	Iowa City (1)	Muscatine (1)
1977	Jul 31-Aug 6	V	400	10,675	Onawa (1)	Ida Grove (1)	Laurens (1)	Algona (1)	Clear Lake (1)	New Hampton (1)	Decorah (1)	Lansing (1)
1978	Jul 30-Aug 5	VI	440	11,238	Sioux City (2)	Storm Lake (2)	Humboldt (1)	Iowa Falls (1)	Vinton (1)	Mount Vernon (1)	Maquoketa (1)	Clinton (1)
1979	Jul 29-Aug 4	VII	480	11,836	Rock Rapids (1)	Spencer (1)	Rockwell City (1)	Story City (1)	Tama-Toledo (1)	Fairfield (1)	Wapello (1)	Burlington (1)
1980	Jul 27-Aug 2	VIII	468	11,912	Glenwood (1)	Atlantic (2)	Carroll (1)	Perry (1)	Webster City (1)	Waverly (1)	Elkader (1)	Guttenberg (1)
1981	Jul 26-Aug 1	IX	490	14,372	Missouri Valley (1)	Mapleton (1)	Lake City (1)	Greenfield (1)	Leon (1)	Centerville (1)	Keosauqua (1)	Keokuk (1)
1982	Jul 25-31	X	523	10,935	Akron (1)	Cherokee (2)	Estherville (1)	Forest City (1)	Charles City (1)	Independence (1)	Tipton (1)	Davenport (2)
1983	Jul 24-30	XI	492	13,010	Onawa (2)	Harlan (2)	Guthrie Center (2)	Ames (2)	Clarion (1)	Grundy Center (1)	Manchester (1)	Dubuque (2)
1984	Jul 22-28	XII	474	11,221	Glenwood (2)	Shenandoah (1)	Creston (1)	Adel (1)	Pella (1)	Ottumwa (1)	Mount Pleasant (2)	Burlington (2)
1985	Jul 21-27	XIII	540	10,741	Hawarden (2)	Sibley (1)	Emmetsburg (1)	Humboldt (2)	Mason City (1)	Waterloo (2)	Monticello (2)	Clinton (2)
1986	Jul 20-26	XIV	479	12,861	Council Bluffs (2)	Red Oak (2)	Audubon (1)	Perry (2)	Eldora (1)	Belle Plaine (1)	Washington (1)	Muscatine (2)
1987	Jul 19-25	XV	437	10,165	Onawa (3)	Denison (1)	Storm Lake (3)	Fort Dodge (2)	Forest City (2)	Osage (1)	West Union (1)	Guttenberg (2)
1988	Jul 24-30	XVI	433	11,609	Sioux City (3)	Ida Grove (2)	Carroll (2)	Boone (2)	Des Moines (2)	Oskaloosa (1)	Fairfield (2)	Fort Madison (2)
1989	Jul 23-29	XVII	479	13,357	Glenwood (3)	Clarinda (1)	Atlantic (3)	Jefferson (2)	Story City (2)	Cedar Falls (1)	Dyersville (1)	Bellevue (1)
1990	Jul 22-28	XVIII	495	9,064	Sioux Center (1)	Spencer (2)	Algona (2)	Hampton (1)	Oelwein (1)	Cedar Rapids (1)	Washington (2)	Burlington (3)
1991	Jul 21-27	XIX	432	14,990	Missouri Valley (2)	Atlantic (4)	Winterset (1)	Knoxville (1)	Grinnell (2)	Amana (1)	Anamosa (1)	Bellevue (2)
1992	Jul 19-25	XX	494	13,455	Glenwood (4)	Shenandoah (2)	Bedford (1)	Osceola (1)	Des Moines (3)	Oskaloosa (2)	Mount Pleasant (3)	Keokuk (2)
1993	Jul 25-31	XXI	525	11,047	Sioux City (4)	Sheldon (1)	Emmetsburg (2)	Clarion (2)	Osage (2)	Decorah (2)	Manchester (2)	Dubuque (3)
1994	Jul 24-30	XXII	511	12,420	Council Bluffs (3)	Harlan (3)	Carroll (3)	Perry (3)	Marshalltown (2)	Marion (1)	Maquoketa (2)	Clinton (3)
1995	Jul 23-29	XXIII	493	10,674	Onawa (4)	Lake View (2)	Fort Dodge (3)	Iowa Falls (2)	Tama-Toledo (2)	Sigourney (2)	Coralville (1)	Muscatine (3)
1996	Jul 21-27	XXIV	437	9,869	Sioux Center (2)	Sibley (2)	Estherville (2)	Lake Mills (1)	Charles City (2)	Cresco (1)	Fayette (1)	Guttenberg (3)
1997	Jul 20-26	XXV	464	14,523	Missouri Valley (3)	Red Oak (3)	Creston (2)	Des Moines (4)	Chariton (1)	Bloomfield (1)	Fairfield (3)	Fort Madison (3)
1998	Jul 19-25	XXVI	488	11,857	Hawarden (3)	Cherokee (3)	Rockwell City (2)	Boone (3)	Eldora (2)	Cedar Falls (2)	Monticello (3)	Sabula (1)
1999	Jul 25-31	XXVII	487	13,490	Rock Rapids (2)	Spencer (3)	Algona (3)	Clear Lake (2)	Waverly (2)	Decorah (3)	Manchester (3)	Bellevue (3)
2000	Jul 23-29	XXVIII	450	17,612	Council Bluffs (4)	Harlan (4)	Greenfield (2)	Ankeny (1)	Knoxville (2)	Ottumwa (2)	Washington (3)	Burlington (4)
2001	Jul 22-28	XXIX	506	17,841	Sioux City (5)	Storm Lake (4)	Denison (2)	Atlantic (5)	Perry (4)	Grinnell (3)	Coralville (2)	Muscatine (4)
2002	Jul 21-27	XXX	480	13,712	Sioux Center (3)	Cherokee (4)	Emmetsburg (3)	Forest City (3)	Charles City (3)	Oelwein (2)	Anamosa (2)	Bellevue (4)
2003	Jul 20-26	XXXI	452 (477)	TBD	Glenwood (5)	Shenandoah (3)	Bedford (2)	Osceola (2)	Oskaloosa (3)	Bloomfield (2)	Mount Pleasant (4)	Fort Madison (4)
2004	Jul 25-31	XXXII	490 (517)	TBD	Onawa (5)	Lake View (3)	Fort Dodge (4)	Iowa Falls (3)	Marshalltown (3)	Hiawatha (1)	Maquoketa (3)	Clinton (4)
2005	Jul 24-30	XXXIII	485	TBD	Le Mars (1)	Sheldon (2)	Estherville (3)	Algona (4)	Northwood (1)	Cresco (2)	West Union (2)	Guttenberg (4)
2006	Jul 23-29	XXXIV	444	TBD	Sergeant Bluff (1)	Ida Grove (3)	Audubon (2)	Waukee (1)	Newton (2)	Marengo (1)	Coralville (3)	Muscatine (5)
2007	Jul 22-28	XXXV	479	TBD	Rock Rapids (3)	Spencer (4)	Humboldt (3)	Hampton (2)	Cedar Falls (3)	Independence (2)	Dyersville (2)	Bellevue (5)
2008	Jul 20-26	XXXVI	471	TBD	Missouri Valley (4)	Harlan (5)	Jefferson (3)	Ames (3)	Tama-Toledo (3)	North Liberty (1)	Tipton (2)	LeClaire (1)
2009	Jul 19-25	XXXVII	442	TBD	Council Bluffs (5)	Red Oak (4)	Greenfield (3)	Indianola (1)	Chariton (2)	Ottumwa (3)	Mount Pleasant (5)	Burlington (5)
2010	Jul 25-31	XXXVIII	450	14,502	Sioux City (6)	Storm Lake (5)	Algona (5)	Clear Lake (3)	Charles City (4)	Waterloo (3)	Manchester (4)	Dubuque (4)
2011	Jul 24-30	XXXIX	454	20,197	Glenwood (6)	Atlantic (6)	Carroll (4)	Boone (4)	Altoona (1)	Grinnell (4)	Coralville (4)	Davenport (3)
2012	Jul 22-28	XL	471	12,981	Sioux Center (4)	Cherokee (5)	Lake View (4)	Webster City (2)	Marshalltown (4)	Cedar Rapids (2)	Anamosa (3)	Clinton (5)
2013	Jul 21-27	XLI	407	10,506	Council Bluffs (6)	Harlan (6)	Perry (5)	Des Moines (5)	Knoxville (3)	Oskaloosa (4)	Fairfield (4)	Fort Madison (5)
2014	Jul 20-26	XLII	418	8,057	Rock Valley (1)	Okoboji (1)ǂ	Emmetsburg (4)	Forest City (4)	Mason City (2)	Waverly (3)	Independence (3)	Guttenberg (5)
2015	Jul 19-25	XLIII	462 (489)	12,879	Sioux City (7)	Storm Lake (6)	Fort Dodge (5)	Eldora (3)	Cedar Falls (4)	Hiawatha (2)	Coralville (5)	Davenport (4)
2016	Jul 24-30	XLIV	417 (452)	16,644	Glenwood (7)	Shenandoah (4)	Creston (3)	Leon (2)	Centerville (2)	Ottumwa (4)	Washington (4)	Muscatine (6)
2017	Jul 23-29	XLV	403 (433)	10,698	Orange City (1)	Spencer (5)	Algona (6)	Clear Lake (4)	Charles City (5)	Cresco (3)	Waukon (1)	Lansing (2)
2018	Jul 22-28	XLVI	432 (450)	12,782	Onawa (6)	Denison (3)	Jefferson (4)	Ames (4)	Newton (3)	Sigourney (3)	Iowa City (2)	Davenport (5)
2019	Jul 21-27	XLVII	446 (499)	15,011	Council Bluffs (7)	Atlantic (7)	Winterset (2)	Indianola (2)	Centerville (3)	Fairfield (5)	Burlington (6)	Keokuk (3)
2020 ǂǂ	----	----	----	----	----	----	----	----	----	----	----	----
2021	Jul 25-31	XLVIII	454 (482)	11,379 (13,086)	Le Mars (2)	Sac City (1)	Fort Dodge (6)	Iowa Falls (4)	Waterloo (4)	Anamosa (4)	DeWitt(1)	Clinton (6)
2022	Jul 24-30	XLIX	462	11,900	Sergeant Bluff (2)	Ida Grove (4)	Pocahontas (1)	Emmetsburg (5)	Mason City (3)	Charles City (6)	West Union (3)	Lansing (3)
2023	Jul 23-29	L	511	17,167	Sioux City (8)	Storm Lake (7)	Carroll (5)	Ames (5)	Des Moines (6)	Tama-Toledo (4)	Coralville (6)	Davenport (6)
2024	Jul 21-27	LI	434	18,375	Glenwood (8)	Red Oak (5)	Atlantic (8)	Winterset (3)	Knoxville (4)	Ottumwa (5)	Mount Pleasant (6)	Burlington (7)
2025	Jul 20-26	LII	406	10,487	Orange City (2)	Milford (1)	Estherville (4)	Forest City (5)	Iowa Falls (5)	Cedar Falls (5)	Oelwein (3)	Guttenberg (6)
2026	Jul 18-25	LIII	391	16,027	Onawa (7)	Harlan (7)	Guthrie Center (3)	Boone (5)	Marshalltown (5)	Independence (4)	Dyersville (3)	Dubuque (5)

(a): Including the "century loop" and other additional "loops".
ǂ: The 2014 overnight Okoboji stay was hosted by five communities: Arnolds Park, Milford, Okoboji, Spirit Lake, and West Okoboji.
ǂǂ: There was no RAGBRAI in 2020 due to the COVID-19 pandemic. The planned 2020 route was used in 2021, with modifications due to overnight town availability changing.

== By city ==
Click on column headings to sort.

City	# of Visits	First year	Most Recent	Years (S=Start, E=End)
Adel	1	1984	1984	1984
Akron	1	1982	1982	1982 (S)
Algona	6	1977	2017	1977, 1990, 1999, 2005, 2010, 2017
Altoona	1	2011	2011	2011
Amana	1	1991	1991	1991
Ames	5	1973	2023	1973, 1983, 2008, 2018, 2023
Anamosa	4	1991	2021	1991, 2002, 2012, 2021
Ankeny	1	2000	2000	2000
Arnolds Parkǂ	1	2014	2014	2014
Atlantic	8	1974	2024	1974, 1980, 1989, 1991, 2001, 2011, 2019, 2024
Audubon	2	1986	2006	1986, 2006
Bedford	2	1992	2003	1992, 2003
Belle Plaine	1	1986	1986	1986
Bellevue	5	1989	2007	1989, 1991, 1999, 2002, 2007 (E, all years)
Bloomfield	2	1997	2003	1997, 2003
Boone	5	1975	2026	1975, 1988, 1998, 2011, 2026
Burlington	7	1979	2024	1979, 1984, 1990, 2000, 2009, 2019, 2024 (E, all years except 2019)
Camp Dodge	1	1974	1974	1974
Carroll	5	1980	2023	1980, 1988, 1994, 2011, 2023
Cedar Falls	5	1989	2025	1989, 1998, 2007, 2015, 2025
Cedar Rapids	2	1990	2012	1990, 2012
Centerville	3	1981	2019	1981, 2016, 2019
Chariton	2	1997	2009	1997, 2009
Charles City	6	1982	2022	1982, 1996, 2002, 2010, 2017, 2022
Cherokee	5	1975	2012	1975, 1982, 1998, 2002, 2012
Clarinda	1	1989	1989	1989
Clarion	2	1983	1993	1983, 1993
Clear Lake	4	1977	2017	1977, 1999, 2010, 2017
Clinton	6	1978	2021	1978, 1985, 1994, 2004, 2012, 2021 (E, all years)
Coralville	6	1995	2023	1995, 2001, 2006, 2011, 2015, 2023
Council Bluffs	7	1974	2019	1974, 1986, 1994, 2000, 2009, 2013, 2019 (S, all years)
Cresco	3	1996	2017	1996, 2005, 2017
Creston	3	1984	2016	1984, 1997, 2016
Davenport	6	1973	2023	1973, 1982, 2011, 2015, 2018, 2023 (E, all years)
Decorah	3	1977	1999	1977, 1993, 1999
Denison	3	1987	2018	1987, 2001, 2018
Des Moines	6	1973	2023	1973, 1988, 1992, 1997, 2013, 2023
DeWitt	1	2021	2021	2021
Dubuque	5	1974	2026	1974, 1983, 1993, 2010, 2026 (E, all years)
Dyersville	3	1989	2026	1989, 2007, 2026
Eldora	3	1986	2015	1986, 1998, 2015
Elkader	1	1980	1980	1980
Emmetsburg	5	1985	2022	1985, 1993, 2002, 2014, 2022
Estherville	4	1982	2025	1982, 1996, 2005, 2025
Fairfield	5	1979	2019	1979, 1988, 1997, 2013, 2019
Fayette	1	1996	1996	1996
Forest City	5	1982	2025	1982, 1987, 2002, 2014, 2025
Fort Dodge	6	1973	2021	1973, 1987, 1995, 2004, 2015, 2021
Fort Madison	5	1975	2013	1975, 1988, 1997, 2003, 2013 (E, all years)
Glenwood	8	1980	2024	1980, 1984, 1989, 1992, 2003, 2011, 2016, 2024 (S, all years)
Greenfield	3	1981	2009	1981, 2000, 2009
Grinnell	4	1976	2011	1976, 1991, 2001, 2011
Grundy Center	1	1983	1983	1983
Guthrie Center	3	1974	1926	1974, 1983, 2026
Guttenberg	6	1980	2025	1980, 1987, 1996, 2005, 2014, 2025 (E, all years)
Hampton	2	1990	2007	1990, 2007
Harlan	7	1976	2026	1976, 1983, 1994, 2000, 2008, 2013, 2026
Hawarden	3	1975	1998	1975, 1985, 1998 (S, all years)
Hiawatha	2	2004	2015	2004, 2015
Humboldt	3	1978	2007	1978, 1985, 2007
Ida Grove	4	1977	2022	1977, 1988, 2006, 2022
Independence	4	1982	2026	1982, 2007, 2014, 2026
Indianola	2	2009	2019	2009, 2019
Iowa City	2	1976	2018	1976, 2018
Iowa Falls	5	1978	2025	1978, 1995, 2004, 2021, 2025
Jefferson	4	1976	2018	1976, 1989, 2008, 2018
Keokuk	3	1981	2019	1981, 1992, 2019 (E, all years)
Keosauqua	1	1981	1981	1981
Knoxville	4	1991	2024	1991, 2000, 2013, 2024
Lake City	1	1981	1981	1981
Lake Mills	1	1996	1996	1996
Lake View	4	1975	2012	1975, 1995, 2004, 2012
Lansing	3	1977	2022	1977, 2017, 2022 (E, all years)
Laurens	1	1977	1977	1977
Le Mars	2	2005	2021	2005, 2021 (S, all years)
LeClaire	1	2008	2008	2008 (E)
Leon	2	1981	2016	1981, 2016
Manchester	4	1983	2010	1983, 1993, 1999, 2010
Mapleton	1	1981	1981	1981
Maquoketa	3	1978	2004	1978, 1994, 2004
Marengo	1	2006	2006	2006
Marion	1	1994	1994	1994
Marshalltown	5	1974	2026	1974, 1994, 2004, 2012, 2026
Mason City	3	1985	2022	1985, 2014, 2022
Milfordǂ	2	2014	2025	2014, 2025
Missouri Valley	4	1981	2008	1981, 1991, 1997, 2008 (S, all years)
Monticello	3	1974	1998	1974, 1985, 1998
Mount Pleasant	6	1975	2024	1975, 1984, 1992, 2003, 2009, 2024
Mount Vernon	1	1978	1978	1978
Muscatine	6	1976	2016	1976, 1986, 1995, 2001, 2006, 2016 (E, all years)
Nevada	1	1976	1976	1976
New Hampton	1	1977	1977	1977
Newton	3	1975	2018	1975, 2006, 2018
North Liberty	1	2008	2008	2008
Northwood	1	2005	2005	2005
Oelwein	3	1990	2025	1990, 2002, 2025
Okobojiǂ	1	2014	2014	2014
Onawa	7	1977	2026	1977, 1983, 1987, 1995, 2004, 2018, 2026 (S, all years)
Orange City	2	2017	2025	2017, 2025 (S, all years)
Osage	2	1987	1993	1987, 1993
Osceola	2	1992	2003	1992, 2003
Oskaloosa	4	1988	2013	1988, 1992, 2003, 2013
Ottumwa	5	1984	2024	1984, 2000, 2009, 2016, 2024
Pella	1	1984	1984	1984
Perry	5	1980	2013	1980, 1986, 1994, 2001, 2013
Pocahontas	1	2022	2022	2022
Red Oak	5	1976	2024	1976, 1986, 1997, 2009, 2024
Rock Rapids	3	1979	2007	1979, 1999, 2007 (S, all years)
Rock Valley	1	2014	2014	2014 (S)
Rockwell City	2	1979	1998	1979, 1998
Sabula	1	1998	1998	1998 (E)
Sac City	1	2021	2021	2021
Sergeant Bluff	2	2006	2022	2006, 2022 (S, all years)
Sheldon	2	1993	2005	1993, 2005
Shenandoah	4	1984	2016	1984, 1992, 2003, 2016
Sibley	2	1985	1996	1985, 1996
Sidney	1	1976	1976	1976 (S)
Sigourney	3	1975	2018	1975, 1995, 2018
Sioux Center	4	1990	2012	1990, 1996, 2002, 2012 (S, all years)
Sioux City	8	1973	2023	1973, 1978, 1988, 1993, 2001, 2010, 2015, 2023 (S, all years)
Spencer	5	1979	2017	1979, 1990, 1999, 2007, 2017
Spirit Lakeǂ	1	2014	2014	2014
Storm Lake	7	1973	2023	1973, 1978, 1987, 2001, 2010, 2015, 2023
Story City	2	1979	1989	1979, 1989
Tama/Toledo	4	1979	2023	1979, 1995, 2008, 2023
Tipton	2	1982	2008	1982, 2008
Vinton	1	1978	1978	1978
Wapello	1	1979	1979	1979
Washington	4	1986	2016	1986, 1990, 2000, 2016
Waterloo	4	1974	2021	1974, 1985, 2010, 2021
Waukee	1	2006	2006	2006
Waukon	1	2017	2017	2017
Waverly	3	1980	2014	1980, 1999, 2014
Webster City	2	1980	2012	1980, 2012
West Okobojiǂ	1	2014	2014	2014
West Union	3	1987	2022	1987, 2005, 2022
Williamsburg	1	1973	1973	1973
Winterset	3	1991	2024	1991, 2019, 2024

ǂ: The 2014 overnight Okoboji stay was hosted by five communities: Spirit Lake, Okoboji, Arnolds Park, West Okoboji and Milford
