= Dora Rinehart =

American cyclist

Dora Rinehart was an American cyclist from Colorado, who gained a reputation as "America's Greatest Cyclienne" for her long-distance riding in the mid-1890s.

Rinehart took up cycling in 1894, even though society at that time discouraged female riders. In 1896 she famously rode more than 100 100-mile rides. She commented that "I do not like to go on a hard run when my husband is with me, for you know it does take so much starch out of a man to ride the century."

In June 1894 she addressed the 24th Annual Convention of the Colorado State Medical Society in Denver. On the agenda were presentations titled, "The New Movement in Dress Reform" and "Bicycle Exercise for Women." She is quoted as saying: "Just to give you an idea of the benefits of a divided skirt, it is almost impossible for a lady to ride any distance…with the ordinary skirt. You get too much of the dress on the one side of the wheel, and you do not get enough of the dress on the other side."
