= RAGBRAI =

Annual organized bicycle ride in Iowa

Register's Annual Great Bicycle Ride Across Iowa
- Event logo
- Nickname: RAGBRAI
- Status: Active
- Frequency: Annual
- Venue: Varies
- Locations: Iowa, United States
- Country: United States
- Years active: 53
- Inaugurated: August 26, 1973
- Founder: John Karras; Donald Kaul
- Participants: 30,000
- Major events: Bicycle touring
- Leader: Matt Phippen (director)
- Sponsor: The Des Moines Register
- Website: Official website

RAGBRAI, short for Register's Annual Great Bicycle Ride Across Iowa, is a non-competitive bicycle tour across the U.S. state of Iowa from its western to eastern border. First held in 1973, RAGBRAI is the largest bike-touring event in the world.

== Description ==
Each year's route begins at a community near Iowa's western border and ends at a community near the eastern border, with stops in towns across the state. The ride is one week long and ends on the last Saturday of July each year. The earliest possible starting date is July 19, and the latest is July 25.

While formerly a lottery was held to select participants, as of 2021 registration is now on a first-come-first-serve basis. Iowa bicycle clubs and charters, as well as teams and groups, many of whom are from out of state, also receive a number of passes for which members apply through those organizations. Despite the official limits, unregistered riders have on many days swelled the actual number of riders to well over the registered number count.

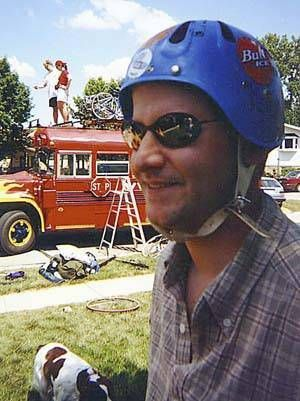
Davis, a long-time RAGBRAI attendee from Iowa

The length of the entire week's route over RAGBRAI's first 40 years from 1973 through 2012, not including the Century Loop, averaged 467.9 miles (753.0 km); the average daily distance between host communities is 67.1 miles (108.0 km). Eight "host communities" are selected each year, one each for the beginning and end points, the other six serving as overnight stops from Sunday through Friday for the bicyclists. At the beginning of the ride, participants traditionally dip the rear wheels of their bikes in either the Missouri River or the Big Sioux River; at the end, riders dip their front wheels in the Mississippi River.

=== Overnight stops ===
The ride has passed through all 99 of Iowa's counties in its history. Fourteen different communities have served as the starting point, while 12 have hosted the finish. 108 other communities have been overnight hosts during the week of the ride.

An event known as the RAGBRAI Route Announcement Party is held the last part of January to release the names of the overnight towns. The route is fleshed out in the following weeks and is announced in the Des Moines Register and on the RAGBRAI website in early March.

== History ==
=== The Great Six-Day Bicycle Ride (1973) ===
RAGBRAI began in 1973, when Des Moines Register feature writers John Karras and Donald Kaul decided to go on a bicycle ride across Iowa; both men were avid cyclists. Karras challenged Kaul to do the ride and write articles about what he experienced. Kaul agreed to do it, but only if Karras also did the ride. Karras then agreed to ride, as well.

The newspaper's management approved of the plan. Don Benson, a public-relations director at the Register, was assigned to coordinate the event. Upon the suggestion of Ed Heins, the managing editor, the writers invited the public to accompany them.

The ride was planned to start on Sunday, August 26 in Sioux City and end in Davenport on Friday, August 31. The overnight stops were Storm Lake, Fort Dodge, Ames, Des Moines, and Williamsburg. The Register informed readers of the event and the planned route. The ride was informally referred to as "the Great Six-Day Bicycle Ride".

Some 300 cyclists began the ride in Sioux City; 114 of them rode the entire route. A number of other people rode part of the route. Attendance was light the first year. The ride was announced with only six weeks' notice and it conflicted with both the first week of school and the final weekend of the Iowa State Fair.

After the ride was over, Kaul and Karras wrote numerous articles that captured the imaginations of many readers. Among those who completed the 1973 ride was 83-year-old Clarence Pickard of Indianola. He rode a used ladies Schwinn and wore a long-sleeved shirt, trousers, woolen long underwear, and a silver pith helmet. He said that the underwear blocked out the sun and kept his skin cool. The newspaper received many calls and letters from people who wanted to go on the ride, but were unable to for various reasons. Because of this public response and demand, a second ride was scheduled for August 4–10, 1974, before the Iowa State Fair.

=== Second year: SAGBRAI, August 4–10, 1974 ===
The 1974 ride, known as the Second Annual Great Bicycle Ride Across Iowa (or SAGBRAI), was more carefully planned. For example, each morning, the official start time was 7:30 am; however, by Wednesday, the start time was dropped so that riders could depart at any time that was appropriate for the rider. The Iowa State Patrol was involved for the first time to control traffic and assure safety, and arrangements were made to have medical services available for riders. For the first time, the route was driven in advance for inspection purposes. The start of the ride was in Council Bluffs, had overnight stops in Atlantic, Guthrie Center, Camp Dodge (near Des Moines), Marshalltown, Waterloo, and Monticello, and finished in the riverfront city of Dubuque. The ride occurred in the same week as the resignation of President Richard M. Nixon. The high point of the trip for many of the riders was the second overnight stop, where a sign greeted the riders outside of the designated overnight town, Guthrie Center. It read, "Please be kind. You outnumber us two to one." About a half hour in length, SAGBRAI – the Second Annual Great Bike Ride Across Iowa is a black and white documentary film about the 1974 ride. OHP Marketing Services of Webster City, Iowa, converted the 16-mm film to a digital format in 2012, and the digital format was screened in Webster City on Monday July 13, 2015.

=== As RAGBRAI annual event ===
After the second year, the ride continued to grow in popularity. Michael Gartner, then the editor of the Register, directed John Karras to include the word "Register" in the ride title; thus the RAGBRAI name, with Roman numerals following it, was adopted for RAGBRAI III in 1975 (the 2012 ride was RAGBRAI XL). RAGBRAI V, from Onawa to Lansing, was the shortest in RAGBRAI history at 400 miles (640 km) until 2026. Until 2014, it also had the fewest feet in vertical hill climbing. Beginning in 1978, RAGBRAI included an optional 100-mile century ride to offer a greater challenge. The second day of RAGBRAI IX came to be known as "Soggy Monday" and is generally regarded as the worst weather day in RAGBRAI history. To commemorate it, the Register marketed a bicycle patch. Beginning with RAGBRAI X, the dates were moved to the last full week in July, starting on Sunday and ending on Saturday. This ride was also the last for Donald Kaul as co-host; he had ridden with John Karras on the first ten rides. Chuck Offenburger, writer of the Register's "Iowa Boy" column, joined Karras as co-host in 1983.

With XIV, RAGBRAI introduced a Century Loop. While the day's ride might be shorter, a loop was included on the route for cyclists who wanted to ride 100 miles (160 km). This ride went from Council Bluffs to Muscatine, and the optional loop was on the day between Perry and Eldora. The loop was renamed the "Karras Loop" in 2001, in honor of John Karras. On the XXIII ride, the day from Tama-Toledo to Sigourney featured a strong south headwind, much heat and humidity, and many hills. The day came to be known as "Saggy Thursday". After the XXV ride, which passed through Lucas County, RAGBRAI in its history had gone through all of Iowa's 99 counties. John Karras retired as co-host after RAGBRAI XXVIII in 2000, which began at Council Bluffs and ended at Burlington. He died November 10th, 2021, and the 2022 ride (XLIX) featured a 100-mile plus day instead of the Karras Loop.

RAGBRAI XLIII in 2015 was the first to feature an optional gravel loop. The loop was in honor of Steve Hed, the Minnesotan founder of HED Cycling Products and wheel innovator, who had died the previous November. The first gravel loop was part of the second-day ride from Storm Lake to Fort Dodge. Also, the 43rd ride was the first since the initial ride in 1973 to start in Sioux City and end in Davenport. In 2016, the "Mile of Silence", which remembers the riders who have been lost throughout the years, was started.

=== Organizational Changes and rebirth ===
In late 2019, following a controversy with reporting by the Des Moines Register newsroom ride director T.J. Juskiewicz and his staff abruptly resigned and attempted to start their own rival ride, Iowa's Ride. In 2020, both RAGBRAI XLVIII and Iowa's Ride was postponed for a year due to the COVID-19 pandemic. Iowa's Ride never advanced past initial planning and Juskiewicz is no longer in Iowa.

In 2020, as part of the reorganization of the larger Gannett company following its acquisition by New Media, RAGBRAI was moved from being a part of the Des Moines Register to part of its Ventures Endurance division. New leadership used the time given to them by the pandemic to properly organize a new ride.

The rescheduled ride began on July 25, 2021, in Le Mars and ended July 31 in Clinton. The route stopped in Sac City, Fort Dodge, Iowa Falls, Waterloo, Anamosa, and DeWitt. The planned 2020 route had included overnight stops in Storm Lake and Maquoketa, but were replaced by Sac City and DeWitt, respectively, for the 2021 route.

Following the 2022 ride, RAGBRAI further distanced itself from the Des Moines Register by moving into its own office and warehouse building in Des Moines' East Village.

Since the move to Venture's Endurance leadership, the ride no longer has a cap of 10,000 riders. Additionally, RAGBRAI now contributes $50,000 to each overnight town and $10,000 to each pass through town to help with expenses. RAGBRAI Gives also fundraises for a charity with Iowa ties every year.

=== 50th Ride and Beyond ===
The 50th ride, RAGBRAI L, took place from July 23-29, 2023, and retraced much of the first year's route. Carroll replaced Fort Dodge and the much larger town/area of Coralville-Iowa City replaced the small town of Williamsburg. The ride from Ames to Des Moines had over 60,000 riders, the most riders of any stop in the history of the event.

In 2024, the tour would travel through Greenfield, a city that had been devastated by an EF4 tornado two months prior. This included damaged areas of the city, with debris cleanup being done by volunteers before the event.

The 2025 ride featured the first time the ride left Iowa. The ride went into Southern Minnesota for a 15 mile stretch, including a stop at Brown Park.

== Event Organization ==
RAGBRAI currently has a full time staff of seven plus several part time employees, contractors, and other volunteers who help put on the ride each year known as the RAGBRAI Crew.

Planning for each year's ride begins in September with tours across the state, meetings with the Iowa State Patrol, and with the Iowa Department of Transportation to determine the route. Staff will cross the state 20 times or more over the course of the year plotting, planning, and executing the route. The overnight towns for the route are publicly announced at the route announcement party in late January.

In February, staff begin meeting with the overnight towns while finalizing pass through towns. The pass through towns are formally announced in early April with meetings with those towns occurring in April and May.

During the first week of June, RAGBRAI staff will pre-ride the entire route on their bicycles to ensure the route is in an acceptable condition for riders as well as to meet with towns along the way to ensure their preparations are on schedule. Staff are in constant communication with the Iowa Department of Transportation, counties, and host communities to identify any construction projects or other issues that could derail the planned ride.

The ride itself is always scheduled for the last full week of July.

In August, staff makes one final trip across the state to meet with the hosting towns to debrief what went right and what could be improved upon for future rides. RAGBRAI celebrates the end of the cycling season with a fall ride across the Des Moines area, starting and ending at their headquarters building, before fully turning the focus to the next ride.

== Notable incidents ==
=== Deaths ===
Over the first 42 years of the ride (through 2014), 30 deaths of ride participants or volunteers have officially occurred during the week of RAGBRAI because of accidents or injuries suffered on the ride. Although the event began in 1973, the first death did not occur until RAGBRAI XII in 1984. Many of the deaths were due to heart attacks that riders suffered while resting. However, in Sheldon on the first night of the 2005 ride, a weather-related fatality occurred as Michael Thomas Burke (a native of Donnellson, Iowa and an industrial engineering graduate from the University of Iowa, who was living in New York City) died when a storm caused a tree limb to fall on him as he was sleeping in a tent.

Only a few deaths resulted from injuries sustained while actually riding on bicycles. The first was in 1987, when 19-year-old John Boyle of Rockwell City was run over by a flatbed trailer. On Monday, July 30, 2007, at 12:52 pm, a Waterloo man, who was rescued from the Wapsipinicon River in Independence, subsequently died; 62-year-old Rich Droste had been participating in RAGBRAI, which made an overnight stop in Independence on Thursday. Droste was swimming in the Wapsi when he apparently got caught in the current upstream from the dam. On July 25, 2009, Donald D. Myers from Rolla, Missouri, died of injuries sustained in a crash at the bottom of the hill near Geode Lake dam at Geode State Park. On July 30, 2010, Stephen Briggs of Waverly, Iowa died after his bike clipped the tire of another bike and he was thrown from his bike.

After Briggs' death, no more fatalities occurred until 2014, when on Monday, July 21, Tom Teesdale, 62, of West Branch died of a heart attack between Terril and Graettinger, and on Wednesday, July 23, 74-year old George 'Frank' Brinkerhoff of Sioux City died of natural causes and was found dead in his tent Thursday morning.

On Sunday, July 24, 2016, at the 2-mile marker on US Highway 34 near Glenwood, Wayne Ezell, 72, of Jacksonville, Florida, was westbound when a pickup truck driven by Robb Philippus, 34, of Glenwood, hit him from behind about 6:40 am. Ezell, who died from his injuries sustained during the accident, was a rider participating in RAGBRAI XLIV. Also, in 2016, on the Tuesday of RAGBRAI XLIV, a 60-year-old RAGBRAI rider, Clifton Kahler, had a heart attack while riding along Highway 2 between Creston and Leon and died.

In 2023 on RAGBRAI L, a rider in his 50s had a medical emergency while riding his bicycle on the route on Tuesday day 3 of RAGBRAI between Carroll and Ames near the intersection of J Avenue and 270th Street in Boone County at approximately 1:16 p.m. but did not survive after being transported in an ambulance from the scene.

During RAGBRAI LII in 2025, two deaths occurred. On Monday July 21, 2025, which was day 2 of RAGBRAI LII, 62-year old Mark R. Spoo of Colorado collapsed at 8:15 am while riding his bicycle on the RAGBRAI route in Jackson County, Minnesota, west of MN 86 on Jackson County Road 4. Within seconds, he was immediately attended by a doctor, surgeon, and a physician's assistant, who were all RAGBRAI riders, and was transported by Lakefield Ambulance Service to the nearby Lakes Regional Medical Center at Spirit Lake, Iowa, where he was pronounced dead. On Tuesday morning July 22, 2025, which was day 3 of RAGBRAI LII, 63-year old Thomas McCarthy of Arizona, who was a RAGBRAI rider riding the RAGBRAI route, was vomiting near South 8th Street and 1st Avenue South in central Estherville, Iowa. Police officers were notified at 7:40 am, but, when they arrived, the victim was unconscious and had no pulse. McCarthy received CPR and an automated external defibrillator (AED) was administered to revive him at the scene. He was transported by the Estherville Ambulance Service to nearby Avera Holy Family Hospital in Estherville where he was pronounced dead.

A plane carrying a pilot and a young Canadian woman who was making a documentary about the ride crashed during the course of the 2005 RAGBRAI. In this case, the pair suffered minor injuries. Pilot Jim Hill of Manchester, Iowa, and Amy Throop of Ottawa, Canada, were following the route on a plane near Riceville, Iowa, when the plane went down. Both Hill and Throop walked away from the accident. Throughout the ride, ultralights have flown over riders a few feet above the trees to get good shots of the riders.

=== Crawford County lawsuit and ban ===
During 2004's RAGBRAI XXXII, Kirk Ullrich was thrown from his bicycle after contacting a crack in the center of the road and died. Ullrich's widow Betty Jo Ullrich sued Crawford County and settled for $350,000. The board of supervisors for Crawford County banned RAGBRAI (and other, similar events) to avoid future liability. As of December 2008, however, Crawford County supervisors voted to rescind this ban after the RAGBRAI organizers took steps to indemnify third parties in the case of such events in the future.

=== 2013 sinkhole along XLI route ===
On May 31, 2013, a large sinkhole, at least 20 feet (6 m) wide by 5 feet (1.5 m) deep, occurred along Iowa Highway 384 (160th Road in Guthrie County) under the asphalt at the entrance of Springbrook State Park, which is near the boat ramp at the base of Mockingbird Hill. The Iowa Department of Natural Resources (DNR) contacted the Iowa Department of Transportation, which deemed the sinkhole to be unsafe. The Iowa DNR immediately evacuated the campers at Springbrook. In the spring (March, April, and May) of 2013, according to Harry Hillaker, the state of Iowa climatologist, Iowa had the wettest spring on record. The record precipitation, both rainfall and snowfall, contributed to the formation of the sinkhole. On June 3, 2013, the RAGBRAI XLI route inspection preride assessed the sinkhole in considering changes to the route through Springbrook and up Mockingbird Hill, the steepest hill on any RAGBRAI route; however, no changes to the RAGBRAI XLI route were made.

== Food vendors ==
During RAGBRAI, food and drink are available in campgrounds, churches, and restaurants, and along the route. Vendors who are officially sanctioned are identified by a sign reading, OFFICIAL RAGBRAI VENDOR. Perhaps the most famed vendor in RAGBRAI history was Paul Bernhard, who along the day's route at a rural location sold corn on the cob and pork chops that were basted in melted butter and grilled over charcoal. He began selling chops at RAGBRAI in 1985 and retired after the 2008 ride, leaving the vendorship to his son, Matt. In 1996, he sold 2500 chops in his hometown of Bancroft, Iowa, when the ride passed through there. He was called Mr. Pork Chop and was known for his cry of "Pooooork Chooooooooooop!" He died at age 88.

== Teams and charters ==
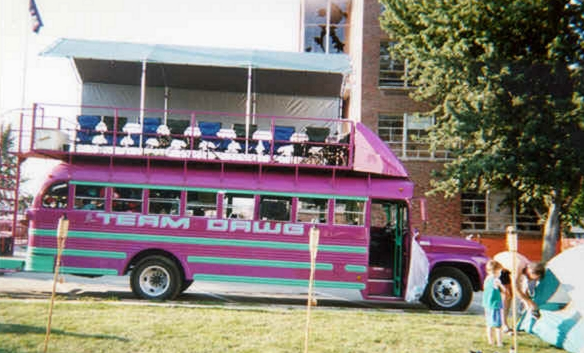
An example of a RAGBRAI team bus

Riders come from all over the world, and many ride as clubs or teams. Dozens of organized teams go on the ride. In 2007 and 2008, Lance Armstrong organized a LIVESTRONG team of about 200 riders and participated in RAGBRAI; each rider raised $1000 or more towards fighting cancer.

Teams create a social and support system that adds a noncycling dimension to RAGBRAI. While some of the teams have a well-earned reputation for hard partying and heavy drinking, most are serious bicyclists. Teams often customize old school buses and vans. The team buses serve as transportation to and from the ride, and a combination clubhouse and sleeping quarters during the ride. These buses typically sport enormous custom stereos, roof mounted, rail-equipped platforms, which serve as bicycle racks and a place to relax, and interior bathrooms. Several carry 55-gallon plastic water barrels, which become warm during the day. Attached to a gravity-fed hose, they provide teams with a spartan shower at the end of the day's ride.

Teams often conform their clothing or partake in certain gimmicks to add levity to the ride and make team members easily identifiable. This can be as simple as wearing identical cycling jerseys with the team logo or various wacky traditions such as purple “troll hair” wigs (Team Spin). Gimmicks include adorning road kill along the route with Mardi Gras beads (Team Road Kill) and various drinking games. Many teams also produce logoed team paraphernalia to distribute and trade with other teams (stickers, bracelets, or can koozies being common items).

Charters are bicycle clubs and for-profit companies that provide weeklong support for riders. For a fee, charters typically transport riders to and from the ride, secure preferred camping areas, rent and sometimes pitch tents, provide some bicycle repair services, and offer additional evening social activities. Charters are a common option for riders coming from outside Iowa.

== Media exposure ==
RAGBRAI has had nationwide media exposure, and other rides based on RAGBRAI have been started in other areas of the country. Bil Gilbert, after riding in SAGBRAI, wrote an enthusiastic report that appeared in Sports Illustrated. After Gilbert's essay, additional writers with Sports Illustrated have mentioned RAGBRAI over the years. In April 1984, Fredric Dannen wrote an article for the Saturday Evening Post. Harry Smith of CBS This Morning rode part of RAGBRAI XXV in 1997 and aired a report. In addition, numerous articles about the ride have appeared over the years in The Wall Street Journal. Following RAGBRAI XLVII in August 2019, Lonely Planet listed RAGBRAI as one of the top 50 bicycle rides in both North America and South America combined in the book Epic Bike Rides of the Americas. The book includes Dennis Coello's picture of a brightly colored support vehicle with the lyrics to The B-52's song "Love Shack" on the side. The Iowa Falls middle school principal Jeff Burchfield's Team Love Shack RAGBRAI bus supports the group of about 20 riders. This particular team was established with about 5 or 6 riders in 2007 for RAGBRAI XXXV. In 2010, for RAGBRAI XXXVIII, Burchfield purchased an old school bus as the support vehicle for Team Love Shack and had the bus painted accordingly. Although RAGBRAI XLVIII was postponed from 2020 until 2021 because of the Coronavirus pandemic, news media covered Team Love Shack of Hardin County and especially the Eldora, Iowa area participating in an unofficial ride along the XLVIII route during July 2020. Also in August 2019, CNN featured a travel story "RAGBRAI: A newbie's guide to cycling across Iowa" by Christi Scott. The Friday September 19, 2026, episode of Nightline included the segment "Iowa Rolls" in which Tara Corduan and ABC News producer Glenn Ruppel rode and covered the entire RAGBRAI LIII route in the summer of 2026.

A documentary was made for the 50th ride in 2023 entitled "Shift". The film was showcased across Iowa and was also broadcast on Iowa PBS.

== Celebrities and athletes ==
Ben Davidson, former professional football star player mainly with the Oakland Raiders, rode on RAGBRAI for several years, beginning in 1987. Lance Armstrong rode the Wednesday and Thursday stages in 2006, speaking to a large throng of the riders in Newton. He then completed most of the 2007 ride before leaving a couple of days early to support Team Discovery's Alberto Contador and his Tour de France victory. In 2008, Armstrong also made an appearance on the Ames, Iowa, leg of the trip. In 2011, 2013, 2014, 2017, and 2018, he again participated. Ottumwa-born actor/comedian Tom Arnold has ridden a few RAGBRAIs, including XXIV in 1996. Other participants have included three-time Tour de France champ Greg LeMond, columnist Dave Barry, NASCAR drivers Matt Kenseth and Jimmie Johnson, Motocross champion Ryan Dungey, 2004 Democratic presidential candidate Howard Dean and former Secretary of the Interior Bruce Babbitt. Colorado governor and Democratic Presidential candidate John Hickenlooper rode in the 2019 ride. Hickenlooper, his spouse and his crew joined Team Skunk in Indianola where he provided a keg of his signature beer while using the shower of the host home. In 2025 on RAGBRAI LII, NBA hall of famer David Robinson rode RAGBRAI on Day 4 and 5, which were Wednesday, July 23, and Thursday, July 24.

== See also ==
- Challenge riding
- List of RAGBRAI overnight stops
- Tour of the Scioto River Valley (TOSRV), a large two day bicycle tour started in 1962.
