= Propel ATL =

Advocacy group in Atlanta, GA

- Predecessor: Atlanta Bicycle Coalition (1991–2021); Pedestrians Educating Drivers on Safety (1996–2021)
- Formation: June 17, 2021; 5 years ago
- Type: 501(c)(3) nonprofit organization
- Purpose: Sustainable transportation advocacy
- Headquarters: Atlanta, Georgia, U.S.
- Region served: Atlanta metropolitan area
- Executive director: Rebecca Serna
- Website: www.letspropelatl.org
- Formerly called: Atlanta Bicycle Coalition (2021–2022)

Propel ATL is a sustainable transportation advocacy group based in Atlanta, Georgia, that advocates for safer streets for people who walk, bike, ride transit, or use mobility devices. The organization was formed through the June 2021 merger of the Atlanta Bicycle Coalition (ABC) and Pedestrians Educating Drivers on Safety (PEDS), and was renamed Propel ATL in May 2022. ABC was founded in 1991 to "create a healthier, more livable Atlanta by making it safer, easier, and more attractive to bicycle for fun, fitness, and transportation," while PEDS was founded in 1996 by Sally Flocks to make Georgia communities safer for people on foot. In 2019, ABC adopted a strategic plan expanding its advocacy from cycling to all forms of sustainable transportation, a shift formalized by the PEDS merger and 2022 rebrand. As of 2024, Propel ATL's executive director is Rebecca Serna, who previously led ABC.

== History ==
The Atlanta Bicycle Coalition was founded in 1991, and Pedestrians Educating Drivers on Safety was founded in 1996 by Sally Flocks, who led the organization for 23 years before retiring in 2019. In 2020, the two organizations partnered on a campaign that led the City of Atlanta to adopt a Vision Zero traffic-safety resolution. ABC and PEDS formally merged on June 17, 2021, and the combined organization adopted the name Propel ATL in May 2022, announced at the organization's annual "Blinkie Awards" ceremony.

== Programs, initiatives, and events ==
One of the highest profile programs sponsored by Propel ATL is called Share the Road. This public awareness program aims to educate both cyclists and motorists that shared use of the road is safest and most enjoyable for all. Propel ATL also teaches Effective Cycling classes as part of its work to educate the public on the benefits of cycling. In addition, Propel ATL offers a number of services, like bicycle counts, bicycle valets for events, and bicycle rack projects (in cooperation with Sopo Bicycle Co-op).

=== Atlanta Streets Alive ===
Propel ATL helped originate Atlanta Streets Alive, a ciclovía—a temporary closure of streets to automobile traffic for activities such as bicycling, roller-skating, jogging, strolling, scootering, or skipping—inspired by similar open-streets events in Bogotá, Colombia. The event originally ran mostly along Edgewood Avenue in Downtown Atlanta and the Old Fourth Ward, with a kickoff at Woodruff Park and free group activities including tango, yoga, soccer, hula hooping, and break dancing.

Following a four-year hiatus during the COVID-19 pandemic, the event returned in September 2023 with a route along Peachtree Street between downtown and 15th Street in Midtown, which has drawn crowds estimated at over 100,000 in past years. As of 2026, the event is presented by the Atlanta Department of Transportation with support from Propel ATL and rotates among several routes: the Peachtree Street route between downtown and Midtown, a route along Ralph David Abernathy Boulevard and Georgia Avenue between West End and Grant Park, and a route along Martin Luther King Jr. Drive between the Beltline's Westside Trail and South Downtown introduced that year. A Howell Mill Road date held in partnership with the Westside Stride street festival has also appeared on recent schedules.

=== The Mobile Social ===
Founded in March 2011, The Mobile Social is a monthly, no-drop, group bicycle ride sponsored by the Atlanta Bicycle Coalition. In response to the Critical Mass cycling events, members of the Atlanta Bicycle Coalition developed a social ride that is formal, organized, and aims to promote the following initiatives:

- Get more people on bikes.
- Explore Atlanta (west to east, north to south).
- Support and love local businesses.
- Create community through cycling.

Propel ATL has gathered a broad range of resources to provide information about riding safely on city streets.

=== Blinkie Awards ===
Propel ATL hosts an annual awards ceremony known as the Blinkie Awards, recognizing individuals, organizations, and public officials for contributions to street safety and sustainable transportation in Atlanta. Past honorees have included a transit advocacy group recognized for a survey of bus-stop conditions and a neighborhood association recognized for pedestrian-safety organizing.

== Advocacy and policy work ==
Since the 2021 merger, Propel ATL has expanded its policy advocacy to include oversight of the Atlanta Department of Transportation (ATLDOT), the city agency created in 2019. The organization hosts an annual Transportation Roundtable that brings advocates together with members of the Atlanta City Council to discuss transportation infrastructure and funding. Propel ATL has also organized candidate forums on transportation issues during Atlanta City Council elections and has advocated for pedestrian- and cyclist-safety improvements to be included in city street-resurfacing projects.

== See also ==
- Cycling in Atlanta
- List of United States bicycle advocacy organizations
