= Donald Kaul =

American journalist (1934 – 2018)

- Born: December 25, 1934; Detroit, Michigan, U.S.
- Died: July 22, 2018 (aged 83); Washington, D.C., U.S.
- Occupation: Journalist

Donald William Kaul (December 25, 1934 – July 22, 2018) was an American journalist, best known for his syndicated columns and his work with The Des Moines Register and OtherWords.

== Education and career ==
Kaul earned a bachelor's degree from the University of Michigan in 1958 and a master's degree in journalism in 1960. He was a finalist for the Pulitzer Prize for Commentary in 1987 and 1999. Kaul wrote columns for The Des Moines Register for over 35 years before retiring in 2000. His work was recognized for its liberal perspective, particularly in Iowa. In 2001, he resumed writing for OtherWords, a non-profit editorial service focused on progressive commentary. His final column was published in 2017.

Kaul co-founded The Des Moines Register's Annual Weeklong Bike Ride Across Iowa, RAGBRAI. It began in 1973 with a column by Kaul, who launched the ride with John Karras, another Register writer.

Around 1963, Kaul began contributing to The Register's Over the Coffee column, taking it over full-time in the spring of 1965. In 1970, the newspaper assigned him to its Washington, D.C., bureau. In 1983, following editorial changes under James Gannon, Kaul left The Register. He subsequently wrote for the Cedar Rapids Gazette, and his columns were syndicated nationally. In 1989, after Geneva Overholser became the editor of The Register, she reinstated Kaul as a columnist.

In 2012, Emily Schwartz Greco, his editor at Other Words, described Kaul as a columnist with a broad range, stating that he wrote about topics including football, economics, racism, and military spending.

Kaul wrote that Richard Nixon "is to shifty what Larry Bird is to basketball" in a 1986 column for The Register. Kaul teased Iowa girls' basketball for its slow pace, suggesting it be timed with an "hour glass" and saying it drove crowds "delirious with apathy." Describing riders of RAGBRAI as "my kind of people," he explained: "They come for a little fun and to see whether it's true what they say about coronaries. They're not into finishing first; they're into finishing."

A Washingtonian magazine poll of the nation's 200 largest newspapers voted Kaul "the most underrated syndicated columnist." In 1984, he was a keynote speaker at Drake University Law School's Supreme Court Celebration Banquet. In the 1980s, he was a commentator on National Public Radio. One Iowa columnist called him "the George Will or Rush Limbaugh of the left."

Noting the political benefits of military contracts scattered by design among many congressional districts, Kaul wrote, "Congress has its faults—it is for the most part cowardly, venal, and self-aggrandizing—but give it this: it is absolutely ingenious in its efforts to protect the military budget from the scourge of peace."

Kaul suffered a heart attack on July 4, 2012, after eating a hot dog, deviating from his semi-vegan diet. He still met a deadline, filing a column three days later, but observed, "Life is full of little ironies, some of which will kill you."

The Sandy Hook Elementary massacre spurred his call for ending gun violence. "Repeal the Second Amendment, the part about guns anyway", he wrote, urging that the NRA be declared a terrorist organization and that owning an unlicensed assault rifle be made a felony.

"If some people refused to give up their guns, that 'prying the guns from their cold, dead hand's thing works for me," he went on. "Then I would tie Mitch McConnell and John Boehner our esteemed Republican leaders to the back of a Chevy pickup and drag them around a parking lot until they saw the light on gun control."

Protests followed, led by anti-gun control activists who flooded his email and phone with messages. Kaul explained he was writing satirically about the GOP leaders, but to little avail. "Perhaps my column jumped the shark a bit", he said. "I was angry. But worse would have been to watch those little bodies being carried out of the Newtown school, shrug, and say, 'Gee, that's terrible. We're going to have to do something about that someday if the NRA approves.' That would have been immoral."

== Personal life ==
Kaul was born on December 25, 1934, in Detroit, Michigan.

On January 11, 2018, Kaul revealed that the cancer in his prostate had spread and that he would no longer take treatments. Kaul maintained both an acceptance and rejection of his diagnosis, stating the following:

"There’s a certain air of unreality about it," Kaul said in January about his outlook. "Because you can’t imagine what life is going to be to other people when you’re not there anymore. So, while I accept that this is coming on me, I don’t really accept it. It’s a curious thing. I don’t walk around depressed."

He died later in 2018.
