= Atlanta Streets Alive =

Open streets car-free ciclovia festival in Georgia, U.S.

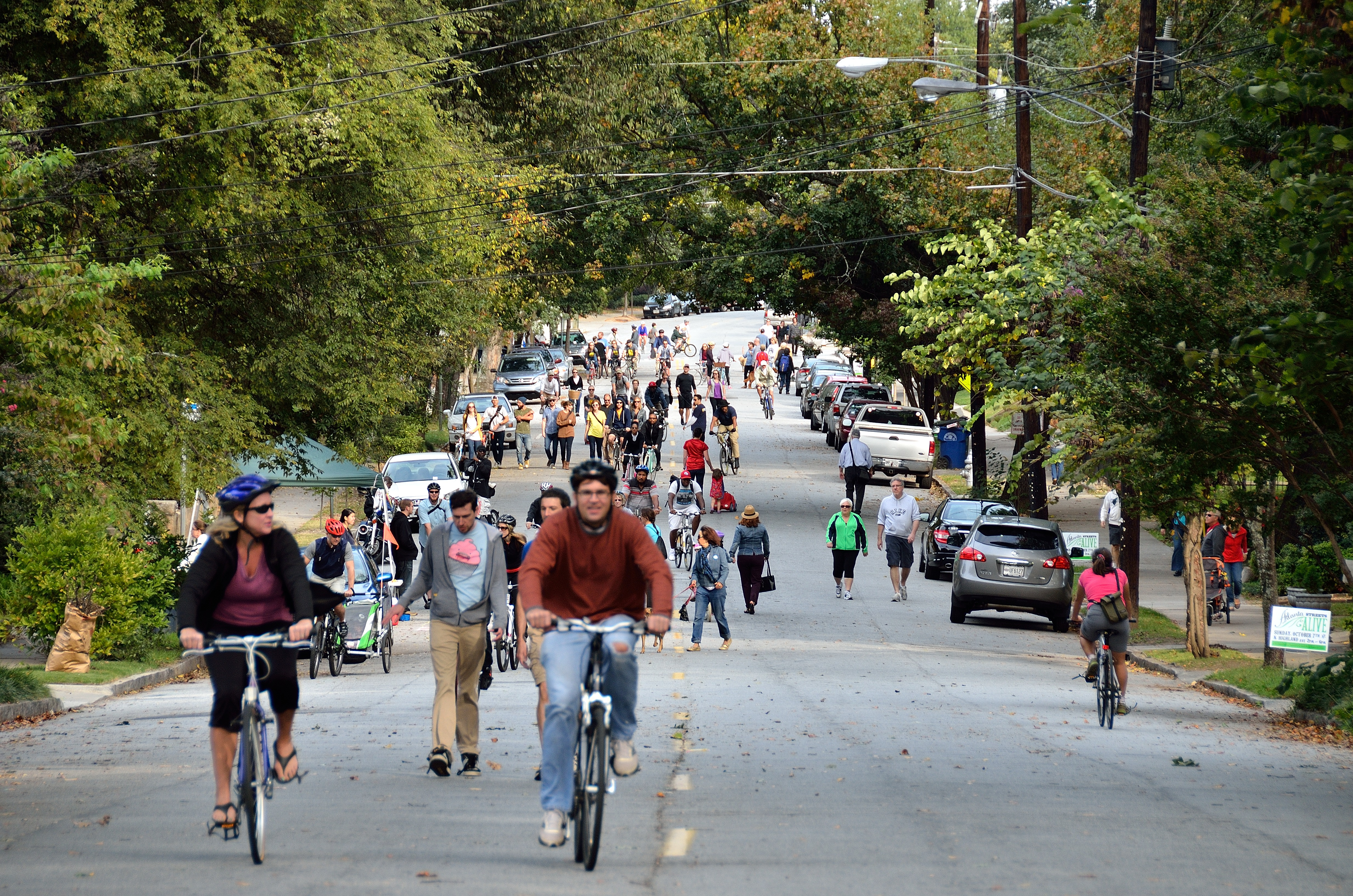
Virginia Avenue during Atlanta Streets Alive

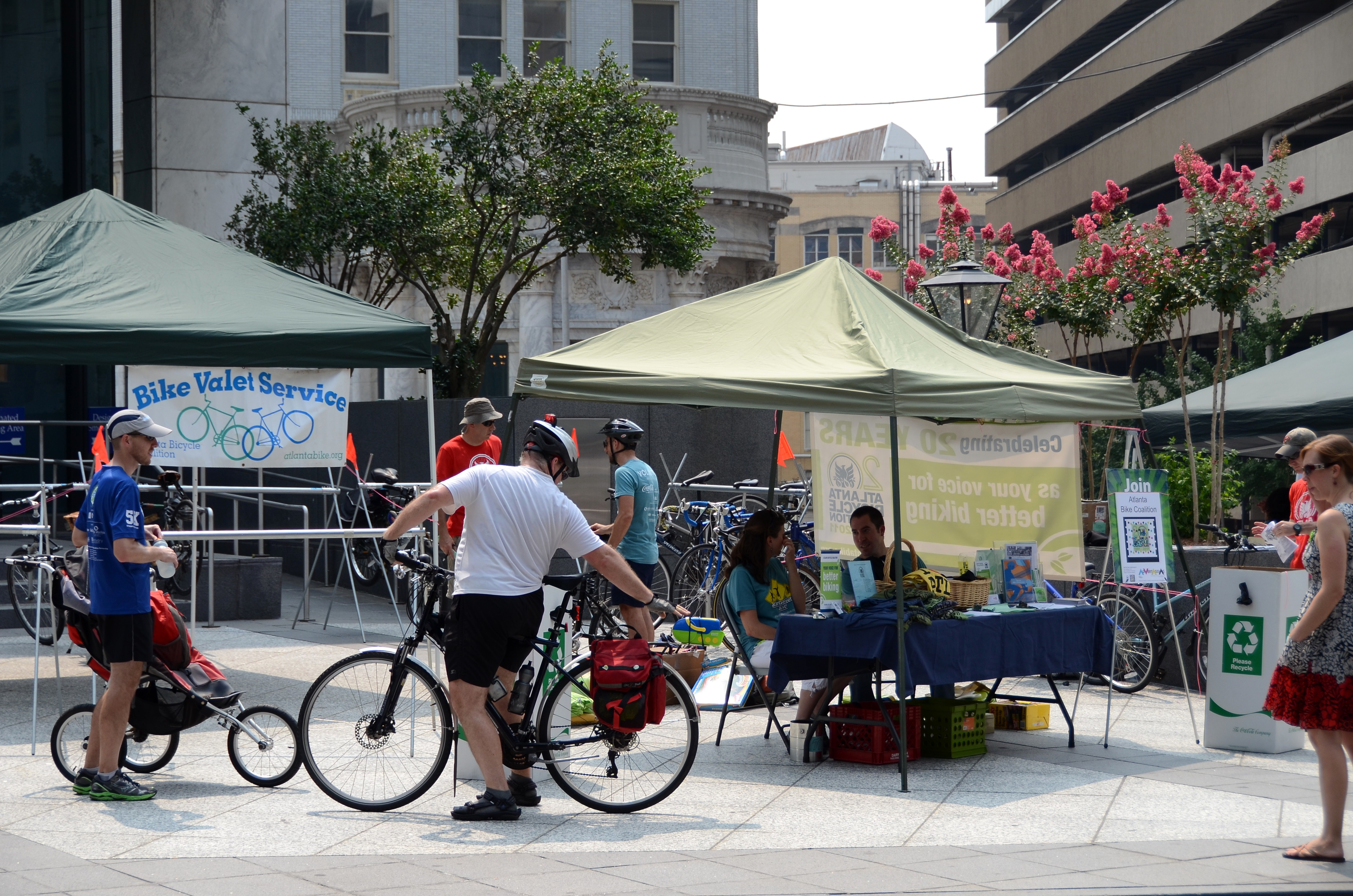
Atlanta Streets Alive in Old Fourth Ward

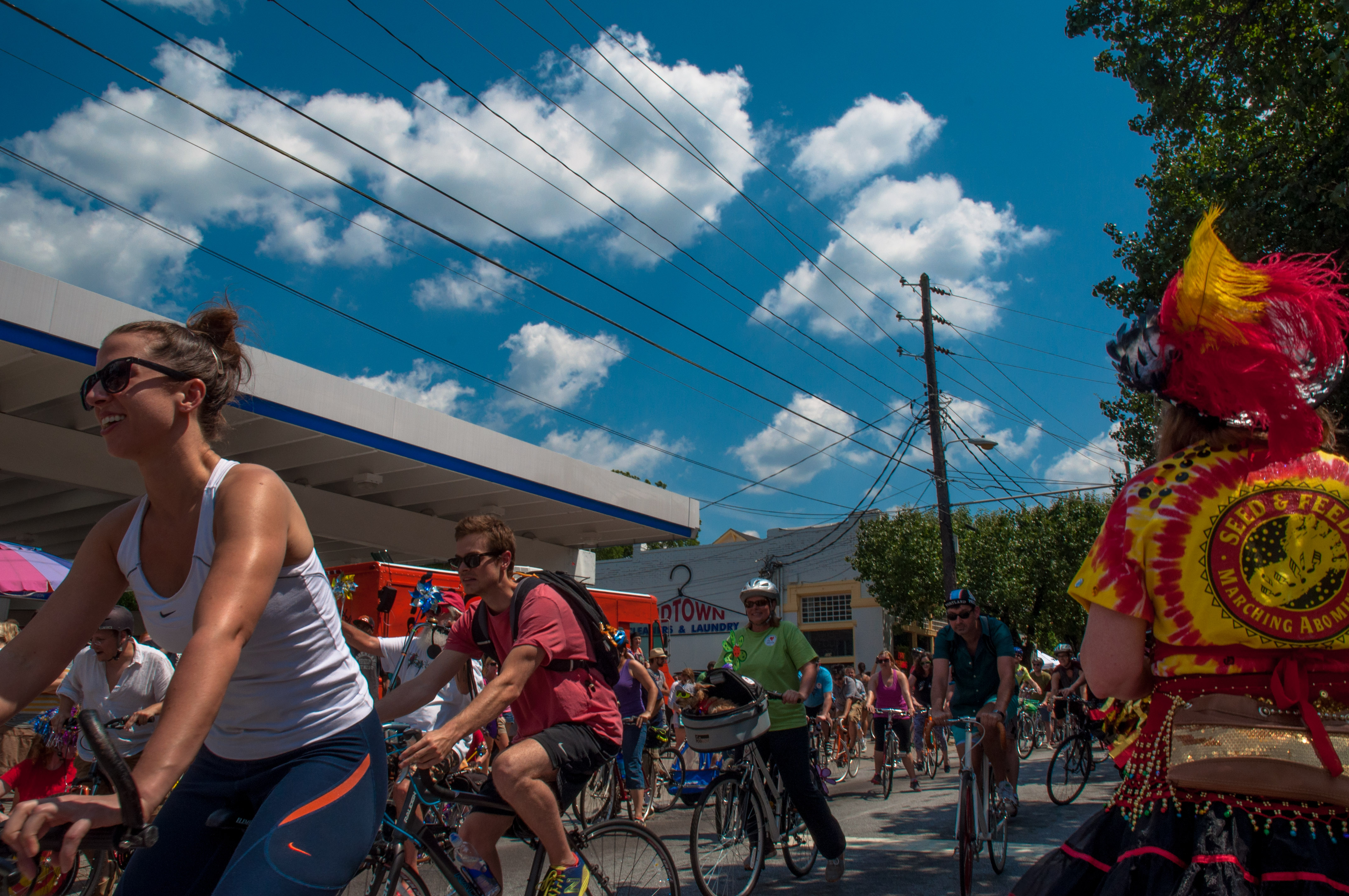
Atlanta Streets Alive in Virginia Highland

Atlanta Streets Alive is a ciclovía held throughout the year in Atlanta, Georgia, United States. Ciclovía is Spanish for a temporary closing of the street to automobiles for use by people participating in recreational activity. Organized by the Atlanta Bicycle Coalition, Atlanta Streets Alive opens streets for people in the city of Atlanta by temporarily closing them to cars to create a whole new healthy, sustainable and vibrant city street experience. People can walk, bike, roller-skate, jog, skip and roll down 3 to 5 miles of major thoroughfares that have been closed to cars throughout Atlanta three or four times a summer. Throughout the route there are activities and examples of tactical urbanism inspired to help citizens envision shared streets. In 2018, the Atlanta Bicycle Coalition connected the routes for Atlanta Streets Alive with their street campaigns to drive energy towards demanding more complete and shared streets in the city of Atlanta.

The first event kickoff was held at Woodruff Park. The event has grown from around 5,000 people in 2010, to 83,000 in October 2013, and an estimated 20,000 attended the event in October 2012. 134,000 people attended the route in June 2018. Atlanta Streets Alive is part of an international open streets movement happening in many cities throughout the U.S., Canada, and around the world. Atlanta Streets Alive strives to promote healthy lifestyles and physical activity, celebrate the unique character and community spirit of Atlanta neighborhoods, reclaim public streets for people, and build demand for streets that serve all people on foot, bike, transit and in cars.

== Event History ==
Date	Location	Length (Miles)	Attendance	Notes
May 23, 2010	Edgewood Ave	2	5,000	
October 17, 2010	Edgewood Ave	2	5,000	
June 11, 2011	Edgewood Ave, Auburn Ave	2	5,792	
June 25, 2011	Edgewood Ave, Auburn Ave	2	5,077	
May 20, 2012	North Highland Ave	2	15,000	
October 7, 2012	Virginia Ave, N Highland Ave, BeltLine	5	20,000	
May 19, 2013	Peachtree Street	2.7	15,000	
September 8, 2013	Peachtree Street	3.7	60,000	
October 7, 2013	Virginia Ave, N Highland Ave, Boulevard	5	82,000	
April 20, 2014	West End, Atlanta	2.7	16,000	
May 18, 2014	Peachtree Street	3.1	9,000	
September 28, 2014	Boulevard, North, N Highland, and Highland Ave	4.5	95,000	
April 19, 2015	Ralph David Abernathy, White Street	3	9,000	
September 27, 2015	Highland, Boulevard, North Ave	4	102,735	
October 2015	Peachtree Street	2.7	61,205	
November 8, 2015	Clarkston	1.5	500	
April 17, 2016	Ralph David Abernathy, Georgia Avenue	4	81,441	
June 12, 2016	Peachtree Street	2.7	98,077	
September 25, 2016	Highland Ave, Boulevard	3	90,416	
October 2016	Peachtree Street	2.7	106,188	
April 23, 2017	Ralph David Abernathy Blvd and Georgia Ave	4	9,000	
June 11, 2017	Marietta Street and Howell Mill Road	3.6	110,000	
September 24, 2017	Peachtree Street	3.1	134,000	
April 8, 2018	Decatur Street and DeKalb Ave	4.4	74,000	
June 10, 2018	Marietta Street and Howell Mill Road	3.6	134,000	
September 30, 2018	Peachtree Street	3.1		

== Ciclovía ==
The first open streets initiative was called Ciclovía, or “bikeway” in Spanish. Ciclovía started in Bogotá, Colombia and now draws over 1.5 million people to walk, bike, skate and enjoy more than 70 miles of streets opened to people – and closed to automobile traffic – every Sunday. Ciclovía was founded in 1976 in Bogotá, Colombia. It started small and grew in the 1990s under the mayor and the parks director, brothers Enrique and Guillermo Peñalosa. By 1996 it was recognized as the most important recreational activity in the country. The route was extended to 50 miles in 1997 and events to add appeal beyond biking were added.

On Sundays and holidays, the main streets of Bogotá, Cali, Medellín, and other major cities are blocked off for the event to become Carfree. From 7 AM to 2 PM, runners, skaters and bicyclists take over the streets. At the same time, stages are set up in city parks. Aerobics instructors, yoga teachers and musicians lead people through various performances. Bogotá's weekly ciclovías are used by approximately 2 million people (30% of citizens) on over 120 km of carfree streets. Thirty years later, the concept spread to many cities, including Tokyo, Kyiv, and Atlanta.

== See also ==
- Ciclovía
- Cycling in Atlanta
- Reclaim the Streets
- Car-free movement
