= TOSRV =

The two-day bicycle Tour of the Scioto River Valley (TOSRV) began as a father-and-son outing in 1962 before quickly growing into the nation's largest bicycle touring weekend. It is non-competitive and has been traditionally held annually on Mother's Day weekend with the exception of its early years and 2017.

About 3000 cyclists participate in the annual Mother's Day weekend tour, covering 210 miles during the weekend (105 miles Saturday and 105 miles Sunday). The tour leaves from Columbus, Ohio on Saturday morning, the riders spend the night in Portsmouth on the Ohio River, and return on Sunday to Columbus.

TOSRV is organized by Outdoor Pursuits.

Since the TOSRV route runs along the Scioto River valley, it avoids the large hills of southern Ohio. The first 50 miles south of Columbus include some slight grades, and from mile 50 to mile 65 there are a series of short, steep hills. The remaining miles to Portsmouth are relatively flat for a total of 105 miles (169 kilometers) for the day. The Tour returns to Columbus along the same route.

A separate group has started the TOSRV RESURRECTION.

== History ==
The tour was started in 1962 by Charles and Greg Siple, a father and son, having 2,672 riders in 2010. The most riders the tour ever hosted was in 1989 with 6,650 riders. A staggered start was necessary beginning in 1973 when the tour reached 2,500 cyclists. Charlie Pace was named director of the tour in 1967 and retired after the 50th anniversary ride in 2011. The tour is now considered an important part of the culture in Portsmouth, having a mural that depicts the tour.

2017 TOSRV 56
TOSRV56 May 20-21, 2017 #TheMobsRule
The Mob won. The traditional date of Mother's Day Weekend (50 of 55 years on Mother's Day) has been switched to May 20-21. One week later.
One more week to train for the baddest ride in the nation.

TOSRV56 is not your Mother's TOSRV
Opening Party: January 28 at Wild Goose Creative, 2491 Summit St, Columbus On-site registration
Come out to see 55 years of TOSRV in the many vintage pieces that will be exhibited. Drink, dance, and be TOSRV.
Public Registration: Opens January 29, 2017

== Support team ==
Sag services are provided for registered riders. Every two miles there is a support team vehicle on the side of the road in case of emergencies such as serious bicycle damage, or injury all day until 9:00 at night when the tour ends.

In front of the state building Saturday morning there is a truck to put baggage, sleeping bags and any other materials riders don't want to carry with them on the ride to Portsmouth. Food is provided at the three stops, Circleville, Chillicothe, and Waverly spaced about 25 miles apart.

== Half TOSRV ==
The half TOSRV is a smaller track in which cyclists ride from Chillicothe to Portsmouth on Saturday and return to Chillicothe on Sunday.

== Safety ==
In 2008, William Crowley, was killed on Route 23 during the tour. According to State Highway Patrol he was struck from behind by a sport-utility vehicle. The director of the tour said that this is not the designated route, but that some cyclists chose to take it to save some time. However Route 23 is not as safe as Route 104, the designated route. This was the first fatality of the tour in its almost 50-year history. After the incident TOSRV cautioned riders from riding outside the designated route. All participants are required to wear a helmet. The radio stations in central Ohio and along the tour in Circleville, Chillicothe, Waverly, and Portsmouth all broadcast messages letting drivers know to be alert and courteous of bikers during the weekend.

== Route ==
The cyclists share the road with drivers for the day. Most of the route is on two-lane country roads. The route is marked with spray paint on the road and with signs at turns.

The 2010 tour included an extra 8 miles each way due to a detour since a bridge was closed for repairs. The detour was between the Chillicothe and Waverly stops, which is the longest and hilliest part of the ride.

== Tour Directors ==
Founded by the Siple Family
19xx - 19xx
19xx - 19xx
19xx - 19xx Charlie Pace
19xx -
19xx - 2011 Charlie Pace
2012 - Frank Seebode
2013 - Rick Hoechstetter
2014 - Bill Gordon
2017 - Lisa Daris

== Assistant Tour Directors ==
19xx - 19xx
19xx - 19xx
19xx - 2011 Rick Hoechstetter
2012 -
2013 -> Rick Hoechstetter

== Bibliography ==
- The Mighty TOSRV: A 25-year Illustrated History of Tour of the Scioto River Valley - Columbus Council of American Youth Hostels; First edition (1986)
