= Center Grove Township, Dickinson County, Iowa =

Center Grove Township
- Township
- Location in Dickinson County
- Coordinates: 43°23′29″N 95°05′16″W
- Country: United States
- State: Iowa
- County: Dickinson

Area
  - Total: 36.15 sq mi (93.63 km^{2})
  - Land: 31.38 sq mi (81.28 km^{2})
  - Water: 4.77 sq mi (12.35 km^{2}) 13.19%
- Elevation: 1,398 ft (426 m)

Population (2000)
  - Total: 7,478
  - Density: 240/sq mi (92/km^{2})
- Time zone: UTC-6 (CST)
  - Summer (DST): UTC-5 (CDT)
- ZIP codes: 51331, 51351, 51355, 51360
- GNIS feature ID: 0467588

Center Grove Township is one of twelve townships in Dickinson County, Iowa, USA. As of the 2000 census, its population was 7,478.

== History ==
Center Grove Township was formed in 1866.

== Geography ==
According to the United States Census Bureau, Center Grove Township covers an area of 36.15 square miles (93.63 square kilometers); of this, 31.38 square miles (81.28 square kilometers, 86.81 percent) is land and 4.77 square miles (12.35 square kilometers, 13.19 percent) is water.

=== Cities, towns, villages ===
- Arnolds Park
- Milford (partial)
- Okoboji (southeast three-quarters)
- Spirit Lake (vast majority)
- West Okoboji (partial)

=== Adjacent townships ===
- Spirit Lake Township (north)
- Superior Township (northeast)
- Richland Township (east)
- Lloyd Township (southeast)
- Milford Township (south)
- Okoboji Township (southwest)
- Lakeville Township (west)
- Diamond Lake Township (northwest)

=== Cemeteries ===
The township contains these three cemeteries: Lake View, Lakeland Memory Gardens and Rose Hill.

=== Major highways ===
- U.S. Route 71
- Iowa Highway 9

=== Airports and landing strips ===
- Airport Okoboji
- Dickinson County Memorial Hospital Heliport
- Lake Okoboji Seaplane Base
- Spirit Lake Municipal Airport

=== Lakes ===
- Center Lake
- Lower Gar Lake
- Minnewashta Lake
- Prairie Lake
- Upper Gar Lake

=== Landmarks ===
- Pillsbury Point State Park
- Summer Circle Park

== School districts ==
- Okoboji Community School District
- Spirit Lake Community School District

== Political districts ==
- Iowa's 5th congressional district
- State House District 06
- State Senate District 03
