= Lakeville Township, Dickinson County, Iowa =

Lakeville Township
- Township
- Location in Dickinson County
- Coordinates: 43°23′18″N 95°12′46″W
- Country: United States
- State: Iowa
- County: Dickinson

Area
  - Total: 36.31 sq mi (94.05 km^{2})
  - Land: 31.44 sq mi (81.43 km^{2})
  - Water: 4.87 sq mi (12.62 km^{2}) 13.42%
- Elevation: 1,460 ft (445 m)

Population (2000)
  - Total: 1,562
  - Density: 50/sq mi (19.2/km^{2})
- Time zone: UTC-6 (CST)
  - Summer (DST): UTC-5 (CDT)
- ZIP codes: 51347, 51351, 51355, 51360
- GNIS feature ID: 0468190

Lakeville Township is one of twelve townships in Dickinson County, Iowa, United States. As of the 2000 census, its population was 1,562.

== History ==
Lakeville Township was formed in 1866.

== Geography ==
According to the United States Census Bureau, Lakeville Township covers an area of 36.31 square miles (94.05 square kilometers); of this, 31.44 square miles (81.43 square kilometers, 86.58 percent) is land and 4.87 square miles (12.62 square kilometers, 13.42 percent) is water.

=== Cities, towns, villages ===
- Okoboji (northwest quarter)
- Spirit Lake (west edge)
- Wahpeton
- West Okoboji (west three-quarters)

=== Adjacent townships ===
- Diamond Lake Township (north)
- Spirit Lake Township (northeast)
- Center Grove Township (east)
- Milford Township (southeast)
- Okoboji Township (south)
- Westport Township (southwest)
- Excelsior Township (west)
- Silver Lake Township (northwest)

=== Major highways ===
- Iowa Highway 9
- Iowa Highway 86

=== Landmarks ===
- Gull Point State Park
- Pikes Point State Park

== School districts ==
- Harris–Lake Park Community School District
- Okoboji Community School District
- Spirit Lake Community School District

== Political districts ==
- Iowa's 5th congressional district
- State House District 06
- State Senate District 03
