= Okoboji Township, Dickinson County, Iowa =

Okoboji Township
- Township
- Location in Dickinson County
- Coordinates: 43°18′03″N 95°12′27″W
- Country: United States
- State: Iowa
- County: Dickinson

Area
  - Total: 36.12 sq mi (93.54 km^{2})
  - Land: 36.09 sq mi (93.48 km^{2})
  - Water: 0.027 sq mi (0.07 km^{2}) 0.07%
- Elevation: 1,365 ft (416 m)

Population (2000)
  - Total: 2,087
  - Density: 58/sq mi (22.3/km^{2})
- Time zone: UTC-6 (CST)
  - Summer (DST): UTC-5 (CDT)
- ZIP code: 51351
- GNIS feature ID: 0468461

Okoboji Township is one of twelve townships in Dickinson County, Iowa, United States. As of the 2000 census, its population was 2,087.

== History ==
Okoboji Township was formed in 1859.

== Geography ==
According to the United States Census Bureau, Okoboji Township covers an area of 36.12 square miles (93.54 square kilometers); of this, 36.09 square miles (93.48 square kilometers, 99.94 percent) is land and 0.03 square miles (0.07 square kilometers, 0.07 percent) is water.

=== Cities, towns, villages ===
- Milford (partial)

=== Adjacent townships ===
- Lakeville Township (north)
- Center Grove Township (northeast)
- Milford Township (east)
- Meadow Township, Clay County (southeast)
- Summit Township, Clay County (south)
- Waterford Township, Clay County (southwest)
- Westport Township (west)
- Excelsior Township (northwest)

=== Cemeteries ===
The township contains these two cemeteries: Little Sioux Lutheran and Saint Joseph.

=== Major highways ===
- U.S. Route 71
- Iowa Highway 86

=== Airports and landing strips ===
- Fuller Airport

=== Rivers ===
- Little Sioux River

=== Landmarks ===
- Horseshoe Bend County Rec Area

== School districts ==
- Okoboji Community School District

== Political districts ==
- Iowa's 5th congressional district
- State House District 06
- State Senate District 03
