= Westport Township, Dickinson County, Iowa =

Westport Township
- Township
- Location in Dickinson County
- Coordinates: 43°18′01″N 95°19′41″W
- Country: United States
- State: Iowa
- County: Dickinson

Area
  - Total: 35.93 sq mi (93.05 km^{2})
  - Land: 35.92 sq mi (93.02 km^{2})
  - Water: 0.012 sq mi (0.03 km^{2}) 0.03%
- Elevation: 1,407 ft (429 m)

Population (2000)
  - Total: 143
  - Density: 3.9/sq mi (1.5/km^{2})
- Time zone: UTC-6 (CST)
  - Summer (DST): UTC-5 (CDT)
- ZIP codes: 51338, 51345, 51347, 51351
- GNIS feature ID: 0468987

Westport Township is one of twelve townships in Dickinson County, Iowa, USA. As of the 2000 census, its population was 143.

== Geography ==
According to the United States Census Bureau, Westport Township covers an area of 35.93 square miles (93.1 km^{2}); of this, 35.91 square miles (93.0 km^{2}), 99.97 percent is land and 0.01 square miles (0.026 km^{2}) and 0.03 percent is water.

=== Extinct towns ===
- Hagerty at 43.313023°N 95.329169°W
- Wallace at 43.269968°N 95.329169°W

=== Adjacent townships ===
- Excelsior Township (north)
- Lakeville Township (northeast)
- Okoboji Township (east)
- Summit Township, Clay County (southeast)
- Waterford Township, Clay County (south)
- Harrison Township, Osceola County (west)
- Allison Township, Osceola County (northwest)

=== Cemeteries ===
The township contains Westport Cemetery.

== School districts ==
- Clay Central-Everly Community School District
- Harris–Lake Park Community School District
- Hartley–Melvin–Sanborn Community School District
- Okoboji Community School District

== Political districts ==
- Iowa's 5th congressional district
- State House District 06
- State Senate District 03
