= Richland Township, Dickinson County, Iowa =

Richland Township
- Township
- Location in Dickinson County
- Coordinates: 43°23′25″N 94°58′10″W
- Country: United States
- State: Iowa
- County: Dickinson

Area
  - Total: 36.37 sq mi (94.19 km^{2})
  - Land: 36.1 sq mi (93.5 km^{2})
  - Water: 0.27 sq mi (0.69 km^{2}) 0.73%
- Elevation: 1,463 ft (446 m)

Population (2000)
  - Total: 261
  - Density: 7.3/sq mi (2.8/km^{2})
- Time zone: UTC-6 (CST)
  - Summer (DST): UTC-5 (CDT)
- ZIP codes: 51334, 51360, 51363, 51364
- GNIS feature ID: 0468603

Richland Township is one of twelve townships in Dickinson County, Iowa, USA. As of the 2000 census, its population was 261.

== Geography ==
According to the United States Census Bureau, Richland Township covers an area of 36.37 square miles (94.19 square kilometers); of this, 36.1 square miles (93.5 square kilometers, 99.27 percent) is land and 0.26 square miles (0.69 square kilometers, 0.73 percent) is water.

=== Cities, towns, villages ===
- Superior (south edge)

=== Adjacent townships ===
- Superior Township (north)
- Emmet Township, Emmet County (northeast)
- Estherville Township, Emmet County (east)
- Twelve Mile Lake Township, Emmet County (southeast)
- Lloyd Township (south)
- Milford Township (southwest)
- Center Grove Township (west)
- Spirit Lake Township (northwest)

=== Cemeteries ===
The township contains Richland Cemetery (historical).

=== Major highways ===
- U.S. Route 71
- Iowa Highway 9

=== Lakes ===
- Fourmile Lake
- Lily Lake
- Pleasant Lake

== School districts ==
- Estherville–Lincoln Central Community School District
- Spirit Lake Community School District
- Terril Community School District

== Political districts ==
- Iowa's 4th congressional district
- State House District 06
- State Senate District 03
