= Milford Township, Dickinson County, Iowa =

Milford Township
- Township
- Location in Dickinson County
- Coordinates: 43°17′52″N 95°05′25″W
- Country: United States
- State: Iowa
- County: Dickinson

Area
  - Total: 35.51 sq mi (91.98 km^{2})
  - Land: 35.46 sq mi (91.85 km^{2})
  - Water: 0.046 sq mi (0.12 km^{2}) 0.13%
- Elevation: 1,457 ft (444 m)

Population (2000)
  - Total: 869
  - Density: 25/sq mi (9.5/km^{2})
- Time zone: UTC-6 (CST)
  - Summer (DST): UTC-5 (CDT)
- ZIP codes: 51351, 51364
- GNIS feature ID: 0468380

Milford Township is one of twelve townships in Dickinson County, Iowa, USA. As of the 2000 census, its population was 869.

== Geography ==
According to the United States Census Bureau, Milford Township covers an area of 35.51 square miles (91.98 square kilometers). Of this, 35.46 square miles (91.85 square kilometers, 99.86 percent) is land, and 0.05 square miles (0.12 square kilometers, 0.13 percent) is water.

=== Cities, towns, villages ===
- Milford (east half)

=== Unincorporated towns ===
- Old Town at 43.313575°N 95.144163°W

=== Adjacent townships ===
- Center Grove Township (north)
- Richland Township (northeast)
- Lloyd Township (east)
- Lake Township, Clay County (southeast)
- Meadow Township, Clay County (south)
- Summit Township, Clay County (southwest)
- Okoboji Township (west)
- Lakeville Township (northwest)

=== Cemeteries ===
The township contains Milford Cemetery.

=== Major highways ===
- U.S. Route 71

=== Lakes ===
- Lower Gar Lake

== School districts ==
- Okoboji Community School District
- Terril Community School District

== Political districts ==
- Iowa's 5th congressional district
- State House District 06
- State Senate District 03
