= Iowa Highway 86 =

State highway in Iowa, United States

Iowa Highway 86
- Iowa 86 highlighted in red

Route information
- Maintained by Iowa DOT
- Length: 12.740 mi (20.503 km)

Major junctions
- South end: US 71 in Milford
- Iowa 9 west of Spirit Lake
- North end: MN 86 northwest of Spirit Lake

Location
- Country: United States
- State: Iowa
- Counties: Dickinson

Highway system
- Iowa Primary Highway System; Interstate; US; State; Secondary; Scenic
| ← Iowa 85 | → Iowa 92 |

Iowa Highway 86 (Iowa 86) is a state highway that runs from north to south in northwest Iowa. It begins at U.S. Highway 71 (US 71) in northern Milford and ends at the Minnesota border northwest of Spirit Lake, where it continues onward as Minnesota State Highway 86.

== Route description ==
Iowa Highway 86 begins at an intersection with US 71 north of Milford. It heads westward from this point before turning northward, passing through Wahpeton. It continues northward, passing along West Okoboji Lake along the way. West of Spirit Lake, it intersects with IA 9. Further north, it reaches the Minnesota state border, where the highway terminates. It continues into Minnesota as MN 86.

== History ==
Prior to its current alignment, the highway was originally designated as Iowa Highway 32. In February 1981, Iowa 32 was decommissioned from US 71 north of Milford to Iowa 9 west of Spirit Lake. The road was also extended from Iowa 9 northward to the Minnesota border. The old alignment of Iowa 32 was renumbered as the present day Iowa 86. In 2013, Iowa 86 was reconstructed north of Iowa 9 to the Minnesota state line. The project consisted of reducing the severity of the two sharp curves located at the state line, right-of-way widening, and "flattening" the road by cutting down the high points and filling in the low points.

== Major intersections ==
The entire route is in Dickinson County.

| Location | mi | km | Destinations | Notes |
|---|---|---|---|---|
| West Okoboji | 0.000 | 0.000 | US 71 – Milford, Arnolds Park | |
| Triboji Beach | 7.682 | 12.363 | Iowa 9 – Spirit Lake, Lake Park | |
| Diamond Lake Township | 12.740 | 20.503 | MN 86 north – Lakefield | Continuation into Minnesota |
1.000 mi = 1.609 km; 1.000 km = 0.621 mi
