= Superior Township, Dickinson County, Iowa =

Superior Township
- Township
- Location in Dickinson County
- Coordinates: 43°27′52″N 94°57′51″W
- Country: United States
- State: Iowa
- County: Dickinson

Area
  - Total: 28.6 sq mi (74.2 km^{2})
  - Land: 28.14 sq mi (72.87 km^{2})
  - Water: 0.52 sq mi (1.34 km^{2}) 1.81%
- Elevation: 1,398 ft (426 m)

Population (2000)
  - Total: 300
  - Density: 11/sq mi (4.1/km^{2})
- Time zone: UTC-6 (CST)
  - Summer (DST): UTC-5 (CDT)
- ZIP codes: 51334, 51360, 51363
- GNIS feature ID: 0468770

Superior Township is one of twelve townships in Dickinson County, Iowa, USA. As of the 2000 census, its population was 300.

== History ==
Superior Township was formed in 1872.

== Geography ==
According to the United States Census Bureau, Superior Township covers an area of 28.65 square miles (74.2 square kilometers); of this, 28.13 square miles (72.87 square kilometers, 98.21 percent) is land and 0.52 square miles (1.34 square kilometers, 1.81 percent) is water.

=== Cities, towns, villages ===
- Superior (vast majority)

=== Adjacent townships ===
- Emmet Township, Emmet County (east)
- Estherville Township, Emmet County (southeast)
- Richland Township (south)
- Center Grove Township (southwest)
- Spirit Lake Township (west)

=== Cemeteries ===
The township contains Superior Township Cemetery.

=== Major highways ===
- U.S. Route 71

=== Lakes ===
- Swan Lake

== School districts ==
- Estherville–Lincoln Central Community School District
- Spirit Lake Community School District

== Political districts ==
- Iowa's 5th congressional district
- State House District 06
- State Senate District 03
