= Excelsior Township, Dickinson County, Iowa =

Excelsior Township
- Township
- Location in Dickinson County
- Coordinates: 43°23′06″N 95°19′22″W
- Country: United States
- State: Iowa
- County: Dickinson

Area
  - Total: 36.36 sq mi (94.16 km^{2})
  - Land: 36.24 sq mi (93.86 km^{2})
  - Water: 0.12 sq mi (0.3 km^{2}) 0.32%
- Elevation: 1,483 ft (452 m)

Population (2000)
  - Total: 186
  - Density: 5.2/sq mi (2/km^{2})
- Time zone: UTC-6 (CST)
  - Summer (DST): UTC-5 (CDT)
- ZIP codes: 51345, 51347, 51351
- GNIS feature ID: 0467803

Excelsior Township is one of twelve townships in Dickinson County, Iowa, US. As of the 2000 census, its population was 186.

== Geography ==
According to the United States Census Bureau, Excelsior Township covers an area of 36.36 square miles (94.16 square kilometers); of this, 36.24 square miles (93.86 square kilometers, 99.68 percent) is land and 0.12 square miles (0.3 square kilometers, 0.32 percent) is water.

=== Adjacent townships ===
- Silver Lake Township (north)
- Diamond Lake Township (northeast)
- Lakeville Township (east)
- Okoboji Township (southeast)
- Westport Township (south)
- Harrison Township, Osceola County (southwest)
- Allison Township, Osceola County (west)
- Fairview Township, Osceola County (northwest)

=== Cemeteries ===
The township contains Excelsior Township Cemetery.

=== Major highways ===
- Iowa Highway 9

=== Lakes ===
- Stony Lake

== School districts ==
- Harris–Lake Park Community School District
- Okoboji Community School District

== Political districts ==
- Iowa's 5th congressional district
- State House District 06
- State Senate District 03
