= Wahpeton =

Wahpeton may refer to:

== Places ==
- Wahpeton, Iowa, U.S.
- Wahpeton, North Dakota, U.S.
  - Wahpeton micropolitan area

== Other uses ==
- List of ships named Wahpeton
- Dakota tribe, shortened form of Waȟpéthuŋwaŋ ‘Leaf Dwellers’

== See also ==
- Sisseton Wahpeton Oyate, a federally recognized tribe in South Dakota, U.S.
- Wahpeton Dakota Nation, in Saskatchewan, Canada
