= Diamond Lake Township, Dickinson County, Iowa =

Diamond Lake Township
- Township
- Location in Dickinson County
- Coordinates: 43°28′11″N 95°12′22″W
- Country: United States
- State: Iowa
- County: Dickinson

Area
  - Total: 28.80 sq mi (74.58 km^{2})
  - Land: 28.26 sq mi (73.19 km^{2})
  - Water: 0.53 sq mi (1.38 km^{2}) 1.85%
- Elevation: 1,398 ft (426 m)

Population (2000)
  - Total: 296
  - Density: 10/sq mi (4/km^{2})
- Time zone: UTC-6 (CST)
  - Summer (DST): UTC-5 (CDT)
- ZIP codes: 51347, 51360
- GNIS feature ID: 0467715

Diamond Lake Township is one of twelve townships in Dickinson County, Iowa, United States. As of the 2000 census, its population was 296.

== Geography ==
According to the United States Census Bureau, Diamond Lake Township covers an area of 28.79 square miles (74.58 square kilometers); of this, 28.26 square miles (73.19 square kilometers, 98.14 percent) is land and 0.53 square miles (1.38 square kilometers, 1.85 percent) is water.

=== Unincorporated towns ===
- Montgomery at 43.440797°N 95.202775°W

(This list is based on USGS data and may include former settlements.)

=== Adjacent townships ===
- Spirit Lake Township (east)
- Center Grove Township (southeast)
- Lakeville Township (south)
- Excelsior Township (southwest)
- Silver Lake Township (west)

=== Major highways ===
- Iowa Highway 86

=== Lakes ===
- Diamond Lake
- Welsh Lake

== School districts ==
- Harris–Lake Park Community School District
- Spirit Lake Community School District

== Political districts ==
- Iowa's 5th congressional district
- State House District 06
- State Senate District 03
