= Spirit Lake Township, Dickinson County, Iowa =

Spirit Lake Township
- Township
- Location in Dickinson County
- Coordinates: 43°27′52″N 95°05′03″W
- Country: United States
- State: Iowa
- County: Dickinson

Area
  - Total: 28.90 sq mi (74.86 km^{2})
  - Land: 19.01 sq mi (49.23 km^{2})
  - Water: 9.90 sq mi (25.63 km^{2}) 34.24%
- Elevation: 1,410 ft (430 m)

Population (2000)
  - Total: 1,467
  - Density: 77/sq mi (29.8/km^{2})
- Time zone: UTC-6 (CST)
  - Summer (DST): UTC-5 (CDT)
- ZIP codes: 51360
- GNIS feature ID: 0468734

Spirit Lake Township is one of twelve townships in Dickinson County, Iowa, USA. As of the 2000 census, its population was 1,467.

== History ==
Spirit Lake Township was formed in 1859.

== Geography ==
According to the United States Census Bureau, Spirit Lake Township covers an area of 28.9 square miles (74.86 square kilometers); of this, 19.01 square miles (49.23 square kilometers, 65.76 percent) is land and 9.9 square miles (25.63 square kilometers, 34.24 percent) is water.

=== Cities, towns, villages ===
- Orleans
- Spirit Lake (partial)

=== Adjacent townships ===
- Superior Township (east)
- Richland Township (southeast)
- Center Grove Township (south)
- Lakeville Township (southwest)
- Diamond Lake Township (west)

=== Cemeteries ===
The township contains Saint Margaret Cemetery.

=== Lakes ===
- Center Lake
- East Okoboji Lake
- Hottes Lake
- Little Spirit Lake
- Marble Lake
- Spirit Lake
- Sunken Lake

=== Landmarks ===
- Mini Wakan State Park

== School districts ==
- Spirit Lake Community School District

== Political districts ==
- Iowa's 5th congressional district
- State House District 06
- State Senate District 03
