= Silver Lake Township, Dickinson County, Iowa =

Silver Lake Township
- Township
- Location in Dickinson County
- Coordinates: 43°27′34″N 95°19′47″W
- Country: United States
- State: Iowa
- County: Dickinson

Area
  - Total: 28.71 sq mi (74.37 km^{2})
  - Land: 27.1 sq mi (70.3 km^{2})
  - Water: 1.57 sq mi (4.07 km^{2}) 5.47%
- Elevation: 1,503 ft (458 m)

Population (2000)
  - Total: 1,159
  - Density: 43/sq mi (16.5/km^{2})
- Time zone: UTC-6 (CST)
  - Summer (DST): UTC-5 (CDT)
- ZIP code: 51347
- GNIS feature ID: 0468712

Silver Lake Township is one of twelve townships in Dickinson County, Iowa, USA. As of the 2000 census, its population was 1,159.

== Geography ==
According to the United States Census Bureau, Silver Lake Township covers an area of 28.72 square miles (74.37 square kilometers); of this, 27.14 square miles (70.3 square kilometers, 94.53 percent) is land and 1.57 square miles (4.07 square kilometers, 5.47 percent) is water.

=== Cities, towns, villages ===
- Lake Park

=== Adjacent townships ===
- Diamond Lake Township (east)
- Lakeville Township (southeast)
- Excelsior Township (south)
- Allison Township, Osceola County (southwest)
- Fairview Township, Osceola County (west)

=== Cemeteries ===
The township contains Silver Lake Cemetery.

=== Lakes ===
- Silver Lake

=== Landmarks ===
- City Park
- Trappers Bay State Park

== School districts ==
- Harris–Lake Park Community School District

== Political districts ==
- Iowa's 5th congressional district
- State House District 06
- State Senate District 03
