= Excelsior Township =

Excelsior Township may refer to the following townships in the United States:

- Excelsior Township, Dickinson County, Iowa
- Excelsior Township, Michigan, in Kalkaska County
