= Terril, Iowa =

- City
- Location of Terril, Iowa
- Coordinates: 43°18′21″N 94°58′08″W
- Country: USA
- State: Iowa
- County: Dickinson

Area
  - Total: 0.54 sq mi (1.41 km^{2})
  - Land: 0.54 sq mi (1.41 km^{2})
  - Water: 0 sq mi (0.00 km^{2})
- Elevation: 1,427 ft (435 m)

Population (2020)
  - Total: 334
  - Density: 615.6/sq mi (237.67/km^{2})
- Time zone: UTC-6 (Central (CST))
  - Summer (DST): UTC-5 (CDT)
- ZIP code: 51364
- Area code: 712
- FIPS code: 19-77520
- GNIS feature ID: 2396043
- Website: www.terrilcityhub.com/c/

Terril is a city in Dickinson County, Iowa, United States. The population was 334 at the time of the 2020 census.

== History ==
Terril (formerly spelled Terrill) was platted in 1895.

== Geography ==
According to the United States Census Bureau, the city has a total area of 0.55 square miles (1.42 km^{2}), all land.

== Demographics ==
Historical populations
Year	Pop.	±%
1900	217	—
1910	253	+16.6%
1920	440	+73.9%
1930	416	−5.5%
1940	452	+8.7%
1950	425	−6.0%
1960	382	−10.1%
1970	397	+3.9%
1980	420	+5.8%
1990	383	−8.8%
2000	404	+5.5%
2010	367	−9.2%
2020	334	−9.0%
Source:"U.S. Census website". United States Census Bureau. and Iowa Data Center; Source: U.S. Decennial Census

=== 2020 census ===
As of the census of 2020, there were 334 people, 149 households, and 83 families residing in the city. The population density was 615.6 inhabitants per square mile (237.7/km^{2}). There were 180 housing units at an average density of 331.7 per square mile (128.1/km^{2}). The racial makeup of the city was 94.0% White, 0.9% Black or African American, 0.3% Native American, 0.0% Asian, 0.0% Pacific Islander, 0.3% from other races and 4.5% from two or more races. Hispanic or Latino persons of any race comprised 2.1% of the population.

Of the 149 households, 21.5% of which had children under the age of 18 living with them, 42.3% were married couples living together, 12.1% were cohabitating couples, 20.1% had a female householder with no spouse or partner present and 25.5% had a male householder with no spouse or partner present. 44.3% of all households were non-families. 33.6% of all households were made up of individuals, 12.8% had someone living alone who was 65 years old or older.

The median age in the city was 43.0 years. 21.3% of the residents were under the age of 20; 3.6% were between the ages of 20 and 24; 27.2% were from 25 and 44; 27.2% were from 45 and 64; and 20.7% were 65 years of age or older. The gender makeup of the city was 53.9% male and 46.1% female.

=== 2010 census ===
As of the census of 2010, there were 367 people, 164 households, and 106 families living in the city. The population density was 667.3 inhabitants per square mile (257.6/km^{2}). There were 178 housing units at an average density of 323.6 per square mile (124.9/km^{2}). The racial makeup of the city was 94.8% White, 0.5% African American, 1.1% Asian, 1.6% from other races, and 1.9% from two or more races. Hispanic or Latino of any race were 2.2% of the population.

There were 164 households, of which 26.2% had children under the age of 18 living with them, 48.8% were married couples living together, 7.9% had a female householder with no husband present, 7.9% had a male householder with no wife present, and 35.4% were non-families. 30.5% of all households were made up of individuals, and 9.7% had someone living alone who was 65 years of age or older. The average household size was 2.24 and the average family size was 2.74.

The median age in the city was 39.4 years. 21.8% of residents were under the age of 18; 9.2% were between the ages of 18 and 24; 25.6% were from 25 to 44; 28.1% were from 45 to 64; and 15.3% were 65 years of age or older. The gender makeup of the city was 52.9% male and 47.1% female.

=== 2000 census ===
As of the census of 2000, there were 404 people, 171 households, and 108 families living in the city. The population density was 740.0 inhabitants per square mile (285.7/km^{2}). There were 186 housing units at an average density of 340.7 per square mile (131.5/km^{2}). The racial makeup of the city was 99.01% White, 0.25% African American, 0.50% Asian, and 0.25% from two or more races. Hispanic or Latino of any race were 0.25% of the population.

There were 171 households, out of which 29.8% had children under the age of 18 living with them, 53.8% were married couples living together, 5.8% had a female householder with no husband present, and 36.8% were non-families. 32.7% of all households were made up of individuals, and 15.8% had someone living alone who was 65 years of age or older. The average household size was 2.36 and the average family size was 2.99.

In the city, the population was spread out, with 25.7% under the age of 18, 9.9% from 18 to 24, 27.2% from 25 to 44, 18.8% from 45 to 64, and 18.3% who were 65 years of age or older. The median age was 35 years. For every 100 females, there were 104.0 males. For every 100 females age 18 and over, there were 101.3 males.

The median income for a household in the city was $34,583, and the median income for a family was $39,250. Males had a median income of $25,592 versus $19,306 for females. The per capita income for the city was $16,283. About 8.8% of families and 13.8% of the population were below the poverty line, including 32.5% of those under age 18 and 8.3% of those age 65 or over.

== Education ==
Terril is served by the Graettinger–Terril Community School District, formed by the 2010 merger of the Terril and Graettinger districts.

== Notable people ==
- Darleane C. Hoffman (1926–2025), nuclear chemist
