= Graettinger, Iowa =

- City
- Location of Graettinger, Iowa
- Coordinates: 43°14′14″N 94°44′57″W
- Country: USA
- State: Iowa
- County: Palo Alto

Area
  - Total: 0.75 sq mi (1.95 km^{2})
  - Land: 0.75 sq mi (1.95 km^{2})
  - Water: 0 sq mi (0.00 km^{2})
- Elevation: 1,247 ft (380 m)

Population (2020)
  - Total: 832
  - Density: 1,103/sq mi (425.9/km^{2})
- Time zone: UTC-6 (Central (CST))
  - Summer (DST): UTC-5 (CDT)
- ZIP code: 51342
- Area code: 712
- FIPS code: 19-31800
- GNIS feature ID: 2394941
- Website: www.graettinger.net

Graettinger is a city in Palo Alto County, Iowa, United States. The population was 832 at the time of the 2020 census.

== History ==
Graettinger got its start in the 1880s, following construction of the Burlington, Cedar Rapids and Northern Railway through that territory. The land was originally owned by Dr. Alois Graettinger, a German physician who had immigrated to Milwaukee, Wisconsin. He gave the land to the railway under the condition that the town were to be named after him. Members of the Graettinger family still live in the town. They are descendants of Dr. Graettinger's brother, Blasius, who was a stone cutter by trade but moved to Iowa to farm.

Graettinger is the location of the oldest Labor Day celebration in the state of Iowa. Each year, the town celebrates with a parade, carnival, street dance, variety show, queen coronation, raffle drawing and various other events.

=== About Dr. Alois Graettinger ===
Dr. Alois Graettinger was a German-American physician born in Passau, Bavaria, on January 10, 1834. He attended the local school and gymnasium of Passau. At the age of 18, Graettinger entered the LMU Munich, completing the “biennium practicum”, after which he was assistant in the obstetrical clinic of the university for one year before leaving for Milwaukee in 1857. In 1865, he took the degree of M.D. at the Chicago Medical College and in 1878 that of LMU Munich. In 1894, Dr. Graettinger was chosen as the president of the Society of German Physicians in Milwaukee. On account of ill health he left for California in 1898, giving up practice and tilling the soil until his death due to arteriosclerosis on October 23, 1907.

== Geography ==
Graettinger is located near the Des Moines River.

According to the United States Census Bureau, the city has a total area of 0.77 square miles (1.99 km^{2}), all land.

== Demographics ==
Historical populations
Year	Pop.	±%
1900	388	—
1910	556	+43.3%
1920	779	+40.1%
1930	777	−0.3%
1940	928	+19.4%
1950	1,016	+9.5%
1960	879	−13.5%
1970	907	+3.2%
1980	923	+1.8%
1990	813	−11.9%
2000	900	+10.7%
2010	844	−6.2%
2020	832	−1.4%
Source:"U.S. Census website". United States Census Bureau. and Iowa Data Center; Source: U.S. Decennial Census

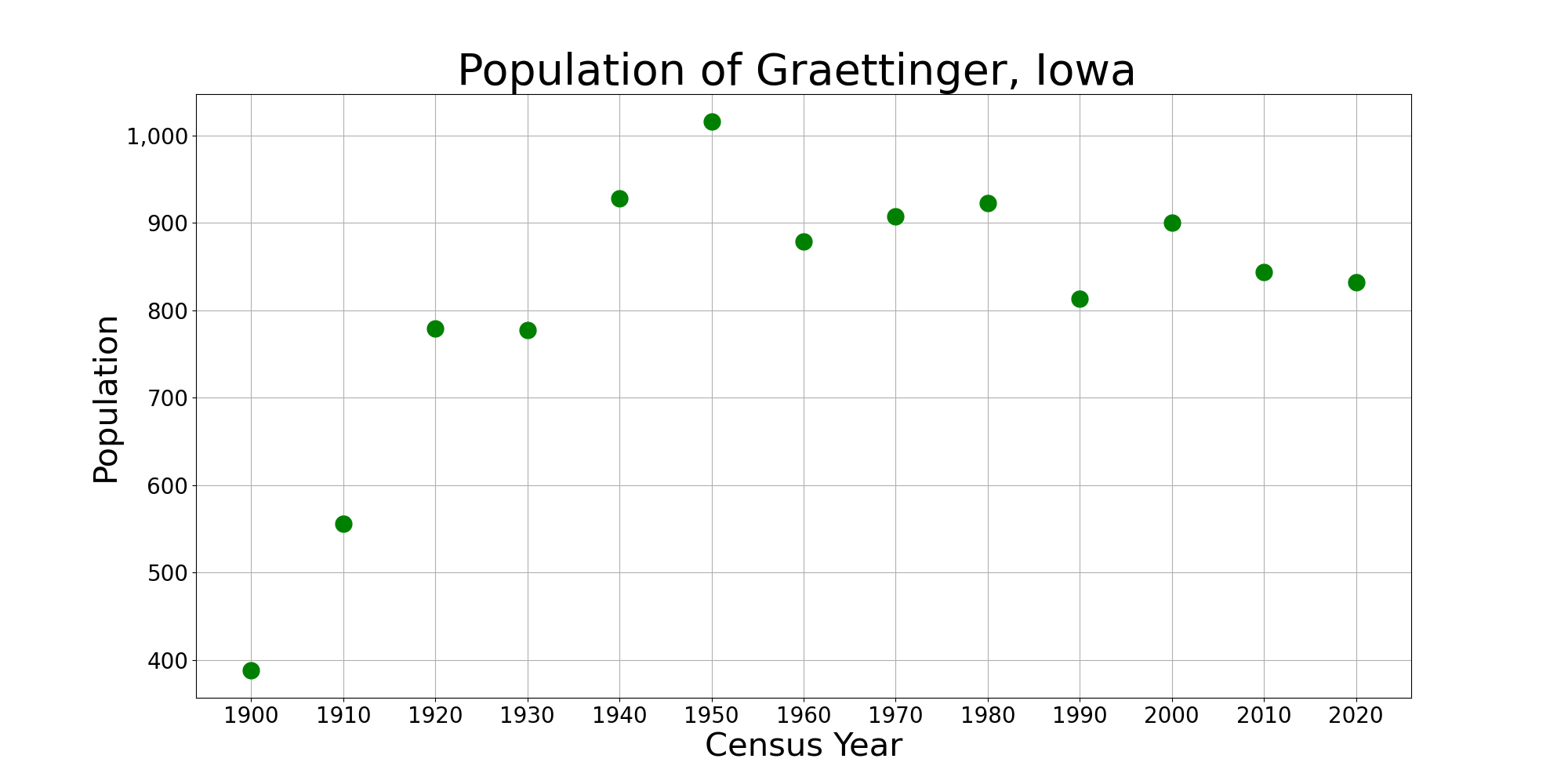
The population of Graettinger, Iowa from US census data

=== 2020 census ===
As of the census of 2020, there were 832 people, 358 households, and 204 families residing in the city. The population density was 1,103.1 inhabitants per square mile (425.9/km^{2}). There were 415 housing units at an average density of 550.2 per square mile (212.4/km^{2}). The racial makeup of the city was 93.9% White, 0.1% Black or African American, 0.6% Native American, 0.0% Asian, 0.1% Pacific Islander, 0.7% from other races and 4.6% from two or more races. Hispanic or Latino persons of any race comprised 3.6% of the population.

Of the 358 households, 29.9% of which had children under the age of 18 living with them, 42.5% were married couples living together, 10.3% were cohabitating couples, 24.9% had a female householder with no spouse or partner present and 22.3% had a male householder with no spouse or partner present. 43.0% of all households were non-families. 36.9% of all households were made up of individuals, 15.4% had someone living alone who was 65 years old or older.

The median age in the city was 37.2 years. 29.3% of the residents were under the age of 20; 3.8% were between the ages of 20 and 24; 26.1% were from 25 and 44; 24.6% were from 45 and 64; and 16.1% were 65 years of age or older. The gender makeup of the city was 50.5% male and 49.5% female.

=== 2010 census ===
As of the census of 2010, there were 844 people, 382 households, and 227 families living in the city. The population density was 1,096.1 inhabitants per square mile (423.2/km^{2}). There were 440 housing units at an average density of 571.4 per square mile (220.6/km^{2}). The racial makeup of the city was 98.5% White, 0.4% African American, 0.1% Native American, 0.5% from other races, and 0.6% from two or more races. Hispanic or Latino of any race were 0.8% of the population.

There were 382 households, of which 28.3% had children under the age of 18 living with them, 44.8% were married couples living together, 8.6% had a female householder with no husband present, 6.0% had a male householder with no wife present, and 40.6% were non-families. 35.1% of all households were made up of individuals, and 17.9% had someone living alone who was 65 years of age or older. The average household size was 2.21 and the average family size was 2.85.

The median age in the city was 37 years. 24.5% of residents were under the age of 18; 8.8% were between the ages of 18 and 24; 23.5% were from 25 to 44; 24.1% were from 45 to 64; and 19.2% were 65 years of age or older. The gender makeup of the city was 48.6% male and 51.4% female.

=== 2000 census ===
As of the census of 2000, there were 900 people, 396 households, and 241 families living in the city. The population density was 1,174.8 inhabitants per square mile (453.6/km^{2}). There were 430 housing units at an average density of 561.3 per square mile (216.7/km^{2}). The racial makeup of the city was 98.78% White, 0.11% African American, 0.56% Native American, and 0.56% from two or more races. Hispanic or Latino of any race were 0.89% of the population.

There were 396 households, out of which 27.0% had children under the age of 18 living with them, 51.3% were married couples living together, 7.6% had a female householder with no husband present, and 39.1% were non-families. 35.9% of all households were made up of individuals, and 17.9% had someone living alone who was 65 years of age or older. The average household size was 2.25 and the average family size was 2.90.

In the city, the population was spread out, with 26.2% under the age of 18, 7.4% from 18 to 24, 25.2% from 25 to 44, 21.2% from 45 to 64, and 19.9% who were 65 years of age or older. The median age was 38 years. For every 100 females, there were 87.9 males. For every 100 females age 18 and over, there were 83.4 males.

The median income for a household in the city was $28,988, and the median income for a family was $36,591. Males had a median income of $26,726 versus $17,721 for females. The per capita income for the city was $15,520. About 3.9% of families and 9.4% of the population were below the poverty line, including 5.4% of those under age 18 and 14.1% of those age 65 or over.

== Education ==
Graettinger is served by the Graettinger–Terril Community School District, formed by the 2010 merger of the Graettinger and Terril Community School Districts.
