= Graettinger–Terril Community School District =

Public school district in Graettinger, Iowa, United States

Coordinates: 43.236389°N 94.755097°W

Location
- Graettinger, Iowa Clay, Dickinson, Emmet, and Palo Alto counties United States
- Coordinates: 43.236389, -94.755097

District information
- Type: Local school district
- Grades: K–12
- Established: 2010
- Superintendent: Marshall Lewis
- Schools: 3
- Budget: $7,251,000 (2020-21)
- NCES District ID: 1912810

Students and staff
- Students: 354 (2022-23)
- Teachers: 32.23 FTE
- Staff: 41.81 FTE
- Student–teacher ratio: 10.98
- Athletic conference: Twin Lakes
- District mascot: Titans
- Colors: Purple, Black and Silver

Other information
- Website: www.gtschools.k12.ia.us

Graettinger–Terril Community School District (G-T) is a rural public school district in Iowa, with campuses in Graettinger and Terril. The district lies within four counties: Clay, Dickinson, Emmet, and Palo Alto.

In 2013, the district had 329 students.

== History ==
It was established on July 1, 2010, as a consolidation of the Graettinger Community School District and the Terril Community School District.

In 2011, the district and the Ruthven-Ayrshire Community School District agreed to do athletic team sharing. In 2013 the district and the Ruthven-Ayrshire agreed to a partial-day sharing arrangement in that high school students may spend portions of their school days at each campus for certain courses. They began discussing the idea in October 2012. They had discussed the possibility of whole grade-sharing, but Ruthven-Ayrshire canceled those talks in January 2013, stating that it wanted to have its own students in its own high school.

On September 12, 2017, there was a $9.61 bond election for improvements in the Graettinger and Terril buildings, with a security entrance for the latter and classroom improvements for the former.

An election for a $9.7 million bond, held on April 3, 2018, and requiring 60% or more of the voters to approve, was for a regulation gymnasium and industrial arts and science classrooms at the high school facility. It was approved on a 658-410 (61.6%) basis, with Graettinger voters voting 404–108 (78.9%) in favor, Terril voters opposing it by 195–111 (36.3% in favor), and absentee ballots favoring it on a 143–101 (57.2%) basis.

== Schools ==
The district operates three schools:

- Graettinger–Terril Elementary School, Terril
- Graettinger–Terril Middle School, Graettinger
- Graettinger–Terril High School, Graettinger

=== Graettinger–Terril High School ===
==== Athletics ====
The Titans compete in the Twin Lakes Conference in the following sports as G-T/R-A:

- Cross country
- Volleyball
- Football
- Basketball
- Wrestling
- Track and field
- Golf
- Baseball
- Softball

== See also ==
- List of school districts in Iowa
- List of high schools in Iowa
