= Montgomery, Iowa =

- Unincorporated community
- Location within Iowa
- Coordinates: 43°26′27″N 095°12′10″W
- Country: United States
- State: Iowa
- County: Dickinson County
- Township: Diamond Lake Township
- Elevation: 1,457 ft (444 m)
- Time zone: UTC-6 (Central (CST))
  - Summer (DST): UTC-5 (CDT)
- ZIP code: 51360
- GNIS feature ID: 459192

Montgomery is an unincorporated community in Diamond Lake Township, Dickinson County, Iowa, United States.

== History ==
Montgomery had its start by the building of the Rock Island railroad through that territory. The railroad has since been removed but the elevator that was there over it still remains. There used to be a schoolhouse which has since been moved and converted into a house. In addition to the schoolhouse there was a Postal Service building which was converted into a garage and is privately owned.

Montgomery's population was 73 in 1902, and 105 in 1925. The population was estimated at 200 in 1940.

== Geography ==
Montgomery is located at 43°26′27″N 095°12′10″W at an elevation of 1457 feet.
