= Okoboji High School =

Public secondary school in Milford, Iowa, United States

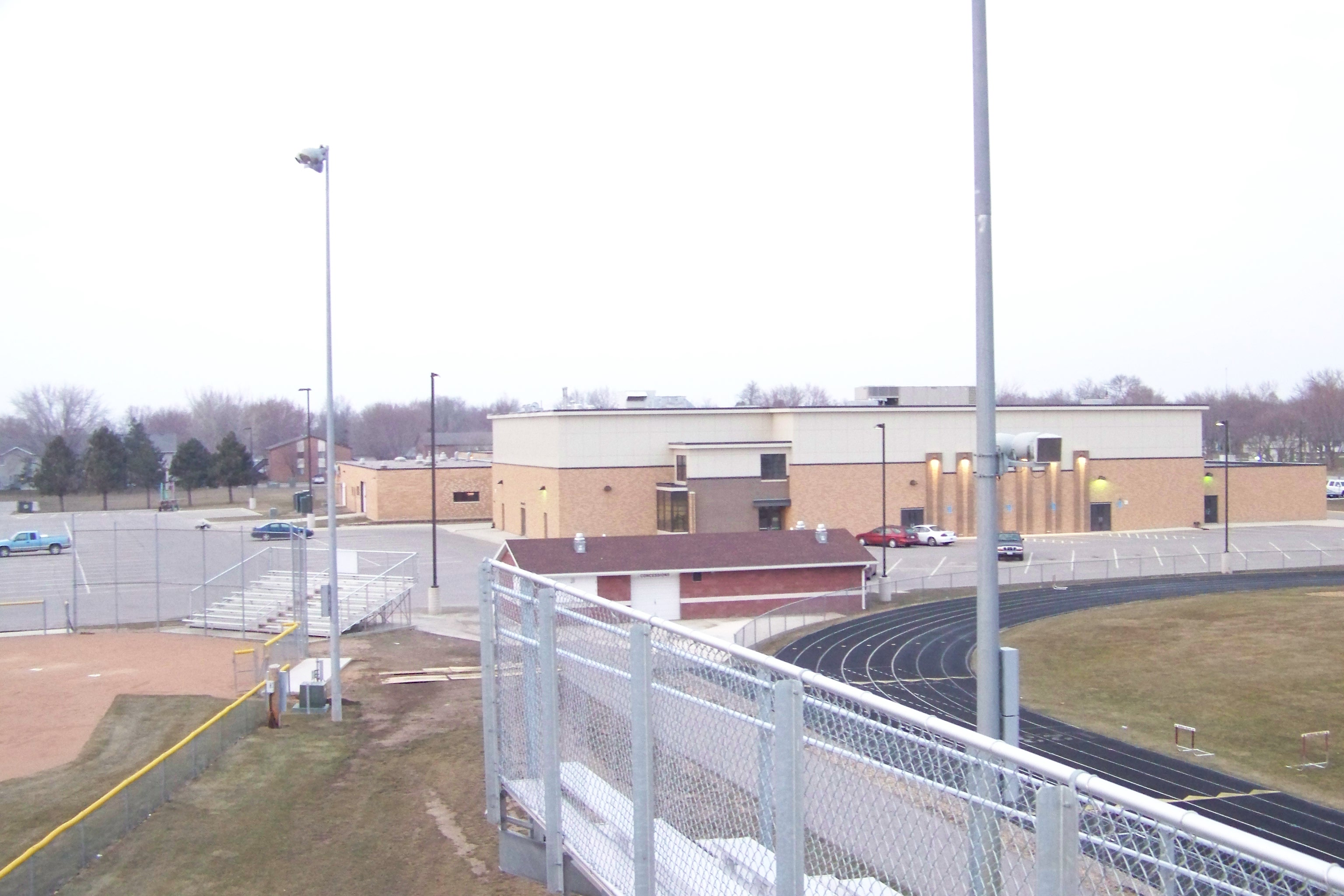

Location
- 901 H. Ave; Milford, Iowa 51351; United States
- 43.3238532°N 95.1594408°W

Information
- Motto: Pioneering pathways for all students.
- School district: Okoboji Community School District
- CEEB code: 162905
- Principal: Brian Downing
- Teaching staff: 23.30 (FTE)
- Enrollment: 373 (2023-2024)
- Student to teacher ratio: 16.01
- Campus type: Town
- Colors: Maroon and White
- Slogan: Pioneering pathways
- Fight song: Okoboji Fight Song
- Athletics conference: Siouxland
- Mascot: Pioneer Pete
- Nickname: Okoboji
- Team name: Pioneers
- Rival: Spirit Lake Indians
- Newspaper: Boji Blaze
- Website: www.okobojischools.org/o/ohs

Okoboji High School is a rural public high school in Milford, Iowa. It is the primary senior high school in the Okoboji Community School District. Their mascot is Pioneer Pete.

The school district serves Milford, Arnolds Park, most of Fostoria, most of Okoboji, Wahpeton, and West Okoboji.

== Curriculum ==
Courses for dual high school and college credit are available for free to students through Iowa Lakes Community College.

== Extracurricular activities ==
=== Athletics ===
Okoboji High School is a member of the Siouxland Conference. The Pioneers field teams in baseball, basketball, cross country, football, golf, softball, track, volleyball, and wrestling. It shares sports teams in soccer, tennis, and swimming.

State Championships

- 1973 Boys Class C Cross Country (as Milford)
- 2003 Boys Class 2A Track and Field

=== Clubs and performance groups ===
Okoboji's performing arts have several award-winning programs. Most notably is the jazz band, which has qualified for state the last 28 years. Winning the state championship in 1999, 2000, 2010, 2011, 2018, and 2019.

Okoboji's debate program won the Sweepstakes trophy in 2007 and has had multiple state champions and national qualifiers.

Okoboji's speech program has had numerous all-state selections and won the all-state banner for improvisational acting in 1995.

Other activities and clubs include:

- All School Play
- Art Society
- Cheerleading
- Debate
- FFA
- Thespian Society
- Key Club
- Musical
- National Honor Society
- Show Choir
- Yearbook Staff

== See also ==
- List of high schools in Iowa
