= Graettinger Community School District =

Defunct school district in Iowa, United States

Graettinger Community School District was a school district headquartered in Graettinger, Iowa.

On July 1, 2010, it merged with the Terril Community School District to form the Graettinger–Terril Community School District.
