= Waterford Township, Clay County, Iowa =

Township in Iowa, US

Waterford Township
- Township
- Location in Clay County
- Coordinates: 43°12′51″N 095°19′45″W
- Country: United States
- State: Iowa
- County: Clay

Area
  - Total: 35.56 sq mi (92.11 km^{2})
  - Land: 35.55 sq mi (92.08 km^{2})
  - Water: 0.012 sq mi (0.03 km^{2}) 0.03%
- Elevation: 1,381 ft (421 m)

Population (2000)
  - Total: 209
  - Density: 6.0/sq mi (2.3/km^{2})
- GNIS feature ID: 0468948

Waterford Township is a township in Clay County, Iowa, USA. As of the 2000 census, its population was 209.

== History ==
Waterford Township was created in 1884.

== Geography ==
Waterford Township covers an area of 35.56 square miles (92.1 km^{2}) and contains no incorporated settlements. According to the USGS, it contains one cemetery, First Reformed Church.
