= Superior, Iowa =

- City
- Location of Superior, Iowa
- Coordinates: 43°26′01″N 94°56′48″W
- Country: United States
- State: Iowa
- County: Dickinson

Area
  - Total: 0.43 sq mi (1.11 km^{2})
  - Land: 0.43 sq mi (1.11 km^{2})
  - Water: 0 sq mi (0.00 km^{2})
- Elevation: 1,493 ft (455 m)

Population (2020)
  - Total: 132
  - Density: 307.6/sq mi (118.77/km^{2})
- Time zone: UTC-6 (Central (CST))
  - Summer (DST): UTC-5 (CDT)
- ZIP code: 51363
- Area code: 712
- FIPS code: 19-76440
- GNIS feature ID: 2396008

Superior is a city in Dickinson County, Iowa, United States. The population was 132 at the time of the 2020 census.

== History ==
Superior began its historic existence in 1882 when the railroad was built through the neighborhood.

== Geography ==
According to the United States Census Bureau, the city has a total area of 0.41 square miles (1.06 km^{2}), all land.

== Demographics ==
Historical populations
Year	Pop.	±%
1900	187	—
1910	154	−17.6%
1920	200	+29.9%
1930	168	−16.0%
1940	230	+36.9%
1950	240	+4.3%
1960	190	−20.8%
1970	139	−26.8%
1980	188	+35.3%
1990	128	−31.9%
2000	142	+10.9%
2010	130	−8.5%
2020	132	+1.5%
Source:"U.S. Census website". United States Census Bureau. and Iowa Data Center; Source: U.S. Decennial Census

=== 2020 census ===
As of the census of 2020, there were 132 people, 45 households, and 32 families residing in the city. The population density was 307.6 inhabitants per square mile (118.8/km^{2}). There were 56 housing units at an average density of 130.5 per square mile (50.4/km^{2}). The racial makeup of the city was 96.2% White, 0.0% Black or African American, 0.0% Native American, 1.5% Asian, 0.0% Pacific Islander, 0.8% from other races and 1.5% from two or more races. Hispanic or Latino persons of any race comprised 2.3% of the population.

Of the 45 households, 33.3% of which had children under the age of 18 living with them, 57.8% were married couples living together, 2.2% were cohabitating couples, 20.0% had a female householder with no spouse or partner present and 20.0% had a male householder with no spouse or partner present. 28.9% of all households were non-families. 24.4% of all households were made up of individuals, 17.8% had someone living alone who was 65 years old or older.

The median age in the city was 41.5 years. 28.0% of the residents were under the age of 20; 8.3% were between the ages of 20 and 24; 20.5% were from 25 and 44; 25.8% were from 45 and 64; and 17.4% were 65 years of age or older. The gender makeup of the city was 55.3% male and 44.7% female.

=== 2010 census ===
As of the census of 2010, there were 130 people, 52 households, and 34 families living in the city. The population density was 317.1 inhabitants per square mile (122.4/km^{2}). There were 60 housing units at an average density of 146.3 per square mile (56.5/km^{2}). The racial makeup of the city was 99.2% White and 0.8% from two or more races. Hispanic or Latino of any race were 1.5% of the population.

There were 52 households, of which 26.9% had children under the age of 18 living with them, 50.0% were married couples living together, 7.7% had a female householder with no husband present, 7.7% had a male householder with no wife present, and 34.6% were non-families. 28.8% of all households were made up of individuals, and 9.6% had someone living alone who was 65 years of age or older. The average household size was 2.50 and the average family size was 2.97.

The median age in the city was 44.5 years. 22.3% of residents were under the age of 18; 6.9% were between the ages of 18 and 24; 21.5% were from 25 to 44; 33.1% were from 45 to 64; and 16.2% were 65 years of age or older. The gender makeup of the city was 53.1% male and 46.9% female.

=== 2000 census ===
As of the census of 2000, there were 142 people, 57 households, and 40 families living in the city. The population density was 336.0 inhabitants per square mile (129.7/km^{2}). There were 64 housing units at an average density of 151.4 per square mile (58.5/km^{2}). The racial makeup of the city was 99.30% White and 0.70% Asian. Hispanic or Latino of any race were 2.11% of the population.

There were 57 households, out of which 28.1% had children under the age of 18 living with them, 61.4% were married couples living together, 3.5% had a female householder with no husband present, and 29.8% were non-families. 24.6% of all households were made up of individuals, and 15.8% had someone living alone who was 65 years of age or older. The average household size was 2.49 and the average family size was 3.03.

In the city, the population was spread out, with 26.1% under the age of 18, 7.0% from 18 to 24, 26.1% from 25 to 44, 26.8% from 45 to 64, and 14.1% who were 65 years of age or older. The median age was 40 years. For every 100 females, there were 118.5 males. For every 100 females age 18 and over, there were 105.9 males.

The median income for a household in the city was $35,000, and the median income for a family was $39,250. Males had a median income of $28,333 versus $21,250 for females. The per capita income for the city was $25,486. There were none of the families and 3.3% of the population living below the poverty line, including no under eighteens and none of those over 64.

== Education ==
Estherville–Lincoln Central Community School District operates area public schools. It was established on July 1, 1997, by the merger of the Estherville and Lincoln Central school districts. The northwest portion of town is served by Spirit Lake Community School District.
