= Arnolds Park, Iowa =

- City
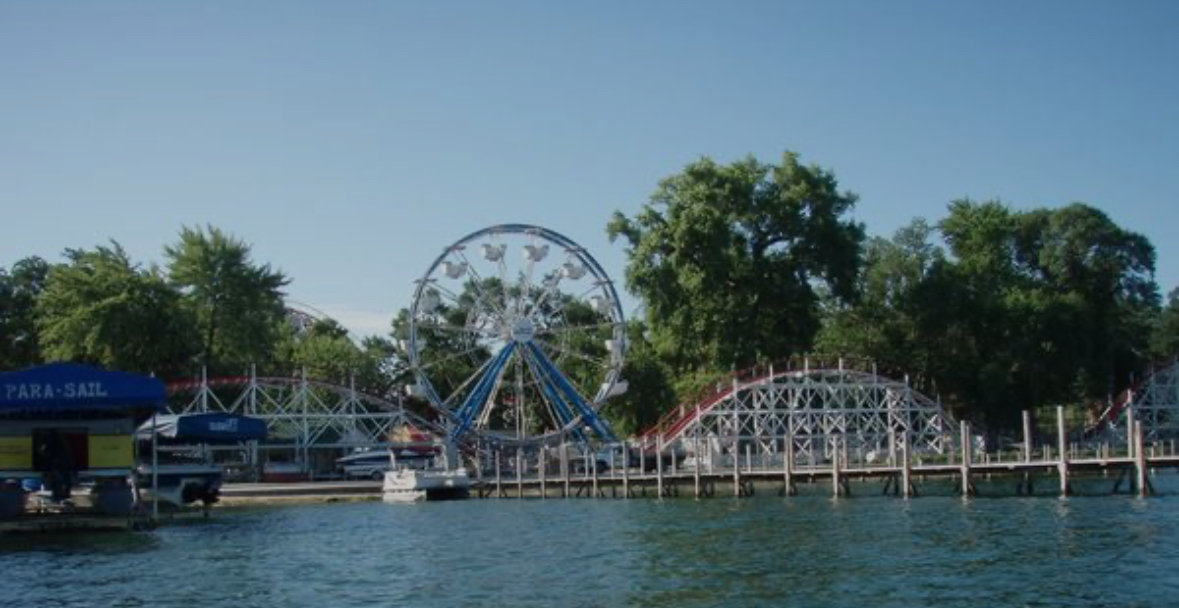
- A view of Arnolds Park from Lake Okoboji

- Location of Arnolds Park, Iowa
- Coordinates: 43°21′56″N 95°07′17″W
- Country: United States
- State: Iowa
- County: Dickinson

Area
  - Total: 1.79 sq mi (4.63 km^{2})
  - Land: 1.59 sq mi (4.13 km^{2})
  - Water: 0.19 sq mi (0.50 km^{2})
- Elevation: 1,398 ft (426 m)

Population (2020)
  - Total: 1,110
  - Density: 695.8/sq mi (268.66/km^{2})
- Time zone: UTC-6 (Central (CST))
  - Summer (DST): UTC-5 (CDT)
- ZIP code: 51331
- Area code: 712
- FIPS code: 19-03025
- GNIS feature ID: 2393992
- Website: City of Arnolds Park

Arnolds Park is a city in Dickinson County, Iowa, United States. The population was 1,110 in the 2020 census, a decline from the 1,162 population in the 2000 census.

== Geography ==
According to the United States Census Bureau, the city has a total area of 1.57 square miles (4.07 km^{2}), all land.

=== Coordination of Arnolds Park ===
Arnolds Park is located at 43°21′56″N 95°7′47″W (43.365636, -95.129805).

== Demographics ==
Historical population
Census	Pop.	Note	%±
1900	251		—
1910	273		8.8%
1920	478		75.1%
1930	597		24.9%
1940	855		43.2%
1950	1,078		26.1%
1960	953		−11.6%
1970	970		1.8%
1980	1,051		8.4%
1990	953		−9.3%
2000	1,162		21.9%
2010	1,126		−3.1%
2020	1,110		−1.4%
U.S. Decennial Census

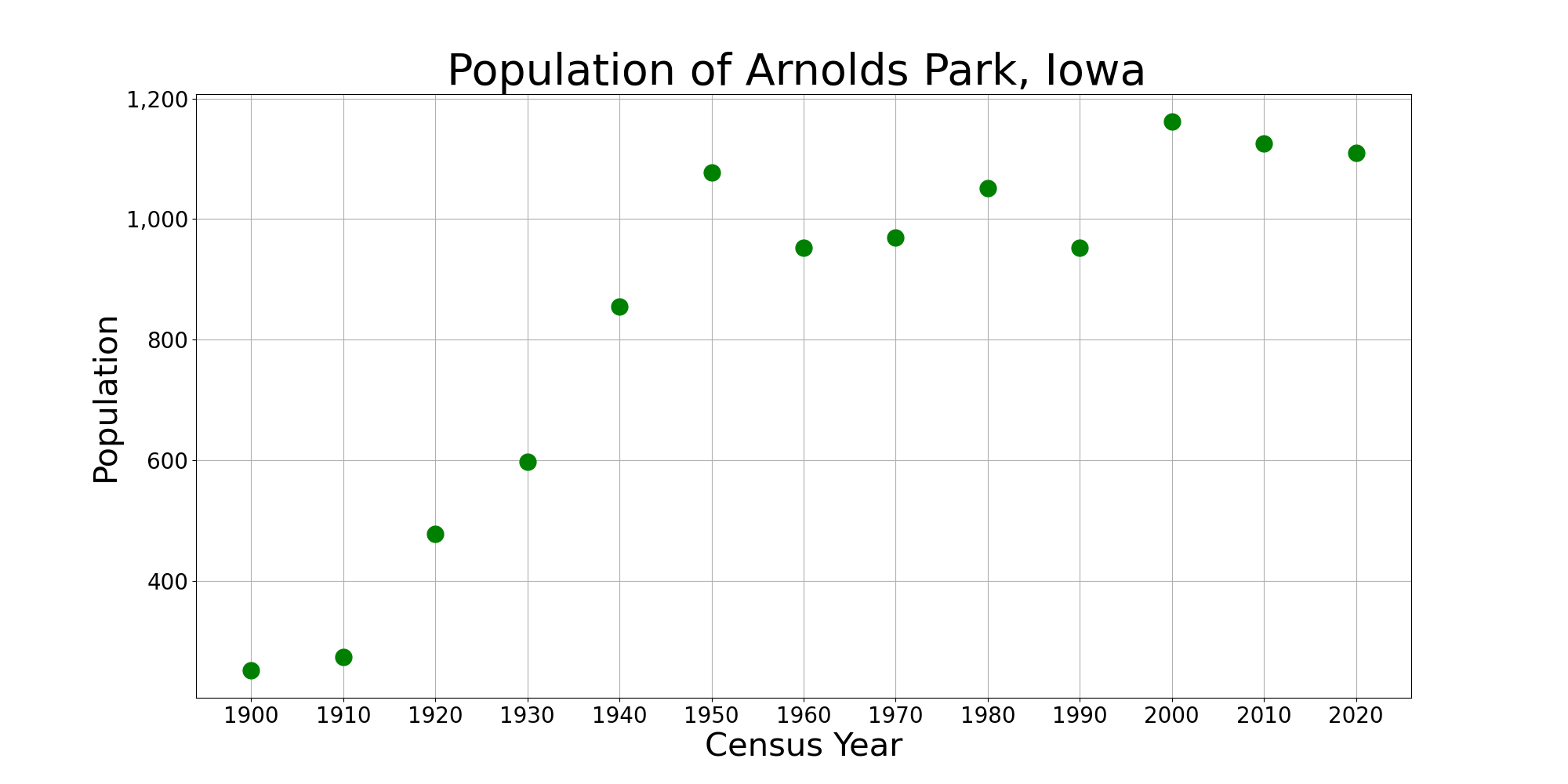
The population of Arnolds Park, Iowa from US census data

=== 2020 census ===
As of the 2020 census, there were 1,110 people, 588 households, and 350 families residing in the city. The population density was 695.8 inhabitants per square mile (268.7/km^{2}). There were 1,832 housing units at an average density of 1,148.4 per square mile (443.4/km^{2}).

The median age in the city was 60.8 years. 8.6% of residents were under the age of 18, 10.2% were under the age of 20, 3.2% were from 20 to 24, 15.2% were from 25 to 44, 33.0% were from 45 to 64, and 38.4% were 65 years of age or older. For every 100 females there were 100.7 males, and for every 100 females age 18 and over there were 104.8 males age 18 and over. The gender makeup of the city was 50.2% male and 49.8% female.

Of all households, 11.1% had children under the age of 18 living with them; 53.4% were married-couple households; 3.6% were cohabiting-couple households; 19.7% had a female householder with no spouse or partner present; and 23.3% had a male householder with no spouse or partner present. About 40.5% of all households were non-families, 36.4% were made up of individuals, and 16.3% had someone living alone who was 65 years of age or older.

Of housing units in the city, 67.9% were vacant. The homeowner vacancy rate was 2.3% and the rental vacancy rate was 38.4%. 100.0% of residents lived in urban areas, while 0.0% lived in rural areas.

Racial composition as of the 2020 census
Race	Number	Percent
White	1,079	97.2%
Black or African American	1	0.1%
American Indian and Alaska Native	0	0.0%
Asian	2	0.2%
Native Hawaiian and Other Pacific Islander	0	0.0%
Some other race	7	0.6%
Two or more races	21	1.9%
Hispanic or Latino (of any race)	17	1.5%

=== 2010 census ===
At the 2010 census there were 1,126 people, 590 households, and 334 families living in the city. The population density was 717.2 inhabitants per square mile (276.9/km^{2}). There were 1,516 housing units at an average density of 965.6 per square mile (372.8/km^{2}). The racial makeup of the city was 99.1% White, 0.2% African American, 0.1% Native American, 0.1% from other races, and 0.5% from two or more races. Hispanic or Latino of any race were 0.3%.

Of the 590 households 11.5% had children under the age of 18 living with them, 49.3% were married couples living together, 4.6% had a female householder with no husband present, 2.7% had a male householder with no wife present, and 43.4% were non-families. 35.1% of households were one person and 15.6% were one person aged 65 or older. The average household size was 1.90 and the average family size was 2.38.

The median age was 56.6 years. 10.1% of residents were under the age of 18; 5.4% were between the ages of 18 and 24; 17% were from 25 to 44; 35.4% were from 45 to 64; and 32.1% were 65 or older. The gender makeup of the city was 51.5% male and 48.5% female.

=== 2000 census ===
At the 2000 census there were 1,162 people, 580 households, and 349 families living in the city. The population density was 896.1 inhabitants per square mile (346.0/km^{2}). There were 1,147 housing units at an average density of 884.5 per square mile (341.5/km^{2}). The racial makeup of the city was 97.50% White, 0.26% African American, 0.77% Native American, 0.09% Asian, 0.09% Pacific Islander, 0.09% from other races, and 1.20% from two or more races. Hispanic or Latino of any race were 0.17%.

Of the 580 households 17.4% had children under the age of 18 living with them, 52.1% were married couples living together, 5.7% had a female householder with no husband present, and 39.8% were non-families. 33.4% of households were one person and 14.5% were one person aged 65 or older. The average household size was 2.00 and the average family size was 2.50.

The age distribution was 15.5% under the age of 18, 6.2% from 18 to 24, 23.0% from 25 to 44, 31.6% from 45 to 64, and 23.8% 65 or older. The median age was 48 years. For every 100 females, there were 98.3 males. For every 100 females age 18 and over, there were 100.0 males.

The median household income was $35,441 and the median family income was $43,594. Males had a median income of $29,211 versus $20,766 for females. The per capita income for the city was $24,072. About 3.9% of families and 5.4% of the population were below the poverty line, including 3.8% of those under age 18 and 5.0% of those age 65 or over.

== Arts and culture ==
=== Arnolds Park Amusement Park ===
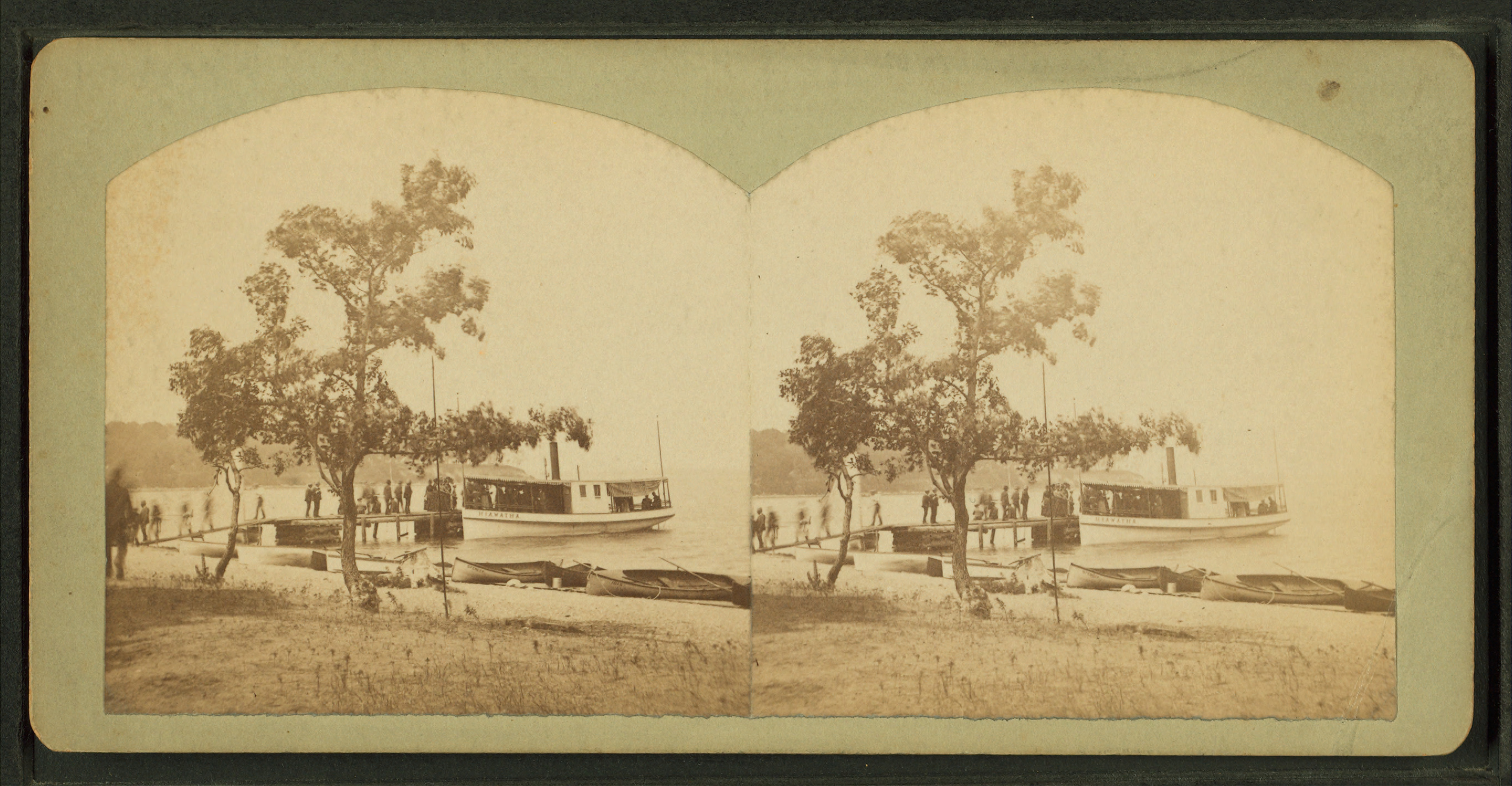
Passengers leaving the 'Hiawatha' at Arnold's Park on West Okobji Lake (1883)

Arnolds Park is in the center of the Iowa Great Lakes resort region. It is home to a historic amusement park, also called Arnolds Park, which features Legend, An ACE Coaster Landmark. Legend, which carried its first riders in 1927, is believed to be the 13th oldest wooden roller coaster in the U.S. In 2012 the amusement park was selected as one of the fifteen best in the Midwest region by Midwest Living magazine.

=== Other landmarks ===
Other major landmarks of the city include the Central Emporium shopping mall and the Iowa Great Lakes Maritime Museum and the Iowa Rock 'n' Roll Hall of Fame.

Rock'n'Roll has a storied history in the area. The old Roof Garden Ballroom in Arnolds Park, on West Lake Okoboji, for example, once attracted the likes of Jerry Lee Lewis, the Everly Brothers, the Guess Who and even country music legend, Johnny Cash, according to The Daily Globe, a Worthington, Minnesota-based newspaper. The Coney Island-style dance hall was housed on the second floor of a two-story wooden structure (the first floor housed a gift shop and a funhouse, the latter extending into an adjoining structure). The original Roof Garden / Funhouse / theater was razed in 1987, during a transition of ownership.

One musician who played The Roof Garden said BJ Thomas, during a pre-show rehearsal, tossed sheet music in Burt Bacharach's own handwriting to the band so they could rehearse, "Raindrops Keep Falling on My Head." "Musical magic seemed to happen all the time in Arnolds Park", says one article. A new Roof Garden debuted in 2019 near its original location in the amusement park and closely resembles the iconic original, including the name in letters large enough to be seen across the lake.

Located in Arnolds Park is the Abbie Gardner Sharp Cabin Museum, a site of the 1857 "Spirit Lake Massacre", a violent conflict between European settlers and Native Americans. Next to the cabin is the small Pillsbury Point State Park.

== Education ==
The community is served by the Okoboji Community School District. The district was established on July 1, 1988, by the merger of the Arnolds Park and Milford school districts. Okoboji High School in Milford is the local high school.

== Notable person ==
- Maynard Reece (1920–2020) artist, won the Federal Duck Stamp competition a record five times
