= Dickinson County, Iowa =

County in Iowa, United States

- County
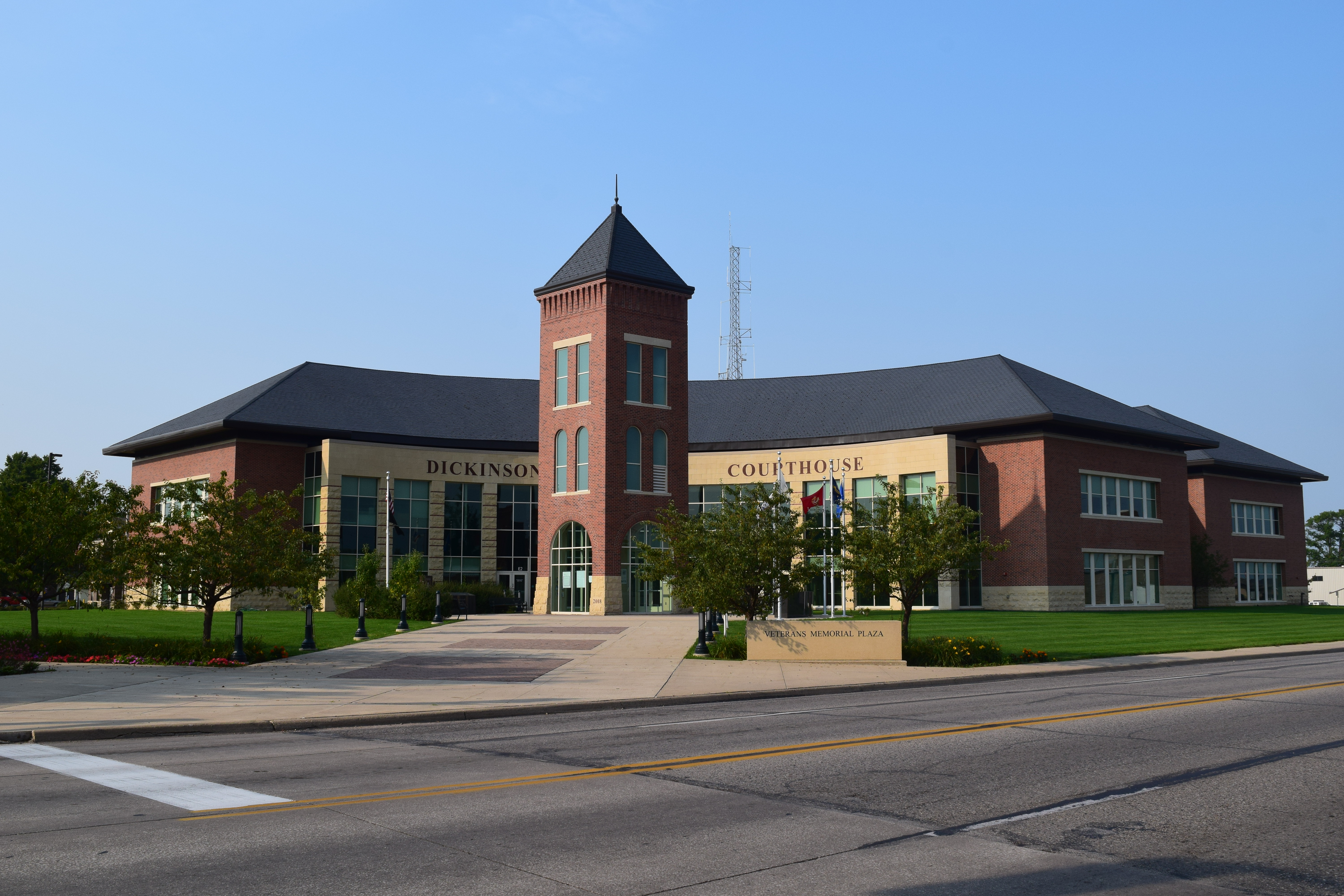
- Dickinson County Courthouse

- Location within the U.S. state of Iowa
- Coordinates: 43°22′33″N 95°08′59″W
- Country: United States
- State: Iowa
- Founded: 1857
- Named for: Daniel S. Dickinson
- Seat: Spirit Lake
- Largest city: Spirit Lake

Area
  - Total: 404 sq mi (1,050 km^{2})
  - Land: 381 sq mi (990 km^{2})
  - Water: 23 sq mi (60 km^{2}) 5.8%

Population (2020)
  - Total: 17,703
  - Estimate (2025): 18,077 ▲
  - Density: 46.5/sq mi (17.9/km^{2})
- Time zone: UTC−6 (Central)
  - Summer (DST): UTC−5 (CDT)
- Congressional district: 4th
- Website: dickinsoncountyiowa.gov
- Iowa county number 30

Dickinson County is a county located in the U.S. state of Iowa. As of the 2020 census, the population was 17,703. The county seat is Spirit Lake. The county was organized in 1857 and is named in honor of Daniel S. Dickinson, a U.S. Senator for New York.

Dickinson County comprises the Spirit Lake, IA Micropolitan Statistical Area.

== Geography ==
According to the U.S. Census Bureau, the county has a total area of 404 square miles (1,050 km^{2}), of which 381 square miles (990 km^{2}) is land and 23 square miles (60 km^{2}) (5.8%) is water. It is the smallest county by land area in Iowa, and the fifth-smallest by total area.

A region known as the Iowa Great Lakes is in Dickinson County, making it a popular vacation destination for Iowans, and explaining the recent high population growth in the area. The lakes include West Okoboji Lake, East Okoboji Lake, and Spirit Lake.

=== Major highways ===
- U.S. Highway 71
- Iowa Highway 9
- Iowa Highway 86

=== Adjacent counties ===
- Jackson County, Minnesota (north)
- Emmet County (east)
- Clay County (south)
- Osceola County (west)

== Demographics ==
Historical population
Census	Pop.	Note	%±
1860	180		—
1870	1,389		671.7%
1880	1,901		36.9%
1890	4,328		127.7%
1900	7,995		84.7%
1910	8,137		1.8%
1920	10,241		25.9%
1930	10,982		7.2%
1940	12,185		11.0%
1950	12,756		4.7%
1960	12,574		−1.4%
1970	12,565		−0.1%
1980	15,629		24.4%
1990	14,909		−4.6%
2000	16,424		10.2%
2010	16,667		1.5%
2020	17,703		6.2%
2025 (est.)	18,077	▲	2.1%
U.S. Decennial Census; 1790-1960 1900-1990; 1990-2000 2010-2018

=== 2020 census ===
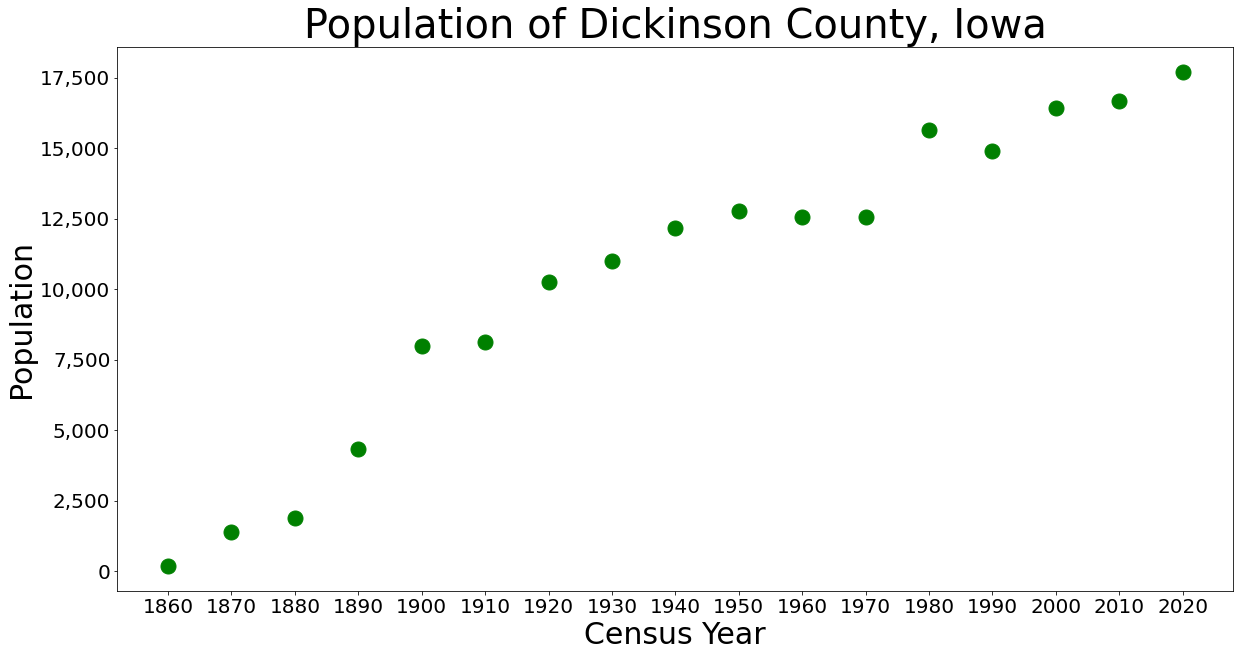
Population of Dickinson County from US census data

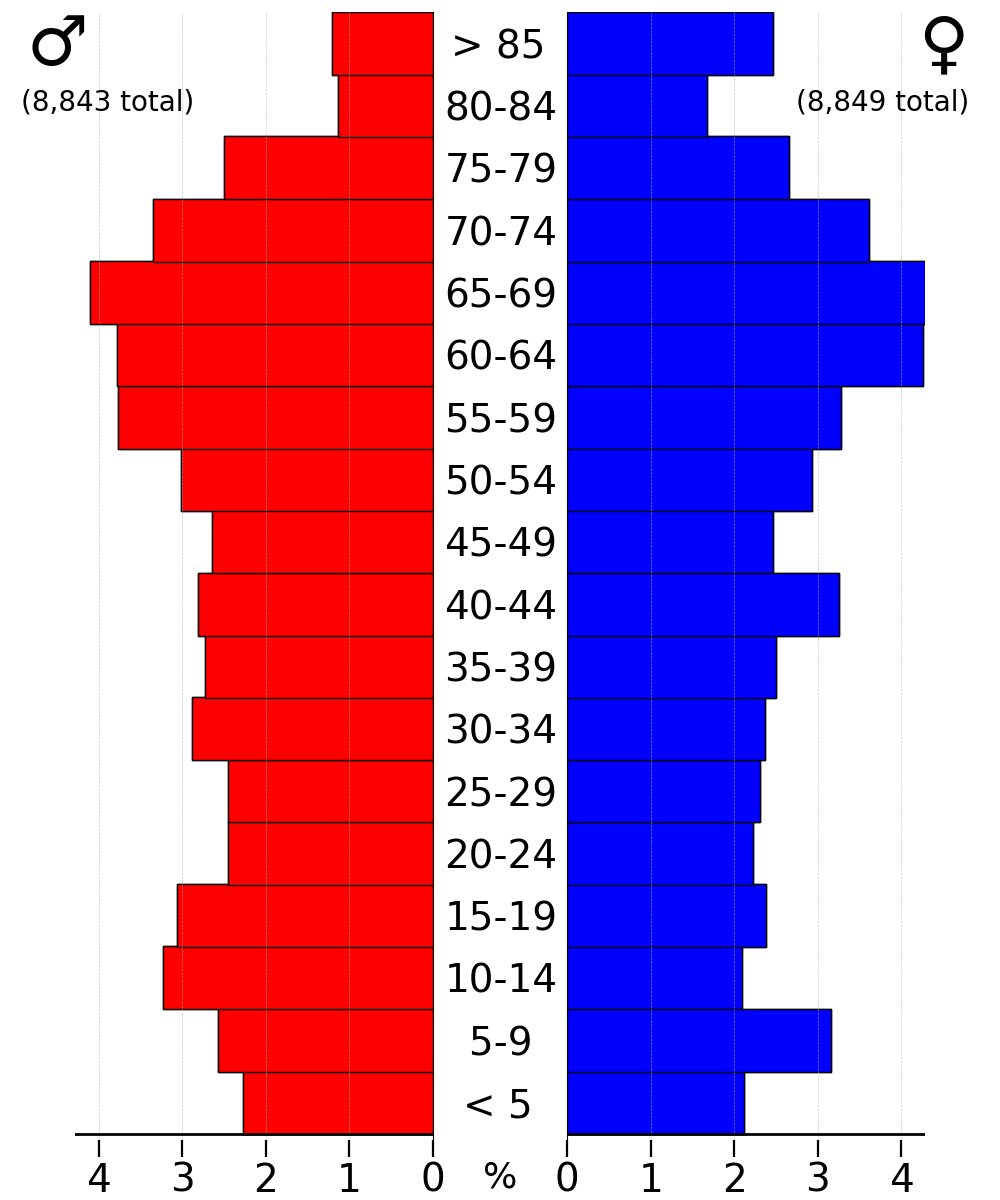
2022 US Census population pyramid for Dickinson County from ACS 5-year estimates

As of the 2020 census, the county had a population of 17,703 and a population density of 43.7/sq mi (16.9/km^{2}). The median age was 49.1 years, with 19.0% of residents under the age of 18 and 27.5% aged 65 years or older. For every 100 females there were 97.5 males, and for every 100 females age 18 and over there were 95.2 males age 18 and over.

96.84% of the population reported being of one race; of these, 92.71% were non-Hispanic White, 0.45% were Black, 0.12% were Native American, 0.46% were Asian, 0.01% were Native Hawaiian or Pacific Islander, and 3.96% were some other race or reported two or more races. Overall, the racial makeup of the county was 95.0% White, 0.4% Black, 0.1% American Indian and Alaska Native, 0.5% Asian, less than 0.1% Native Hawaiian and Pacific Islander, 0.8% some other race, and 3.2% two or more races, with Hispanic or Latino residents of any race comprising 2.3% of the population.

73.2% of residents lived in urban areas, while 26.8% lived in rural areas.

There were 7,976 households in the county, of which 22.5% had children under the age of 18 living in them. Of all households, 52.7% were married-couple households, 18.4% were households with a male householder and no spouse or partner present, and 22.9% were households with a female householder and no spouse or partner present. About 31.5% of all households were made up of individuals and 14.8% had someone living alone who was 65 years of age or older. There were 13,691 housing units, of which 41.7% were vacant. Among occupied housing units, 78.2% were owner-occupied and 21.8% were renter-occupied. The homeowner vacancy rate was 1.8% and the rental vacancy rate was 13.5%.

=== 2010 census ===
The 2010 census recorded a population of 16,667 in the county, with a population density of 43.7/sq mi (16.9/km^{2}). There were 12,849 housing units, of which 7,554 were occupied.

=== 2000 census ===
As of the census of 2000, there were 16,424 people, 7,103 households, and 4,759 families residing in the county. The population density was 43 inhabitants per square mile (17/km^{2}). There were 11,375 housing units at an average density of 30 per square mile (12/km^{2}). The racial makeup of the county was 98.90% White, 0.18% Black or African American, 0.21% Native American, 0.18% Asian, 0.01% Pacific Islander, 0.10% from other races, and 0.43% from two or more races. 0.66% of the population were Hispanic or Latino of any race.

There were 7,103 households, out of which 26.10% had children under the age of 18 living with them, 57.80% were married couples living together, 6.70% had a female householder with no husband present, and 33.00% were non-families. 28.60% of all households were made up of individuals, and 13.70% had someone living alone who was 65 years of age or older. The average household size was 2.27 and the average family size was 2.78.

In the county, the population was spread out, with 21.90% under the age of 18, 6.60% from 18 to 24, 23.90% from 25 to 44, 26.90% from 45 to 64, and 20.60% who were 65 years of age or older. The median age was 43 years. For every 100 females, there were 95.00 males. For every 100 females age 18 and over, there were 92.30 males.

The median income for a household in the county was $39,020, and the median income for a family was $47,739. Males had a median income of $30,523 versus $22,131 for females. The per capita income for the county was $21,929. 6.00% of the population and 4.20% of families were below the poverty line. Out of the total people living in poverty 5.90% of those under the age of 18 and 7.00% of those 65 and older were living below the poverty line.

== Communities ==
=== Cities ===
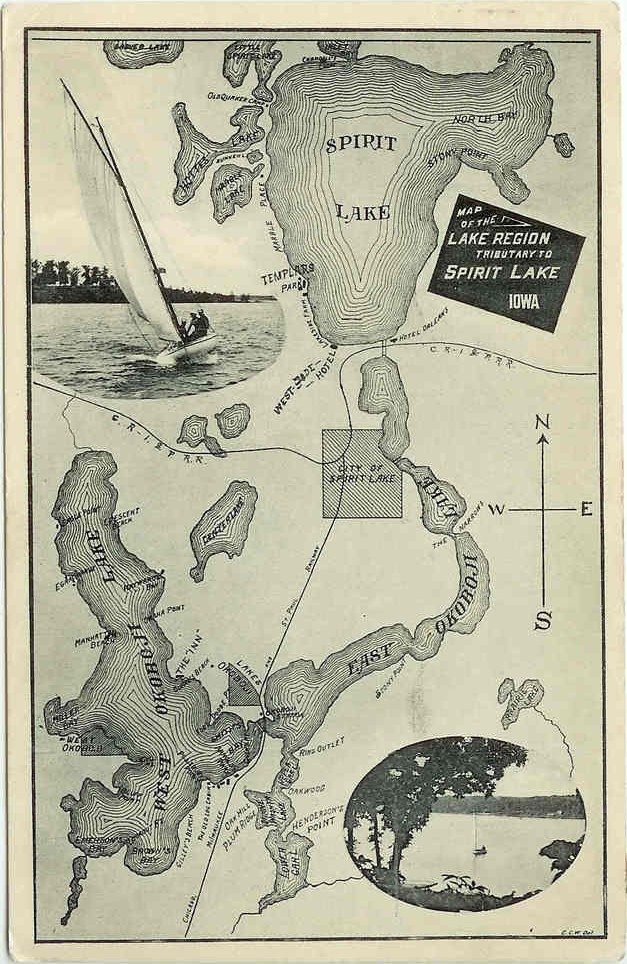
A picture postcard postmarked Okoboji Iowa Aug 1, 1907

- Arnolds Park
- Lake Park
- Milford
- Okoboji
- Orleans
- Spirit Lake
- Superior
- Terril
- Wahpeton
- West Okoboji

=== Unincorporated community ===
- Montgomery

=== Townships ===
Dickinson County is divided into twelve townships:

- Center Grove
- Diamond Lake
- Excelsior
- Lakeville
- Lloyd
- Milford
- Okoboji
- Richland
- Silver Lake
- Spirit Lake
- Superior
- Westport

=== Population ranking ===
The population ranking of the following table is based on the 2020 census of Dickinson County. † county seat

Rank	City/Town/etc.	Municipal type	Population (2020 Census)
1	† Spirit Lake	City	5,439
2	Milford	City	3,321
3	Lake Park	City	1,167
4	Arnolds Park	City	1,110
5	Okoboji	City	768
6	Orleans	City	521
7	Wahpeton	City	345
8	Terril	City	334
9	West Okoboji	City	308
10	Superior	City	132

== Politics ==
United States presidential election results for Dickinson County, Iowa
Year	Republican		Democratic		Third party(ies)	
Year	No.	%	No.	%	No.	%
1896	1,131	67.36%	517	30.79%	31	1.85%
1900	1,352	73.16%	445	24.08%	51	2.76%
1904	1,320	78.01%	312	18.44%	60	3.55%
1908	1,109	66.57%	503	30.19%	54	3.24%
1912	457	24.54%	502	26.96%	903	48.50%
1916	1,249	57.24%	893	40.93%	40	1.83%
1920	3,298	80.42%	760	18.53%	43	1.05%
1924	2,967	66.18%	435	9.70%	1,081	24.11%
1928	3,045	70.57%	1,251	28.99%	19	0.44%
1932	2,074	44.07%	2,500	53.12%	132	2.80%
1936	2,322	40.10%	3,399	58.69%	70	1.21%
1940	2,736	47.65%	2,985	51.99%	21	0.37%
1944	2,133	46.10%	2,473	53.45%	21	0.45%
1948	2,304	48.34%	2,324	48.76%	138	2.90%
1952	4,401	71.05%	1,748	28.22%	45	0.73%
1956	3,641	59.14%	2,498	40.57%	18	0.29%
1960	3,575	56.99%	2,696	42.98%	2	0.03%
1964	2,443	41.14%	3,490	58.77%	5	0.08%
1968	3,472	56.45%	2,286	37.16%	393	6.39%
1972	3,739	58.60%	2,373	37.19%	269	4.22%
1976	3,795	54.14%	3,074	43.85%	141	2.01%
1980	4,028	54.13%	2,620	35.21%	794	10.67%
1984	4,064	56.68%	3,025	42.19%	81	1.13%
1988	3,678	51.80%	3,342	47.06%	81	1.14%
1992	3,196	38.49%	3,106	37.40%	2,002	24.11%
1996	3,129	40.92%	3,562	46.59%	955	12.49%
2000	4,225	52.03%	3,660	45.07%	236	2.91%
2004	5,337	55.87%	4,140	43.34%	76	0.80%
2008	5,162	52.10%	4,625	46.68%	120	1.21%
2012	5,912	58.19%	4,095	40.31%	152	1.50%
2016	6,753	65.22%	3,056	29.52%	545	5.26%
2020	7,438	66.15%	3,661	32.56%	145	1.29%
2024	7,775	69.21%	3,297	29.35%	162	1.44%

== See also ==
- National Register of Historic Places listings in Dickinson County, Iowa
