= West Okoboji, Iowa =

- City
- Location of West Okoboji, Iowa
- Coordinates: 43°20′56″N 95°09′49″W
- Country: United States
- State: Iowa
- County: Dickinson

Area
  - Total: 1.38 sq mi (3.57 km^{2})
  - Land: 1.25 sq mi (3.25 km^{2})
  - Water: 0.12 sq mi (0.32 km^{2})
- Elevation: 1,401 ft (427 m)

Population (2020)
  - Total: 308
  - Density: 245.6/sq mi (94.81/km^{2})
- Time zone: UTC-6 (Central (CST))
  - Summer (DST): UTC-5 (CDT)
- ZIP code: 51351
- Area code: 712
- FIPS code: 19-84450
- GNIS feature ID: 2397271
- Website: cityofwestokoboji.org

West Okoboji is a city in Dickinson County, Iowa, United States. The population was 308 at the time of the 2020 census. The city is located on West Okoboji Lake, from which it takes its name. It is part of the Iowa Great Lakes region.

== Geography ==
According to the United States Census Bureau, the city has a total area of 1.40 square miles (3.63 km^{2}), of which 1.28 square miles (3.32 km^{2}) is land and 0.12 square miles (0.31 km^{2}) is water.

== Demographics ==
Historical populations
Year	Pop.	±%
1930	112	—
1940	117	+4.5%
1950	158	+35.0%
1960	171	+8.2%
1970	210	+22.8%
1980	435	+107.1%
1990	263	−39.5%
2000	432	+64.3%
2010	289	−33.1%
2020	308	+6.6%
Source:"U.S. Census website". United States Census Bureau. and Iowa Data Center; Source: U.S. Decennial Census

These statistics can be skewed by the "summer" population which swells between May and September as West Okoboji, named for the blue water lake of the same name, is a premier vacation city in the area. Lake Okoboji is known as one of the three "true blue water" lakes in the world, due primarily to its glacial origins and spring fed sources.

=== 2020 census ===
As of the census of 2020, there were 308 people, 157 households, and 92 families residing in the city. The population density was 245.5 inhabitants per square mile (94.8/km^{2}). There were 370 housing units at an average density of 295.0 per square mile (113.9/km^{2}). The racial makeup of the city was 97.4% White, 0.0% Black or African American, 0.0% Native American, 0.6% Asian, 0.0% Pacific Islander, 1.0% from other races and 1.0% from two or more races. Hispanic or Latino persons of any race comprised 1.6% of the population.

Of the 157 households, 12.1% of which had children under the age of 18 living with them, 50.3% were married couples living together, 5.1% were cohabitating couples, 31.2% had a female householder with no spouse or partner present and 13.4% had a male householder with no spouse or partner present. 41.4% of all households were non-families. 37.6% of all households were made up of individuals, 23.6% had someone living alone who was 65 years old or older.

The median age in the city was 65.1 years. 13.3% of the residents were under the age of 20; 3.6% were between the ages of 20 and 24; 12.0% were from 25 and 44; 20.5% were from 45 and 64; and 50.6% were 65 years of age or older. The gender makeup of the city was 48.1% male and 51.9% female.

=== 2010 census ===
As of the census of 2010, there were 289 people, 147 households, and 87 families residing in the city. The population density was 225.8 inhabitants per square mile (87.2/km^{2}). There were 382 housing units at an average density of 298.4 per square mile (115.2/km^{2}). The racial makeup of the city was 98.6% White, 0.3% African American, 0.3% from other races, and 0.7% from two or more races. Hispanic or Latino of any race were 1.4% of the population.

There were 147 households, of which 10.9% had children under the age of 18 living with them, 53.7% were married couples living together, 2.7% had a female householder with no husband present, 2.7% had a male householder with no wife present, and 40.8% were non-families. 36.1% of all households were made up of individuals, and 21.1% had someone living alone who was 65 years of age or older. The average household size was 1.97 and the average family size was 2.54.

The median age in the city was 59.5 years. 11.1% of residents were under the age of 18; 4.5% were between the ages of 18 and 24; 11.7% were from 25 to 44; 36.9% were from 45 to 64; and 35.6% were 65 years of age or older. The gender makeup of the city was 47.4% male and 52.6% female.

=== 2000 census ===
As of the census of 2000, there were 432 people, 216 households, and 130 families residing in the city. The population density was 348.2 inhabitants per square mile (134.4/km^{2}). There were 437 housing units at an average density of 352.2 per square mile (136.0/km^{2}). The racial makeup of the city was 97.45% White, 0.93% African American, 0.69% Native American, 0.23% Asian, and 0.69% from two or more races.

There were 216 households, out of which 28.2% had children under the age of 18 living with them, 42.6% were married couples living together, 15.7% had a female householder with no husband present, and 39.4% were non-families. 34.3% of all households were made up of individuals, and 20.4% had someone living alone who was 65 years of age or older. The average household size was 2.00 and the average family size was 2.50.

In the city, the population was spread out, with 22.0% under the age of 18, 13.4% from 18 to 24, 15.0% from 25 to 44, 25.0% from 45 to 64, and 24.5% who were 65 years of age or older. The median age was 45 years. For every 100 females, there were 83.8 males. For every 100 females age 18 and over, there were 71.1 males.

The median income for a household in the city was $32,083, and the median income for a family was $41,250. Males had a median income of $32,500 versus $18,750 for females. The per capita income for the city was $24,853. About 16.2% of families and 16.3% of the population were below the poverty line, including 35.2% of those under age 18 and 5.4% of those age 65 or over.

== Education ==
The community is served by the Okoboji Community School District. The district was established on July 1, 1988 by the merger of the Arnolds Park and Milford school districts. Okoboji High School in Milford is the local high school.
