= Terril Community School District =

Defunct high school in Iowa, United States

Terril Community School District was a school district headquartered in Terril, Iowa.

On July 1, 2010, it merged with the Graettinger Community School District to form the Graettinger–Terril Community School District.
