= Wahpeton, Iowa =

- City
- Motto: "Our Home on Millers Bay"
- Location of Wahpeton, Iowa
- Coordinates: 43°22′39″N 95°10′32″W
- Country: United States
- State: Iowa
- County: Dickinson

Area
  - Total: 1.22 sq mi (3.17 km^{2})
  - Land: 1.20 sq mi (3.10 km^{2})
  - Water: 0.023 sq mi (0.06 km^{2})
- Elevation: 1,398 ft (426 m)

Population (2020)
  - Total: 345
  - Density: 287.9/sq mi (111.16/km^{2})
- Time zone: UTC-6 (Central (CST))
  - Summer (DST): UTC-5 (CDT)
- ZIP code: 51360
- Area code: 712
- FIPS code: 19-81615
- GNIS feature ID: 2397164
- Website: City of Wahpeton, Iowa Website

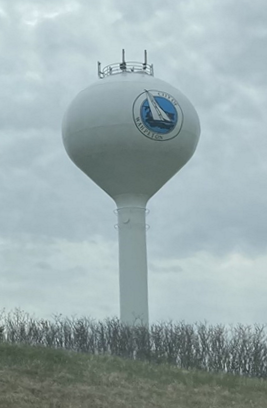
Wahpeton's municipal water tower

Wahpeton is a city in Dickinson County, Iowa, United States. The population was 345 at the time of the 2020 census.

Wahpeton is part of the Iowa Great Lakes region of northwestern Iowa, which is a regional vacation and recreation destination.

== Geography ==
According to the United States Census Bureau, the city has a total area of 1.24 square miles (3.21 km^{2}), of which 1.21 square miles (3.13 km^{2}) is land and 0.03 square miles (0.08 km^{2}) is water.

== Demographics ==
Historical populations
Year	Pop.	±%
1940	73	—
1950	127	+74.0%
1960	117	−7.9%
1970	149	+27.4%
1980	372	+149.7%
1990	484	+30.1%
2000	462	−4.5%
2010	341	−26.2%
2020	345	+1.2%
Source:"U.S. Census website". United States Census Bureau. and Iowa Data Center; Source: U.S. Decennial Census

=== 2020 census ===
As of the census of 2020, there were 345 people, 177 households, and 122 families residing in the city. The population density was 287.9 inhabitants per square mile (111.2/km^{2}). There were 745 housing units at an average density of 621.7 per square mile (240.1/km^{2}). The racial makeup of the city was 97.4% White, 0.0% Black or African American, 0.0% Native American, 1.4% Asian, 0.0% Pacific Islander, 0.0% from other races and 1.2% from two or more races. Hispanic or Latino persons of any race comprised 0.0% of the population.

Of the 177 households, 12.4% of which had children under the age of 18 living with them, 59.3% were married couples living together, 4.5% were cohabitating couples, 23.2% had a female householder with no spouse or partner present and 13.0% had a male householder with no spouse or partner present. 31.1% of all households were non-families. 24.3% of all households were made up of individuals, 12.4% had someone living alone who was 65 years old or older.

The median age in the city was 62.5 years. 11.0% of the residents were under the age of 20; 3.8% were between the ages of 20 and 24; 12.5% were from 25 and 44; 27.8% were from 45 and 64; and 44.9% were 65 years of age or older. The gender makeup of the city was 48.1% male and 51.9% female.

=== 2010 census ===
As of the census of 2010, there were 341 people, 179 households, and 119 families residing in the city. The population density was 281.8 inhabitants per square mile (108.8/km^{2}). There were 743 housing units at an average density of 614.0 per square mile (237.1/km^{2}). The racial makeup of the city was 98.5% White, 0.6% African American, 0.3% Asian, and 0.6% from other races. Hispanic or Latino of any race were 0.3% of the population.

There were 179 households, of which 8.9% had children under the age of 18 living with them, 64.2% were married couples living together, 2.2% had a female householder with no husband present, and 33.5% were non-families. 29.6% of all households were made up of individuals, and 17.9% had someone living alone who was 65 years of age or older. The average household size was 1.91 and the average family size was 2.28.

The median age in the city was 63.1 years. 7.9% of residents were under the age of 18; 5.9% were between the ages of 18 and 24; 8.5% were from 25 to 44; 33.2% were from 45 to 64; and 44.6% were 65 years of age or older. The gender makeup of the city was 48.4% male and 51.6% female.

=== 2000 census ===
As of the census of 2000, there were 462 people, 214 households, and 154 families residing in the city. The population density was 361.1 inhabitants per square mile (139.4/km^{2}). There were 732 housing units at an average density of 572.1 per square mile (220.9/km^{2}). The racial makeup of the city was 99.13% White, 0.43% Asian, 0.22% from other races, and 0.22% from two or more races. Hispanic or Latino of any race were 1.73% of the population.

There were 214 households, out of which 13.6% had children under the age of 18 living with them, 69.2% were married couples living together, 1.9% had a female householder with no husband present, and 28.0% were non-families. 23.8% of all households were made up of individuals, and 16.4% had someone living alone who was 65 years of age or older. The average household size was 2.12 and the average family size was 2.49.

In the city, the population was spread out, with 13.9% under the age of 18, 4.5% from 18 to 24, 13.9% from 25 to 44, 31.8% from 45 to 64, and 35.9% who were 65 years of age or older. The median age was 56 years. For every 100 females, there were 94.1 males. For every 100 females age 18 and over, there were 92.3 males.

The median income for a household in the city was $53,125, and the median income for a family was $62,083. Males had a median income of $41,500 versus $23,125 for females. The per capita income for the city was $36,258. About 4.4% of families and 7.3% of the population were below the poverty line, including 18.2% of those under age 18 and 2.1% of those age 65 or over.

== Arts and culture ==
Gull Point State Park is located in the city, and the city is also the site of three religiously-based summer camps, Lakeshore Center at Okoboji (the Presbyterian Camp of Okoboji), Okoboji Lutheran Bible Camp and Camp Okoboji.

== Education ==
The community is served by the Okoboji Community School District. The district was established on July 1, 1988, by the merger of the Arnolds Park and Milford school districts. Okoboji High School in Milford is the local high school.
