= Milford, Iowa =

- City
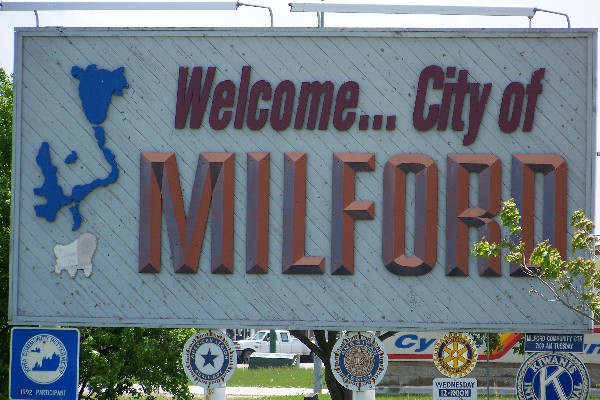
- Welcome sign on U.S. Highway 71

- Location of Milford, Iowa
- Coordinates: 43°20′14″N 95°08′20″W
- Country: United States
- State: Iowa
- County: Dickinson

Area
  - Total: 2.19 sq mi (5.66 km^{2})
  - Land: 2.18 sq mi (5.64 km^{2})
  - Water: 0.012 sq mi (0.03 km^{2})
- Elevation: 1,434 ft (437 m)

Population (2020)
  - Total: 3,321
  - Density: 1,525.3/sq mi (588.93/km^{2})
- Time zone: UTC-6 (Central (CST))
  - Summer (DST): UTC-5 (CDT)
- ZIP code: 51351
- Area code: 712
- FIPS code: 19-52095
- GNIS feature ID: 2395324
- Website: https://milford.ia.us/

Milford is a city in Dickinson County, Iowa, United States. The population was 3,321 at the time of the 2020 census. The town includes many businesses related to its location in the Iowa Great Lakes region and is often referred to as the southern gateway to the Iowa Great Lakes.

== History ==
The Iowa Great Lakes Area was settled in the 1850s. It attracted many colonists because of the rich black soil, water from the lakes, and an abundance of wild game and fish. As the population increased at these times, there was a need for a good flouring mill because the nearest mills were those in Mankato, Minnesota and Fort Dodge, Iowa. In 1861, there was an attempt to build one on Mill Creek, at the outlet of the Great Lakes but the attempt was abandoned after the Dakota-U.S. War of 1862 and the extremely low water level that year. In 1868 one was successfully built, and sawmill was built and put into operation in 1869. The mills began to attract many customers, and the small community began to grow around Old Town. In 1870, the company that operated the mill bought a section of land northwest of Old Town and laid out a plan for the town of Milford.

On March 14, 1892, the first Town Council meeting was held. Some buildings were moved from Old Town to New Town and many more businesses and residences were constructed. In 1921, the U.S. flag was flown at the new city hall for the first time and that year a vote approved to pave Okoboji Avenue (Main Street of Milford). The Milwaukee rail line which ran through Milford supplied the town with mail, groceries, clothing, lumber, coal, and machinery before automobiles could get to the Great Lakes. Two passenger trains made daily trips from Des Moines to Spirit Lake, as well as another from Spencer. Until 1910, excursion trains came to the Lakes Area from Des Moines, Algona, and other towns on weekends and holidays. The last passenger train left Milford for Spencer in 1951. The last freight train left Milford for Spencer in 1976. The tracks were dismantled in 1978 and later became a part of the Iowa Great Lakes Recreational Trail.

== Geography ==
According to the United States Census Bureau, the city has a total area of 2.29 square miles (5.93 km^{2}), of which 2.28 square miles (5.91 km^{2}) is land and 0.01 square miles (0.03 km^{2}) is water.

=== Climate ===
Climate data for Milford, Iowa (1991−2020 normals, extremes 1919−present)
Month	Jan	Feb	Mar	Apr	May	Jun	Jul	Aug	Sep	Oct	Nov	Dec	Year
Record high °F (°C)	63 (17)	65 (18)	85 (29)	93 (34)	98 (37)	102 (39)	103 (39)	102 (39)	100 (38)	92 (33)	78 (26)	67 (19)	103 (39)
Mean maximum °F (°C)	43.5 (6.4)	48.1 (8.9)	67.1 (19.5)	80.7 (27.1)	88.4 (31.3)	91.5 (33.1)	92.5 (33.6)	90.7 (32.6)	87.9 (31.1)	80.6 (27.0)	64.2 (17.9)	47.5 (8.6)	94.7 (34.8)
Mean daily maximum °F (°C)	24.4 (−4.2)	28.9 (−1.7)	41.9 (5.5)	57.2 (14.0)	69.5 (20.8)	79.0 (26.1)	82.6 (28.1)	80.0 (26.7)	73.9 (23.3)	60.0 (15.6)	43.1 (6.2)	29.0 (−1.7)	55.8 (13.2)
Daily mean °F (°C)	15.9 (−8.9)	20.3 (−6.5)	32.7 (0.4)	46.2 (7.9)	58.6 (14.8)	68.8 (20.4)	72.5 (22.5)	70.0 (21.1)	62.8 (17.1)	49.3 (9.6)	33.8 (1.0)	21.1 (−6.1)	46.0 (7.8)
Mean daily minimum °F (°C)	7.5 (−13.6)	11.6 (−11.3)	23.6 (−4.7)	35.2 (1.8)	47.7 (8.7)	58.5 (14.7)	62.4 (16.9)	60.0 (15.6)	51.8 (11.0)	38.5 (3.6)	24.5 (−4.2)	13.2 (−10.4)	36.2 (2.3)
Mean minimum °F (°C)	−16.4 (−26.9)	−10.6 (−23.7)	−0.8 (−18.2)	18.4 (−7.6)	31.9 (−0.1)	46.2 (7.9)	50.3 (10.2)	47.8 (8.8)	34.8 (1.6)	20.6 (−6.3)	4.3 (−15.4)	−10.1 (−23.4)	−19.6 (−28.7)
Record low °F (°C)	−34 (−37)	−28 (−33)	−22 (−30)	2 (−17)	18 (−8)	34 (1)	40 (4)	35 (2)	24 (−4)	−10 (−23)	−14 (−26)	−29 (−34)	−34 (−37)
Average precipitation inches (mm)	0.70 (18)	0.74 (19)	1.61 (41)	3.25 (83)	4.21 (107)	4.47 (114)	3.40 (86)	3.47 (88)	3.21 (82)	2.22 (56)	1.38 (35)	0.84 (21)	29.50 (749)
Average snowfall inches (cm)	8.7 (22)	9.3 (24)	5.3 (13)	2.5 (6.4)	0.1 (0.25)	0.0 (0.0)	0.0 (0.0)	0.0 (0.0)	0.0 (0.0)	0.5 (1.3)	3.0 (7.6)	8.6 (22)	38.0 (97)
Average precipitation days (≥ 0.01 in)	6.8	6.6	6.2	8.2	10.5	9.2	8.2	7.6	7.1	6.2	5.6	6.0	88.2
Average snowy days (≥ 0.1 in)	4.7	4.6	1.8	0.7	0.0	0.0	0.0	0.0	0.0	0.3	2.1	3.9	18.1
Source: NOAA

== Demographics ==
Historical populations
Year	Pop.	±%
1880	235	—
1900	485	+106.4%
1910	575	+18.6%
1920	908	+57.9%
1930	1,062	+17.0%
1940	1,202	+13.2%
1950	1,375	+14.4%
1960	1,476	+7.3%
1970	1,668	+13.0%
1980	2,076	+24.5%
1990	2,170	+4.5%
2000	2,474	+14.0%
2010	2,898	+17.1%
2020	3,321	+14.6%
Source:"U.S. Census website". United States Census Bureau. and Iowa Data Center; Source: U.S. Decennial Census

=== 2020 census ===
As of the 2020 census, Milford had a population of 3,321, with 1,416 households and 879 families residing in the city. The population density was 1,525.3 inhabitants per square mile (588.9/km^{2}). There were 1,566 housing units at an average density of 719.3 per square mile (277.7/km^{2}).

The median age was 41.0 years. 24.6% of residents were under the age of 18 and 20.9% were 65 years of age or older. For every 100 females, there were 98.2 males, and for every 100 females age 18 and over, there were 91.2 males age 18 and over.

Age distribution was 26.7% under the age of 20, 3.8% from 20 to 24, 25.7% from 25 to 44, and 22.9% from 45 to 64.

99.6% of residents lived in urban areas, while 0.4% lived in rural areas.

Among households, 29.5% had children under the age of 18 living with them. Of all households, 47.3% were married-couple households, 7.1% were cohabiting-couple households, 19.1% had a male householder with no spouse or partner present, and 26.5% had a female householder with no spouse or partner present. About 37.9% were non-family households, 32.0% were made up of individuals, and 14.4% had someone living alone who was 65 years of age or older.

Of all housing units, 9.6% were vacant. The homeowner vacancy rate was 1.0% and the rental vacancy rate was 7.5%.

Racial composition as of the 2020 census
Race	Number	Percent
White	3,073	92.5%
Black or African American	27	0.8%
American Indian and Alaska Native	2	0.1%
Asian	21	0.6%
Native Hawaiian and Other Pacific Islander	1	0.0%
Some other race	45	1.4%
Two or more races	152	4.6%
Hispanic or Latino (of any race)	122	3.7%

=== 2010 census ===
As of the census of 2010, there were 2,898 people, 1,276 households, and 802 families residing in the city. The population density was 1,271.1 inhabitants per square mile (490.8/km^{2}). There were 1,414 housing units at an average density of 620.2 per square mile (239.5/km^{2}). The racial makeup of the city was 98.0% White, 0.1% African American, 0.1% Native American, 0.6% Asian, 0.3% from other races, and 0.9% from two or more races. Hispanic or Latino of any race were 1.2% of the population.

There were 1,276 households, of which 28.9% had children under the age of 18 living with them, 48.8% were married couples living together, 9.9% had a female householder with no husband present, 4.2% had a male householder with no wife present, and 37.1% were non-families. 32.3% of all households were made up of individuals, and 13.4% had someone living alone who was 65 years of age or older. The average household size was 2.24 and the average family size was 2.79.

The median age in the city was 41 years. 22.3% of residents were under the age of 18; 6.4% were between the ages of 18 and 24; 25.6% were from 25 to 44; 27.7% were from 45 to 64; and 17.9% were 65 years of age or older. The gender makeup of the city was 49.7% male and 50.3% female.

=== 2000 census ===
As of the census of 2000, there were 2,474 people, 1,042 households, and 670 families residing in the city. The population density was 1,095.5 inhabitants per square mile (423.0/km^{2}). There were 1,128 housing units at an average density of 499.5 per square mile (192.9/km^{2}). The racial makeup of the city was 99.07% White, 0.12% African American, 0.16% Native American, 0.36% Asian, 0.12% from other races, and 0.16% from two or more races. Hispanic or Latino of any race were 0.85% of the population.

There were 1,042 households, out of which 30.8% had children under the age of 18 living with them, 51.9% were married couples living together, 9.6% had a female householder with no husband present, and 35.7% were non-families. 30.2% of all households were made up of individuals, and 15.5% had someone living alone who was 65 years of age or older. The average household size was 2.33 and the average family size was 2.91.

In the city, the population was spread out, with 24.3% under the age of 18, 8.6% from 18 to 24, 27.3% from 25 to 44, 21.2% from 45 to 64, and 18.7% who were 65 years of age or older. The median age was 39 years. For every 100 females, there were 91.2 males. For every 100 females age 18 and over, there were 86.3 males.

The median income for a household in the city was $36,063, and the median income for a family was $42,371. Males had a median income of $28,239 versus $20,815 for females. The per capita income for the city was $16,680. About 4.3% of families and 6.9% of the population were below the poverty line, including 7.2% of those under age 18 and 11.1% of those age 65 or over.

== Parks and recreation ==
Florence Park is located near the high school and offers picnic areas, a large playground, and sessional shelter house available for rent. Memorial Park boasts three ball diamonds, two tennis courts, a basketball court, a horseshoe pitch, volleyball court, playground, two shelters, and a picnic area. Buchanan Park has a playground, a shelter, a basketball court, and a chess table.

=== Recreational Trails ===
The Iowa Great Lakes Trails are a series of recreational trails in the Iowa Great Lakes area that cover almost 30 miles and give citizens and visitors a place to walk, bike, skate, rollerblade, run, and cross-country ski. One end of the 14-mile "spine" of the trail begins in Milford and travels through Arnolds Park and Okoboji to Spirit Lake. Another begins Northwest of Milford and follows Highway 86 along the west side of West Okoboji Lake.

=== Horseshoe Bend Recreational Area ===
Horseshoe Bend Recreational Area is a 180-acre (0.73 km^{2}) county park located approximately five miles southwest of Milford. The park includes picnic areas and a shelter house with modern restroom facilities available for rent. There are 12 primitive campsites, over four miles of mowed trails for hiking, horseback riding, snowmobiling, and cross-country skiing. The park also offers a canoe launch and fishing on the Little Sioux River. On the south end of the park is a winter sports area with skiing and tubing facilities, lifts, and a lodge with modern restroom facilities.

=== Iowa Great Lakes ===
Milford lies on the south end of the Iowa Great Lakes, a popular area that swells the summer population in Dickinson County to about 100,000. visitors and residents enjoy fishing, boating, and swimming in the seven lakes in the Iowa Great Lakes chain.

== Businesses ==
=== Gravel ===
"Milford's Hidden Gold"
Since 1910, businesses have taken advantage of the huge amounts of gravel that is under and surrounds Milford, and was first mined by the Milwaukee Railroad. To the east, west, and south of town there are gravel pits either exhausted and abandoned-some used as junkyards or ones still used that change the face of the Earth almost overnight. Milford Sand & Gravel is one company that mines and washes the gravel for industrial use.

=== Milford Grain Elevator ===
The Milford Elevator has served the Milford Community is a greatly needed accommodation for the farmers of the Milford area. It was owned by Great Lakes Cooperative until April 3, 2008 when it merged with Green Plains Renewable Energy. The grain elevator is now owned and operated by The Andersons.

== Education ==
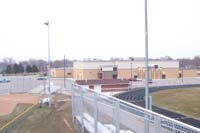
Okoboji High School

Milford is served by the Okoboji Community School District. The district was established on July 1, 1988 by the merger of the Arnolds Park and Milford school districts.

The district operates three schools in the city: Okoboji Community High School, Okoboji Community Middle School, and Okoboji Community Elementary School all of which are part of the Okoboji Community School District. The schools mascot is the Okoboji Pioneer. School colors are maroon and white.

The town also has a library, the Milford Memorial Library.

== Notable people ==
- John L. Bascom, attorney and Iowa State Representative
- Paul Nesbitt, physician and Oklahoma State Legislator
