= Okoboji Community School District =

Public school district in Milford, Iowa, United States

Coordinates: 43.321508°N 95.153322°W

Location
- Milford, Iowa Dickinson County and Clay County United States
- Coordinates: 43.321508, -95.153322

District information
- Type: Local school district
- Grades: K-12
- Established: 1988
- Superintendent: Will Dible
- Schools: 3
- Budget: $21,253,000 (2020-21)
- NCES District ID: 1900021

Students and staff
- Students: 1244 (2022-23)
- Teachers: 89.94 FTE
- Staff: 110.68 FTE
- Student–teacher ratio: 13.83
- Athletic conference: Siouxland
- District mascot: Pioneers
- Colors: Maroon and White

Other information
- Website: www.okobojischools.org

Okoboji Community School District (OCSD) is a rural public school district headquartered in Milford, Iowa. It operates Okoboji Elementary School (Milford), Okoboji Middle School (Milford), and Okoboji High School (Milford).

The logo of the district is the pioneer and is used to show the district giving direction to its pupils.

The district is mostly in Dickinson County with a portion in Clay County. It serves Milford, Arnolds Park, most of Fostoria, most of Okoboji, Wahpeton, and West Okoboji.

== History ==
The district was established on July 1, 1988, by the merger of the Arnolds Park and Milford school districts.

In 2018, the district proposed a $25 million bond for rebuilding its middle school facility.

== Schools ==
The district operates three schools:

- Okoboji Elementary School, Milford
- Okoboji Middle School, Milford
- Okoboji High School, Milford

== See also ==
- List of school districts in Iowa
