= Spirit Lake Community School District =

Public school district in Spirit Lake, Iowa, United States

Coordinates: 43.416364°N 95.101491°W

Location
- Spirit Lake, Iowa Dickinson County United States
- Coordinates: 43.416364, -95.101491

District information
- Type: Local school district
- Grades: K-12
- Superintendent: Dr. David Smith
- Schools: 3
- Budget: $17,851,000 (2020-21)
- NCES District ID: 1927000

Students and staff
- Students: 1304 (2022-23)
- Teachers: 81.96 FTE
- Staff: 92.12 FTE
- Student–teacher ratio: 15.91
- Athletic conference: Siouxland Conference
- District mascot: Indians
- Colors: Red and Black

Other information
- Website: www.spirit-lake.k12.ia.us

The Spirit Lake Community School District is a rural public school district based in Spirit Lake, Iowa, United States. In addition to Spirit Lake, the district also serves Orleans, portions of Okoboji and Superior, as well as rural areas in north central and northeastern Dickinson County.

== Schools ==
- Spirit Lake High School (grades 9–12)
- Spirit Lake Middle School (grades 5–8)
- Spirit Lake Elementary School (grades K–4)

=== Spirit Lake High School ===
==== Athletics ====
The Indians compete in the Siouxland Conference in the following sports:

- Baseball (boys)
- Basketball (boys and girls)
- Cross Country (boys and girls)
  - Boys' Two-time Class 2A State Champions (2008, 2009)
- Football
  - Two-time Class 2A State Champions (2012, 2015)
- Golf (boys and girls)
- Soccer (boys and girls)
- Softball (girls)
  - 2004 Class 3A State Champions
- Swimming (boys and girls)
- Tennis (boys and girls)
- Track and Field (boys and girls)
  - Boys' 2-time State Champions (1968, 1992)
- Volleyball (girls)
- Wrestling

== See also ==
- List of school districts in Iowa
- List of high schools in Iowa
