= National Register of Historic Places listings in Clay County, Iowa =

Location of Clay County in Iowa

This is a list of the National Register of Historic Places listings in Clay County, Iowa.

This is intended to be a complete list of the properties and districts on the National Register of Historic Places in Clay County, Iowa, United States. Latitude and longitude coordinates are provided for many National Register properties and districts; these locations may be seen together in a map.

There are 9 properties and districts listed on the National Register in the county.

This National Park Service list is complete through NPS recent listings posted December 12, 2025.

== Current listings ==
	Name on the Register	Image	Date listed	Location	City or town	Description
1	Adams-Higgins House		September 27, 1984 (#84001214)	1215 N. Grand Ave. 43°09′01″N 95°08′45″W	Spencer	
2	Clay County Courthouse	Clay County Courthouse	July 2, 1981 (#81000229)	W. 4th St. and 3rd Ave., W. 43°08′31″N 95°08′54″W	Spencer	
3	Grand Avenue Historic Commercial District		December 6, 2004 (#04001322)	301-605 Grand Ave., 12-18, 21 W. 5th St., and 10, 13, and 15-19 W. 4th St. 43°08′35″N 95°08′41″W	Spencer	
4	Philip and Anna Parrish Kirchner Log House		September 2, 1993 (#93000897)	4969 120th Ave. 42°55′42″N 95°20′48″W	Peterson	
5	Little Sioux River Bridge		June 25, 1998 (#98000810)	210th Ave. over the Little Sioux River; 43°09′47″N 95°10′13″W	Spencer	
6	Logan Center School No.5	Logan Center School No.5	January 16, 2001 (#00001652)	Junction of 420th St. and 310th Ave. 43°02′22″N 94°58′24″W	Dickens	
7	North Grand Avenue Residential Historic District		May 19, 2014 (#14000212)	Roughly along N. Grand Ave. from 9th to 18th streets and between 1st Ave. W. and 1st Ave. E. 43°09′05″N 95°08′43″W	Spencer	
8	Spencer High School and Auditorium		February 12, 2010 (#10000002)	104 E. 4th St. 43°08′29″N 95°08′35″W	Spencer	
9	Wanata State Park Picnic Shelter		November 15, 1990 (#90001677)	South of the junction of County Road M27 and Iowa Highway 10; 42°54′39″N 95°20′17″W	Peterson	

=== Former listings ===
	Name on the Register	Image	Date listed	Date removed	Location	City or town	Description
1	Seymour Ross Round Barn		June 30, 1986 (#86001422)	November 15, 2006	Off Iowa Highway 374	Gillett Grove	Demolished in 2002

== See also ==
- List of National Historic Landmarks in Iowa
- National Register of Historic Places listings in Iowa
- Listings in neighboring counties: Buena Vista, Dickinson, O'Brien, Palo Alto
