= Gillett Grove Township, Clay County, Iowa =

Township in Iowa, US

Gillett Grove Township
- Township
- Location in Clay County
- Coordinates: 43°02′20″N 095°05′28″W
- Country: United States
- State: Iowa
- County: Clay

Area
  - Total: 36.12 sq mi (93.54 km^{2})
  - Land: 36.1 sq mi (93.5 km^{2})
  - Water: 0.015 sq mi (0.04 km^{2}) 0.04%
- Elevation: 1,348 ft (411 m)

Population (2000)
  - Total: 385
  - Density: 11/sq mi (4.1/km^{2})
- GNIS feature ID: 0467910

Gillett Grove Township is a township in Clay County, Iowa, USA. As of the 2000 census, its population was 385.

== History ==
Gillett Grove Township was created in 1873.

== Geography ==
Gillett Grove Township covers an area of 36.12 square miles (93.6 km^{2}) and contains two incorporated settlements: Gillett Grove and Greenville. According to the USGS, it contains one cemetery, Rosehill.

The streams of Elk Creek and Lexington Creek run through this township.
