= Clay High School =

Clay High School may refer to:

- Clay High School (Green Cove Springs, Florida)
- Clay High School (South Bend, Indiana)
- Clay High School (Oregon, Ohio)
- Clay High School (Portsmouth, Ohio)
- Clay Center High School (Kansas), Clay Center, Kansas
- Clay Center High School (Nebraska), Clay Center, Nebraska
- Clay City High School (Illinois), Clay City, Illinois
- Clay City Junior-Senior High School, Clay City, Indiana
- Clay County High School (Ashland, Alabama), Ashland, Alabama
- Clay County High School, Manchester, Kentucky
- Clay County High School (Clay, West Virginia), Clay, West Virginia

== See also ==
- Clay-Battelle High School, Blacksville, West Virginia
- Clay-Chalkville High School, Pinson, Alabama
- Clay Central-Everly High School, Everly, Iowa
- Henry Clay High School, Lexington, Kentucky
- Lynchburg-Clay High School, Lynchburg, Ohio
- North Clay Community High School, Louisville, Illinois
- Randolph Clay High School, Cuthbert, Georgia
