= Garfield Township, Clay County, Iowa =

Township in Iowa, US

Garfield Township
- Township
- Location in Clay County
- Coordinates: 42°56′46″N 094°59′00″W
- Country: United States
- State: Iowa
- County: Clay

Area
  - Total: 36.0 sq mi (93.2 km^{2})
  - Land: 35.96 sq mi (93.14 km^{2})
  - Water: 0.023 sq mi (0.06 km^{2}) 0.06%
- Elevation: 1,410 ft (430 m)

Population (2000)
  - Total: 311
  - Density: 8.5/sq mi (3.3/km^{2})
- GNIS feature ID: 0467891

Garfield Township is a township in Clay County, Iowa, United States. As of the 2000 census, its population was 311.

== Geography ==
Garfield Township covers an area of 35.98 square miles (93.2 km^{2}) and contains one incorporated settlement, Webb. According to the USGS, it contains one cemetery, Garfield Township.

Mud Lake is within this township.
