= Philip and Anna Parrish Kirchner Log House =

Historic house in Iowa, United States

- Philip and Anna Parrish Kirchner; Log House
- U.S. National Register of Historic Places
- Location within Iowa Location within the United States
- Location: 4969 120th Ave.
- Nearest city: Peterson, Iowa
- Coordinates: 42°55′42″N 95°20′48″W
- Built: 1867
- Built by: P. & A.P. Kirchner
- NRHP reference No.: 93000897
- Added to NRHP: September 2, 1993

The Philip and Anna Parrish Kirchner Log House is a historic building located north of Peterson, Iowa, United States. The Kirchners moved from the Albany, New York area to southwest Clay County in 1867, and built this log house the same year. It is located on part of the property that his older brother A.J. "Gust" Kirchner claimed in 1856. They were among the first Caucasian settlers in the county. A summer kitchen was later added to the west side of the house and a blacksmith shop onto the north side. The Kirchners lived here until they built a two-story frame house nearby in 1882. Philip's sister, Charlotte Kirchner Butler, bought the property after his death and restored the log house to its original condition around 1910, which meant the removal of the summer kitchen and the blacksmith shop. The property remained in the family until at least the 1990s, and housed a display of family artifacts. The house was listed on the National Register of Historic Places in 1993.
