= Betty Baxter Anderson =

American author (1908–1966)

- Born: March 10, 1908 Cornell, Iowa
- Died: June 17, 1966 (aged 58) Escondido, California

Betty Baxter Anderson (March 10, 1908 – June 17, 1966) was an American writer.

== Career ==
In the late 1930s Anderson wrote Talking About Books, a series of articles for the Iowa City Press-Citizen newspaper. She was the author of 20 books for teenage girls, most of which were part of her career series. Her books were unusual for the time because she put the lead female characters in traditionally male roles.

== Bibliography ==
(Under the name Alice Anson)

- "The Dormitory Mystery" (1937)
- "Escape By Night" (1941)

(Under the name Betty Baxter)

- "Becky Brian's Secret" (1937)
- "Daughter of the Coast Guard," (1938)
- "The Unseen Enemy." (1938)

(Under the name Claudia Canyon)

- "Junior League Murders" (1954)

(Under the name Betty Baxter Anderson)

- "Adventures in 4-H" (1938)
- "Peggy Wayne, sky girl; A Career Story for Older Girls," (1941)
- "Connie Benton, reporter; A Career Story for Older Girls," (1941)
- "Nancy Blake Copywriter; A Career Story for Older Girls," (1942)
- "Ann Porter Nurse; A Career Story for Older Girls" (1942)
- "Julia Brent of the WAAC; A Career Story for Older Children" (1943)
- "Four Girls and a Radio; A Career Story for Older Girls" (1944)
- "Holly Saunders Designer; A Career Story for Older Girls" (1947)
- "Secret of the old books" (1952)
- "Curtain call for Connie" (1953)
- "Alabama Raider" (1957)
- "One hour to victory" (1960)
- "Powder monkey" (1962)

== Education ==
A graduate of Iowa City High School and the University of Iowa, she also attained a Master of Arts from the San Diego College for Women, where she also taught creative writing.

== Early life and family ==
Betty Baxter was the daughter of Phillip H and Anna Margaret (Bailey) Baxter. She married Dr. Ernest William Anderson on May 18, 1931 and had two children, Anthony Baxter and Kay C. Baxter.
