= Freeman Township =

·Freeman Township may refer to the following places in the United States:

- Freeman Township, Pope County, Arkansas
- Freeman Township, Woodruff County, Arkansas, Woodruff County, Arkansas
- Freeman Township, Clay County, Iowa
- Freeman Township, Michigan
- Freeman Township, Freeborn County, Minnesota
- Freeman Township, Richland County, North Dakota, Richland County, North Dakota
