= Cornell, Iowa =

- Unincorporated community
- Location within Iowa
- Coordinates: 42°56′40″N 95°08′24″W
- Country: United States
- State: Iowa
- County: Clay
- Elevation: 1,394 ft (425 m)
- Time zone: UTC-6 (Central (CST))
  - Summer (DST): UTC-5 (CDT)
- Area code: 712
- GNIS feature ID: 455632

Cornell is an unincorporated community in Herdland Township, Clay County, Iowa, United States. Cornell is located near U.S. Route 71 and is 3.6 miles (5.8 km) north of Sioux Rapids.

== History ==
Cornell's population was 12 in 1925. The population was 21 in 1940. Cornell's post office operated from 1902 to 1967.
