= Summit Township, Clay County, Iowa =

Township in Iowa, US

Summit Township
- Township
- Location in Clay County
- Coordinates: 43°12′41″N 095°12′48″W
- Country: United States
- State: Iowa
- County: Clay

Area
  - Total: 35.30 sq mi (91.43 km^{2})
  - Land: 35.30 sq mi (91.43 km^{2})
  - Water: 0 sq mi (0 km^{2}) 0%
- Elevation: 1,358 ft (414 m)

Population (2000)
  - Total: 452
  - Density: 13/sq mi (4.9/km^{2})
- GNIS feature ID: 0468761

Summit Township is a township in Clay County, Iowa, USA. As of the 2000 census, its population was 452. Spencer Municipal Airport is located in the township.

== History ==
Summit Township was created in 1872.

== Geography ==
Summit Township covers an area of 35.3 square miles (91 km^{2}) and contains one incorporated settlement, Fostoria. According to the USGS, it contains one cemetery, Evergreen.

== Economy ==
At one point Great Lakes Airlines was headquartered in the township.
