= Wattie Holm =

American baseball player (1901–1950)

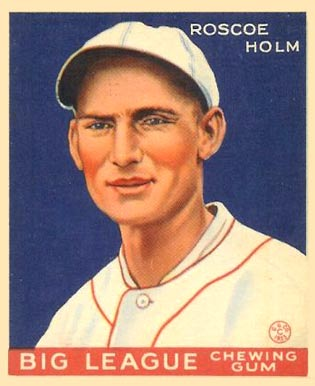
- Outfielder
- Born: December 28, 1901; Peterson, Iowa, U.S.
- Died: May 19, 1950 (aged 48); Everly, Iowa, U.S.
- Batted: Right Threw: Right

MLB debut
- April 15, 1924, for the St. Louis Cardinals

Last MLB appearance
- August 8, 1932, for the St. Louis Cardinals

MLB statistics
- Batting average: .275
- Home runs: 6
- Runs batted in: 174
- Stats at Baseball Reference

Teams
- St. Louis Cardinals (1924–1929, 1932)

Roscoe Albert Holm (December 28, 1901 – May 19, 1950) was an American Major League Baseball player. Holm played for the St. Louis Cardinals for seven seasons between 1924 and 1932, missing the 1930 and 1931 seasons. Holm was a member of the Cardinals first World Series in 1926. He batted and threw right-handed. Holm suffered from mental illness later in life. Nearly two decades after leaving professional baseball, he murdered his wife shortly before killing himself.

== Early life ==
Holm was born in Peterson, Iowa, and as a child he moved with his family to Alton, Iowa. Holm received his nickname, "Wattie", when he was young. Holm's father encouraged him to pursue dental school. attended the University of Iowa for a year before leaving to pursue a baseball career.

Holm married the former Ella Powell in Spencer, Iowa, in 1923. She was a schoolteacher. They had a son named Robert and a daughter named Margaret.

== Career ==
Holm made his major league debut with the St. Louis Cardinals in 1924, after playing minor league baseball at Syracuse the season before. He spent much of his career back and forth between the major leagues and the minor leagues, but he stayed in the major leagues between 1926 and 1929. His best season came in 1927, when Holm had a .286 batting average and drove in 66 runs while playing 110 games for St. Louis.

In the fall of 1929, the Cardinals advised Holm to have surgery on his tonsils and nose. He refused at the time, but underwent the procedure in the spring of 1930, causing a delay in his preparation for the 1930 season. He played for the Houston Buffaloes in 1930 and the Rochester Red Wings in 1931.

Holm split 1932, his last year in professional baseball, between the Cardinals, the Red Wings and the Columbus Red Birds.

In 436 games over seven seasons, Holm recorded a .275 batting average (410-for-1493) with 207 runs, 6 home runs and 174 RBI. He posted a career .955 fielding percentage. In two World Series (1926 and 1928), he hit .136 (3-for-22) with 2 RBI.

== Later life ==
In the early 1940s, Holm was running a gas station in Storm Lake, Iowa, and managing a semipro baseball team, the Storm Lake White Caps. In 1942, he trained as a machinist to support the defense effort in World War II. Later, he lived in Lake View, Iowa, and ran a factory that manufactured baseball bats.

Holm was turned down for a managing job with a local baseball team in early 1950 because of concerns about his mental health. He had been depressed since suffering a series of business failures. Holm also had a family history of mental illness, as his brother Marcel had committed suicide.

In mid-May 1950, Holm quit his job at a sporting goods store in Spencer, Iowa. On May 19, at his home in Everly, Iowa, Holm fatally shot Ella, seriously wounded Margaret, and killed himself with a gunshot to the head. Robert was working in another city when the shooting occurred.

Fred Sindt, who owned the home where the family lived, said that he had a calm conversation with Holm minutes before the shooting. He said that the family was getting ready to move to Linn Grove, Iowa, the next week.

After Margaret recovered from her injuries, she lived with the family of Holm's former teammate Billy Southworth.
