= Merlyn Hans Dethlefsen =

US Air Force officer and recipient of the Medal of Honor

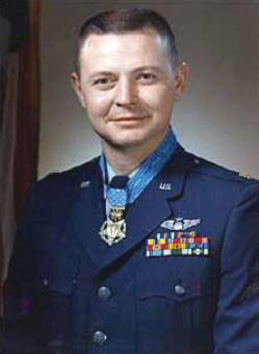
- Colonel Merlyn Dethlefsen
- Born: June 29, 1934; Greenville, Iowa, US
- Died: December 14, 1987 (aged 53); Tarrant County, Texas, US
- Burial place: Arlington National Cemetery
- Military career
- Allegiance: United States
- Branch: United States Air Force
- Service years: 1954–1977
- Rank: Colonel
- Unit: 354th Tactical Fighter Squadron
- Commands: 96th Bombardment Wing
- Conflicts: Vietnam War
- Awards: Medal of Honor; Distinguished Flying Cross; Meritorious Service Medal (2); Air Medal (10)

Merlyn Hans Dethlefsen (June 29, 1934 – December 14, 1987) was a United States Air Force officer and a recipient of the United States military's highest decoration—the Medal of Honor—for his actions in the Vietnam War.

== Early life ==
Dethlefsen was born June 1934 in Greenville, Iowa. After attending Iowa State University for two years, he joined the Air Force from Royal, Iowa, in 1954, and was commissioned through the aviation cadet program in 1955.

== Military career ==
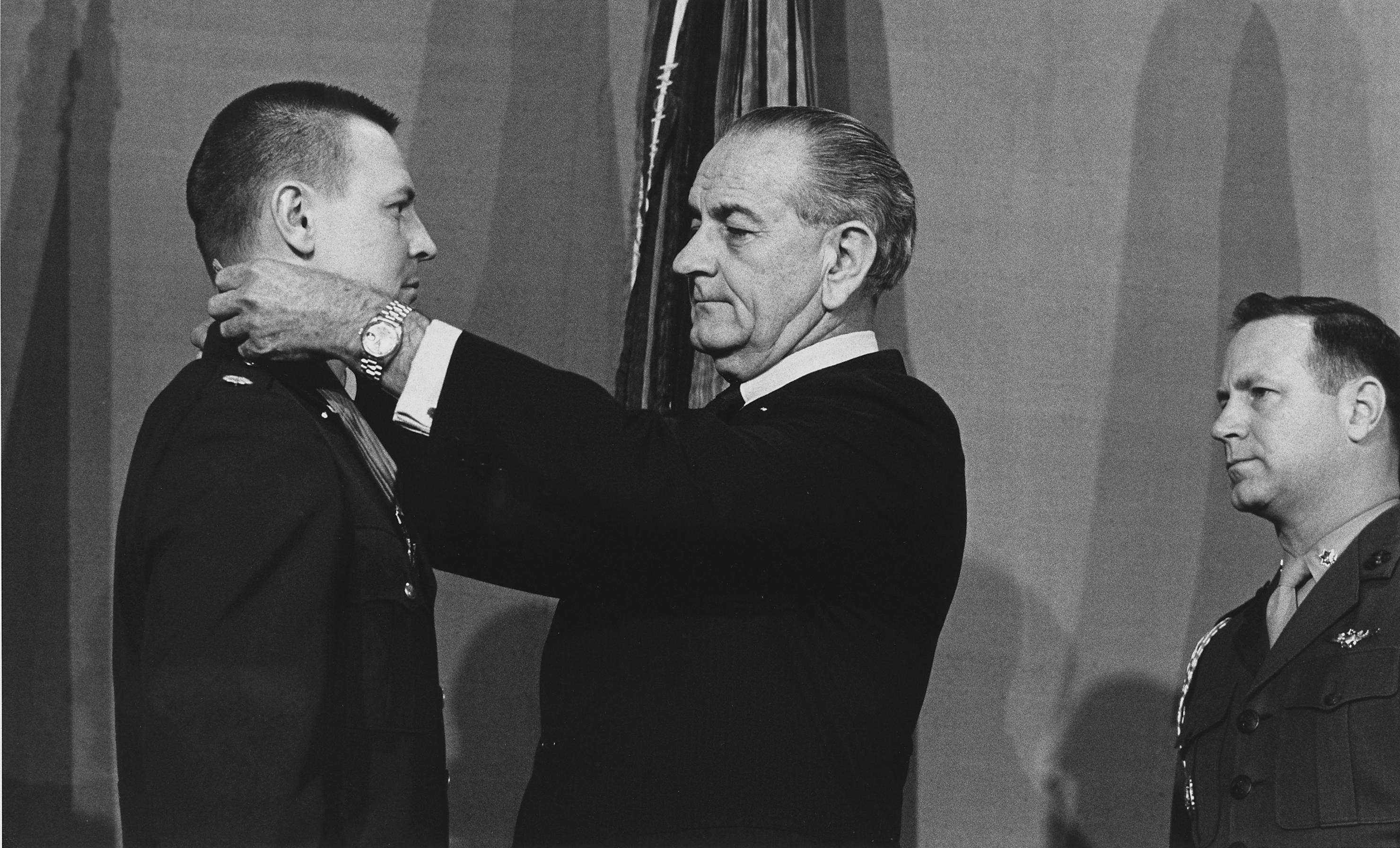
Dethlefsen receives the Medal of Honor from President Johnson

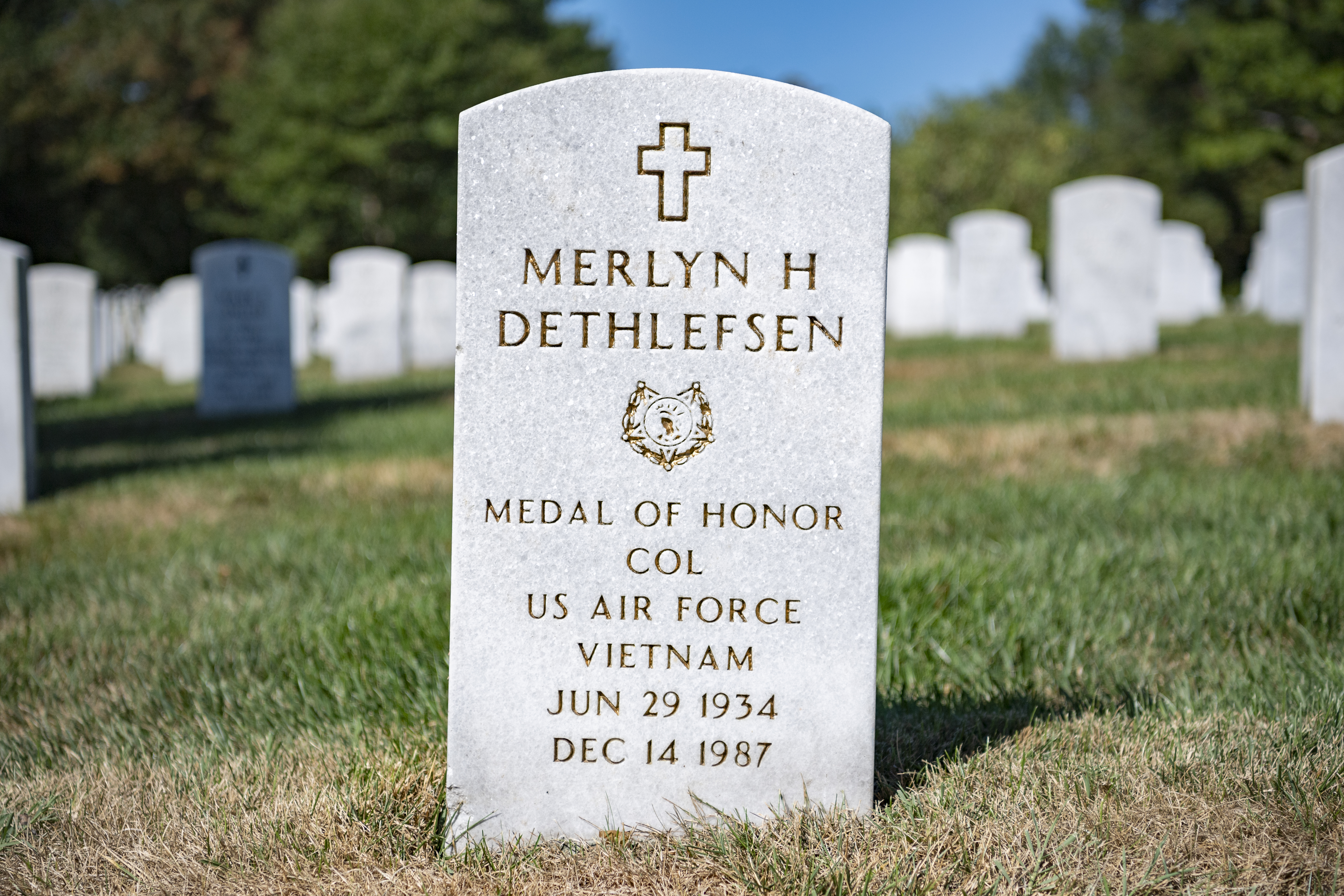
Grave at Arlington National Cemetery

Between February 1957 and 1959, Dethlefsen served at Dover Air Force Base as a Navigator on the C-124 Globemaster. He then began his pilot training at Bainbridge Air Force Base. From 1961 to 1965, he flew F-100 Super Sabres with the 9th Tactical Fighter Squadron at Spangdahlem Air Base, then moved to the 560th Tactical Fighter Squadron at McConnell Air Force Base until deploying to Southeast Asia in October 1966.

In 1965, he earned his college degree from University of Nebraska at Omaha, with a major in business.

=== Vietnam and Medal of Honor Mission ===
In 1966, he began flying F-105 Thunderchief fighters with the 333rd Tactical Fighter Squadron and then the 354th Tactical Fighter Squadron of 335th Tactical Fighter Wing at Takhli Royal Thai Air Force Base at Thailand, from October 1966 to June 1967. By March 10, 1967, had risen to the rank of captain.

On March 10, 1967, Dethlefsen along with his EWO Kevin Gilroy, flying the number three aircraft, and three other F-105s of Lincoln flight, flew ahead of a strike force of 72 fighter-bombers (F-105 Thunderchiefs from Korat and Takhli, and F-4 Phantoms from Ubon) heading to the Thai Nguyen iron and steel works.

Their job was to attack the surface-to-air missile complex, antiaircraft guns and a ring of automatic weapons guarding the target. On the first pass, his flight leader (F-105F 63–8335, piloted by David Everson and Jose Luna, both POW) was shot down by 85mm AAA fire and his wingman was forced to withdraw with severe damage. Dethlefsen then took command of the flight while fending off MiG attacks and responding to his own battle-damaged aircraft. As he maneuvered, he evaded an intercepting Mikoyan-Gurevich MiG-21 by flying into heavy enemy antiaircraft fire. His F-105 was severely damaged, but he determined the aircraft could still fly.

Despite his nearly crippled plane, Dethlefsen made repeated strikes with his wingman, Kenneth Bell, against the enemy's defensive positions. Evading a second MiG, Dethlefsen dove through the obscuring haze to locate the missile complex when he was again hit by flak. Making a final dive bombing attack and a strafing run with 20 mm cannon fires, Dethlefsen effectively destroyed two missile sites before finally leaving for Takhli, 500 miles away. The mission was considered a success although two F-4s of the strike force were shot down.

Dethlefsen could have pulled out of the mission on a number of occasions: when attacked by MiGs, when he and his wingman were hit by flak, or when the smoke of battle made it difficult to locate the enemy. But he decided to make repeated passes, each one more dangerous than the one before. For his actions, Dethlefsen was awarded the Medal of Honor by President Lyndon B. Johnson on February 1, 1968. He became the third of 12 airmen so honored during the Vietnam War.

=== Post War ===
Dethlefsen served as an instructor pilot with the 3575th Pilot Training Squadron and 3576th Student Squadron at Vance Air Force Base after his return from Vietnam until 1971.

Dethlefsen graduated from Air War College at Maxwell Air Force Base in June 1972. Dethlefsen was then assistant director of operations for the SR-71 Blackbird wing at Beale Air Force Base and director of operations for the B-52 Stratofortress wing at Dyess Air Force Base.

He retired from the Air Force in 1977 with the rank of colonel. Dethlefsen died at age 53 of natural causes on December 14, 1987, and was subsequently buried in Section 65 of Arlington National Cemetery.

== Awards and decorations ==
Dethlefsen's decorations include:

US Air Force Command Pilot Badge
Medal of Honor	Distinguished Flying Cross	Meritorious Service Medal with bronze oak leaf cluster
Air Medal with one silver and three bronze oak leaf clusters	Air Medal (second ribbon required for accouterment spacing)	Air Force Commendation Medal
Presidential Unit Citation	Air Force Outstanding Unit Award with four bronze oak leaf clusters	Air Force Reserve Good Conduct Medal
Combat Readiness Medal	National Defense Service Medal with bronze service star	Armed Forces Expeditionary Medal
Vietnam Service Medal with three bronze campaign stars	Air Force Longevity Service Award with four bronze oak leaf clusters	Armed Forces Reserve Medal
Small Arms Expert Marksmanship Ribbon	Republic of Vietnam Gallantry Cross	Vietnam Campaign Medal

=== Medal of Honor citation ===
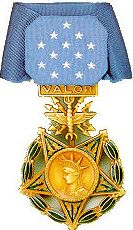
Air Force version of the Medal of Honor

Maj. Dethlefsen was 1 of a flight of F-105 aircraft engaged in a fire suppression mission designed to destroy a key antiaircraft defensive complex containing surface-to-air missiles (SAM), an exceptionally heavy concentration of antiaircraft artillery, and other automatic weapons. The defensive network was situated to dominate the approach and provide protection to an important North Vietnamese industrial center that was scheduled to be attacked by fighter bombers immediately after the strike by Maj. Dethlefsen's flight. In the initial attack on the defensive complex the lead aircraft was crippled, and Maj. Dethlefsen's aircraft was extensively damaged by the intense enemy fire. Realizing that the success of the impending fighter bomber attack on the center now depended on his ability to effectively suppress the defensive fire, Maj. Dethlefsen ignored the enemy's overwhelming firepower and the damage to his aircraft and pressed his attack. Despite a continuing hail of antiaircraft fire, deadly surface-to-air missiles, and counterattacks by MIG interceptors, Maj. Dethlefsen flew repeated close range strikes to silence the enemy defensive positions with bombs and cannon fire. His action in rendering ineffective the defensive SAM and antiaircraft artillery sites enabled the ensuing fighter bombers to strike successfully the important industrial target without loss or damage to their aircraft, thereby appreciably reducing the enemy's ability to provide essential war material. Maj. Dethlefsen's consummate skill and selfless dedication to this significant mission were in keeping with the highest traditions of the U.S. Air Force and reflect great credit upon himself and the Armed Forces of his country.

=== In popular culture ===
- In episode 298 of The Simpsons, "Special Edna", Bart Simpson's classmate Nelson Muntz makes a subtle reference to Dethlefsen's service in the Vietnam War:

Edna Krabappel: "The topic for your research paper is World War I."

Bart: "Was that the one with Hitler, or the one with Merlin?"

Nelson: "You idiot! Merlyn was in Vietnam!"

== See also ==
- List of Medal of Honor recipients
- List of Medal of Honor recipients for the Vietnam War
