= Lincoln Township, Clay County, Iowa =

Township in Iowa, US

Lincoln Township
- Township
- Location in Clay County
- Coordinates: 43°02′13″N 095°13′14″W
- Country: United States
- State: Iowa
- County: Clay

Area
  - Total: 36.3 sq mi (93.9 km^{2})
  - Land: 36.3 sq mi (93.9 km^{2})
  - Water: 0 sq mi (0 km^{2}) 0%
- Elevation: 1,404 ft (428 m)

Population (2000)
  - Total: 260
  - Density: 7.3/sq mi (2.8/km^{2})
- GNIS feature ID: 0468246

Lincoln Township is a township in Clay County, Iowa, USA. As of the 2000 census, its population was 260.

== History ==
Lincoln Township was created in 1867.

== Geography ==
Lincoln Township covers an area of 36.26 square miles (93.9 km^{2}) and contains one incorporated settlement, Rossie. According to the USGS, it contains three cemeteries: Bethlehem Lutheran, Lincoln and Prairie Creek.
