= Clay Central–Everly Community School District =

School district in Iowa, United States

Coordinates: 43.062272°N 95.286147°W

Location
- Royal, Iowa Clay, Dickinson and O'Brien counties United States
- Coordinates: 43.062272, -95.286147

District information
- Type: Local school district
- Grades: K–6
- Superintendent: Scott Williamson
- Schools: 1
- Budget: $4,285,000 (2020-21)
- NCES District ID: 1907470

Students and staff
- Students: 72 (2022-23)
- Teachers: 10.01 FTE
- Staff: 20.20 FTE
- Student–teacher ratio: 7.19
- District mascot: Mavericks
- Colors: Red and yellow

Other information
- Website: www.claycentraleverly.org

Clay Central–Everly Community School District (CCE) is a rural public school district headquartered in Royal, Iowa, United States. The district is mostly in Clay County, with portions in Dickinson and O'Brien counties. It serves Royal, Everly, Greenville, and Rossie.

== History ==
The district was formed on July 1, 1993, by the merger of the Clay Central School District and the Everly School District.

On July 1, 2010, the South Clay Community School District was dissolved, and portions went to the Clay Central–Everly district.

On March 12, 2019, the school board decided to tuition out the middle/high school. The students had a choice of four schools: Okoboji, Sioux Central, Spencer, and Hartley–Melvin–Sanborn. The last school day was June 3, 2019.
