= Lone Tree Township, Clay County, Iowa =

Township in Iowa, US

Lone Tree Township
- Township
- Location in Clay County
- Coordinates: 43°07′37″N 095°19′41″W
- Country: United States
- State: Iowa
- County: Clay

Area
  - Total: 35.35 sq mi (91.55 km^{2})
  - Land: 35.34 sq mi (91.52 km^{2})
  - Water: 0.012 sq mi (0.03 km^{2}) 0.03%
- Elevation: 1,398 ft (426 m)

Population (2000)
  - Total: 860
  - Density: 24/sq mi (9.4/km^{2})
- GNIS feature ID: 0468302

Lone Tree Township is a township in Clay County, Iowa, USA. As of the 2000 census, its population was 860.

== History ==
Lone Tree Township was created in 1877. Lone Tree Township takes its name from a large elm tree that was a local landmark on the prairie.

== Geography ==
Lone Tree Township covers an area of 35.35 square miles (91.6 km^{2}) and contains one incorporated settlement, Everly. According to the USGS, it contains one cemetery, Lone Tree.

The stream of Sewer Creek runs through this township.
