= Meadow Township, Clay County, Iowa =

Township in Iowa, US

Meadow Township
- Township
- Location in Clay County
- Coordinates: 43°12′53″N 095°05′23″W
- Country: United States
- State: Iowa
- County: Clay

Area
  - Total: 34.84 sq mi (90.23 km^{2})
  - Land: 34.80 sq mi (90.13 km^{2})
  - Water: 0.039 sq mi (0.1 km^{2}) 0.11%
- Elevation: 1,362 ft (415 m)

Population (2000)
  - Total: 339
  - Density: 9.8/sq mi (3.8/km^{2})
- GNIS feature ID: 0468370

Meadow Township is a township in Clay County, Iowa, USA. As of the 2000 census, its population was 339.

== History ==
Meadow Township was created in 1882.

== Geography ==
Meadow Township covers an area of 34.84 square miles (90.2 km^{2}) and contains no incorporated settlements, although the unincorporated community of Langdon is located here. According to the USGS, it contains one cemetery, Fairview.

The stream of Little Meadow Creek runs through this township.
