= Lake Township, Clay County, Iowa =

Township in Iowa, US

Lake Township
- Township
- Location in Clay County
- Coordinates: 43°12′19″N 094°58′36″W
- Country: United States
- State: Iowa
- County: Clay

Area
  - Total: 35.95 sq mi (93.12 km^{2})
  - Land: 33.36 sq mi (86.41 km^{2})
  - Water: 2.59 sq mi (6.71 km^{2}) 7.21%
- Elevation: 1,352 ft (412 m)

Population (2000)
  - Total: 240
  - Density: 7.3/sq mi (2.8/km^{2})
- GNIS feature ID: 0468179

Lake Township is a township in Clay County, Iowa, USA. As of the 2000 census, its population was 240.

== History ==
Lake Township was created in 1882. It is named from the large number of lakes within its borders.

== Geography ==
Lake Township covers an area of 35.95 square miles (93.1 km^{2}) and contains no incorporated settlements.

Dan Green Slough, Mud Lake, Round Lake and Trumbull Lake are within this township.
