= Clay County Courthouse (Iowa) =

- U.S. National Register of Historic Places
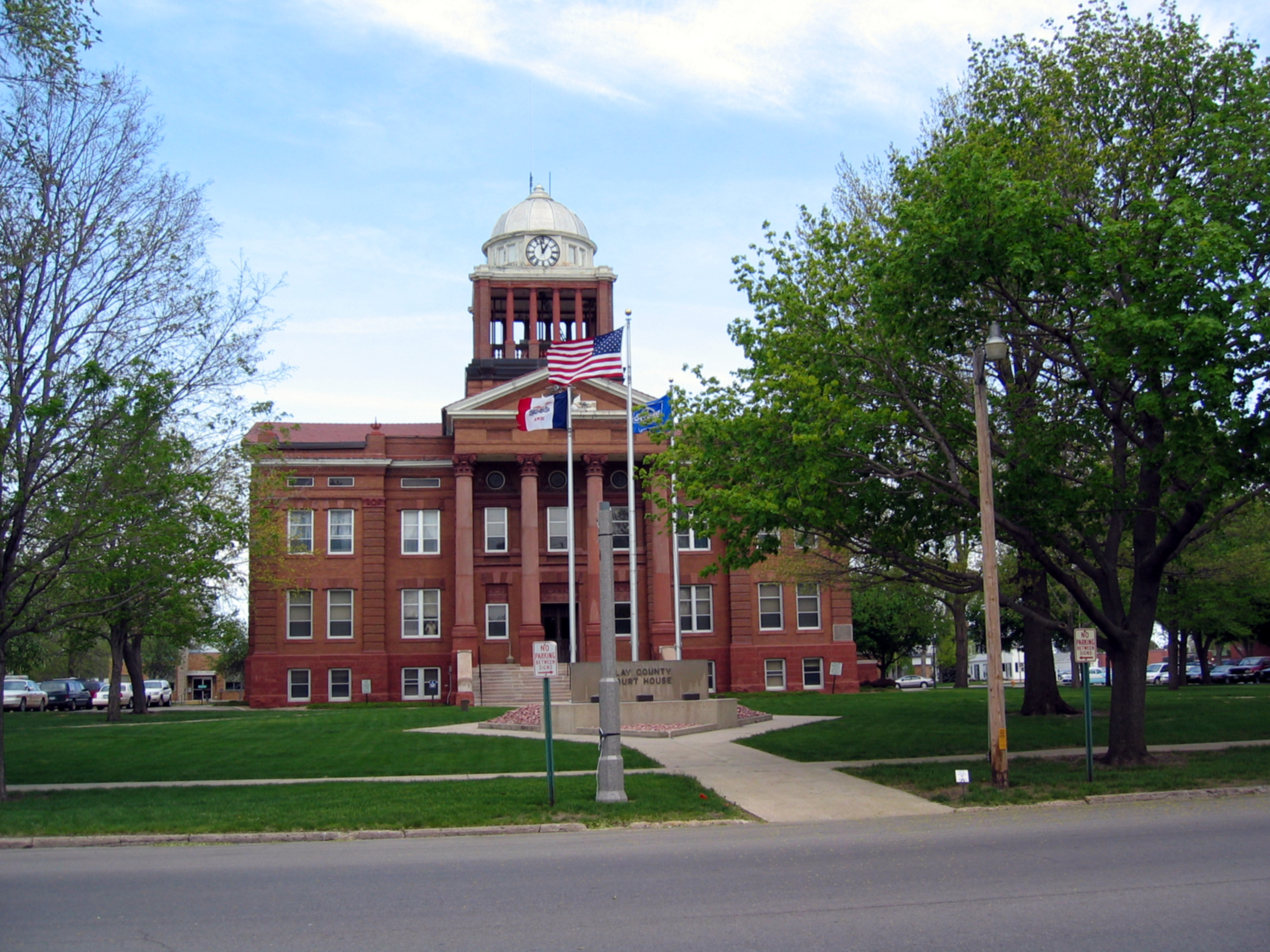
- The Clay County courthouse in downtown Spencer

- Location within Iowa Location within the United States
- Interactive map showing the location of Clay County Courthouse
- Location: 4th St. and 3rd Ave. Spencer, Iowa
- Coordinates: 43°08′30.5″N 95°8′53.6″W
- Area: less than one acre
- Built: 1901
- Architectural style: Classical Revival
- MPS: County Courthouses in Iowa TR
- NRHP reference No.: 81000229
- Added to NRHP: July 2, 1981

The Clay County Courthouse, located in Spencer, Iowa, United States, was built in 1901. It was listed on the National Register of Historic Places in 1981 as a part of the County Courthouses in Iowa Thematic Resource. The courthouse is the fourth building the county has used for court functions and county administration.

== History ==
A commission chose Spencer Township as Clay County's first county seat. Voters chose to have the small town of Peterson be the county seat instead and allocated $6,000 for a courthouse. When the contractor submitted a bill for $7,500 he received $6,900. By 1871, the population in the northern part of the county was growing rapidly and the county seat moved to the new city of Spencer. A stock company was formed to build a new courthouse that was sold to the county for $1,333. County offices gradually outgrew the structure and they constructed a new two-story brick courthouse for $4,435. The old courthouse was used for a barn, a cement block factory, and then remodeled into two houses. County citizens eventually grew tired of their plain courthouse and plans were made to replace it. Construction of the present facility began in 1900 and it was completed a year later $60,000. The red stone Neoclassical building features a cupola with a bronze covered dome and a clock. Its significance is derived from its association with county government, and the political power and prestige of Spencer as the county seat.
