= Sioux Township, Clay County, Iowa =

Township in Iowa, US

Sioux Township
- Township
- Location in Clay County
- Coordinates: 43°07′49″N 095°04′45″W
- Country: United States
- State: Iowa
- County: Clay

Area
  - Total: 30.45 sq mi (78.87 km^{2})
  - Land: 30.42 sq mi (78.78 km^{2})
  - Water: 0.035 sq mi (0.09 km^{2}) 0.11%
- Elevation: 1,296 ft (395 m)

Population (2000)
  - Total: 395
  - Density: 13/sq mi (5/km^{2})
- GNIS feature ID: 0468715

Sioux Township is a township in Clay County, Iowa, USA. As of the 2000 census, its population was 395.

== History ==
Sioux Township was created in 1894.

== Geography ==
Sioux Township covers an area of 30.45 square miles (78.9 km^{2}) and contains no incorporated settlements.

The streams of Big Muddy Creek, Little Muddy Creek, Lost Island Outlet and Prairie Creek run through this township.
