= Spencer Community School District =

Public school district in Spencer, Iowa, United States

Coordinates: 41.662855°N 92.018800°W

Location
- Spencer, Iowa Iowa County United States
- Coordinates: 41.662855, -92.018800

District information
- Type: Local school district
- Grades: K-12
- Superintendent: Terry Hemann
- Schools: 5
- Budget: $32,213,000 (2020-21)
- NCES District ID: 1926910

Students and staff
- Students: 2341 (2022-2023)
- Teachers: 150.22 FTE
- Staff: 191.21 FTE
- Student–teacher ratio: 15.58
- Athletic conference: Siouxland Conference
- District mascot: Tigers
- Colors: Purple and Gold

Other information
- Website: www.spencerschools.org

Spencer Community School District is a public school district headquartered in Spencer, Iowa.

The district, entirely in Clay County, serves Spencer, Dickens, Gillett Grove, and a small part of Fostoria.

On July 1, 2010, the South Clay Community School District dissolved, with a portion going to the Spencer district.

== Schools ==
- Spencer High School(9th-12th)
- Spencer Middle School(6th-8th)
- Lincoln Elementary(3rd-5th)
- Fairveiw Elementary(1st-2nd)
- Johnson Elementary (Preschool, KinderKids, & Kindergarten)
- It formerly operated Jefferson Elementary School.

The school's mascot is the Tigers. Their colors are purple and gold.

=== Spencer High School ===
==== Extracurricular activities ====
FFA

Band (Concert Band, Pep Band, and Marching Band)

Choir

Drama

Speech

Debate

Mock Trial

==== Athletics ====
The Tigers compete in the Siouxland Conference in the following sports:

- Baseball
  - 2-time Class 3A State Champions (1990, 1997)
- Basketball (boys and girls)
- Cross Country (boys and girls)
  - Girls' - 1978 Class 3A State Champions
- Football
  - 1994 Class 3A State Champions
- Golf (boys and girls)
- Soccer (boys and girls)
  - Boys' - 2009 Class 2A State Champions
- Softball (girls)
- Swimming (boys and girls)
- Tennis (boys and girls)
- Track and Field (boys and girls)
  - Boys' 3-time Class 3A State Champions (1987, 1988, 2002)
- Volleyball (girls)
- Wrestling

== See also ==
- List of school districts in Iowa
- List of high schools in Iowa
