= South Clay Community School District =

Defunct school district in Iowa, US

South Clay Community School District was a school district headquartered in Gillett Grove, Iowa. In addition to Gillett Grove, it served Dickens and Webb.

== History ==
The district was established in 1964.

By 1993, the population had declined so much, to 325, that the district decided to close its junior and senior high school divisions and send students to other school districts: Laurens–Marathon, Ruthven-Ayrshire, Sioux Central, and Spencer. Within the same year, as whole-grade sharing was in place, the student population was down to 232. After the closure of the high school, according to superintendent David Schulz, the community perceived the district to be doomed and speculated on how long the South Clay district would survive. According to Schulz, administrators were, at the time, operating on the presumption that the district would close circa 1996 to 1998.

After 1993 the area population further declined, and increasing numbers of elementary students transferred to other schools. In 2010, the district had 132 students; there were seven preschool students, no kindergarten students, and no 4th-grade students. At the same time there were 97 students living in the district boundaries attending secondary school in other districts. There were also 18 employees, both full-time and part-time. At that time the district leadership decided to suggest dissolution of the district. On February 2, 2010, the residents voted to dissolve the school district. Schulz had stated that since taxpayers had requested the vote, he expected it to be approved by voters, but even if it had not been, the state would have involuntarily dissolved the school district anyway, with the local education agency (LEA) placing students in new schools.

On July 1, 2010, the district was dissolved. Portions went to the Clay Central–Everly, Laurens–Marathon, Ruthven-Ayrshire, Sioux Central, and Spencer school districts; the respective assessed valuation of the former South Clay territory given to each district were: less than 1%, 3.2%, less than 1%, 45.5%, and 50%. It was the fifth school district in the state to dissolve (instead of merge into another district) since 1965, when the Iowa Department of Education began keeping records of school district dissolutions and consolidations. In mid-March 2011, the main building of the school was razed. Webb and the areas south of Gillett Grove were reassigned to Sioux Central.
