= Logan Center School No.5 =

- U.S. National Register of Historic Places
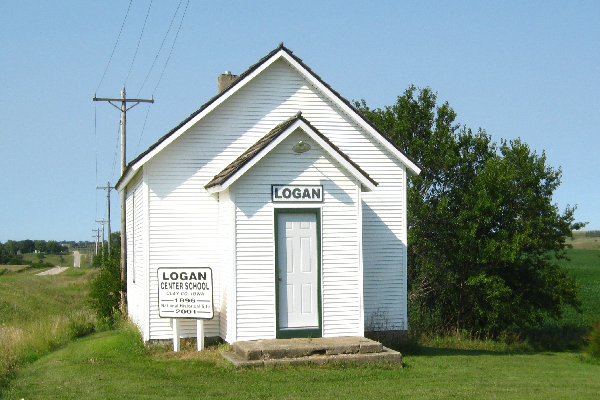

- Location within Iowa Location within the United States
- Location: Junction of 420th St. and 310th Ave.
- Nearest city: Dickens, Iowa
- Coordinates: 43°02′22.3″N 94°58′24.2″W
- Area: less than one acre
- Built: 1895
- NRHP reference No.: 00001652
- Added to NRHP: January 16, 2001

Logan Center School No.5 is a historic one-room schoolhouse located south of Dickens, Iowa, United States. The property was purchased for $20 in 1894, and the schoolhouse was built the following year. Enrollment here averaged between 25 and 30 students until the 1930s when it started to decline. The school was closed in 1941 when it was incorporated into the Gillett Grove Consolidated School. The building is located in the center of Logan Township. Because the township has no incorporated communities, the school building has functioned as a township hall, a polling place, and a venue for other community events. The building was also used for worship services and religious instruction. The original privy remains in the back, but a woodshed that was part of the historical nomination has subsequently been removed. The schoolhouse and privy were listed together on the National Register of Historic Places in 2001.
