= Peterson Patriot =

Newspaper in Peterson, Iowa

The Peterson Patriot
- Type: Weekly newspaper
- Owner(s): Richard and Mari Radtke
- Founded: 1880
- Headquarters: Paullina, Iowa
- Circulation: 550

The Peterson Patriot is a weekly newspaper based in Peterson, Iowa. It was founded in 1880.

== History ==
The paper began in 1880 as the Peterson Dispatch and was edited by Ray Gleason. It was known as a Republican newspaper, but it soon closed. Shortly after, it came under the new ownership of E.J. Helms and his partner, E.G. Blackert, and was renamed the Peterson Patriot. This version of the paper was originally non-partisan, but eventually became Republican. Ownership of the Patriot, a successful newspaper by that time, changed hands every few years until 1966, when Harold Grafton and Shirley Omer became the new owners. Marge Ashcraft became the Managing Editor, gathering news and advertising, while her husband Roy would take the information to Primghar, Iowa to be set up, and then to Sibley, Iowa for printing. The paper changed hands once more in 1989 and was owned by Roger and Jane Stoner of Peterson, Iowa.

In the early days, difficulties of the paper included getting supplies and materials to Peterson. The rivers were always high and it was hard to get the materials delivered. A train was not yet set-up to come through the area. The Patriot office moved to a few different locations in Peterson, back and forth across main street.

Some featured articles included the following: “In and About by Jarney”, an editorial column, Roger's Remarks, a humor column, the local news and happenings, social events/gatherings of the community, local sports, classifieds, and articles on the women's suffrage movement.

== The Paper today ==
Today, the paper is owned by Richard and Mari Radtke of Sutherland, Iowa. It serves the Peterson area, but is published and printed weekly in Paullina, Iowa. It covers the Sioux Central School District news (the local community school), referred to as a section called, “The Rebel Yell” in the paper. It has a “Remember When” section, which lists interesting history from Peterson from 10, 20, 55, and 60 years ago. Marriages, births, and obituaries are also common items published today. Clay County Board of Supervisors minutes, City of Peterson Meeting minutes and Sioux Central Board of Education minutes are all legal proceedings published for the public to view. On the back page of the paper is a list of business directories that help fund the small town newspaper.
