= Arlo L. Olson =

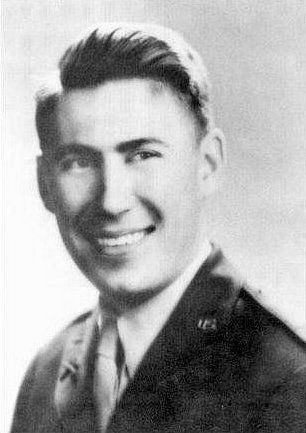
- Olson c. 1942
- Born: April 20, 1918; Greenville, Iowa, US
- Died: October 28, 1943 (aged 25); Monte San Nicola, Lazio, Italy
- Burial place: Fort Snelling National Cemetery, Minneapolis, Minnesota
- Military career
- Allegiance: United States of America
- Branch: United States Army
- Service years: 1941 – 1943
- Rank: Captain
- Units: 15th Infantry Regiment, 3rd Infantry Division
- Conflicts: World War II: Italian Campaign †
- Awards: Medal of Honor; Purple Heart

Arlo L. Olson (April 20, 1918 – October 28, 1943) was a United States Army officer and a recipient of the United States military's highest decoration—the Medal of Honor—for his actions in World War II.

== Biography ==
Olson was born in Iowa, and his family moved to South Dakota when he was ten. He attended school in Toronto, South Dakota. He became an Eagle Scout, and is one of nine Eagle Scouts who have been awarded the Medal of Honor. Olson attended the University of South Dakota from 1936 to 1940 where he became a member of the Sigma Alpha Epsilon fraternity, and was commissioned through Army ROTC and following graduation. By October 13, 1943, was serving as a captain in the 15th Infantry Regiment, 3rd Infantry Division. On that day and the following two weeks, he showed conspicuous leadership during the push across the Volturno River in Italy. Olson repeatedly led his men in attacks against German forces, personally capturing several enemy positions, until he was mortally wounded during a reconnaissance patrol. He was posthumously awarded the Medal of Honor ten months later, on August 31, 1944.

Olson, aged 25 at his death, was buried in Fort Snelling National Cemetery, Minneapolis, Minnesota.

His wife, Myra (Boudreaux) Olson and daughter, Myra (Sandra) Laverne Olson survived him, but are both now deceased; some of Olson's living relatives include his granddaughter, Katrin Danielle (Sirjane) Woods, his great-granddaughters Faith Mikel (Rousselle) Bush and Cameron Danielle Woods, and his great-great-grandson, Christopher Odin Bush.

== Medal of Honor citation ==
Captain Olson's official Medal of Honor citation reads:

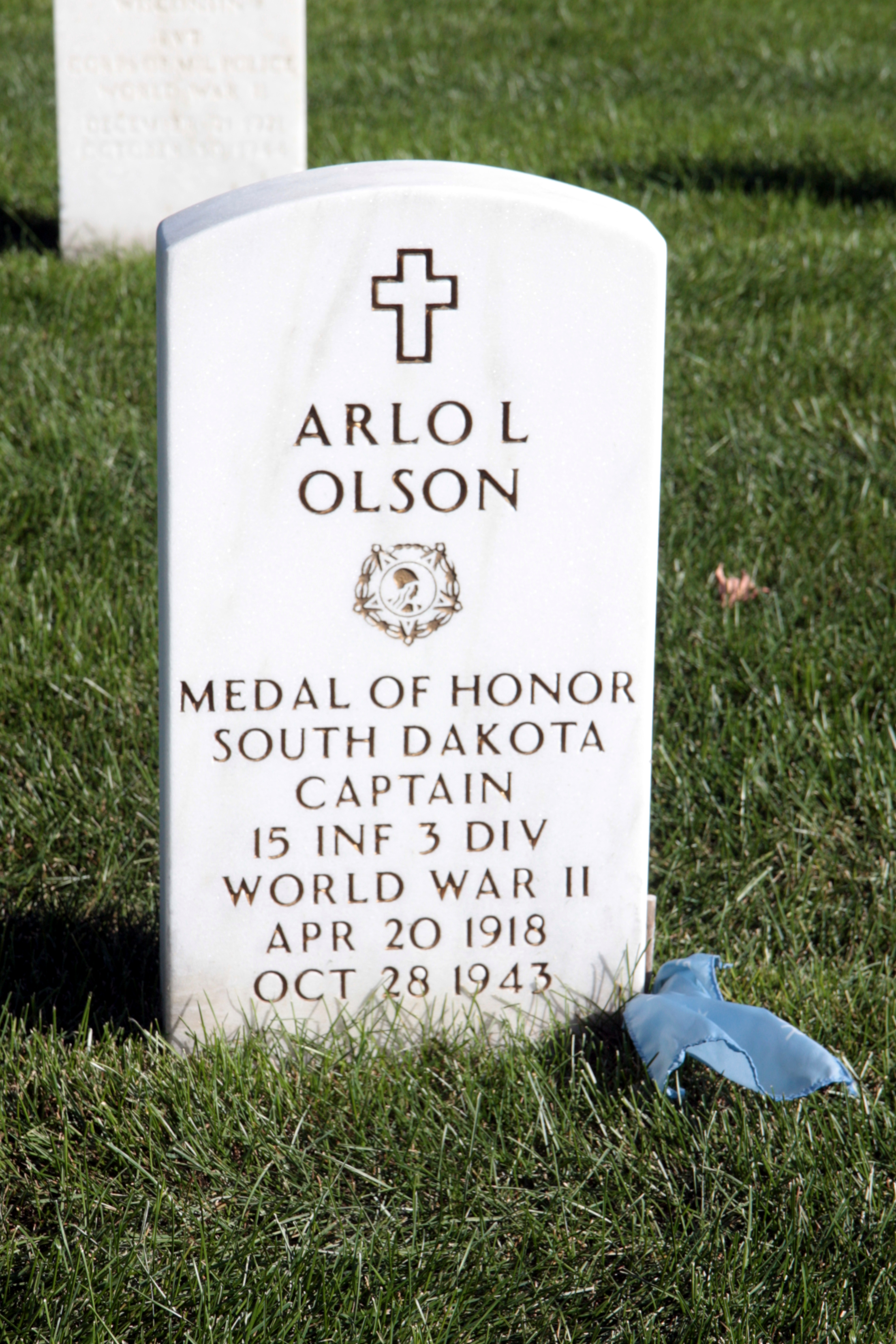
Arlo L. Olson's headstone at Fort Snelling National Cemetery

For conspicuous gallantry and intrepidity at the risk of his life above and beyond the call of duty. On October 13, 1943, when the drive across the Volturno River began, Capt. Olson and his company spearheaded the advance of the regiment through 30 miles of mountainous enemy territory in 13 days. Placing himself at the head of his men, Capt. Olson waded into the chest-deep water of the raging Volturno River and despite pointblank machine-gun fire aimed directly at him made his way to the opposite bank and threw 2 handgrenades into the gun position, killing the crew. When an enemy machinegun 150 yards distant opened fire on his company, Capt. Olson advanced upon the position in a slow, deliberate walk. Although 5 German soldiers threw handgrenades at him from a range of 5 yards, Capt. Olson dispatched them all, picked up a machine pistol and continued toward the enemy. Advancing to within 15 yards of the position he shot it out with the foe, killing 9 and seizing the post. Throughout the next 13 days Capt. Olson led combat patrols, acted as company No. 1 scout and maintained unbroken contact with the enemy. On October 27, 1943, Capt. Olson conducted a platoon in attack on a strongpoint, crawling to within 25 yards of the enemy and then charging the position. Despite continuous machinegun fire which barely missed him, Capt. Olson made his way to the gun and killed the crew with his pistol. When the men saw their leader make this desperate attack they followed him and overran the position. Continuing the advance, Capt. Olson led his company to the next objective at the summit of Monte San Nicola. Although the company to his right was forced to take cover from the furious automatic and small arms fire, which was directed upon him and his men with equal intensity, Capt. Olson waved his company into a skirmish line and despite the fire of a machinegun which singled him out as its sole target led the assault which drove the enemy away. While making a reconnaissance for defensive positions, Capt. Olson was fatally wounded. Ignoring his severe pain, this intrepid officer completed his reconnaissance, supervised the location of his men in the best defense positions, refused medical aid until all of his men had been cared for, and died as he was being carried down the mountain.

== Awards and decorations ==

Badge	Combat Infantryman Badge		
1st row	Medal of Honor		Silver Star
2nd row	Bronze Star Medal	Purple Heart	American Defense Service Medal
3rd row	American Campaign Medal	European–African–Middle Eastern Campaign Medal with 2 Campaign stars	World War II Victory Medal
Unit awards	Presidential Unit Citation		

== See also ==
- List of Medal of Honor recipients
- List of Medal of Honor recipients for World War II
