= Freeman Township, Clay County, Iowa =

Township in Iowa, US

Freeman Township
- Township
- Location in Clay County
- Coordinates: 43°07′34″N 094°58′37″W
- Country: United States
- State: Iowa
- County: Clay

Area
  - Total: 35.67 sq mi (92.39 km^{2})
  - Land: 35.09 sq mi (90.88 km^{2})
  - Water: 0.59 sq mi (1.52 km^{2}) 1.65%
- Elevation: 1,339 ft (408 m)

Population (2000)
  - Total: 444
  - Density: 13/sq mi (4.9/km^{2})
- GNIS feature ID: 0467871

Freeman Township is a township in Clay County, Iowa, USA. As of the 2000 census, its population was 444.

== History ==
Freeman Township was created in 1882.

== Geography ==
Freeman Township covers an area of 35.67 square miles (92.4 km^{2}) and contains one incorporated settlement, Dickens. According to the USGS, it contains one cemetery, Dickens.

The stream of Pickerel Run runs through this township. Also located in the township is Barringer Slough.
