= Mud Lake (Iowa) =

There are several lakes named Mud Lake within the U.S. state of Iowa.

== Clay County ==
Mud Lake is a lake on the Clay-Palo Alto County line. 43°11′21″N 94°54′54″W

Mud Lake is a lake in southeastern corner of Clay County. 42°55′52″N 94°55′54″W

Mud Lake State Wildlife Management Area is on this site.

== Dubuque County ==
Mud Lake is a bay along the Mississippi River in Peru Township of Dubuque County. 42°36′46″N 90°42′09″W

It was a lake until Lock and Dam No. 11 flooded the banks of the river. This former lake is part of the Upper Mississippi River Wildlife and Fish Refuge.

== Linn County ==
Mud Lake is a lake in Monroe Township of Linn County. 42°03′57″N 91°46′26″W

It is an Oxbow lake of the Cedar River. The lake is within the Chain Lakes Game Management Area.
