= Greenville, Iowa =

- City
- Coordinates: 43°01′01″N 95°08′46″W
- Country: USA
- State: Iowa
- County: Clay
- Incorporated: December 30, 1916

Area
  - Total: 0.17 sq mi (0.43 km^{2})
  - Land: 0.17 sq mi (0.43 km^{2})
  - Water: 0 sq mi (0.00 km^{2})
- Elevation: 1,391 ft (424 m)

Population (2020)
  - Total: 71
  - Density: 428.2/sq mi (165.34/km^{2})
- Time zone: UTC-6 (Central (CST))
  - Summer (DST): UTC-5 (CDT)
- ZIP code: 51343
- Area code: 712
- FIPS code: 19-32970
- GNIS feature ID: 2394996

Greenville is a city in Clay County, Iowa, United States. The population was 71 in the 2020 census, a decline from 93 in 2000.

== History ==
The Greenville post office opened in 1871. The town was named after its first postmaster, A. W. Green.

=== Bank robbery of 1901 ===
On November 16, 1901, a Mr. Brown opened the bank in Greenville and discovered that the bank had been robbed; the vault handle had been removed, explosives placed into the opening, and the vault door blown off.

Three men were seen later in Spencer, then Webb, and finally Albert City, where they were cornered at the train station. A gunfight ensued, during which one of the gunmen was killed. The other two were captured and later sentenced to life terms in the Iowa State Penitentiary in Fort Madison, while the dead gunman was buried in an unmarked grave in Fairfield Cemetery in Albert City. Sixty-four empty shell casings were picked up in the depot after the gun fight.

== Geography ==
According to the United States Census Bureau, the city has a total area of 0.18 square miles (0.47 km^{2}), all land.

== Demographics ==
Historical population
| Census | Pop. | Note | %± |
|---|---|---|---|
| 1920 | 167 | | — |
| 1930 | 168 | | 0.6% |
| 1940 | 169 | | 0.6% |
| 1950 | 173 | | 2.4% |
| 1960 | 173 | | 0.0% |
| 1970 | 117 | | −32.4% |
| 1980 | 122 | | 4.3% |
| 1990 | 84 | | −31.1% |
| 2000 | 93 | | 10.7% |
| 2010 | 75 | | −19.4% |
| 2020 | 71 | | −5.3% |
U.S. Decennial Census

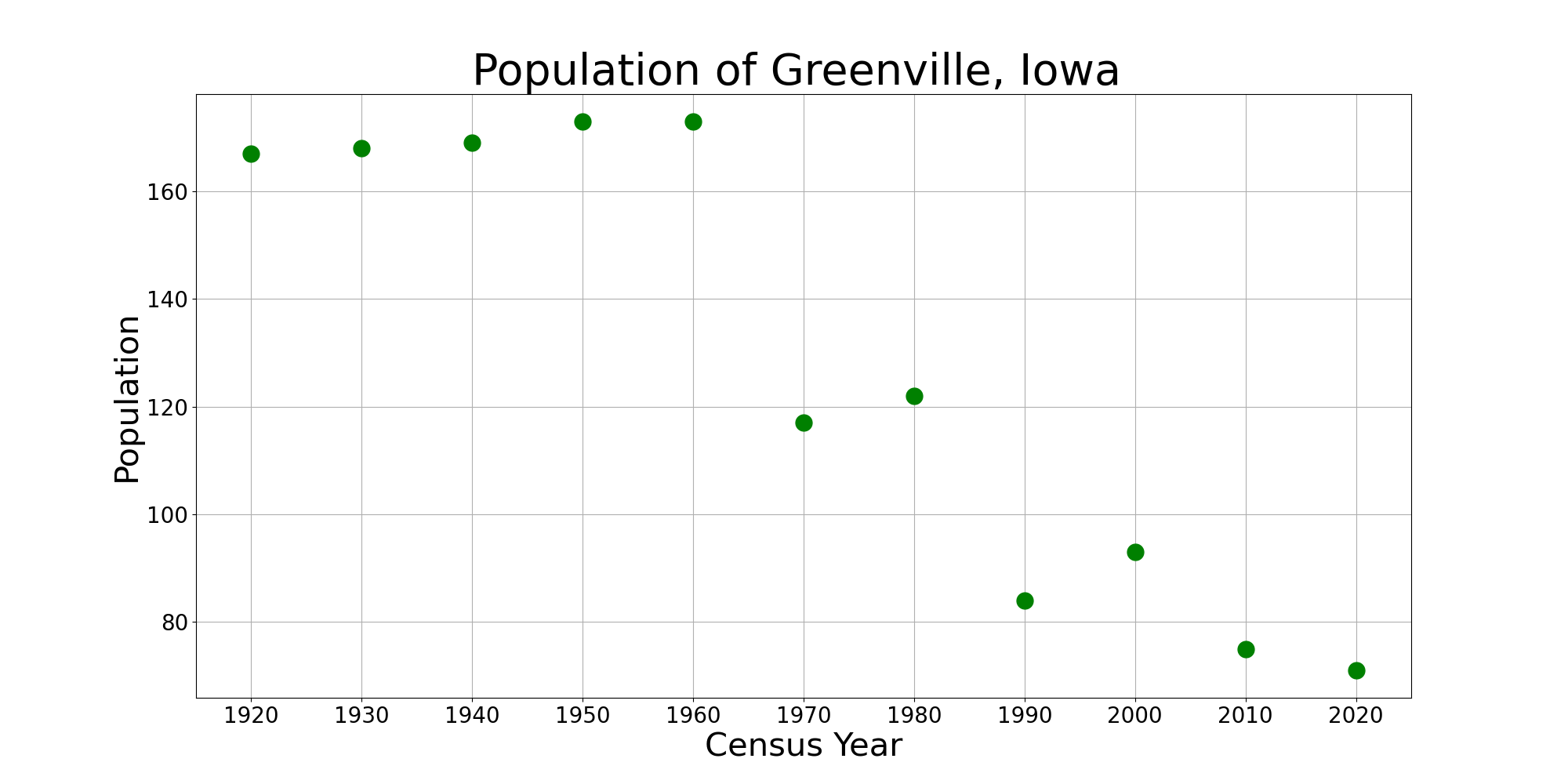
The population of Greenville, Iowa from US census data

=== 2020 census ===
As of the census of 2020, there were 71 people, 18 households, and 10 families residing in the city. The population density was 428.2 inhabitants per square mile (165.3/km^{2}). There were 32 housing units at an average density of 193.0 per square mile (74.5/km^{2}). The racial makeup of the city was 95.8% White, 0.0% Black or African American, 0.0% Native American, 0.0% Asian, 0.0% Pacific Islander, 0.0% from other races and 4.2% from two or more races. Hispanic or Latino persons of any race comprised 0.0% of the population.

Of the 18 households, 33.3% of which had children under the age of 18 living with them, 44.4% were married couples living together, 5.6% were cohabitating couples, 22.2% had a female householder with no spouse or partner present and 27.8% had a male householder with no spouse or partner present. 44.4% of all households were non-families. 44.4% of all households were made up of individuals, 5.6% had someone living alone who was 65 years old or older.

The median age in the city was 30.5 years. 33.8% of the residents were under the age of 20; 4.2% were between the ages of 20 and 24; 25.4% were from 25 and 44; 18.3% were from 45 and 64; and 18.3% were 65 years of age or older. The gender makeup of the city was 50.7% male and 49.3% female.

=== 2010 census ===
As of the census of 2010, there were 75 people, 30 households, and 18 families residing in the city. The population density was 416.7 inhabitants per square mile (160.9/km^{2}). There were 34 housing units at an average density of 188.9 per square mile (72.9/km^{2}). The racial makeup of the city was 96.0% White and 4.0% Native American. Hispanic or Latino of any race were 2.7% of the population.

There were 30 households, of which 30.0% had children under the age of 18 living with them, 56.7% were married couples living together, 3.3% had a female householder with no husband present, and 40.0% were non-families. 30.0% of all households were made up of individuals, and 16.7% had someone living alone who was 65 years of age or older. The average household size was 2.50 and the average family size was 3.17.

The median age in the city was 36.8 years. 24% of residents were under the age of 18; 9.3% were between the ages of 18 and 24; 26.6% were from 25 to 44; 29.3% were from 45 to 64; and 10.7% were 65 years of age or older. The gender makeup of the city was 49.3% male and 50.7% female.

=== 2000 census ===
As of the census of 2000, there were 93 people, 34 households, and 24 families residing in the city. The population density was 470/sq mi (180/km^{2}). There were 37 housing units at a density of 190/sq mi (71/km^{2}). The racial makeup of the city was 100.00% White.

There were 34 households, out of which 38.2% had children under the age of 18 living with them, 70.6% were married couples living together, 2.9% had a female householder with no husband present, and 26.5% were non-families. 23.5% of all households were made up of individuals, and 11.8% had someone living alone who was 65 years of age or older. The average household size was 2.74 and the average family size was 3.20.

In the city, the population was spread out, with 31.2% under the age of 18, 5.4% from 18 to 24, 26.9% from 25 to 44, 26.9% from 45 to 64, and 9.7% who were 65 years of age or older. The median age was 38 years. For every 100 females, there were 102.2 males. For every 100 females age 18 and over, there were 93.9 males.

The median income for a household in the city was $29,531, and the median income for a family was $37,500. Males had a median income of $34,063 versus $21,250 for females. The per capita income for the city was $22,217. There were 18.8% of families and 19.2% of the population living below the poverty line, including 23.8% of under eighteens and none of those over 64.

=== Notable people ===
- Merlyn Hans Dethlefsen, Medal of Honor recipient Colonel USAF, was born in Greenville.
- Nathan E. Kendall, 23rd Governor of Iowa, was born in Greenville.
- Arlo L. Olson, Medal of Honor recipient Captain United States Army, was born in Greenville.

== Education ==
Clay Central–Everly Community School District operates public schools serving the community.
