= Rossie, Iowa =

- City
- Location of Rossie, Iowa
- Coordinates: 43°00′49″N 95°11′19″W
- Country: USA
- State: Iowa
- County: Clay
- Incorporated: August 30, 1922

Area
  - Total: 0.14 sq mi (0.37 km^{2})
  - Land: 0.14 sq mi (0.37 km^{2})
  - Water: 0 sq mi (0.00 km^{2})
- Elevation: 1,411 ft (430 m)

Population (2020)
  - Total: 49
  - Density: 339.1/sq mi (130.93/km^{2})
- Time zone: UTC-6 (Central (CST))
  - Summer (DST): UTC-5 (CDT)
- ZIP code: 51357
- Area code: 712
- FIPS code: 19-68925
- GNIS feature ID: 2396437

Rossie is a city in Clay County, Iowa, United States. The population was 49 in the 2020 census, a decrease from 58 in 2000. The Rossie post office opened in 1900, closing in 1984.

== Geography ==
According to the United States Census Bureau, the city has a total area of 0.15 square miles (0.39 km^{2}), all land.

== Demographics ==
Historical population
Census	Pop.	Note	%±
1930	85		—
1940	95		11.8%
1950	112		17.9%
1960	102		−8.9%
1970	91		−10.8%
1980	72		−20.9%
1990	68		−5.6%
2000	58		−14.7%
2010	70		20.7%
2020	49		−30.0%
U.S. Decennial Census

=== 2020 census ===
As of the census of 2020, there were 49 people, 22 households, and 18 families residing in the city. The population density was 339.1 inhabitants per square mile (130.9/km^{2}). There were 27 housing units at an average density of 186.9 per square mile (72.1/km^{2}). The racial makeup of the city was 93.9% White, 0.0% Black or African American, 0.0% Native American, 0.0% Asian, 0.0% Pacific Islander, 0.0% from other races and 6.1% from two or more races. Hispanic or Latino persons of any race comprised 0.0% of the population.

Of the 22 households, 31.8% of which had children under the age of 18 living with them, 68.2% were married couples living together, 4.5% were cohabitating couples, 9.1% had a female householder with no spouse or partner present and 18.2% had a male householder with no spouse or partner present. 18.2% of all households were non-families. 18.2% of all households were made up of individuals, 4.5% had someone living alone who was 65 years old or older.

The median age in the city was 42.3 years. 30.6% of the residents were under the age of 20; 2.0% were between the ages of 20 and 24; 20.4% were from 25 and 44; 30.6% were from 45 and 64; and 16.3% were 65 years of age or older. The gender makeup of the city was 59.2% male and 40.8% female.

=== 2010 census ===
As of the census of 2010, there were 70 people, 26 households, and 20 families living in the city. The population density was 466.7 inhabitants per square mile (180.2/km^{2}). There were 29 housing units at an average density of 193.3 per square mile (74.6/km^{2}). The racial makeup of the city was 95.7% White and 4.3% from two or more races. Hispanic or Latino of any race were 5.7% of the population.

There were 26 households, of which 38.5% had children under the age of 18 living with them, 57.7% were married couples living together, 3.8% had a female householder with no husband present, 15.4% had a male householder with no wife present, and 23.1% were non-families. 23.1% of all households were made up of individuals, and 3.8% had someone living alone who was 65 years of age or older. The average household size was 2.69 and the average family size was 3.00.

The median age in the city was 35.5 years. 30% of residents were under the age of 18; 8.6% were between the ages of 18 and 24; 32.9% were from 25 to 44; 24.3% were from 45 to 64; and 4.3% were 65 years of age or older. The gender makeup of the city was 52.9% male and 47.1% female.

=== 2000 census ===
As of the census of 2000, there were 58 people, 22 households, and 15 families living in the city. The population density was 385.5 inhabitants per square mile (148.8/km^{2}). There were 26 housing units at an average density of 172.8 per square mile (66.7/km^{2}). The racial makeup of the city was 100.00% White.

There were 22 households, out of which 31.8% had children under the age of 18 living with them, 63.6% were married couples living together, and 27.3% were non-families. 22.7% of all households were made up of individuals, and 9.1% had someone living alone who was 65 years of age or older. The average household size was 2.64 and the average family size was 2.94.

In the city, the population was spread out, with 29.3% under the age of 18, 3.4% from 18 to 24, 36.2% from 25 to 44, 27.6% from 45 to 64, and 3.4% who were 65 years of age or older. The median age was 31 years. For every 100 females, there were 114.8 males. For every 100 females age 18 and over, there were 105.0 males.

The median income for a household in the city was $30,833, and the median income for a family was $41,250. Males had a median income of $29,219 versus $11,875 for females. The per capita income for the city was $13,266. There were 11.1% of families and 9.5% of the population living below the poverty line, including no under eighteens and none of those over 64.

== Education ==
Clay Central–Everly Community School District operates public schools serving the community.
