= Royal, Iowa =

- City
- Location of Royal, Iowa
- Coordinates: 43°03′52″N 95°17′01″W
- Country: USA
- State: Iowa
- County: Clay

Area
  - Total: 0.29 sq mi (0.76 km^{2})
  - Land: 0.29 sq mi (0.76 km^{2})
  - Water: 0 sq mi (0.00 km^{2})
- Elevation: 1,414 ft (431 m)

Population (2020)
  - Total: 379
  - Density: 1,284.6/sq mi (495.97/km^{2})
- Time zone: UTC-6 (Central (CST))
  - Summer (DST): UTC-5 (CDT)
- ZIP code: 51357
- Area code: 712
- FIPS code: 19-69105
- GNIS feature ID: 2396443

Royal is a city in Clay County, Iowa, United States. The population was 379 in the 2020 census, a decline from 479 in 2000.

== Geography ==
According to the United States Census Bureau, the city has a total area of 0.30 square miles (0.78 km^{2}), all land.

== Demographics ==
Historical population
Census	Pop.	Note	%±
1920	362		—
1930	410		13.3%
1940	426		3.9%
1950	495		16.2%
1960	475		−4.0%
1970	469		−1.3%
1980	522		11.3%
1990	466		−10.7%
2000	479		2.8%
2010	446		−6.9%
2020	379		−15.0%
U.S. Decennial Census

=== 2020 census ===
As of the census of 2020, there were 379 people, 168 households, and 99 families residing in the city. The population density was 1,284.5 inhabitants per square mile (496.0/km^{2}). There were 202 housing units at an average density of 684.6 per square mile (264.3/km^{2}). The racial makeup of the city was 95.5% White, 0.3% Black or African American, 0.8% Native American, 0.0% Asian, 0.0% Pacific Islander, 0.8% from other races and 2.6% from two or more races. Hispanic or Latino persons of any race comprised 2.9% of the population.

Of the 168 households, 20.8% of which had children under the age of 18 living with them, 50.6% were married couples living together, 6.0% were cohabitating couples, 19.0% had a female householder with no spouse or partner present and 24.4% had a male householder with no spouse or partner present. 41.1% of all households were non-families. 37.5% of all households were made up of individuals, 17.3% had someone living alone who was 65 years old or older.

The median age in the city was 40.9 years. 22.4% of the residents were under the age of 20; 7.1% were between the ages of 20 and 24; 25.1% were from 25 and 44; 24.3% were from 45 and 64; and 21.1% were 65 years of age or older. The gender makeup of the city was 50.7% male and 49.3% female.

=== 2010 census ===
As of the census of 2010, there were 446 people, 191 households, and 122 families living in the city. The population density was 1,486.7 inhabitants per square mile (574.0/km^{2}). There were 202 housing units at an average density of 673.3 per square mile (260.0/km^{2}). The racial makeup of the city was 95.5% White, 0.2% African American, 1.3% from other races, and 2.9% from two or more races. Hispanic or Latino of any race were 2.7% of the population.

There were 191 households, of which 30.9% had children under the age of 18 living with them, 47.1% were married couples living together, 11.0% had a female householder with no husband present, 5.8% had a male householder with no wife present, and 36.1% were non-families. 29.3% of all households were made up of individuals, and 12.6% had someone living alone who was 65 years of age or older. The average household size was 2.34 and the average family size was 2.88.

The median age in the city was 36.8 years. 24.9% of residents were under the age of 18; 7% were between the ages of 18 and 24; 24.6% were from 25 to 44; 29.4% were from 45 to 64; and 14.1% were 65 years of age or older. The gender makeup of the city was 50.0% male and 50.0% female.

=== 2000 census ===
As of the census of 2000, there were 479 people, 194 households, and 131 families living in the city. The population density was 1,634.2 inhabitants per square mile (631.0/km^{2}). There were 219 housing units at an average density of 747.2 per square mile (288.5/km^{2}). The racial makeup of the city was 99.58% White, and 0.42% from two or more races. Hispanic or Latino of any race were 0.84% of the population.

There were 194 households, out of which 35.6% had children under the age of 18 living with them, 51.5% were married couples living together, 11.3% had a female householder with no husband present, and 32.0% were non-families. 28.4% of all households were made up of individuals, and 14.4% had someone living alone who was 65 years of age or older. The average household size was 2.47 and the average family size was 3.02.

In the city, the population was spread out, with 27.6% under the age of 18, 7.9% from 18 to 24, 26.7% from 25 to 44, 20.5% from 45 to 64, and 17.3% who were 65 years of age or older. The median age was 36 years. For every 100 females, there were 97.9 males. For every 100 females age 18 and over, there were 97.2 males.

The median income for a household in the city was $37,500, and the median income for a family was $41,146. Males had a median income of $29,107 versus $18,281 for females. The per capita income for the city was $18,118. About 3.3% of families and 4.7% of the population were below the poverty line, including 4.5% of those under age 18 and 6.4% of those age 65 or over.

== Education ==
Clay Central–Everly Community School District operates public schools serving the community.
