= Grand Avenue Historic Commercial District =

Historic district in Iowa, United States

- U.S. National Register of Historic Places
- U.S. Historic district
- Location within Iowa Location within the United States
- Location: 301-605 Grand Ave., 12-18, 21 W. 5th St., and 10, 13, and 15-19 W. 4th St., Spencer, Iowa
- Coordinates: 43°08′35″N 95°08′41″W
- Area: 11 acres (4.5 ha)
- Architect: W.C. Barton
- Architectural style: Romanesque Revival; Classical Revival
- NRHP reference No.: 04001322
- Added to NRHP: December 6, 2004

Grand Avenue Historic Commercial District is a nationally recognized historic district located in Spencer, Iowa, United States. It was listed on the National Register of Historic Places in 2004. At the time of its nomination the district consisted of 57 resources, including 39 contributing buildings, and 18 noncontributing buildings. The district cover's most of the city's central business district, mainly along Grand Avenue, but on some of the intersecting streets as well. In addition to commercial buildings, the district also includes the post office, a theater, and a fraternal lodge. The commercial Romanesque Revival and Neoclassical styles are dominant. The period of significance begins in 1913 when a building boom of more "modern" construction began and ends in 1935. A fire started by fireworks destroyed nearly two full blocks, and affected 70 businesses and professional offices. The architects who designed the new buildings went for a unified approach utilizing a Spanish/Mission influence. The Iowa Legislature passed a law banning the sale of fireworks throughout the state.
