= Herdland Township, Clay County, Iowa =

Township in Iowa, US

Herdland Township
- Township
- Location in Clay County
- Coordinates: 42°56′58″N 095°05′00″W
- Country: United States
- State: Iowa
- County: Clay

Area
  - Total: 35.57 sq mi (92.12 km^{2})
  - Land: 35.6 sq mi (92.1 km^{2})
  - Water: 0.0039 sq mi (0.01 km^{2}) 0.01%
- Elevation: 1,362 ft (415 m)

Population (2000)
  - Total: 210
  - Density: 6.0/sq mi (2.3/km^{2})
- GNIS feature ID: 0468029

Herdland Township is a township in Clay County, Iowa, USA. As of the 2000 census, its population was 210.

== History ==
Herdland Township was created in 1873.

== Geography ==
Herdland Township covers an area of 35.57 square miles (92.1 km^{2}) and contains no incorporated settlements, although the unincorporated community of Cornell is located here. According to the USGS, it contains three cemeteries: Burr Oak, Liberty and Osborn.

The streams of Montgomery Creek and Willow Creek run through this township.
