= Fostoria, Iowa =

- City
- Location of Fostoria, Iowa
- Coordinates: 43°14′35″N 95°09′18″W
- Country: USA
- State: Iowa
- County: Clay

Area
  - Total: 0.41 sq mi (1.05 km^{2})
  - Land: 0.41 sq mi (1.05 km^{2})
  - Water: 0 sq mi (0.00 km^{2})
- Elevation: 1,453 ft (443 m)

Population (2020)
  - Total: 230
  - Density: 566.2/sq mi (218.61/km^{2})
- Time zone: UTC-6 (Central (CST))
  - Summer (DST): UTC-5 (CDT)
- ZIP code: 51340
- Area code: 712
- FIPS code: 19-28650
- GNIS feature ID: 2394800

Fostoria is a city in Clay County, Iowa, United States. The population was 230 in the 2020 census, unchanged from the 2000.

== Geography ==
According to the United States Census Bureau, the city has a total area of 0.47 square miles (1.22 km^{2}), all land.

== Demographics ==
Historical population
Census	Pop.	Note	%±
1920	119		—
1930	142		19.3%
1940	136		−4.2%
1950	147		8.1%
1960	167		13.6%
1970	219		31.1%
1980	261		19.2%
1990	205		−21.5%
2000	230		12.2%
2010	231		0.4%
2020	230		−0.4%
U.S. Decennial Census

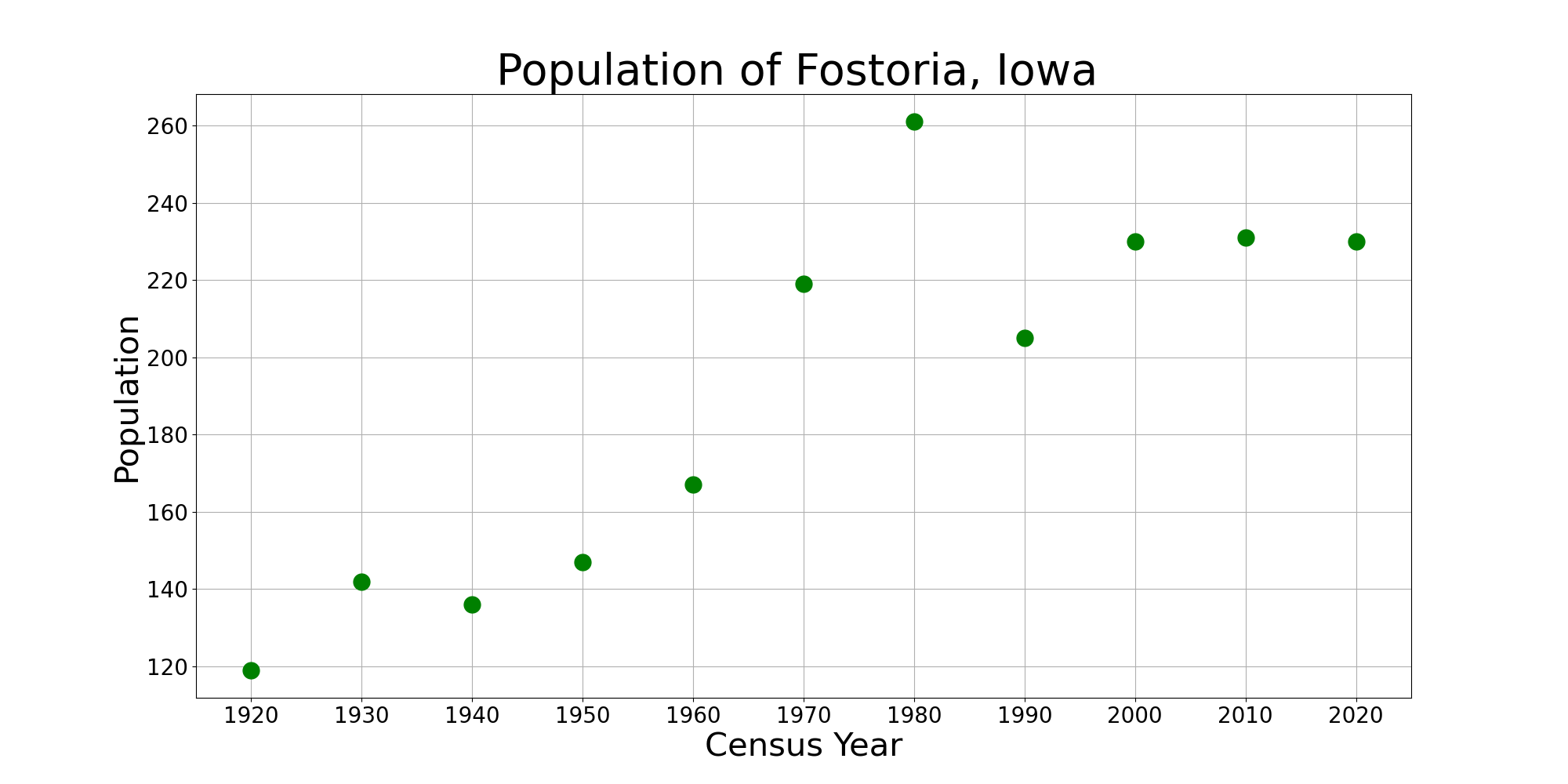
The population of Fostoria, Iowa from US census data

=== 2020 census ===
As of the census of 2020, there were 230 people, 92 households, and 62 families residing in the city. The population density was 566.2 inhabitants per square mile (218.6/km^{2}). There were 106 housing units at an average density of 260.9 per square mile (100.7/km^{2}). The racial makeup of the city was 91.7% White, 0.9% Black or African American, 0.0% Native American, 0.0% Asian, 0.0% Pacific Islander, 0.0% from other races and 7.4% from two or more races. Hispanic or Latino persons of any race comprised 3.5% of the population.

Of the 92 households, 29.3% of which had children under the age of 18 living with them, 58.7% were married couples living together, 5.4% were cohabitating couples, 18.5% had a female householder with no spouse or partner present and 17.4% had a male householder with no spouse or partner present. 32.6% of all households were non-families. 28.3% of all households were made up of individuals, 15.2% had someone living alone who was 65 years old or older.

The median age in the city was 46.7 years. 21.7% of the residents were under the age of 20; 4.3% were between the ages of 20 and 24; 18.7% were from 25 and 44; 35.2% were from 45 and 64; and 20.0% were 65 years of age or older. The gender makeup of the city was 50.9% male and 49.1% female.

=== 2010 census ===
As of the census of 2010, there were 231 people, 87 households, and 63 families residing in the city. The population density was 491.5 inhabitants per square mile (189.8/km^{2}). There were 94 housing units at an average density of 200.0 per square mile (77.2/km^{2}). The racial makeup of the city was 96.5% White, 0.4% Asian, 0.9% from other races, and 2.2% from two or more races. Hispanic or Latino of any race were 2.6% of the population.

There were 87 households, of which 36.8% had children under the age of 18 living with them, 57.5% were married couples living together, 8.0% had a female householder with no husband present, 6.9% had a male householder with no wife present, and 27.6% were non-families. 20.7% of all households were made up of individuals, and 6.9% had someone living alone who was 65 years of age or older. The average household size was 2.66 and the average family size was 3.14.

The median age in the city was 39.3 years. 28.6% of residents were under the age of 18; 3% were between the ages of 18 and 24; 27.8% were from 25 to 44; 30.8% were from 45 to 64; and 10% were 65 years of age or older. The gender makeup of the city was 51.1% male and 48.9% female.

=== 2000 census ===
As of the census of 2000, there were 230 people, 95 households, and 70 families residing in the city. The population density was 483.7 inhabitants per square mile (186.8/km^{2}). There were 97 housing units at an average density of 204.0 per square mile (78.8/km^{2}). The racial makeup of the city was 96.96% White, 0.43% African American, 0.87% Asian, 0.43% from other races, and 1.30% from two or more races. Hispanic or Latino of any race were 0.87% of the population.

There were 95 households, out of which 36.8% had children under the age of 18 living with them, 60.0% were married couples living together, 9.5% had a female householder with no husband present, and 26.3% were non-families. 20.0% of all households were made up of individuals, and 6.3% had someone living alone who was 65 years of age or older. The average household size was 2.42 and the average family size was 2.77.

In the city, the population was spread out, with 26.5% under the age of 18, 2.6% from 18 to 24, 36.1% from 25 to 44, 22.6% from 45 to 64, and 12.2% who were 65 years of age or older. The median age was 37 years. For every 100 females, there were 100.0 males. For every 100 females age 18 and over, there were 92.0 males.

The median income for a household in the city was $38,750, and the median income for a family was $42,250. Males had a median income of $30,313 versus $20,125 for females. The per capita income for the city was $15,952. None of the families and 2.2% of the population were living below the poverty line, including no under eighteens and 12.0% of those over 64.

== Education ==
Most of the community is served by the Okoboji Community School District. The district was established on July 1, 1988, by the merger of the Arnolds Park and Milford school districts. Okoboji High School in Milford is the local high school.

A small part of Fostoria is within the Spencer Community School District.
