= Everly, Iowa =

- City
- Motto(s): "Proud of Our Past, Faith in Our Future"
- Location of Everly, Iowa
- Coordinates: 43°09′43″N 95°19′10″W
- Country: USA
- State: Iowa
- County: Clay
- Founded: 1884
- Incorporated: April 7, 1902

Area
  - Total: 1.06 sq mi (2.75 km^{2})
  - Land: 1.05 sq mi (2.71 km^{2})
  - Water: 0.015 sq mi (0.04 km^{2})
- Elevation: 1,352 ft (412 m)

Population (2020)
  - Total: 575
  - Density: 549.4/sq mi (212.11/km^{2})
- Time zone: UTC-6 (Central (CST))
  - Summer (DST): UTC-5 (CDT)
- ZIP code: 51338
- Area code: 712
- FIPS code: 19-26175
- GNIS feature ID: 2394714

Everly is a city in Clay County, Iowa, United States. The population was 575 in the 2020 census, a decline from 647 in 2000. The Ocheyedan River flows to the south and west of the city.

== History ==
Everly was founded as Clark in 1884, but soon took its current name because there was already a Clarke, Iowa. Everly incorporated on April 7, 1902.

== Geography ==
According to the United States Census Bureau, the city has a total area of 1.11 square miles (2.9 km^{2}), of which 1.09 square miles (2.8 km^{2}) is land and 0.02 square miles (0.052 km^{2}) is water.

== Demographics ==
Historical population
Census	Pop.	Note	%±
1910	392		—
1920	480		22.4%
1930	482		0.4%
1940	523		8.5%
1950	547		4.6%
1960	668		22.1%
1970	699		4.6%
1980	796		13.9%
1990	706		−11.3%
2000	647		−8.4%
2010	603		−6.8%
2020	575		−4.6%
U.S. Decennial Census

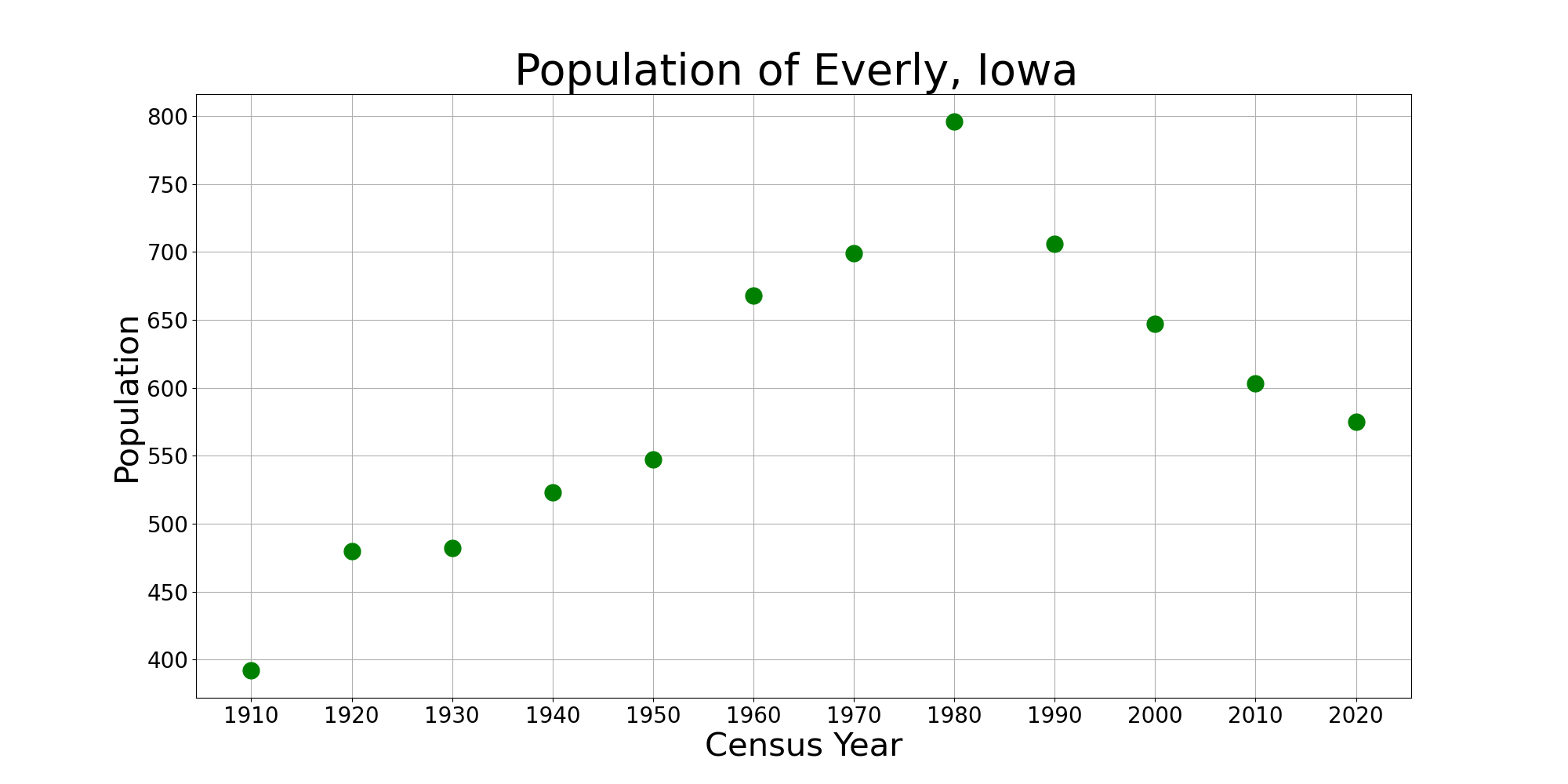
The population of Everly, Iowa from US census data

=== 2020 census ===
As of the census of 2020, there were 575 people, 260 households, and 157 families residing in the city. The population density was 549.4 inhabitants per square mile (212.1/km^{2}). There were 284 housing units at an average density of 271.3 per square mile (104.8/km^{2}). The racial makeup of the city was 96.0% White, 0.3% Black or African American, 0.3% Native American, 0.9% Asian, 0.0% Pacific Islander, 0.2% from other races and 2.3% from two or more races. Hispanic or Latino persons of any race comprised 1.7% of the population.

Of the 260 households, 27.7% of which had children under the age of 18 living with them, 45.4% were married couples living together, 8.5% were cohabitating couples, 24.2% had a female householder with no spouse or partner present and 21.9% had a male householder with no spouse or partner present. 39.6% of all households were non-families. 35.0% of all households were made up of individuals, 11.5% had someone living alone who was 65 years old or older.

The median age in the city was 42.5 years. 23.8% of the residents were under the age of 20; 3.1% were between the ages of 20 and 24; 25.7% were from 25 and 44; 27.1% were from 45 and 64; and 20.2% were 65 years of age or older. The gender makeup of the city was 51.1% male and 48.9% female.

=== 2010 census ===
As of the census of 2010, there were 603 people, 270 households, and 171 families residing in the city. The population density was 553.2 inhabitants per square mile (213.6/km^{2}). There were 294 housing units at an average density of 269.7 per square mile (104.1/km^{2}). The racial makeup of the city was 99.7% White, 0.2% Native American, and 0.2% from two or more races. Hispanic or Latino of any race were 1.0% of the population.

There were 270 households, of which 30.4% had children under the age of 18 living with them, 51.5% were married couples living together, 7.0% had a female householder with no husband present, 4.8% had a male householder with no wife present, and 36.7% were non-families. 32.6% of all households were made up of individuals, and 13.7% had someone living alone who was 65 years of age or older. The average household size was 2.23 and the average family size was 2.82.

The median age in the city was 42.8 years. 23.4% of residents were under the age of 18; 5.3% were between the ages of 18 and 24; 23.6% were from 25 to 44; 29.4% were from 45 to 64; and 18.4% were 65 years of age or older. The gender makeup of the city was 51.4% male and 48.6% female.

=== 2000 census ===
As of the census of 2000, there were 647 people, 277 households, and 185 families residing in the city. The population density was 587.8 inhabitants per square mile (227.0/km^{2}). There were 296 housing units at an average density of 268.9 per square mile (103.8/km^{2}). The racial makeup of the city was 99.23% White, and 0.77% from two or more races.

There were 277 households, out of which 31.4% had children under the age of 18 living with them, 56.0% were married couples living together, 7.2% had a female householder with no husband present, and 32.9% were non-families. 30.3% of all households were made up of individuals, and 15.9% had someone living alone who was 65 years of age or older. The average household size was 2.34 and the average family size was 2.89.

In the city, the population was spread out, with 26.3% under the age of 18, 7.4% from 18 to 24, 24.3% from 25 to 44, 25.2% from 45 to 64, and 16.8% who were 65 years of age or older. The median age was 39 years. For every 100 females, there were 97.3 males. For every 100 females age 18 and over, there were 95.5 males.

The median income for a household in the city was $35,278, and the median income for a family was $41,458. Males had a median income of $30,192 versus $21,375 for females. The per capita income for the city was $15,996. About 1.7% of families and 3.0% of the population were below the poverty line, including 4.5% of those under age 18 and none of those age 65 or over.

== Education ==
Clay Central–Everly Community School District operates public schools serving the community. It was a part of the Everly School District until July 1, 1993, when it merged with Clay Central into Clay Central–Everly.

Formerly the Fire Department and City Hall, the library is situated on the east side of Main Street.

== Notable residents ==
- Francis H. Case, U.S. Senator from South Dakota born in Everly
- Vern Fear, professional baseball player who was born in Everly
- Wattie Holm, professional baseball player who resided in Everly
- Connie Kunzmann, six-on-six basketball player for Everly High School
- Waldo Wegner, Iowa State basketball player born in Everly
