= Webb, Iowa =

- City
- Location of Webb, Iowa
- Coordinates: 42°56′59″N 95°00′47″W
- Country: USA
- State: Iowa
- County: Clay
- Incorporated: April 9, 1901

Area
  - Total: 0.50 sq mi (1.30 km^{2})
  - Land: 0.50 sq mi (1.30 km^{2})
  - Water: 0 sq mi (0.00 km^{2})
- Elevation: 1,385 ft (422 m)

Population (2020)
  - Total: 138
  - Density: 274.2/sq mi (105.87/km^{2})
- Time zone: UTC-6 (Central (CST))
  - Summer (DST): UTC-5 (CDT)
- ZIP code: 51366
- Area code: 712
- FIPS code: 19-83010
- GNIS feature ID: 2397238

Webb is a city in Clay County, Iowa, United States. The population was 138 in the 2020 census, a decline from 165 in 2000. The Webb post office opened in 1900.

== Geography ==
According to the United States Census Bureau, the city has a total area of 0.50 square miles (1.29 km^{2}), all land.

== Demographics ==
Historical population
Census	Pop.	Note	%±
1910	150		—
1920	219		46.0%
1930	240		9.6%
1940	254		5.8%
1950	235		−7.5%
1960	236		0.4%
1970	234		−0.8%
1980	222		−5.1%
1990	167		−24.8%
2000	165		−1.2%
2010	141		−14.5%
2020	138		−2.1%
U.S. Decennial Census

=== 2020 census ===
As of the census of 2020, there were 138 people, 61 households, and 39 families residing in the city. The population density was 274.2 inhabitants per square mile (105.9/km^{2}). There were 72 housing units at an average density of 143.1 per square mile (55.2/km^{2}). The racial makeup of the city was 97.8% White, 0.0% Black or African American, 0.0% Native American, 0.0% Asian, 0.0% Pacific Islander, 0.0% from other races and 2.2% from two or more races. Hispanic or Latino persons of any race comprised 5.1% of the population.

Of the 61 households, 36.1% of which had children under the age of 18 living with them, 49.2% were married couples living together, 6.6% were cohabitating couples, 19.7% had a female householder with no spouse or partner present and 24.6% had a male householder with no spouse or partner present. 36.1% of all households were non-families. 29.5% of all households were made up of individuals, 13.1% had someone living alone who was 65 years old or older.

The median age in the city was 42.0 years. 24.6% of the residents were under the age of 20; 5.8% were between the ages of 20 and 24; 21.7% were from 25 and 44; 24.6% were from 45 and 64; and 23.2% were 65 years of age or older. The gender makeup of the city was 50.7% male and 49.3% female.

=== 2010 census ===
As of the census of 2010, there were 313 people, 63 households, and 40 families living in the city. The population density was 282.0 inhabitants per square mile (108.9/km^{2}). There were 78 housing units at an average density of 156.0 per square mile (60.2/km^{2}). The racial makeup of the city was 99.3% White and 0.7% African American.

There were 63 households, of which 23.8% had children under the age of 18 living with them, 52.4% were married couples living together, 3.2% had a female householder with no husband present, 7.9% had a male householder with no wife present, and 36.5% were non-families. 31.7% of all households were made up of individuals, and 15.9% had someone living alone who was 65 years of age or older. The average household size was 2.24 and the average family size was 2.83.

The median age in the city was 43.5 years. 22.7% of residents were under the age of 18; 6.5% were between the ages of 18 and 24; 22.8% were from 25 to 44; 26.2% were from 45 to 64; and 22% were 65 years of age or older. The gender makeup of the city was 52.5% male and 47.5% female.

=== 2000 census ===
As of the census of 2000, there were 165 people, 73 households, and 44 families living in the city. The population density was 328.0 inhabitants per square mile (126.6/km^{2}). There were 83 housing units at an average density of 165.0 per square mile (63.7/km^{2}). The racial makeup of the city was 99.39% White and 0.61% Native American. Hispanic or Latino of any race were 0.61% of the population.

There were 73 households, out of which 26.0% had children under the age of 18 living with them, 50.7% were married couples living together, 4.1% had a female householder with no husband present, and 38.4% were non-families. 34.2% of all households were made up of individuals, and 20.5% had someone living alone who was 65 years of age or older. The average household size was 2.26 and the average family size was 2.84.

In the city, the population was spread out, with 25.5% under the age of 18, 4.2% from 18 to 24, 24.2% from 25 to 44, 23.6% from 45 to 64, and 22.4% who were 65 years of age or older. The median age was 42 years. For every 100 females, there were 96.4 males. For every 100 females age 18 and over, there were 86.4 males.

The median income for a household in the city was $27,500, and the median income for a family was $31,500. Males had a median income of $30,000 versus $21,528 for females. The per capita income for the city was $13,087. About 10.4% of families and 9.8% of the population were below the poverty line, including 18.8% of those under the age of eighteen and none of those 65 or over.

== Education ==
Sioux Central Community School District serves the community.

Webb was previously a part of the South Clay Community School District; on July 1, 2010, the district was dissolved, with portions going to Sioux Central.
