= Gillett Grove, Iowa =

- City
- Location of Gillett Grove, Iowa
- Coordinates: 43°01′00″N 95°02′12″W
- Country: USA
- State: Iowa
- County: Clay

Area
  - Total: 0.22 sq mi (0.57 km^{2})
  - Land: 0.22 sq mi (0.57 km^{2})
  - Water: 0 sq mi (0.00 km^{2})
- Elevation: 1,345 ft (410 m)

Population (2020)
  - Total: 30
  - Density: 135.2/sq mi (52.19/km^{2})
- Time zone: UTC-6 (Central (CST))
  - Summer (DST): UTC-5 (CDT)
- ZIP code: 51341
- Area code: 712
- FIPS code: 19-30810
- GNIS feature ID: 2394897

Gillett Grove is a city in Clay County, Iowa, United States. The population was 30 in the 2020 census, a decline from 55 in 2000.

== History ==
Gillett Grove was laid out in 1899 when the railroad was extended to that point. The city was named for brothers George and Isaiah Gillett, pioneer settlers.

== Geography ==
According to the United States Census Bureau, the city has a total area of 0.19 square miles (0.49 km^{2}), all land.

== Demographics ==
Historical population
Census	Pop.	Note	%±
1980	93		—
1990	67		−28.0%
2000	55		−17.9%
2010	49		−10.9%
2020	30		−38.8%
U.S. Decennial Census

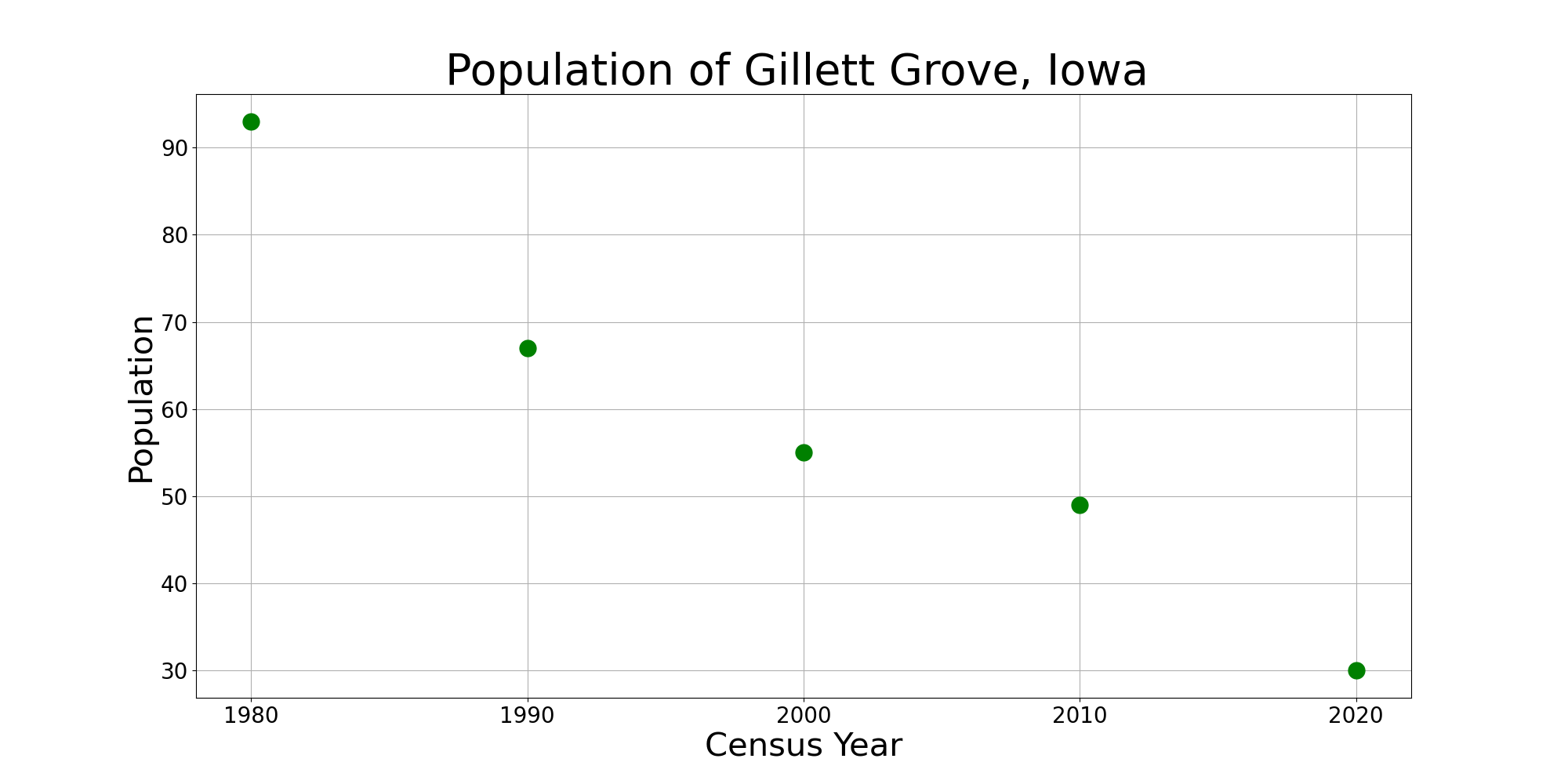
The population of Gillett Grove, Iowa from US census data

=== 2020 census ===
As of the census of 2020, there were 30 people, 19 households, and 11 families residing in the city. The population density was 135.2 inhabitants per square mile (52.2/km^{2}). There were 20 housing units at an average density of 90.1 per square mile (34.8/km^{2}). The racial makeup of the city was 96.7% White, 0.0% Black or African American, 0.0% Native American, 0.0% Asian, 0.0% Pacific Islander, 0.0% from other races and 3.3% from two or more races. Hispanic or Latino persons of any race comprised 0.0% of the population.

Of the 19 households, 36.8% of which had children under the age of 18 living with them, 10.5% were married couples living together, 21.1% were cohabitating couples, 31.6% had a female householder with no spouse or partner present and 36.8% had a male householder with no spouse or partner present. 42.1% of all households were non-families. 36.8% of all households were made up of individuals, 0.0% had someone living alone who was 65 years old or older.

The median age in the city was 45.0 years. 10.0% of the residents were under the age of 20; 6.7% were between the ages of 20 and 24; 33.3% were from 25 and 44; 20.0% were from 45 and 64; and 30.0% were 65 years of age or older. The gender makeup of the city was 60.0% male and 40.0% female.

=== 2010 census ===
As of the census of 2010, there were 49 people, 24 households, and 12 families residing in the city. The population density was 257.9 inhabitants per square mile (99.6/km^{2}). There were 30 housing units at an average density of 157.9 per square mile (61.0/km^{2}). The racial makeup of the city was 98.0% White and 2.0% from two or more races.

There were 24 households, of which 20.8% had children under the age of 18 living with them, 25.0% were married couples living together, 16.7% had a female householder with no husband present, 8.3% had a male householder with no wife present, and 50.0% were non-families. 41.7% of all households were made up of individuals, and 12.5% had someone living alone who was 65 years of age or older. The average household size was 2.04 and the average family size was 2.75.

The median age in the city was 43.3 years. 20.4% of residents were under the age of 18; 12.3% were between the ages of 18 and 24; 20.3% were from 25 to 44; 26.6% were from 45 to 64; and 20.4% were 65 years of age or older. The gender makeup of the city was 51.0% male and 49.0% female.

=== 2000 census ===
As of the census of 2000, there were 55 people, 28 households, and 19 families residing in the city. The population density was 291.6 inhabitants per square mile (112.6/km^{2}). There were 30 housing units at an average density of 159.1 per square mile (61.4/km^{2}). The racial makeup of the city was 98.18% White, and 1.82% from two or more races.

There were 28 households, out of which 32.1% had children under the age of 18 living with them, 46.4% were married couples living together, 10.7% had a female householder with no husband present, and 32.1% were non-families. 32.1% of all households were made up of individuals, and 10.7% had someone living alone who was 65 years of age or older. The average household size was 1.96 and the average family size was 2.21.

In the city, the population was spread out, with 18.2% under the age of 18, 10.9% from 18 to 24, 21.8% from 25 to 44, 25.5% from 45 to 64, and 23.6% who were 65 years of age or older. The median age was 44 years. For every 100 females, there were 89.7 males. For every 100 females age 18 and over, there were 87.5 males.

The median income for a household in the city was $21,429, and the median income for a family was $17,292. Males had a median income of $18,750 versus $21,250 for females. The per capita income for the city was $12,337. There were 13.3% of families and 28.3% of the population living below the poverty line, including 18.2% of under eighteens and none of those over 64.

== Education ==
Gillett Grove is within the Spencer Community School District. It was previously in the South Clay Community School District; on July 1, 2010, that district dissolved, with a portion going to the Spencer district.
