= Dickens, Iowa =

- City
- Location of Dickens, Iowa
- Coordinates: 43°08′02″N 95°01′20″W
- Country: USA
- State: Iowa
- County: Clay

Area
  - Total: 0.83 sq mi (2.16 km^{2})
  - Land: 0.83 sq mi (2.16 km^{2})
  - Water: 0 sq mi (0.00 km^{2})
- Elevation: 1,345 ft (410 m)

Population (2020)
  - Total: 146
  - Density: 175.0/sq mi (67.55/km^{2})
- Time zone: UTC-6 (Central (CST))
  - Summer (DST): UTC-5 (CDT)
- ZIP code: 51333
- Area code: 712
- FIPS code: 19-21360
- GNIS feature ID: 2394533

Dickens is a city in Clay County, Iowa, United States. The population was 146 in the 2020 census, a decline from 202 in 2000.

== History ==
Dickens was founded in 1886.

== Geography ==
According to the United States Census Bureau, the city has a total area of 0.84 square miles (2.18 km^{2}), all land.

== Demographics ==
Historical population
Census	Pop.	Note	%±
1910	255		—
1920	337		32.2%
1930	333		−1.2%
1940	378		13.5%
1950	311		−17.7%
1960	241		−22.5%
1970	240		−0.4%
1980	289		20.4%
1990	214		−26.0%
2000	202		−5.6%
2010	185		−8.4%
2020	146		−21.1%
U.S. Decennial Census

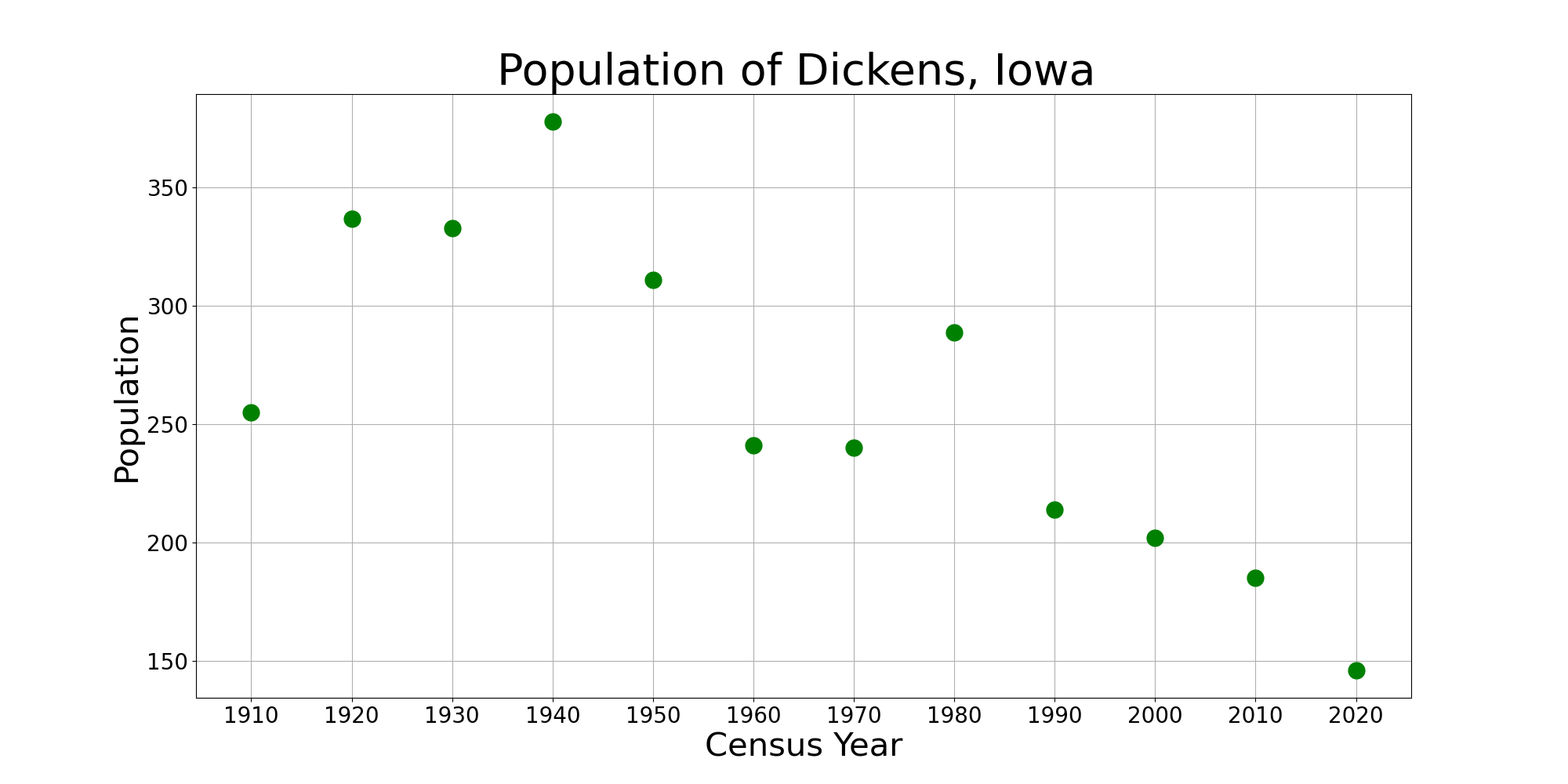
The population of Dickens, Iowa from US census data

=== 2020 census ===
As of the census of 2020, there were 146 people, 61 households, and 46 families residing in the city. The population density was 174.9 inhabitants per square mile (67.5/km^{2}). There were 67 housing units at an average density of 80.3 per square mile (31.0/km^{2}). The racial makeup of the city was 97.9% White, 1.4% Black or African American, 0.0% Native American, 0.0% Asian, 0.0% Pacific Islander, 0.7% from other races and 0.0% from two or more races. Hispanic or Latino persons of any race comprised 0.7% of the population.

Of the 61 households, 27.9% of which had children under the age of 18 living with them, 55.7% were married couples living together, 9.8% were cohabitating couples, 13.1% had a female householder with no spouse or partner present and 21.3% had a male householder with no spouse or partner present. 24.6% of all households were non-families. 18.0% of all households were made up of individuals, 6.6% had someone living alone who was 65 years old or older.

The median age in the city was 44.0 years. 18.5% of the residents were under the age of 20; 6.8% were between the ages of 20 and 24; 25.3% were from 25 and 44; 28.1% were from 45 and 64; and 21.2% were 65 years of age or older. The gender makeup of the city was 55.5% male and 44.5% female.

=== 2010 census ===
As of the census of 2010, there were 185 people, 72 households, and 52 families residing in the city. The population density was 220.2 inhabitants per square mile (85.0/km^{2}). There were 76 housing units at an average density of 90.5 per square mile (34.9/km^{2}). The racial makeup of the city was 98.4% White, 0.5% Asian, and 1.1% from other races. Hispanic or Latino of any race were 1.1% of the population.

There were 72 households, of which 31.9% had children under the age of 18 living with them, 54.2% were married couples living together, 12.5% had a female householder with no husband present, 5.6% had a male householder with no wife present, and 27.8% were non-families. 20.8% of all households were made up of individuals, and 9.7% had someone living alone who was 65 years of age or older. The average household size was 2.57 and the average family size was 3.02.

The median age in the city was 37.8 years. 24.9% of residents were under the age of 18; 9.2% were between the ages of 18 and 24; 23.8% were from 25 to 44; 28.1% were from 45 to 64; and 14.1% were 65 years of age or older. The gender makeup of the city was 53.0% male and 47.0% female.

=== 2000 census ===
As of the census of 2000, there were 202 people, 74 households, and 58 families residing in the city. The population density was 240.9 inhabitants per square mile (93.0/km^{2}). There were 83 housing units at an average density of 99.0 per square mile (38.2/km^{2}). The racial makeup of the city was 97.52% White, 1.49% Asian, and 0.99% from two or more races.

There were 74 households, out of which 36.5% had children under the age of 18 living with them, 75.7% were married couples living together, 2.7% had a female householder with no husband present, and 20.3% were non-families. 16.2% of all households were made up of individuals, and 6.8% had someone living alone who was 65 years of age or older. The average household size was 2.73 and the average family size was 3.10.

In the city, the population was spread out, with 29.2% under the age of 18, 4.0% from 18 to 24, 30.2% from 25 to 44, 25.2% from 45 to 64, and 11.4% who were 65 years of age or older. The median age was 39 years. For every 100 females, there were 92.4 males. For every 100 females age 18 and over, there were 110.3 males.

The median income for a household in the city was $44,167, and the median income for a family was $43,750. Males had a median income of $26,786 versus $20,515 for females. The per capita income for the city was $13,344. About 7.7% of families and 4.5% of the population were below the poverty line, including 4.4% of those under the age of eighteen and none of those 65 or over.

== Education ==
Dickens is within the Spencer Community School District. It was previously in the South Clay Community School District; on July 1, 2010, that district dissolved, with a portion going to the Spencer district.
