= Peterson, Iowa =

Peterson,
- City
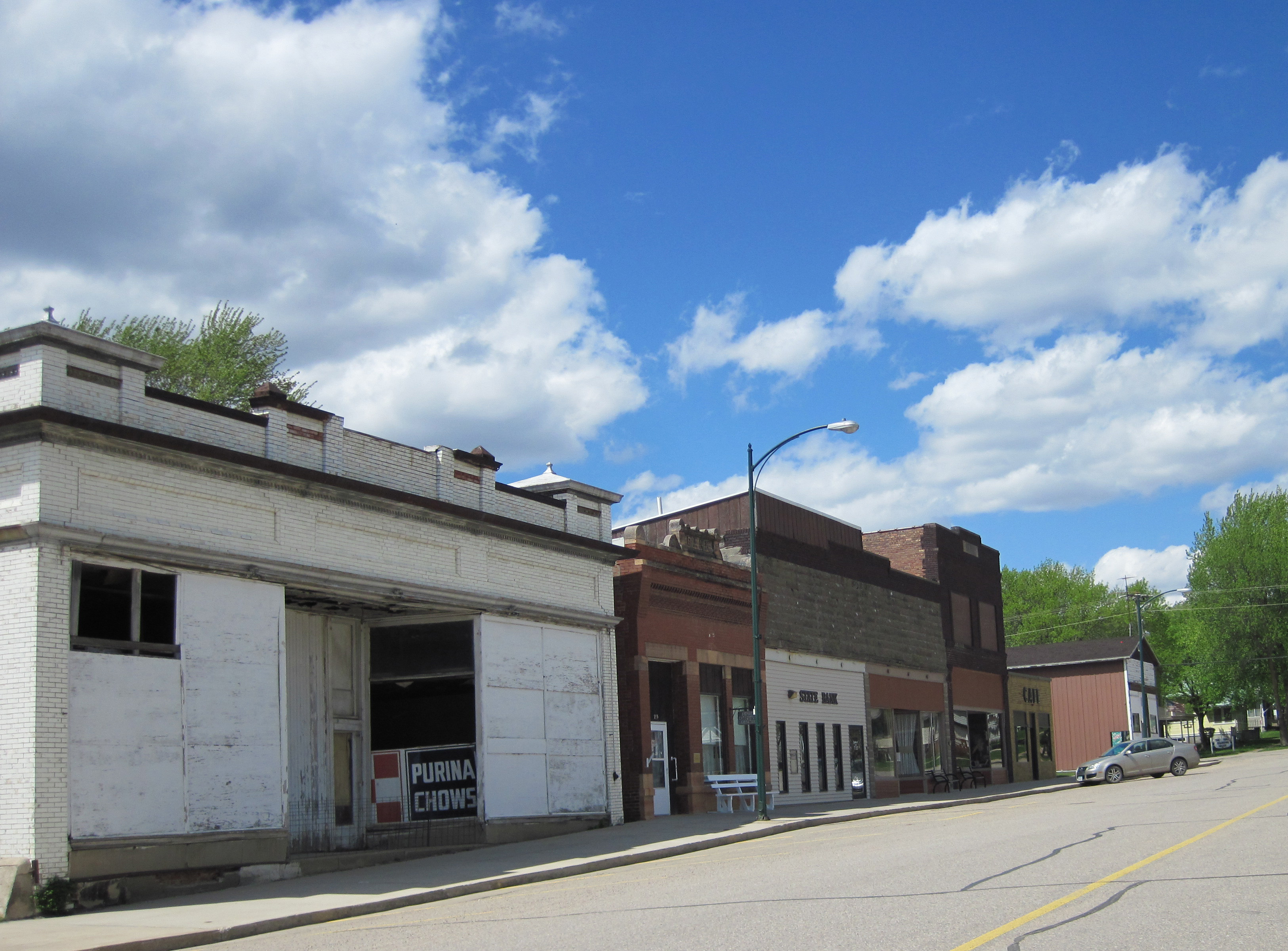
- Downtown Peterson

- Location of Peterson, Iowa
- Coordinates: 42°55′04″N 95°20′35″W
- Country: US
- State: Iowa
- County: Clay

Area
  - Total: 0.54 sq mi (1.40 km^{2})
  - Land: 0.52 sq mi (1.34 km^{2})
  - Water: 0.023 sq mi (0.06 km^{2})
- Elevation: 1,253 ft (382 m)

Population (2020)
  - Total: 322
  - Density: 620.2/sq mi (239.47/km^{2})
- Time zone: UTC-6 (Central (CST))
  - Summer (DST): UTC-5 (CDT)
- ZIP code: 51047
- Area code: 712
- FIPS code: 19-62625
- GNIS feature ID: 2396195

Peterson is a city in Clay County, Iowa, United States. The population was 322 in the 2020 census, a decline from 372 people in 2000.

== History ==
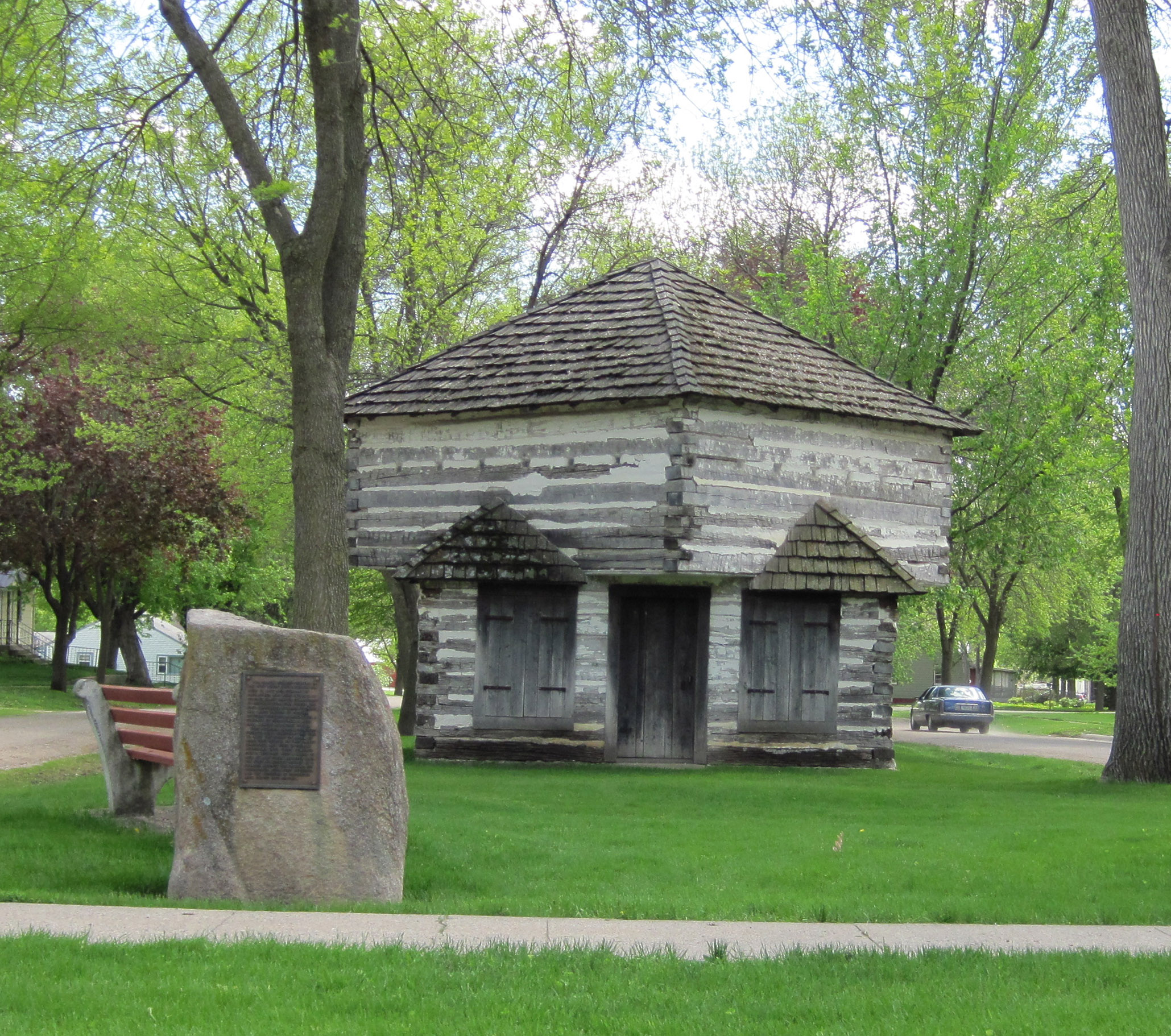
Blockhouse built as part of Fort Peterson, 1862.

The first settlement was made at Peterson in 1856. In 1862, a fort was built in Peterson by settlers to defend against anticipated Dakota attacks during the Dakota War, though the fort was never attacked. The blockhouse from this fort still stands near its original location at the corner of Second and Park.

Peterson was platted in 1881 when the railroad was extended to that point. The city was named for Adlie Peterson, an early settler.

== Geography ==
Peterson is situated near the Little Sioux River.

According to the United States Census Bureau, the city has a total area of 0.31 square miles (0.80 km^{2}), all land.

== Demographics ==
Historical population
Census	Pop.	Note	%±
1870	44		—
1890	371		—
1900	521		40.4%
1910	480		−7.9%
1920	580		20.8%
1930	598		3.1%
1940	603		0.8%
1950	589		−2.3%
1960	565		−4.1%
1970	469		−17.0%
1980	470		0.2%
1990	390		−17.0%
2000	372		−4.6%
2010	334		−10.2%
2020	322		−3.6%
U.S. Decennial Census

=== 2020 census ===
As of the census of 2020, there were 322 people, 159 households, and 92 families residing in the city. The population density was 620.2 inhabitants per square mile (239.5/km^{2}). There were 186 housing units at an average density of 358.3 per square mile (138.3/km^{2}). The racial makeup of the city was 96.0% White, 0.0% Black or African American, 0.3% Native American, 0.0% Asian, 0.0% Pacific Islander, 0.0% from other races and 3.7% from two or more races. Hispanic or Latino persons of any race comprised 2.5% of the population.

Of the 159 households, 23.3% of which had children under the age of 18 living with them, 49.1% were married couples living together, 6.3% were cohabitating couples, 27.0% had a female householder with no spouse or partner present and 17.6% had a male householder with no spouse or partner present. 42.1% of all households were non-families. 38.4% of all households were made up of individuals, 21.4% had someone living alone who was 65 years old or older.

The median age in the city was 45.3 years. 22.0% of the residents were under the age of 20; 5.0% were between the ages of 20 and 24; 22.7% were from 25 and 44; 27.0% were from 45 and 64; and 23.3% were 65 years of age or older. The gender makeup of the city was 49.1% male and 50.9% female.

=== 2010 census ===
As of the census of 2010, there were 334 people, 156 households, and 95 families residing in the city. The population density was 1,077.4 inhabitants per square mile (416.0/km^{2}). There were 196 housing units at an average density of 632.3 per square mile (244.1/km^{2}). The racial makeup of the city was 99.4% White and 0.6% from two or more races. Hispanic or Latino of any race were 2.1% of the population.

There were 156 households, of which 24.4% had children under the age of 18 living with them, 48.1% were married couples living together, 7.7% had a female householder with no husband present, 5.1% had a male householder with no wife present, and 39.1% were non-families. 37.2% of all households were made up of individuals, and 25% had someone living alone who was 65 years of age or older. The average household size was 2.14 and the average family size was 2.78.

The median age in the city was 50.5 years. 19.5% of residents were under the age of 18; 4.8% were between the ages of 18 and 24; 18.6% were from 25 to 44; 30.9% were from 45 to 64; and 26.3% were 65 years of age or older. The gender makeup of the city was 47.9% male and 52.1% female.

=== 2000 census ===
As of the census of 2000, there were 372 people, 181 households, and 106 families residing in the city. The population density was 1,208.6 inhabitants per square mile (466.6/km^{2}). There were 200 housing units at an average density of 649.8 per square mile (250.9/km^{2}). The racial makeup of the city was 100.00% White. Hispanic or Latino of any race were 1.08% of the population.

There were 181 households, out of which 22.1% had children under the age of 18 living with them, 52.5% were married couples living together, 5.0% had a female householder with no husband present, and 40.9% were non-families. 37.6% of all households were made up of individuals, and 25.4% had someone living alone who was 65 years of age or older. The average household size was 2.06 and the average family size was 2.68.

In the city, the population was spread out, with 19.1% under the age of 18, 6.5% from 18 to 24, 21.2% from 25 to 44, 22.3% from 45 to 64, and 30.9% who were 65 years of age or older. The median age was 46 years. For every 100 females, there were 96.8 males. For every 100 females age 18 and over, there were 92.9 males.

The median income for a household in the city was $30,000, and the median income for a family was $35,577. Males had a median income of $28,500 versus $20,179 for females. The per capita income for the city was $16,932. About 2.9% of families and 10.3% of the population were below the poverty line, including 7.7% of those under age 18 and 6.0% of those age 65 or over.

== Media ==
The Peterson Patriot has been in print since 1880.

== Education ==
Sioux Central Community School District serves the community.

Previously it was served by the Peterson School District. In the early 1960s it consolidated with the Linn Grove School District to form the Sioux Valley School District. On July 1, 1993, the Sioux Valley district merged with the Sioux Rapids-Rembrandt School District to form the Sioux Central district.
