= Clay County, Iowa =

County in Iowa, United States

- County
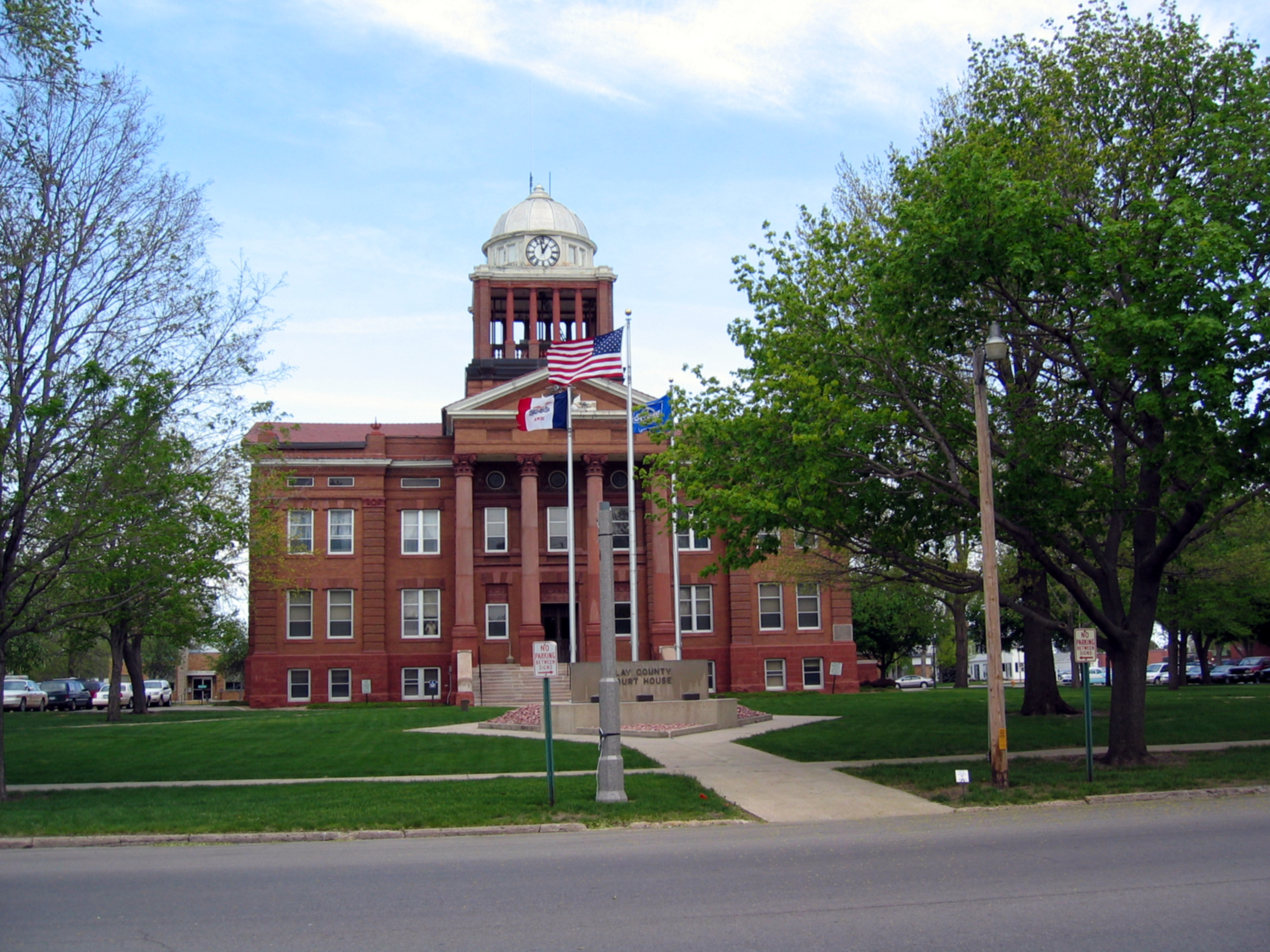
- Clay County Courthouse

- Location within the U.S. state of Iowa
- Coordinates: 43°04′51″N 95°08′58″W
- Country: United States
- State: Iowa
- Founded: 1851
- Named for: Henry Clay Jr.
- Seat: Spencer
- Largest city: Spencer

Area
  - Total: 573 sq mi (1,480 km^{2})
  - Land: 567 sq mi (1,470 km^{2})
  - Water: 5.4 sq mi (14 km^{2}) 0.9%

Population (2020)
  - Total: 16,384
  - Estimate (2025): 16,202 ▼
  - Density: 28.9/sq mi (11.2/km^{2})
- Time zone: UTC−6 (Central)
  - Summer (DST): UTC−5 (CDT)
- Congressional district: 4th
- Website: claycounty.iowa.gov
- Iowa county number 21

Clay County is a county located in the U.S. state of Iowa. As of the 2020 census, the population was 16,384. Its county seat is Spencer. Its name is in honor of Henry Clay Jr., a colonel who died in action in the Mexican–American War, and son of Henry Clay, famous American statesman from Kentucky. Clay County comprises the Spencer, IA Micropolitan Statistical Area. Clay County holds the annual Clay County Fair. The first newspaper in Clay County was the Peterson Patriot which started publication in 1880.

== Geography ==
According to the United States Census Bureau, the county has a total area of 573 square miles (1,480 km^{2}), of which 567 square miles (1,470 km^{2}) is land and 5.4 square miles (14 km^{2}) (0.9%) is water. Clay County is home to the large Barringer Slough wetland.

=== Major highways ===
- U.S. Highway 18
- U.S. Highway 71
- Iowa Highway 10

=== Airport ===
The Spencer Municipal Airport is located three miles (4.8 km) northwest of the business district of Spencer. It provides service to the county and surrounding communities.

=== Adjacent counties ===
- Dickinson County (north)
- Palo Alto County (east)
- Buena Vista County (south)
- O'Brien County (west)

== Demographics ==
Historical population
Census	Pop.	Note	%±
1860	52		—
1870	1,523		2,828.8%
1880	4,248		178.9%
1890	9,309		119.1%
1900	13,401		44.0%
1910	12,766		−4.7%
1920	15,660		22.7%
1930	16,107		2.9%
1940	17,762		10.3%
1950	18,103		1.9%
1960	18,504		2.2%
1970	18,464		−0.2%
1980	19,576		6.0%
1990	17,585		−10.2%
2000	17,372		−1.2%
2010	16,667		−4.1%
2020	16,384		−1.7%
2025 (est.)	16,202	▼	−1.1%
U.S. Decennial Census; 1790-1960 1900-1990; 1990-2000 2010-2018

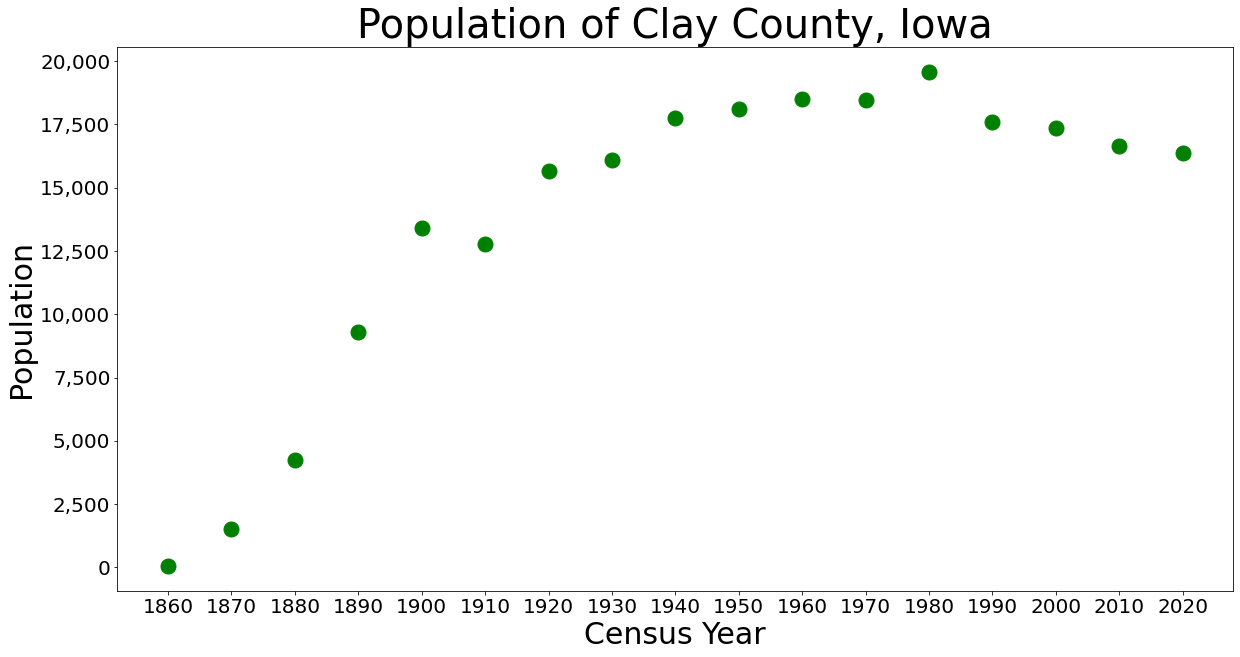
Population of Clay County from US census data

=== 2020 census ===
As of the 2020 census, the county had a population of 16,384 and a population density of 28.7/sq mi (11.1/km^{2}). 96.20% of the population reported being of one race. The median age was 42.8 years, 22.5% of residents were under the age of 18, and 22.0% of residents were 65 years of age or older. For every 100 females there were 97.3 males, and for every 100 females age 18 and over there were 96.3 males age 18 and over.

There were 8,109 housing units, of which 7,222 were occupied, leaving a 10.9% vacancy rate. Among occupied units, 71.8% were owner-occupied and 28.2% were renter-occupied; the homeowner and rental vacancy rates were 1.9% and 12.0%, respectively.

Of the 7,222 households, 26.1% had children under the age of 18 living with them. Of all households, 48.2% were married-couple households, 20.2% were households with a male householder and no spouse or partner present, and 24.9% were households with a female householder and no spouse or partner present. About 33.9% of all households were made up of individuals and 15.5% had someone living alone who was 65 years of age or older.

The racial makeup of the county was 93.0% White, 0.6% Black or African American, 0.3% American Indian and Alaska Native, 0.6% Asian, <0.1% Native Hawaiian and Pacific Islander, 1.6% from some other race, and 3.8% from two or more races. Hispanic or Latino residents of any race comprised 4.3% of the population.

Clay County Racial Composition
Race	Number	Percent
White (NH)	15,025	92.80%
Black or African American (NH)	99	0.60%
Native American (NH)	37	0.23%
Asian (NH)	105	0.64%
Pacific Islander (NH)	2	0.01%
Other/Mixed (NH)	412	2.51%
Hispanic or Latino	704	4.30%

66.9% of residents lived in urban areas, while 33.1% lived in rural areas.

=== 2010 census ===
The 2010 census recorded a population of 16,667 in the county, with a population density of 29.3/sq mi (11.3/km^{2}). There were 8,062 housing units, of which 7,282 were occupied.

=== 2000 census ===
As of the census of 2000, there were 17,372 people, 7,259 households, and 4,776 families residing in the county. The population density was 30 inhabitants per square mile (12/km^{2}). There were 7,828 housing units at an average density of 14 per square mile (5.4/km^{2}). The racial makeup of the county was 98.08% White, 0.17% Black or African American, 0.10% Native American, 0.82% Asian, 0.03% Pacific Islander, 0.25% from other races, and 0.55% from two or more races. 1.13% of the population were Hispanic or Latino of any race.

There were 7,259 households, out of which 30.70% had children under the age of 18 living with them, 55.60% were married couples living together, 6.80% had a female householder with no husband present, and 34.20% were non-families. 29.80% of all households were made up of individuals, and 13.70% had someone living alone who was 65 years of age or older. The average household size was 2.35 and the average family size was 2.92.

In the county, the population was spread out, with 24.70% under the age of 18, 8.00% from 18 to 24, 26.90% from 25 to 44, 22.50% from 45 to 64, and 18.00% who were 65 years of age or older. The median age was 39 years. For every 100 females, there were 93.30 males. For every 100 females age 18 and over, there were 90.90 males.

The median income for a household in the county was $35,799, and the median income for a family was $42,769. Males had a median income of $30,163 versus $21,068 for females. The per capita income for the county was $19,451. About 6.30% of families and 8.20% of the population were below the poverty line, including 11.10% of those under age 18 and 8.10% of those age 65 or over.

== Economy ==
The county has been based on farming. The 1980s farm crisis caused some families to have to give up their farms, and farms have been merged to industrial scale. The population has declined since 1980.

At one point Great Lakes Airlines was headquartered in Summit Township, Clay County.

== Communities ==
=== Cities ===
- Dickens
- Everly
- Fostoria
- Gillett Grove
- Greenville
- Peterson
- Rossie
- Royal
- Spencer
- Webb

=== Townships ===
Clay County is divided into these townships:

- Clay
- Douglas
- Freeman
- Garfield
- Gillett Grove
- Herdland
- Lake
- Lincoln
- Logan
- Lone Tree
- Meadow
- Peterson
- Riverton
- Sioux
- Summit
- Waterford

=== Population ranking ===
The population ranking of the following table is based on the 2020 United States census of Clay County. † county seat

Rank	City/Town/etc.	Municipal type	Population (2020 Census)
1	† Spencer	City	11,325
2	Everly	City	576
3	Royal	City	382
4	Peterson	City	324
5	Fostoria	City	232
6	Dickens	City	149
7	Webb	City	142
8	Greenville	City	69
9	Rossie	City	48
10	Gillett Grove	City	32

== Politics ==
For most of its history, Clay County has primarily voted for Republican party candidates in presidential elections. Exceptions to this include Bull Moose candidate & former president Theodore Roosevelt winning a majority in 1912, the longest Democratic streak in its history when Franklin D. Roosevelt & Harry S. Truman were on the ballot from 1932 to 1948, Lyndon B. Johnson winning in a landslide statewide & nationally in 1964, Michael Dukakis getting a huge boost statewide thanks to the Midwest farm crisis in 1988, & Bill Clinton benefiting from Ross Perot gaining significant minorities of the county's vote in 1992 & 1996. The level of Republican support has increased significantly in recent years, with Hillary Clinton posting the worst performance since 1952 when Adlai Stevenson won an identical percentage of the county's votes at 26.1%.

United States presidential election results for Clay County, Iowa
Year	Republican		Democratic		Third party(ies)	
Year	No.	%	No.	%	No.	%
1896	1,880	65.99%	933	32.75%	36	1.26%
1900	2,292	72.76%	781	24.79%	77	2.44%
1904	2,154	78.70%	487	17.79%	96	3.51%
1908	1,921	69.68%	778	28.22%	58	2.10%
1912	679	24.04%	707	25.04%	1,438	50.92%
1916	1,649	55.41%	1,234	41.47%	93	3.13%
1920	4,471	80.05%	1,001	17.92%	113	2.02%
1924	3,549	60.95%	378	6.49%	1,896	32.56%
1928	3,986	65.51%	2,064	33.92%	35	0.58%
1932	2,599	38.40%	3,944	58.27%	226	3.34%
1936	2,774	36.57%	4,691	61.84%	121	1.60%
1940	3,673	45.77%	4,328	53.93%	24	0.30%
1944	3,055	45.43%	3,639	54.12%	30	0.45%
1948	3,036	43.61%	3,649	52.42%	276	3.96%
1952	6,271	72.57%	2,258	26.13%	112	1.30%
1956	5,107	62.36%	2,970	36.26%	113	1.38%
1960	5,165	60.03%	3,437	39.95%	2	0.02%
1964	2,999	38.70%	4,631	59.76%	119	1.54%
1968	4,325	56.70%	2,840	37.23%	463	6.07%
1972	4,564	59.30%	2,887	37.51%	245	3.18%
1976	4,548	53.51%	3,776	44.42%	176	2.07%
1980	4,479	51.11%	3,179	36.27%	1,106	12.62%
1984	4,450	53.51%	3,774	45.38%	92	1.11%
1988	3,641	46.26%	4,173	53.02%	56	0.71%
1992	3,011	35.93%	3,346	39.93%	2,023	24.14%
1996	3,129	40.88%	3,659	47.80%	867	11.33%
2000	3,992	52.68%	3,294	43.47%	292	3.85%
2004	4,898	57.03%	3,547	41.30%	143	1.67%
2008	4,355	51.83%	3,925	46.72%	122	1.45%
2012	4,951	58.23%	3,385	39.81%	166	1.95%
2016	5,877	68.20%	2,249	26.10%	491	5.70%
2020	6,137	68.42%	2,662	29.68%	170	1.90%
2024	6,047	70.80%	2,367	27.71%	127	1.49%

== See also ==
- National Register of Historic Places listings in Clay County, Iowa
- Clay County Courthouse (Iowa)
