= List of botanical gardens and arboretums in Iowa =

This list of botanical gardens and arboretums in Iowa is intended to include all significant botanical gardens and arboretums in the U.S. state of Iowa

Name	Image	Affiliation	City
Bickelhaupt Arboretum			Clinton
Arie den Boer Arboretum			Des Moines
Brenton Arboretum			Dallas Center
Buxton Park Arboretum			Indianola
Cedar Valley Arboretum & Botanic Gardens			Waterloo
Crapo Park			Burlington
Dubuque Arboretum and Botanical Gardens			Dubuque
Forest Park Museum and Arboretum			Perry
Frontier Organic Research Farm Botanical Garden			Norway
Greater Des Moines Botanical Garden			Des Moines
Iowa Arboretum			Madrid
Lilac Arboretum and Children's Forest			Des Moines
Muscatine Arboretum			Muscatine
Newton Arboretum and Botanical Gardens			Newton
Reiman Gardens		Iowa State University	Ames
Stampe Lilac Garden			Davenport
University of Northern Iowa Teaching and Research Greenhouse		University of Northern Iowa	Cedar Falls
Vander Veer Botanical Park			Davenport

== See also ==
- List of botanical gardens and arboretums in the United States
