= List of cities in Iowa =

Map of the United States with Iowa highlighted

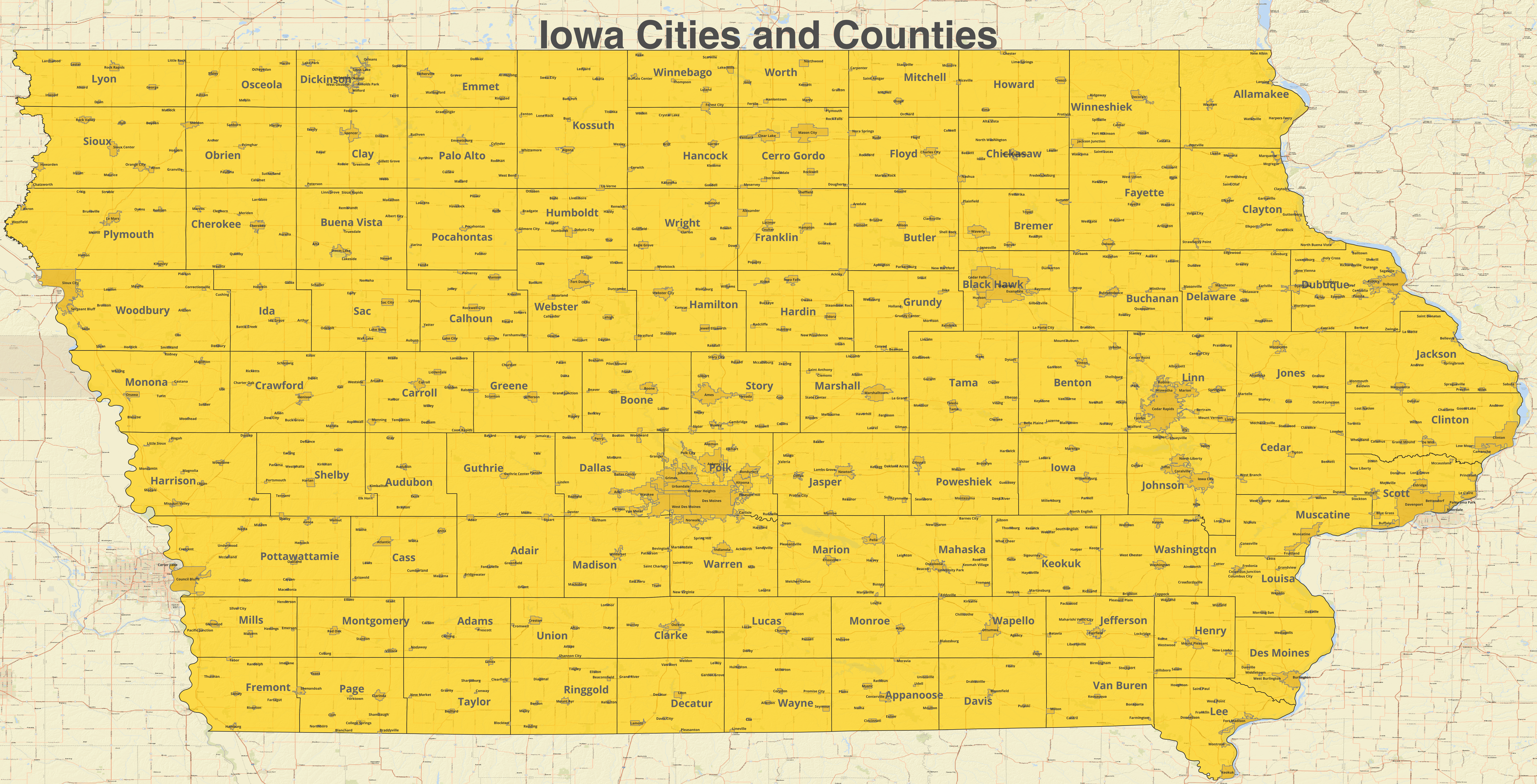
Iowa Cities and Counties

Iowa is a state located in the Midwestern United States. As of 2010, there are 943 incorporated cities in the U.S. state of Iowa. According to the 2020 United States census, Iowa has 3,190,369 inhabitants and 55,857.13 square miles (144,669.3 km^{2}) of land.

Iowa is divided into 99 counties and has 943 cities. Every incorporated place in Iowa is called a "city", regardless of population. Incorporated cities can choose one of six forms of municipal government that differ primarily on how the legislative and administrative responsibilities are separated: mayor-council, mayor-council with an appointed manager, council-manager-at-large, commission, council-manager-ward, home rule charter or special charter. Most operate as mayor–council.

According to the 2020 Census, 2,014,831 of Iowa's 3,190,369 residents lived in urban areas, accounting for 63.1% of the population. The first city to incorporate was Farmington on January 11, 1841, while the most recent was Maharishi Vedic City on July 25, 2001. The largest city by population and by land area is Des Moines with 214,133 residents and 90.65 square miles (234.8 km^{2}). The smallest city by population is Le Roy with 11 residents.

== Most populous cities ==
2025 Rank	Population 2025 Estimate	Population 2020 Census	City	County	Skyline	Description
1	212,086	214,133	Des Moines	Polk, Warren		Des Moines is a major center for the insurance industry and also has a sizable financial services and publishing business base. In fact, Des Moines was credited with the "number one spot for U.S. insurance companies" in a Business Wire article. The city is the headquarters for the Principal Financial Group, the Meredith Corporation, Ruan Transportation, EMC Insurance Companies, and Wellmark Blue Cross Blue Shield. Forbes magazine ranked Des Moines as the "Best Place for Business" in 2010.
2	137,935	137,710	Cedar Rapids	Linn		Cedar Rapids is a major center for agricultural processing and food production in the U.S., with the largest concentration of cereal manufacturers in the world. It is also home to a sizeable technology and aerospace industry, anchored by the presence of Rockwell Aerospace (now part of Raytheon). Cedar Rapids is home to the Cedar Rapids Museum of Art, the National Czech & Slovak Museum & Library, the Paramount Theatre, Theatre Cedar Rapids, and the Iowa Cultural Corridor Alliance. It is also home to the Cedar Rapids Kernels (Class A minor league baseball club affiliated with the Minnesota Twins), the Cedar Rapids RoughRiders (hockey), and the Cedar Rapids Titans (IFL football).
3	100,358	101,724	Davenport	Scott		Located approximately halfway between Chicago and Des Moines, Davenport is on the border of Iowa and Illinois within the area known as the Quad Cities. The city is prone to occasional flooding due to its location on the Mississippi River. There are two main universities: Saint Ambrose University and Palmer College of Chiropractic, which is where the first chiropractic adjustment took place. The city has a Class A minor league baseball team, the Quad Cities River Bandits and hosts the Quad City Air Show, Iowa's largest airshow.
4	86,356	85,797	Sioux City	Woodbury, Plymouth		Sioux City is at the navigational head of the Missouri River, about 95 miles north of the Omaha-Council Bluffs metropolitan area. Sioux City and the surrounding areas of northwestern Iowa, northeastern Nebraska and southeastern South Dakota are sometimes referred to as Siouxland, especially by the local media. The city is home to several cultural points of interest including the Sioux City Public Museum, Sioux City Art Center and Sergeant Floyd Monument, which is a National Historical Landmark.
5	77,833	67,887	Ankeny	Polk		A 2015 Special Census count conducted from December 2014 through March 2015 has the population at 54,598, a population growth of nearly 20% in the past 5 years. The population was 45,562 in the 2010 census, an increase of 68% from the 27,117 population in the 2000 census. It is part of the Des Moines–West Des Moines Metropolitan Statistical Area.
6	76,229	74,828	Iowa City	Johnson		Iowa City was the second capital of the Iowa Territory and the first capital city of the State of Iowa. The Old Capitol building is a National Historic Landmark, and it is a tourist attraction in the center of the campus of the University of Iowa, as well as being an integral part of the university. The University of Iowa Art Museum and Plum Grove, the home of the first Governor of Iowa, are other landmarks. In 2008, Forbes magazine named Iowa City the second-best small metropolitan area for doing business in the United States.
7	74,224	68,723	West Des Moines	Polk, Warren, Dallas		The West Des Moines area used to be home to the Sac and Fox tribes. West Des Moines is the third-largest city in the Des Moines metropolitan area and the sixth-largest city in Iowa. It ranked 94th in Money magazine's list of the "100 Best Places to Live and Launch" in 2008. It is one of Iowa's largest and wealthiest cities and one of Des Moines's richest suburbs.
8	68,220	66,427	Ames	Story		Ames is the home of the Iowa State University, a public research institution, and Iowa State University College of Veterinary Medicine. Ames hosts a national site for the U.S. Department of Agriculture's Animal and Plant Health and Inspection Service (APHIS) which comprises the National Veterinary Services Laboratories (NVSL) and the Center for Veterinary Biologics (CVB), and the Agricultural Research Service's National Animal Disease Center (NADC).
9	66,919	67,314	Waterloo	Black Hawk		The name "Waterloo" supplanted the original name, "Prairie Rapids Crossing" shortly after Charles Mullan petitioned for a post office in the town. Since the signed petition did not include the name of the proposed post office location, Mullan was charged with selecting the name when he submitted the petition. Tradition has it that as he flipped through a list of other post offices in the United States, he came upon the current name. The city is part of the Waterloo–Cedar Falls Metropolitan Statistical Area.
10	62,680	62,799	Council Bluffs	Pottawattamie		Council Bluffs, until 1852, was Kanesville—the historic starting point of the Mormon Trail and eventual northernmost anchor town of the other emigrant trails. It is the county seat of Pottawattamie County, and is on the east bank of the Missouri River across from what is now the much larger city of Omaha, Nebraska.
11	59,148	59,667	Dubuque	Dubuque		The city lies at the junction of three states: Iowa, Illinois, and Wisconsin, a region locally known as the Tri-State Area. It serves as the main commercial, industrial, educational, and cultural center for the area. Geographically, it is part of the Driftless Area, a portion of North America that escaped all three phases of the Wisconsinian Glaciation. It is one of the few large cities in Iowa with hills, and is home to a large tourist industry, driven by the city's unique architecture, and river location. Also, it is home to five institutions of higher education, making it a center for culture and learning.
12	48,570	45,580	Urbandale	Polk, Dallas		As of the 2000 census, the city population was 29,072; a special census taken by the city in 2005 counted 35,904 residents and the United States Census Bureau estimated that 38,369 residents lived there in 2008. It is part of the Des Moines–West Des Moines Metropolitan Statistical Area.
13	42,732	41,535	Marion	Linn		Marion is part of the Cedar Rapids Metropolitan Statistical Area. The town was named after Francis Marion, a hero of the Revolutionary War. The site was selected in 1839 to be the first county seat of the newly organized Linn County. After years of debate over moving the county seat to Cedar Rapids, it was put to a vote in 1919. The vote was 9,960 in favor of moving the seat and 4,823 not in favor.
14	41,240	40,713	Cedar Falls	Black Hawk		Cedar Falls is home to one of Iowa's three public universities, the University of Northern Iowa. Cedar Falls was first settled in March 1845 by brothers-in-law William Sturgis and Erasmus D. Adams. Initially, the city was named Sturgis Falls. The city is part of the Waterloo–Cedar Falls Metropolitan Statistical Area.
15	40,710	39,102	Bettendorf	Scott		Bettendorf is the fourth largest city in the Quad Cities. The first modern-day riverboat casinos in the United States were launched in Bettendorf on April 1, 1991, by local businessman Bernard Goldstein. He went on to found the Isle of Capri Casinos. Goldstein and his family members also operate Alter Companies, which is a scrap metal, barge and towboat company operating on the river waterfront. The Quad Cities Waterfront Convention Center opened by the casino and hotel in 2009. It is owned by the city and operated by the Isle of Capri.
16	34,890	23,940	Waukee	Dallas		Waukee is part of the Des Moines – West Des Moines Metropolitan Statistical Area. The population was 23,940 at the 2020 census; a fast growth has been measured since as it is estimated there were 34,420 people living in Waukee in 2024.
17	27,536	27,591	Marshalltown	Marshall		Marshalltown is the county seat of Marshall County.
18	26,853	27,338	Mason City	Cerro Gordo		Mason City is the county seat of Cerro Gordo County. Mason City has a very diverse employment base covering multiple sectors of the economy including manufacturing, health, financial services, technology, and education, with no one sector or employer dominating the market.
19	25,319	25,529	Ottumwa	Wapello		Ottumwa is located in the southeastern part of Iowa, and the city is split into northern and southern halves by the Des Moines River.
20	25,065	24,064	Johnston	Polk		Johnston is the location of the headquarters of Pioneer Hi-Bred Seeds, Iowa Public Television, and The Gardeners of America/Men's Garden Clubs of America. Also located here are the Camp Dodge Military Reservation as well as the Paul J. and Ida Trier House, a private residence designed by famous architect Frank Lloyd Wright.
21	24,837	24,871	Fort Dodge	Webster		Fort Dodge is a major commercial center for North Central and Northwest Iowa. It is located on U.S. Routes 20 and 169.
22	24,049	24,469	Clinton	Clinton		Clinton is the county seat of Clinton County.
23	23,960	22,318	Coralville	Johnson		Coralville is a suburb of Iowa City and part of the Iowa City Metropolitan Statistical Area. Coralville incorporated as a city in 1873. The city's name comes from the fossils that are found in the limestone along the Iowa River.
24	23,336	23,982	Burlington	Des Moines		Burlington is the county seat of Des Moines County. It was the first capital of the Iowa Territory and also one of the oldest towns in Iowa. Burlington is the home of Snake Alley, once labelled the crookedest alley in the world.
25	23,164	23,797	Muscatine	Muscatine		Muscatine is located along the Mississippi River. The name Muscatine is unique in that it is not used by any other city in the United States.
26	22,796	19,565	Altoona	Polk		Altoona is home of Adventureland, an amusement park, Prairie Meadows, a horse racing track and casino, and a Bass Pro Shops retail store, the first one in central Iowa. It is a suburb of Des Moines.
27	21,976	20,479	North Liberty	Johnson		The North Liberty area was first settled in 1838 by John Gaylor and Alonzo C. Dennison. It was originally known as "Big Bottom" or "North Bend" (in reference to its location near the bend of the Iowa River) by its earliest settlers and was later known as "Squash Bend" before the city was platted as North Liberty in 1857.
28	19,861	18,601	Clive	Dallas, Polk		Clive is known for its Greenbelt Trail system running through the entire community. Clive serves as the axis of the western Des Moines suburbs, being located between Urbandale, Waukee and West Des Moines along the major transportation corridors of I-35, I-80 and I-235. The City of Urbandale is to the north to northwest, the City of West Des Moines is to the southeast to southwest, the City of Waukee in Dallas County is to the west.
29	17,405	15,392	Grimes	Polk, Dallas		
30	16,829	15,833	Indianola	Warren		Indianola is the county seat of Warren County. Simpson College, a liberal arts college of the United Methodist Church, is in Indianola. It is also the home of the National Balloon Classic and National Balloon Museum.
31	15,741	15,760	Newton	Jasper		Newton, established in 1846 and incorporated in 1856, serves as the county seat of Jasper County. The community is located on Interstate 80, just 30 minutes east of the Des Moines metro. It is the home of Iowa Speedway, Maytag Dairy Farms, the historic Capitol II Theatre and Valle Drive-In. F.L. Maytag started the Maytag Corporation in Newton.

== List of cities ==
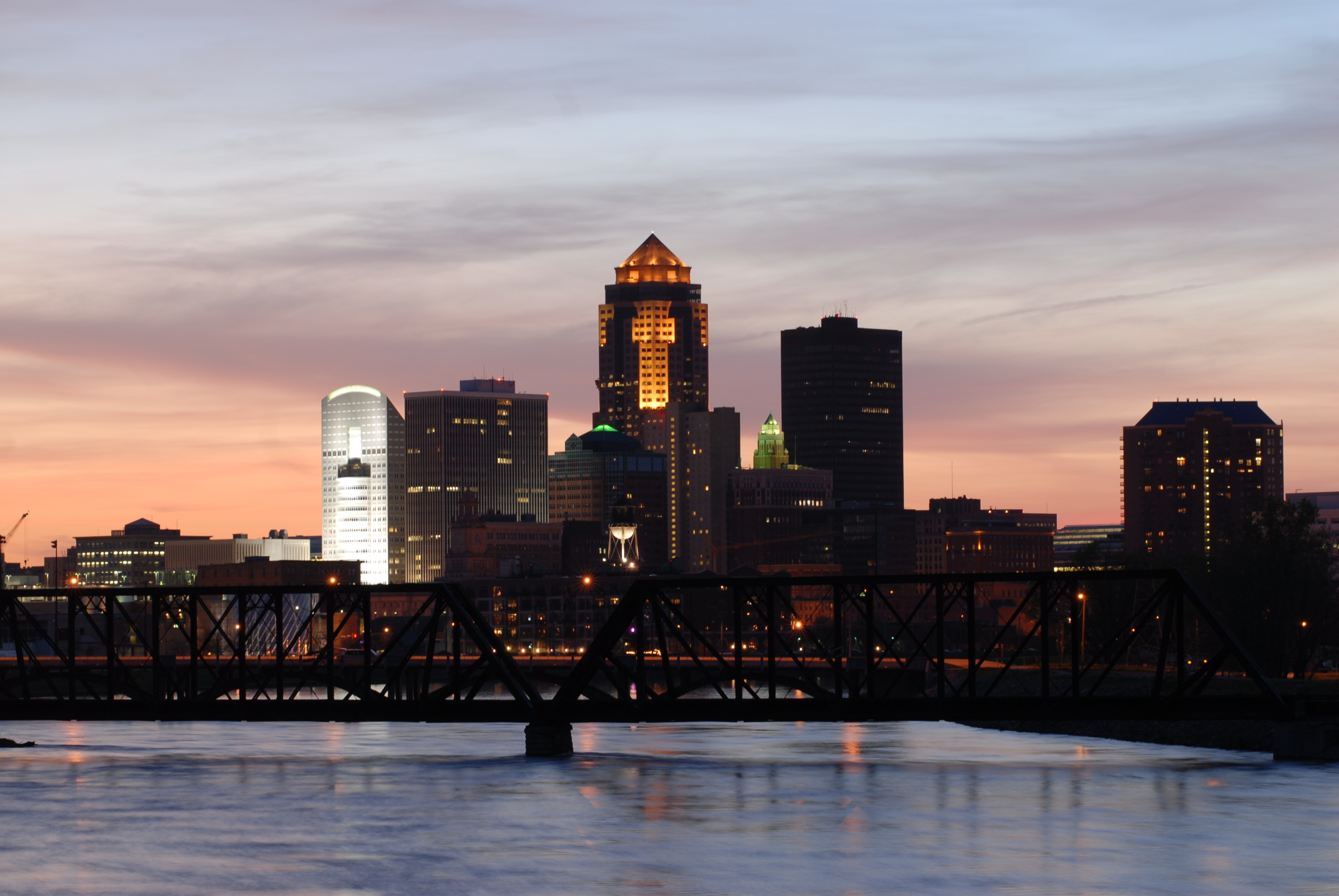
Des Moines, capital of Iowa

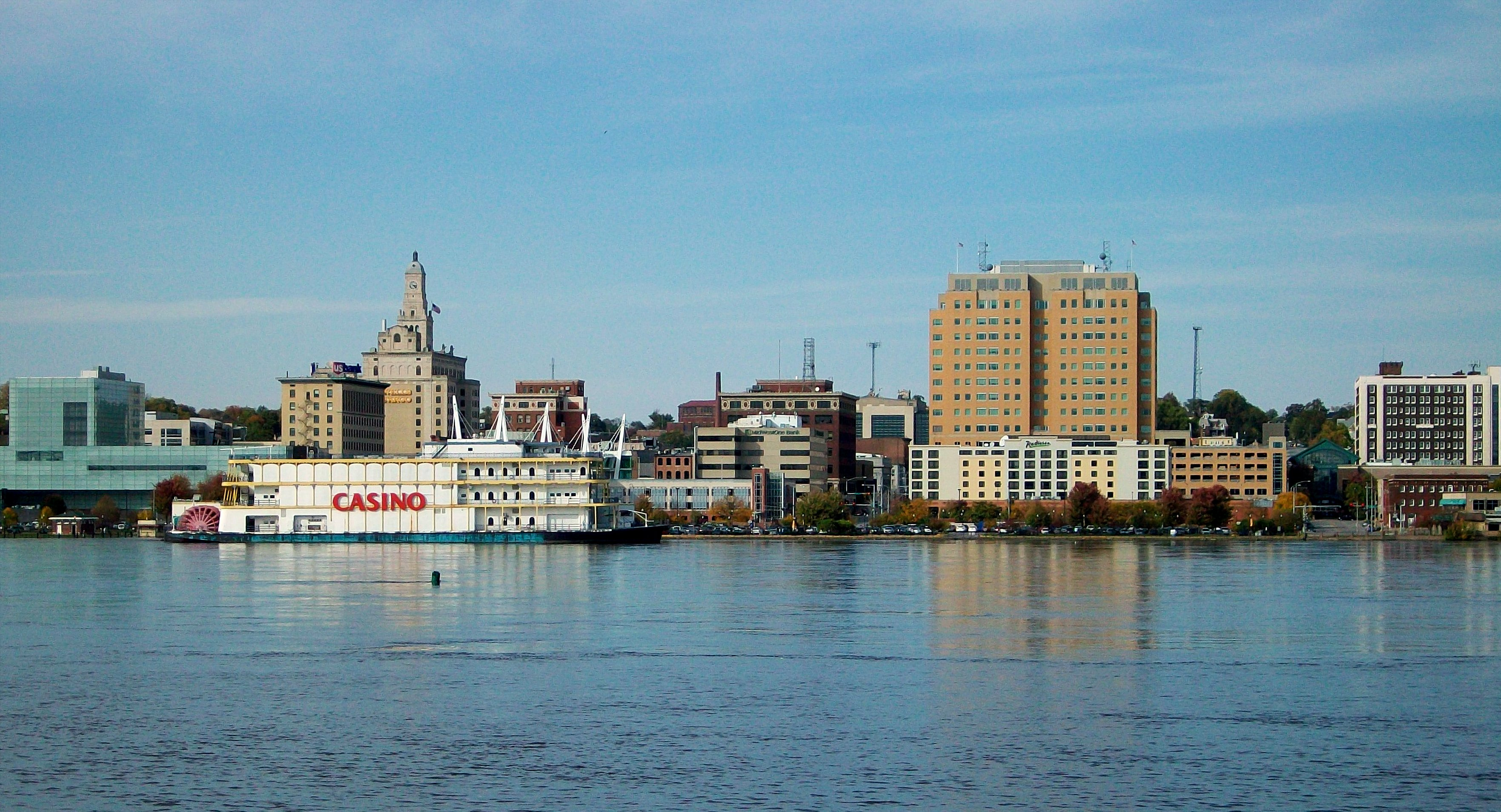
Davenport

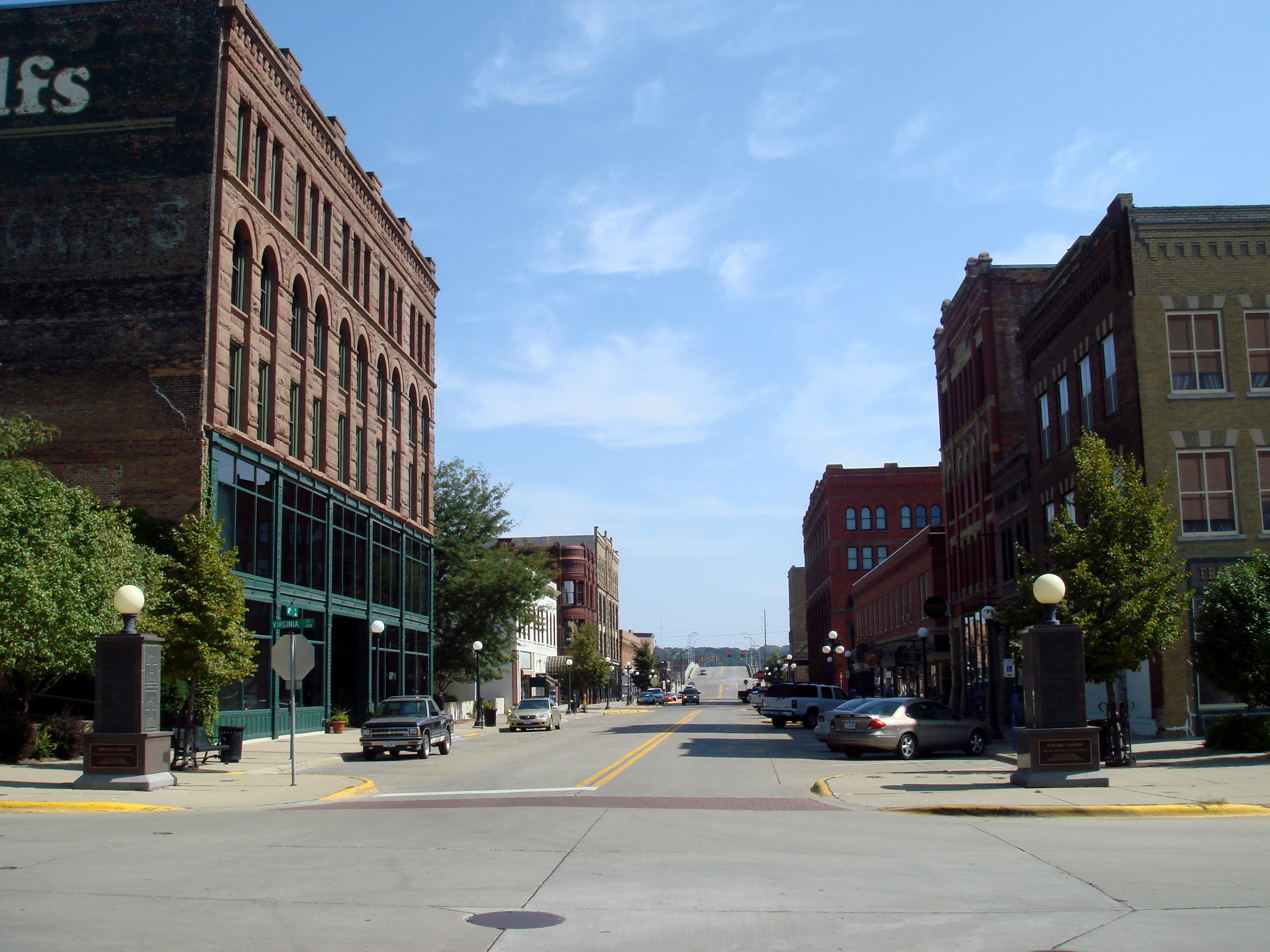
Sioux City

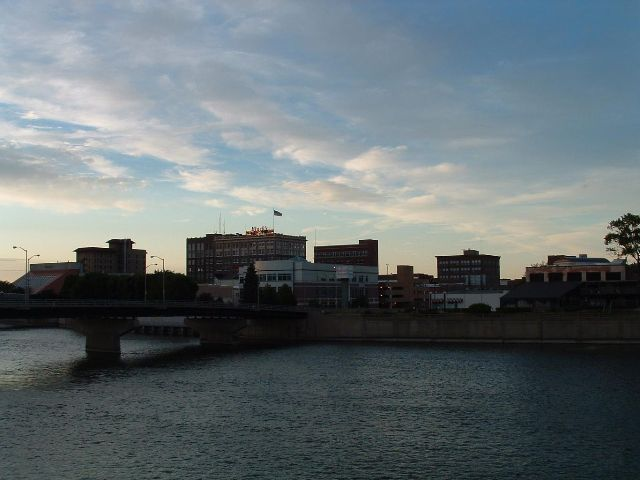
Waterloo

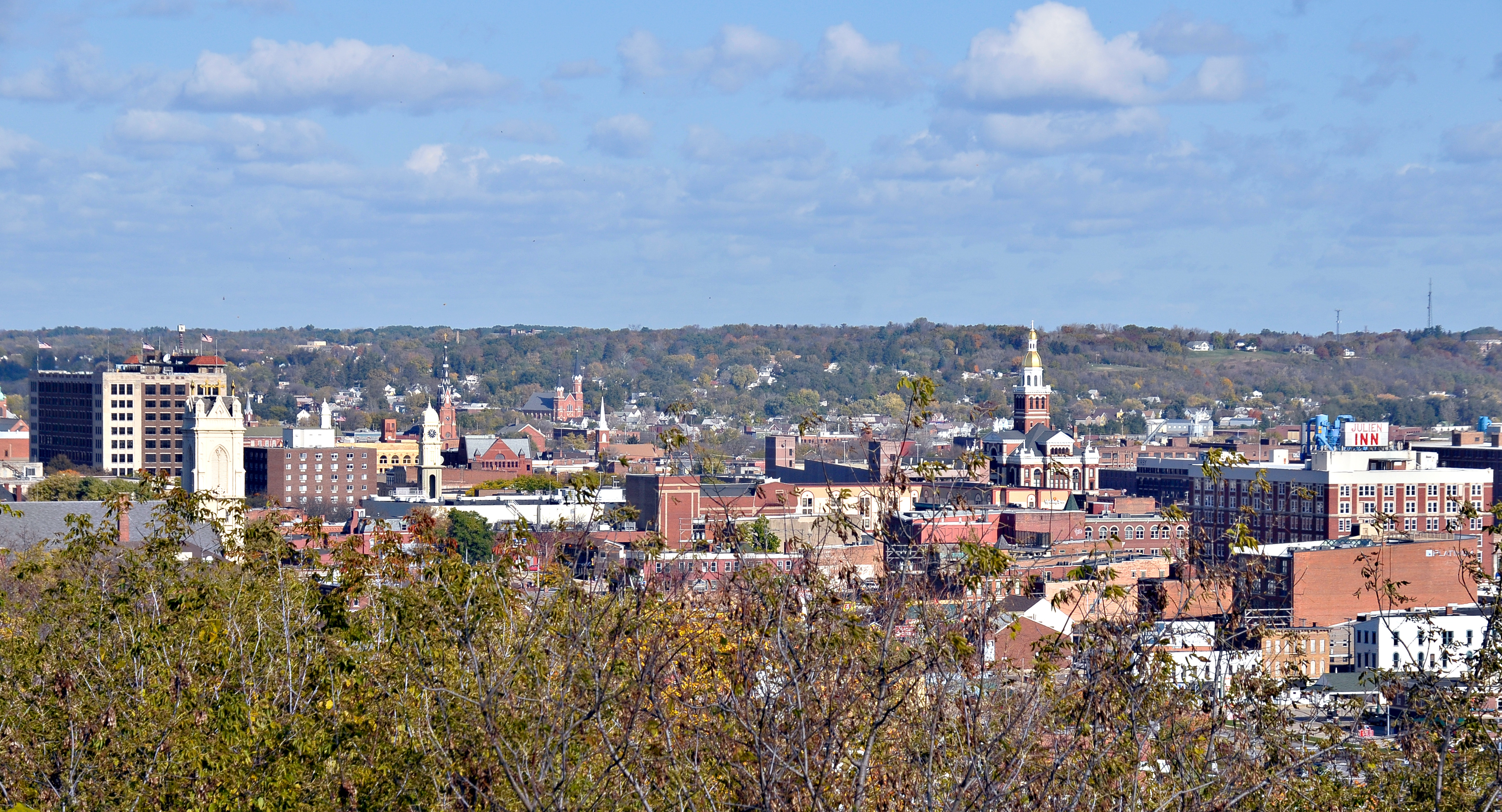
Dubuque

†	County seat
††	State capital and county seat

Name	Count(ies) (Note: For cities located in more than one county, the primary county (according to U.S. Census) is listed first.)	Population		Land area		Incorporated
Name	Count(ies)	2020	2010	sq mi	km^{2}	Incorporated
Ackley	Hardin; Franklin	1,599	1,589	2.45	6.3	August 28, 1869
Ackworth	Warren	115	83	0.29	0.75	May 9, 1881
Adair	Adair; Guthrie	791	781	2.2	5.7	February 23, 1884
Adel	Dallas	6,153	3,682	3.27	8.5	June 27, 1877
Afton	Union	874	845	0.99	2.6	November 30, 1868
Agency	Wapello	620	638	0.65	1.7	January 6, 1859
Ainsworth	Washington	511	567	0.38	0.98	June 18, 1892
Akron	Plymouth	1,558	1,486	1.22	3.2	September 7, 1882
Albert City	Buena Vista	677	699	0.54	1.4	December 10, 1900
Albia†	Monroe	3,721	3,766	3.19	8.3	January 28, 1857
Albion	Marshall	448	505	0.6	1.6	March 8, 1870
Alburnett	Linn	675	673	0.82	2.1	June 29, 1912
Alden	Hardin	763	787	1.71	4.4	February 11, 1879
Alexander	Franklin	164	175	4.27	11.1	March 25, 1902
Algona†	Kossuth	5,487	5,560	4.49	11.6	January 31, 1872
Alleman	Polk	423	432	2.7	7.0	May 18, 1973
Allerton	Wayne	430	501	1.14	3.0	October 1, 1874
Allison†	Butler	966	1,029	2.93	7.6	July 25, 1881
Alta	Buena Vista	2,087	1,883	1.07	2.8	November 11, 1878
Alta Vista	Chickasaw	227	266	0.76	2.0	September 18, 1894
Alton	Sioux	1,248	1,216	1.85	4.8	March 8, 1883
Altoona	Polk	19,565	14,541	9.35	24.2	March 11, 1876
Alvord	Lyon	206	196	0.28	0.73	September 26, 1892
Ames	Story	66,427	58,965	24.21	62.7	December 20, 1869
Anamosa†	Jones	5,450	5,533	2.6	6.7	December 17, 1867
Andover	Clinton	109	103	0.19	0.49	January 12, 1910
Andrew	Jackson	380	434	0.27	0.70	August 4, 1863
Anita	Cass	963	972	1.7	4.4	May 19, 1875
Ankeny	Polk	67,887	45,582	29.33	76.0	February 27, 1903
Anthon	Woodbury	545	565	0.71	1.8	July 25, 1890
Aplington	Butler	1,116	1,128	0.83	2.1	November 9, 1877
Arcadia	Carroll	525	484	0.98	2.5	November 3, 1881
Archer	O'Brien	117	131	0.09	0.23	May 5, 1902
Aredale	Butler	62	74	0.99	2.6	June 5, 1920
Arion	Crawford	97	108	0.47	1.2	May 31, 1894
Arispe	Union	96	100	0.52	1.3	October 21, 1904
Arlington	Fayette	419	429	1.05	2.7	April 30, 1985
Armstrong	Emmet	875	926	0.88	2.3	March 30, 1895
Arnolds Park	Dickinson	1,110	1,126	1.57	4.1	March 30, 1897
Arthur	Ida	222	206	0.15	0.39	April 21, 1897
Asbury	Dubuque	5,943	4,170	2.66	6.9	September 7, 1933
Ashton	Osceola	436	458	1.01	2.6	March 28, 1885
Aspinwall	Crawford	33	40	0.18	0.47	November 10, 1914
Atalissa	Muscatine	296	311	0.14	0.36	March 26, 1900
Atkins	Benton	2,056	1,670	1.09	2.8	May 15, 1917
Atlantic†	Cass	6,792	7,112	8.32	21.5	November 26, 1869
Auburn	Sac	265	322	0.5	1.3	January 10, 1887
Audubon†	Audubon	2,053	2,382	1.88	4.9	December 2, 1880
Aurelia	Cherokee	968	1,036	1.04	2.7	December 27, 1879
Aurora	Buchanan	169	185	0.57	1.5	August 26, 1899
Avoca	Pottawattamie	1,683	1,506	2.13	5.5	December 2, 1874
Ayrshire	Palo Alto	133	143	0.21	0.54	September 20, 1895
Badger	Webster	522	561	1.09	2.8	December 28, 1899
Bagley	Guthrie	233	303	0.31	0.80	June 16, 1891
Baldwin	Jackson	99	109	0.36	0.93	December 8, 1881
Balltown	Dubuque	79	68	0.09	0.23	July 22, 1933
Bancroft	Kossuth	699	732	0.55	1.4	February 16, 1884
Bankston	Dubuque	23	25	0.29	0.75	September 8, 1933
Barnes City	Mahaska; Poweshiek	156	176	0.59	1.5	April 20, 1899
Barnum	Webster	175	191	0.37	0.96	May 29, 1894
Bassett	Chickasaw	45	66	0.37	0.96	November 7, 1896
Batavia	Jefferson	430	499	0.6	1.6	January 6, 1868
Battle Creek	Ida	700	713	0.5	1.3	November 13, 1880
Baxter	Jasper	962	1,101	0.65	1.7	December 13, 1894
Bayard	Guthrie	405	471	0.46	1.2	June 14, 1883
Beacon	Mahaska	445	494	1.0	2.6	February 7, 1874
Beaconsfield	Ringgold	15	15	0.72	1.9	January 18, 1990
Beaman	Grundy	161	191	0.19	0.49	April 26, 1884
Beaver	Boone	46	48	0.25	0.65	October 5, 1912
Bedford†	Taylor	1,508	1,440	1.6	4.1	July 28, 1866
Belle Plaine	Benton	2,330	2,534	3.22	8.3	May 26, 1868
Bellevue	Jackson	2,363	2,191	1.34	3.5	February 5, 1851
Belmond	Wright	2,463	2,376	2.85	7.4	October 21, 1881
Bennett	Cedar	347	405	0.2	0.52	December 26, 1896
Benton	Ringgold	39	41	0.64	1.7	July 3, 1900
Berkley	Boone	23	32	0.21	0.54	October 11, 1912
Bernard	Dubuque	114	112	0.11	0.28	June 8, 1897
Bertram	Linn	269	294	1.68	4.4	January 17, 1914
Bettendorf	Scott	39,102	33,217	21.22	55.0	June 5, 1903
Bevington	Madison; Warren	57	63	0.45	1.2	February 1, 1916
Birmingham	Van Buren	367	448	1.06	2.7	May 20, 1856
Blairsburg	Hamilton	176	215	0.65	1.7	December 21, 1900
Blairstown	Benton	713	692	0.52	1.3	October 15, 1868
Blakesburg	Wapello	274	296	0.27	0.70	December 31, 1900
Blanchard	Page	29	38	0.23	0.60	June 11, 1880
Blencoe	Monona	233	224	0.76	2.0	October 24, 1891
Blockton	Taylor	125	192	0.65	1.7	March 28, 1890
Bloomfield†	Davis	2,682	2,640	2.25	5.8	January 13, 1855
Blue Grass	Scott; Muscatine	1,666	1,452	2.89	7.5	December 10, 1903
Bode	Humboldt	302	302	0.41	1.1	February 20, 1892
Bonaparte	Van Buren	359	433	0.37	0.96	January 31, 1899
Bondurant	Polk	7,365	3,860	8.38	21.7	December 23, 1897
Boone†	Boone	12,460	12,661	9.02	23.4	October 24, 1876
Bouton	Dallas	127	129	0.14	0.36	September 27, 1911
Boxholm	Boone	181	195	1.02	2.6	September 29, 1913
Boyden	Sioux	701	707	0.75	1.9	May 24, 1889
Braddyville	Page	147	159	0.53	1.4	February 9, 1880
Bradgate	Humboldt	75	86	0.35	0.91	June 20, 1893
Brandon	Buchanan	341	309	0.32	0.83	April 14, 1905
Brayton	Audubon	143	128	0.62	1.6	May 17, 1899
Breda	Carroll	500	483	0.74	1.9	October 30, 1883
Bridgewater	Adair	148	182	0.29	0.75	April 1, 1905
Brighton	Washington	600	652	0.71	1.8	July 26, 1870
Bristow	Butler	145	160	0.94	2.4	December 15, 1881
Britt	Hancock	2,044	2,069	1.26	3.3	June 23, 1881
Bronson	Woodbury	294	322	0.31	0.80	June 8, 1967
Brooklyn	Poweshiek	1,502	1,468	1.23	3.2	May 3, 1869
Brunsville	Plymouth	129	151	0.24	0.62	July 18, 1911
Buck Grove	Crawford	34	43	0.36	0.93	June 29, 1906
Buckeye	Hardin	86	108	1.0	2.6	1901
Buffalo	Scott	1,176	1,270	6.45	16.7	July 15, 1875
Buffalo Center	Winnebago	857	905	1.07	2.8	February 17, 1894
Burlington†	Des Moines	23,982	25,663	14.48	37.5	June 10, 1845
Burt	Kossuth	418	533	0.44	1.1	November 28, 1893
Bussey	Marion	387	422	0.33	0.85	April 9, 1895
Calamus	Clinton	356	439	0.48	1.2	October 6, 1875
Callender	Webster	368	376	0.52	1.3	November 17, 1893
Calmar	Winneshiek	1,125	978	1.07	2.8	July 14, 1869
Calumet	O'Brien	146	170	0.27	0.70	January 31, 1895
Camanche	Clinton	4,570	4,448	8.68	22.5	January 28, 1857
Cambridge	Story	827	827	1.1	2.8	December 6, 1881
Cantril	Van Buren	224	222	0.51	1.3	June 4, 1874
Carbon	Adams	36	34	0.71	1.8	July 18, 1903
Carlisle	Warren; Polk	4,160	3,876	5.56	14.4	May 10, 1870
Carpenter	Mitchell	87	109	0.16	0.41	April 20, 1880
Carroll†	Carroll	10,321	10,103	5.69	14.7	September 27, 1869
Carson	Pottawattamie	766	812	0.71	1.8	March 28, 1881
Carter Lake	Pottawattamie	3,791	3,785	1.87	4.8	July 5, 1930
Cascade	Dubuque; Jones	2,386	1,978	1.87	4.8	December 14, 1880
Casey	Guthrie; Adair	387	426	0.74	1.9	June 29, 1880
Castalia	Winneshiek	145	173	0.58	1.5	August 16, 1901
Castana	Monona	107	147	0.93	2.4	March 3, 1891
Cedar Falls	Black Hawk	40,713	39,260	28.75	74.5	February 24, 1858
Cedar Rapids†	Linn	137,710	126,326	70.8	183	January 15, 1849
Center Point	Linn	2,579	2,421	2.6	6.7	February 6, 1875
Centerville†	Appanoose	5,412	5,528	4.86	12.6	January 23, 1857
Central City	Linn	1,264	1,257	0.95	2.5	July 6, 1889
Centralia	Dubuque	116	134	0.58	1.5	June 3, 1933
Chariton†	Lucas	4,193	4,321	3.82	9.9	December 9, 1874
Charles City†	Floyd	7,396	7,652	6.22	16.1	May 1, 1869
Charlotte	Clinton	389	394	0.58	1.5	December 5, 1904
Charter Oak	Crawford	535	502	0.48	1.2	February 6, 1891
Chatsworth	Sioux	75	79	0.49	1.3	December 31, 1900
Chelsea	Tama	229	267	1.01	2.6	March 4, 1878
Cherokee†	Cherokee	5,199	5,253	6.43	16.7	April 5, 1873
Chester	Howard	139	127	1.34	3.5	September 22, 1900
Chillicothe	Wapello	76	97	0.23	0.60	December 22, 1881
Churdan	Greene	365	386	2.11	5.5	March 25, 1884
Cincinnati	Appanoose	290	357	1.74	4.5	February 13, 1875
Clare	Webster	136	146	0.51	1.3	March 29, 1892
Clarence	Cedar	1,039	974	0.68	1.8	February 26, 1866
Clarinda†	Page	5,369	5,572	5.19	13.4	December 8, 1866
Clarion†	Wright	2,810	2,850	3.26	8.4	October 15, 1881
Clarksville	Butler	1,264	1,439	1.33	3.4	May 11, 1874
Clayton	Clayton	45	43	0.49	1.3	November 23, 1901
Clear Lake	Cerro Gordo	7,687	7,777	10.8	28	May 26, 1871
Clearfield	Taylor; Ringgold	278	363	1.26	3.3	December 16, 1882
Cleghorn	Cherokee	240	240	0.34	0.88	January 25, 1901
Clemons	Marshall	140	148	0.27	0.70	May 25, 1903
Clermont	Fayette	586	632	1.23	3.2	June 15, 1875
Clinton†	Clinton	24,469	26,885	35.15	91.0	January 26, 1857
Clio	Wayne	67	80	0.75	1.9	February 20, 1882
Clive	Polk; Dallas	18,601	15,447	7.59	19.7	October 9, 1956
Clutier	Tama	213	213	0.76	2.0	January 16, 1901
Coburg	Montgomery	26	42	0.29	0.75	January 1, 1875
Coggon	Linn	701	658	0.62	1.6	June 14, 1892
Coin	Page	176	193	0.8	2.1	July 30, 1881
Colesburg	Delaware	386	404	0.29	0.75	February 21, 1893
Colfax	Jasper	2,255	1,925	1.79	4.6	August 10, 1875
College Springs	Page	172	214	1.1	2.8	January 19, 1875
Collins	Story	495	495	0.49	1.3	December 28, 1894
Colo	Story	845	876	1.06	2.7	April 26, 1876
Columbus City	Louisa	392	391	0.24	0.62	November 26, 1870
Columbus Junction	Louisa	1,830	1,899	2.19	5.7	May 25, 1874
Colwell	Floyd	55	73	0.18	0.47	September 27, 1921
Conesville	Muscatine	352	432	0.36	0.93	March 21, 1874
Conrad	Grundy	1,093	1,108	1.2	3.1	November 15, 1886
Coon Rapids	Carroll; Guthrie	1,300	1,305	1.78	4.6	November 2, 1882
Coppock	Henry; Washington; Jefferson	36	47	0.23	0.60	August 24, 1901
Coralville	Johnson	22,318	18,907	12.01	31.1	November 22, 1873
Corning†	Adams	1,564	1,635	1.58	4.1	December 13, 1871
Correctionville	Woodbury	766	821	0.57	1.5	October 3, 1882
Corwith	Hancock	266	309	1.48	3.8	June 1, 1886
Corydon†	Wayne	1,526	1,585	1.39	3.6	April 27, 1867
Cotter	Louisa	39	48	0.25	0.65	April 1, 1912
Coulter	Franklin	219	281	2.45	6.3	April 24, 1909
Council Bluffs†	Pottawattamie	62,799	62,230	40.97	106.1	January 19, 1853
Craig	Plymouth	79	89	0.09	0.23	April 6, 1911
Crawfordsville	Washington	277	264	0.35	0.91	March 26, 1891
Crescent	Pottawattamie	628	617	1.09	2.8	October 16, 1959
Cresco†	Howard	3,888	3,868	3.35	8.7	June 6, 1868
Creston†	Union	7,536	7,834	5.19	13.4	April 22, 1871
Cromwell	Union	105	107	0.29	0.75	November 24, 1893
Crystal Lake	Hancock	253	250	0.25	0.65	April 19, 1898
Cumberland	Cass	251	262	0.6	1.6	May 2, 1893
Cumming	Warren	436	351	2.56	6.6	October 21, 1924
Curlew	Palo Alto	37	58	0.76	2.0	May 22, 1902
Cushing	Woodbury	230	220	0.32	0.83	November 21, 1892
Cylinder	Palo Alto	87	88	0.07	0.18	April 5, 1900
Dakota City†	Humboldt	759	843	0.74	1.9	June 22, 1878
Dallas Center	Dallas	1,901	1,623	4.58	11.9	March 22, 1880
Dana	Greene	38	71	0.28	0.73	July 22, 1907
Danbury	Woodbury	320	348	0.4	1.0	October 1, 1881
Danville	Des Moines	927	934	0.75	1.9	September 27, 1902
Davenport†	Scott	101,724	99,685	66.33	171.8	February 5, 1881
Davis City	Decatur	179	204	0.59	1.5	May 19, 1877
Dawson	Dallas	116	131	0.48	1.2	April 25, 1908
Dayton	Webster	772	837	0.85	2.2	July 8, 1881
De Soto	Dallas	915	1,050	1.52	3.9	April 28, 1875
DeWitt	Clinton	5,514	5,322	5.98	15.5	September 20, 1858
Decatur City	Decatur	175	197	0.4	1.0	January 8, 1875
Decorah†	Winneshiek	7,587	8,127	7.01	18.2	June 30, 1857
Dedham	Carroll	224	266	0.58	1.5	April 2, 1884
Deep River	Poweshiek	249	279	0.43	1.1	June 15, 1887
Defiance	Shelby	245	284	0.39	1.0	December 4, 1882
Delaware	Delaware	142	159	0.8	2.1	July 22, 1915
Delhi	Delaware	420	460	0.97	2.5	April 26, 1909
Delmar	Clinton	542	525	0.76	2.0	June 10, 1876
Deloit	Crawford	250	264	0.42	1.1	May 19, 1900
Delta	Keokuk	264	328	0.93	2.4	March 22, 1877
Denison†	Crawford	8,373	8,298	6.54	16.9	October 2, 1875
Denver	Bremer	1,919	1,780	1.64	4.2	June 30, 1896
Derby	Lucas	90	115	0.26	0.67	February 4, 1901
Des Moines ††	Polk; Warren	214,133	203,433	80.87	209.5	October 18, 1851
Dexter	Dallas	640	611	2.35	6.1	January 7, 1871
Diagonal	Ringgold	344	330	0.9	2.3	March 6, 1896
Dickens	Clay	146	185	0.84	2.2	April 7, 1909
Dike	Grundy	1,304	1,209	1.39	3.6	January 16, 1901
Dixon	Scott	202	247	0.15	0.39	May 12, 1909
Dolliver	Emmet	65	66	0.36	0.93	April 16, 1902
Donahue	Scott	335	346	0.35	0.91	May 1, 1909
Donnellson	Lee	885	912	1.26	3.3	October 25, 1892
Doon	Lyon	619	577	0.57	1.5	March 8, 1892
Dougherty	Cerro Gordo	62	58	0.55	1.4	December 29, 1900
Dow City	Crawford	485	510	0.32	0.83	February 22, 1884
Dows	Wright; Franklin	521	538	0.77	2.0	May 3, 1892
Drakesville	Davis	164	184	0.25	0.65	May 5, 1866
Dubuque†	Dubuque	59,667	57,637	29.97	77.6	January 28, 1857
Dumont	Butler	634	637	1.76	4.6	January 24, 1896
Duncombe	Webster	381	410	1.97	5.1	January 25, 1893
Dundee	Delaware	198	174	0.36	0.93	August 30, 1917
Dunkerton	Black Hawk	842	852	0.98	2.5	March 18, 1899
Dunlap	Harrison; Crawford	1,038	1,042	1.13	2.9	January 1871
Durango	Dubuque	20	22	0.04	0.10	June 5, 1933
Durant	Cedar; Scott; Muscatine	1,871	1,832	1.15	3.0	July 1, 1867
Dyersville	Dubuque; Delaware	4,477	4,058	5.63	14.6	November 9, 1872
Dysart	Tama	1,281	1,379	1.25	3.2	May 30, 1881
Eagle Grove	Wright	3,601	3,583	4.04	10.5	October 16, 1882
Earlham	Madison	1,410	1,450	0.97	2.5	April 26, 1870
Earling	Shelby	397	437	0.6	1.6	June 1, 1892
Earlville	Delaware	716	812	0.55	1.4	June 12, 1882
Early	Sac	587	557	0.39	1.0	May 22, 1883
East Peru	Madison	115	125	0.94	2.4	March 31, 1897
Eddyville	Wapello; Mahaska; Monroe	970	1,024	1.18	3.1	February 22, 1900
Edgewood	Delaware; Clayton	909	864	0.85	2.2	April 6, 1899
Elberon	Tama	184	196	0.65	1.7	October 28, 1893
Eldon	Wapello	783	927	1.11	2.9	April 29, 1872
Eldora†	Hardin	2,663	2,732	4.33	11.2	July 1, 1895
Eldridge	Scott	6,726	5,651	9.48	24.6	May 1, 1900
Elgin	Fayette	685	683	0.66	1.7	March 14, 1892
Elk Horn	Shelby	601	662	0.77	2.0	February 28, 1910
Elk Run Heights	Black Hawk	1,069	1,117	1.06	2.7	May 31, 1951
Elkader†	Clayton	1,209	1,273	1.39	3.6	May 1, 1900
Elkhart	Polk	882	683	1.58	4.1	July 27, 1904
Elkport	Clayton	29	37	0.25	0.65	February 24, 1896
Elliott	Montgomery	338	350	0.42	1.1	March 14, 1882
Ellston	Ringgold	19	43	0.20	0.52	January 1, 1895
Ellsworth	Hamilton	508	531	0.9	2.3	October 12, 1893
Elma	Howard	505	546	1.29	3.3	July 11, 1891
Ely	Linn	2,328	1,776	1.44	3.7	August 12, 1903
Emerson	Mills	403	438	0.26	0.67	December 2, 1875
Emmetsburg†	Palo Alto	3,706	3,904	3.81	9.9	November 17, 1877
Epworth	Dubuque	2,023	1,860	1.56	4.0	October 20, 1879
Essex	Page	722	798	1.5	3.9	January 20, 1876
Estherville†	Emmet	5,904	6,360	5.32	13.8	October 4, 1881
Evansdale	Black Hawk	4,561	4,751	4.05	10.5	November 13, 1947
Everly	Clay	575	603	1.09	2.8	April 7, 1902
Exira	Audubon	787	840	1.02	2.6	December 13, 1880
Exline	Appanoose	160	160	0.99	2.6	June 20, 1904
Fairbank	Buchanan; Fayette	1,111	1,113	0.71	1.8	May 12, 1891
Fairfax	Linn	2,828	2,123	1.94	5.0	August 11, 1930
Fairfield†	Jefferson	9,416	9,464	6.26	16.2	May 14, 1875
Farley	Dubuque	1,766	1,537	1.85	4.8	March 1, 1879
Farmersburg	Clayton	271	302	0.4	1.0	June 1, 1902
Farmington	Van Buren	579	664	0.47	1.2	January 11, 1841
Farnhamville	Calhoun; Webster	383	371	0.65	1.7	April 1, 1893
Farragut	Fremont	490	485	0.41	1.1	January 21, 1878
Fayette	Fayette	1,256	1,338	1.48	3.8	March 14, 1874
Fenton	Kossuth	271	279	0.34	0.88	June 10, 1903
Ferguson	Marshall	97	126	0.26	0.67	December 4, 1906
Fertile	Worth	305	370	0.94	2.4	April 10, 1908
Floris	Davis	116	138	0.48	1.2	May 12, 1913
Floyd	Floyd	313	335	0.6	1.6	February 26, 1899
Fonda	Pocahontas	636	631	1.05	2.7	March 21, 1884
Fontanelle	Adair	676	672	0.96	2.5	August 23, 1871
Forest City†	Winnebago; Hancock	4,285	4,151	4.64	12.0	June 14, 1878
Fort Atkinson	Winneshiek	312	349	0.31	0.80	June 5, 1895
Fort Dodge†	Webster	24,871	25,206	16.05	41.6	October 26, 1869
Fort Madison†	Lee	10,270	11,051	9.49	24.6	February 5, 1895
Fostoria	Clay	230	231	0.47	1.2	January 30, 1912
Franklin	Lee	131	143	0.15	0.39	November 14, 1874
Fraser	Boone	101	102	0.83	2.1	February 8, 1904
Fredericksburg	Chickasaw	987	931	0.86	2.2	December 18, 1894
Frederika	Bremer	204	183	0.2	0.52	March 28, 1896
Fredonia	Louisa	222	244	0.17	0.44	May 30, 1874
Fremont	Mahaska	708	743	1.03	2.7	March 14, 1883
Fruitland	Muscatine	963	977	1.8	4.7	August 24, 1972
Galt	Wright	26	32	0.54	1.4	January 2, 1913
Galva	Ida	435	434	0.71	1.8	September 26, 1889
Garber	Clayton	76	88	0.23	0.60	November 18, 1907
Garden Grove	Decatur	174	211	0.69	1.8	November 14, 1879
Garnavillo	Clayton	763	745	1.02	2.6	November 21, 1907
Garner†	Hancock	3,065	3,129	2.05	5.3	November 19, 1881
Garrison	Benton	344	371	0.25	0.65	June 9, 1883
Garwin	Tama	481	527	1.01	2.6	June 5, 1890
Geneva	Franklin	136	165	0.42	1.1	April 7, 1903
George	Lyon	1,077	1,080	2.4	6.2	March 27, 1890
Gibson	Keokuk	63	61	0.07	0.18	December 14, 1954
Gilbert	Story	1,211	1,082	0.91	2.4	July 15, 1882
Gilbertville	Black Hawk	794	712	0.4	1.0	April 9, 1917
Gillett Grove	Clay	30	49	0.19	0.49	August 29, 1974
Gilman	Marshall	542	509	0.54	1.4	April 24, 1876
Gilmore City	Humboldt; Pocahontas	487	504	1.25	3.2	April 16, 1887
Gladbrook	Tama	799	945	0.7	1.8	December 20, 1880
Glenwood†	Mills	5,073	5,269	2.95	7.6	January 17, 1857
Glidden	Carroll	1,151	1,146	1.11	2.9	August 22, 1873
Goldfield	Wright	634	635	1.19	3.1	March 19, 1885
Goodell	Hancock	140	139	0.43	1.1	February 3, 1893
Goose Lake	Clinton	239	240	0.32	0.83	December 26, 1908
Gowrie	Webster	952	1,037	1.45	3.8	March 18, 1881
Graettinger	Palo Alto	832	844	0.77	2.0	September 30, 1893
Graf	Dubuque	76	79	0.14	0.36	August 30, 1933
Grafton	Worth	216	252	0.33	0.85	April 10, 1896
Grand Junction	Greene	725	824	0.97	2.5	May 6, 1872
Grand Mound	Clinton	615	642	1.82	4.7	February 11, 1884
Grand River	Decatur	196	236	0.21	0.54	December 21, 1899
Grandview	Louisa	437	556	0.23	0.60	February 18, 1901
Granger	Dallas; Polk	1,654	1,244	1.45	3.8	September 6, 1905
Grant	Montgomery	86	92	0.74	1.9	February 27, 1912
Granville	Sioux	310	312	0.29	0.75	June 22, 1891
Gravity	Taylor	154	188	0.3	0.78	May 26, 1882
Gray	Audubon	61	63	1.0	2.6	November 10, 1894
Greeley	Delaware	217	256	0.37	0.96	July 8, 1892
Greene	Butler; Floyd	990	1,130	1.14	3.0	July 15, 1879
Greenfield†	Adair	2,062	1,982	1.81	4.7	May 22, 1876
Greenville	Clay	71	75	0.18	0.47	December 30, 1916
Grimes	Polk; Dallas	15,392	8,246	11.84	30.7	May 7, 1894
Grinnell	Poweshiek	9,564	9,218	5.6	15	April 28, 1865
Griswold	Cass	994	1,036	0.62	1.6	December 13, 1885
Grundy Center†	Grundy	2,796	2,706	2.53	6.6	April 17, 1877
Gruver	Emmet	63	94	0.13	0.34	February 4, 1913
Guernsey	Poweshiek	63	63	0.18	0.47	September 4, 1906
Guthrie Center†	Guthrie	1,593	1,569	2.47	6.4	June 25, 1880
Guttenberg	Clayton	1,817	1,919	2.09	5.4	January 27, 1857
Halbur	Carroll	243	246	0.19	0.49	April 22, 1902
Hamburg	Fremont	890	1,187	1.1	2.8	April 1, 1867
Hamilton	Marion	119	130	0.54	1.4	April 11, 1900
Hampton†	Franklin	4,337	4,461	4.43	11.5	November 19, 1870
Hancock	Pottawattamie	200	196	0.74	1.9	May 16, 1891
Hanlontown	Worth	206	226	0.97	2.5	January 18, 1902
Hansell	Franklin	82	98	0.23	0.60	May 7, 1918
Harcourt	Webster	264	303	1.0	2.6	February 11, 1896
Hardy	Humboldt	57	47	0.44	1.1	April 13, 1915
Harlan†	Shelby	4,893	5,106	4.39	11.4	April 25, 1879
Harper	Keokuk	118	114	0.09	0.23	November 17, 1879
Harpers Ferry	Allamakee	262	328	0.63	1.6	December 24, 1901
Harris	Osceola	151	170	0.79	2.0	1903
Hartford	Warren	733	771	1.03	2.7	June 29, 1913
Hartley	O'Brien	1,605	1,672	1.3	3.4	July 24, 1888
Hartwick	Poweshiek	92	86	0.13	0.34	1912
Harvey	Marion	236	235	0.68	1.8	December 12, 1903
Hastings	Mills	152	152	0.41	1.1	May 26, 1879
Havelock	Pocahontas	130	138	0.57	1.5	February 16, 1892
Haverhill	Marshall	165	173	0.13	0.34	July 12, 1968
Hawarden	Sioux	2,700	2,538	2.89	7.5	March 18, 1887
Hawkeye	Fayette	438	449	0.67	1.7	April 9, 1895
Hayesville	Keokuk	41	50	0.25	0.65	October 13, 1916
Hazleton	Buchanan	713	823	0.75	1.9	June 22, 1892
Hedrick	Keokuk	728	764	1.53	4.0	April 23, 1883
Henderson	Mills	144	185	0.21	0.54	May 18, 1893
Hiawatha	Linn	7,183	7,024	4.23	11.0	June 12, 1950
Hills	Johnson	863	703	0.63	1.6	1906
Hillsboro	Henry	163	180	0.51	1.3	July 19, 1916
Hinton	Plymouth	935	928	0.69	1.8	June 6, 1908
Holland	Grundy	269	282	0.25	0.65	June 29, 1897
Holstein	Ida	1,501	1,396	1.49	3.9	April 25, 1883
Holy Cross	Dubuque	356	374	0.34	0.88	August 20, 1898
Hopkinton	Delaware	622	628	0.62	1.6	March 3, 1874
Hornick	Woodbury	255	225	0.25	0.65	June 23, 1896
Hospers	Sioux	718	698	0.48	1.2	December 6, 1890
Houghton	Lee	141	146	0.31	0.80	February 19, 1962
Hubbard	Hardin	860	845	1.84	4.8	November 1, 1881
Hudson	Black Hawk	2,546	2,282	8.4	22	July 1, 1893
Hull	Sioux	2,384	2,146	1.2	3.1	May 15, 1886
Humboldt	Humboldt	4,792	4,690	4.64	12.0	March 22, 1874
Humeston	Wayne	465	494	0.61	1.6	March 4, 1881
Huxley	Story	4,244	3,317	3.15	8.2	August 27, 1902
Ida Grove†	Ida	2,051	2,142	2.1	5.4	May 31, 1878
Imogene	Fremont	39	72	0.2	0.52	February 18, 1881
Independence†	Buchanan	6,064	5,966	6.08	15.7	October 15, 1864
Indianola†	Warren	15,833	14,782	11.25	29.1	October 5, 1863
Inwood	Lyon	928	814	1.34	3.5	April 25, 1893
Ionia	Chickasaw	226	291	0.55	1.4	April 23, 1891
Iowa City†	Johnson	74,828	67,862	25.01	64.8	January 24, 1853
Iowa Falls	Hardin	5,106	5,238	5.36	13.9	May 4, 1869
Ireton	Sioux	590	609	1.01	2.6	October 13, 1890
Irwin	Shelby	319	341	0.6	1.6	May 20, 1892
Jackson Junction	Winneshiek	37	58	5.99	15.5	January 9, 1897
Jamaica	Guthrie	195	224	0.46	1.2	January 4, 1901
Janesville	Bremer; Black Hawk	1,034	930	1.44	3.7	October 29, 1895
Jefferson†	Greene	4,182	4,345	5.97	15.5	November 20, 1871
Jesup	Buchanan; Black Hawk	2,508	2,520	1.78	4.6	December 21, 1875
Jewell Junction	Hamilton	1,216	1,215	3.87	10.0	October 22, 1880
Johnston	Polk	24,064	17,278	17.16	44.4	September 19, 1969
Joice	Worth	208	222	1.0	2.6	June 4, 1913
Jolley	Calhoun	28	41	0.11	0.28	November 16, 1895
Kalona	Washington	2,630	2,363	2.04	5.3	May 22, 1890
Kamrar	Hamilton	179	199	0.86	2.2	June 6, 1896
Kanawha	Hancock	658	652	2.01	5.2	April 18, 1902
Kellerton	Ringgold	243	315	0.66	1.7	December 3, 1881
Kelley	Story	304	309	0.68	1.8	January 31, 1900
Kellogg	Jasper	606	599	0.37	0.96	February 6, 1874
Kensett	Worth	257	266	1.53	4.0	February 10, 1894
Keokuk†	Lee	9,900	10,780	9.13	23.6	December 13, 1848
Keomah Village	Mahaska	110	84	0.03	0.078	August 3, 1973 (Note: Formerly incorporated as Keomah until December 7, 1981.)
Keosauqua†	Van Buren	936	1,006	1.45	3.8	February 6, 1851
Keota	Keokuk	897	1,009	0.63	1.6	December 18, 1873
Keswick	Keokuk	242	246	0.43	1.1	July 5, 1912
Keystone	Benton	599	622	0.45	1.2	December 15, 1893
Kimballton	Audubon	291	322	0.77	2.0	June 5, 1980
Kingsley	Plymouth	1,396	1,411	1.61	4.2	January 15, 1884
Kinross	Keokuk	80	73	0.2	0.52	September 10, 1898
Kirkman	Shelby	56	64	0.28	0.73	July 6, 1892
Kirkville	Wapello	157	167	0.56	1.5	December 2, 1883
Kiron	Crawford	267	279	0.21	0.54	June 22, 1900
Klemme	Hancock	441	507	0.51	1.3	February 9, 1899
Knierim	Calhoun	53	60	1.01	2.6	June 13, 1901
Knoxville†	Marion	7,595	7,313	4.63	12.0	January 24, 1855
La Motte	Jackson	237	260	0.46	1.2	May 24, 1879
La Porte City	Black Hawk	2,284	2,285	2.55	6.6	January 31, 1871
Lacona	Warren	345	361	0.36	0.93	November 25, 1881
Ladora	Iowa	229	283	0.3	0.78	December 27, 1879
Lake City	Calhoun	1,731	1,727	4.81	12.5	March 14, 1887
Lake Mills	Winnebago	2,143	2,027	2.7	7.0	June 7, 1880
Lake Park	Dickinson	1,167	1,105	1.55	4.0	July 1, 1892
Lake View	Sac	1,113	1,142	2.11	5.5	October 29, 1887
Lakeside	Buena Vista	700	596	0.18	0.47	July 15, 1933
Lakota	Kossuth	267	255	0.19	0.49	October 1, 1918
Lambs Grove	Jasper	174	172	0.1	0.26	December 29, 1952
Lamoni	Decatur	1,969	2,324	3.33	8.6	October 15, 1885
Lamont	Buchanan	429	461	0.58	1.5	December 10, 1892
Lanesboro	Carroll	119	121	0.74	1.9	April 30, 1903
Lansing	Allamakee	968	999	1.08	2.8	July 1, 1867
Larchwood	Lyon	926	866	0.99	2.6	January 6, 1892
Larrabee	Cherokee	123	132	0.12	0.31	July 25, 1896
Latimer	Franklin	477	507	2.4	6.2	April 17, 1901
Laurel	Marshall	220	239	0.25	0.65	April 23, 1903
Laurens	Pocahontas	1,264	1,258	0.73	1.9	April 30, 1890
Lawler	Chickasaw	406	439	0.88	2.3	April 28, 1873
Lawton	Woodbury	943	908	0.71	1.8	1906
Le Claire	Scott	4,710	3,765	4.67	12.1	January 13, 1855
Le Grand	Marshall; Tama	905	938	1.04	2.7	May 9, 1891
Le Mars†	Plymouth	10,571	9,826	8.96	23.2	May 25, 1881
Le Roy	Decatur	11	15	0.33	0.85	May 6, 1904
Ledyard	Kossuth	121	130	0.33	0.85	April 16, 1895
Lehigh	Webster	395	416	2.09	5.4	February 10, 1883
Leighton	Mahaska	158	162	0.1	0.26	September 21, 1909
Leland	Winnebago	249	289	1.33	3.4	February 28, 1895
Lenox	Taylor; Adams	1,339	1,407	1.98	5.1	July 2, 1875
Leon†	Decatur	1,822	1,977	3.17	8.2	May 2, 1867
Lester	Lyon	296	294	1.82	4.7	December 26, 1892
Letts	Louisa	363	384	0.59	1.5	July 28, 1877
Lewis	Cass	357	433	0.5	1.3	May 14, 1874
Libertyville	Jefferson	274	315	0.49	1.3	April 15, 1916
Lidderdale	Carroll	166	180	2.42	6.3	November 27, 1905
Lime Springs	Howard	473	505	1.02	2.6	April 17, 1876
Lincoln	Tama	121	162	0.46	1.2	September 10, 1913 (Note: Formerly incorporated as Berlin until June 12, 1918.)
Linden	Dallas	200	199	0.79	2.0	January 12, 1893
Lineville	Wayne	195	217	0.9	2.3	November 6, 1871
Linn Grove	Buena Vista	163	154	0.58	1.5	March 4, 1912
Lisbon	Linn	2,223	2,152	2.14	5.5	February 10, 1875
Liscomb	Marshall	291	301	0.98	2.5	March 23, 1874
Little Rock	Lyon	439	459	0.8	2.1	November 26, 1894
Little Sioux	Harrison	166	170	0.37	0.96	November 26, 1883
Livermore	Humboldt	381	384	0.7	1.8	March 11, 1882
Lockridge	Jefferson	244	268	0.74	1.9	June 17, 1913
Logan†	Harrison	1,397	1,534	1.0	2.6	April 22, 1876
Lohrville	Calhoun	381	368	2.14	5.5	December 14, 1882
Lone Rock	Kossuth	146	146	0.12	0.31	August 5, 1915
Lone Tree	Johnson	1,357	1,300	1.04	2.7	May 20, 1890
Long Grove	Scott	838	808	1.02	2.6	August 1, 1912
Lorimor	Union	386	360	0.38	0.98	December 16, 1892
Lost Nation	Clinton	434	446	0.64	1.7	June 9, 1903
Lovilia	Monroe	472	538	0.5	1.3	April 21, 1933
Low Moor	Clinton	250	288	0.46	1.2	February 10, 1897
Lowden	Cedar	807	789	1.02	2.6	March 12, 1869
Lu Verne	Kossuth; Humboldt	258	261	2.26	5.9	July 6, 1887
Luana	Clayton	301	269	1.05	2.7	May 29, 1911
Lucas	Lucas	172	216	0.97	2.5	March 18, 1887
Luther	Boone	152	122	0.77	2.0	December 29, 1903
Luxemburg	Dubuque	245	240	0.46	1.2	January 2, 1912
Luzerne	Benton	112	96	0.12	0.31	October 24, 1895
Lynnville	Jasper	380	379	1.11	2.9	August 9, 1875
Lytton	Sac; Calhoun	282	315	0.2	0.52	July 21, 1911
Macedonia	Pottawattamie	267	246	0.33	0.85	June 21, 1892
Macksburg	Madison	97	113	1.99	5.2	December 24, 1876
Madrid	Boone	2,802	2,543	1.19	3.1	June 9, 1883
Magnolia	Harrison	190	183	0.57	1.5	November 30, 1909
Maharishi Vedic City	Jefferson	277	259	3.36	8.7	July 25, 2001 (Note: Formerly incorporated as Vedic City until November 13, 2001.)
Malcom	Poweshiek	270	287	0.61	1.6	April 23, 1872
Mallard	Palo Alto	257	274	0.41	1.1	June 25, 1895
Maloy	Ringgold	22	29	0.62	1.6	June 18, 1901
Malvern	Mills	1,046	1,142	1.19	3.1	February 24, 1872
Manchester†	Delaware	5,065	5,179	4.68	12.1	March 19, 1864
Manilla	Crawford	775	776	1.03	2.7	October 3, 1887
Manly	Worth	1,256	1,323	1.47	3.8	November 19, 1898
Manning	Carroll	1,455	1,500	2.49	6.4	February 17, 1882
Manson	Calhoun	1,709	1,690	3.18	8.2	May 5, 1877
Mapleton	Monona	1,165	1,224	1.6	4.1	May 10, 1870
Maquoketa†	Jackson; Clinton	6,128	6,141	4.33	11.2	January 27, 1857
Marathon	Buena Vista	230	237	0.74	1.9	October 31, 1892
Marble Rock	Floyd	271	307	0.83	2.1	February 8, 1881
Marcus	Cherokee	1,079	1,117	1.54	4.0	May 15, 1882
Marengo†	Iowa	2,435	2,528	2.08	5.4	July 4, 1859
Marion	Linn	41,535	34,768	16.05	41.6	August 10, 1865
Marne	Cass	110	120	0.57	1.5	May 10, 1892
Marquette	Clayton	429	375	1.74	4.5	June 2, 1874
Marshalltown†	Marshall	27,591	27,552	19.28	49.9	March 5, 1923
Martelle	Jones	249	255	0.34	0.88	April 28, 1899
Martensdale	Warren	421	465	0.39	1.0	October 29, 1920
Martinsburg	Keokuk	110	112	0.38	0.98	December 30, 1887
Marysville	Marion	44	66	0.37	0.96	July 31, 1875
Mason City†	Cerro Gordo	27,338	28,079	27.81	72.0	December 21, 1869
Masonville	Delaware	99	127	0.33	0.85	June 28, 1901
Massena	Cass	359	355	0.69	1.8	January 18, 1887
Matlock	Sioux	74	87	0.37	0.96	July 5, 1897
Maurice	Sioux	265	275	0.55	1.4	May 23, 1891
Maxwell	Story	859	920	1.11	2.9	December 17, 1883
Maynard	Fayette	476	518	0.99	2.6	June 9, 1887
Maysville	Scott	156	176	0.27	0.70	June 21, 1909
McCallsburg	Story	353	333	0.53	1.4	February 25, 1901
McCausland	Scott	313	291	0.54	1.4	May 28, 1909
McClelland	Pottawattamie	146	151	0.17	0.44	December 14, 1904
McGregor	Clayton	742	871	1.3	3.4	March 7, 1859
McIntire	Mitchell	113	122	1.01	2.6	July 9, 1894
Mechanicsville	Cedar	1,020	1,146	0.83	2.1	November 25, 1867
Mediapolis	Des Moines	1,688	1,560	1.2	3.1	June 14, 1875
Melbourne	Marshall	786	830	0.57	1.5	October 29, 1895
Melcher-Dallas	Marion	1,195	1,288	1.0	2.6	June 26, 1986
Melrose	Monroe	110	112	1.01	2.6	March 20, 1882
Melvin	Osceola	199	214	0.18	0.47	1901
Menlo	Guthrie	345	353	0.47	1.2	February 2, 1881
Meriden	Cherokee	161	159	0.11	0.28	December 24, 1881
Merrill	Plymouth	717	755	0.57	1.5	April 24, 1894
Meservey	Cerro Gordo	222	256	1.51	3.9	August 24, 1893
Middletown	Des Moines	363	318	0.61	1.6	May 11, 1914
Miles	Jackson	408	445	1.15	3.0	May 4, 1893
Milford	Dickinson	3,321	2,898	2.28	5.9	January 12, 1892
Millersburg	Iowa	135	159	0.14	0.36	January 12, 1911
Millerton	Wayne	36	45	0.21	0.54	April 26, 1915
Milo	Warren	778	775	0.62	1.6	November 4, 1880
Milton	Van Buren	380	443	2.51	6.5	May 20, 1878
Minburn	Dallas	325	365	0.28	0.73	May 24, 1892
Minden	Pottawattamie	600	599	0.42	1.1	October 6, 1880
Mingo	Jasper	302	302	0.61	1.6	February 13, 1903
Missouri Valley	Harrison	2,678	2,838	3.13	8.1	October 30, 1871
Mitchell	Mitchell	124	138	0.54	1.4	May 27, 1879
Mitchellville	Polk; Jasper	2,485	2,254	2.33	6.0	September 30, 1875
Modale	Harrison	273	283	1.05	2.7	April 22, 1882
Mondamin	Harrison	339	402	0.45	1.2	December 23, 1881
Monmouth	Jackson	129	153	0.56	1.5	July 12, 1894
Monona	Clayton	1,471	1,549	1.17	3.0	May 11, 1897
Monroe	Jasper	1,967	1,830	1.69	4.4	May 1, 1897
Montezuma†	Poweshiek	1,442	1,462	2.48	6.4	February 21, 1868
Monticello	Jones	4,040	3,796	6.29	16.3	September 24, 1889
Montour	Tama	203	249	0.46	1.2	May 4, 1883
Montrose	Lee	738	898	1.12	2.9	1875
Moorhead	Monona	199	226	0.32	0.83	April 9, 1900
Moorland	Webster	168	169	1.48	3.8	October 6, 1902
Moravia	Appanoose; Monroe	637	665	1.12	2.9	September 26, 1881
Morley	Jones	96	115	0.09	0.23	January 26, 1925
Morning Sun	Louisa	752	836	0.8	2.1	June 3, 1867
Morrison	Grundy	98	94	0.1	0.26	April 24, 1884
Moulton	Appanoose	607	605	1.01	2.6	February 24, 1869
Mount Auburn	Benton	162	150	0.28	0.73	November 19, 1906
Mount Ayr†	Ringgold	1,623	1,691	2.67	6.9	June 8, 1875
Mount Pleasant†	Henry	9,274	8,668	8.51	22.0	July 15, 1856
Mount Vernon	Linn	4,527	4,506	3.49	9.0	July 7, 1869
Moville	Woodbury	1,687	1,618	0.89	2.3	August 13, 1889
Murray	Clarke	684	756	0.79	2.0	October 21, 1880
Muscatine†	Muscatine	23,797	22,886	17.3	45	February 1, 1851
Mystic	Appanoose	322	425	2.92	7.6	October 29, 1889
Nashua	Chickasaw; Floyd	1,551	1,663	2.88	7.5	January 29, 1857
Nemaha	Sac	66	85	0.07	0.18	January 27, 1915
Neola	Pottawattamie	918	842	0.46	1.2	March 7, 1882
Nevada†	Story	6,925	6,798	5.06	13.1	October 4, 1869
New Albin	Allamakee	432	522	0.24	0.62	May 20, 1895
New Hampton†	Chickasaw	3,494	3,571	3.16	8.2	April 26, 1873
New Hartford	Butler	570	516	0.5	1.3	December 7, 1883
New Liberty	Scott	138	137	0.1	0.26	June 26, 1909
New London	Henry	1,910	1,897	1.01	2.6	October 22, 1860
New Market	Taylor	385	415	0.44	1.1	December 9, 1882
New Providence	Hardin	236	228	1.01	2.6	January 30, 1893
New Sharon	Mahaska	1,262	1,293	0.94	2.4	July 1, 1871
New Vienna	Dubuque	382	407	0.44	1.1	July 17, 1895
New Virginia	Warren	498	489	0.46	1.2	April 27, 1901
Newell	Buena Vista	906	876	1.27	3.3	September 30, 1876
Newhall	Benton	876	875	0.32	0.83	June 3, 1912
Newton†	Jasper	15,760	15,254	11.19	29.0	January 26, 1857
Nichols	Muscatine	340	374	0.23	0.60	March 15, 1884
Nodaway	Adams	74	114	0.54	1.4	May 28, 1900
Nora Springs	Floyd; Cerro Gordo	1,369	1,431	2.19	5.7	September 17, 1874
North Buena Vista	Clayton	109	121	1.0	2.6	October 25, 1907
North English	Iowa; Keokuk	1,065	1,041	0.55	1.4	March 13, 1891
North Liberty	Johnson	20,479	13,374	7.83	20.3	November 10, 1913
North Washington	Chickasaw	112	117	0.2	0.52	April 16, 1904
Northboro	Page	52	58	0.26	0.67	October 14, 1902
Northwood†	Worth	2,072	1,931	3.76	9.7	June 7, 1875
Norwalk	Warren; Polk	12,799	8,945	10.74	27.8	June 15, 1901
Norway	Benton	466	545	0.45	1.2	December 20, 1894
Numa	Appanoose	68	92	0.44	1.1	November 9, 1909
Oakland	Pottawattamie	1,524	1,527	1.42	3.7	March 14, 1882
Oakland Acres	Jasper	176	156	0.28	0.73	January 22, 1875
Oakville	Louisa	200	173	0.42	1.1	October 27, 1902
Ocheyedan	Osceola	439	490	1.16	3.0	February 20, 1892
Odebolt	Sac	994	1,013	1.05	2.7	June 17, 1878
Oelwein	Fayette	5,920	6,415	4.81	12.5	November 29, 1887
Ogden	Boone	2,007	2,044	1.37	3.5	April 29, 1878
Okoboji	Dickinson	768	807	1.85	4.8	July 28, 1922
Olds	Henry	192	229	0.34	0.88	December 12, 1900
Olin	Jones	651	698	1.03	2.7	November 14, 1879
Ollie	Keokuk	201	215	0.99	2.6	March 1, 1892
Onawa†	Monona	2,906	2,998	5.19	13.4	March 22, 1859
Onslow	Jones	201	197	0.22	0.57	June 20, 1888
Orange City†	Sioux	6,267	6,004	3.94	10.2	February 29, 1884
Orchard	Mitchell	68	71	0.09	0.23	July 10, 1913
Orient	Adair	368	408	0.45	1.2	March 21, 1882
Orleans	Dickinson	521	608	1.08	2.8	July 3, 1895
Osage†	Mitchell	3,627	3,619	2.24	5.8	April 14, 1871
Osceola†	Clarke	5,415	4,929	6.48	16.8	December 24, 1866
Oskaloosa†	Mahaska	11,558	11,463	7.43	19.2	February 4, 1875
Ossian	Winneshiek	802	845	1.11	2.9	February 10, 1876
Osterdock	Clayton	43	59	0.46	1.2	April 16, 1904
Otho	Webster	429	542	0.46	1.2	June 3, 1954
Oto	Woodbury	72	108	0.26	0.67	July 10, 1888
Ottosen	Humboldt	40	55	0.57	1.5	July 16, 1909
Ottumwa†	Wapello	25,529	25,023	15.86	41.1	February 2, 1888
Owasa	Hardin	34	43	0.56	1.5	March 18, 1920
Oxford	Johnson	722	807	0.91	2.4	April 8, 1881
Oxford Junction	Jones	424	496	0.69	1.8	January 15, 1884
Oyens	Plymouth	92	103	0.09	0.23	January 29, 1909
Pacific Junction	Mills	96	471	0.76	2.0	January 11, 1882
Packwood	Jefferson	183	204	0.76	2.0	May 7, 1894
Palmer	Pocahontas	138	165	0.42	1.1	May 21, 1901
Palo	Linn	1,407	1,026	1.43	3.7	April 25, 1905
Panama	Shelby	235	221	0.29	0.75	May 17, 1886
Panora	Guthrie	1,091	1,124	1.8	4.7	July 6, 1872
Panorama Park	Scott	139	129	0.05	0.13	July 7, 1953
Parkersburg	Butler	2,015	1,870	1.42	3.7	December 7, 1874
Parnell	Iowa	194	193	0.17	0.44	March 24, 1891
Paton	Greene	221	236	0.56	1.5	February 20, 1884
Patterson	Madison	176	130	0.2	0.52	December 7, 1877
Paullina	O'Brien	982	1,056	0.85	2.2	October 30, 1883
Pella	Marion	10,464	10,352	8.73	22.6	April 10, 1868
Peosta	Dubuque	1,908	1,377	1.97	5.1	June 16, 1933
Perry	Dallas	7,836	7,702	4.17	10.8	May 18, 1875
Persia	Harrison	297	319	0.47	1.2	April 30, 1891
Peterson	Clay	322	334	0.31	0.80	November 12, 1886
Pierson	Woodbury	337	366	0.62	1.6	November 27, 1891
Pilot Mound	Boone	163	173	0.98	2.5	June 23, 1897
Pisgah	Harrison	249	251	1.01	2.6	July 2, 1904
Plainfield	Bremer	393	436	0.33	0.85	October 17, 1895
Plano	Appanoose	59	70	0.56	1.5	October 5, 1916
Pleasant Hill	Polk	10,147	8,785	9.15	23.7	May 12, 1956
Pleasant Plain	Jefferson	84	93	1.02	2.6	April 12, 1900
Pleasanton	Decatur	32	49	0.35	0.91	February 21, 1884
Pleasantville	Marion	1,676	1,694	2.53	6.6	June 11, 1872
Plover	Pocahontas	50	77	0.54	1.4	October 13, 1916
Plymouth	Cerro Gordo	375	382	0.44	1.1	October 18, 1900
Pocahontas†	Pocahontas	1,867	1,789	2.02	5.2	May 16, 1892
Polk City	Polk	5,543	3,418	4.32	11.2	March 13, 1875
Pomeroy	Calhoun	526	662	2.04	5.3	April 22, 1880
Popejoy	Franklin	77	79	0.74	1.9	July 24, 1908
Portsmouth	Shelby	182	195	0.28	0.73	1883
Postville	Allamakee; Clayton	2,503	2,227	2.11	5.5	March 17, 1873
Prairie City	Jasper	1,700	1,680	1.2	3.1	August 7, 1874
Prairieburg	Linn	160	178	0.46	1.2	March 30, 1905
Prescott	Adams	191	257	0.4	1.0	November 26, 1890
Preston	Jackson	949	1,012	0.96	2.5	November 11, 1890
Primghar†	O'Brien	896	909	1.38	3.6	February 15, 1888
Princeton	Scott	923	886	2.56	6.6	January 29, 1857
Promise City	Wayne	88	111	0.19	0.49	August 23, 1901
Protivin	Howard; Chickasaw	269	283	0.48	1.2	August 1, 1894
Pulaski	Davis	264	260	0.51	1.3	May 3, 1893
Quasqueton	Buchanan	570	554	1.13	2.9	July 1, 1902
Quimby	Cherokee	249	319	0.41	1.1	June 7, 1906
Radcliffe	Hardin	555	545	1.0	2.6	July 8, 1891
Rake	Winnebago	186	225	0.81	2.1	January 20, 1908
Ralston	Carroll; Greene	81	79	1.99	5.2	October 31, 1903
Randall	Hamilton	154	173	0.41	1.1	July 15, 1940
Randolph	Fremont	189	168	0.32	0.83	July 6, 1881
Rathbun	Appanoose	43	89	0.22	0.57	March 1, 1894
Raymond	Black Hawk	759	788	1.63	4.2	May 31, 1956
Readlyn	Bremer	845	808	0.33	0.85	February 1, 1905
Reasnor	Jasper	152	152	0.55	1.4	June 15, 1912
Red Oak†	Montgomery	5,596	5,742	3.95	10.2	June 28, 1869
Redding	Ringgold	63	82	0.99	2.6	April 10, 1882
Redfield	Dallas	731	835	1.4	3.6	March 21, 1881
Reinbeck	Grundy	1,662	1,664	1.82	4.7	May 13, 1878
Rembrandt	Buena Vista	209	203	0.2	0.52	August 12, 1901
Remsen	Plymouth	1,678	1,663	1.27	3.3	1889
Renwick	Humboldt	234	242	1.0	2.6	October 17, 1891
Rhodes	Marshall	271	305	1.01	2.6	May 12, 1882
Riceville	Mitchell; Howard	806	785	1.1	2.8	November 17, 1964
Richland	Keokuk	542	584	0.77	2.0	December 31, 1868
Rickardsville	Dubuque	202	182	0.9	2.3	November 17, 1964
Ricketts	Crawford	109	145	0.26	0.67	March 19, 1902
Ridgeway	Winneshiek	275	315	1.02	2.6	March 15, 1894
Rinard	Calhoun	38	52	1.0	2.6	December 29, 1914
Ringsted	Emmet	365	422	1.08	2.8	March 29, 1900
Rippey	Greene	220	292	0.84	2.2	April 14, 1896 (Note: Formerly incorporated as New Rippey until November 5, 1957.)
Riverdale	Scott	379	405	1.84	4.8	December 27, 1950
Riverside	Washington	1,060	993	1.72	4.5	March 22, 1882
Riverton	Fremont	245	304	0.59	1.5	June 22, 1876
Robins	Linn	3,353	3,142	5.83	15.1	May 3, 1910
Rock Falls	Cerro Gordo	150	155	0.21	0.54	July 17, 1882
Rock Rapids†	Lyon	2,611	2,549	3.96	10.3	April 8, 1885
Rock Valley	Sioux	4,059	3,354	3.22	8.3	November 26, 1886
Rockford	Floyd	758	860	0.63	1.6	March 19, 1878
Rockwell	Cerro Gordo	1,071	1,039	2.98	7.7	July 9, 1881
Rockwell City†	Calhoun	2,240	1,709	4.21	10.9	May 2, 1882
Rodman	Palo Alto	31	45	0.17	0.44	June 17, 1899
Rodney	Monona	45	60	0.16	0.41	February 2, 1892
Roland	Story	1,362	1,284	1.08	2.8	December 29, 1891
Rolfe	Pocahontas	509	584	1.05	2.7	January 4, 1884
Rome	Henry	114	117	0.13	0.34	January 1, 1869
Rose Hill	Mahaska	157	168	0.14	0.36	August 22, 1876
Rossie	Clay	49	70	0.15	0.39	August 30, 1922
Rowan	Wright	123	158	0.49	1.3	December 21, 1901
Rowley	Buchanan	270	264	0.36	0.93	April 20, 1920
Royal	Clay	379	446	0.3	0.78	August 30, 1910
Rudd	Floyd	358	369	0.87	2.3	February 7, 1900
Runnells	Polk	457	507	0.43	1.1	May 21, 1903
Russell	Lucas	472	554	1.04	2.7	April 25, 1887
Ruthven	Palo Alto	725	737	0.42	1.1	March 12, 1885
Rutland	Humboldt	113	126	0.9	2.3	July 6, 1907
Ryan	Delaware	350	361	0.43	1.1	May 6, 1901
Sabula	Jackson	506	576	0.4	1.0	September 1864
Sac City†	Sac	2,063	2,185	4.86	12.6	December 22, 1874
Sageville	Dubuque	95	122	0.69	1.8	June 2, 1933
Salem	Henry	394	383	0.61	1.6	January 24, 1855
Salix	Woodbury	295	363	1.52	3.9	April 19, 1893
Sanborn	O'Brien	1,392	1,404	1.9	4.9	March 15, 1880
Sandyville	Warren	58	51	0.51	1.3	1905
Scarville	Winnebago	74	72	0.08	0.21	April 11, 1904
Schaller	Sac	729	772	1.26	3.3	May 25, 1883
Schleswig	Crawford	830	882	1.3	3.4	February 15, 1900
Scranton	Greene	511	557	1.88	4.9	May 18, 1880
Searsboro	Poweshiek	129	148	0.45	1.2	August 3, 1876
Sergeant Bluff	Woodbury	5,015	4,227	2.11	5.5	May 2, 1904
Seymour	Wayne	634	701	2.35	6.1	February 28, 1874
Shambaugh	Page	159	191	0.36	0.93	April 21, 1903
Shannon City	Union; Ringgold	73	71	0.41	1.1	December 26, 1892
Sharpsburg	Taylor	72	89	0.36	0.93	April 25, 1905
Sheffield	Franklin	1,130	1,172	5.55	14.4	April 8, 1876
Shelby	Shelby; Pottawattamie	727	641	1.74	4.5	November 24, 1877
Sheldahl	Story; Polk; Boone	297	319	0.84	2.2	January 18, 1882
Sheldon	O'Brien; Sioux	5,512	5,188	4.5	12	April 24, 1876
Shell Rock	Butler	1,268	1,296	1.56	4.0	June 1, 1875
Shellsburg	Benton	961	983	0.77	2.0	February 19, 1874
Shenandoah	Page; Fremont	4,925	5,150	3.75	9.7	June 20, 1871
Sherrill	Dubuque	189	177	0.13	0.34	June 29, 1933
Shueyville	Johnson	731	577	1.79	4.6	March 8, 1968
Sibley†	Osceola	2,860	2,798	1.68	4.4	April 5, 1876
Sidney†	Fremont	1,070	1,138	1.38	3.6	May 7, 1870
Sigourney†	Keokuk	2,004	2,059	2.18	5.6	October 4, 1858
Silver City	Mills	245	245	0.22	0.57	June 23, 1883
Sioux Center	Sioux	8,229	7,048	6.31	16.3	October 1, 1891
Sioux City†	Woodbury; Plymouth	85,797	82,684	57.35	148.5	January 16, 1857
Sioux Rapids	Buena Vista	748	775	0.82	2.1	April 6, 1882
Slater	Story	1,543	1,489	1.26	3.3	May 5, 1890
Sloan	Woodbury	1,042	973	0.62	1.6	October 16, 1883
Smithland	Woodbury	181	224	0.37	0.96	May 6, 1889
Soldier	Monona	184	174	0.29	0.75	April 1, 1901
Solon	Johnson	3,018	2,037	1.39	3.6	April 28, 1877
Somers	Calhoun	128	113	0.35	0.91	April 26, 1902
South English	Keokuk	202	212	0.3	0.78	July 13, 1892
Spencer†	Clay	11,325	11,233	11.01	28.5	July 13, 1892
Spillville	Winneshiek	385	367	0.42	1.1	December 5, 1894
Spirit Lake†	Dickinson	5,439	4,840	4.63	12.0	October 14, 1878
Spragueville	Jackson	92	81	0.67	1.7	May 18, 1912
Spring Hill	Warren	68	63	0.12	0.31	November 22, 1881
Springbrook	Jackson	143	144	0.6	1.6	March 2, 1897
Springville	Linn	1,154	1,074	0.72	1.9	January 27, 1882
St. Ansgar	Mitchell	1,160	1,107	1.03	2.7	February 9, 1876
St. Anthony	Marshall	76	102	0.56	1.5	November 6, 1897
St. Charles	Madison	640	653	0.54	1.4	March 15, 1876
St. Donatus	Jackson	120	135	0.37	0.96	June 8, 1964
St. Lucas	Fayette	167	143	0.27	0.70	March 6, 1900
St. Marys	Warren	108	127	0.14	0.36	April 5, 1923
St. Olaf	Clayton	106	108	0.24	0.62	May 31, 1900
St. Paul	Lee	109	129	0.38	0.98	April 1, 1895
Stacyville	Mitchell	458	494	0.51	1.3	March 30, 1900
Stanhope	Hamilton	364	422	0.97	2.5	December 14, 1897
Stanley	Buchanan; Fayette	81	125	0.24	0.62	March 23, 1914
Stanton	Montgomery	678	689	0.92	2.4	March 12, 1883
Stanwood	Cedar	637	684	0.71	1.8	March 29, 1887
State Center	Marshall	1,391	1,468	0.98	2.5	August 26, 1867
Steamboat Rock	Hardin	264	310	0.54	1.4	October 7, 1875
Stockport	Van Buren	272	296	1.03	2.7	January 9, 1903
Stockton	Muscatine	176	197	0.11	0.28	February 11, 1902
Storm Lake†	Buena Vista	11,269	10,600	4.08	10.6	February 28, 1873
Story City	Story	3,352	3,431	2.8	7.3	December 12, 1881
Stout	Grundy	191	224	0.3	0.78	June 25, 1909
Stratford	Hamilton; Webster	707	743	1.91	4.9	September 27, 1883
Strawberry Point	Clayton	1,155	1,279	2.11	5.5	December 19, 1887
Struble	Plymouth	67	78	0.16	0.41	August 17, 1895
Stuart	Guthrie; Adair	1,782	1,648	2.58	6.7	February 6, 1887
Sully	Jasper	881	821	0.58	1.5	February 23, 1901
Sumner	Bremer; Fayette	2,021	2,028	2.52	6.5	June 1, 1894
Superior	Dickinson	132	130	0.41	1.1	December 11, 1895
Sutherland	O'Brien	629	649	0.87	2.3	October 29, 1883
Swaledale	Cerro Gordo	144	165	0.24	0.62	March 31, 1892
Swea City	Kossuth	566	536	0.74	1.9	May 7, 1895
Swisher	Johnson	914	879	0.82	2.1	July 25, 1933
Tabor	Fremont; Mills	928	1,040	1.29	3.3	October 5, 1868
Tama	Tama	3,130	2,877	3.26	8.4	March 16, 1887
Templeton	Carroll	352	362	0.43	1.1	September 28, 1883
Tennant	Shelby	78	68	0.71	1.8	April 23, 1915
Terril	Dickinson	334	367	0.55	1.4	December 30, 1899
Thayer	Union	51	59	0.09	0.23	May 11, 1894
Thompson	Winnebago	495	502	0.88	2.3	February 24, 1894
Thor	Humboldt	181	186	1.0	2.6	April 23, 1900
Thornburg	Keokuk	45	67	0.2	0.52	September 25, 1883
Thornton	Cerro Gordo	400	422	1.25	3.2	August 22, 1892
Thurman	Fremont	167	229	0.56	1.5	February 10, 1879
Tiffin	Johnson	4,512	1,947	4.13	10.7	December 27, 1906
Tingley	Ringgold	136	184	0.68	1.8	June 17, 1884
Tipton†	Cedar	3,149	3,221	2.09	5.4	January 27, 1857
Titonka	Kossuth	511	476	0.28	0.73	February 1, 1900
Toledo†	Tama	2,369	2,258	2.3	6.0	January 1, 1866
Toronto	Clinton	102	124	0.19	0.49	July 26, 1909
Traer	Tama	1,583	1,703	1.18	3.1	January 18, 1875
Treynor	Pottawattamie	1,032	919	0.58	1.5	August 24, 1904
Tripoli	Bremer	1,191	1,313	1.41	3.7	October 16, 1894
Truesdale	Buena Vista	69	81	0.14	0.36	May 15, 1917
Truro	Madison	509	485	0.97	2.5	February 24, 1902
Turin	Monona	72	68	0.09	0.23	April 6, 1900
Udell	Appanoose	28	47	0.32	0.83	April 9, 1903
Underwood	Pottawattamie	954	917	0.46	1.2	January 28, 1902
Union	Hardin	399	397	0.55	1.4	October 26, 1874
Unionville	Appanoose	75	102	0.74	1.9	July 1, 1922
University Heights	Johnson	1,228	1,051	0.27	0.70	August 13, 1935
University Park	Mahaska	487	487	0.77	2.0	April 13, 1909
Urbana	Benton	1,554	1,458	2.2	5.7	November 4, 1892
Urbandale	Polk; Dallas	45,580	39,463	21.92	56.8	May 3, 1917
Ute	Monona	338	374	0.39	1.0	November 4, 1892
Vail	Crawford	396	436	0.57	1.5	October 1, 1875
Valeria	Jasper	39	57	0.05	0.13	December 9, 1912
Van Horne	Benton	774	682	0.63	1.6	June 13, 1883
Van Meter	Dallas	1,484	1,016	1.28	3.3	December 29, 1877
Van Wert	Decatur	178	230	0.33	0.85	March 4, 1891
Varina	Pocahontas	68	71	0.27	0.70	March 29, 1901
Ventura	Cerro Gordo	711	717	1.77	4.6	May 28, 1960
Victor	Iowa; Poweshiek	875	893	0.48	1.2	November 30, 1868
Villisca	Montgomery	1,132	1,252	1.9	4.9	September 3, 1869
Vincent	Webster	130	174	0.25	0.65	May 27, 1898
Vining	Tama	54	50	0.57	1.5	May 26, 1913
Vinton†	Benton	4,938	5,257	4.74	12.3	July 17, 1869
Volga	Clayton	203	208	0.78	2.0	October 16, 1895
Wadena	Fayette	209	262	0.74	1.9	July 11, 1895
Wahpeton	Dickinson	345	341	1.21	3.1	June 24, 1933
Walcott	Scott; Muscatine	1,551	1,629	3.47	9.0	July 10, 1894
Walford	Benton; Linn	1,366	1,463	1.11	2.9	April 15, 1954
Walker	Linn	688	791	0.76	2.0	June 13, 1891
Wall Lake	Sac	755	819	1.23	3.2	December 7, 1880
Wallingford	Emmet	165	197	0.97	2.5	November 4, 1913
Walnut	Pottawattamie	747	785	2.15	5.6	October 2, 1877
Wapello†	Louisa	2,084	2,067	1.29	3.3	July 15, 1856
Washington†	Washington	7,352	7,266	4.92	12.7	June 6, 1864
Washta	Cherokee	209	248	1.04	2.7	June 6, 1890
Waterloo†	Black Hawk	67,314	68,406	61.39	159.0	July 1, 1868
Waterville	Allamakee	109	144	0.43	1.1	June 18, 1912
Waucoma	Fayette	229	257	0.43	1.1	June 5, 1883
Waukee	Dallas	23,940	13,790	12.97	33.6	December 23, 1878
Waukon†	Allamakee	3,827	3,897	2.82	7.3	April 4, 1883
Waverly†	Bremer	10,394	9,874	11.01	28.5	March 2, 1859
Wayland	Henry	964	966	1.01	2.6	February 5, 1890
Webb	Clay	138	141	0.5	1.3	April 9, 1901
Webster	Keokuk	94	88	0.32	0.83	April 13, 1909
Webster City†	Hamilton	7,825	8,070	8.86	22.9	September 16, 1874
Weldon	Decatur	136	125	0.18	0.47	October 20, 1902
Wellman	Washington	1,524	1,408	1.14	3.0	October 28, 1885
Wellsburg	Grundy	720	707	1.09	2.8	March 28, 1896
Welton	Clinton	121	165	0.27	0.70	April 25, 1908
Wesley	Kossuth	391	390	0.58	1.5	April 13, 1892
West Bend	Palo Alto; Kossuth	791	785	0.89	2.3	February 27, 1884
West Branch	Cedar; Johnson	2,509	2,322	3.19	8.3	April 12, 1875
West Burlington	Des Moines	3,197	2,968	4.95	12.8	December 15, 1883
West Chester	Washington	144	146	0.25	0.65	April 17, 1899
West Des Moines	Polk; Dallas; Warren	68,723	56,609	38.59	99.9	November 16, 1893
West Liberty	Muscatine	3,858	3,736	1.73	4.5	July 1, 1867
West Okoboji	Dickinson	308	289	1.28	3.3	December 17, 1924
West Point	Lee	921	966	0.61	1.6	March 25, 1858
West Union†	Fayette	2,490	2,486	2.78	7.2	December 9, 1879
Westfield	Plymouth	123	132	0.13	0.34	May 27, 1903
Westgate	Fayette	192	211	0.36	0.93	July 6, 1896
Westphalia	Shelby	126	127	0.1	0.26	November 7, 1919
Westside	Crawford	285	299	1.47	3.8	1871
Westwood	Henry	101	112	0.15	0.39	January 14, 1982
What Cheer	Keokuk	607	646	1.22	3.2	February 27, 1880
Wheatland	Clinton	775	764	0.6	1.6	July 13, 1869
Whiting	Monona	745	762	1.0	2.6	May 15, 1883
Whittemore	Kossuth	497	504	0.42	1.1	November 19, 1891
Whitten	Hardin	100	149	0.54	1.4	March 13, 1896
Willey	Carroll	73	88	0.25	0.65	February 29, 1912
Williams	Hamilton	307	344	0.87	2.3	September 13, 1883
Williamsburg	Iowa	3,346	3,068	3.74	9.7	December 3, 1884
Williamson	Lucas	120	152	0.32	0.83	June 14, 1922
Wilton	Muscatine; Cedar	2,924	2,802	1.95	5.1	February 12, 1878
Windsor Heights	Polk	5,252	4,860	1.41	3.7	July 19, 1941
Winfield	Henry	1,033	1,134	1.05	2.7	March 27, 1882
Winterset†	Madison	5,353	5,190	4.58	11.9	January 16, 1857
Winthrop	Buchanan	823	850	0.84	2.2	June 7, 1886
Wiota	Cass	91	116	0.32	0.83	January 16, 1884
Woden	Hancock	188	229	0.42	1.1	January 7, 1904
Woodbine	Harrison	1,625	1,459	1.28	3.3	November 9, 1877
Woodburn	Clarke	146	202	0.64	1.7	February 12, 1878
Woodward	Dallas; Boone	1,346	1,024	2.46	6.4	October 13, 1883
Woolstock	Wright	144	168	1.06	2.7	April 19, 1895
Worthington	Dubuque	382	401	0.38	0.98	January 10, 1893
Wyoming	Jones	523	515	0.51	1.3	October 21, 1873
Yale	Guthrie	267	246	0.27	0.70	November 27, 1901
Yetter	Calhoun	19	34	0.13	0.34	January 11, 1904
Yorktown	Page	60	85	0.27	0.70	March 25, 1899
Zearing	Story	528	554	0.75	1.9	February 6, 1883
Zwingle	Dubuque; Jackson	84	91	0.16	0.41	December 17, 1900

== See also ==
- Iowa census statistical areas
- List of census-designated places in Iowa
- List of counties in Iowa
- List of unincorporated communities in Iowa
- List of townships in Iowa

== Discontinued cities ==
Name	County	Discontinuance Year	Population at Discontinuance	Current Population^{ε}	Coordinates						
Name	County	Discontinuance Year	Population at Discontinuance	Current Population^{ε}	Coordinates	Athelstan	Taylor	2004	25^{γ}	6	40°34′22″N 94°32′33″W
Center Junction	Jones	2015	111^{δ}	100	42°6′59″N 91°5′17″W						
Conway	Taylor	2026	17^{ε}	17	40°44′57″N 94°37′20″W						
Delphos	Ringgold	2017	25^{δ}	26	40°39′47″N 94°20′25″W						
Donnan	Fayette	1991	7^{β}		42°53′46″N 91°52′41″W						
Green Island	Jackson	1993	54^{β}		42°09′13″N 90°19′19″W						
Hepburn	Page	2022	26^{ε}	26	40°50′51″N 95°01′00″W						
Hurstville	Jackson	1985			42°05′38″N 90°40′55″W						
Kent	Union	2003	52^{γ}	37	40°57′13″N 94°27′40″W						
Littleport	Clayton	2005	26^{γ}		42°45′13″N 91°22′8″W						
Millville	Clayton	2014	30^{δ}		42°42′15″N 91°4′34″W						
Moneta	O'Brien	1999	29^{β}		43°07′45″N 95°23′26″W						
Mount Sterling	Van Buren	2012	36^{δ}	33	40°37′5″N 91°56′2″W						
Mount Union	Henry	2017	107^{δ}	120	41°03′28″N 91°23′29″W						
Oneida	Delaware	1994	49^{β}		42°32′34″N 91°21′13″W						
Pioneer	Humboldt	2020	4^{ε}		42°39′16″N 94°23′27″W						
Plainview	Scott	1987	45^{α}	19	41°40′02″N 90°46′48″W						
Randalia	Fayette	2024	50^{ε}	50	42°51′48″N 91°53′12″W						
Swan	Marion	2025	76^{ε}	76	41°28′03″N 93°18′34″W						

^α per the 1980 US census
^β per the 1990 US census
^γ per the 2000 US census
^δ per the 2010 US census
^ε per the 2020 US census
