= Hindu Temple and Cultural Center of Iowa =

Hindu temple in Madrid, Iowa US

Coordinates: 41.811423°N 93.818584°W

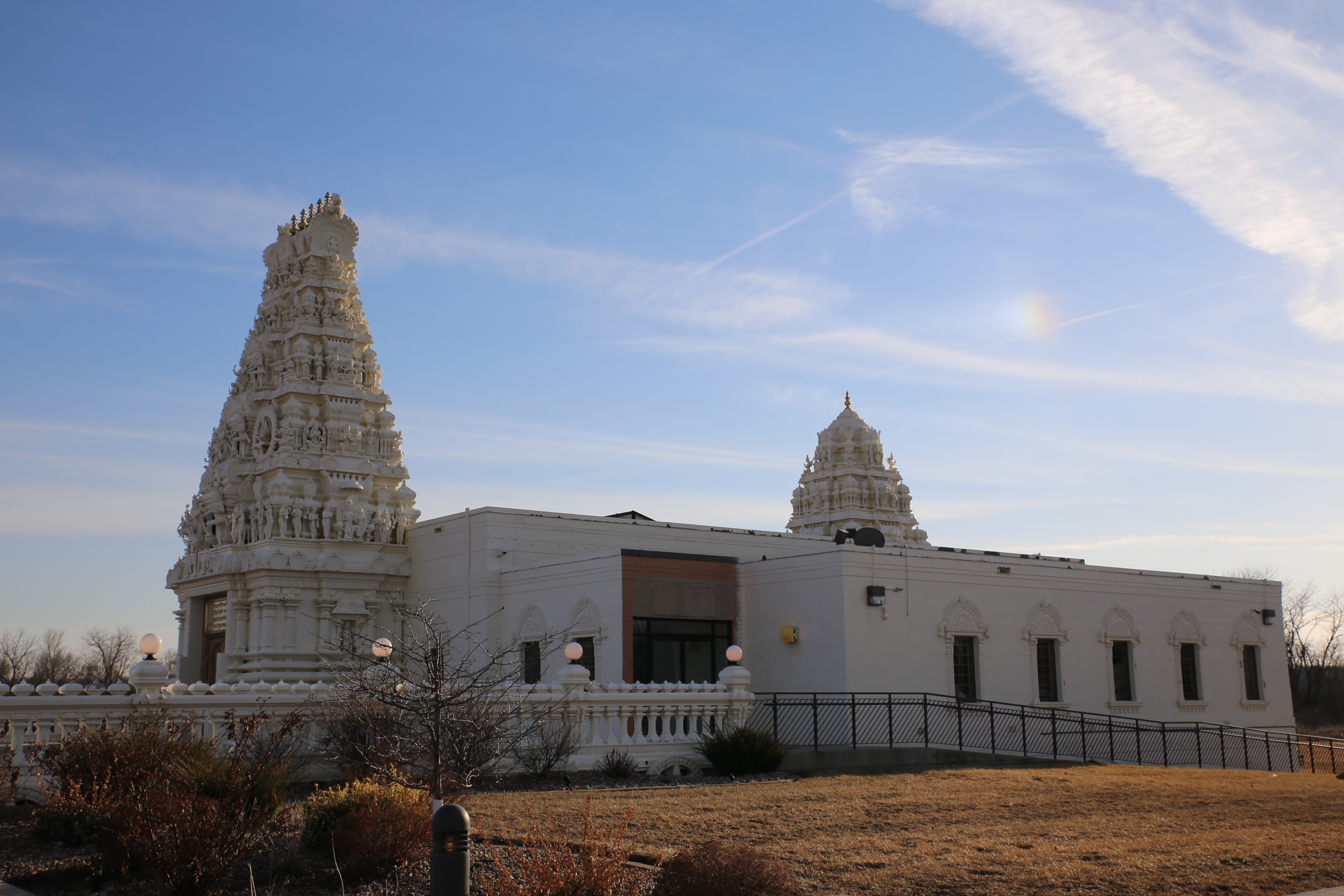

- Location within Iowa

Religion
- Affiliation: Hinduism
- Deity: Vishnu

Location
- Location: Madrid
- State: Iowa
- Country: United States
- Interactive map of Hindu Temple and Cultural Center of Iowa

Architecture
- Completed: June 2005

Website
- www.iowatemple.org

Drone footage of Hindu Temple & Cultural Center of Iowa

Hindu Temple and Cultural Center of Iowa is a Hindu Temple located in Madrid, Iowa. It is the first Hindu temple to be built in Iowa.

== History ==
The idea to build a temple first came about in the late 1990s by local Hindus in the Madrid area. The Suhai family initially raised $25,000 and eventually the Hindu community managed to raise over 1.2 million dollars. The temple construction was completed in June 2005.
