= Douglas Township, Boone County, Iowa =

Township in Iowa, US

Douglas Township, Boone County
- Township
- Coordinates: 41°54′41″N 093°51′00″W
- Country: United States
- State: Iowa
- County: Boone

Area
  - Total: 17.40 sq mi (45.06 km^{2})
  - Land: 17.24 sq mi (44.66 km^{2})
  - Water: 0.15 sq mi (0.4 km^{2})
- Elevation: 1,030 ft (314 m)

Population (2000)
  - Total: 2,344
  - Density: 136/sq mi (52.5/km^{2})
- FIPS code: 19-91029
- GNIS feature ID: 0467725

Douglas Township is one of seventeen townships in Boone County, Iowa, United States. As of the 2000 census, its population was 2,344.

== History ==
Douglas Township was established in 1858.

== Geography ==
Douglas Township covers an area of 17.4 square miles (45 km^{2}) and contains one incorporated settlement, Madrid. According to the USGS, it contains four cemeteries: Cassel, Dalander, Fairview and Mount Hope.
