= Green Island, Iowa =

- Unincorporated Community
- Location within Iowa Location within the United States
- Coordinates: 42°09′13″N 90°19′19″W
- Country: United States
- State: Iowa
- County: Jackson

Area
  - Water: 0 sq mi (0 km^{2}) 0%
- Elevation: 614 ft (187 m)
- Time zone: UTC-6 (CST)
  - Summer (DST): UTC-5 (CDT)
- ZIP code: 52064
- Area code: 563

Green Island is an unincorporated settlement and former city in Jackson County, Iowa, United States.

Contrary to the name, Green Island is not an island.

== History ==
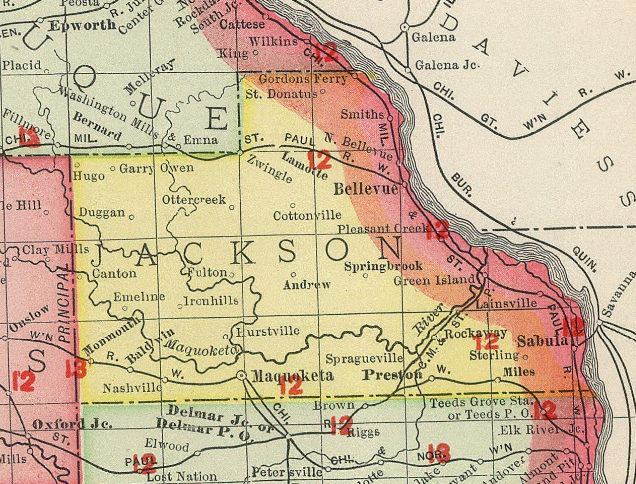
Green Island in Jackson County, Iowa, in 1903

Historical population
Census	Pop.	Note	%±
1910	128		—
1920	132		3.1%
1930	116		−12.1%
1940	148		27.6%
1950	120		−18.9%
1960	97		−19.2%
1970	112		15.5%
1980	103		−8.0%
1990	54		−47.6%
U.S. Decennial Census

Founded in the 1800s, Green Island's population was 125 in 1902, and 132 in 1925.

Green Island was an incorporated community until 1993.

== See also ==
- List of Discontinued cities in Iowa
