= Newton Arboretum and Botanical Gardens =

Arboretum and botanical gardens in Newton, Iowa, United States

Coordinates: 41.703°N 93.016°W

- Interactive map of Newton Arboretum and Botanical Gardens
- Website: Official website

The Newton Arboretum and Botanical Gardens is a 501(c)(3) nonprofit, privately managed public 6-acre arboretum and botanical gardens, in Newton, Iowa.

The gardens were first proposed in 1995, in 1996 the plans were finalised and 102 trees were planted in May 1996.

The gardens include demonstration beds including three annual beds, a mixed perennial bed, an ornamental grass bed, a rose bed, two woody shrub beds, a shade garden, a tulip bed, a rose bed, a butterfly garden, a water garden, and a native prairie.

== See also ==
- List of botanical gardens in the United States
