= Bickelhaupt Arboretum =

Arboretum in Clinton, Iowa, United States

Coordinates: 41.8408°N 90.2194°W

- Interactive map of Bickelhaupt Arboretum
- Website: Official website

Bickelhaupt Arboretum (14 acres) is a non-profit arboretum located in Clinton, Iowa. The arboretum is open from dawn to dusk throughout the year and is maintained under the auspices of the Clinton Community College.

== History ==
The arboretum was established by Bob and Frances Bickelhaupt around their home and given to the public in 1970. They created the arboretum to "demonstrate how well hundreds of certain plants would stand up in the area, and how they should be cared for."

The Bickelhaupts grouped tree plantings by genus and each plant is labeled. Major collections include maple (Acer), birch (Betula), hickory (Carya), beech (Fagus), ash (Fraxinus), honeylocust (Gleditsia), magnolia (Magnolia), ornamental crabapple (Malus), oak (Quercus), linden (Tilia) and elm (Ulmus). Other specimens include alders (Alnus), pecan (Carya illinoinensis), hackberry (Celtis occidentalis), dogwoods (Cornus), ginkgo (Ginkgo biloba), thornless honeylocust (Gleditsia triacanthos var. inermis), Kentucky coffeetree (Gymnocladus dioicus), black tupelo (Nyssa), swamp white oak (Quercus bicolor), willows (Salix), and baldcypress (Taxodium). The arboretum also includes conifer specimens of spruce, pine, fir, douglas fir and larch.

In 2025, the Bickelhaupt House underwent renovations to enable it to host events, as well as to create a platform that overlooks the landscape. A new library and classrooms were added to "support research, workshops, and interactive experiences." Also included in the refurbishment was the transformation of the house's pool into a display of glass art by non-profit Hot Glass.

== Collections ==
The arboretum's collection of garden conifers contains over 600 accessions from 14 genera hardy in USDA Hardiness Zones 4a to 6a, each labeled with botanical and common names. These including over 100 one-of-a-kind Witches' Brooms, of which 3 are naturally occurring. The arboretum also includes a selection of ornamental shrubs with major collections including boxwood (Buxus), hydrangea, roses (Rosa), lilacs (Syringa), and viburnum.

The arboretum's grounds also include a butterfly garden, a country garden, a daylily (Hemerocallis) collection (including 54 Stout Medal winners), the Mercy Hospice Herb Garden (featuring more than 60 herb specimens), the National Hosta Display Garden (featuring over 200 cultivars), perennials, prairie grasses, a rock garden and a wildflower garden.

== See also ==
- List of botanical gardens in the United States
