= Iowa Arboretum =

Arboretum and gardens in Madrid, Iowa, United States

Coordinates: 41.9381°N 93.8600°W

The Iowa Arboretum & Gardens
- Interactive map of The Iowa Arboretum & Gardens
- Type: Arboretum
- Motto: Celebrating Trees, Plants, and Nature Every Day
- Location: 1875 Peach Avenue, Madrid, Iowa 50156
- Area: 170 acres (69 ha)
- Established: 1968
- Founder: Iowa State Horticultural Society
- Paths: 2.25 miles
- Plants: 6,000
- Website: Official website

The Iowa Arboretum & Gardens is a nonprofit Arboretum located in Madrid, Iowa that encompasses 170 acres (69 ha).

The Iowa State Horticultural Society decided in 1966 on its 100th anniversary to start an Arboretum to serve all of Iowa. A 40-acre parcel of land was purchased in 1968. The deed for the land was paid off in 1972.

The Iowa Arboretum & Gardens is a community-supported public garden inspiring curiosity, discovery, and appreciation of the natural landscape.

The Arboretum contains hundreds of species of trees, shrubs, and perennials that can be found in individual gardens or collections on the main 40 acre campus. Specialty gardens include: Butterfly Garden, Children's Garden, Conifer Garden, Founders Grove, Herb Garden, Hostas, Large Deciduous Trees, Medium Deciduous Trees, Nut Trees, Perennial Garden, Shade Garden, Windbreak, Viburnums, and Irises. In addition, the Arboretum contains more than 120 acres (49 ha) of native timber with woodland trails, ravines, stream, and prairies.

Treehouse Village located along the first woodland trail across from the Arboretum's main campus opened in September 2024 with elevated treehouse experiences, a suspension bridge, and a play area.

== See also ==
- List of botanical gardens in the United States
