= Lilac Arboretum and Children's Forest =

Arboretum in Des Moines, Iowa

Coordinates: 41.536°N 93.579°W

The Lilac Arboretum and Children's Forest, sometimes also known as the Ewing Lilac Arboretum, is located in Ewing Park at 5300 Indianola Avenue, Des Moines, Iowa.

The arboretum contains more than 1,400 lilac bushes representing 120 varieties.

== See also ==
- List of botanical gardens in the United States
