= List of Iowa locations by per capita income =

Iowa is the thirty-first richest state in the United States of America, with a per capita income of $19,674 (2000).

== Iowa counties by per capita income ==
Note: Data is from the 2010 United States Census Data and the 2006-2010 American Community Survey 5-Year Estimates.

Rank	County	Per capita income	Median household income	Median family income	Population	Number of households
1	Dallas	$33,051	$67,037	$84,018	66,135	25,240
2	Dickinson	$29,459	$50,174	$59,648	16,667	7,554
3	Polk	$29,246	$56,094	$70,445	430,640	170,197
4	Warren	$28,798	$62,034	$74,042	46,225	17,262
5	Linn	$28,239	$53,674	$69,250	211,226	86,134
6	Plymouth	$28,060	$56,379	$69,261	24,986	9,875
7	Johnson	$28,008	$51,380	$74,547	130,882	52,715
8	Kossuth	$27,415	$48,277	$61,012	15,543	6,697
9	Scott	$27,408	$49,964	$64,513	165,224	66,765
	United States	$27,334	$51,914	$62,982	308,745,538	116,716,292
10	Worth	$27,240	$49,673	$56,659	7,598	3,172
11	Grundy	$26,916	$56,184	$68,151	12,453	5,131
12	Iowa County	$26,721	$56,053	$64,578	16,355	6,677
13	Guthrie	$26,590	$50,090	$61,951	10,954	4,544
14	Bremer	$26,522	$55,676	$68,602	24,276	9,385
15	Boone	$25,998	$49,578	$66,872	26,306	10,728
16	Madison	$25,711	$53,183	$67,099	15,679	6,025
17	Cerro Gordo	$25,463	$44,741	$60,148	44,151	19,350
18	Story	$25,450	$48,248	$74,278	89,542	34,736
19	Mills	$25,400	$59,481	$73,532	15,059	5,605
20	Clay	$25,398	$43,542	$56,460	16,667	7,282
	Iowa State	$25,335	$48,872	$61,804	3,046,355	1,221,576
21	Poweshiek	$25,218	$50,998	$65,744	18,914	7,555
22	Benton	$25,111	$54,726	$64,970	26,076	10,302
23	Carroll	$25,094	$47,507	$61,960	20,816	8,683
24	Dubuque	$25,045	$48,573	$61,138	93,653	36,815
25	O'Brien	$24,771	$44,018	$59,391	14,398	6,069
26	Hamilton	$24,765	$46,188	$61,472	15,673	6,540
27	Cedar	$24,742	$54,321	$63,893	18,499	7,511
28	Marion	$24,613	$53,370	$65,817	33,309	12,723
29	Humboldt	$24,568	$45,282	$57,063	9,815	4,209
30	Cherokee	$24,507	$44,635	$56,696	12,072	5,207
31	Emmet	$24,371	$42,286	$55,844	10,302	4,236
32	Harrison	$24,221	$51,303	$63,283	14,928	5,987
33	Audubon	$24,207	$42,717	$58,641	6,119	2,617
34	Hardin	$24,154	$44,694	$57,612	17,534	7,296
35	Muscatine	$24,138	$51,025	$61,445	42,745	16,412
36	Butler	$24,030	$47,702	$59,641	14,867	6,120
37	Washington	$23,979	$50,710	$60,466	21,704	8,741
38	Greene	$23,947	$43,286	$60,133	9,336	3,996
39	Jefferson	$23,853	$44,167	$55,352	16,843	6,846
40	Ida	$23,841	$44,521	$58,635	7,089	3,052
41	Sac	$23,837	$42,986	$54,304	10,350	4,482
42	Pottawattamie	$23,782	$48,728	$60,354	93,158	36,775
43	Fremont	$23,612	$47,225	$59,622	7,441	3,064
44	Winneshiek	$23,608	$50,693	$61,558	21,056	7,997
45	Clinton	$23,573	$46,170	$58,681	49,116	20,223
46	Adams	$23,549	$40,368	$52,782	4,029	1,715
47	Adair	$23,497	$45,202	$57,287	7,682	3,292
48	Buchanan	$23,437	$51,961	$61,421	20,958	8,161
49	Pocahontas	$23,385	$42,105	$56,250	7,310	3,233
50	Black Hawk	$23,357	$44,178	$57,495	131,090	52,470
51	Clarke	$23,271	$45,596	$54,707	9,286	3,701
52	Jasper	$23,160	$46,396	$56,484	36,842	14,806
53	Palo Alto	$23,071	$42,800	$57,208	9,421	3,994
54	Wright	$23,068	$44,035	$53,890	13,229	5,625
55	Osceola	$23,063	$43,889	$58,286	6,462	2,682
56	Henry	$23,056	$41,983	$53,985	20,145	7,666
57	Calhoun	$23,049	$41,611	$50,037	9,670	4,242
58	Tama	$23,041	$46,288	$55,011	17,767	6,947
59	Jackson	$23,008	$42,489	$54,210	19,848	8,289
60	Jones	$22,873	$47,955	$59,167	20,638	8,181
61	Mitchell	$22,820	$48,506	$63,356	10,776	4,395
62	Monona	$22,774	$41,398	$51,098	9,243	4,050
63	Hancock	$22,713	$47,318	$55,922	11,341	4,741
64	Winnebago	$22,684	$41,871	$58,700	10,866	4,597
65	Webster	$22,653	$40,806	$54,129	38,013	15,580
66	Delaware	$22,578	$47,078	$59,802	17,764	7,062
67	Des Moines	$22,555	$41,937	$53,946	40,325	17,003
68	Franklin	$22,507	$44,863	$52,917	10,680	4,332
69	Chickasaw	$22,447	$41,372	$50,530	12,439	5,204
70	Howard	$22,417	$46,068	$55,582	9,566	3,944
71	Marshall	$22,407	$45,232	$55,716	40,648	15,538
72	Shelby	$22,389	$44,085	$55,523	12,167	5,085
73	Wapello	$22,376	$40,093	$49,309	35,625	14,552
74	Clayton	$22,303	$45,873	$53,905	18,129	7,599
75	Keokuk	$22,088	$42,698	$53,456	10,511	4,408
76	Woodbury	$22,069	$44,343	$55,957	102,172	39,052
77	Davis	$21,970	$46,597	$52,855	8,753	3,201
78	Ringgold	$21,858	$42,336	$51,269	5,131	2,047
79	Cass	$21,787	$40,820	$48,884	13,956	5,980
80	Lyon	$21,613	$49,506	$57,348	11,581	4,442
81	Mahaska	$21,568	$45,025	$57,877	22,381	8,975
82	Fayette	$21,566	$41,055	$52,627	20,880	8,634
83	Floyd	$21,416	$39,467	$52,808	16,303	6,886
84	Allamakee	$21,349	$46,623	$55,926	14,330	5,845
85	Taylor	$21,335	$40,300	$48,156	6,317	2,679
86	Sioux	$21,333	$51,557	$60,043	33,704	11,584
87	Lee	$21,324	$42,444	$50,630	35,862	14,610
88	Montgomery	$21,301	$38,624	$50,595	10,740	4,558
89	Buena Vista	$21,256	$43,182	$53,382	20,260	7,522
90	Monroe	$21,228	$43,245	$53,052	7,970	3,213
91	Page	$21,204	$40,778	$52,791	15,932	6,393
92	Crawford	$21,181	$44,377	$53,794	17,096	6,413
93	Union	$20,435	$40,879	$50,546	12,534	5,271
94	Louisa	$20,367	$50,457	$54,923	11,387	4,346
95	Van Buren	$20,209	$40,073	$50,064	7,570	3,108
96	Appanoose	$20,084	$34,689	$41,250	12,887	5,627
97	Lucas	$19,967	$43,005	$56,647	8,898	3,689
98	Wayne	$18,795	$35,425	$44,784	6,403	2,652
99	Decatur	$18,195	$37,138	$48,015	8,457	3,223
