= Madrid, Iowa =

- City
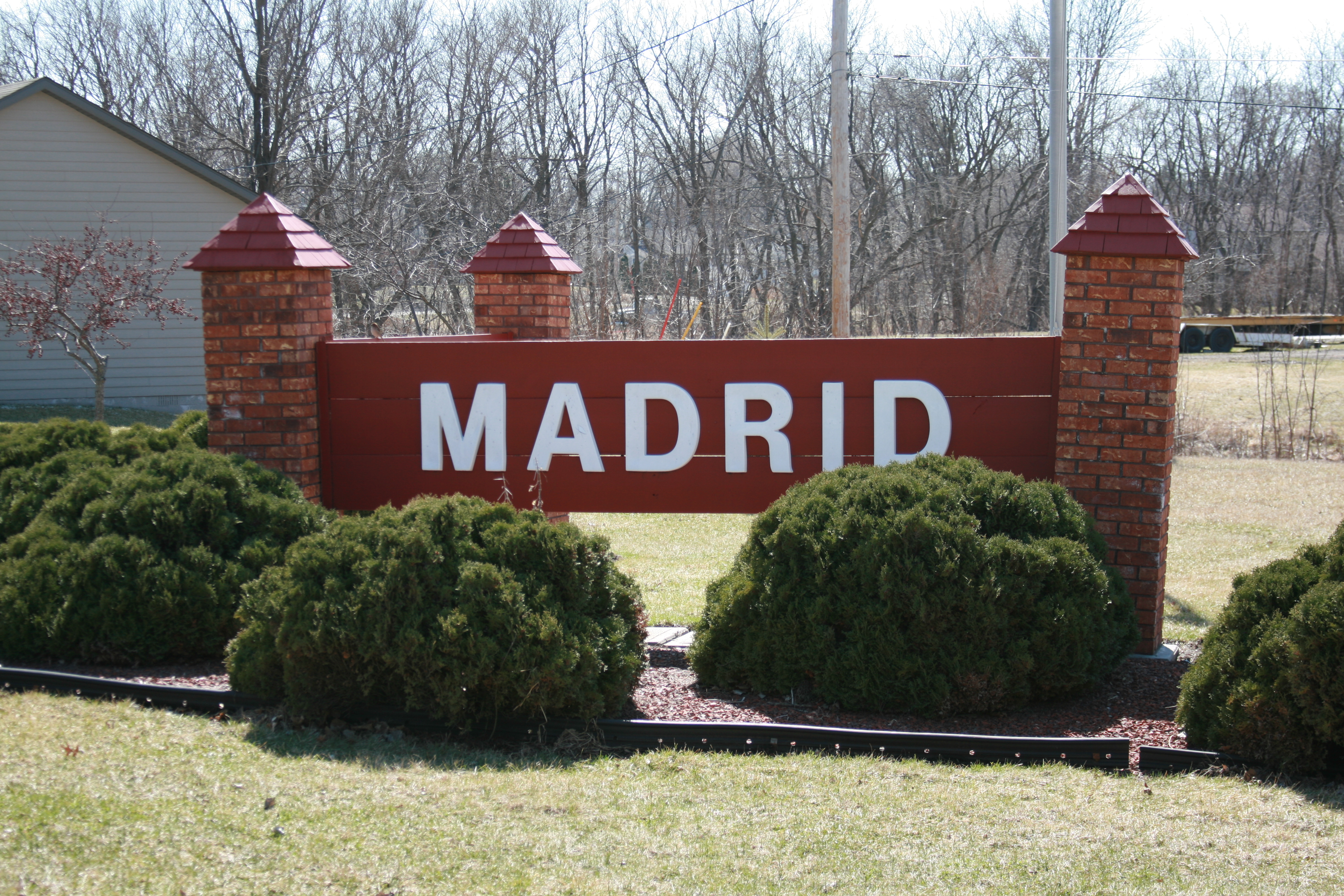
- Sign in Madrid

- Flag

- Location of Madrid, Iowa
- Coordinates: 41°52′25″N 93°49′13″W
- Country: United States
- State: Iowa
- County: Boone
- Township: Douglas

Area
  - Total: 1.22 sq mi (3.17 km^{2})
  - Land: 1.22 sq mi (3.17 km^{2})
  - Water: 0 sq mi (0.00 km^{2})
- Elevation: 1,017 ft (310 m)

Population (2020)
  - Total: 2,802
  - Density: 2,288.6/sq mi (883.64/km^{2})
- Time zone: UTC-6 (Central (CST))
  - Summer (DST): UTC-5 (CDT)
- ZIP code: 50156
- Area code: 515
- FIPS code: 19-48450
- GNIS feature ID: 2395812
- Website: madridiowa.org

Madrid (/ˈmædrɪd/ MAD-rid) is a city in Douglas Township, Boone County, Iowa, United States. The population was 2,802 at the time of the 2020 census. It is part of the Boone, Iowa Micropolitan Statistical Area, which is a part of the larger Ames-Boone, Iowa Combined Statistical Area.

== Geography ==
According to the United States Census Bureau, the city has a total area of 1.19 square miles (3.08 km^{2}), all land.

== History ==
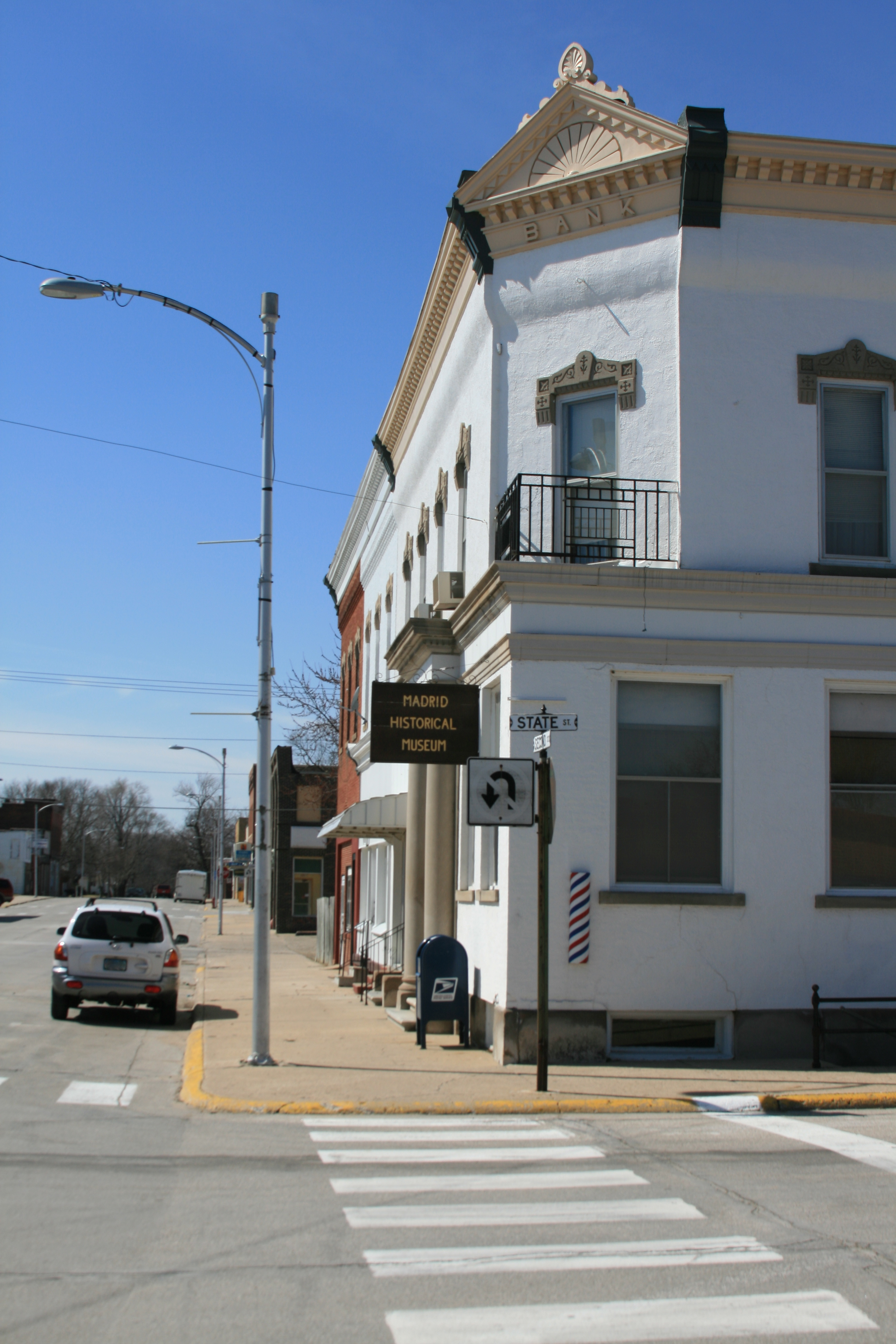
Madrid Historical Museum

Madrid was a small coal mining community during the winter and a farming community during the summer. Mining became a larger part of its economy as time went on. Initially, coal was used locally for winter heating, hence the reason for it being considered a part-time job by most residents. The Carpenter Coal Company opened a mine between Madrid and Woodward in 1901, and the Reese Brothers Coal Company opened two mine shafts near Madrid. The Carpenter Brothers named their coal camp Scandia, and changed their corporate name to match. By 1914, The Scandia Coal Company of Madrid produced over 100,000 tons of coal per year, ranking among the top 24 coal producers in the state. In 1912, Locals 709 and 2460 of the United Mine Workers union, both based in Madrid, had an aggregate membership of 397, representing about 1/3 of the total population in 1910.

Madrid gained a large Italian and Croatian population who worked in its coal mines during the 1920s and 1930s. In 2017 the town was featured in an episode of Madrid de sol a sol, a show from Spanish public channel Telemadrid exploring locations named "Madrid".

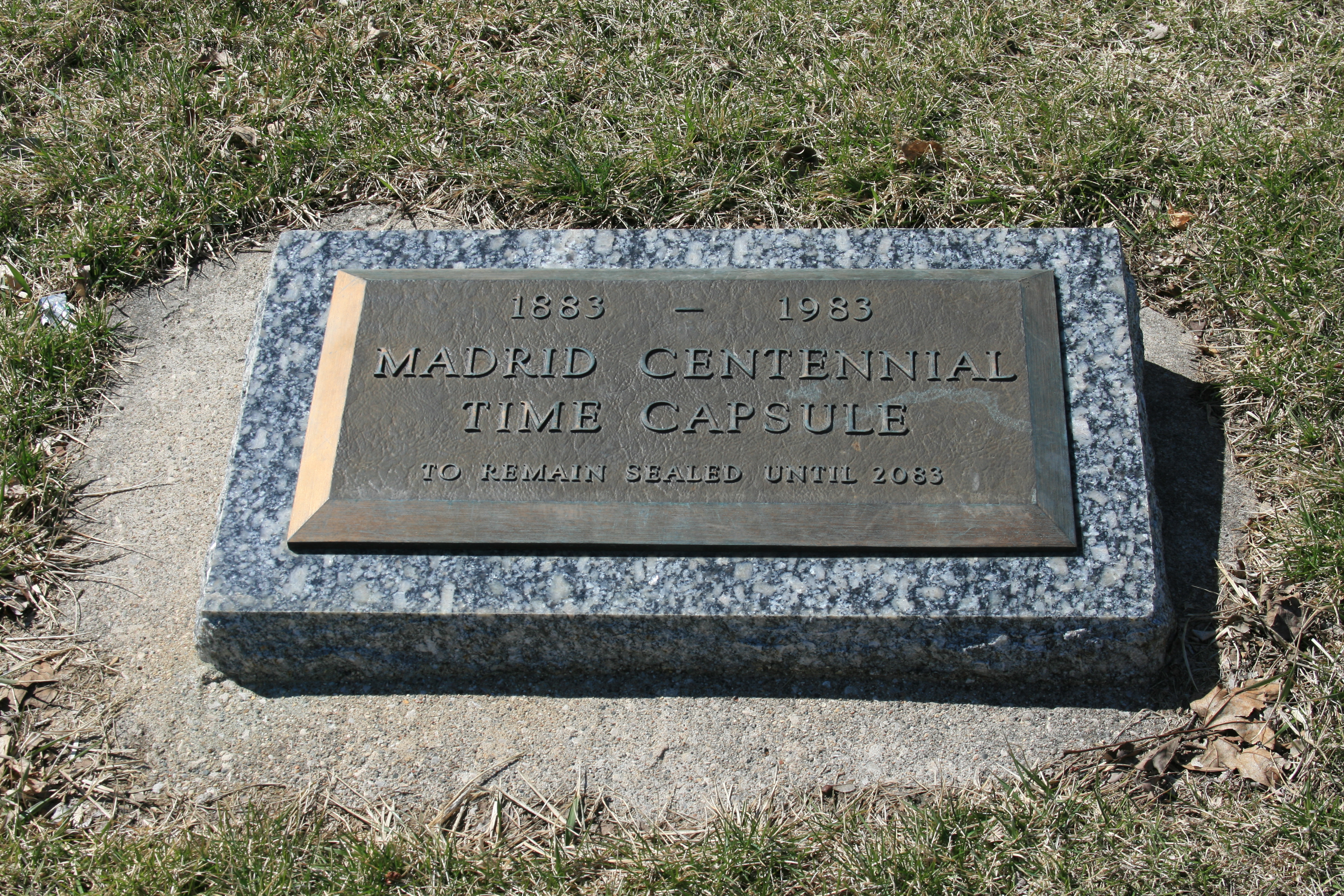
Madrid Centennial Time Capsule

== Public safety ==
Madrid is served by a volunteer fire department, as well as a police department.

== Demographics ==
Historical populations
Year	Pop.	±%
1880	200	—
1890	565	+182.5%
1900	1,021	+80.7%
1910	1,191	+16.7%
1920	1,783	+49.7%
1930	2,061	+15.6%
1940	2,074	+0.6%
1950	1,829	−11.8%
1960	2,286	+25.0%
1970	2,448	+7.1%
1980	2,281	−6.8%
1990	2,395	+5.0%
2000	2,264	−5.5%
2010	2,543	+12.3%
2020	2,802	+10.2%
Iowa Data Center; Source: U.S. Decennial Census

=== 2020 census ===
As of the 2020 census, there were 2,802 people, 1,160 households, and 736 families residing in the city. The population density was 2,288.6 inhabitants per square mile (883.6/km^{2}). There were 1,227 housing units at an average density of 1,002.2 per square mile (386.9/km^{2}).

Of the 1,160 households, 31.7% had children under the age of 18 living with them, 47.8% were married-couple households, 9.5% were cohabitating couples, 25.7% had a female householder with no spouse or partner present, and 17.0% had a male householder with no spouse or partner present. About 36.6% of all households were non-families, 29.7% of all households were made up of individuals, and 13.9% had someone living alone who was 65 years of age or older.

The median age in the city was 39.0 years. 24.7% of residents were under the age of 18. 26.3% of residents were under the age of 20; 5.2% were between the ages of 20 and 24; 26.9% were from 25 to 44; 22.2% were from 45 to 64; and 19.3% were 65 years of age or older. The gender makeup of the city was 49.2% male and 50.8% female. For every 100 females there were 96.9 males, and for every 100 females age 18 and over there were 91.1 males age 18 and over.

0.0% of residents lived in urban areas, while 100.0% lived in rural areas.

There were 1,227 housing units, of which 5.5% were vacant. The homeowner vacancy rate was 1.6% and the rental vacancy rate was 5.3%.

Racial composition as of the 2020 census
Race	Number	Percent
White	2,648	94.5%
Black or African American	17	0.6%
American Indian and Alaska Native	1	0.0%
Asian	8	0.3%
Native Hawaiian and Other Pacific Islander	0	0.0%
Some other race	20	0.7%
Two or more races	108	3.9%
Hispanic or Latino (of any race)	70	2.5%

=== 2010 census ===
As of the census of 2010, there were 2,543 people, 1,045 households, and 682 families residing in the city. The population density was 2,137.0 inhabitants per square mile (825.1/km^{2}). There were 1,138 housing units at an average density of 956.3 per square mile (369.2/km^{2}). The racial makeup of the city was 98.6% White, 0.2% African American, 0.1% Native American, 0.1% Asian, 0.2% from other races, and 0.8% from two or more races. Hispanic or Latino of any race were 0.8% of the population.

There were 1,045 households, of which 32.5% had children under the age of 18 living with them, 51.6% were married couples living together, 10.3% had a female householder with no husband present, 3.3% had a male householder with no wife present, and 34.7% were non-families. 29.8% of all households were made up of individuals, and 13.4% had someone living alone who was 65 years of age or older. The average household size was 2.33 and the average family size was 2.88.

The median age in the city was 40.2 years. 24.7% of residents were under the age of 18; 5.8% were between the ages of 18 and 24; 25.5% were from 25 to 44; 24.3% were from 45 to 64; and 19.8% were 65 years of age or older. The gender makeup of the city was 47.1% male and 52.9% female.

=== 2000 census ===
As of the census of 2000, there were 2,264 people, 914 households, and 637 families residing in the city. The population density was 1,968.4 inhabitants per square mile (760.0/km^{2}). There were 975 housing units at an average density of 847.7 per square mile (327.3/km^{2}). The racial makeup of the city was 99.20% White, 0.09% Native American, 0.22% Asian, 0.13% from other races, and 0.35% from two or more races. Hispanic or Latino of any race were 1.19% of the population.

There were 914 households, out of which 33.2% had children under the age of 18 living with them, 58.5% were married couples living together, 8.1% had a female householder with no husband present, and 30.3% were non-families. 26.5% of all households were made up of individuals, and 13.3% had someone living alone who was 65 years of age or older. The average household size was 2.48 and the average family size was 3.00.

26.2% are under the age of 18, 9.2% from 18 to 24, 28.6% from 25 to 44, 20.5% from 45 to 64, and 15.4% who were 65 years of age or older. The median age was 36 years. For every 100 females, there were 98.1 males. For every 100 females age 18 and over, there were 92.8 males.

The median income for a household in the city was $39,706, and the median income for a family was $47,596. Males had a median income of $33,889 versus $26,173 for females. The per capita income for the city was $24,576. About 5.6% of families and 7.8% of the population were below the poverty line, including 12.2% of those under age 18 and 5.6% of those age 65 or over.

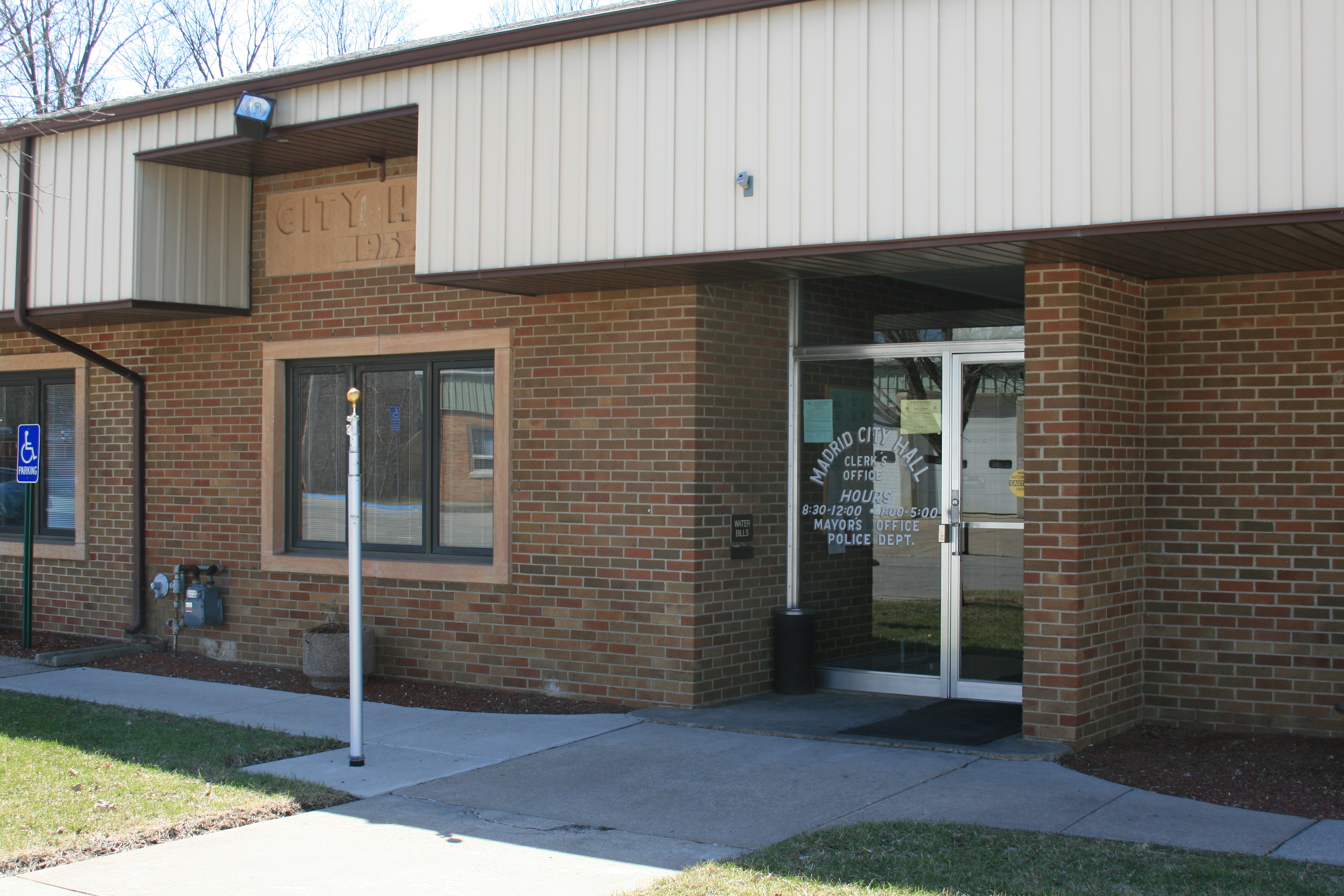
Madrid City Hall

== Points of interest ==
- Hindu Temple & Cultural Center of Iowa
- Snus Hill Winery
- Iowa Arboretum
- Swede Point Park
- Madrid Historical Museum
- High Trestle Trail
- Madrid High School
