= Barnes Township, Buena Vista County, Iowa =

Township in Iowa, US

Barnes Township, Buena Vista County
- Township
- Coordinates: 42°51′31″N 095°12′54″W
- Country: United States
- State: Iowa
- County: Buena Vista

Area
  - Total: 36.32 sq mi (94.06 km^{2})
  - Land: 36 sq mi (94 km^{2})
  - Water: 0.023 sq mi (0.06 km^{2})
- Elevation: 1,348 ft (411 m)

Population (2000)
  - Total: 695
  - Density: 19/sq mi (7.4/km^{2})
- FIPS code: 19-90129
- GNIS feature ID: 0467415

Barnes Township is one of eighteen townships in Buena Vista County, Iowa, United States. As of the 2000 census, its population was 695.

== Geography ==
Barnes Township covers an area of 36.32 square miles (94.1 km^{2}) and contains two incorporated settlements: Linn Grove and Rembrandt. According to the USGS, it contains two cemeteries: Barnes Township and Little Sioux Valley.
