= Albert City, Iowa =

- City
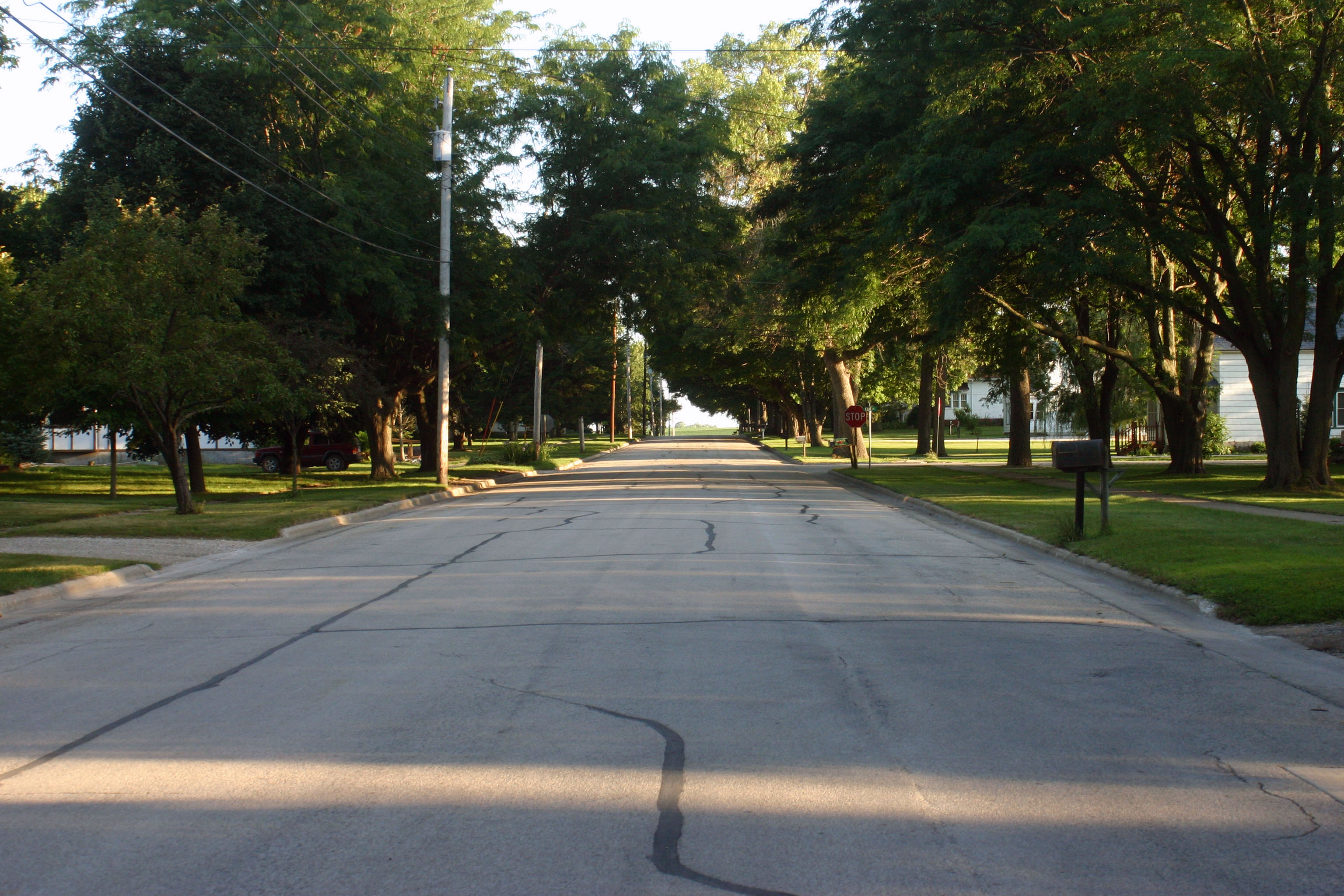
- A tree-lined street in Albert City

- Location of Albert City, Iowa
- Coordinates: 42°46′54″N 94°56′57″W
- Country: United States
- State: Iowa
- County: Buena Vista

Area
  - Total: 0.54 sq mi (1.41 km^{2})
  - Land: 0.54 sq mi (1.41 km^{2})
  - Water: 0 sq mi (0.00 km^{2})
- Elevation: 1,322 ft (403 m)

Population (2020)
  - Total: 677
  - Density: 1,242.8/sq mi (479.85/km^{2})
- Time zone: UTC-6 (Central (CST))
  - Summer (DST): UTC-5 (CDT)
- ZIP code: 50510
- Area code: 712
- FIPS code: 19-00865
- GNIS feature ID: 2393901
- Website: http://www.albertcity.com

Albert City is a city in Buena Vista County, Iowa, United States. The population was 677 at the 2020 census.

The museum in Albert City is located in the former Chicago, Milwaukee and Pacific Railroad-Albert City Station, which is listed on the National Register of Historic Places.

The Albert City Threshermen and Collectors Show has been an annual summer event since 1971.

== History ==
The town was established in 1890 on property owned by George Anderson, and was initially named Manthorp, after a town in Sweden. However, the post office department was concerned that the town's name would be confused with the nearby community of Marathon, so Manthorp was renamed for Albertina Anderson, the founder's wife. Albert City was incorporated in 1900.

== Geography ==
According to the United States Census Bureau, the city has a total area of 0.54 square miles (1.40 km^{2}), all land.

== Demographics ==
Historical populations
Year	Pop.	±%
1910	261	—
1920	567	+117.2%
1930	563	−0.7%
1940	759	+34.8%
1950	736	−3.0%
1960	722	−1.9%
1970	683	−5.4%
1980	818	+19.8%
1990	779	−4.8%
2000	709	−9.0%
2010	699	−1.4%
2020	677	−3.1%
Source:"U.S. Census website". United States Census Bureau. and Iowa Data Center; Source: U.S. Decennial Census

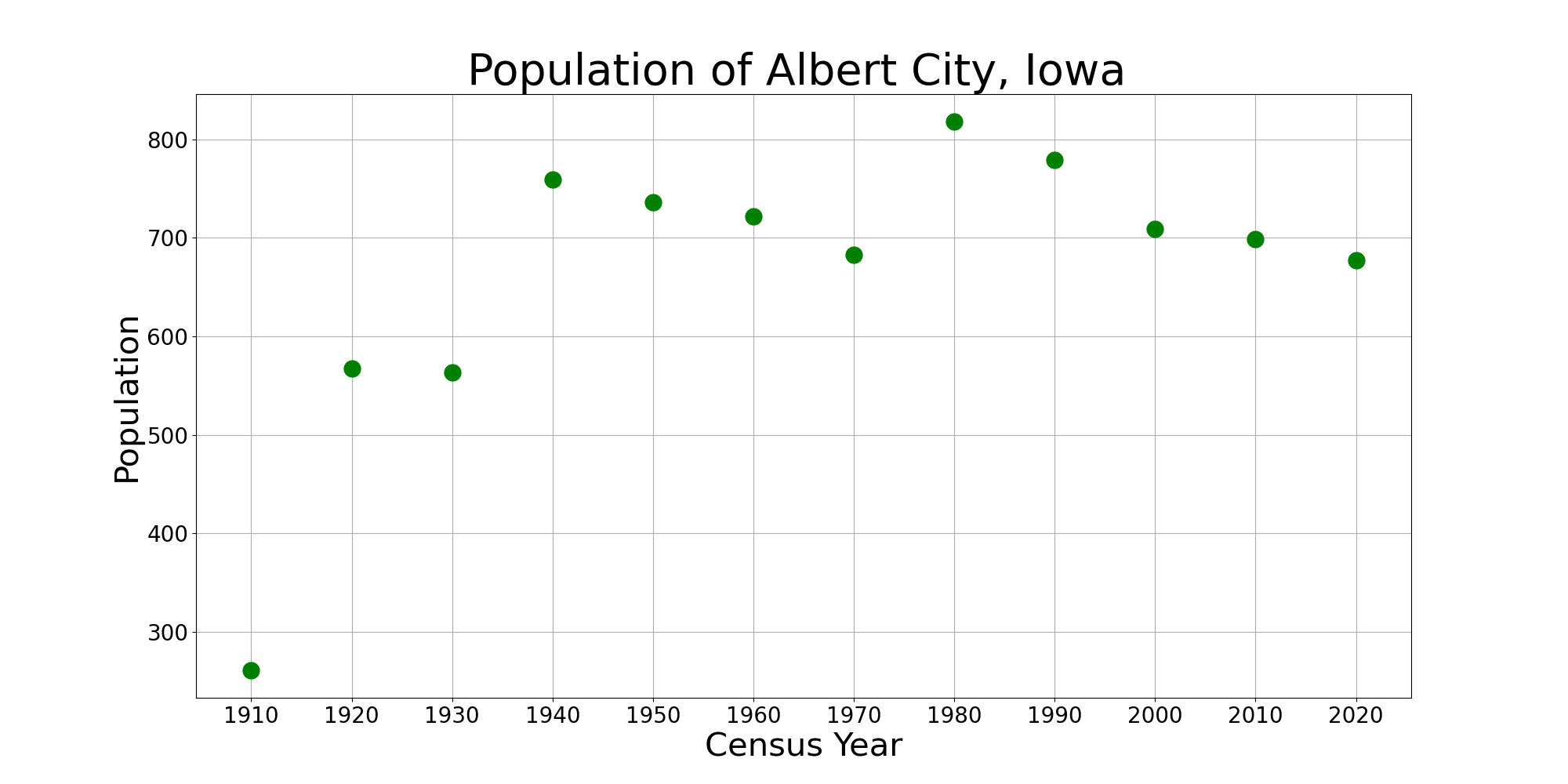
The population of Albert City, Iowa from US census data

=== 2020 census ===
As of the census of 2020, there were 677 people, 276 households, and 176 families residing in the city. The population density was 1,242.8 inhabitants per square mile (479.8/km^{2}). There were 316 housing units at an average density of 580.1 per square mile (224.0/km^{2}). The racial makeup of the city was 88.6% White, 0.0% Black or African American, 0.3% Native American, 0.4% Asian, 0.0% Pacific Islander, 5.0% from other races and 5.6% from two or more races. Hispanic or Latino people of any race comprised 11.4% of the population.

Of the 276 households, 30.1% of which had children under the age of 18 living with them, 47.8% were married couples living together, 5.8% were cohabitating couples, 29.0% had a female householder with no spouse or partner present and 17.4% had a male householder with no spouse or partner present. 36.2% of all households were non-families. 33.7% of all households were made up of individuals, 17.8% had someone living alone who was 65 years old or older.

The median age in the city was 43.1 years. 26.6% of the residents were under the age of 20; 3.5% were between the ages of 20 and 24; 21.4% were from 25 and 44; 22.0% were from 45 and 64; and 26.4% were 65 years of age or older. The gender makeup of the city was 49.0% male and 51.0% female.

=== 2010 census ===
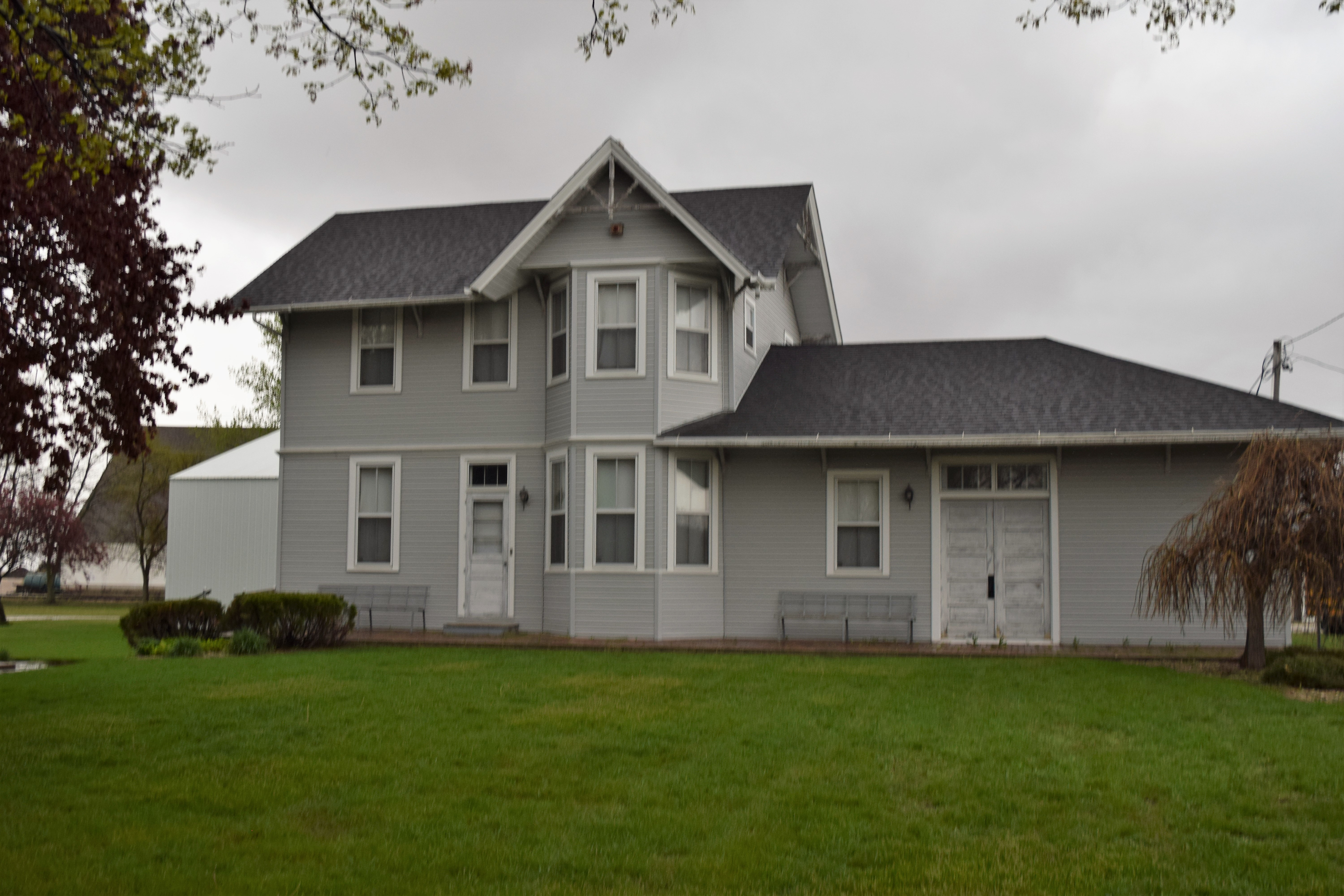
The Chicago, Milwaukee and Pacific Railroad- Albert City Station

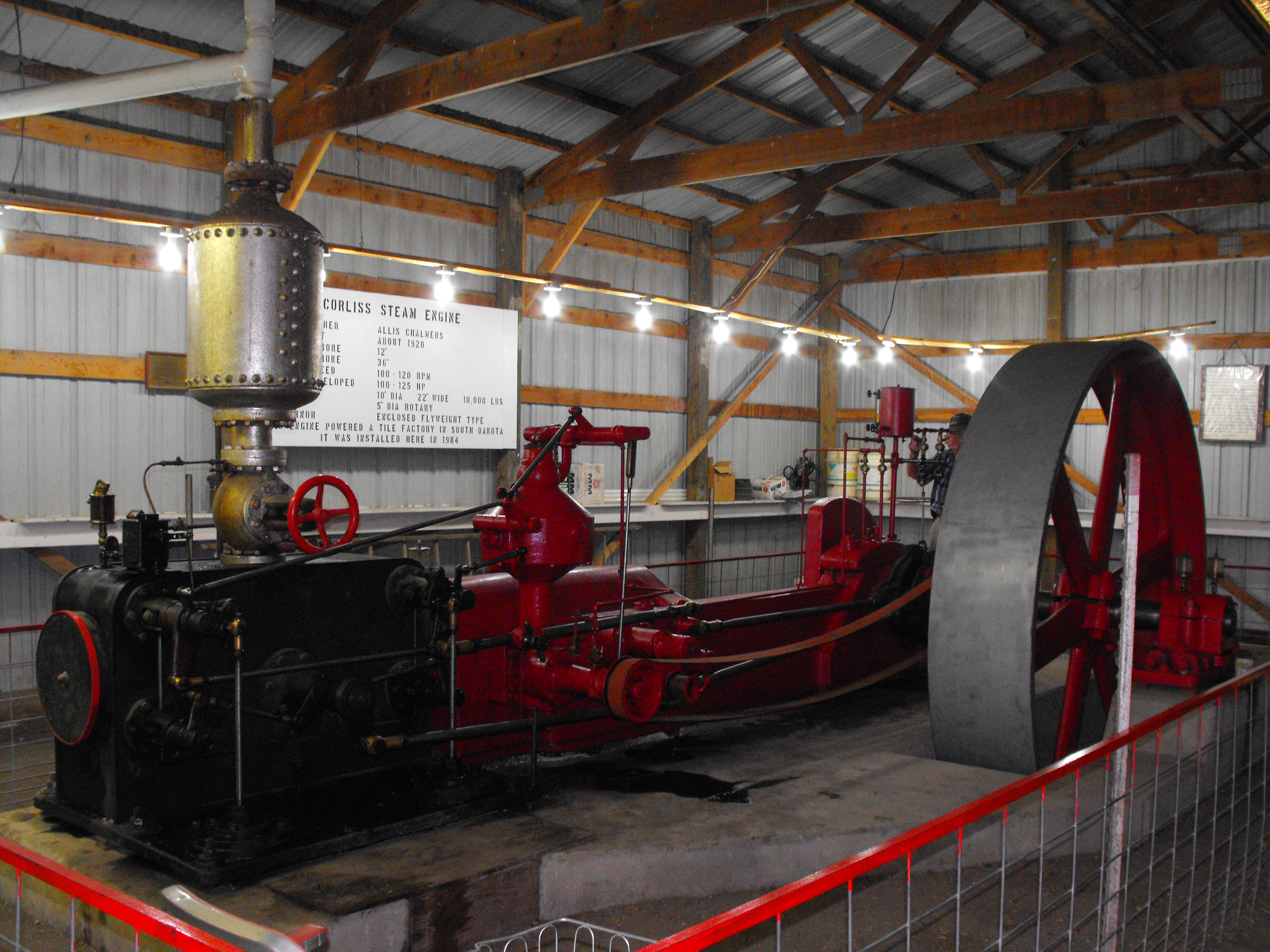
Corliss steam engine display at the Albert City Thresherman and Collectors Show

As of the census of 2010, there were 699 people, 297 households, and 174 families living in the city. The population density was 1,294.4 inhabitants per square mile (499.8/km^{2}). There were 336 housing units at an average density of 622.2 per square mile (240.2/km^{2}). The racial makeup of the city was 98.0% White, 0.1% African American, 0.1% Asian, 1.0% from other races, and 0.7% from two or more races. Hispanic or Latino of any race were 3.0% of the population.

There were 297 households, of which 26.3% had children under the age of 18 living with them, 48.1% were married couples living together, 6.7% had a female householder with no husband present, 3.7% had a male householder with no wife present, and 41.4% were non-families. 37.4% of all households were made up of individuals, and 18.2% had someone living alone who was 65 years of age or older. The average household size was 2.21 and the average family size was 2.94.

The median age in the city was 46.1 years. 23.9% of residents were under the age of 18; 5% were between the ages of 18 and 24; 20.2% were from 25 to 44; 26.5% were from 45 to 64; and 24.5% were 65 years of age or older. The gender makeup of the city was 48.2% male and 51.8% female.

=== 2000 census ===
As of the census of 2000, there were 709 people, 284 households, and 191 families living in the city. The population density was 1,302.9 inhabitants per square mile (503.1/km^{2}). There were 312 housing units at an average density of 573.4 per square mile (221.4/km^{2}). The racial makeup of the city was 98.73% White, 0.56% Native American, 0.14% Asian, 0.14% from other races, and 0.42% from two or more races. Hispanic or Latino of any race were 0.56% of the population.

There were 284 households, out of which 31.0% had children under the age of 18 living with them, 59.9% were married couples living together, 5.3% had a female householder with no husband present, and 32.7% were non-families. 30.3% of all households were made up of individuals, and 17.3% had someone living alone who was 65 years of age or older. The average household size was 2.38 and the average family size was 2.98.

25.2% are under the age of 18, 6.9% from 18 to 24, 23.4% from 25 to 44, 21.9% from 45 to 64, and 22.6% who were 65 years of age or older. The median age was 41 years. For every 100 females, there were 88.6 males. For every 100 females age 18 and over, there were 83.4 males.

The median income for a household in the city was $33,188, and the median income for a family was $36,167. Males had a median income of $30,987 versus $22,125 for females. The per capita income for the city was $15,219. About 7.9% of families and 9.5% of the population were below the poverty line, including 14.4% of those under age 18 and 10.3% of those age 65 or over.

== Arts and culture ==
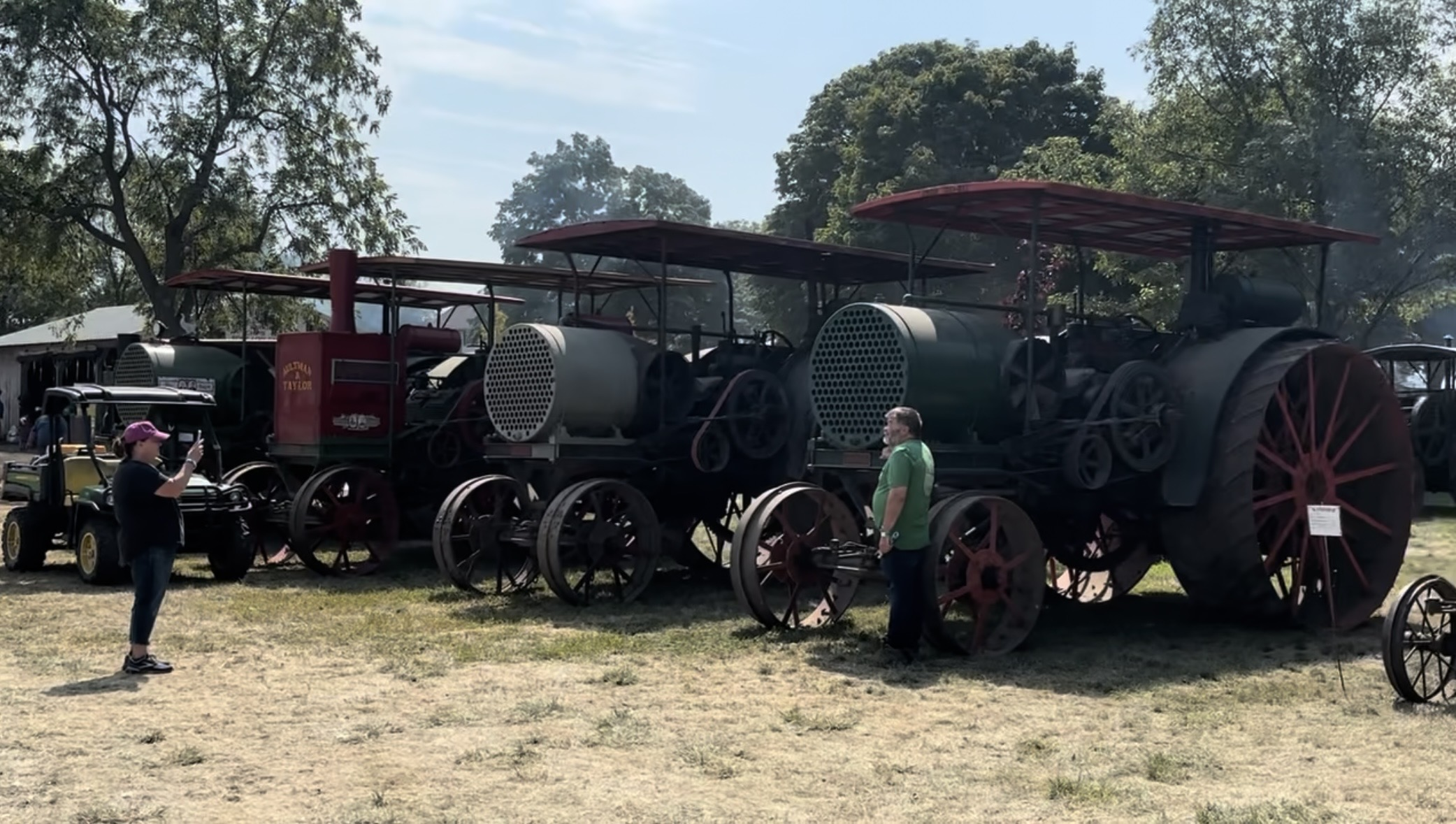
Multiple steam engines on display at the Albert City Thresherman and Collectors Show

The annual Albert City Thresherman and Collectors Show, founded in 1971, features antique tractors and other farm equipment, field demonstrations, a military museum, classic car display, steam engines, food vendors, and petting zoo. In 2016, the show set the world record for the most draft horses plowing simultaneously, at 120 horses and 27 mules.

The annual Albert City "Meat Days" Summerfest is a community celebration that featurese a 5k run, parade, community meal, and concert.

== Education ==
Albert City is served by the Albert City–Truesdale Community School District for preschool through 6th grade, and by Sioux Central Community Schools for middle and high school.
