= Hayes Township, Buena Vista County, Iowa =

Township in Iowa, US

Hayes Township, Buena Vista County
- Township
- Coordinates: 42°35′50″N 095°13′12″W
- Country: United States
- State: Iowa
- County: Buena Vista

Area
  - Total: 33.37 sq mi (86.43 km^{2})
  - Land: 28.54 sq mi (73.93 km^{2})
  - Water: 4.8 sq mi (12.5 km^{2})
- Elevation: 1,460 ft (445 m)

Population (2000)
  - Total: 1,144
  - Density: 40/sq mi (15.5/km^{2})
- FIPS code: 19-91887
- GNIS feature ID: 0468020

Hayes Township is one of eighteen townships in Buena Vista County, Iowa, United States. As of the 2000 census, its population was 1,144.

== Geography ==
Hayes Township covers an area of 33.37 square miles (86.4 km^{2}) and contains one incorporated settlement, Lakeside. According to the USGS, it contains two cemeteries: Hayes Township and Saint Marys.
