= Fairfield Township, Buena Vista County, Iowa =

Township in Iowa, US

Fairfield Township, Buena Vista County
- Township
- Coordinates: 42°46′44″N 094°58′20″W
- Country: United States
- State: Iowa
- County: Buena Vista

Area
  - Total: 36.66 sq mi (94.95 km^{2})
  - Land: 36.66 sq mi (94.95 km^{2})
  - Water: 0 sq mi (0 km^{2})
- Elevation: 1,302 ft (397 m)

Population (2000)
  - Total: 951
  - Density: 26/sq mi (10/km^{2})
- FIPS code: 19-91272
- GNIS feature ID: 0467808

Fairfield Township is one of eighteen townships in Buena Vista County, Iowa, USA. As of the 2000 census, its population was 951.

== Geography ==
Fairfield Township covers an area of 36.66 square miles (94.9 km^{2}) and contains one incorporated settlement, Albert City. According to the USGS, it contains two cemeteries: Fairfield and Smith.
