= Nokomis Township =

Nokomis Township may refer to the following townships in the United States:

- Nokomis Township, Montgomery County, Illinois
- Nokomis Township, Buena Vista County, Iowa
