= Poland Township =

Poland Township may refer to the following townships in the United States:

- Poland Township, Buena Vista County, Iowa
- Poland Township, Mahoning County, Ohio
