= Washington Township, Buena Vista County, Iowa =

Township in Iowa, US

Washington Township, Buena Vista County
- Township
- Coordinates: 42°41′54″N 095°12′20″W
- Country: United States
- State: Iowa
- County: Buena Vista

Area
  - Total: 34.81 sq mi (90.17 km^{2})
  - Land: 34.80 sq mi (90.12 km^{2})
  - Water: 0.019 sq mi (0.05 km^{2})
- Elevation: 1,401 ft (427 m)

Population (2000)
  - Total: 663
  - Density: 19/sq mi (7.4/km^{2})
- FIPS code: 19-94461
- GNIS feature ID: 0468905

Washington Township is one of sixteen townships in Buena Vista County, Iowa, United States. As of the 2000 census, its population was 663.

== Geography ==
Washington Township covers an area of 34.81 square miles (90.2 km^{2}) and contains one incorporated settlement, Truesdale. According to the USGS, it contains one cemetery, Buena Vista Memorial Park.
