= Linn Grove, Iowa =

- City
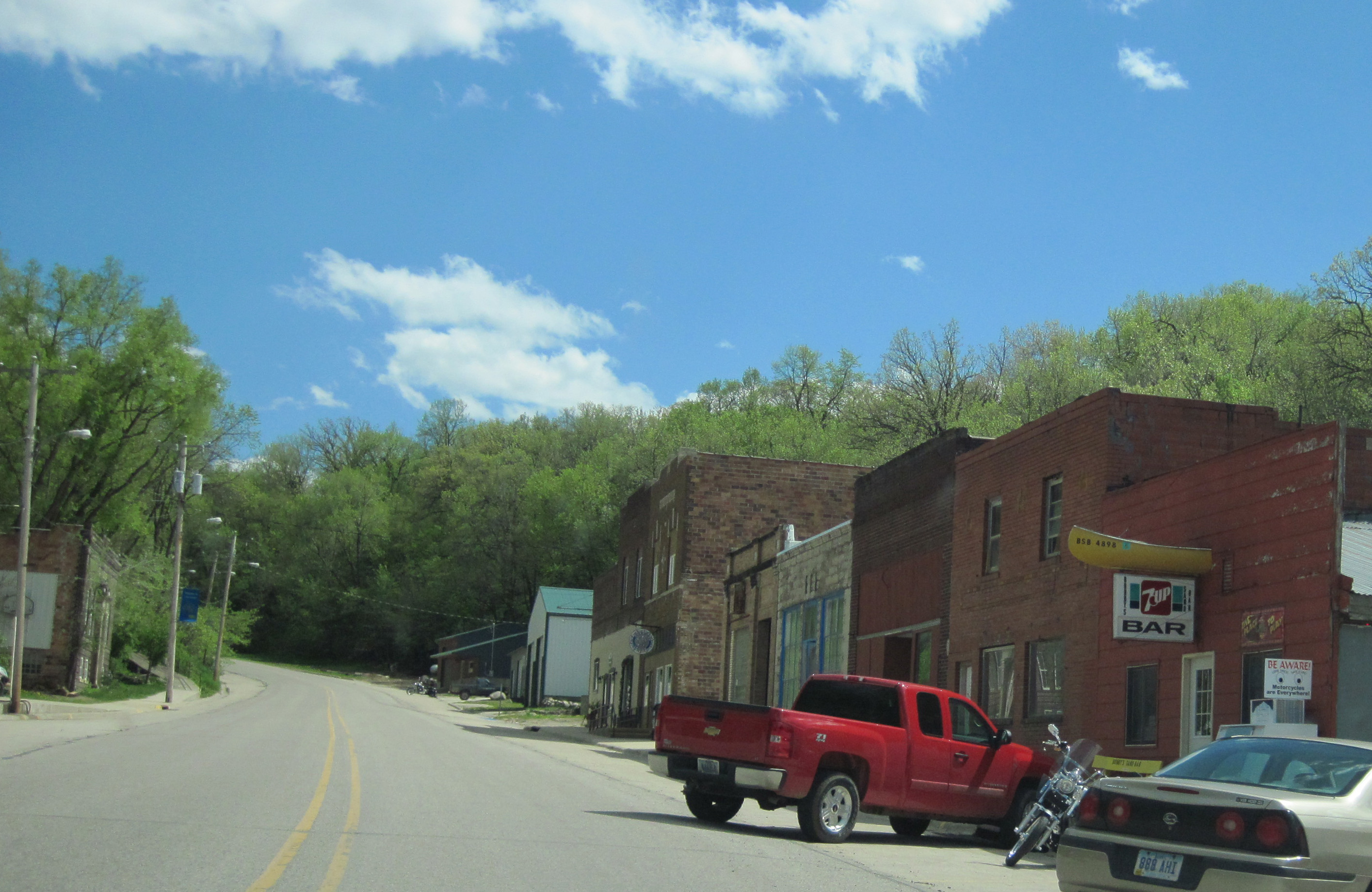
- Street scene in Linn Grove

- Location of Linn Grove, Iowa
- Coordinates: 42°53′34″N 95°14′32″W
- Country: US
- State: Iowa
- County: Buena Vista

Area
  - Total: 0.58 sq mi (1.51 km^{2})
  - Land: 0.56 sq mi (1.45 km^{2})
  - Water: 0.027 sq mi (0.07 km^{2})
- Elevation: 1,247 ft (380 m)

Population (2020)
  - Total: 163
  - Density: 292.0/sq mi (112.74/km^{2})
- Time zone: UTC-6 (Central (CST))
  - Summer (DST): UTC-5 (CDT)
- ZIP code: 51033
- Area code: 712
- FIPS code: 19-45480
- GNIS feature ID: 2395722
- Website: www.linngroveiowa.org

Linn Grove is a city in Buena Vista County, Iowa, United States. The population was 163 at the time of the 2020 census. The nearby Chan-Ya-Ta Site contains the remains of a 1000-year-old prehistoric village, and is on the National Register of Historic Places.

== History ==
A post office called Linn Grove has been in operation since 1877. Linn Grove was named for a grove of linden trees near the town site.

== Geography ==
Linn Grove is situated near the Little Sioux River.

According to the United States Census Bureau, the city has a total area of 0.61 square miles (1.58 km^{2}), of which 0.58 square miles (1.50 km^{2}) is land and 0.03 square miles (0.08 km^{2}) is water.

== Demographics ==
Historical populations
| Year | Pop. | ±% |
|---|---|---|
| 1920 | 433 | — |
| 1930 | 360 | −16.9% |
| 1940 | 402 | +11.7% |
| 1950 | 320 | −20.4% |
| 1960 | 330 | +3.1% |
| 1970 | 240 | −27.3% |
| 1980 | 205 | −14.6% |
| 1990 | 194 | −5.4% |
| 2000 | 211 | +8.8% |
| 2010 | 154 | −27.0% |
| 2020 | 163 | +5.8% |
Source:"U.S. Census website". United States Census Bureau. and Iowa Data Center; Source: U.S. Decennial Census

=== 2020 census ===
As of the census of 2020, there were 163 people, 82 households, and 48 families residing in the city. The population density was 292.0 inhabitants per square mile (112.7/km^{2}). There were 92 housing units at an average density of 164.8 per square mile (63.6/km^{2}). The racial makeup of the city was 81.0% White, 0.6% Black or African American, 0.0% Native American, 0.0% Asian, 0.6% Pacific Islander, 5.5% from other races and 12.3% from two or more races. Hispanic or Latino persons of any race comprised 16.6% of the population.

Of the 82 households, 20.7% of which had children under the age of 18 living with them, 39.0% were married couples living together, 9.8% were cohabitating couples, 30.5% had a female householder with no spouse or partner present and 20.7% had a male householder with no spouse or partner present. 41.5% of all households were non-families. 36.6% of all households were made up of individuals, 18.3% had someone living alone who was 65 years old or older.

The median age in the city was 52.8 years. 20.2% of the residents were under the age of 20; 1.8% were between the ages of 20 and 24; 18.4% were from 25 and 44; 29.4% were from 45 and 64; and 30.1% were 65 years of age or older. The gender makeup of the city was 47.9% male and 52.1% female.

=== 2010 census ===
As of the census of 2010, there were 154 people, 81 households, and 42 families residing in the city. The population density was 265.5 inhabitants per square mile (102.5/km^{2}). There were 93 housing units at an average density of 160.3 per square mile (61.9/km^{2}). The racial makeup of the city was 96.8% White, 0.6% African American, and 2.6% from other races. Hispanic or Latino of any race were 8.4% of the population.

There were 81 households, of which 17.3% had children under the age of 18 living with them, 44.4% were married couples living together, 2.5% had a female householder with no husband present, 4.9% had a male householder with no wife present, and 48.1% were non-families. 45.7% of all households were made up of individuals, and 16% had someone living alone who was 65 years of age or older. The average household size was 1.90 and the average family size was 2.67.

The median age in the city was 51.7 years. 16.9% of residents were under the age of 18; 4.5% were between the ages of 18 and 24; 12.9% were from 25 to 44; 48.6% were from 45 to 64; and 16.9% were 65 years of age or older. The gender makeup of the city was 48.1% male and 51.9% female.

=== 2000 census ===
As of the census of 2000, there were 211 people, 89 households, and 56 families residing in the city. The population density was 355.1 inhabitants per square mile (137.1/km^{2}). There were 99 housing units at an average density of 166.6 per square mile (64.3/km^{2}). The racial makeup of the city was 91.47% White, 8.53% from other races. Hispanic or Latino of any race were 8.53% of the population.

There were 89 households, out of which 27.0% had children under the age of 18 living with them, 49.4% were married couples living together, 11.2% had a female householder with no husband present, and 36.0% were non-families. 32.6% of all households were made up of individuals, and 14.6% had someone living alone who was 65 years of age or older. The average household size was 2.37 and the average family size was 3.00.

In the city, the population was spread out, with 24.6% under the age of 18, 7.6% from 18 to 24, 26.1% from 25 to 44, 24.6% from 45 to 64, and 17.1% who were 65 years of age or older. The median age was 42 years. For every 100 females, there were 86.7 males. For every 100 females age 18 and over, there were 89.3 males.

The median income for a household in the city was $33,125, and the median income for a family was $38,438. Males had a median income of $29,500 versus $24,167 for females. The per capita income for the city was $22,945. About 3.1% of families and 5.3% of the population were below the poverty line, including none of those under the age of eighteen and 4.2% of those 65 or over.

== Media ==
The local newspaper that covers events and news near Linn Grove is the Peterson Patriot.

== Education ==
Sioux Central Community School District serves the community.

Previously it was served by the Linn Grove School District. In the early 1960s it consolidated with the Peterson School District to form the Sioux Valley School District. On July 1, 1993 the Sioux Valley district merged with the Sioux Rapids-Rembrandt School District to form the Sioux Central district.

== Notable people ==
- Stell Andersen, classical pianist
- Rick Grapenthin, baseball player.
