= Newell Township, Buena Vista County, Iowa =

Township in Iowa, US

Newell Township, Buena Vista County
- Township
- Coordinates: 42°36′11″N 094°58′34″W
- Country: United States
- State: Iowa
- County: Buena Vista

Area
  - Total: 35.85 sq mi (92.86 km^{2})
  - Land: 35.82 sq mi (92.77 km^{2})
  - Water: 0.035 sq mi (0.09 km^{2})
- Elevation: 1,260 ft (384 m)

Population (2000)
  - Total: 1,183
  - Density: 33/sq mi (12.8/km^{2})
- FIPS code: 19-93078
- GNIS feature ID: 0468431

Newell Township is one of sixteen townships in Buena Vista County, Iowa, United States. As of the 2000 census, its population was 1,183.

== Geography ==
Newell Township covers an area of 35.85 square miles (92.9 km^{2}) and contains one incorporated settlement, Newell. According to the USGS, it contains four cemeteries: Cooke, First M E Church, Newell Catholic and Newell.
