= Albert City–Truesdale Community School District =

School district in Iowa

Coordinates: 42.782813°N 94.949833°W

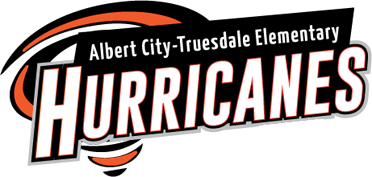

Location
- Albert City, Iowa Buena Vista and Pocahontas counties United States
- Coordinates: 42.782813, -94.949833

District information
- Type: Local school district
- Grades: K–6
- Schools: Albert City–Truesdale Elementary School
- Budget: $3,833,000 (2020-21)
- NCES District ID: 1900031

Students and staff
- Students: 114 (2022-23)
- Teachers: 10.66 FTE
- Staff: 15.69 FTE
- Student–teacher ratio: 10.69

Other information
- Website: www.albertct.k12.ia.us

Albert City–Truesdale Community School District (AC-T) is a rural public school district that operates a single elementary school, Albert City–Truesdale Elementary School, in Albert City, Iowa. The district, which also serves Truesdale, is mostly in Buena Vista County, but also is located in sections of Pocahontas County.

Albert City–Truesdale sends its high school students to the Sioux Central Community School District. The district decided to begin sending its junior and senior high school students elsewhere in 2004, causing the Albert City–Truesdale Secondary School to end operations. AC-T signed a ten-year grade sharing agreement with Sioux Central in 2006.
