= Grant Township, Buena Vista County, Iowa =

Township in Iowa, US

Grant Township, Buena Vista County
- Township
- Coordinates: 42°41′50″N 095°05′15″W
- Country: United States
- State: Iowa
- County: Buena Vista

Area
  - Total: 36.12 sq mi (93.56 km^{2})
  - Land: 36.12 sq mi (93.56 km^{2})
  - Water: 0 sq mi (0 km^{2})
- Elevation: 1,283 ft (391 m)

Population (2000)
  - Total: 297
  - Density: 8.3/sq mi (3.2/km^{2})
- FIPS code: 19-91632
- GNIS feature ID: 0467931

Grant Township is one of eighteen townships in Buena Vista County, Iowa, USA. As of the 2000 census, its population was 297.

== Geography ==
Grant Township covers an area of 36.12 square miles (93.6 km^{2}) and contains no incorporated settlements. According to the USGS, it contains two cemeteries: Saint Johns Church of Christ and Zion Lutheran.
