= Brooke Township, Buena Vista County, Iowa =

Township in Iowa, US

Brooke Township, Buena Vista County
- Township
- Coordinates: 42°51′49″N 095°20′15″W
- Country: United States
- State: Iowa
- County: Buena Vista

Area
  - Total: 36.52 sq mi (94.58 km^{2})
  - Land: 36.5 sq mi (94.5 km^{2})
  - Water: 0.031 sq mi (0.08 km^{2})
- Elevation: 1,437 ft (438 m)

Population (2000)
  - Total: 174
  - Density: 4.7/sq mi (1.8/km^{2})
- FIPS code: 19-90351
- GNIS feature ID: 0467490

Brooke Township is one of sixteen townships in Buena Vista County, Iowa, United States. As of the 2000 census, its population was 174.

== Geography ==
Brooke Township covers an area of 36.52 square miles (94.6 km^{2}) and contains no incorporated settlements. According to the USGS, it contains two cemeteries: Daily Burial Ground and Saint John's.
