= Scott Township, Buena Vista County, Iowa =

Township in Iowa, US

Scott Township, Buena Vista County
- Township
- Coordinates: 42°46′21″N 095°13′12″W
- Country: United States
- State: Iowa
- County: Buena Vista

Area
  - Total: 36.48 sq mi (94.48 km^{2})
  - Land: 36.47 sq mi (94.45 km^{2})
  - Water: 0.012 sq mi (0.03 km^{2})
- Elevation: 1,348 ft (411 m)

Population (2000)
  - Total: 245
  - Density: 6.7/sq mi (2.6/km^{2})
- FIPS code: 19-93768
- GNIS feature ID: 0468665

Scott Township is one of sixteen townships in Buena Vista County, Iowa, USA. As of the 2000 census, its population was 245.

== Geography ==
Scott Township covers an area of 36.48 square miles (94.5 km^{2}) and contains no incorporated settlements.
