= Elk Township, Buena Vista County, Iowa =

Township in Iowa, US

Elk Township, Buena Vista County
- Township
- Coordinates: 42°46′40″N 095°19′44″W
- Country: United States
- State: Iowa
- County: Buena Vista

Area
  - Total: 36.26 sq mi (93.91 km^{2})
  - Land: 36.3 sq mi (93.9 km^{2})
  - Water: 0.0039 sq mi (0.01 km^{2})
- Elevation: 1,430 ft (436 m)

Population (2000)
  - Total: 223
  - Density: 6.2/sq mi (2.4/km^{2})
- FIPS code: 19-91173
- GNIS feature ID: 0467775

Elk Township is one of eighteen townships in Buena Vista County, Iowa, USA. As of the 2000 census, its population was 223.

== Geography ==
Elk Township covers an area of 36.26 square miles (93.9 km^{2}) and contains no incorporated settlements. According to the USGS, it contains two cemeteries: Elk and Plainview.
