= Rick Grapenthin =

American baseball player (born 1958)

- Pitcher
- Born: April 16, 1958 (age 66); Linn Grove, Iowa, U.S.
- Batted: Right Threw: Right

MLB debut
- May 3, 1983, for the Montreal Expos

Last MLB appearance
- June 29, 1985, for the Montreal Expos

MLB statistics
- Win–loss record: 1–3
- Earned run average: 6.35
- Innings pitched: 34
- Stats at Baseball Reference

Teams
- Montreal Expos (1983–1985)

Richard Ray Grapenthin (born April 16, 1958) is an American former professional baseball player, a right-handed pitcher who appeared in 19 Major League games, 18 in relief, for the Montreal Expos for parts of three seasons between 1983 and 1985.

The 6 ft 2 in (1.88 m), 185 lb (84 kg) Grapenthin played collegiately at Indiana State University and was signed as an undrafted free agent by Montreal on July 9, 1980. He progressed through the Montreal system — posting a microscopic 0.80 earned run average in 45 innings pitched for the Class A San Jose Expos of the California League in 1982. He made his MLB debut on May 3, 1983. Starting pitcher Scott Sanderson retired the Atlanta Braves in order in the top of the first inning, but on the third out, he was spiked in the pitching hand by Claudell Washington and was forced to leave the game. Grapenthin relieved Sanderson in the second, and kept Atlanta off the scoreboard for his first two innings; but in his third frame, he allowed a three-run home run to Bob Horner and a solo shot to Chris Chambliss, and was tagged with the eventual 5–2 loss. It was his only MLB appearance of 1983; he was sent back to the Triple-A Wichita Aeros and played out the season there.

The 1984 campaign saw Grapenthin spend the early months at Triple-A with the Indianapolis Indians, but he was recalled by the Expos in August, and on August 5, 1984, he made his second MLB appearance, and only starting assignment, at Wrigley Field against the Chicago Cubs. In the third inning, he surrendered a grand slam home run to Keith Moreland, the key blow in a 4–3 Montreal defeat. However, Grapenthin went unscored upon in his next four relief appearances, and was largely effective coming out of Montreal's bullpen for the rest of the season. He earned saves on August 22 and September 5, and his only MLB victory on September 10. The win came when he relieved a beleaguered David Palmer in the first inning against the Pittsburgh Pirates with only one out and four runs in and the bases loaded. Grapenthin retired the next two hitters, then pitched scoreless 4 2/3 innings of scoreless, one-hit ball, while Montreal rallied at bat. He left the game with the Expos in the lead 8–4 and received credit for the victory.

Grapenthin pitched in five games for the 1985 Expos and was sent back to Indianapolis, ending his MLB career. All told, he allowed 36 hits and 16 bases on balls in his 34 MLB innings pitched, with 16 strikeouts and two saves. He later played at Triple-A for the San Diego Padres, St. Louis Cardinals, Detroit Tigers and New York Yankees organizations, and concluded his minor league career in 1989 after ten professional seasons.
