= Fleta Jan Brown Spencer =

American songwriter and singer (1882–1938)

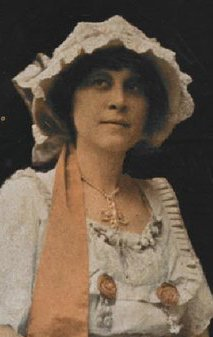
- Fleta Jan Brown Spencer, from the cover of 1915 sheet music for her song, "Dandelion"
- Born: Fleta Jan Brown; March 8, 1882; Iowa
- Died: September 2, 1938 (aged 56); Hackensack, New Jersey
- Occupations: songwriter, composer

Fleta Jan Brown Spencer (March 8, 1882 – September 2, 1938) was an American songwriter, composer, pianist, and singer.

== Early life ==
Fleta Jan Brown was born near Sioux Rapids, Iowa, the daughter of William Edward Brown and Jennie Etta Watkins Brown. Her father was a barber. She trained as a pianist and composer at the Cincinnati Conservatory of Music.

== Career ==
Brown moved to St. Louis, Missouri, after her studies in Cincinnati, and published her first three songs in 1905. After she married fellow songwriter Herbert Spencer, the pair moved to New York, and there were prolific songwriters, sharing credit on dozens of songs published by M. Witmark & Sons, and by Jerome H. Remick. They also performed together at times, both as singers and pianists, in concerts and on the vaudeville stage.

Songs with music, lyrics, or both by Brown included "Tangle Foot Rag" (1907), "Fancies" (1908), "I Wish I was in Heaven Sittin' Down" (1908), "The Party That Wrote 'Home Sweet Home' Never Was a Married Man" (1908, later covered by Jerry Garcia), "O Wondrous Night in June" (1909), "I Know a Blossom" (1909), "In the Dusk" (1909), "The Birth of Love" (1909), "Tickle Toes" (1910), "Back to the Old Folks At Home" (1913), "Kiss Me Again (I Like it)" (1914), "In the Candle-Light" (1914), "When All The World's at Peace" (1914), "Dandelion" (1915), "Underneath the Stars" (1916), "Somewhere my Love Lies Dreaming" (1916), "Now that the Fighting is Over" (1918), "Kiss Me With Your Eyes" (1923), "Rose of Old Castille" (1924) "I Know a Blossom" (1936), "In a Gipsy Camp" (1936), "Vagabond's Bridal March" (1936), and "The Vagabond's Dream" (1936).

== Personal life ==
Fleta Jan Brown married fellow composer and songwriter Herbert D. Spencer in 1907. She died in 1938, aged 56 years, at a hospital in Hackensack, New Jersey.
