= Ira Noel Gabrielson =

American entomologist (1889–1977)

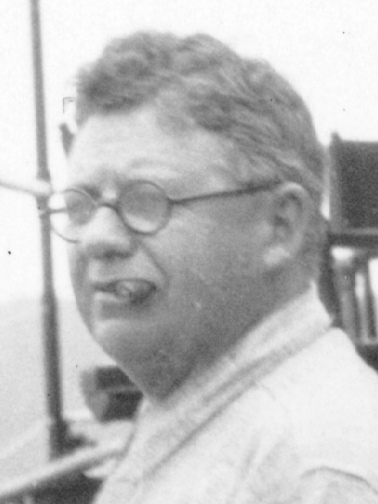
Gabrielson in 1937

Ira Noel Gabrielson (September 27, 1889 – September 7, 1977) was an American naturalist and ornithologist.

== Early life and education ==
Ira Gabrielson was born on September 27, 1889, in Sioux Rapids, Iowa, where he attended and later graduated from Morningside College, in 1912.

== Career ==
He taught biology for a short period of time at Marshalltown High School in Marshalltown, Iowa. After that, he joined the Bureau of Biological Survey.

He became a director of the U.S. Fish and Wildlife Service before which he served as chief of the old Bureau of Biological Survey at the U.S. Department of Agriculture. In 1940, when Biological Survey and the Bureau of Fisheries united into the Fish and Wildlife Service, he became a director, and stayed as such until 1946. During that time, he served as a deputy coordinator of fisheries and a U.S. delegate to the International Whaling Conference and had responsibility for adding millions of acres to the National Wildlife Refuge System. In 1946, he retired from the federal government and became the president of the Wildlife Management Institute.

He served there until 1970, after which he became the chairman of the board. From 1959 to 1976, he was a chairman of NOVA Parks. He was called upon by the governor to the Virginia Outdoor Study Commission, in 1966, during which year he drafted a plan on how to conserve and develop the state's natural resources. In 1975, he and his colleagues were chosen by the American Forestry Association as one of the selected groups for the National Hall of Conservation. He wrote four books and coauthored six others, all of which were on birds and conservation. He joined bird expeditions to the Andes, the Amazon, Europe, the Mediterranean, South Pole, and Alaska.

== Organizational affiliations and awards ==
He was a member of the Audubon Society and was awarded the Audubon Medal in 1949. He also has an award from the Interior Department's Distinguished Service Award. During his lifetime, he also was a member of the American Ornithologists Society, the Ecology Society of America, the Izaak Walton League, Society of Systematic Zoology, Washington Academy of Sciences, and the Cosmos Club.

== Death ==
Gabrielson died of heart complications, on September 7, 1977, while living in Virginia. He was 87 years old.

== Selected publications ==
- Wildlife Conservation (1941)
