= Coon Township, Buena Vista County, Iowa =

Township in Iowa, US

Coon Township, Buena Vista County
- Township
- Coordinates: 42°41′52″N 094°59′02″W
- Country: United States
- State: Iowa
- County: Buena Vista

Area
  - Total: 36.23 sq mi (93.84 km^{2})
  - Land: 36.23 sq mi (93.84 km^{2})
  - Water: 0 sq mi (0 km^{2})
- Elevation: 1,322 ft (403 m)

Population (2000)
  - Total: 237
  - Density: 6.5/sq mi (2.5/km^{2})
- FIPS code: 19-90822
- GNIS feature ID: 0467654

Coon Township is one of eighteen townships in Buena Vista County, Iowa, United States. As of the 2000 census, its population was 237.

== Geography ==
Coon Township covers an area of 36.23 square miles (93.8 km^{2}) and contains no incorporated settlements. According to the USGS, it contains two cemeteries: Saint Johns Lutheran and Varina.
