= Laurens–Marathon Community School District =

Public school district in Laurens, Iowa, United States

Coordinates: 42.852318°N 94.850786°W

Location
- Laurens, Iowa Buena Vista, Clay, Palo Alto, and Pocahontas counties United States
- Coordinates: 42.852318, -94.850786

District information
- Type: Local school district
- Grades: K–8
- Established: 1976
- Superintendent: Kevin Wood
- Schools: 1
- Budget: $4,630,000 (2020-21)
- NCES District ID: 1916420

Students and staff
- Students: 140 (2022-23)
- Teachers: 12.76 FTE
- Staff: 21.43 FTE
- Student–teacher ratio: 10.97
- District mascot: Chargers

Other information
- Website: www.laurens-marathon.k12.ia.us

Laurens–Marathon Community School District is a rural public school district headquartered in Laurens, Iowa, also serving Marathon. The district occupies sections of Buena Vista, Clay, Palo Alto, and Pocahontas counties.

== History ==
It formed on July 1, 1976, by the merger of the Laurens Community School District and the Marathon Community School District.

On July 1, 2010, the South Clay Community School District was dissolved, and Laurens–Marathon received portions of the district.

In 2014, the South Central Calhoun Community School District, a district not contiguous with Laurens–Marathon, entered a superintendent-sharing agreement. The shared superintendent was Jeff Kruse.

The district began partial-day sharing, in which students from one district went to another district for some classes, with the Pocahontas Community School District around 2015.

Kruse was scheduled to leave at the end of the 2016–17 school year. Scott Williamson became the new superintendent in July 2017. That year, the L-M and Pocahontas districts began whole grade-sharing, in which one district sent its children to another district for certain grade levels. L-M had multiple classes it was required to have in order to maintain high school grades, but insufficient numbers of students were enrolled in them. As a result, Laurens–Marathon sent its high school students to Pocahontas high school. Around that time period, Laurens–Marathon elementary school students had, as part of a preliminary indication, increased test scores.

== Schools ==
The district operates two schools in a single facility in Laurens:

- Laurens–Marathon Elementary School
- Laurens–Marathon Middle School

The current 84-foot (26 m) by 50-foot (15 m) gymnasium opened in September 1998. The previous 76-foot (23 m) by 48-foot (15 m) gymnasium, built in the early 1940s, was called "The Barn".

== See also ==
- List of school districts in Iowa
