= Albert City station =

Albert City
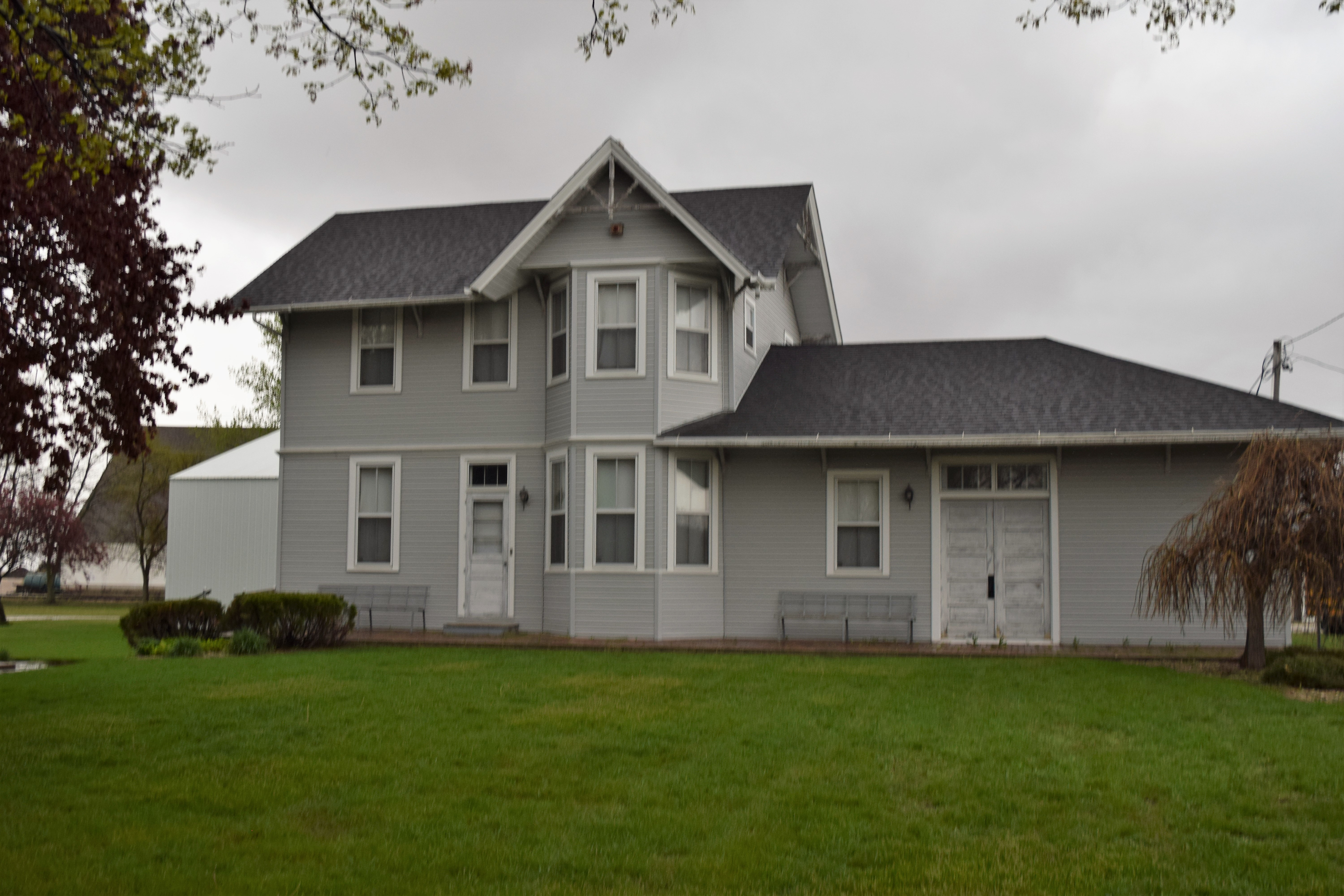

General information
- Location: 212 North 2nd Street, Albert City, Iowa 50150
- System: Former Milwaukee Road passenger rail station

History
- Opened: 1899

Services
Preceding station	Milwaukee Road	Following station
Marathon toward Spirit Lake	Spirit Lake – Des Moines	Varina toward Des Moines
- Chicago, Milwaukee and Pacific Railroad-Albert City Station
- U.S. National Register of Historic Places
- Location within Iowa
- Location: 212 N. 2nd St; Albert City, Iowa
- Coordinates: 42°46′53″N 94°56′54″W
- Built: 1899
- Architectural style: Stick
- NRHP reference No.: 76000737
- Added to NRHP: October 22, 1976
Location

The Chicago, Milwaukee and Pacific Railroad-Albert City Station, also known as the Albert City Depot, was built by the Chicago, Milwaukee, St. Paul and Pacific Railroad (The Milwaukee Road) in 1899 to serve the farms around Albert City, Iowa. The railroad built the line from Des Moines to Spencer, Iowa, in 1899 to serve local agriculture. Albert City was platted the same year. The depot was built for passenger service as well as freight.

The depot is rectangular wood-frame building with a two-story section that held the passenger waiting room and station agent's office on the ground floor and the station agent's apartment on the second floor. Attached to it is a single-story section that held the freight room. A large bay extended from both the agent's office and upper-floor apartment on the track side, allowing the agent a clear view down the tracks.

In 1977, the depot and the surrounding property were sold to a company that wished to build a grain elevator. The town of Albert City and the local historical society purchased the depot and moved it to its present location next to the historical society's museum.

The depot was listed in the National Register of Historic Places due to its association with the development of Albert City.
