= Buena Vista County, Iowa =

County in Iowa, United States

- County
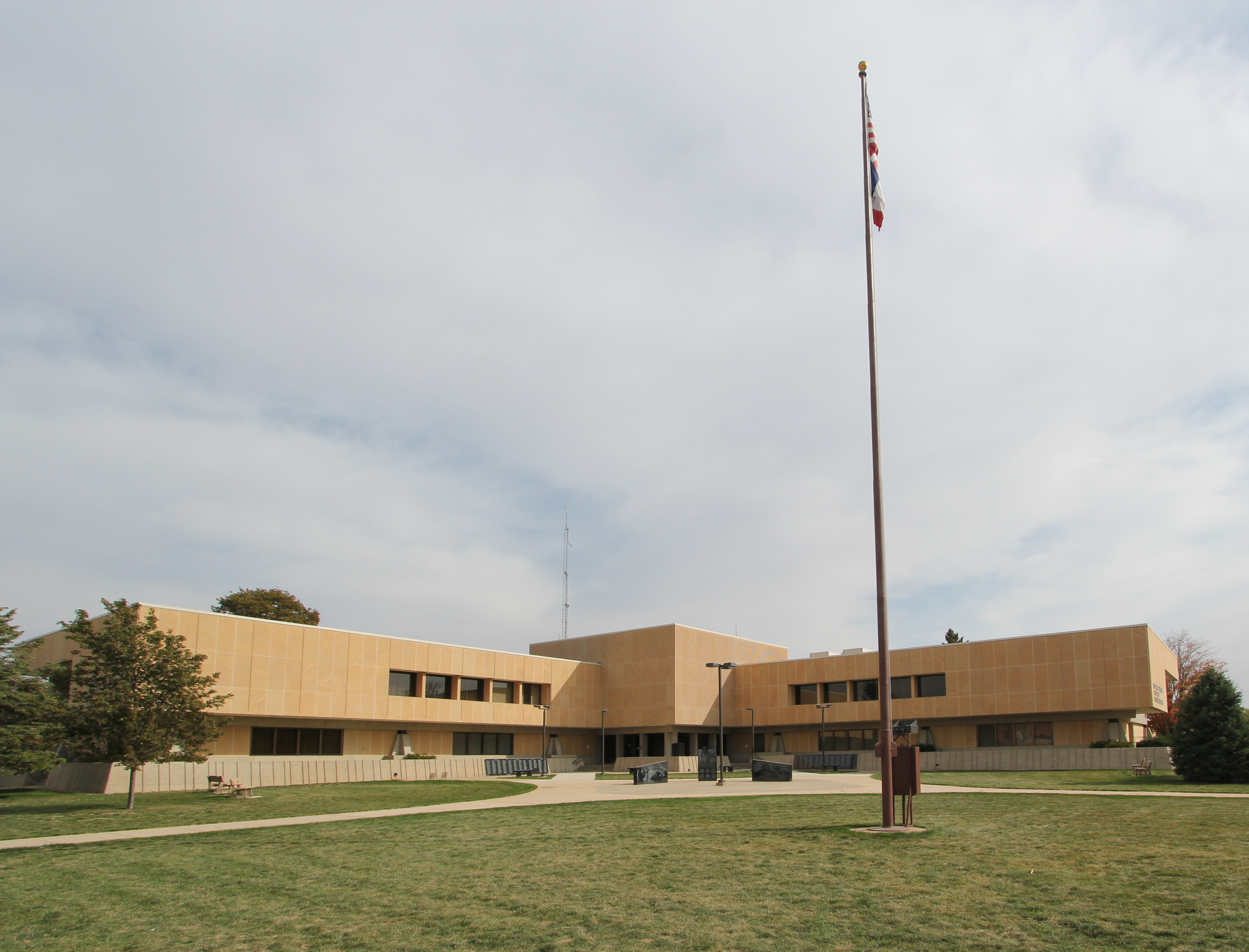
- Buena Vista County Courthouse

- Location within the U.S. state of Iowa
- Coordinates: 42°44′06″N 95°09′01″W
- Country: United States
- State: Iowa
- Founded: 1851
- Named for: Battle of Buena Vista
- Seat: Storm Lake
- Largest city: Storm Lake

Area
  - Total: 580 sq mi (1,500 km^{2})
  - Land: 575 sq mi (1,490 km^{2})
  - Water: 5.3 sq mi (14 km^{2}) 0.9%

Population (2020)
  - Total: 20,823
  - Estimate (2025): 20,449 ▼
  - Density: 36.2/sq mi (14.0/km^{2})
- Time zone: UTC−6 (Central)
  - Summer (DST): UTC−5 (CDT)
- Congressional district: 4th
- Website: buenavistacounty.iowa.gov
- Iowa county number 11

Buena Vista County (/ˌbjuːnə ˈvɪstə/ BEW-nə VIST-ə, Spanish pronunciation: [ˈbwena ˈβista]) is a county located in the U.S. state of Iowa. As of the 2020 census, the population was 20,823. Its county seat is Storm Lake. The county is named for the final victory of Field General Zachary Taylor in the Mexican–American War.

Buena Vista County comprises the Storm Lake, IA Micropolitan Statistical Area.

== History ==
Buena Vista County was formed on January 15, 1851, from open land. It was named in memory of the Battle of Buena Vista in the Mexican–American War ending in 1848; the victorious United States annexed considerable territory as a result.

== Geography ==
According to the U.S. Census Bureau, the county has a total area of 580 square miles (1,500 km^{2}), of which 575 square miles (1,490 km^{2}) is land and 5.3 square miles (14 km^{2}) (0.9%) is water. The North Raccoon River originates in the county, north of Marathon.

=== Major highways ===
- U.S. Highway 71
- Iowa Highway 3
- Iowa Highway 7
- Iowa Highway 10
- Iowa Highway 110

=== Adjacent counties ===
- Clay County (north)
- Pocahontas County (east)
- Sac County (south)
- Cherokee County (west)

== Demographics ==
Historical population
Census	Pop.	Note	%±
1860	57		—
1870	1,585		2,680.7%
1880	7,537		375.5%
1890	13,548		79.8%
1900	16,975		25.3%
1910	15,981		−5.9%
1920	18,556		16.1%
1930	18,667		0.6%
1940	19,838		6.3%
1950	21,113		6.4%
1960	21,189		0.4%
1970	20,693		−2.3%
1980	20,774		0.4%
1990	19,965		−3.9%
2000	20,411		2.2%
2010	20,260		−0.7%
2020	20,823		2.8%
2025 (est.)	20,449	▼	−1.8%
U.S. Decennial Census; 1790–1960 1900–1990; 1990–2000 2010-2018

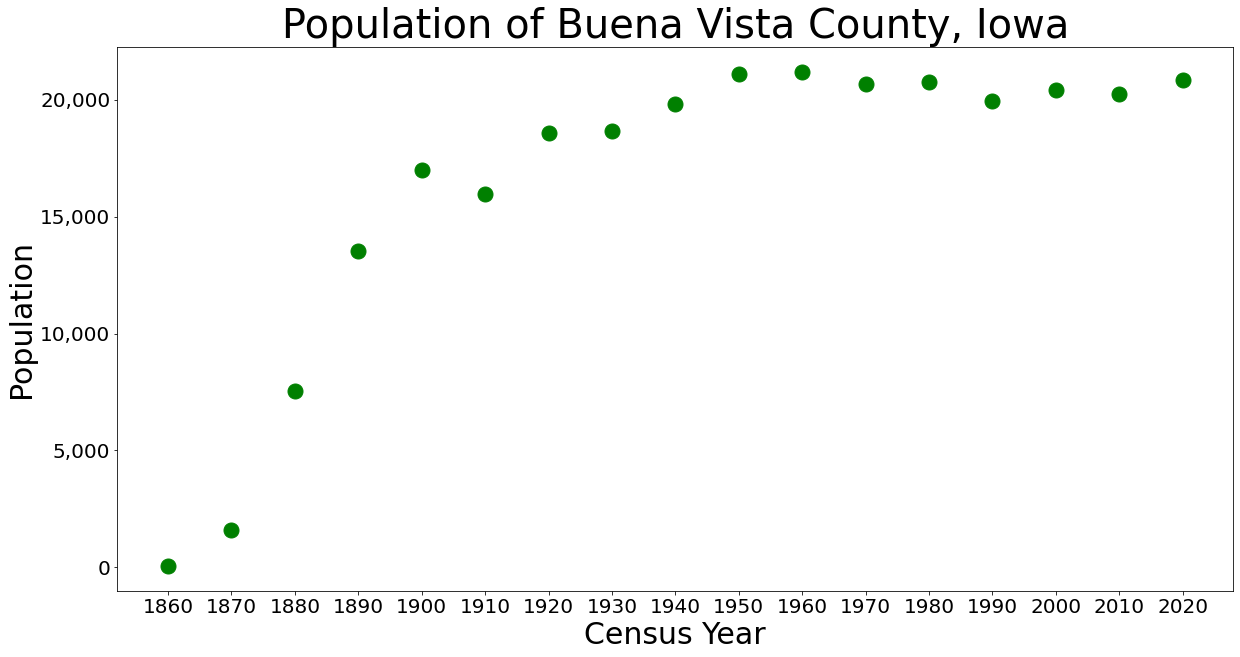

=== 2020 census ===
As of the 2020 census, Buena Vista County had a population of 20,823 and a population density of 36.0/sq mi (13.9/km^{2}). 89.44% of the population reported being of one race. There were 8,141 housing units, of which 7,447 were occupied.

The median age was 35.7 years. 26.4% of residents were under the age of 18 and 16.2% of residents were 65 years of age or older. For every 100 females there were 102.2 males, and for every 100 females age 18 and over there were 100.8 males.

There were 7,447 households in the county, of which 34.2% had children under the age of 18 living in them. Of all households, 52.3% were married-couple households, 18.8% were households with a male householder and no spouse or partner present, and 21.9% were households with a female householder and no spouse or partner present. About 27.0% of all households were made up of individuals and 12.3% had someone living alone who was 65 years of age or older.

There were 8,141 housing units, of which 8.5% were vacant. Among occupied housing units, 70.7% were owner-occupied and 29.3% were renter-occupied. The homeowner vacancy rate was 1.6% and the rental vacancy rate was 6.2%.

57.0% of residents lived in urban areas, while 43.0% lived in rural areas.

The racial makeup of the county was 60.5% White, 2.8% Black or African American, 0.6% American Indian and Alaska Native, 9.2% Asian, 3.0% Native Hawaiian and Pacific Islander, 13.4% from some other race, and 10.6% from two or more races. Hispanic or Latino residents of any race comprised 28.5% of the population.

Buena Vista County Racial Composition
Race	Number	Percent
White (NH)	11,377	54.63%
Black or African American (NH)	550	2.7%
Native American (NH)	29	0.14%
Asian (NH)	1,889	9.1%
Pacific Islander (NH)	614	3%
Other/Mixed (NH)	429	2.1%
Hispanic or Latino	5,925	28.5%

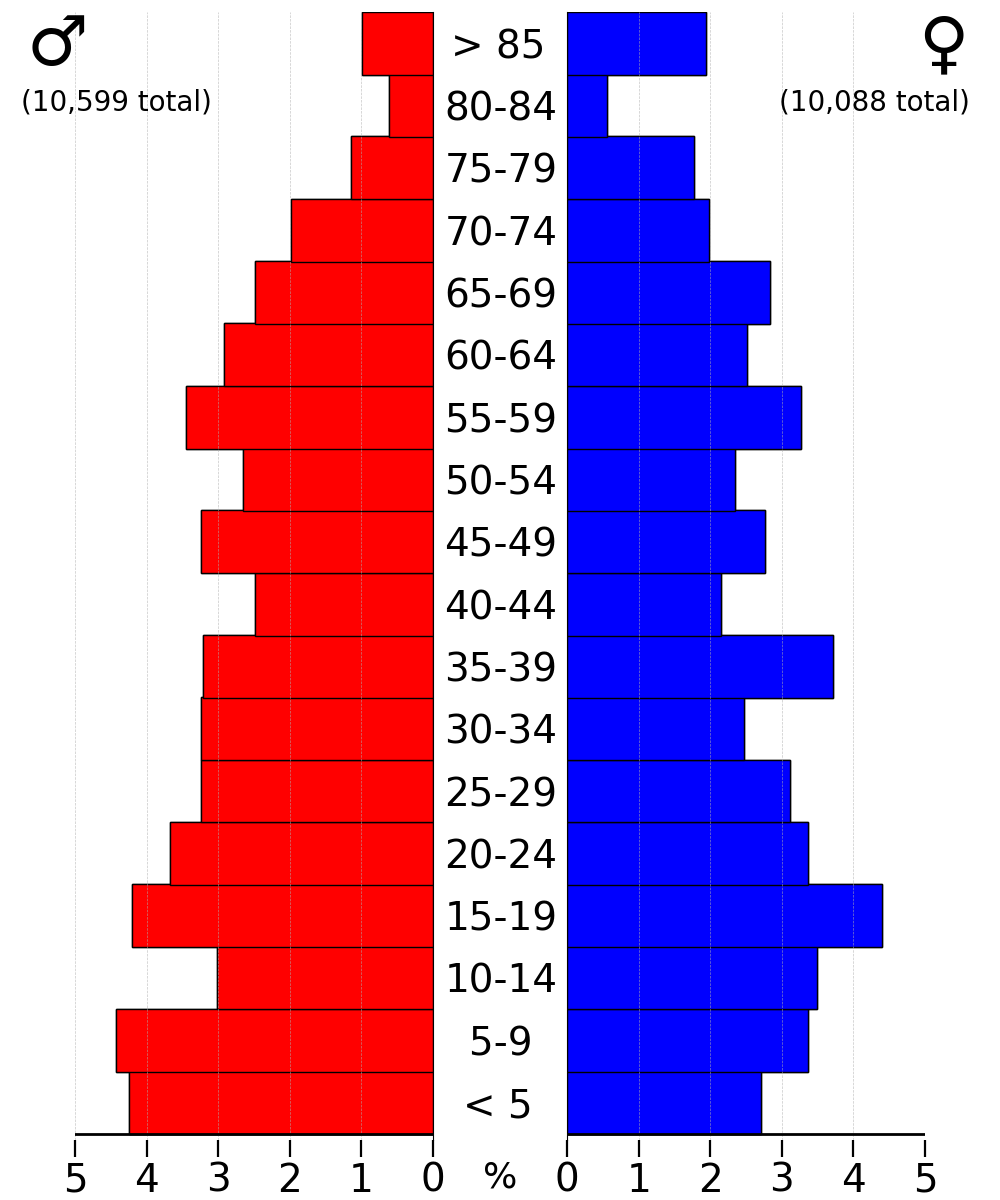
2022 US Census population pyramid for Buena Vista County from ACS 5-year estimates

=== 2010 census ===
The 2010 census recorded a population of 20,260 in the county, with a population density of 35.5/sq mi (13.7/km^{2}). There were 8,237 housing units, of which 7,522 were occupied.

=== 2000 census ===
As of the census of 2000, there were 20,411 people, 7,499 households, and 5,121 families residing in the county. The population density was 36 people per square mile (14 people/km^{2}). There were 8,145 housing units at an average density of 14 units per square mile (5.4 units/km^{2}). The racial makeup of the county was 88.00% White, 0.35% Black or African American, 0.13% Native American, 4.33% Asian, 0.01% Pacific Islander, 5.75% from other races, and 1.42% from two or more races. 12.54% of the population were Hispanic or Latino of any race.

2005 Census estimates of the racial origins of Buena Vista County's population indicated it had the lowest percentage of non-Hispanic Whites of any county in Iowa. The non-Hispanic whites constituted 76.1% of the county's population, with African-Americans being 1.3%, Asians 3.9% and Latinos 18.6% of the population.

There were 7,499 households, out of which 31.90% had children under the age of 18 living with them, 57.50% were married couples living together, 7.20% had a female householder with no husband present, and 31.70% were non-families. 27.00% of all households were made up of individuals, and 13.20% had someone living alone who was 65 years of age or older. The average household size was 2.54 and the average family size was 3.08.

In the county, the population was spread out, with 25.40% under the age of 18, 12.20% from 18 to 24, 25.40% from 25 to 44, 20.20% from 45 to 64, and 16.90% who were 65 years of age or older. The median age was 36 years. For every 100 females there were 100.40 males. For every 100 females age 18 and over, there were 97.40 males.

The median income for a household in the county was $35,300, and the median income for a family was $41,549. Males had a median income of $29,172 versus $20,252 for females. The per capita income for the county was $16,042. About 7.60% of families and 10.50% of the population were below the poverty line, including 12.60% of those under age 18 and 7.60% of those age 65 or over.

== Law enforcement ==

Law enforcement is the responsibility of the Buena Vista County Sheriff's Office (BVSO). The department provides law enforcement services for all areas of Buena Vista County, as well as providing for courthouse security, operating the county jail, and performing civil procedures. The current Sheriff is Kory Elston. The staff includes a mix of full-time deputies and reserve deputies.

The Buena Vista County Sheriff's Office is located at 411 Expansion Blvd in Storm Lake, Iowa.

Reserve officers from the Buena Vista County Sheriff's Office received the Donald H. Mackaman Outstanding Unit Award at the 2013 state reserve conference.

== Communities ==
=== Cities ===
- Albert City
- Alta
- Lakeside
- Linn Grove
- Marathon
- Newell
- Rembrandt
- Sioux Rapids
- Storm Lake
- Truesdale

=== Townships ===
Buena Vista County is divided into sixteen townships:

- Barnes
- Brooke
- Coon
- Elk
- Fairfield
- Grant
- Hayes
- Lee
- Lincoln
- Maple Valley
- Newell
- Nokomis
- Poland
- Providence
- Scott
- Washington

=== Population ranking ===
The population ranking of the following table is based on the 2020 census of Buena Vista County.

† county seat

Rank	City/Town/etc.	Municipal type	Population (2020 Census)
1	† Storm Lake	City	11,269
2	Alta	City	2,087
3	Newell	City	906
4	Sioux Rapids	City	748
5	Lakeside	City	700
6	Albert City	City	677
7	Marathon	City	230
8	Rembrandt	City	209
9	Linn Grove	City	163
10	Truesdale	City	69

== Politics ==
Buena Vista County has mostly voted Republican throughout its history, only failing to back the party's candidates in a presidential election eight times throughout its history. The first of these instances was in 1912 when the Republican vote was split between incumbent William Howard Taft & former President Theodore Roosevelt, who won a majority of the county's votes as a third-party candidate. Five of the instances were national landslides for the Democratic Party in all four of Franklin D. Roosevelt's victories as well as Lyndon B. Johnson's 1964 landslide. The other two Democratic victories were in 1948 as Harry S. Truman narrowly won the county & statewide by a similar margin, & 40 years later in 1988 as Michael Dukakis was boosted statewide by the 1980s farm crisis despite his national landslide loss.

United States presidential election results for Buena Vista County, Iowa
Year	Republican		Democratic		Third party(ies)	
Year	No.	%	No.	%	No.	%
1896	2,568	67.63%	1,178	31.02%	51	1.34%
1900	2,632	71.25%	936	25.34%	126	3.41%
1904	2,483	76.17%	605	18.56%	172	5.28%
1908	2,337	65.94%	1,054	29.74%	153	4.32%
1912	755	20.77%	921	25.34%	1,959	53.89%
1916	2,045	57.38%	1,454	40.80%	65	1.82%
1920	4,927	78.58%	1,204	19.20%	139	2.22%
1924	3,812	52.38%	683	9.39%	2,782	38.23%
1928	5,087	65.47%	2,609	33.58%	74	0.95%
1932	3,162	38.51%	4,835	58.89%	213	2.59%
1936	3,334	37.95%	5,287	60.18%	164	1.87%
1940	4,576	48.69%	4,784	50.90%	39	0.41%
1944	3,993	48.06%	4,277	51.47%	39	0.47%
1948	3,959	46.61%	4,340	51.10%	194	2.28%
1952	7,539	69.72%	3,254	30.09%	20	0.18%
1956	6,470	61.25%	4,083	38.65%	10	0.09%
1960	6,351	63.54%	3,637	36.38%	8	0.08%
1964	3,747	41.65%	5,245	58.30%	5	0.06%
1968	5,599	61.87%	3,051	33.71%	400	4.42%
1972	5,685	61.25%	3,460	37.28%	136	1.47%
1976	5,126	53.58%	4,227	44.18%	214	2.24%
1980	5,272	54.49%	3,468	35.84%	936	9.67%
1984	5,193	55.22%	4,109	43.69%	103	1.10%
1988	4,170	47.25%	4,580	51.90%	75	0.85%
1992	3,863	41.73%	3,374	36.45%	2,020	21.82%
1996	3,636	45.65%	3,420	42.94%	909	11.41%
2000	4,354	54.58%	3,297	41.33%	326	4.09%
2004	4,887	57.56%	3,520	41.46%	83	0.98%
2008	4,223	50.15%	4,075	48.40%	122	1.45%
2012	4,554	54.32%	3,700	44.14%	129	1.54%
2016	4,903	59.23%	2,856	34.50%	519	6.27%
2020	5,056	61.91%	2,961	36.26%	150	1.84%
2024	4,962	65.84%	2,462	32.67%	113	1.50%

== Education ==
School districts include:

- Albert City–Truesdale Community School District
- Alta–Aurelia Community School District - Formed on July 1, 2018.
- Galva–Holstein Community School District - Formed on July 1, 1980.
- Laurens–Marathon Community School District - Formed on July 1, 1976.
- Newell-Fonda Community School District - Formed on July 1, 1993.
- Schaller-Crestland Community School District - Formed on July 1, 1993.
- Sioux Central Community School District - Formed on July 1, 1993.
- Storm Lake Community School District

Former school districts:

- Alta Community School District - Merged into Alta-Aurelia on July 1, 2018.
- South Clay Community School District - Voluntarily dissolved on July 1, 2010.

== See also ==
- National Register of Historic Places listings in Buena Vista County, Iowa
