= Poland Township, Buena Vista County, Iowa =

Township in Iowa, US

Poland Township, Buena Vista County
- Township
- Coordinates: 42°51′50″N 094°58′35″W
- Country: United States
- State: Iowa
- County: Buena Vista

Area
  - Total: 36.79 sq mi (95.28 km^{2})
  - Land: 36.51 sq mi (94.56 km^{2})
  - Water: 0.28 sq mi (0.72 km^{2})
- Elevation: 1,391 ft (424 m)

Population (2000)
  - Total: 529
  - Density: 15/sq mi (5.6/km^{2})
- FIPS code: 19-93435
- GNIS feature ID: 0468553

Poland Township is one of sixteen townships in Buena Vista County, Iowa, United States. As of the 2000 census, its population was 529.

== Geography ==
Poland Township covers an area of 36.79 square miles (95.3 km^{2}) and contains one incorporated settlement, Marathon. According to the USGS, it contains two cemeteries: Garton Graveyard and Poland.
