= Lincoln Township, Buena Vista County, Iowa =

Township in Iowa, US

Lincoln Township, Buena Vista County
- Township
- Coordinates: 42°46′33″N 095°05′33″W
- Country: United States
- State: Iowa
- County: Buena Vista

Area
  - Total: 36.3 sq mi (93.9 km^{2})
  - Land: 36.3 sq mi (93.9 km^{2})
  - Water: 0 sq mi (0 km^{2})
- Elevation: 1,270 ft (387 m)

Population (2020)
  - Total: 163
  - Density: 4.5/sq mi (1.7/km^{2})
- FIPS code: 19-92529
- GNIS feature ID: 0468242

Lincoln Township is one of 18 townships in Buena Vista County, Iowa. As of the 2020 census, its population was 163.

== Geography ==
Lincoln Township covers an area of 36.25 square miles (93.9 km^{2}) and it does not contain incorporated settlements. According to the USGS, it contains one cemetery, Lincoln Township.
