= Lakeside, Iowa =

- City
- Location of Lakeside, Iowa
- Coordinates: 42°37′03″N 95°10′38″W
- Country: USA
- State: Iowa
- County: Buena Vista

Area
  - Total: 0.22 sq mi (0.57 km^{2})
  - Land: 0.22 sq mi (0.57 km^{2})
  - Water: 0 sq mi (0.00 km^{2})
- Elevation: 1,401 ft (427 m)

Population (2020)
  - Total: 700
  - Density: 3,207/sq mi (1,238.1/km^{2})
- Time zone: UTC-6 (Central (CST))
  - Summer (DST): UTC-5 (CDT)
- ZIP code: 50588
- Area code: 712
- FIPS code: 19-42645
- GNIS feature ID: 2395612
- Website: lakesideia.com

Lakeside is a city in Buena Vista County, Iowa, United States. The population was 700 at the time of the 2020 census. It is the most densely populated city in Iowa.

== Geography ==
According to the United States Census Bureau, the city has a total area of 0.18 square miles (0.47 km^{2}), all land.

== Demographics ==
Historical populations
Year	Pop.	±%
1940	103	—
1950	219	+112.6%
1960	306	+39.7%
1970	353	+15.4%
1980	589	+66.9%
1990	522	−11.4%
2000	484	−7.3%
2010	596	+23.1%
2020	700	+17.4%
Source:"U.S. Census website". United States Census Bureau. and Iowa Data Center; Source: U.S. Decennial Census

=== 2020 census ===
As of the census of 2020, there were 700 people, 253 households, and 194 families residing in the city. The population density was 3,206.7 inhabitants per square mile (1,238.1/km^{2}). There were 287 housing units at an average density of 1,314.7 per square mile (507.6/km^{2}). The racial makeup of the city was 60.3% White, 2.3% Black or African American, 0.0% Native American, 6.7% Asian, 3.7% Pacific Islander, 16.1% from other races and 10.9% from two or more races. Hispanic or Latino persons of any race comprised 38.1% of the population.

Of the 253 households, 32.4% of which had children under the age of 18 living with them, 58.9% were married couples living together, 7.1% were cohabitating couples, 20.2% had a female householder with no spouse or partner present and 13.8% had a male householder with no spouse or partner present. 23.3% of all households were non-families. 19.0% of all households were made up of individuals, 9.5% had someone living alone who was 65 years old or older.

The median age in the city was 40.5 years. 28.6% of the residents were under the age of 20; 5.0% were between the ages of 20 and 24; 22.3% were from 25 and 44; 27.0% were from 45 and 64; and 17.1% were 65 years of age or older. The gender makeup of the city was 50.6% male and 49.4% female.

=== 2010 census ===
As of the census of 2010, there were 596 people, 215 households, and 153 families living in the city. The population density was 3,311.1 inhabitants per square mile (1,278.4/km^{2}). There were 233 housing units at an average density of 1,294.4 per square mile (499.8/km^{2}). The racial makeup of the city was 76.7% White, 2.2% African American, 0.2% Native American, 5.7% Asian, 0.3% Pacific Islander, 10.6% from other races, and 4.4% from two or more races. Hispanic or Latino of any race were 32.0% of the population.

There were 215 households, of which 32.6% had children under the age of 18 living with them, 61.4% were married couples living together, 7.0% had a female householder with no husband present, 2.8% had a male householder with no wife present, and 28.8% were non-families. 24.2% of all households were made up of individuals, and 8.9% had someone living alone who was 65 years of age or older. The average household size was 2.77 and the average family size was 3.33.

The median age in the city was 34.3 years. 30.2% of residents were under the age of 18; 8.2% were between the ages of 18 and 24; 21.3% were from 25 to 44; 29.4% were from 45 to 64; and 10.9% were 65 years of age or older. The gender makeup of the city was 48.5% male and 51.5% female.

=== 2000 census ===
As of the census of 2000, there were 484 people, 184 households, and 126 families living in the city. The population density was 2,662.6 inhabitants per square mile (1,028.0/km^{2}). There were 211 housing units at an average density of 1,160.7 per square mile (448.1/km^{2}). The racial makeup of the city was 79.34% White, 0.21% Native American, 9.09% Asian, 9.30% from other races, and 2.07% from two or more races. Hispanic or Latino of any race were 19.21% of the population.

There were 184 households, out of which 36.4% had children under the age of 18 living with them, 60.9% were married couples living together, 4.3% had a female householder with no husband present, and 31.5% were non-families. 23.9% of all households were made up of individuals, and 10.9% had someone living alone who was 65 years of age or older. The average household size was 2.63 and the average family size was 3.19.

In the city, the population was spread out, with 27.5% under the age of 18, 10.3% from 18 to 24, 27.3% from 25 to 44, 22.5% from 45 to 64, and 12.4% who were 65 years of age or older. The median age was 36 years. For every 100 females, there were 100.8 males. For every 100 females age 18 and over, there were 98.3 males.

The median income for a household in the city was $39,135, and the median income for a family was $43,281. Males had a median income of $30,625 versus $19,342 for females. The per capita income for the city was $15,724. About 4.2% of families and 7.3% of the population were below the poverty line, including 7.9% of those under age 18 and 4.5% of those age 65 or over.

== Education ==
It is in the Storm Lake Community School District.
