= Truesdale, Iowa =

- City
- Location of Truesdale, Iowa
- Coordinates: 42°43′45″N 95°11′00″W
- Country: US
- State: Iowa
- County: Buena Vista
- Incorporated: May 15, 1917

Area
  - Total: 0.15 sq mi (0.38 km^{2})
  - Land: 0.15 sq mi (0.38 km^{2})
  - Water: 0 sq mi (0.00 km^{2})
- Elevation: 1,371 ft (418 m)

Population (2020)
  - Total: 69
  - Density: 473.0/sq mi (182.62/km^{2})
- Time zone: UTC-6 (Central (CST))
  - Summer (DST): UTC-5 (CDT)
- ZIP code: 50592
- Area code: 712
- FIPS code: 19-79095
- GNIS feature ID: 2397064

Truesdale is a city in Buena Vista County, Iowa, United States. The population was 69 at the time of the 2020 census. The Truesdale post office opened in 1900.

== Geography ==
According to the United States Census Bureau, the city has a total area of 0.14 square miles (0.36 km^{2}), all land.

== Demographics ==
Historical populations
Year	Pop.	±%
1920	113	—
1930	116	+2.7%
1940	135	+16.4%
1950	158	+17.0%
1960	153	−3.2%
1970	132	−13.7%
1980	128	−3.0%
1990	132	+3.1%
2000	91	−31.1%
2010	81	−11.0%
2020	69	−14.8%
Source:"U.S. Census website". United States Census Bureau. and Iowa Data Center; Source: U.S. Decennial Census

=== 2020 census ===
As of the census of 2020, there were 69 people, 31 households, and 13 families living in the city. The population density was 473.0 inhabitants per square mile (182.6/km^{2}). There were 41 housing units at an average density of 281.0 per square mile (108.5/km^{2}). The racial makeup of the city was 79.7% White, 0.0% Black or African American, 0.0% Native American, 10.1% Asian, 0.0% Pacific Islander, 4.3% from other races and 5.8% from two or more races. Hispanic or Latino persons of any race comprised 7.2% of the population.

Of the 31 households, 16.1% of which had children under the age of 18 living with them, 29.0% were married couples living together, 6.5% were cohabitating couples, 29.0% had a female householder with no spouse or partner present and 35.5% had a male householder with no spouse or partner present. 58.1% of all households were non-families. 51.6% of all households were made up of individuals, 19.4% had someone living alone who was 65 years old or older.

The median age in the city was 48.2 years. 17.4% of the residents were under the age of 20; 2.9% were between the ages of 20 and 24; 27.5% were from 25 and 44; 27.5% were from 45 and 64; and 24.6% were 65 years of age or older. The gender makeup of the city was 58.0% male and 42.0% female.

=== 2010 census ===
As of the census of 2010, there were 81 people, 37 households, and 24 families living in the city. The population density was 578.6 inhabitants per square mile (223.4/km^{2}). There were 40 housing units at an average density of 285.7 per square mile (110.3/km^{2}). The racial makeup of the city was 98.8% White and 1.2% African American. Hispanic or Latino of any race were 1.2% of the population.

There were 37 households, of which 29.7% had children under the age of 18 living with them, 48.6% were married couples living together, 8.1% had a female householder with no husband present, 8.1% had a male householder with no wife present, and 35.1% were non-families. 29.7% of all households were made up of individuals, and 10.8% had someone living alone who was 65 years of age or older. The average household size was 2.19 and the average family size was 2.71.

The median age in the city was 47.8 years. 18.5% of residents were under the age of 18; 4.9% were between the ages of 18 and 24; 19.7% were from 25 to 44; 42% were from 45 to 64; and 14.8% were 65 years of age or older. The gender makeup of the city was 56.8% male and 43.2% female.

=== 2000 census ===
As of the census of 2000, there were 91 people, 39 households, and 26 families living in the city. The population density was 649.3 inhabitants per square mile (250.7/km^{2}). There were 47 housing units at an average density of 335.4 per square mile (129.5/km^{2}). The racial makeup of the city was 100.00% White.

There were 39 households, out of which 17.9% had children under the age of 18 living with them, 43.6% were married couples living together, 15.4% had a female householder with no husband present, and 33.3% were non-families. 30.8% of all households were made up of individuals, and 5.1% had someone living alone who was 65 years of age or older. The average household size was 2.33 and the average family size was 2.96.

In the city, the population was spread out, with 15.4% under the age of 18, 9.9% from 18 to 24, 34.1% from 25 to 44, 25.3% from 45 to 64, and 15.4% who were 65 years of age or older. The median age was 42 years. For every 100 females, there were 111.6 males. For every 100 females age 18 and over, there were 120.0 males.

The median income for a household in the city was $29,063, and the median income for a family was $35,625. Males had a median income of $28,750 versus $17,188 for females. The per capita income for the city was $15,410. There were no families and 4.0% of the population living below the poverty line, including no under eighteens and 15.4% of those over 64.

== Education ==
Albert City–Truesdale Community School District serves the community.
