= Sioux Rapids, Iowa =

- City
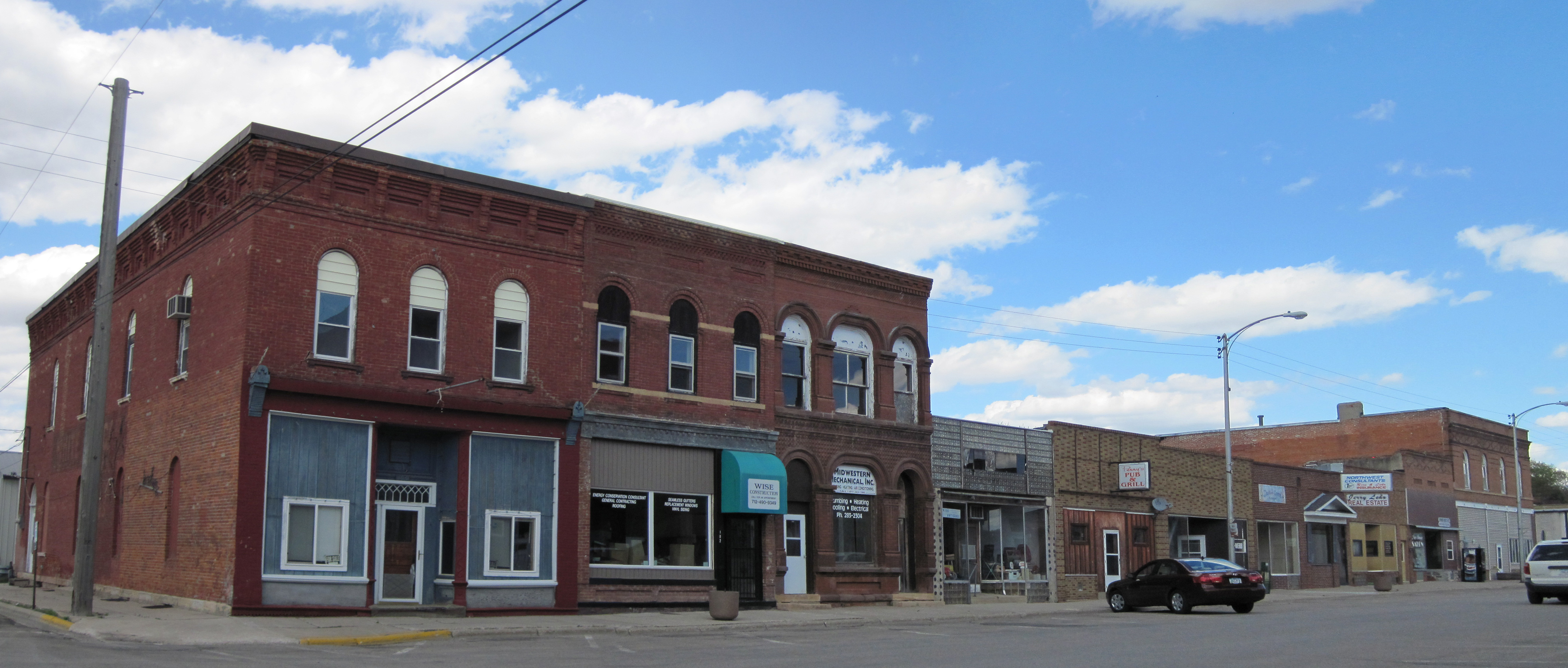
- Street scene in Sioux Rapids

- Location of Sioux Rapids, Iowa
- Coordinates: 42°53′30″N 95°08′55″W
- Country: US
- State: Iowa
- County: Buena Vista
- Incorporated: April 6, 1882

Area
  - Total: 0.82 sq mi (2.12 km^{2})
  - Land: 0.82 sq mi (2.12 km^{2})
  - Water: 0 sq mi (0.00 km^{2})
- Elevation: 1,283 ft (391 m)

Population (2020)
  - Total: 748
  - Density: 913/sq mi (352.4/km^{2})
- Time zone: UTC-6 (Central (CST))
  - Summer (DST): UTC-5 (CDT)
- ZIP code: 50585
- Area code: 712
- FIPS code: 19-73425
- GNIS feature ID: 468721

Sioux Rapids is a city in Buena Vista County, Iowa, United States. The population was 748 at the time of the 2020 census.

== History ==
Two early surveyors, Lane and Ray, found the area so attractive for settlement that in 1855 they illegally laid a claim and built a cabin in section 12 of Barnes Township and over-wintered there. William S. Lee was a wealthy New Yorker who came to Sioux Rapids in 1858, staked a very early claim, and soon controversially acquired around 60,000 acres (24,000 ha) of "swamp land" at 16¢ ($5.95 in 2025) per acre, totaling roughly $9,600 ($357,231 in 2025). For this he was contracted to build a courthouse and construct a bridge over the Little Sioux River, but never did. He sold large amounts of this land, but after years of legal action, Lee and his purchasers lost all their claims in 1882 in a final case against them. Lee returned to New York in 1863 to educate his children, returning in 1868 to find his early claim had been "jumped" by a William Fuller. In 1870, after reversal of an earlier decision, Fuller was allowed to keep his land, in a protracted case finally decided by the US Secretary of the Interior. In 1868, Fletcher Americus Blake he built the first frame house in Sioux Rapids, and with T.W. Twiford the first flour mill in the county, using the Little Sioux River for water power. His mill also operated as a saw mill. In the 1870 census, he is listed as a manufacturer with real estate worth $4,500 ($114,572 in 2025). Blake was the first postmaster in Sioux Rapids and the first person from the county to be elected to the Iowa House, serving in the 1872 session. That year he sold his mill and moved to Denver for health reasons. In 1869 David Evans and lawyer D. C. Thomas bought out the Ridgeway homestead and the present town of Sioux Rapids was platted out. On the Lee 1870 census, David is a substantial landowner and also blacksmith. He was in this business with his son-in-law H. W. Mayne until 1881. In 1889 he sold his remaining town lots to buy a farm in Clay County near Linn Grove. During the 50th anniversary for Sioux Rapids, on July 4, 1905, Evans rode together in the "Historic Parade" with his 89 year old, long time buddy, Johnny Burr, another ex-soldier pioneer hunter-trapper and faithful attendant at Abner Bell's deathbed in 1895. The Evans and their wives are buried at Linn Grove, with many other Welsh pioneers. Sioux Rapids was named from the Rapids on the Little Sioux River. In 1869, Sioux Rapids was designated the county seat of Buena Vista County. In 1876, the courthouse at Sioux Rapids burned, and in 1878, the county seat was transferred to Storm Lake.

== Geography ==
Sioux Rapids is located on the Little Sioux River.

According to the United States Census Bureau, the city has a total area of 0.82 square miles (2.12 km^{2}), all land.

Gustafson Lake, as well as Gabrielson Park, are located south of the town.

=== Climate ===
Climate data for Sioux Rapids, Iowa (1991−2020 normals, extremes 1941−present)
Month	Jan	Feb	Mar	Apr	May	Jun	Jul	Aug	Sep	Oct	Nov	Dec	Year
Record high °F (°C)	68 (20)	67 (19)	87 (31)	94 (34)	103 (39)	105 (41)	107 (42)	105 (41)	101 (38)	95 (35)	81 (27)	68 (20)	107 (42)
Mean maximum °F (°C)	46.9 (8.3)	51.0 (10.6)	69.5 (20.8)	82.9 (28.3)	89.5 (31.9)	92.7 (33.7)	91.6 (33.1)	90.0 (32.2)	88.0 (31.1)	82.6 (28.1)	66.9 (19.4)	50.4 (10.2)	95.0 (35.0)
Mean daily maximum °F (°C)	25.3 (−3.7)	29.9 (−1.2)	43.1 (6.2)	58.2 (14.6)	69.9 (21.1)	79.9 (26.6)	81.9 (27.7)	79.2 (26.2)	73.6 (23.1)	60.5 (15.8)	43.9 (6.6)	29.8 (−1.2)	56.3 (13.5)
Daily mean °F (°C)	16.7 (−8.5)	21.4 (−5.9)	33.9 (1.1)	47.1 (8.4)	59.1 (15.1)	69.5 (20.8)	72.1 (22.3)	69.2 (20.7)	62.4 (16.9)	49.5 (9.7)	34.5 (1.4)	21.9 (−5.6)	46.4 (8.0)
Mean daily minimum °F (°C)	8.2 (−13.2)	12.8 (−10.7)	24.7 (−4.1)	36.0 (2.2)	48.3 (9.1)	59.1 (15.1)	62.2 (16.8)	59.3 (15.2)	51.1 (10.6)	38.5 (3.6)	25.1 (−3.8)	14.0 (−10.0)	36.6 (2.6)
Mean minimum °F (°C)	−15.5 (−26.4)	−10.2 (−23.4)	1.0 (−17.2)	19.1 (−7.2)	32.6 (0.3)	45.7 (7.6)	49.9 (9.9)	47.7 (8.7)	33.7 (0.9)	20.4 (−6.4)	5.7 (−14.6)	−9.6 (−23.1)	−18.7 (−28.2)
Record low °F (°C)	−32 (−36)	−32 (−36)	−29 (−34)	3 (−16)	23 (−5)	34 (1)	41 (5)	34 (1)	18 (−8)	9 (−13)	−17 (−27)	−27 (−33)	−32 (−36)
Average precipitation inches (mm)	0.62 (16)	0.83 (21)	1.76 (45)	3.58 (91)	4.19 (106)	5.05 (128)	3.29 (84)	4.41 (112)	3.39 (86)	2.51 (64)	1.42 (36)	0.94 (24)	31.99 (813)
Average snowfall inches (cm)	8.0 (20)	6.9 (18)	6.5 (17)	2.3 (5.8)	0.3 (0.76)	0.0 (0.0)	0.0 (0.0)	0.0 (0.0)	0.0 (0.0)	0.7 (1.8)	3.8 (9.7)	6.7 (17)	35.2 (89)
Average precipitation days (≥ 0.01 in)	5.7	6.4	7.1	9.7	12.2	10.9	8.2	8.1	7.7	8.0	5.8	6.0	95.8
Average snowy days (≥ 0.1 in)	6.1	5.4	3.4	1.2	0.0	0.0	0.0	0.0	0.0	0.6	2.6	5.5	24.8
Source: NOAA

== Demographics ==
Historical populations
Year	Pop.	±%
1870	61	—
1880	181	+196.7%
1890	650	+259.1%
1900	1,005	+54.6%
1910	868	−13.6%
1920	1,080	+24.4%
1930	958	−11.3%
1940	1,056	+10.2%
1950	1,010	−4.4%
1960	962	−4.8%
1970	813	−15.5%
1980	897	+10.3%
1990	792	−11.7%
2000	720	−9.1%
2010	775	+7.6%
2020	748	−3.5%
Source:"U.S. Census website". United States Census Bureau. and Iowa Data Center; Source: U.S. Decennial Census

=== 2020 census ===
As of the census of 2020, there were 748 people, 317 households, and 192 families residing in the city. The population density was 912.7 inhabitants per square mile (352.4/km^{2}). There were 363 housing units at an average density of 442.9 per square mile (171.0/km^{2}). The racial makeup of the city was 88.0% White, 0.7% Black or African American, 0.4% Native American, 0.0% Asian, 0.0% Pacific Islander, 5.1% from other races and 5.9% from two or more races. Hispanic or Latino persons of any race comprised 10.8% of the population.

Of the 317 households, 30.3% of which had children under the age of 18 living with them, 43.5% were married couples living together, 5.7% were cohabitating couples, 26.2% had a female householder with no spouse or partner present and 24.6% had a male householder with no spouse or partner present. 39.4% of all households were non-families. 33.8% of all households were made up of individuals, 14.8% had someone living alone who was 65 years old or older.

The median age in the city was 40.7 years. 27.5% of the residents were under the age of 20; 4.5% were between the ages of 20 and 24; 25.4% were from 25 and 44; 23.1% were from 45 and 64; and 19.4% were 65 years of age or older. The gender makeup of the city was 52.8% male and 47.2% female.

=== 2010 census ===
As of the census of 2010, there were 775 people, 325 households, and 196 families residing in the city. The population density was 945.1 inhabitants per square mile (364.9/km^{2}). There were 367 housing units at an average density of 447.6 per square mile (172.8/km^{2}). The racial makeup of the city was 94.3% White, 0.6% African American, 0.1% Native American, 0.4% Asian, 3.9% from other races, and 0.6% from two or more races. Hispanic or Latino of any race were 8.4% of the population.

There were 325 households, of which 30.5% had children under the age of 18 living with them, 45.2% were married couples living together, 9.5% had a female householder with no husband present, 5.5% had a male householder with no wife present, and 39.7% were non-families. 36.9% of all households were made up of individuals, and 14.8% had someone living alone who was 65 years of age or older. The average household size was 2.30 and the average family size was 3.02.

The median age in the city was 40.8 years. 26.7% of residents were under the age of 18; 5% were between the ages of 18 and 24; 23.2% were from 25 to 44; 25.2% were from 45 to 64; and 19.9% were 65 years of age or older. The gender makeup of the city was 49.8% male and 50.2% female.

=== 2000 census ===
As of the census of 2000, there were 720 people, 306 households, and 201 families residing in the city. The population density was 877.0 inhabitants per square mile (338.6/km^{2}). There were 338 housing units at an average density of 411.7 per square mile (159.0/km^{2}). The racial makeup of the city was 98.75% White, 0.14% Asian, 0.28% from other races, and 0.83% from two or more races. Hispanic or Latino of any race were 1.39% of the population.

There were 306 households, out of which 27.5% had children under the age of 18 living with them, 52.6% were married couples living together, 9.8% had a female householder with no husband present, and 34.0% were non-families. 31.7% of all households were made up of individuals, and 16.7% had someone living alone who was 65 years of age or older. The average household size was 2.28 and the average family size was 2.84.

In the city, the population was spread out, with 24.9% under the age of 18, 7.1% from 18 to 24, 22.5% from 25 to 44, 21.9% from 45 to 64, and 23.6% who were 65 years of age or older. The median age was 42 years. For every 100 females, there were 94.6 males. For every 100 females age 18 and over, there were 86.6 males.

The median income for a household in the city was $33,250, and the median income for a family was $40,417. Males had a median income of $35,000 versus $18,929 for females. The per capita income for the city was $16,759. About 5.8% of families and 6.4% of the population were below the poverty line, including 7.4% of those under age 18 and 4.6% of those age 65 or over.

== Arts and culture ==
Sioux Rapids hosts its "Tall Corn Days" festival every year near the end of July. In the past, this has included a parade, street dance, sweet corn feed, a 5k run/walk, a kids fire fight game, a lunch at the city park, and various sports tournaments.

The town is home to several churches, including a Lutheran, Baptist, and Methodist denominations.

Sioux Rapids also has an historical museum/theater, a swimming pool, an American Legion Post, a community center, and various local businesses.

== Education ==
Sioux Central Community School District serves the community; it operates a K-12 school south of Sioux Rapids on Highway 71.

Before the consolidation, Sioux Rapids had its own school near the center of the town. Sioux Rapids was a part of the Sioux Rapids Community School District until July 1, 1979, when it merged with the Rembrandt school district to form the Sioux Rapids-Rembrandt School District. That district consolidated with the Sioux Valley School District into Sioux Central on July 1, 1993.

== Transportation ==
U.S. Route 71 (concurrently with Highway 10) runs north–south through Sioux Rapids, with Spencer situated approximately 18 miles north on 71 and Storm Lake approximately 20 miles south. Sioux Rapids is also about 45 minutes south of Okoboji.

== Notable people ==
- Guy Gabrielson (1891–1976) New Jersey Republican politician.
- Ira Noel Gabrielson (1889–1977) American naturalist and entomologist.
- Fleta Jan Brown Spencer (1882-1938), composer and songwriter, born near Sioux Rapids.
