= Nokomis Township, Buena Vista County, Iowa =

Township in Iowa, US

Nokomis Township, Buena Vista County
- Township
- Coordinates: 42°41′08″N 095°20′11″W
- Country: United States
- State: Iowa
- County: Buena Vista

Area
  - Total: 35.93 sq mi (93.05 km^{2})
  - Land: 35.90 sq mi (92.99 km^{2})
  - Water: 0.023 sq mi (0.06 km^{2})
- Elevation: 1,434 ft (437 m)

Population (2000)
  - Total: 2,244
  - Density: 62/sq mi (24.1/km^{2})
- FIPS code: 19-93129
- GNIS feature ID: 0468448

Nokomis Township is one of sixteen townships in Buena Vista County, Iowa, USA. As of the 2000 census, its population was 2,244.

== Geography ==
Nokomis Township covers an area of 35.93 square miles (93.1 km^{2}) and contains one incorporated settlement, Alta. According to the USGS, it contains two cemeteries: Scandinavian and Woodlawn.
