= Sioux Central Community School District =

Public school district in Buena Vista County, Iowa, United States

Coordinates: 42.874040°N 95.149513°W

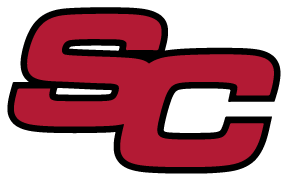

Location
- Buena Vista County, Iowa Buena Vista, Clay, Cherokee, and O'Brien counties Sioux Rapids, Buena Vista, Iowa; United States
- Coordinates: 42.874040, -95.149513

District information
- Type: Local school district
- Motto: Today's Learners to Tomorrow's Leaders
- Grades: K–12
- Established: 1993
- Superintendent: Kevin Wood
- Schools: 3
- Budget: $9,787,000 (2020-21)
- NCES District ID: 1900023

Students and staff
- Students: 656 (2022-23)
- Teachers: 51.65 FTE
- Staff: 65.74 FTE
- Student–teacher ratio: 12.70
- Athletic conference: Twin Lakes
- District mascot: Rebels
- Colors: Silver, red, and white

Other information
- Website: www.siouxcentral.org

Sioux Central Community School District is a rural public school district headquartered in unincorporated Buena Vista County, Iowa, south of Sioux Rapids.

The district covers portions of Buena Vista and Clay counties, as well as small sections of Cherokee and O'Brien counties. It serves Sioux Rapids, Linn Grove, Peterson, Rembrandt, and Webb.

Since 2004, it has had an arrangement with the Albert City–Truesdale Community School District where that district sends its high school students to Sioux Central High School. This means Sioux Central High School is the secondary school in Iowa with the seventh-largest attendance boundary as it covers 370 square miles (960 km^{2}) of area.

== History ==
The four principal towns making up the Sioux Central district each had its own school system at one time. In the early 1960s, Linn Grove and Peterson merged their school districts to form the Sioux Valley CSD. In 1979, Rembrandt and Sioux Rapids merged their school districts to form the Sioux Rapids-Rembrandt CSD. Then in 1990, Sioux Valley and Sioux Rapids-Rembrandt began sharing to form the Sioux Central CSD.

The district was formed on July 1, 1993, by the merger of the Sioux Rapids-Rembrandt Community School District and the Sioux Valley Community School District. Sioux Rapids-Rembrandt served the communities of Sioux Rapids and Rembrandt while Sioux Valley served the communities of Linn Grove and Peterson.

The current school facility opened in 1997; it was a consolidation of four previous campuses.

On July 1, 2010, the South Clay Community School District was dissolved, and portions went to Sioux Central. That annexation of territory made the Sioux Central district the 33rd largest Iowa school district in area, with 254 square miles (660 km^{2}) of land. Webb and the areas south of Gillett Grove were reassigned to Sioux Central.

== Schools ==
The district operates three schools, all in the same building in Sioux Rapids:

- Sioux Central Elementary School
- Sioux Central Middle School
- Sioux Central High School

=== Sioux Central High School ===
==== Athletics ====
The Rebels compete in the Twin Lakes Conference in the following sports:

- Cross Country
- Volleyball
- Football
- Basketball
- Wrestling (as Laurens-Marathon-Sioux Central)
- Track and Field
- Golf
- Baseball
- Softball

== See also ==
- List of school districts in Iowa
- List of high schools in Iowa
