= Rembrandt, Iowa =

- City
- Location of Rembrandt, Iowa
- Coordinates: 42°49′33″N 95°09′56″W
- Country: US
- State: Iowa
- County: Buena Vista
- Incorporated: August 12, 1901

Area
  - Total: 0.24 sq mi (0.61 km^{2})
  - Land: 0.24 sq mi (0.61 km^{2})
  - Water: 0 sq mi (0.00 km^{2})
- Elevation: 1,335 ft (407 m)

Population (2020)
  - Total: 209
  - Density: 889.5/sq mi (343.45/km^{2})
- Time zone: UTC-6 (Central (CST))
  - Summer (DST): UTC-5 (CDT)
- ZIP code: 50576
- Area code: 712
- FIPS code: 19-66360
- GNIS feature ID: 2396346

Rembrandt is a city in Buena Vista County, Iowa, United States. The population was 209 at the time of the 2020 census.

== Geography ==
According to the United States Census Bureau, the city has a total area of 0.20 square miles (0.52 km^{2}), all land.

== Demographics ==
Historical populations
Year	Pop.	±%
1910	128	—
1920	270	+110.9%
1930	263	−2.6%
1940	302	+14.8%
1950	296	−2.0%
1960	265	−10.5%
1970	250	−5.7%
1980	291	+16.4%
1990	229	−21.3%
2000	228	−0.4%
2010	203	−11.0%
2020	209	+3.0%
Source:"U.S. Census website". United States Census Bureau. and Iowa Data Center; Source: U.S. Decennial Census

=== 2020 census ===
As of the census of 2020, there were 209 people, 100 households, and 64 families residing in the city. The population density was 889.5 inhabitants per square mile (343.5/km^{2}). There were 100 housing units at an average density of 425.6 per square mile (164.3/km^{2}). The racial makeup of the city was 76.6% White, 1.0% Black or African American, 0.0% Native American, 0.0% Asian, 0.0% Pacific Islander, 15.8% from other races and 6.7% from two or more races. Hispanic or Latino persons of any race comprised 27.3% of the population.

Of the 100 households, 37.0% of which had children under the age of 18 living with them, 45.0% were married couples living together, 7.0% were cohabitating couples, 23.0% had a female householder with no spouse or partner present and 25.0% had a male householder with no spouse or partner present. 36.0% of all households were non-families. 34.0% of all households were made up of individuals, 15.0% had someone living alone who was 65 years old or older.

The median age in the city was 43.5 years. 27.3% of the residents were under the age of 20; 3.8% were between the ages of 20 and 24; 19.6% were from 25 and 44; 26.3% were from 45 and 64; and 23.0% were 65 years of age or older. The gender makeup of the city was 48.8% male and 51.2% female.

=== 2010 census ===
As of the census of 2010, there were 203 people, 89 households, and 53 families living in the city. The population density was 1,015.0 inhabitants per square mile (391.9/km^{2}). There were 99 housing units at an average density of 495.0 per square mile (191.1/km^{2}). The racial makeup of the city was 97.0% White, 0.5% African American, 1.5% from other races, and 1.0% from two or more races. Hispanic or Latino of any race were 3.9% of the population.

There were 89 households, of which 29.2% had children under the age of 18 living with them, 43.8% were married couples living together, 10.1% had a female householder with no husband present, 5.6% had a male householder with no wife present, and 40.4% were non-families. 37.1% of all households were made up of individuals, and 10.1% had someone living alone who was 65 years of age or older. The average household size was 2.28 and the average family size was 2.92.

The median age in the city was 37.8 years. 28.1% of residents were under the age of 18; 7.9% were between the ages of 18 and 24; 21.1% were from 25 to 44; 33% were from 45 to 64; and 9.9% were 65 years of age or older. The gender makeup of the city was 48.8% male and 51.2% female.

=== 2000 census ===
As of the census of 2000, there were 228 people, 96 households, and 59 families living in the city. The population density was 1,116.9 inhabitants per square mile (431.2/km^{2}). There were 102 housing units at an average density of 499.7 per square mile (192.9/km^{2}). The racial makeup of the city was 100.00% White.

There were 96 households, out of which 32.3% had children under the age of 18 living with them, 54.2% were married couples living together, 4.2% had a female householder with no husband present, and 38.5% were non-families. 36.5% of all households were made up of individuals, and 15.6% had someone living alone who was 65 years of age or older. The average household size was 2.38 and the average family size was 3.17.

Age spread: 28.5% under the age of 18, 9.6% from 18 to 24, 24.6% from 25 to 44, 21.5% from 45 to 64, and 15.8% who were 65 years of age or older. The median age was 37 years. For every 100 females, there were 94.9 males. For every 100 females age 18 and over, there were 94.0 males.

The median income for a household in the city was $34,375, and the median income for a family was $50,417. Males had a median income of $31,500 versus $17,500 for females. The per capita income for the city was $17,248. None of the families and 4.0% of the population were living below the poverty line, including no under eighteens and 7.4% of those over 64.

== Education ==
Sioux Central Community School District serves the community.

Rembrandt was part of the Rembrandt Consolidated School District until July 1, 1979, when it merged with the Sioux Rapids school district to form the Sioux Rapids-Rembrandt Community School District. At the time of the merger, Rembrandt was the smallest school district in the state of Iowa. On July 1, 1993, Sioux Rapids-Rembrandt consolidated with the Sioux Valley Community School District, forming the Sioux Central Community School District. Two years after the districts merged, Sioux Central voters narrowly approved a proposal to close the district's four aging buildings in Sioux Rapids, Linn Grove, Rembrandt, and Peterson, and to construct a new K-12 facility on a nearly 29-acre site along US Highway 71, just south of Sioux Rapids, or about 4 miles north of Rembrandt. The new school opened in 1997.
