= Marathon, Iowa =

- City
- Location of Marathon, Iowa
- Coordinates: 42°51′36″N 94°58′54″W
- Country: US
- State: Iowa
- County: Buena Vista
- Incorporated: October 31, 1892

Area
  - Total: 0.75 sq mi (1.94 km^{2})
  - Land: 0.75 sq mi (1.94 km^{2})
  - Water: 0 sq mi (0.00 km^{2})
- Elevation: 1,398 ft (426 m)

Population (2020)
  - Total: 230
  - Density: 306.9/sq mi (118.51/km^{2})
- Time zone: UTC-6 (Central (CST))
  - Summer (DST): UTC-5 (CDT)
- ZIP code: 50565
- Area code: 712
- FIPS code: 19-49260
- GNIS feature ID: 2395849

Marathon is a city in Buena Vista County, Iowa, United States. The population was 230 at the time of the 2020 census. The food writer Richard Olney grew up in Marathon.

From 1996 to 2017, every year in June, a marathon, half-marathon and 5k were held in the city. It was USA Track and Field certified and sanctioned, allowing participants to be eligible to qualify for the Boston Marathon.

== History ==
A post office called Marathon has been in operation since 1882. The name of the city commemorates the Battle of Marathon.

== Geography ==
According to the United States Census Bureau, the city has a total area of 0.74 square miles (1.92 km^{2}), all land.

== Demographics ==
Historical populations
Year	Pop.	±%
1900	659	—
1910	532	−19.3%
1920	520	−2.3%
1930	573	+10.2%
1940	597	+4.2%
1950	565	−5.4%
1960	516	−8.7%
1970	447	−13.4%
1980	442	−1.1%
1990	320	−27.6%
2000	302	−5.6%
2010	237	−21.5%
2020	230	−3.0%
Source:"U.S. Census website". United States Census Bureau. and Iowa Data Center; Source: U.S. Decennial Census

=== 2020 census ===
As of the census of 2020, there were 230 people, 113 households, and 65 families residing in the city. The population density was 306.9 inhabitants per square mile (118.5/km^{2}). There were 138 housing units at an average density of 184.2 per square mile (71.1/km^{2}). The racial makeup of the city was 91.7% White, 1.3% Black or African American, 0.0% Native American, 0.0% Asian, 0.0% Pacific Islander, 2.6% from other races and 4.3% from two or more races. Hispanic or Latino persons of any race comprised 9.1% of the population.

Of the 113 households, 27.4% of which had children under the age of 18 living with them, 35.4% were married couples living together, 15.9% were cohabitating couples, 23.0% had a female householder with no spouse or partner present and 25.7% had a male householder with no spouse or partner present. 42.5% of all households were non-families. 31.9% of all households were made up of individuals, 14.2% had someone living alone who was 65 years old or older.

The median age in the city was 47.1 years. 20.9% of the residents were under the age of 20; 2.2% were between the ages of 20 and 24; 23.9% were from 25 and 44; 33.5% were from 45 and 64; and 19.6% were 65 years of age or older. The gender makeup of the city was 52.2% male and 47.8% female.

=== 2010 census ===
At the 2010 census there were 237 people in 121 households, including 62 families, in the city. The population density was 320.3 inhabitants per square mile (123.7/km^{2}). There were 150 housing units at an average density of 202.7 per square mile (78.3/km^{2}). The racial makup of the city was 98.7% White, 0.4% from other races, and 0.8% from two or more races. Hispanic or Latino of any race were 2.5%.

Of the 121 households 17.4% had children under the age of 18 living with them, 43.8% were married couples living together, 3.3% had a female householder with no husband present, 4.1% had a male householder with no wife present, and 48.8% were non-families. 44.6% of households were one person and 21.5% were one person aged 65 or older. The average household size was 1.96 and the average family size was 2.69.

The median age was 49.5 years. 19.4% of residents were under the age of 18; 3% were between the ages of 18 and 24; 20.3% were from 25 to 44; 34.9% were from 45 to 64; and 22.4% were 65 or older. The gender makeup of the city was 51.5% male and 48.5% female.

=== 2000 census ===
At the 2000 census there were 302 people in 138 households, including 77 families, in the city. The population density was 412.7 inhabitants per square mile (159.3/km^{2}). There were 162 housing units at an average density of 221.4 per square mile (85.5/km^{2}). The racial makup of the city was 98.01% White, 0.33% Native American, 1.66% from other races. Hispanic or Latino of any race were 2.65%.

Of the 138 households 18.8% had children under the age of 18 living with them, 47.1% were married couples living together, 7.2% had a female householder with no husband present, and 44.2% were non-families. 38.4% of households were one person and 18.1% were one person aged 65 or older. The average household size was 2.19 and the average family size was 2.96.

The age distribution was 24.5% under the age of 18, 3.3% from 18 to 24, 24.2% from 25 to 44, 23.5% from 45 to 64, and 24.5% 65 or older. The median age was 44 years. For every 100 females, there were 100.0 males. For every 100 females age 18 and over, there were 94.9 males.

The median household income was $20,982 and the median family income was $26,042. Males had a median income of $23,750 versus $17,000 for females. The per capita income for the city was $12,751. About 19.0% of families and 22.5% of the population were below the poverty line, including 34.4% of those under the age of eighteen and 17.2% of those sixty five or over.

== Education ==
Marathon is within the Laurens–Marathon Community School District. It was a part of the Marathon Community School District until its consolidation into Laurens–Marathon on July 1, 1976. High school students from Laurens–Marathon have attended Pocahontas Area High School since 2017.
