= National Register of Historic Places listings in Buena Vista County, Iowa =

Location of Buena Vista County in Iowa

This is a list of the National Register of Historic Places listings in Buena Vista County, Iowa.

This is intended to be a complete list of the properties and districts on the National Register of Historic Places in Buena Vista County, Iowa, United States. Latitude and longitude coordinates are provided for many National Register properties and districts; these locations may be seen together in a map.

There are 11 properties and districts listed on the National Register in the county.

This National Park Service list is complete through NPS recent listings posted February 20, 2026.

== Current listings ==
	Name on the Register	Image	Date listed	Location	City or town	Description
1	Jesse J. and Mary F. Allee House	Jesse J. and Mary F. Allee House	March 26, 1992 (#92000271)	2020 640th St. 42°35′21″N 95°00′35″W	Newell	Historic home built in 1891.
2	Brooke Creek Bridge		June 25, 1998 (#98000754)	470th St. over Brooke Creek; 42°50′11″N 95°17′08″W	Sioux Rapids	
3	Chan-Ya-Ta Site	Chan-Ya-Ta Site	November 21, 1978 (#78001209)	Left bank of Brooke Creek, southwest of Linn Grove; 42°52′22″N 95°18′11″W	Linn Grove	
4	Chicago, Milwaukee and Pacific Railroad-Albert City Station	Chicago, Milwaukee and Pacific Railroad-Albert City Station	October 22, 1976 (#76000737)	212 N. 2nd St. 42°46′53″N 94°56′54″W	Albert City	
5	Danish Lutheran Church		November 18, 2011 (#11000814)	113 W. 4th St. 42°40′18″N 95°18′16″W	Alta	
6	Harker House	Harker House	December 6, 1990 (#90001855)	328 Lake Ave. 42°38′27″N 95°12′04″W	Storm Lake	Historic home built in 1875.
7	Illinois Central Passenger Depot-Storm Lake	Illinois Central Passenger Depot-Storm Lake	September 6, 1990 (#90001300)	South of W. Railroad St., between Lake and Michigan Aves. 42°38′35″N 95°12′06″W	Storm Lake	
8	Lewis "Lew" J. Metcalf Residence		February 23, 2026 (#100012735)	226 Geneseo Street; 42°38′21″N 95°12′13″W	Storm Lake	
9	Sioux Theatre		February 21, 2012 (#12000030)	218 Main St. 42°53′36″N 95°08′59″W	Sioux Rapids	Movie Theaters of Iowa Multiple Property Submission
10	Storm Lake High School		January 17, 2017 (#100000485)	310 Cayuga St. 42°38′24″N 95°11′55″W	Storm Lake	
11	Storm Lake Public Library	Storm Lake Public Library	May 23, 1983 (#83000346)	E. 5th and Erie Sts. 42°38′39″N 95°11′57″W	Storm Lake	Carnegie-funded library building (no longer used as public library).

== See also ==
- List of National Historic Landmarks in Iowa
- National Register of Historic Places listings in Iowa
- Listings in neighboring counties: Cherokee, Clay, Pocahontas, Sac
