= Danish Lutheran Church =

Danish Lutheran Church may refer to:

- Danish Lutheran Church (Alta, Iowa), listed on the National Register of Historic Places in Buena Vista County, Iowa
- Danish Lutheran Church (Manistee, Michigan), listed on the National Register of Historic Places in Manistee County, Michigan

== See also ==
- Church of Denmark, the established, state-supported church in Denmark
