= KKIA =

KKIA may refer to:

- Kenneth Kaunda International Airport, Lusaka, Zambia
- King Khalid International Airport, Riyadh, Saudi Arabia
- Kota Kinabalu International Airport, Sabah, Malaysia
- KKIA (FM), a radio station (92.9 FM) licensed to Ida Grove, Iowa, United States
