= KAYL (AM) =

- Storm Lake, Iowa, United States; United States
- Frequency: 990 (kHz)
- Branding: Juan

Programming
- Format: Regional Mexican

Ownership
- Owner: Community First Broadcasting

History
- First air date: November 14, 1948

Technical information
- Licensing authority: FCC
- Facility ID: 49744
- Class: D
- Power: 250 watts (daytime); 6 watts (nighttime)
- Transmitter coordinates: 42°38′5″N 95°10′10″W
- Translator: K260BS (99.9 FM)

Links
- Public license information: Public file; LMS
- Website: www.stormlakeradio.com

KAYL (990 AM, JUAN) is a radio station licensed to serve the community of Storm Lake, Iowa. The station broadcasts a Regional Mexican format in Spanish. KAYL has been owned by Community First Broadcasting since 2010.

== History ==
KAYL signed on November 14, 1948. It was owned by Cornbelt Broadcasting Company with the original shareholders of Oscar Grau, Joe Kevane, Paul Dlugosh, Dr. R.E. Mallard and Z.Z. White, operating on a daytime-only basis with 250 watts.

990 kHz is a clear-channel frequency assigned to CBW in Winnipeg, Canada, which resulted in KAYL being licensed as a daytime-only broadcaster to avoid interference. KAYL received its continuous power broadcast license in September 1992, enabling the station to remain on the air 24 hours a day with reduced power between sunset and sunrise.

The broadcast tower, located east of Storm Lake, collapsed on August 8, 1969, during a severe storm. The station was back on the air with a temporary antenna within about six hours.

In November 1997, KBVU-FM at Buena Vista University started broadcasting from the KAYL tower.
