= KKIA (FM) =

- Ida Grove, Iowa; United States
- Broadcast area: Storm Lake, Iowa
- Frequency: 92.9 MHz
- Branding: 92.9 KKIA - The Moose

Programming
- Format: Country
- Affiliations: Fox News Radio

Ownership
- Owner: Community First Broadcasting
- Sister stations: KAYL; KAYL-FM

History
- First air date: 1981
- Former call signs: KIDA (1981–1999)

Technical information
- Licensing authority: FCC
- Facility ID: 24517
- Class: C3
- ERP: 25,000 watts
- HAAT: 100 meters (330 ft)
- Transmitter coordinates: 42°29′23″N 95°17′40″W

Links
- Public license information: Public file; LMS
- Webcast: Listen live
- Website: www.stormlakeradio.com/newsite/index.php?stat=kkia

KKIA is an FM radio station in Storm Lake, Iowa, operating at 92.9 MHz with a power of 25,000 watts. The station's city of license is Ida Grove, Iowa, where it originally was KIDA. In 1999, the station was purchased by John Eisert. The studios were moved to Storm Lake and the call letters changed to KKIA. The country format continued, with the slogan "Wild Country--the Moose."

KKIA is now owned by Community First Broadcasting. It is located in Storm Lake with co-owned stations KAYL 990 AM and KAYL-FM 101.7.

KKIA "The Moose" broadcasts country music 24 hours a day, along with local news updates seven times a day, hourly market updates, and local sports play-by-play.
