= KBVU =

KBVU may refer to:

- KBVU (TV), a television station (channel 28) licensed to Eureka, California, United States (satellite station of KCVU channel 20 in Chico, California)
- KBVU-FM, a radio station (97.5 FM) licensed to Alta, Iowa, United States
- KBVU (AM), a defunct radio station (1540 AM) licensed to Bellevue, Washington in the 1960s.
- the ICAO code for Boulder City Municipal Airport
