= Heritage tree =

Individual tree with unique value

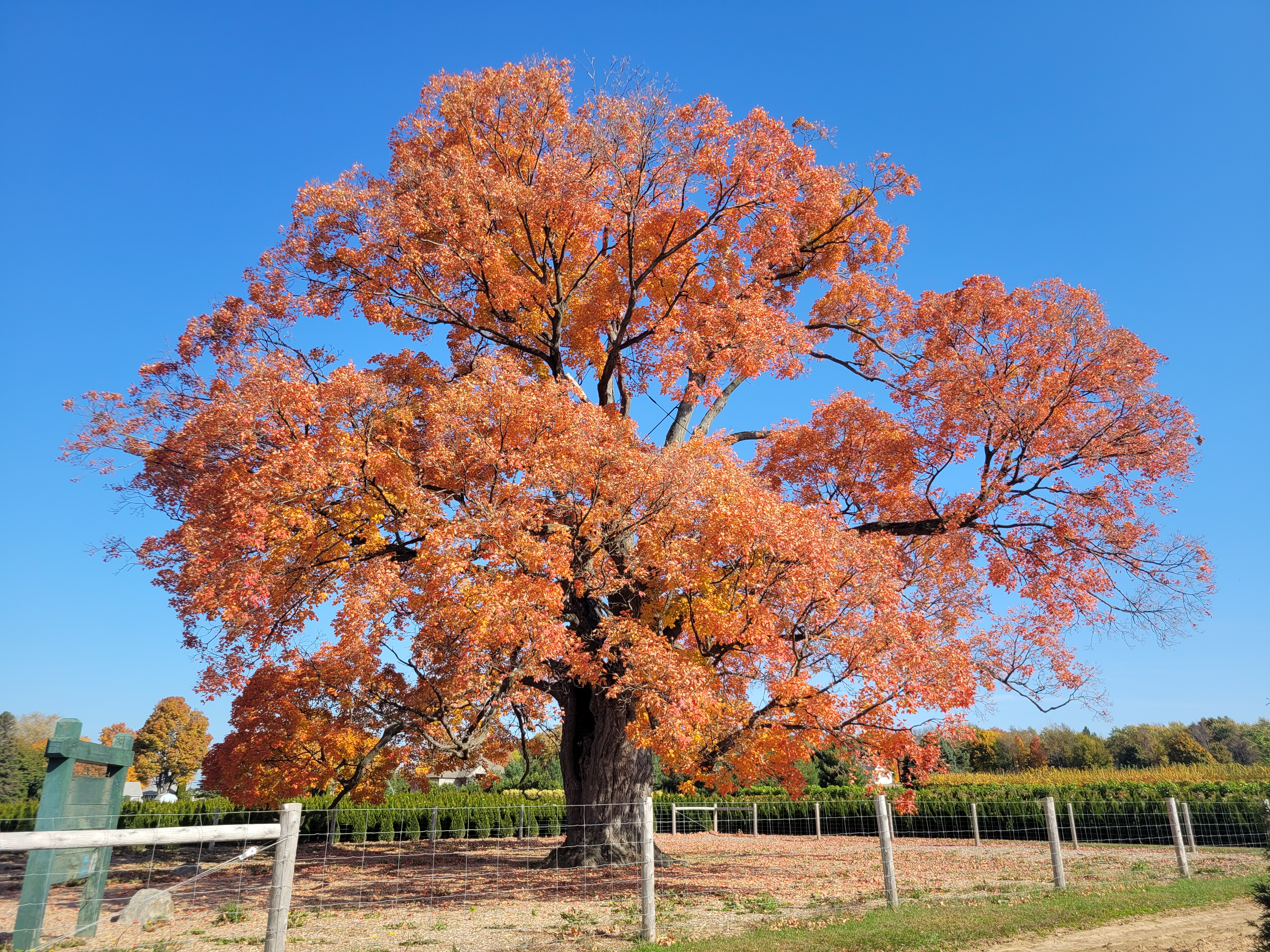
Comfort Maple, in Pelham, Ontario

A heritage tree is typically a large, individual tree with unique value, which is considered irreplaceable. The major criteria for heritage tree designation are age, rarity, and size, as well as aesthetic, botanical, ecological, and historical value. Heritage tree ordinances are developed to place limits upon the removal of these trees; the ordinances are oriented towards a specific tree, not a woodland. Heritage trees in Singapore are protected by law under the Heritage Trees Scheme adopted on 17 August 2001. The oak is depicted as England's heritage tree.

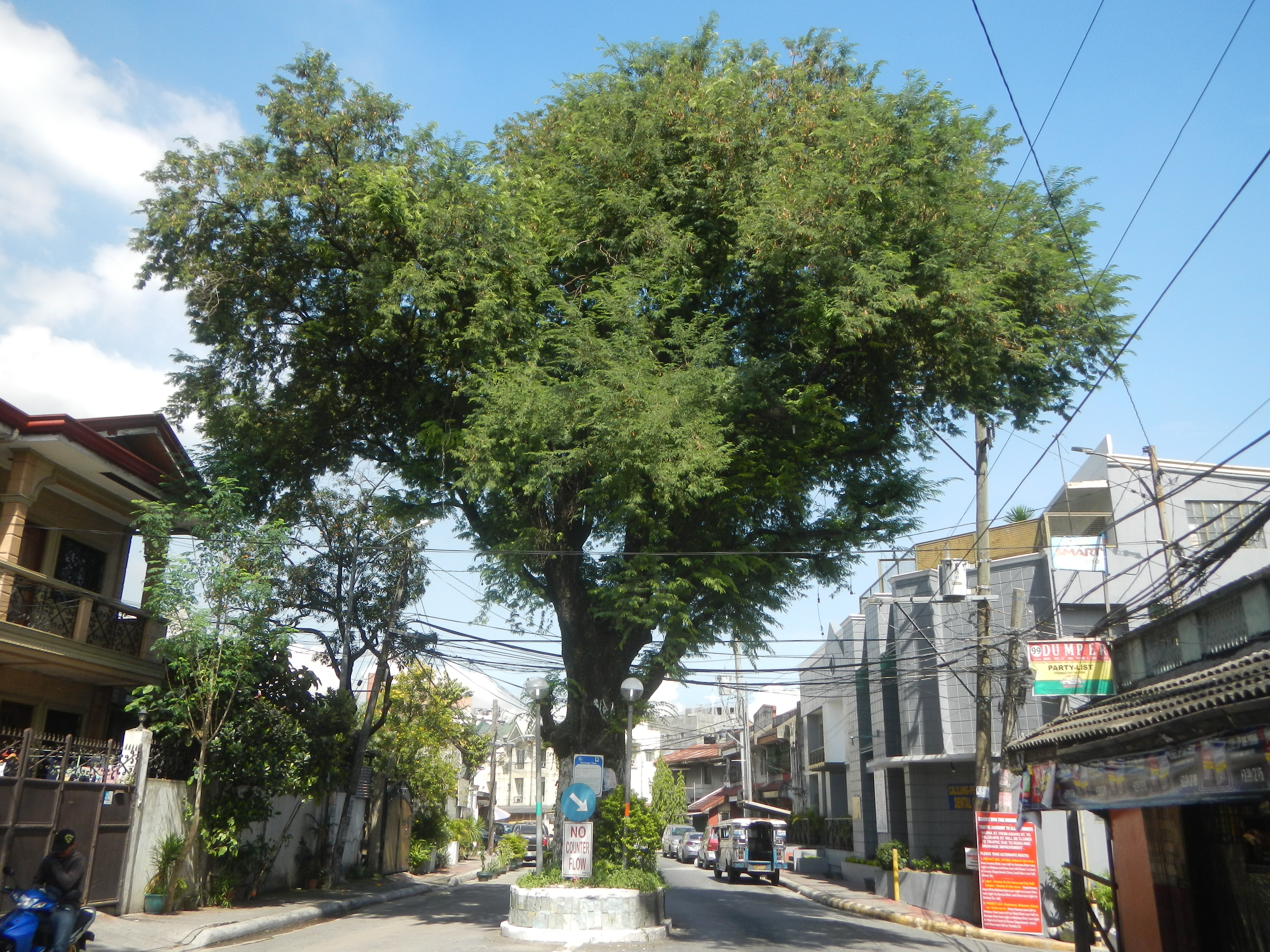
Heritage Tamarind, Quezon City

In the US, the first state-sponsored heritage tree program began in 1995 in Oregon with the Giant Sitka Spruce. In Iowa, the Living Heritage Tree Museum contains descendants of famous trees. In the state of Washington, there are several categories of heritage trees, such as Historical, Specimen, Rare, or Significant Grove.

The city of Portland, Oregon maintains a database of trees designated as heritage trees.

== Examples of heritage and named trees ==
- Ankerwycke Yew, Berkshire
- Bellmount Ancient Burry Oak, Belton Park, Lincolnshire
- The Royal Oak, Richmond Park
- Ancient Yew, St Helen's Church, Darley Dale, Derbyshire
- Linton Yew, Herefordshire
- Newton's Apple, Woolsthorpe Manor, Lincolnshire
- Fraternal Four, Borrowdale
- Waterloo Beech at Lowther

== Social and cultural significance ==
=== Incorporating the social and cultural significance of large ancient trees into conservation policies ===
Beyond their ecological functions, ancient trees are also considered to possess significant social and cultural value. Some studies indicate that ancient trees not only provide humanity with material resources such as timber and fruit, but also play important roles in religion, aesthetics, history, and local culture.

In many regions, ancient trees are closely associated with myths, legends, and traditional festivals, often seen as symbols of community memory and identity. For example, in Lao, Isan, and Turkic cultures, trees are depicted as world trees or cosmic connectors, linking heaven and earth with the underworld, symbolizing prosperity, protection, and ancestral memories.

Indian and Japanese traditions associate specific trees with the cycle of life, death, and reincarnation, while Slavic and Central Asian mythology emphasizes trees as sources of healing, creation, and protection.

Scholars suggest that when formulating policies and laws for the protection of heritage trees, these social and cultural values should be considered simultaneously in order to promote public participation and enhance the overall benefits of ecological protection.

=== Establish common standards for determining the status of ancient trees ===
Some researchers are attempting to establish common cross-regional standards for the identification of ancient trees. These standards are typically based on the historical, cultural, and natural characteristics of ancient trees to reflect their comprehensive value.

== Heritage tree preservation in the UK ==
=== Tree Preservation Order ===
The Town and Country Planning (Tree Preservation Order and Trees in Conservation Areas) (Scotland) Regulations 2010

Without prejudice to subsection (7) of section 198(1) (power to make tree preservation orders) or subsection (1) of section 200(2) (tree preservation orders: Forestry Commissioners) and, subject to the exceptions in regulation 14, no person shall—

a. cut down;

b. top;

c. lop;

d. uproot;

e. willfully damage; or

f. willfully destroy,

any tree to which an order relates, or shall cause or permit the carrying out of any of the activities in sub-paragraphs (a) to (f) to such a tree, except with the written consent of the authority and, where such consent is given subject to conditions, in accordance with those conditions.

=== Relevant laws ===
The law on Tree Preservation Orders is in Part VIII of the Town and Country Planning Act 1990 as amended and in the Town and Country Planning (Tree Preservation) (England) Regulations 2012 which came into force on 6 April 2012. Section 192 of the Planning Act 2008 made further amendments to the 1990 Act which allowed for the transfer of provisions from within existing Tree Preservation Orders to regulations. Part 6 of the Localism Act 2011 amended section 210 of the Town and Country Planning Act 1990 concerning time limits for proceedings in regard to non-compliance with Tree Preservation Order regulations.
