= Storm Lake Municipal Airport =

- IATA: SLB; ICAO: KSLB; FAA LID: SLB

Summary
- Airport type: Public
- Owner: City of Storm Lake
- Location: Storm Lake, Iowa
- Elevation AMSL: 1,488 ft / 454 m
- Coordinates: 42°35′50″N 95°14′26.4″W
- Website: http://www.stormlake.org/index.aspx?NID=16

Map
- Location of airport in Iowa/United States SLB (the United States)

Runways
Direction	Length		Surface
Direction	ft	m	Surface
06/24	1,962	598	Turf
13/31	3,035	925	Concrete
17/35	5,002	1,525	Concrete

Statistics (2009)
- Aircraft operations: 19,600
- Based aircraft: 37
- Source: Federal Aviation Administration

Storm Lake Municipal Airport (IATA: SLB, ICAO: KSLB, FAA LID: SLB) is a city-owned public-use airport located in Storm Lake, Iowa, United States. The airport is mostly used for general aviation.

== Facilities and aircraft ==
Storm Lake Municipal Airport covers an area of 160 acres (65 ha) and contains one turf runway (06/24: 1,962 x 95 ft) and two concrete runways (13/31: 3,035 x 50 ft and 17/35: 5,002 x 75 ft). For the 12-month period ending May 7, 2009, the airport had 19,600 aircraft operations for an average of 54 per day. There are 37 aircraft based at this airport: 36 single-engine and 1 jet.

== See also ==
- List of airports in Iowa
