= Buena Vista County Courthouse (Iowa) =

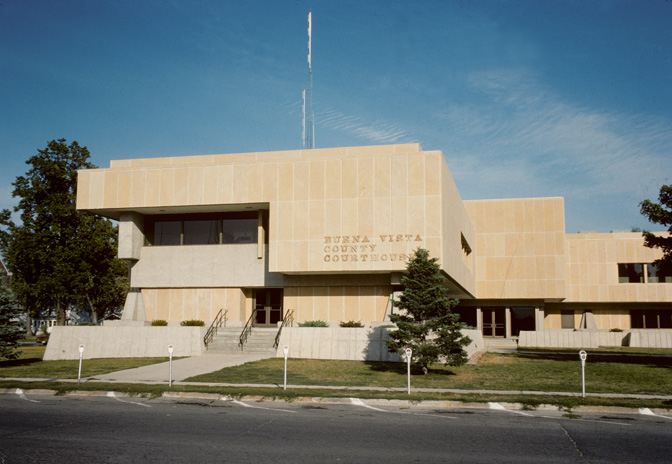
- Buena Vista County Courthouse

General information
- Type: Courthouse
- Architectural style: Modern
- Location: 215 E. 5th St., Storm Lake, Iowa, United States
- Coordinates: 42.644935°N 95.199026°W
- Construction started: 1969
- Completed: 1972

Technical details
- Floor count: Two

The Buena Vista County Courthouse is located at 215 East 5th Street in Storm Lake, Iowa, United States. Built in 1972, it is the fourth building dedicated to house court functions and county administration.

== History ==
In the early years of Buena Vista County there was no courthouse. After it was established in 1851 and until 1856 it relied on Woodbury County for voting and judicial functions. The first county seat was the town of Prairieville, but it never entirely developed as a community. Court sessions after the county was organized in 1858 were held in private homes and storerooms. The first courthouse was built in Sioux Rapids in 1870. The two-story structure was completed for $4,945. Just after the courthouse was completed, Alta, Newell, and Storm Lake started to vie for the county seat. The railroad had just begun serving the communities and they were starting to expand. Newell even had a brick building constructed for a courthouse. The courthouse in Sioux Rapids was destroyed in a fire on January 1, 1877. A safe and the records of the county board of supervisors was all that survived. Court sessions were moved to a schoolhouse. Storm Lake offered the use of its recently completed city hall for use as a courthouse for ten years if the county agreed to make it the county seat. The offer was accepted in 1878 and local residents went to Sioux Rapids to retrieve the county records. A 2½-story, brick, Vernacular Romanesque courthouse was built in 1888 for $25,000. Sac County used it as a model for their courthouse a year later.

The current Buena Vista County Courthouse was begun in 1969 and it was dedicated in May 1972. The Modern movement building was completed at a cost of $1.2 million. The structure is in the shape of an "L" with two wings that mirror each other. It features a courtroom in the round that measures 30 feet (9.1 m) in diameter.
