= The Messiah (novel) =

- Author: Marjorie Holmes
- Language: English
- Genre: Christian novels
- Publisher: Harper & Row
- Publication date: 1987
- Publication place: United States and Canada
- English publication date: 1987
- Preceded by: Three from Galilee

The Messiah is the third novel in a trilogy by Marjorie Holmes based on the life of Jesus Christ. The story continues where Three from Galilee left off, with Jesus ready to begin his earthly ministry as the Messiah. The book was published in 1987.

The trilogy was highly popular.
