= Storm Lake station =

- Illinois Central Passenger Depot-Storm Lake
- U.S. National Register of Historic Places
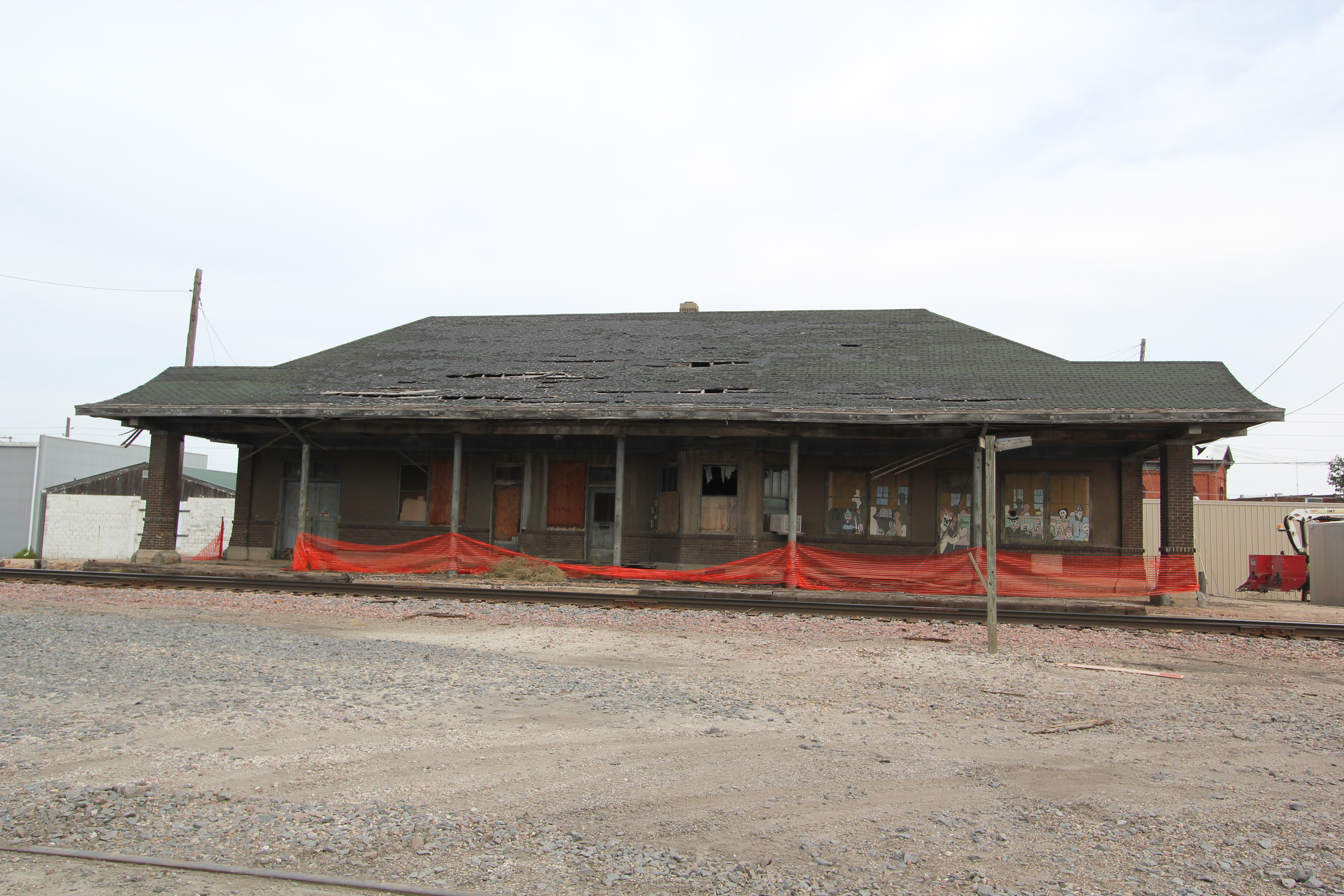

- Location within Iowa Location within the United States
- Location: South of W. Railroad St., between Lake and Michigan Aves., Storm Lake, Iowa
- Coordinates: 42°38′35″N 95°12′06″W
- Built: 1915
- Architect: E.E. Bihl
- Architectural style: Prairie School; Tudor Revival
- MPS: Advent & Development of Railroads in Iowa MPS
- NRHP reference No.: 90001300
- Added to NRHP: September 6, 1990

Storm Lake station was a former building located in Storm Lake, Iowa, United States. The Iowa Falls & Sioux City Railroad, an Illinois Central Railroad (IC) subsidiary, built the first tracks through town in 1870. They also built a two-story frame combination freight and passenger depot the same year. The present depot is a second generation IC structure built of brick. The building's architectural style is Prairie School with Tudor Revival elements in the dormer and canopy ends. It was designed by IC architect E.E. Bihl, and it is similar to the railroad's depots in Flossmoor, Illinois and Fort Dodge, Iowa. The new passenger depot was completed in August, 1915, and the old depot was re-purposed for a dedicated freight depot. It was torn down sometime before 1948. Passenger service remained high during the 1910s and 1920s, with the decline accelerating after World War II, and it ended all together in the late 1960s. While freight trains continue to use the IC's tracks, the depot has been abandoned. It was listed on the National Register of Historic Places in 1990. The Storm Lake Illinois Central depot was demolished on February 25, 2013.

Preceding station	Illinois Central Railroad	Following station
Alta toward Sioux City	Sioux City – Chicago	Sulfur Springs toward Chicago
