= Comfort Maple =

Old sugar maple tree in Pelham, Ontario, Canada

Coordinates: 43.059117°N 79.345263°W

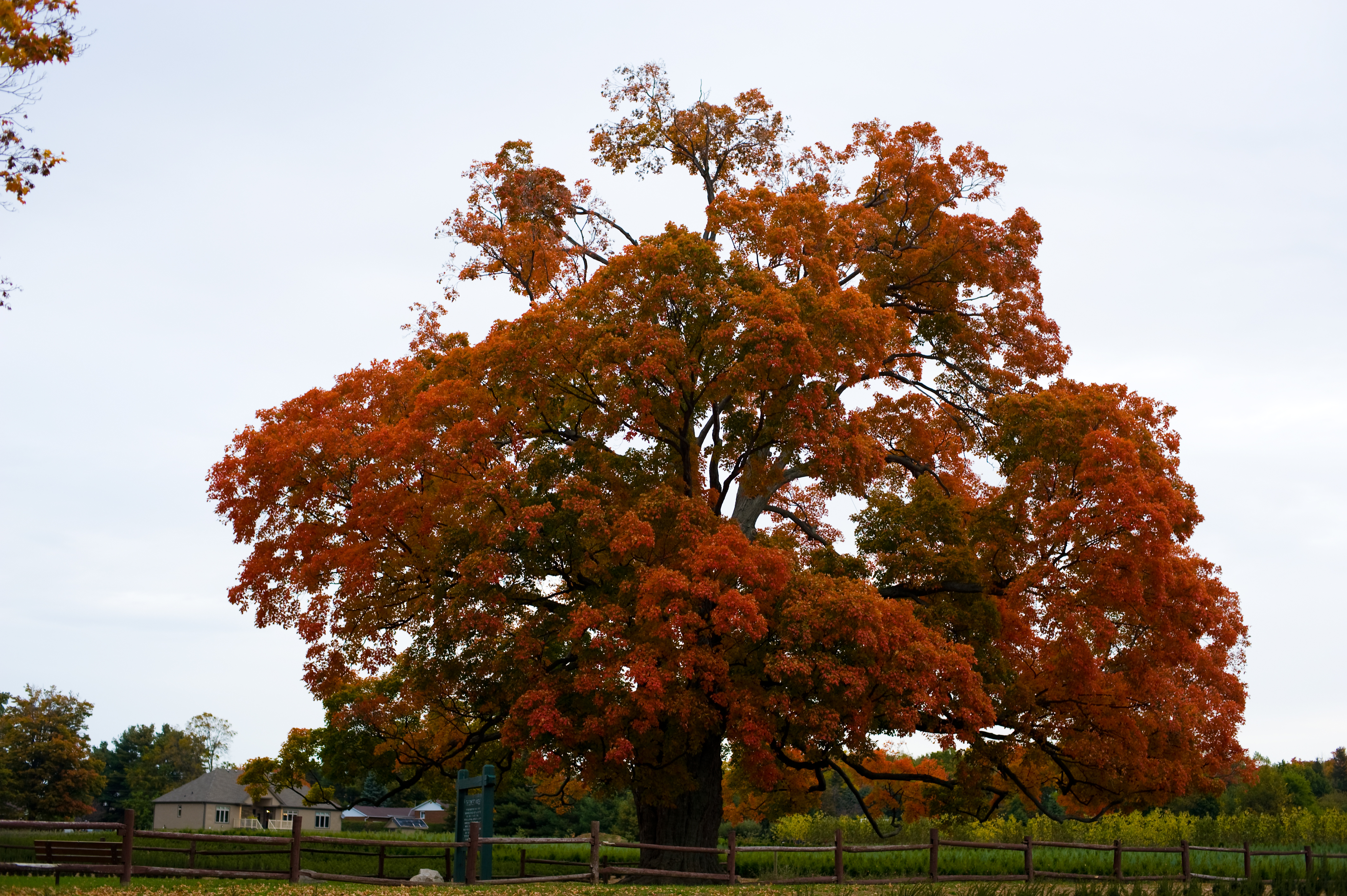
The Comfort Maple Tree, Pelham, Ontario

The Comfort Maple tree is an individual sugar maple (Acer saccharum) located in Comfort Maple Conservation Area in the town of Pelham, Ontario. The tree is estimated (not based upon a complete ring count) to be about 500 years old. If correct, it would make this one of the oldest sugar maple trees in Canada.

The tree is named for the Comfort family, who acquired the land in 1816. A township map from later in the 19th century shows the land owned by John B. Comfort, and a sign at the site tells visitors that the tree and the land around it were donated to the Niagara Peninsula Conservation Authority on April 30, 1961 by Miss Edna Eleanor Comfort. The current owner of the Comfort Maple is Dr. Paul Coyne.

The tree is 24.5 metres (80 ft) tall with a crown that is 38 metres (125 ft) in circumference with the trunk itself measured at 6 metres (20 ft) in circumference at the base. Due to the rigors of age as well as at least one major lightning strike, the tree has been repaired over the years with bricks, concrete, and guy wires. The conservation area is located at the end of a narrow lane off Metler Road. (Niagara Regional Rd. 28) near North Pelham. It is surrounded by farm land. It is just 0.1 hectares (0.25 acres) and has a small parking area. The Comfort Maple was designated a heritage tree in June 2000 under the Ontario Heritage Act (OHA). (7)

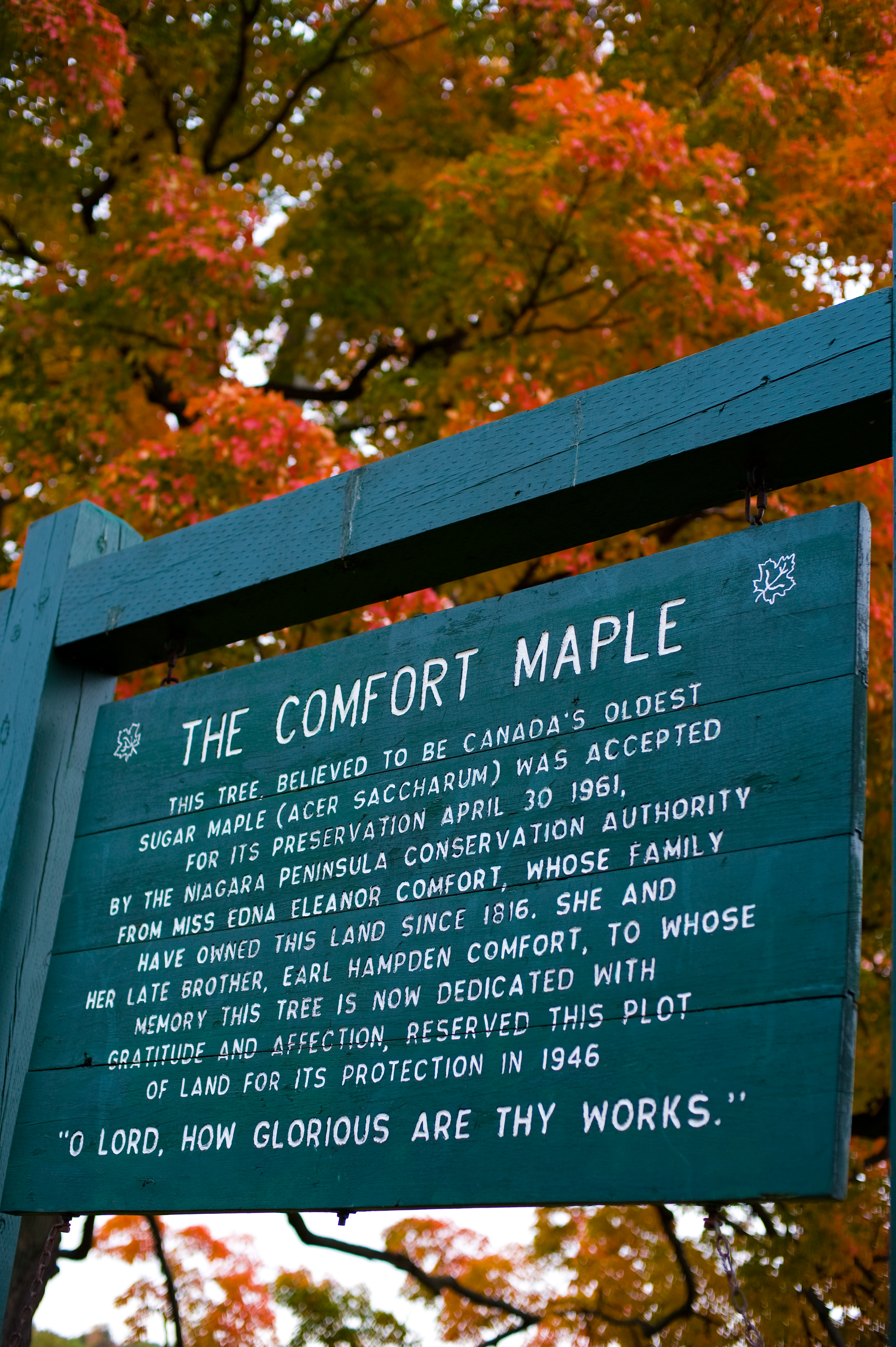
Interpretive sign

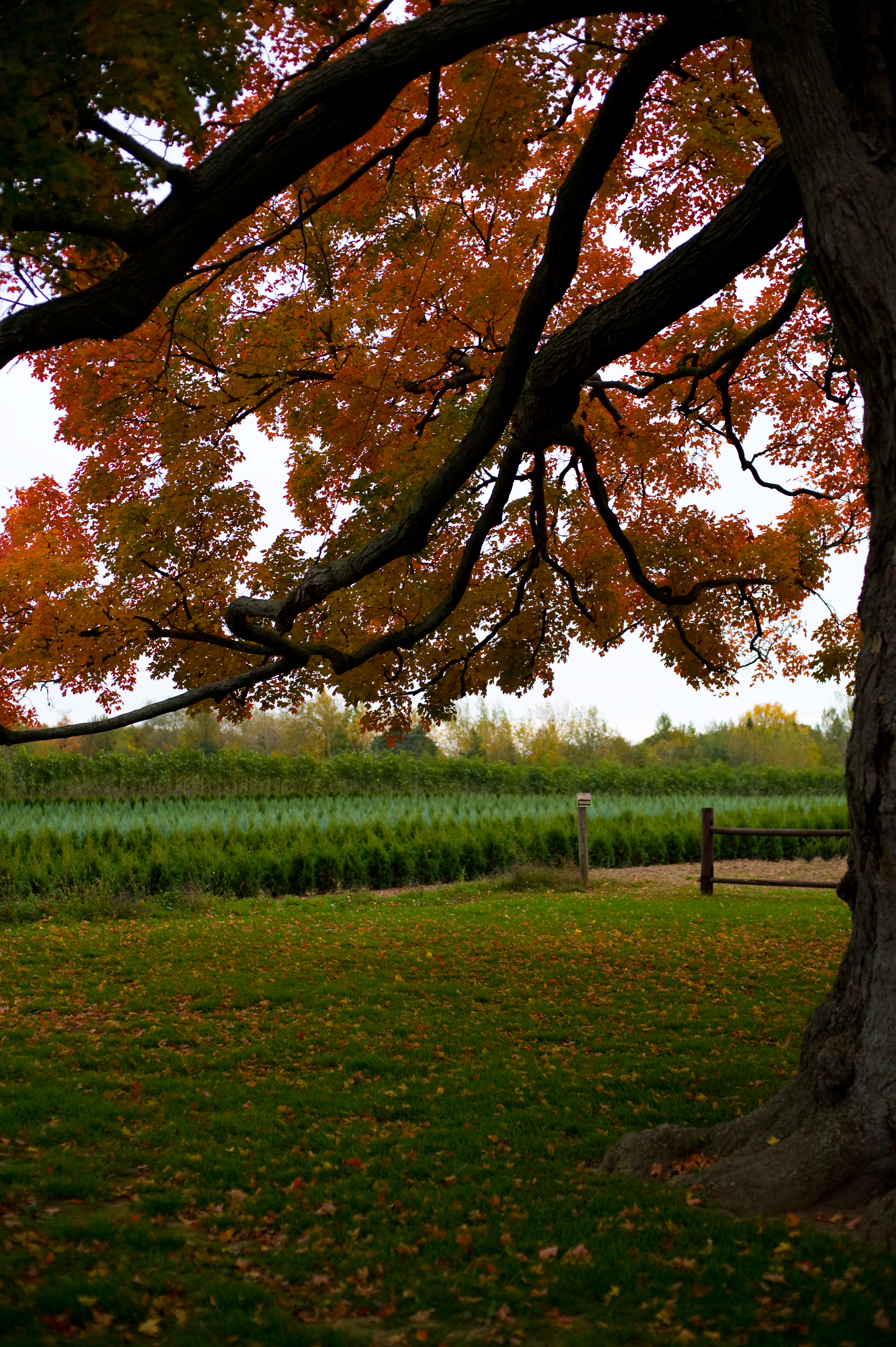
Wires were installed to support the branches of the tree

== See also ==
- List of individual trees
- List of oldest trees
