= Three from Galilee =

Second novel in a trilogy by Marjorie Holmes

- Author: Marjorie Holmes
- Language: English
- Genre: Christian novels
- Publisher: Bantam Books
- Publication date: 1985
- Publication place: United States and Canada
- Preceded by: Two from Galilee
- Followed by: The Messiah

Three From Galilee is the second novel in a trilogy by Marjorie Holmes based on the life of Jesus Christ. It begins three years after the birth of Jesus in Two from Galilee and continues through the start of his earthly ministry at age 30. The book was published in 1985.

The trilogy was highly popular.
