= Living Heritage Tree Museum =

Museum in Iowa

Coordinates: 42.638°N 95.206°W

The Living Heritage Tree Museum is located in the city of Storm Lake, Iowa, United States. It is an open-air museum dedicated to heritage trees, situated in Sunset Park on West Lake Shore Drive. It was founded by Stan Lemaster and Theodore Klein. The museum collection includes descendants of trees with historical connections to Joan of Arc, Johnny Appleseed, and Henry Wadsworth Longfellow.

== Description ==
The Living Heritage Tree Museum contains the following trees:

- Alex Haley Silver Maple: Grown from a seed from the home of Alex Haley's grandparents.
- American Sycamore Moon Tree: Grown from a Sycamore seed carried in Apollo 14's Command Module by Stuart Roosa, which circled the Moon 34 times before returning to Earth.
- Ann Rutledge Maple: Descended from a tree that shades Ann Rutledge's grave.
- Basking Ridge Oak: The parent of this tree is nearly 400 years old.
- Buffalo Bill Cottonwood: Seed taken from Klein Nursery.
- Bunker Hill Oak: Descended from a tree on the famous Bunker Hill.
- Charter Oak: Taken from Hartford, Connecticut.
- Chuck Yeager Butternut: Seedling taken from a tree from Chuck Yeager's childhood home.
- Colonel Sanders Ash: From Sanders' home in Kentucky.
- General Ben Butler Maple: From Butler's home in Kentucky.
- General Sherman Maple: From Fort Duffield, near West Point Academy.
- George Rogers Clark Kentucky Coffee Tree: Descended of the Kentucky state tree.
- George Washington Sycamore: Descended from the tree that stood near George Washington's headquarters during the Battle of White Plains.
- George Washington Walnut Tree: Descended from the tree visited by Washington after the Battle of Springfield.
- Harriet Beecher Stowe Ash Tree: Seedling taken from the home of Harriet Beecher Stowe.
- Henry Clay Ginko Tree: From a tree planted by Henry Clay Ginko.
- Isaac Newton Apple: Descended from the apple tree that inspired Isaac Newton to formulate the theory of gravity.
- James Whitcomb Riley Maple: From the home of James Whitcomb Riley.
- Jefferson, Iowa Council Oak Tree: Seed taken from the only tree in Jefferson, Iowa in 1854.
- Johnny Appleseed Apple Tree: From an original tree planted by Johnny Appleseed.
- Lincoln White Oak: From an Oak in Albion Illinois.
- Lindbergh Crab Apple: From the home of Charles A. Lindbergh.
- Little House Cottonwood: Seed taken from the homestead of Charles Ingalls.
- Ming Dynasty Cypress: From a Ming pagoda garden.
- Olympic German Pin Oak: From a tree given as a gift during the 1936 Olympics
- Original Delicious Apple: From the first tree to grow delicious apples.
- Peter Gideon Original Wealthy Apple: Developed by Peter Gideon to withstand the cold.
- Rockefeller Oak: Descended from the "Great White Oak" in Williamsburg, Virginia.
- Sargent Alvin York Linden Tree: Seeds taken from York's farm at Pell Mall, Tennessee.
- Society of Separatists Zoar Apple Tree: From an apple tree brought to America from Germany in 1817.
- Sugar Maple From the Sacred Grove: The parent of this tree is over 200 years old.
- Theodore Klein Flowering Crab: Dedicated to Theodore Klein and Stan Lemaster, founders of the Living Heritage Tree Museum.
- Ulysses S. Grant Gum: From the birthplace of Ulysses S. Grant.
- Ulysses S. Grant Maple: From the birthplace of Ulysses S. Grant.
- Versailles Chestnut: From the site where the treaty to end World War I was signed.
- Village Blacksmith Chestnut: Descended from the tree mentioned in "Under the Spreading Chestnut Tree."
- Wright Brothers Walnut: Grown from a walnut the Wright Brothers planted on the location of their first flight.
- Wye Oak: From the largest Wye Oak in the United States.
- Zollie Oak Tree: Descended from an oak that marks a mass grave of Confederate soldiers.

== See also ==
- List of individual trees
