= Marjorie Holmes =

American columnist and author

Holmes in 1971

Marjorie Holmes (1910–2002) was an American columnist and best-selling Christian author of 134 books, 32 of which were best sellers. Holmes is known best for her biblical trilogy which began with the novel Two From Galilee, a love story about Mary and Joseph, published by Fleming H. Revell.

== Biography ==
Born in 1910 in Storm Lake, Iowa, to tractor salesman Sam Holmes and his wife, Marjorie Holmes began writing as a teenager, selling her first story during the Great Depression before graduating from Cornell College in 1931. She met engineering student Lynn Mighell (pronounced mile), a native of Holstein, at a writers' workshop at the University of Iowa. They married in 1932, living first in McLean then Manassas, Virginia, and had four children, including a daughter named Melanie.

Holmes also wrote a twice-weekly syndicated family-life column, "Love and Laughter," for the Washington Evening Star newspaper from 1959 to 1973. She also wrote the monthly "A Woman's Conversations With God" column from 1970 to 1975. She wrote articles in magazines such as Woman's Day, McCall's, Ladies Home Journal, Reader's Digest, Better Homes and Gardens, Today's Health and Daily Guidepost. She also taught university level writing courses.

Her first novel, World By the Tail, was published in 1943. She attracted a loyal audience with her commonsense parables and pick-me-ups published in such volumes as Hold Me up a Little Longer, Lord and Secrets of Health, Energy, and Staying Young, an ode to the miraculous properties of nutritional supplements.

== Two From Galilee trilogy ==
From 1972 to 1987, Holmes published a trilogy of controversial novels based on the life of Jesus, beginning with Two from Galilee. Her inspiration came from a candlelit Christmas Eve church service in 1963 which featured a nativity scene. Sitting beside her thirteen-year-old daughter, near the hay, Holmes felt transported back to "the fields and barns" of her Iowa childhood. In the introduction of the book, she wrote:

For the first time in my life, I realised, "Why, this really happened!" On this night, a long time ago, there actually was a girl having a baby far from home...in a manger, on the hay...and I thought, astonished: "When Mary bore the Christ child, she couldn't have been much older than my Melanie here beside me!" With this sudden awareness came a thrilling conviction about Joseph: He must have been a young man too. Old enough to protect and care for Mary and her child, but young enough to be deeply in love with her. And she with him. Why not? They were engaged to be married. Surely a God, who loved us enough to send his precious son into the world, would want that son to be raised in a home where there was love—genuine human love between his earthly parents.

Holmes spent the next three years researching and writing the story. With the help of Hebrew-speaking Dr. Roy Blizzard, she travelled to Israel and worked on archaeological excavations throughout. Once Two from Galilee was completed, it was rejected by many publishers over a six-year period before finally being released by Bantam Books in 1972.

Two sequels followed, Three From Galilee and The Messiah. Two From Galilee was later adapted into a musical by Robert Sterling and Karla Worley.

== Personal life ==
Holmes' husband Lynn Mighell worked as an executive for Carrier Global. He died of cancer in 1979, after years of illness. While grieving his loss, Holmes wrote To Help You Through the Hurting which was published in 1983.

In 1981, physician George Schmieler contacted Holmes after reading I've Got to Talk to Somebody, God and tracing her unlisted phone number through relatives. Schmieler's wife had just died and he had read the book after discovering it amongst his former wife's possessions. When she answered the call, he said, "I love you. You saved my life." They were married less than five months later and moved to Pittsburgh, where they lived until his death in 1992. Their relationship was the basis for her 1993 book Second Wife, Second Life.

Holmes returned to the Washington D.C. area in her final years. After suffering a series of strokes, she died at a nursing home in Manassas on March 13, 2002.
