= Tree conservation areas in Singapore =

Areas where trees are protected

Tree conservation areas are large urban areas in Singapore in which no tree with a girth above 1 metre when measured 50 centimetres from the ground may be felled without permission from the National Parks Board.

There are currently two such areas, Central TCA (South Central of Singapore) and Changi TCA (Eastern Parts of Singapore).

== Illegal felling of a Hopea sangal tree ==
On 20 November 2002, a large tree was chopped down by a property management company, DTZ Debenham Tie Leung. The tree in question was a Hopea sangal, or Chengal pasir tree, a rare tree reputed to have given Changi its name. In addition, the tree was standing in a tree conservation area, which forbids any unauthorised felling of a tree with a girth above 1 metre. The tree in question had a girth of 3.4 metres.

Public sentiment against the felling was high, and the courts imposed a S$8,000 fine on the company for the offence, which has a maximum fine of S$10,000. The company was also ordered to pay S$76,035 to the state in compensation for the felling.

Nature groups and concerned citizens were determined to ensure that this episode became a lesson to be learnt for others. In September 2003, the logs which has been cut down were recovered and transformed into sculptures. A major educational drive, called "The Hopea sangal Tree: Sculpture Symposium", was organised by The Sculpture Society (Singapore) in partnership with the National Parks Board and the Nanyang Academy of Fine Arts, and with the support of the Nature Society (Singapore) and the Urban Redevelopment Authority, representing a government-NGO combined effort to raise awareness towards the conservation of trees.

Seeds recovered in September 2002 were grown in National Parks Board's Pasir Panjang Nursery. On 7 November 2004, Minister Mentor Lee Kuan Yew planted a sapling in Hendersonville (between blocks 103 and 104), Henderson Crescent.
