= Harker House (Storm Lake, Iowa) =

Historic house in Iowa, United States

- U.S. National Register of Historic Places
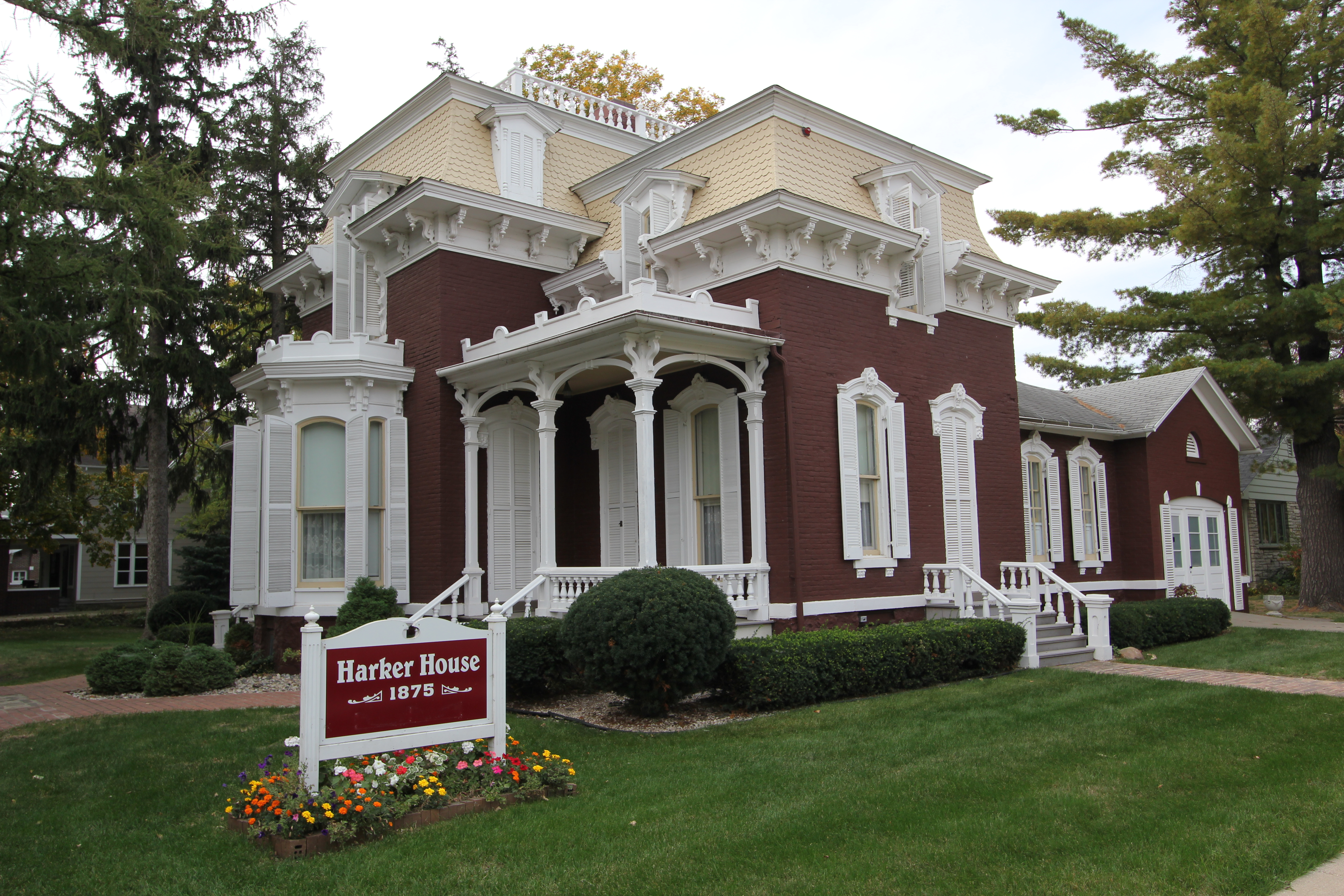

- Location within Iowa Location within the United States
- Location: 328 Lake Ave. Storm Lake, Iowa
- Coordinates: 42°38′26″N 95°12′04″W
- Area: less than one acre
- Built: 1875
- Built by: J.M. Russell
- Architect: James Harker (attributed)
- Architectural style: Second Empire
- NRHP reference No.: 90001855
- Added to NRHP: December 6, 1990

The Harker House is a historic building located in Storm Lake, Iowa, United States. This two-story Second Empire house is attributed to Fort Dodge, Iowa architect James Harker. It is the only local house remaining in this style that has not been torn down or substantially altered. Featuring mansard roofs with dormer windows, a mansarded tower, bracketed cornice, hooded windows and doors, projecting bays, and highly decorative single-story porches, it is a textbook example of the Second Empire style. It was built in 1875 of locally produced brick. The house was listed on the National Register of Historic Places in 1990.
