= KBVU-FM =

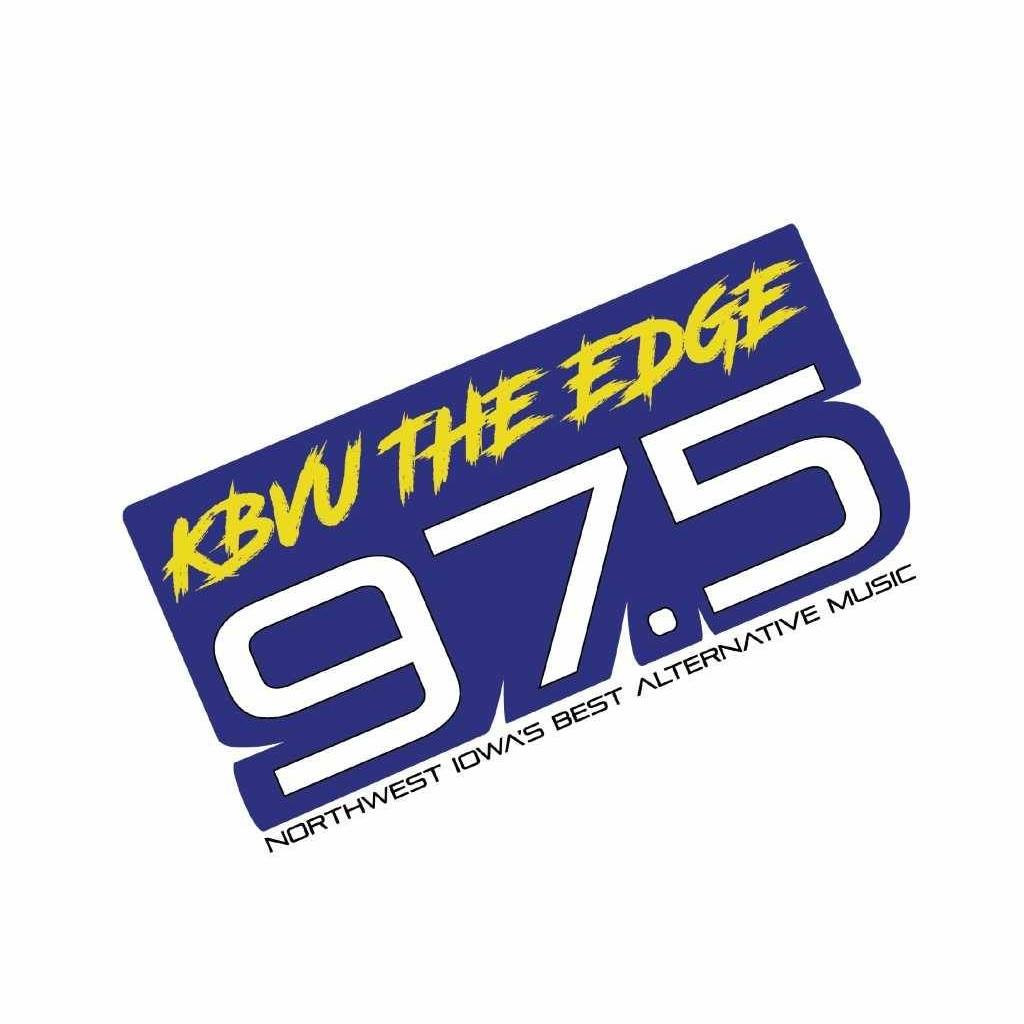
- Alta, Iowa/Storm Lake, Iowa; United States
- Frequency: 97.5 MHz
- Branding: The Edge

Programming
- Format: Alternative rock

Ownership
- Owner: Buena Vista University

History
- First air date: November 1997
- Call sign meaning: Buena Vista University

Technical information
- Licensing authority: FCC
- Class: A
- ERP: 6,000 watts
- HAAT: 96 metres (315 ft)
- Transmitter coordinates: 42°38′5″N 95°10′10″W

Links
- Public license information: Public file; LMS
- Webcast: Listen live
- Website: www.kbvu975.com

KBVU-FM (97.5 FM, "The Edge") is a commercial radio station licensed to serve the community of Alta, Iowa. KBVU-FM is owned by Buena Vista University and broadcasts from there as well in Storm Lake. KBVU broadcasts an alternative rock format.

In November 1997, KBVU-FM started broadcasting from the KAYL tower located on the east side of Storm Lake.

== See also ==
- Campus radio
- List of college radio stations in the United States
