= Two from Galilee =

1972 novel by Marjorie Holmes

Two From Galilee
- Author: Marjorie Holmes
- Language: English
- Genre: Christian novels
- Publisher: Bantam Books (published by arrangement with Fleming H. Revell Company)
- Publication date: 1972
- Publication place: United States and Canada
- Followed by: Three from Galilee

Two From Galilee is the first novel in a trilogy by Marjorie Holmes based on the life of Jesus Christ. The book was published in 1972.

== Plot ==
The story begins with the discovery that teenager Mary has become a woman, ready to be betrothed. Wealthy and handsome Cleophas and rabbi's son Abner are both in love with Mary but she loves only Joseph, the son of a carpenter. Despite their age difference and the objections of Mary's mother, Hannah, the love between Mary and Joseph prevails, and they are betrothed.

Soon after the ceremony, Mary is visited by an angel, who tells her that she will become the mother of the Messiah, whom she shall name Jesus. Mary is then faced with the responsibility of impending motherhood as well as proving to Joseph that she has not betrayed him.

Meanwhile, Mary's aunt Elizabeth is also pregnant (with John the Baptist). After telling her parents and Joseph the truth, Mary's family arranges for her to come to Jerusalem to stay with Zechariah and Elizabeth temporarily. Joseph remains behind in Galilee, tormented by jealousy, until an angel visits him. Joseph's father Jacob dies and, afterwards, Joseph goes to Mary as the angel instructed. After they are married, Joseph takes Mary with him to Bethlehem, where taxes must be paid. Unable to find other accommodations, they stay in a stable, where Mary gives birth to Jesus. They are visited by wise men who bring gifts to the newborn Messiah. The wise men originally came on behalf of King Herod, who has ordered the execution of all male babies in Jerusalem to prevent the Messiah from coming to power. The wise men are warned to flee from Herod and Joseph is warned to flee to Egypt with Mary and Jesus. The book ends with them on the journey to Egypt.

== Reception ==
Literary critics were unimpressed, such as David Streitfeld, writing in the Washington Post Book World: "Marjorie Holmes' Two From Galilee, although no doubt deeply felt, is awkward enough to be cited in bad-writing seminars."

However, millions of copies were sold, placing the book in the top 10 best-selling novels of 1972.

Robert Sterling and Karla Worley wrote a musical Two from Galilee based on the book, which has been performed in various churches.
