= Old Storm Lake High School =

- Storm Lake High School
- U.S. National Register of Historic Places
- Location within Iowa Location within the United States
- Location: 310 Cayuga St. Storm Lake, Iowa
- Coordinates: 42°38′24″N 95°11′55″W
- Area: 2.3 acres (0.93 ha)
- Built: 1929
- Built by: Tom Park
- Architect: Keffer and Jones
- Architectural style: Tudor Revival
- NRHP reference No.: 100000485
- Added to NRHP: January 17, 2017

Old Storm Lake High School, also known as Storm Lake High School, Storm Lake Junior High School, South Elementary School, and South School, is a historic building located in Storm Lake, Iowa, United States. It is significant for its subdued Tudor Revival architecture and its association with the Des Moines architectural firm of Keffer and Jones. It was listed on the National Register of Historic Places in 2017.

The first school in Storm Lake was completed in 1869 on the same site as this building. It was replaced in 1874 by a larger high school building on the same site. Additions to that building were made over the years until it was torn down and replaced with a new three-story brick building in 1914. That building soon became inadequate and a wood-frame structure was built behind it to house grades 7–9. The wooden building was much maligned and a study was undertaken by the school district to determine what to do. It was decided to build a new high school on the same site and it was completed in 1929. Local contractor Tom Park was responsible for its construction. In addition to its use as a school, the gymnasium and auditorium were used for other community functions.

The building housed the high school from 1929 to 1962 when a new high school was completed. It was then used as a junior high/middle school from 1962 to 1992 when, again, a new building was completed. The building was then used as an elementary school until 2009.
