= Storm Lake Public Library =

- U.S. National Register of Historic Places
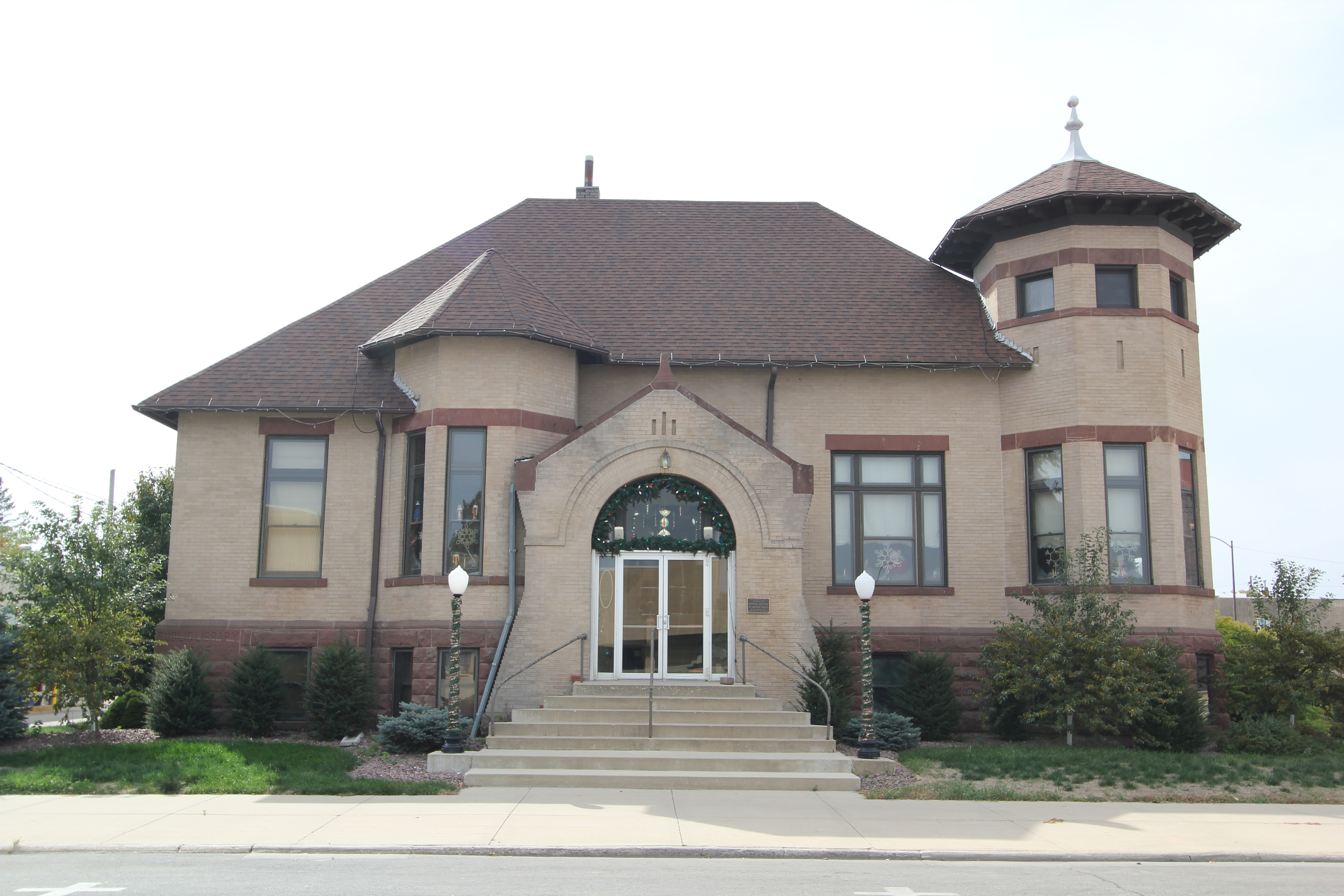

- Location within Iowa Location within the United States
- Location: E. 5th and Erie Sts. Storm Lake, Iowa
- Coordinates: 42°38′39″N 95°11′57″W
- Area: less than one acre
- Built: 1906
- Architect: Paul O. Moratz
- MPS: Public Library Buildings in Iowa TR
- NRHP reference No.: 83000346
- Added to NRHP: May 23, 1983

The former Storm Lake Public Library is located in Storm Lake, Iowa, United States. The Carnegie Corporation of New York accepted Storm Lake's application for a grant for $10,000 on December 4, 1903. Designed by Paul O. Moratz, the new library was dedicated on September 29, 1906. After its use as a library, the building housed the museum for the Buena Vista County Historical Society. It was listed on the National Register of Historic Places in 1983.
