= Storm Lake, Iowa =

- City
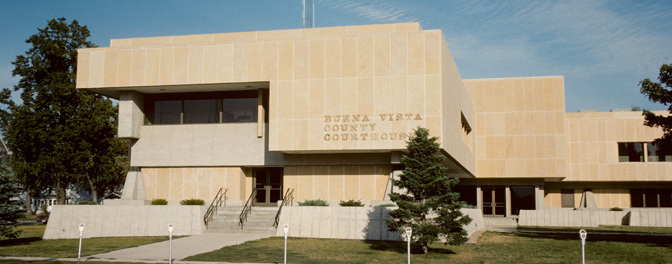
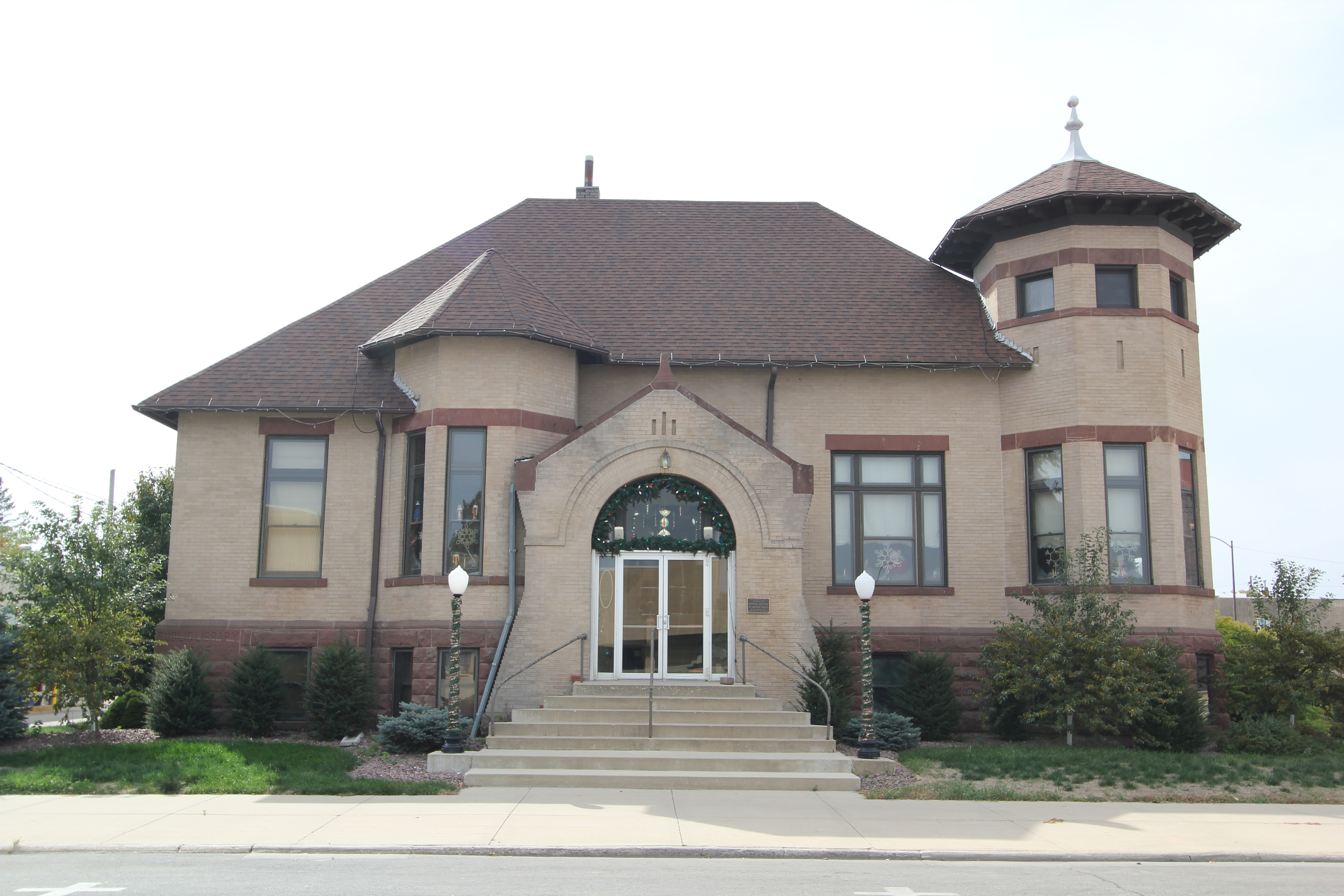
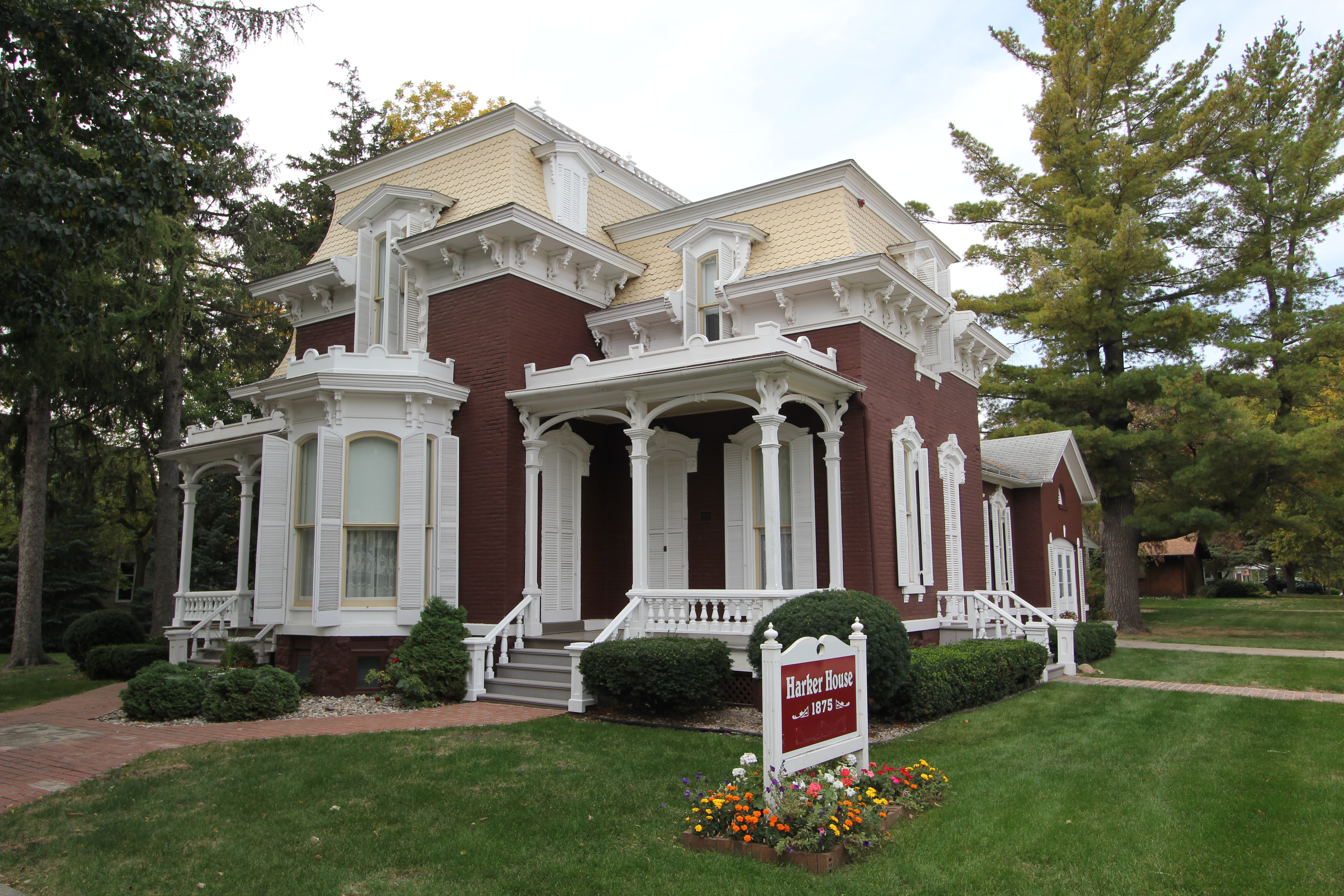
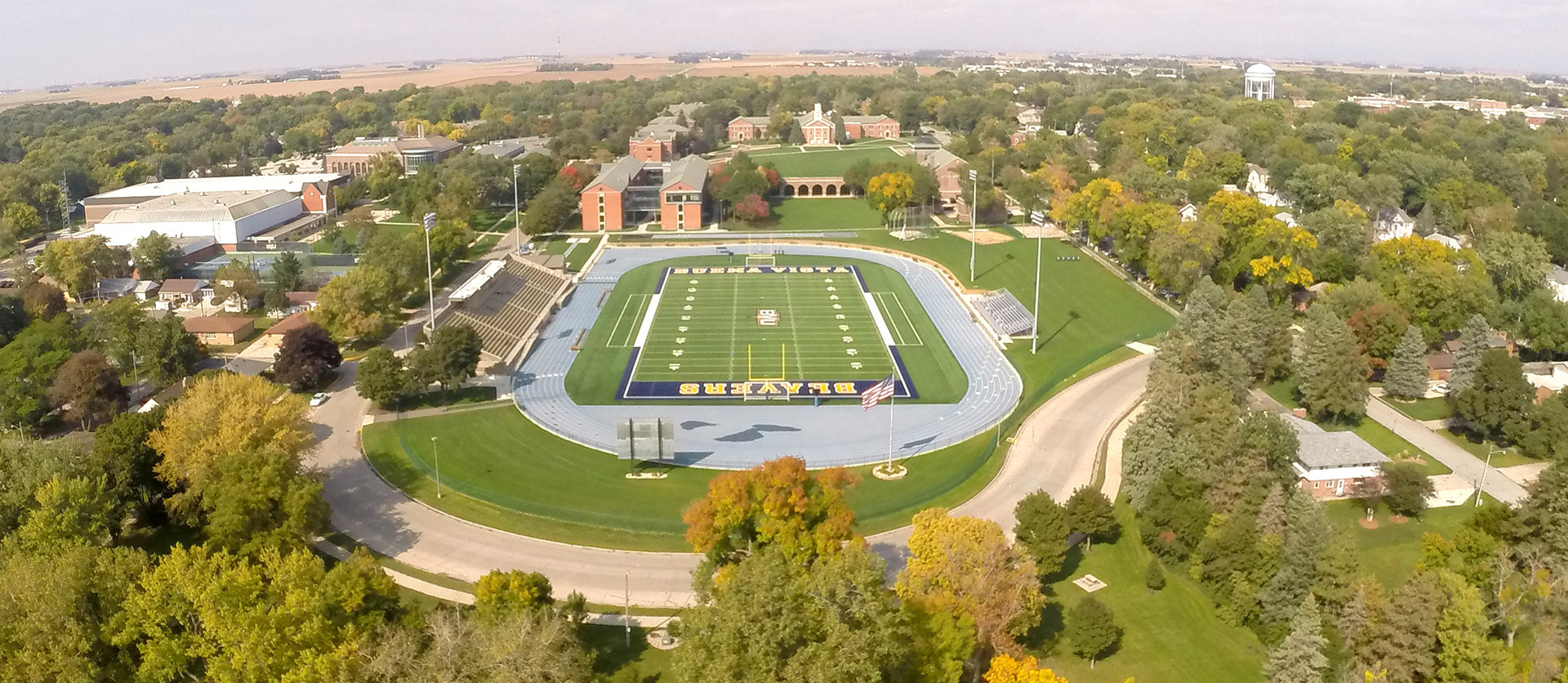
- Buena Vista County Courthouse Storm Lake Public Library Harker House Buena Vista University
- Interactive map of Storm Lake, Iowa
- Location within Iowa Location within the United States
- Coordinates: 42°37′52″N 95°12′57″W
- Country: United States
- State: Iowa
- County: Buena Vista
- Incorporated: February 28, 1873

Area
  - Total: 5.37 sq mi (13.92 km^{2})
  - Land: 5.37 sq mi (13.92 km^{2})
  - Water: 0 sq mi (0.00 km^{2})
- Elevation: 1,437 ft (438 m)

Population (2020)
  - Total: 11,269
  - Density: 2,096/sq mi (809.3/km^{2})
- Time zone: UTC-6 (Central (CST))
  - Summer (DST): UTC-5 (CDT)
- ZIP code: 50588
- Area code: 712
- FIPS code: 19-75630
- GNIS feature ID: 468754
- Website: www.stormlake.org

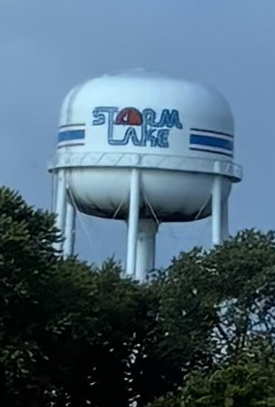
Water tower

Storm Lake is a city in and the county seat of Buena Vista County, Iowa, United States. The population was 11,269 in the 2020 census, an increase from 10,076 in the 2000 census. It has one of the only cities in Iowa with a non-white majority population.

Located along the northern shore of Storm Lake, the city is home to King's Pointe Waterpark Resort, the Living Heritage Tree Museum, the Santa's Castle holiday attraction, and Buena Vista University, a private university. Housing a large Tyson Foods meatpacking plant, the town is responsible for some 3.5% of pork production in the United States.

== History ==
Storm Lake's first European settler, Abner Bell, arrived in 1856, and the city was officially incorporated in 1873. Though early settlers found no natives permanently occupying the land, the area around the lake was likely used for fishing and hunting by tribes traveling from the north. Centuries prior to European colonization, the area was home to the Mill Creek indigenous culture. Railroad magnate John Insley Blair platted out land in Storm Lake in the 1870s. During the same decade, the Illinois Central Railroad was constructed through the town.

The city of Storm Lake is named for the lake where it is said a trapper experienced a severe storm. An alternate story claims the lake took its name after two star-crossed lovers from opposed Native American bands paddled out for a secret rendezvous, only to be drowned as a sudden storm blew in.

The 1920s and 1930s saw economic and industrial growth, with the town remaining relatively unaffected by the Great Depression. During the 1940s, a prisoner-of-war camp was temporarily established in Storm Lake. In 1956, the main building of the Buena Vista University campus burned down. The central brick archway was salvaged and remains standing.

Storm Lake was a landing place of Hmong and Tai Dam refugees following the Vietnam War. Meat packing jobs have drawn thousands of migrant workers, predominantly from Latin America. Work vouchers and other factors have also drawn immigration from Micronesia. Storm Lake is currently one of ten cities in the mainland United States to host a polling location for Micronesian elections. A 2017 New York Times profile analyzed the positive effects of immigration on the Storm Lake community. Also that year, journalist Katie Couric interviewed Storm Lake residents for a National Geographic story on the town's diversity. A 2020 article in Fox News highlighted Storm Lake as an example of the positive economic impacts of immigration on rural communities.

== Geography ==
Storm Lake is located in the northwestern part of the state, along the north shore of its namesake Storm Lake, a glacial lake. It directly borders Lakeside, a smaller community located on the east shore of the lake. It is the principal city of the Storm Lake micropolitan area.

According to the United States Census Bureau, the city has a total area of 4.09 square miles (10.59 km^{2}), all land.

Due to its location, Storm Lake is a popular campaign trail stop during presidential elections, having drawn visits from George H. W. Bush, Barack Obama, Bill Clinton, Mitt Romney, Kamala Harris, and Bernie Sanders.

=== Climate ===
Climate data for Storm Lake, Iowa, 1991–2020 normals, extremes 1893–present
Month	Jan	Feb	Mar	Apr	May	Jun	Jul	Aug	Sep	Oct	Nov	Dec	Year
Record high °F (°C)	66 (19)	66 (19)	85 (29)	93 (34)	107 (42)	105 (41)	109 (43)	109 (43)	101 (38)	91 (33)	78 (26)	66 (19)	109 (43)
Mean maximum °F (°C)	46.3 (7.9)	51.2 (10.7)	69.3 (20.7)	80.9 (27.2)	88.2 (31.2)	91.8 (33.2)	92.6 (33.7)	90.9 (32.7)	88.5 (31.4)	82.7 (28.2)	65.9 (18.8)	50.4 (10.2)	94.5 (34.7)
Mean daily maximum °F (°C)	25.8 (−3.4)	30.2 (−1.0)	43.4 (6.3)	58.1 (14.5)	69.1 (20.6)	79.2 (26.2)	82.3 (27.9)	79.9 (26.6)	74.1 (23.4)	60.6 (15.9)	44.3 (6.8)	31.1 (−0.5)	56.5 (13.6)
Daily mean °F (°C)	17.3 (−8.2)	21.7 (−5.7)	34.2 (1.2)	47.5 (8.6)	59.3 (15.2)	69.7 (20.9)	73.0 (22.8)	70.6 (21.4)	63.3 (17.4)	50.1 (10.1)	35.5 (1.9)	23.2 (−4.9)	47.1 (8.4)
Mean daily minimum °F (°C)	8.8 (−12.9)	13.3 (−10.4)	25.1 (−3.8)	36.9 (2.7)	49.4 (9.7)	60.2 (15.7)	63.7 (17.6)	61.4 (16.3)	52.6 (11.4)	39.6 (4.2)	26.6 (−3.0)	15.3 (−9.3)	37.7 (3.2)
Mean minimum °F (°C)	−12.4 (−24.7)	−7.9 (−22.2)	2.8 (−16.2)	20.6 (−6.3)	34.1 (1.2)	47.4 (8.6)	52.0 (11.1)	50.3 (10.2)	36.9 (2.7)	23.5 (−4.7)	8.5 (−13.1)	−6.0 (−21.1)	−14.9 (−26.1)
Record low °F (°C)	−31 (−35)	−34 (−37)	−24 (−31)	2 (−17)	20 (−7)	34 (1)	42 (6)	36 (2)	22 (−6)	2 (−17)	−11 (−24)	−29 (−34)	−34 (−37)
Average precipitation inches (mm)	0.77 (20)	1.01 (26)	1.74 (44)	3.53 (90)	4.87 (124)	5.33 (135)	3.83 (97)	4.43 (113)	2.96 (75)	2.42 (61)	1.75 (44)	1.11 (28)	33.75 (857)
Average snowfall inches (cm)	6.7 (17)	6.7 (17)	6.4 (16)	2.7 (6.9)	0.0 (0.0)	0.0 (0.0)	0.0 (0.0)	0.0 (0.0)	trace	0.4 (1.0)	4.7 (12)	8.8 (22)	36.4 (91.9)
Average precipitation days (≥ 0.01 in)	3.0	3.4	5.9	9.2	10.7	10.8	8.7	8.6	8.2	7.4	5.6	4.0	85.5
Average snowy days (≥ 0.1 in)	4.0	3.4	2.9	1.2	0.0	0.0	0.0	0.0	0.0	0.2	2.0	4.0	17.7
Source: NOAA (precip days, snow/snow days 1981–2010)

== Demographics ==
Historical population
Year	Pop.	±%
1880	1,034	—
1890	1,682	+62.7%
1900	2,169	+29.0%
1910	2,428	+11.9%
1920	3,658	+50.7%
1930	4,157	+13.6%
1940	5,274	+26.9%
1950	6,954	+31.9%
1960	7,728	+11.1%
1970	8,591	+11.2%
1980	8,814	+2.6%
1990	8,769	−0.5%
2000	10,076	+14.9%
2010	10,600	+5.2%
2020	11,269	+6.3%
Iowa Data Center; Source: U.S. Decennial Census

=== Racial and ethnic composition ===
Storm Lake city, Iowa – Racial composition Note: the US Census treats Hispanic/Latino as an ethnic category. This table excludes Latinos from the racial categories and assigns them to a separate category. Hispanics/Latinos may be of any race.
Race (NH = Non-Hispanic)	2020	2010	2000	1990	1980
White alone (NH)	32.7% (3,680)	48.2% (5,111)	69.8% (7,033)	94.9% (8,320)	98.7% (8,700)
Black alone (NH)	4.4% (494)	4.1% (439)	0.4% (42)	0.4% (39)	0.1% (6)
American Indian alone (NH)	0.1% (15)	0.1% (12)	0.1% (7)	0.1% (9)	0.8% (69)
Asian alone (NH)	15.8% (1,779)	9.7% (1,027)	7.7% (776)	3.4% (298)	
Pacific Islander alone (NH)	4.2% (477)	0.8% (90)	0% (0)		
Other race alone (NH)	0.6% (62)	0% (4)	0.1% (9)	0% (1)	
Multiracial (NH)	1.4% (163)	0.9% (95)	0.9% (88)	—	—
Hispanic/Latino (any race)	40.8% (4,599)	36.1% (3,822)	21.1% (2,121)	1.2% (102)	0.4% (39)

=== 2020 census ===
As of the 2020 census, Storm Lake had a population of 11,269. The median age was 31.5 years. 27.6% of residents were under the age of 18 and 12.3% of residents were 65 years of age or older. For every 100 females there were 101.3 males, and for every 100 females age 18 and over there were 100.2 males age 18 and over.

99.0% of residents lived in urban areas, while 1.0% lived in rural areas.

There were 3,597 households in Storm Lake, of which 39.8% had children under the age of 18 living in them. Of all households, 48.5% were married-couple households, 18.9% were households with a male householder and no spouse or partner present, and 24.8% were households with a female householder and no spouse or partner present. About 27.1% of all households were made up of individuals and 11.7% had someone living alone who was 65 years of age or older.

There were 3,844 housing units, of which 6.4% were vacant. The homeowner vacancy rate was 1.1% and the rental vacancy rate was 6.2%.

The most reported ancestries were:

- Mexican (28.7%)
- German (11.8%)
- Laotian (6%)
- English (5.6%)
- Burmese (5%)
- Irish (4.7%)
- Cuban (3.6%)
- Salvadoran (3.2%)
- Hmong (2.5%)
- Swedish (1.6%)

== Economy ==
Tyson Foods operates a hog slaughterhouse, meat packing plant, and turkey processing plant in the city. As of 2020, the plant employed over 2,500 workers and accounted for about 3.5% of US pork production. The plant originally opened in 1935 and was purchased by Hygrade Food Products in 1952. In 1982, it was sold to Iowa Beef Processors, which was subsequently acquired by Tyson in 2001.

== Arts and culture ==
- The Living Heritage Tree Museum is located in Storm Lake.
- Santa's Castle, a seasonal display of antique holiday animation, is housed in a former Victorian library.
- The Buena Vista County Historical Society operates a museum.
- A concert bandshell is located in Sunset Park.
- The Witter Gallery features monthly exhibits from both local and non-local artists, and offers free art classes and events.
- The annual Star Spangled Spectacular takes place on Independence Day, and features food vendors, live music shows, games, rides, a fireworks show, and The Parade of Nations, which acknowledges various cultures of the community.
- Historical sites in Storm Lake include the Harker House, the Old Storm Lake High School, and the Cobblestone Inn and Ballroom, which hosted performances by jazz musicians Louis Armstrong and Duke Ellington.

== Parks and recreation ==
- King's Pointe is a 100-room community-owned tourism resort located on the lakefront, with an indoor and outdoor water park, multiple banquet facilities, a minigolf course, and a restaurant.
- The city operates Sunrise Pointe, a nine-hole golf course.
- The city has over a dozen parks and five beach areas.
- A nature reserve of prairie and marshland ecosystems is located by the lake, and features a boardwalk, education center, and observation tower.

== Education ==
The Storm Lake Community School District operates five local public schools, including a high school, a middle school, an elementary school, an early elementary school, and an early childhood center. As of the 2023 school year, the Storm Lake Community School District served 2,908 students. Spanish was the most spoken language within the school district, followed by English, Pohnpeian, Karen, and Lao.

St. Mary's Catholic Church operates a private K-12 school system, St. Mary's High School, founded in 1912.

Buena Vista University is located in Storm Lake. As of 2023, the university has 1,959 students on a 60-acre (24 ha) campus within Storm Lake. The city hosts a satellite campus for Iowa Central Community College, including an industrial training center established in 2021.

== Media ==
The community has a twice-weekly newspaper, the Storm Lake Times Pilot. The publication received the 2017 Pulitzer Prize in Editorial Writing for a series on the Iowa agricultural industry. Storm Lake's first newspaper, the Storm Lake Pilot-Tribune, was founded in 1896 and ran for over 125 years before being bought by the Storm Lake Times in 2022. KAYL and KKIA radio serve the community, as well as a university radio station, KBVU. A Spanish-language newspaper, La Prensa, also covers the area.

== Infrastructure ==
The Storm Lake Police Department provides law enforcement services to the city. The department employs 21 sworn officers, and two community services officers.

Storm Lake is served by Buena Vista Regional Medical Center, a 54-bed critical access hospital, and United Community Health Center.

The Storm Lake Municipal Airport operates out of the city.

== In literature and media ==
In 2018, lifelong resident and Pulitzer Prize-winning newspaperman, Art Cullen published the book, Storm Lake: A Chronicle of Change, Resilience, and Hope from a Heartland Newspaper. In a related work that highlights the community, the Cullen family and their newspaper business, The Storm Lake Times, Beth Levison and Jerry Risius produced and directed the 2021 documentary film Storm Lake.

== Notable people ==
- Mary Foley Benson (1905–1992), artist, illustrator, and WWII pilot
- Nate Bjorkgren, basketball coach
- Janet Dailey, romance novelist
- Joe Decker (1947–2003), MLB player
- George B. French, actor
- Edmund B. Gregory, Lieutenant General in the U.S. Army
- Julie Gutz (born 1926), All-American Girls Professional Baseball League player
- Gene Hackman, Oscar-winning actor, attended Storm Lake High School
- Winton Hoch, Oscar-winning cinematographer
- Marjorie Holmes (1910–2002), author of several novels, most notably Two From Galilee
- Steve King, former US Congressman, born in Storm Lake before moving to Denison.
- Frederic O. MacCartney (1864–1903), Massachusetts socialist politician, graduate of Storm Lake High School
- Ben McCollum, head coach University of Iowa men's basketball
- Reno H. Sales (1876–1969), Chief Geologist of Anaconda Corporation, "father of mining geology"
