= Danish Lutheran Church (Alta, Iowa) =

- U.S. National Register of Historic Places
- Location within Iowa Location within the United States
- Location: 113 W. 4th St. Alta, Iowa
- Coordinates: 42°40′18″N 95°18′16″W
- Built: 1887
- Architectural style: Gothic Revival
- NRHP reference No.: 11000814
- Added to NRHP: November 18, 2011

Danish Lutheran Church is located in Alta, Iowa, United States. The first meeting of the Danish Lutheran church society was held on February 22, 1880, with 42 people as charter members. They built this Gothic Revival church building in 1887. It measures 24 by 36 feet (7.3 by 11.0 m), and cost a $1,000 to build. The Rev. Amos Johnson served as the congregation's first pastor. The church building was listed on the National Register of Historic Places in 2011.

The building was set to be torn down at least by October of 2020 due to an issue with vermin and structural concerns. The city sued the owner for property neglect and ownership was transferred in 2022 for $4,000. Demolition was postponed and, after determining that the building could not be moved or fixed, the new owners salvaged the windows and some of the wood. The building was torn down on May 29, 2024. It has since been removed from the National Register of Historic Places.
