= KAYL-FM =

- Storm Lake, Iowa; United States
- Broadcast area: Buena Vista County, Iowa
- Frequency: 101.7 MHz
- Branding: Mix 101.7

Programming
- Format: Hot adult contemporary
- Affiliations: Premiere Networks

Ownership
- Owner: Community First Broadcasting

History
- First air date: 1949

Technical information
- Licensing authority: FCC
- Facility ID: 49743
- Class: C2
- ERP: 50,000 watts
- HAAT: 122 metres (400 ft)
- Transmitter coordinates: 42°38′5″N 95°10′10″W

Links
- Public license information: Public file; LMS
- Webcast: Listen live
- Website: www.stormlakeradio.com

KAYL-FM (101.7 FM) is a radio station licensed to serve the community of Storm Lake, Iowa, owned by Community First Broadcasting.

KAYL-FM began broadcasting on 101.5 MHz in 1949.

KAYL-FM upgraded the FM transmitter and began broadcasting in stereo in June 1979. The frequency change to 101.7 MHz occurred in September 1995.
